= Billboard Year-End Hot R&B Singles of 1993 =

American music chart

This is a list of Billboard magazine's Top Hot R&B Singles of 1993.

No.	Title	Artist(s)
1	"I Will Always Love You"	Whitney Houston
2	"Knockin' Da Boots"	H-Town
3	"That's the Way Love Goes"	Janet Jackson
4	"Freak Me"	Silk
5	"If I Ever Fall in Love"	Shai
6	"Weak"	SWV
7	"I'm So into You"	SWV
8	"Don't Walk Away"	Jade
9	"Whoomp! (There It Is)"	Tag Team
10	"Rump Shaker"	Wreckx-n-Effect
11	"Nuthin' but a 'G' Thang"	Dr. Dre featuring Snoop Doggy Dogg
12	"Lately"	Jodeci
13	"Something's Goin' On"	U.N.V.
14	"So Alone"	Men at Large
15	"Another Sad Love Song"	Toni Braxton
16	"Just Kickin' It"	Xscape
17	"Right Here (Human Nature)" / "Downtown"	SWV
18	"Cry No More"	II D Extreme
19	"Hey Mr. DJ"	Zhané
20	"Dreamlover"	Mariah Carey
21	"Comforter"	Shai
22	"Here We Go Again!"	Portrait
23	"Hip Hop Hooray"	Naughty by Nature
24	"Love No Limit"	Mary J. Blige
25	"Mr. Wendal"	Arrested Development
26	"Dazzey Duks"	Duice
27	"I Get Around"	2Pac
28	"If"	Janet Jackson
29	"Whoot, There It Is"	95 South
30	"Show Me Love"	Robin S.
31	"Love Shoulda Brought You Home"	Toni Braxton
32	"I Have Nothing"	Whitney Houston
33	"Get Away"	Bobby Brown
34	"Reminisce"	Mary J. Blige
35	"I'm Every Woman"	Whitney Houston
36	"One Last Cry"	Brian McKnight
37	"ABC-123"	LeVert
38	"Baby, I'm for Real/Natural High"	After 7
39	"Quality Time"	Hi-Five
40	"Good Enough"	Bobby Brown
41	"Dedicated"	R. Kelly and Public Announcement
42	"I Got a Thang 4 Ya!"	Lo-Key?
43	"If I Had No Loot"	Tony! Toni! Toné!
44	"Anniversary"	Tony! Toni! Toné!
45	"One Woman"	Jade
46	"In the Still of the Nite (I'll Remember)"	Boyz II Men
47	"Love's Taken Over"	Chanté Moore
48	"I Got a Man"	Positive K
49	"It Was a Good Day"	Ice Cube
50	"Gangsta Lean"	DRS
51	"Ruffneck"	MC Lyte
52	"Games"	Chuckii Booker
53	"Something in Your Eyes"	Bell Biv DeVoe
54	"Lose Control" / "Girl U For Me"	Silk
55	"Alright"	Kris Kross featuring Super Cat
56	"Rebirth of Slick (Cool Like Dat)"	Digable Planets
57	"Check Yo Self"	Ice Cube featuring Das EFX
58	"Dre Day"	Dr. Dre featuring Snoop Doggy Dogg
59	"Slam"	Onyx
60	"Slow and Sexy"	Shabba Ranks featuring Johnny Gill
61	"Ditty"	Paperboy
62	"Sweet Thing"	Mary J. Blige
63	"If I Could"	Regina Belle
64	"Every Little Thing U Do"	Christopher Williams
65	"I'm in Luv"	Joe
66	"Kiss of Life"	Sade
67	"Informer"	Snow
68	"Come Inside"	Intro
69	"Give It Up, Turn It Loose"	En Vogue
70	"Happy Days"	Silk
71	"No Ordinary Love"	Sade
72	"What About Your Friends"	TLC
73	"For the Cool in You"	Babyface
74	"Baby I'm Yours"	Shai
75	"Can We Talk"	Tevin Campbell
76	"Get It Up"	TLC
77	"Seems You're Much Too Busy"	Vertical Hold
78	"It's for You"	Shanice
79	"Good Ol' Days"	LeVert
80	"Flex"	Mad Cobra
81	"It's Alright"	Chanté Moore
82	"Sweet On U"	Lo-Key?
83	"Breathe Again"	Toni Braxton
84	"Down with the King"	Run-DMC featuring Pete Rock & CL Smooth
85	"The Floor"	Johnny Gill
86	"Love Makes No Sense"	Alexander O'Neal
87	"Let Me Be the One"	Intro
88	"Who Is It?"	Michael Jackson
89	"Little Miracles (Happen Every Day)"	Luther Vandross
90	"That's the Way Love Is"	Bobby Brown
91	"Laid Back Girl"	Maze
92	"All I See"	Christopher Williams
93	"Shoop"	Salt-N-Pepa
94	"Everything's Gonna Be Alright"	Father MC
95	"Honey Dip"	Portrait
96	"Shoop Shoop (Never Stop Givin' You Love)"	Michael Cooper
97	"Hey Love (Can I Have a Word)"	R. Kelly and Public Announcement featuring Mr. Lee
98	"A Whole New World"	Peabo Bryson and Regina Belle
99	"Can He Love U Like This"	After 7
100	"Hat 2 da Back"	TLC

== See also ==
- 1993 in music
- Billboard Year-End Hot 100 singles of 1993
- Billboard Year-End Hot Rap Singles of 1993
- List of Hot R&B Singles number ones of 1993
