= Billboard Year-End Hot 100 singles of 1993 =

Ranking of recorded music

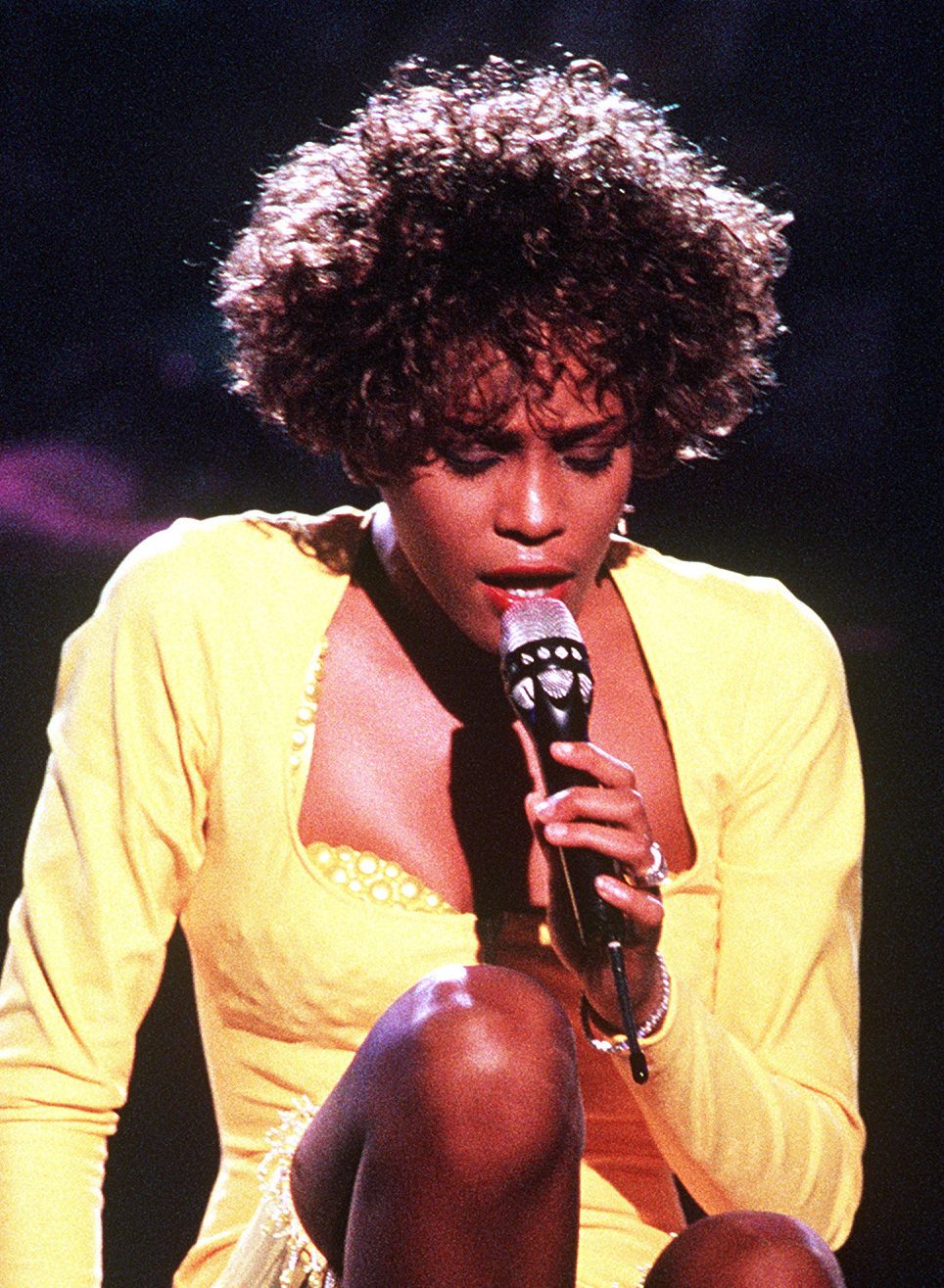
Whitney Houston had three songs on the Year-End Hot 100, including "I Will Always Love You", the number-one hit song of the year.

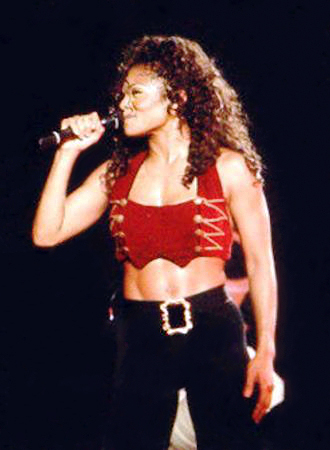
Janet Jackson charted three songs from her 1993 album Janet—"That's the Way Love Goes" at number four, "If" at number 19, and "Again" at number 74.

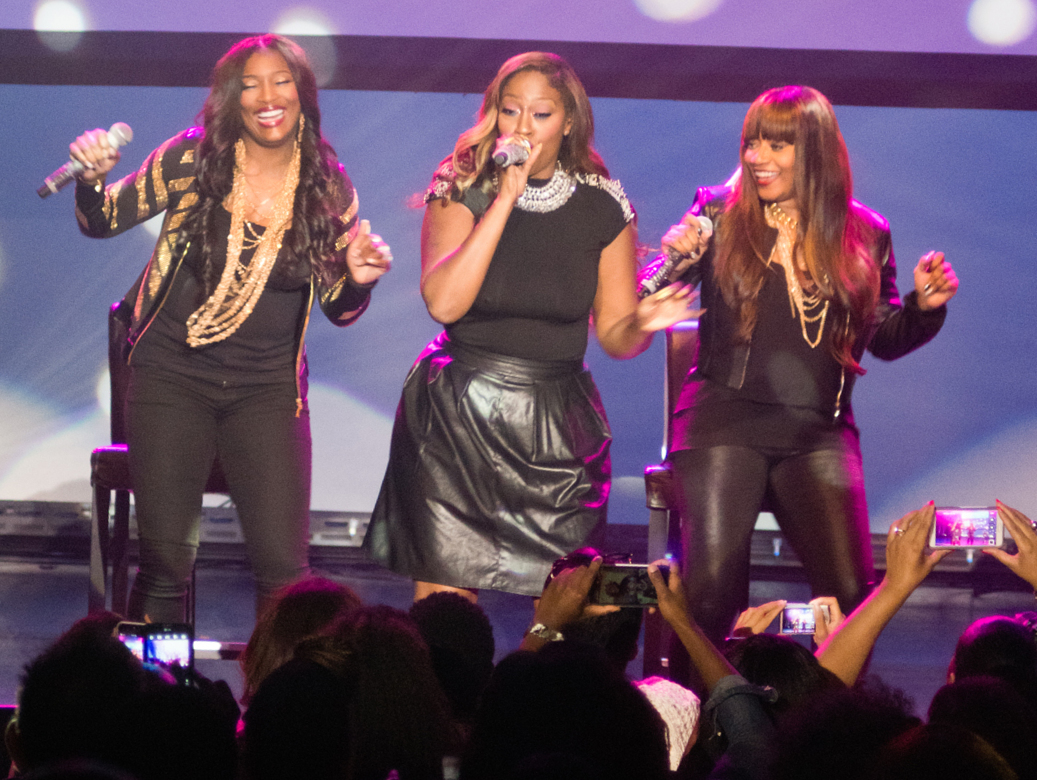
SWV (pictured in 2014) had three songs in the top-40 of the year-end chart: "Weak" (number 6), "I'm So Into You" (number 20), and "Right Here (Human Nature)" (number 29).

This is a list of Billboard magazine's Top Hot 100 songs of 1993.

| № | Title | Artist(s) |
|---|---|---|
| 1 | "I Will Always Love You" | Whitney Houston |
| 2 | "Whoomp! (There It Is)" | Tag Team |
| 3 | "Can't Help Falling in Love" | UB40 |
| 4 | "That's the Way Love Goes" | Janet Jackson |
| 5 | "Freak Me" | Silk |
| 6 | "Weak" | SWV |
| 7 | "If I Ever Fall in Love" | Shai |
| 8 | "Dreamlover" | Mariah Carey |
| 9 | "Rump Shaker" | Wreckx-n-Effect |
| 10 | "Informer" | Snow |
| 11 | "Nuthin' but a 'G' Thang" | Dr. Dre |
| 12 | "In the Still of the Nite" | Boyz II Men |
| 13 | "Don't Walk Away" | Jade |
| 14 | "Knockin' da Boots" | H-Town |
| 15 | "Lately" | Jodeci |
| 16 | "Dazzey Duks" | Duice |
| 17 | "Show Me Love" | Robin S. |
| 18 | "A Whole New World" | Peabo Bryson and Regina Belle |
| 19 | "If" | Janet Jackson |
| 20 | "I'm So Into You" | SWV |
| 21 | "Love Is" | Vanessa Williams and Brian McKnight |
| 22 | "Runaway Train" | Soul Asylum |
| 23 | "I'll Never Get Over You (Getting Over Me)" | Exposé |
| 24 | "Ditty" | Paperboy |
| 25 | "Rhythm Is a Dancer" | Snap! |
| 26 | "The River of Dreams" | Billy Joel |
| 27 | "I'm Gonna Be (500 Miles)" | The Proclaimers |
| 28 | "Two Princes" | Spin Doctors |
| 29 | "Right Here (Human Nature)" | SWV |
| 30 | "I Have Nothing" | Whitney Houston |
| 31 | "Mr. Wendal" | Arrested Development |
| 32 | "Have I Told You Lately" | Rod Stewart |
| 33 | "Saving Forever for You" | Shanice |
| 34 | "Ordinary World" | Duran Duran |
| 35 | "If I Had No Loot" | Tony! Toni! Toné! |
| 36 | "I'd Do Anything for Love (But I Won't Do That)" | Meat Loaf |
| 37 | "Slam" | Onyx |
| 38 | "Looking Through Patient Eyes" | P.M. Dawn |
| 39 | "I'm Every Woman" | Whitney Houston |
| 40 | "Baby I'm Yours" | Shai |
| 41 | "Come Undone" | Duran Duran |
| 42 | "I Don't Wanna Fight" | Tina Turner |
| 43 | "I'd Die Without You" | P.M. Dawn |
| 44 | "Whoot, There It Is" | 95 South |
| 45 | "Hip Hop Hooray" | Naughty by Nature |
| 46 | "Another Sad Love Song" | Toni Braxton |
| 47 | "Will You Be There" | Michael Jackson |
| 48 | "Comforter" | Shai |
| 49 | "Good Enough" | Bobby Brown |
| 50 | "What's Up?" | 4 Non Blondes |
| 51 | "All That She Wants" | Ace of Base |
| 52 | "7" | Prince and The New Power Generation |
| 53 | "Dre Day" | Dr. Dre |
| 54 | "One Last Cry" | Brian McKnight |
| 55 | "Just Kickin' It" | Xscape |
| 56 | "I Get Around" | 2Pac |
| 57 | "Bed of Roses" | Bon Jovi |
| 58 | "Real Love" | Mary J. Blige |
| 59 | "Here We Go Again!" | Portrait |
| 60 | "Cryin'" | Aerosmith |
| 61 | "Cat's in the Cradle" | Ugly Kid Joe |
| 62 | "What About Your Friends" | TLC |
| 63 | "I Got a Man" | Positive K |
| 64 | "Hey Mr. D.J." | Zhané |
| 65 | "Insane in the Brain" | Cypress Hill |
| 66 | "Deeper and Deeper" | Madonna |
| 67 | "Rain" | Madonna |
| 68 | "The Right Kind of Love" | Jeremy Jordan |
| 69 | "Bad Boys" | Inner Circle |
| 70 | "That's What Love Can Do" | Boy Krazy |
| 71 | "Do You Believe in Us" | Jon Secada |
| 72 | "Angel" | Jon Secada |
| 73 | "Forever in Love" | Kenny G |
| 74 | "Again" | Janet Jackson |
| 75 | "Boom! Shake the Room" | DJ Jazzy Jeff & The Fresh Prince |
| 76 | "When She Cries" | Restless Heart |
| 77 | "Sweat (A La La La La Long)" | Inner Circle |
| 78 | "It Was a Good Day" | Ice Cube |
| 79 | "More and More" | Captain Hollywood Project |
| 80 | "How Do You Talk to an Angel" | The Heights |
| 81 | "Rebirth of Slick (Cool Like Dat)" | Digable Planets |
| 82 | "What Is Love" | Haddaway |
| 83 | "To Love Somebody" | Michael Bolton |
| 84 | "Give It Up, Turn It Loose" | En Vogue |
| 85 | "Alright" | Kris Kross featuring Super Cat |
| 86 | "Check Yo Self" | Ice Cube featuring Das EFX |
| 87 | "Fields of Gold" | Sting |
| 88 | "Ooh Child" | Dino |
| 89 | "Faithful" | Go West |
| 90 | "Reason to Believe" | Rod Stewart |
| 91 | "Break It Down Again" | Tears for Fears |
| 92 | "Nothin' My Love Can't Fix" | Joey Lawrence |
| 93 | "Three Little Pigs" | Green Jellÿ |
| 94 | "Livin' on the Edge" | Aerosmith |
| 95 | "Hey Jealousy" | Gin Blossoms |
| 96 | "If I Ever Lose My Faith in You" | Sting |
| 97 | "Anniversary" | Tony! Toni! Toné! |
| 98 | "One Woman" | Jade |
| 99 | "Can't Get Enough of Your Love" | Taylor Dayne |
| 100 | "Two Steps Behind" | Def Leppard |

== See also ==
- 1993 in music
- Billboard Year-End Hot R&B Singles of 1993
- Billboard Year-End Hot Rap Singles of 1993
- List of Billboard Hot 100 number-one singles of 1993
- List of Billboard Hot 100 top-ten singles in 1993
