= Billboard Year-End Hot Rap Singles of 1993 =

American music chart

This is a list of Billboard magazine's Top Rap songs of 1993.

№	Title	Artist(s)
1	"We Getz Busy" / "Head or Gut"	Illegal
2	"Rebirth of Slick (Cool Like Dat)"	Digable Planets
3	"I Got a Man"	Positive K
4	"Chief Rocka"	Lords of the Underground
5	"Informer"	Snow
6	"Nuthin' but a 'G' Thang"	Dr. Dre featuring Snoop Doggy Dogg
7	"Ruffneck"	MC Lyte
8	"Throw Ya Gunz"	Onyx
9	"Punks Jump Up to Get Beat Down"	Brand Nubian
10	"Lots of Lovin'"	Pete Rock & CL Smooth
11	"Passin' Me By"	The Pharcyde
12	"Alright"	Kris Kross featuring Super Cat
13	"Slam"	Onyx
14	"Insane in the Brain"	Cypress Hill
15	"Wicked"	Ice Cube
16	"Whoot, There It Is"	95 South
17	"Down with the King"	Run-DMC featuring Pete Rock & CL Smooth
18	"Funky Child"	Lords of the Underground
19	"Flow Joe"	Fat Joe
20	"Let Me Roll"	Scarface
21	"Back Seat (of My Jeep)" / "Pink Cookies..."	LL Cool J
22	"Everything's Gonna Be Alright"	Father MC
23	"Flex"	Mad Cobra
24	"Peace Treaty"	Kam
25	"It Was a Good Day"	Ice Cube
26	"Six Feet Deep"	Geto Boys
27	"The Bonnie And Clyde Theme" / "IBWin' With My CREWin"	Yo-Yo featuring Ice Cube
28	"Recipe of a Hoe"	Boss
29	"Grand Groove"	Intelligent Hoodlum
30	"Deeper"	Boss

== See also ==
- 1993 in music
- Billboard Year-End Hot 100 singles of 1993
- Billboard Year-End Hot R&B Singles of 1993
- List of Billboard number-one rap singles of 1993
