= List of Billboard Hot 100 top-ten singles in 1993 =

This is a list of singles that charted in the top ten of the Billboard Hot 100 during 1993.

Janet Jackson, SWV, Whitney Houston, Snoop Doggy Dogg, and Shai each had three top-ten hits in 1993, tying them for the most top-ten hits during the year.

== Top-ten singles ==
- (#) – 1993 Year-end top 10 single position and rank

List of Billboard Hot 100 Top 10 singles which peaked in 1993
| Top ten entry date | Single | Artist(s) | Peak | Peak date | Weeks in top ten |
Singles from 1992
| October 31 | "Rhythm Is a Dancer" | Snap! | 5 | January 2 | 14 |
| December 12 | "In the Still of the Nite (I'll Remember)" | Boyz II Men | 3 | January 16 | 11 |
| December 26 | "Saving Forever for You" | Shanice | 4 | January 30 | 10 |
Singles from 1993
| January 16 | "Deeper and Deeper" | Madonna | 7 | January 30 | 4 |
| January 23 | "A Whole New World (Aladdin's Theme)" | Peabo Bryson & Regina Belle | 1 | March 6 | 10 |
| January 30 | "7" | Prince and the New Power Generation | 7 | February 27 | 5 |
| February 6 | "Ordinary World" | Duran Duran | 3 | February 20 | 9 |
| February 6 | "Mr. Wendal" | Arrested Development | 6 | February 20 | 10 |
| February 13 | "I'm Every Woman" | Whitney Houston | 4 | February 20 | 8 |
| February 20 | "Hip Hop Hooray" | Naughty by Nature | 8 | March 6 | 3 |
| February 27 | "Nuthin' but a 'G' Thang" | Dr. Dre featuring Snoop Doggy Dogg | 2 | March 20 | 14 |
| February 27 | "Informer" (#10) | Snow | 1 | March 13 | 13 |
| March 6 | "Don't Walk Away" | Jade | 4 | March 27 | 12 |
| March 6 | "Bed of Roses" | Bon Jovi | 10 | March 6 | 6 |
| March 13 | "Freak Me" (#5) | Silk | 1 | May 1 | 16 |
| March 20 | "I Have Nothing" | Whitney Houston | 4 | April 3 | 11 |
| April 3 | "Cat's in the Cradle" | Ugly Kid Joe | 6 | April 10 | 4 |
| April 10 | "Two Princes" | Spin Doctors | 7 | April 10 | 4 |
| April 10 | "Love Is" | Vanessa Williams & Brian McKnight | 3 | May 15 | 9 |
| April 17 | "I'm So into You" | SWV | 6 | May 22 | 10 |
| April 17 | "Comforter" | Shai | 10 | April 17 | 1 |
| April 24 | "Ditty" | Paperboy | 10 | April 24 | 3 |
| May 1 | "Looking Through Patient Eyes" | P.M. Dawn | 6 | May 29 | 8 |
| May 8 | "That's the Way Love Goes" (#4) | Janet Jackson | 1 | May 15 | 14 |
| May 15 | "Knockin' Da Boots" | H-Town | 3 | May 22 | 12 |
| May 22 | "Weak" (#6) | SWV | 1 | July 10 | 15 |
| June 5 | "Show Me Love" | Robin S. | 5 | June 12 | 10 |
| June 5 | "Have I Told You Lately (Live)" | Rod Stewart | 5 | June 19 | 8 |
| June 5 | "Bad Boys" (theme from Cops) | Inner Circle | 8 | June 12 | 4 |
| June 12 | "Come Undone" | Duran Duran | 7 | June 19 | 5 |
| June 26 | "Whoomp! (There It Is)" (#2) | Tag Team | 2 | July 31 | 24 |
| June 26 | "Dre Day" | Dr. Dre featuring Snoop Doggy Dogg | 8 | July 3 | 4 |
| July 3 | "Can't Help Falling in Love" (#3) | UB40 | 1 | July 24 | 15 |
| July 3 | "I'll Never Get Over You (Getting Over Me)" | Exposé | 8 | July 17 | 5 |
| July 17 | "I'm Gonna Be (500 Miles)" | The Proclaimers | 3 | August 21 | 8 |
| July 24 | "Slam" | Onyx | 4 | August 21 | 6 |
| July 31 | "Lately" | Jodeci | 4 | August 28 | 9 |
| August 7 | "If I Had No Loot" | Tony! Toni! Toné! | 7 | August 7 | 6 |
| August 7 | "I Don't Wanna Fight" | Tina Turner | 9 | August 14 | 2 |
| August 14 | "Runaway Train" | Soul Asylum | 5 | August 28 | 9 |
| August 14 | "If" | Janet Jackson | 4 | September 11 | 11 |
| August 21 | "Dreamlover" (#8) | Mariah Carey | 1 | September 11 | 14 |
| September 4 | "Right Here/Human Nature" / "Downtown" | SWV | 2 | October 2 | 9 |
| September 4 | "Will You Be There" | Michael Jackson | 7 | September 11 | 6 |
| September 11 | "The River of Dreams" | Billy Joel | 3 | October 16 | 9 |
| September 18 | "Baby I'm Yours" | Shai | 10 | September 18 | 3 |
| October 2 | "Another Sad Love Song" | Toni Braxton | 7 | October 9 | 3 |
| October 9 | "I'd Do Anything for Love (But I Won't Do That)" | Meat Loaf | 1 | November 6 | 14 |
| October 16 | "Just Kickin' It" | Xscape | 2 | October 23 | 9 |
| October 16 | "All That She Wants" | Ace of Base | 2 | November 6 | 18 |
| October 16 | "Hey Mr. D.J." | Zhané | 6 | October 30 | 7 |
| October 23 | "Anniversary" | Tony! Toni! Toné! | 10 | October 23 | 4 |
| October 30 | "Again" | Janet Jackson | 1 | December 11 | 15 |
| November 6 | "Gangsta Lean" | DRS | 4 | November 20 | 11 |
| November 13 | "Shoop" | Salt-N-Pepa | 4 | December 4 | 11 |
| November 20 | "Please Forgive Me" | Bryan Adams | 7 | November 20 | 8 |
| November 20 | "Hero" | Mariah Carey | 1 | December 25 | 16 |

=== 1992 peaks ===
List of Billboard Hot 100 Top 10 singles in 1993 which peaked in 1992
| Top ten entry date | Single | Artist(s) | Peak | Peak date | Weeks in top ten |
|---|---|---|---|---|---|
| October 10 | "I'd Die Without You" | P.M. Dawn | 3 | October 31 | 16 |
| November 7 | "Rump Shaker" (#9) | Wreckx-n-Effect | 2 | December 26 | 15 |
| November 7 | "Real Love" | Mary J. Blige | 7 | December 5 | 9 |
| November 7 | "What About Your Friends" | TLC | 7 | November 21 | 10 |
| November 14 | "If I Ever Fall in Love" (#7) | Shai | 2 | November 21 | 15 |
| November 28 | "I Will Always Love You" (#1) | Whitney Houston | 1 | November 28 | 16 |
| November 28 | "Good Enough" | Bobby Brown | 7 | December 26 | 10 |

=== 1994 peaks ===
List of Billboard Hot 100 Top 10 singles in 1993 which peaked in 1994
| Top ten entry date | Single | Artist(s) | Peak | Peak date | Weeks in top ten |
|---|---|---|---|---|---|
| December 4 | "Breathe Again" | Toni Braxton | 3 | January 22 | 17 |
| December 4 | "Can We Talk" | Tevin Campbell | 9 | January 15 | 4 |
| December 11 | "All for Love" | Bryan Adams, Rod Stewart, and Sting | 1 | January 22 | 14 |
| December 18 | "Said I Loved You...But I Lied" | Michael Bolton | 6 | January 22 | 9 |
| December 25 | "What's My Name?" | Snoop Doggy Dogg | 8 | January 1 | 4 |

== See also ==
- 1993 in music
- List of Billboard Hot 100 number ones of 1993
- Billboard Year-End Hot 100 singles of 1993
