= Billboard Music Award for Top Rap Song =

Independent music award

The Billboard Music Award for Top Rap Song winners and nominees. This award has been given to "Fancy", "The Phuncky Feel One", "Hot in Herre", "See You Again", "I'll Be Missing You", and "Love the Way You Lie".

== Winners and nominees ==
Year	Song	Artist	Nominees
1992	"The Phuncky Feel One"	Cypress Hill	
1993	"We Getz Busy"	Illegal	Digable Planets - "Rebirth of Slick (Cool Like Dat)"; Positive K - "I Got a Man"; Lords of the Underground - "Chief Rocka"
1995	"One More Chance/Stay with Me"	The Notorious B.I.G	The Notorious B.I.G - "Big Poppa/Warning"; Coolio - "Gangsta's Paradise"; Method Man featuring Mary J. Blige - "I'll Be There for You/You're All I Need to Get By"
1997	"I'll Be Missing You"	Sean Combs featuring Faith Evans and 112	Sean Combs featuring Mase - "Can't Nobody Hold Me Down"; MC Lyte - "Cold Rock a Party"; Foxy Brown featuring Jay Z - "I'll Be"
1998	"Deja Vu (Uptown Baby)"	Lord Tariq & Peter Gunz	Wyclef Jean - "Gone till November"; Mase - "What You Want"; Sean Combs & The Family - "Been Around the World"
1999	"Who Dat"	JT Money featuring Solé	Busta Rhymes featuring Janet Jackson - "What's It Gonna Be?!"; Silkk the Shocker - "Somebody Like Me"; Mo Thugs featuring Bone Thugs-N-Harmony - "Ghetto Cowboy"
2001	"Bow Wow (That's My Name)"	Bow Wow featuring Snoop Dogg	City High - "What Would You"; Lil Romeo - "My Baby"; Outkast - "Ms. Jackson"
2002	"Hot in Herre"	Nelly	Nelly featuring Kelly Rowland - "Dilemma"; Fat Joe featuring Ashanti - "What's Luv?"; Ja Rule featuring Ashanti - "Always on Time"
2005	"Lovers and Friends"	Lil Jon and The East Side Boyz featuring Usher and Ludacris	The Game featuring 50 Cent - "How We Do"; 50 Cent featuring Olivia - "Candy Shop"; Snoop Dogg featuring Pharrell Williams - "Drop It Like It's Hot"
2011	"Love the Way You Lie"	Eminem featuring Rihanna	B.o.B featuring Hayley Williams - "Airplanes"; B.o.B featuring Bruno Mars - "Nothin' on You"; Far East Movement featuring The Cataracs and Dev - "Like a G6"; Nelly - "Just a Dream"
2012	"Party Rock Anthem"	LMFAO featuring Lauren Bennett and GoonRock	LMFAO - "Sexy and I Know It"; Nicki Minaj - "Super Bass"; Pitbull featuring Ne-Yo, Afrojack, and Nayer - "Give Me Everything"; Flo Rida - "Good Feeling"
2013	"Thrift Shop"	Macklemore & Ryan Lewis featuring Wanz	Flo Rida - "Whistle"; Flo Rida featuring Sia - "Wild Ones"; Psy - "Gangnam Style"; Kanye West, Big Sean, Pusha T, and 2 Chainz - "Mercy"
2014	"Can't Hold Us"	Macklemore & Ryan Lewis featuring Ray Dalton	Pitbull featuring Kesha - "Timber"; Eminem featuring Rihanna - "The Monster"; Jay Z featuring Justin Timberlake - "Holy Grail"; Macklemore & Ryan Lewis - "Thrift Shop"
2015	"Fancy"	Iggy Azalea featuring Charli XCX	Iggy Azalea featuring Rita Ora - "Black Widow"; Big Sean featuring E-40 - "I Don't Fuck with You"; Nicki Minaj - "Anaconda"; Bobby Shmurda - "Hot Nigga"
2016	"See You Again"	Wiz Khalifa featuring Charlie Puth	Drake - "Hotline Bling"; Fetty Wap - "Trap Queen"; Fetty Wap featuring Remy Boyz - "679"; Silentó - "Watch Me (Whip/Nae Nae)"
2017	"Panda"	Desiigner	Drake - “Fake Love” DRAM featuring Lil Yachty - "Broccoli"; Migos featuring Lil Uzi Vert - “Bad and Boujee” Rae Sremmurd featuring Gucci Mane - "Black Beatles"
2018	"Rockstar"	Post Malone featuring 21 Savage	Cardi B - "Bodak Yellow (Money Moves)"; DJ Khaled featuring Justin Bieber, Quavo, Chance the Rapper and Lil Wayne - "I'm the One"; French Montana featuring Swae Lee - "Unforgettable"; Kendrick Lamar - "Humble."
2019	“I Like It”	Cardi B with Bad Bunny and J Balvin	Drake - "In My Feelings"; Juice WRLD - "Lucid Dreams"; Post Malone - "Better Now"; Travis Scott - "Sicko Mode"
2020	"Old Town Road"	Lil Nas X featuring Billy Ray Cyrus	Lil Tecca - "Ransom"; Lizzo - "Truth Hurts"; Post Malone and Swae Lee - "Sunflower"; Post Malone - "Wow"
2021	"Rockstar"	DaBaby featuring Roddy Ricch	24kGoldn featuring Iann Dior - "Mood"; Cardi B featuring Megan Thee Stallion - "WAP"; Jack Harlow featuring DaBaby, Tory Lanez and Lil Wayne - "Whats Poppin"; Megan Thee Stallion - "Savage"
2022	"Industry Baby"	Lil Nas X featuring Jack Harlow	Drake featuring 21 Savage and Project Pat - "Knife Talk"; Drake featuring Future and Young Thug - "Way 2 Sexy"; Masked Wolf - "Astronaut in the Ocean"; Polo G - "Rapstar"
2023	"Rich Flex"	Drake and 21 Savage	Gunna - "Fukumean"; Coi Leray - "Players"; Lil Durk featuring J. Cole - "All My Life"; Toosii - "Favorite Song"
2024	"Not Like Us"	Kendrick Lamar	Doja Cat - "Agora Hills"; Doja Cat - "Paint the Town Red"; Future, Metro Boomin and Kendrick Lamar - "Like That"; Jack Harlow - "Lovin on Me"

== Superlatives ==
The following individuals received two or more Top Rap Song Awards:

Wins	Artist
2	Macklemore & Ryan Lewis
2	Lil Nas X

The following individuals received two or more Top Rap Song nominations:

Nominations	Artist
6	Drake
4	Post Malone
3	21 Savage
3	Sean Combs
3	Nelly
3	Flo Rida
3	Macklemore & Ryan Lewis
3	Cardi B
2	Ashanti
2	Snoop Dogg
2	50 Cent
2	B.o.B
2	LMFAO
2	Jay-Z
2	Eminem
2	Rihanna
2	Iggy Azalea
2	Big Sean
2	Nicki Minaj
2	Fetty Wap
2	Swae Lee
2	Megan Thee Stallion
2	DaBaby
2	Lil Wayne
2	Lil Nas X
2	Jack Harlow
2	Kendrick Lamar
