= Bo$$ =

Bo$$ may refer to:

- Boss (rapper), sometimes stylized as Bo$$, an American rapper
- ”Boss” (Fifth Harmony song), a 2015 song stylised as "Bo$$"
