= Dazzey Duks (album) =

Studio album by Duice
- Released: December 22, 1992
- Recorded: 1991–1992
- Genre: Bass music
- Length: 37:04
- Label: TMR; Bellmark
- Producer: Tony Mercedes

Singles from Dazzey Duks
- 1. "Dazzey Duks" Released: October 2, 1992; 2. "Duice Is In The House" Released: 1993

Professional ratings
Review scores
Source	Rating
AllMusic	4.5/5 stars
MusicHound R&B: The Essential Album Guide	2.5/5 stars

Dazzey Duks is the debut studio album by American bass music duo Duice. It was released on December 22, 1992, through TMR/Bellmark Records. Production was handled by Tony Mercedes. The album peaked at number 84 on the Billboard 200 and number 26 on the Top R&B Albums. It was certified Gold by the Recording Industry Association of America on January 27, 1994, for selling 500,000 copies in the United States.

Its lead single, "Dazzey Duks", made it to No. 12 on the Billboard Hot 100 and No. 19 on the Hot R&B Songs, as well as received 2× Platinum status by the RIAA. Its second single, "Duice Is in the House", failed to chart.

== Track listing ==
No.	Title	Length
1.	"Dazzey Duks"
2.	"Duice Is in the House"
3.	"Bring the Bass"
4.	"Booty Call"
5.	"Shitty-Shitty"
6.	"Feel What I Feel"
7.	"Pass the Mic"
8.	"The Pawee"
9.	"Dazzey Duks" (Remix - Ruffhouse Version)
Total length:		37:04

== Personnel ==
- Anthony "Creo-D" Darlington – vocals, arranger
- Ira "L.A. Sno" Brown – vocals, arranger
- David Jones – backing vocals
- Nicole Garnett – backing vocals
- Tony "Paragon Productions" Mercedes – producer
- Troy "Taylor Boy" Taylor – arranger
- Deborah Walker – art direction
- Dennis Loren – design
- Alain Bali – cover photography
- Timothy L. Walter – photography

== Charts ==
Chart (1993)	Peak position
US Billboard 200	84
US Top R&B Albums (Billboard)	26

== Certifications ==
Region	Certification	Certified units/sales
United States (RIAA)	Gold	500,000^{^}
^{^} Shipments figures based on certification alone.
