= The Nine Yards =

Studio album by Paperboy
- Released: January 26, 1993
- Recorded: 1991–92
- Studio: Unique (New York)
- Genre: Hip hop
- Length: 39:32
- Label: Next Plateau
- Producer: Rhythm D

Paperboy chronology
| The Nine Yards (1993) | City to City (1996) |

Singles from The Nine Yards
- 1. "Ditty" Released: November 3, 1992

The Nine Yards is the debut studio album by American rapper Paperboy. It was released on January 26, 1993, through Next Plateau Entertainment. The album was produced by Rhythm D, with Aaron Clark, Dave Ferguson and John Ferguson serving as executive producers. It features guest appearances from Rhythm D and Angela Dauphiney. The album peaked at number 48 on the US Billboard 200 and number 26 on the Top R&B/Hip-Hop Albums. It was certified Gold by the Recording Industry Association of America on June 22, 1993, for selling 500,000 units in the United States. Its lead single, "Ditty", reached number 10 on the Billboard Hot 100 and achieved Platinum status by the RIAA.

== Critical reception ==
Professional ratings
Review scores
| Source | Rating |
|---|---|
| AllMusic | 2.5/5 stars |

The Los Angeles Times wrote that "Johnson, in his punchy, machine-gun rap style, spins hard-edged tales of life in the ghetto, riddled with clever, insightful observations, floating on funky beats."

== Track listing ==
| No. | Title | Writer(s) | Length |
|---|---|---|---|
| 1. | "Ditty" (Ben Liebrand Single Mix) | Mitchell Johnson; Aaron Clark; Dave Ferguson; John Ferguson; Roger Troutman; Larry Troutman | 4:01 |
| 2. | "Bumpin' (Adaptation of Humpin')" | Charlie Wilson; Lonnie Simmons; Rudy Taylor; Ronnie Wilson | 4:41 |
| 3. | "Studs" | Johnson; Clark; D. Ferguson; J. Ferguson | 5:33 |
| 4. | "Goin' On" | Johnson; Clark; D. Ferguson; J. Ferguson | 3:58 |
| 5. | "Zooted" | Johnson | 4:40 |
| 6. | "Jack Move" | Johnson; Curtis Mayfield | 2:20 |
| 7. | "The Nine Yards" | Johnson | 3:24 |
| 8. | "Little Somethin' for the Summer" | Johnson; Clark; D. Ferguson; J. Ferguson | 4:11 |
| 9. | "Shoutouts" | Johnson | 2:50 |
| 10. | "Ditty" (Divine Street Mix) | Johnson; Clark; D. Ferguson; J. Ferguson; R. Troutman; L. Troutman | 3:54 |
| Total length: | | | 39:32 |

Sample credits

- Tracks 1 and 10 contain portions of "Doo Wa Ditty (Blow That Thing)" written by Roger Troutman and Larry Troutman
- Track 6 contains elements from "Future Shock" written by Curtis Mayfield

== Personnel ==
- Mitchell "Paperboy" Johnson – main artist
- Angela Dauphiney – backing vocals (tracks: 2, 3)
- David Cochrane – lead guitar, bass, saxophone, flute, engineering
- David "Rhythm D" Weldon – producer, arrangement
- Ben Liebrand – remixer (track 1)
- Desmond "Divine" Houston – remixer (track 10)
- Gary "D.J. GLE" Ellis – engineering, mixing
- Phil Austin – mastering
- Jason Vogel – engineering (track 10)
- Aaron Clark – executive producer
- Dave Ferguson – executive producer
- John Ferguson – executive producer
- Jenniene Leclercq – art direction
- Jeff Faville – design
- Michael Miller – photography

== Charts ==
| Chart (1993) | Peak position |
|---|---|
| US Billboard 200 | 48 |
| US Top R&B/Hip-Hop Albums (Billboard) | 26 |

== Certifications ==
| Region | Certification | Certified units/sales |
|---|---|---|
| United States (RIAA) | Gold | 500,000^{^} |
^{^} Shipments figures based on certification alone.
