= All That Matters (Portrait album) =

Studio album by Portrait
- Released: March 7, 1995
- Recorded: 1994
- Genre: R&B
- Length: 59:44
- Label: Capitol
- Producer: Portrait

Portrait chronology
Portrait (1992)	All That Matters (1995)	Picturesque (1996)

Singles from All That Matters
- 1. "I Can Call You" Released: January 19, 1995; 2. "How Deep is Your Love" Released: May 29, 1995

Professional ratings
Review scores
Source	Rating
AllMusic	3/5 stars
The Indianapolis Star	3/4 stars

All That Matters is the second album by the R&B group Portrait, released in 1995 on Capitol Records.

The album reached number 131 on the Billboard 200 and number 26 on the R&B albums chart.

== Critical reception ==
The Indianapolis Star wrote: "From the whimsical, silky-smooth 'Here's a Kiss'—which opens the disc—to the sultry ballad 'Hold Me Close', the 12 tracks feature warm melodies, tight harmonies, catchy lyrics and lush arrangements."

== Track listing ==
All songs written by Portrait and Maurice Thompson ("Lovin' U is Ah-Ight" & "Here's A Kiss") except for "How Deep Is Your Love", which was written by the Bee Gees (Barry Gibb, Robin Gibb, and Maurice Gibb).

No.	Title	Length
1.	"Here's a Kiss"	4:39
2.	"I Can Call You"	4:38
3.	"All That Matters"	5:47
4.	"All Natural Girl"	4:17
5.	"Friday Night"	4:08
6.	"Interlude: Michael's Mood"	0:59
7.	"Hold Me Close"	5:25
8.	"Lovin' U is Ah-Ight"	4:33
9.	"Much Too Much"	6:16
10.	"Heartstrings"	4:27
11.	"Lay You Down"	6:35
12.	"Me Oh My"	4:13
13.	"How Deep is Your Love"	4:03

== Charts ==
Chart performance for All That Matters
Chart (1995)	Peak position
Australian Albums (ARIA)	46
New Zealand Albums (RMNZ)	9
US Billboard 200	131
US Top R&B/Hip-Hop Albums (Billboard)	26
