= Back in the Day (Illegal song) =

Single by Illegal

from the album The Untold Truth
- B-side: "Stick 'Em Up"
- Released: March 14, 1994
- Recorded: 1993
- Genre: Hip hop
- Length: 5:10
- Label: Rowdy; Arista
- Songwriter(s): Jamal Phillips; Malik Edwards
- Producer(s): Colin Wolfe

Illegal singles chronology
"We Getz Busy" (1993)	"Back in the Day" (1994)

Music video
- "Back in the Day" on YouTube

"Back in the Day" is the third and final single released from Illegal's debut album, The Untold Truth. It was written by members Jamal and Malik, each detailing their hardships growing up before they received a record deal. The song peaked at 80 on the Hot R&B/Hip-Hop Singles & Tracks and 21 on the Hot Rap Singles and was the last release from Illegal. The song was produced by Colin Wolfe.

== Music video ==
The music video features cameos by Snoop Doggy Dogg and Tha Dogg Pound.

== Single track listing ==
=== A-Side ===
1. "Back in the Day" (Rowdy Main Mix)- 5:05
2. "Back in the Day" (Radio Edit)- 4:15
3. "Back in the Day" (Accapella Mix)- 4:59
4. "Back in the Day" (Percapella Mix)- 5:02

=== B-Side ===
1. "Back in the Day" (Album Version)- 5:10
2. "Back in the Day" (Extended Instrumental)- 3:20
3. "Stick 'Em Up"- 4:22
