= The Untold Truth =

Studio album by Illegal
- Released: August 24, 1993
- Recorded: 1992–1993
- Studio: D.A.R.P. Studios (Atlanta, GA); Soundtrack Studios (New York, NY); BMV Digital Studio (Newark, NJ)
- Genre: Hip hop
- Length: 50:36
- Label: Rowdy; Arista
- Producer: Dallas Austin (also exec.); Colin Wolfe; Diamond D; Erick Sermon; Spearhead X; Biz Markie; Cool V; E-Locc; Lord Finesse

Singles from The Untold Truth
- 1. "Head or Gut" Released: April 5, 1993; 2. "We Getz Busy" Released: August 4, 1993; 3. "Back in the Day" Released: March 14, 1994

Professional ratings
Review scores
Source	Rating
AllMusic	4/5 stars
RapReviews	6.5/10

The Untold Truth is the only studio album by American rap duo Illegal, composed of rappers Jamal and Mr. Malik. It was released on August 24, 1993, through Rowdy Records with distribution via Arista Records. The recording sessions took place from late Fall 1992 to mid-Summer 1993 at D.A.R.P. Studios in Atlanta, at Soundtrack Studios in New York City, and at BMV Digital Studios in Newark. The album was produced by Dallas Austin, Diamond D, Erick Sermon, Biz Markie, and Lord Finesse, among others.

The album peaked at No. 119 on the Billboard 200 and No. 19 on the Top R&B/Hip-Hop Albums. It spawned three singles: "Back in the Day", and the Kris Kross/Da Youngsta's diss tracks "Head or Gut" and "We Getz Busy".

== Track listing ==
No.	Title	Producer(s)	Length
1.	"Back in the Day"	Colin Wolfe	5:12
2.	"Illegal Will Rock"	Diamond D	5:01
3.	"Head or Gut"	Erick Sermon	3:57
4.	"CrumbSnatcher"	Diamond D	3:55
5.	"We Getz Busy"	Erick Sermon	3:50
6.	"Stick 'Em Up"	Colin Wolfe	4:26
7.	"Understand the Flow"	Dallas Austin	4:48
8.	"On da M.I.C."	Lord Finesse	4:50
9.	"Ban da Iggidy"	Dallas Austin	4:14
10.	"Lights, Camera, Action"	Spearhead X	5:03
11.	"Interlude"	Spearhead X; E-Locc	0:29
12.	"If U Want It"	Biz Markie; Cool V	5:11
Total length:			50:36

== Personnel ==
- Jamal Phillips – vocals
- Malik Edwards – vocals
- Joseph Kirkland – vocals (track 4), producer (tracks: 2, 4)
- Erick Sermon – vocals (track 5), producer (tracks: 3, 5)
- Robert Hall Jr. – vocals & producer (track 8)
- Andre Barnes – vocals (track 8)
- Colin Wolfe – producer (tracks: 1, 6)
- Dallas Austin – producer (tracks: 7, 9), executive producer
- Xavier Hargrove – producer (tracks: 10, 11)
- Melvin "E-Locc" Davis – producer (track 11)
- Marcel Theo Hall – producer (track 12)
- Vaughan Lee – producer (track 12)
- Alvin Speights – mixing & recording (tracks: 1, 2, 6, 7, 9)
- George Pappas – mixing & recording (tracks: 1, 10)
- Gregory Mann – mixing & recording (tracks: 3, 10)
- John Lawrence Byas – mixing & recording (track 4)
- Darin Prindle – mixing & recording (track 5)
- Troy Hightower – mixing & recording (track 8)
- Everett "Bizz-E" Ramos – mixing & recording (track 12)
- José L. Rodriguez – mastering
- Christopher Stern – art direction
- Danny Clinch – photography

== Charts ==
Chart (1993)	Peak position
US Billboard 200	119
US Top R&B/Hip-Hop Albums (Billboard)	19
