= Mickey Unrapped =

1994 compilation album by Walt Disney

Compilation album by various artists
- Released: 1994
- Genre: Children's music, hip hop
- Label: Walt Disney; Bellmark

Mickey Unrapped is a 1994 rap parody compilation album produced by Walt Disney Records.

== Background and composition ==
The album was conceived as a joint venture between Walt Disney Records and Bellmark Records, with both companies seeking to expand their markets. A quarter of a million records were produced by Disney due to them anticipating "major crossover success" with the album. Mickey Unrapped was promoted extensively, with Disney running advertisements in Cable television and UHF channels starting on August 15, as well as an "aggressive" advertising push and print ads. Michael Becker, a graduate of the Berklee College of Music, was given the role of co-producer and wrote seven of the twelve tracks of the album.

The third track, "Whoomp! (There It Went)", is a spoof of Tag Team's "Whoomp! (There It Is). It peaked at No. 97 in the Billboard Hot 100, becoming the duo's first charting single since the release of "Whoomp! (There It Is)". The fifth track, "Bowwow to the Beat" is performed by Whoopi Goldberg portraying Pluto. The twelfth and final track, "Color of Music", featured an appearance from Color Me Badd.

== Critical reception ==
Michele Romero, writing for Entertainment Weekly, rated it positively, noting that "Mickey benefits from the same multigenerational appeal that sent The Lion King soundtrack roaring to the top of Mount Billboard" and lauded the "clever samplings of old Mickey Mouse Club kids yelling 'yeah Mickey' coupled with a heart-pounding bass line" in the single "Mickey Mouse Club Mix". However, she criticized how " Mickey’s goofiness sometimes comes off as incredibly stupid", comparing some of the lyrics to Amos 'n' Andy. Heather Phares, in her review for AllMusic called it "an enjoyable, if somewhat dated album", noting that "Mickey Unrapped has fun with kid-friendly hip-hop tunes."

Ira A. Robbins, writing for Newsday, stated that "unfortunately, the rhyming mouse is strictly a sucker MC", criticizing the "squeaky falsetto" of Mickey while noting that "rap has become so broadly assimilated into mainstream youth culture that its innocuous side is now deemed fit for Disney's child-oriented exploitation". Cash Box was more critical, calling it "a marriage made in some netherworld between the streets and the increasing corporate sweetening of rap music" and criticized Tag Team for being "the conduit for this shameless send-up".

== Track listing ==
No.	Title	Length
1.	"Ice Ice Mickey"	02:31
2.	"Minnie Mouse in the House"	02:58
3.	"Whoomp! (There It Went)"	03:35
4.	"Whatta Mouse"	03:39
5.	"Bowwow to the Beat"	03:06
6.	"D.J. Goof"	02:38
7.	"Ducks in the 'Hood"	02:40
8.	"M.C. Mickey"	02:56
9.	"U Can't Botch This"	02:11
10.	"Little Red Rappinghood"	02:45
11.	"Mickey Mouse Club Mix"	02:59
12.	"The Color of Music"	01:38

== Charts ==
Chart (1994)	Peak position
US Billboard 200	173

Chart (1996)	Peak position
US Top Kid Audio (Billboard)	7
