= Born Gangstaz =

Studio album by Bo$$
- Released: May 25, 1993
- Recorded: 1991–93
- Studio: Beat Street (Hollywood, California); Rockin Reel (Commack, New York); Mad Hatter; M'Bila; Westlake (Los Angeles, California); Chung King (New York City); Ian London (East Islip, New York)
- Genre: Gangsta rap
- Length: 47:21
- Label: DJ West; Chaos; Columbia; Sony Music
- Producer: AMG; Chyskillz; Def Jef; Erick Sermon; Jam Master Jay; Mic Professah; Stone Tha Lunatic; Tracey Waples; T-Ray; MC Serch; Courtney Branch; Tracy Kendrick

Singles from Born Gangstaz
- 1. "I Don't Give a Fuck" / "Mai Sista Izza Bitch" Released: 1992; 2. "Deeper" Released: March 16, 1993; 3. "Recipe of a Hoe" Released: July 6, 1993; 4. "Progress of Elimination" Released: October 12, 1993

Born Gangstaz is the only studio album by American gangsta rapper Bo$$. It was released on May 25, 1993, through Def Jam Recordings' West Coast-based sub-label DJ West. The recording sessions took place at Beat Street Studios, Mad Hatter Studios, M'Bila Studios and Westlake Audio in Los Angeles, at Rockin' Reel Recording Studios in Commack, at Chung King Studios in New York City, and at Ian London Studios in East Islip, New York. The album was produced by Def Jef, AMG, Erick Sermon, T-Ray, Chyskillz, Jam Master Jay, Mic Professah, Stone tha Lunatic, and Tracey Waples, who also served as executive producer together with Russell Simmons, and co-producers MC Serch, Courtney Branch and Tracy Kendrick. It features guest appearances from Def Jef, Onyx, AMG, Erick Sermon, dancehall performers Admiral D and Papa Juggy, as well as Bo$$'s parents, Lillie and Joe Laws.

The album debuted at number 22 on the Billboard 200 and number 3 on the Top R&B/Hip-Hop Albums in the United States.

It features two the Billboard charted singles: "Deeper" and "Recipe of a Hoe". "I Don't Give a Fuck" b/w "Mai Sista Izza Bitch" and "Progress of Elimination" also were released as singles.

Despite the success of this album, Boss never released another album during her lifetime. Born Gangstaz has sold around 500,000 copies. The working title of the album was They Don't Have the Body Count.

The song "I Don't Give a Fuck" featured during the closing credits of the episode "Lesbian Request Denied" from Season 1 of the Netflix TV show Orange Is the New Black.

== Critical reception ==
Professional ratings
Review scores
Source	Rating
AllMusic	4/5 stars
Christgau's Consumer Guide	(choice cut)
Entertainment Weekly	A−
Los Angeles Times	3/4 stars
RapReviews	7.5/10
The Source	4/5 stars

USA Today said that Born Gangstaz "is so shockingly roughneck, it makes N.W.A sound like Sunday school teachers." The Guardian wrote: "The lady explains, 'Here's a bitch that don't give a fuck'. Whether or not that's true—and one suspects that Boss is more of an actress than a gangsta—it's pretty sad that she wants to compete with men in this area."

== Retrospect ==
Magazine	Country	Article	Year	Rank
Spin	United States	"The 50 Best Rap Albums from 1993"	2013	17

== Track listing ==
No.	Title	Writer(s)	Producer(s)	Length
1.	"Intro: A Call from Mom" (featuring Lillie Laws)	Lichelle Laws; Jeffrey Fortson	Def Jef	0:47
2.	"Deeper" (featuring Papa Juggy and Def Jef)	Roger Samuels; Fortson; Clarence Reid; Ricardo Royal	Def Jef	3:59
3.	"Comin' to Getcha" (featuring Erick Sermon)	Laws; Erick Sermon	Erick Sermon	3:30
4.	"Mai Sista Izza Bitch" (featuring AMG)	Laws; Jason Lewis	AMG; Courtney Branch (exec.); Tracy Kendrick (exec.); Greg Jessie (exec.)	3:01
5.	"Thelma and Louise"	Laws; Irene Moore; Fortson	Def Jef	0:57
6.	"Drive By"	Laws; Moore; Angelo Trotter IV	Stone tha Lunatic	4:01
7.	"Progress of Elimination"	Royal; Fortson	Def Jef	3:12
8.	"Livin' Loc'd" (featuring Onyx)	Laws; Jason Mizell; Chylow Parker	Jam Master Jay; Chyskillz	3:37
9.	"Recipe of a Hoe"	Laws; Rodney Caple	Mic Professah	4:29
10.	"A Blind Date with Boss" (featuring Onyx)	Laws; Moore; Fredro Scruggs; Kirk Jones	Tracey Waples	1:00
11.	"Catch a Bad One"	Laws; Moore; Fortson	Def Jef	3:43
12.	"Born Gangsta" (featuring Admiral D)	Laws; Moore; B.J. Reeves; Lewis	AMG; Courtney Branch (co.); Tracy Kendrick (co.)	3:22
13.	"1-800-Body-Bags"	Laws; Moore; Fortson; K. Fulton; V. Edwards	Def Jef	0:35
14.	"Diary of a Mad Bitch"	Laws; Todd Ray; Michael Berrin	T-Ray; MC Serch (co.)	3:05
15.	"2 to da Head"	Laws; Moore; Sermon	Erick Sermon	3:39
16.	"I Don't Give a Fuck"	Laws; Moore; Ray; Berrin	T-Ray; MC Serch (co.)	3:53
17.	"Outro: A Call from Dad" (featuring Joe Laws)	Laws; Fortson	Def Jef	0:31
Total length:				47:21

== Charts ==
Chart (1993)	Peak position
US Billboard 200	22
US Top R&B/Hip-Hop Albums (Billboard)	3

=== Singles ===
Year	Song	Chart positions			
Year	Song	Hot 100	R&B	Rap	Dance
1993	"Deeper"	65	28	1	25
1993	"Recipe of a Hoe"	118^{[A]}	73	1	29

^{[A]} Number 18 on the Bubbling Under Hot 100 Singles chart.
