= The Skills Dat Pay da Bills =

Studio album by Positive K
- Released: November 3, 1992
- Recorded: 1991–1992
- Genre: Hip hop
- Length: 1:04:52
- Label: Island
- Producer: Big Daddy Kane; Dave Thomas; Easy L.G.; Jazzy Jay; Jim Nice; Laze-E-Laze; Rich Lord; Silver D; the LG Experience; Vance Wright

Positive K chronology
The Skills Dat Pay da Bills (1992)	Gr8te Mindz (2017)

Singles from The Skills Dat Pay da Bills
- 1. "Nightshift" Released: 1992; 2. "I Got a Man" Released: 1992; 3. "Ain't No Crime" Released: 1993; 4. "Carhoppers" Released: 1993

The Skills Dat Pay da Bills is the debut studio album by American rapper Positive K. It was released on November 3, 1992, via Island Records. The album was produced by Easy L.G., Silver D, Big Daddy Kane, Dave Thomas, Jazzy Jay, Jim Nice, Laze-E-Laze, Rich Lord, the LG Experience, and Vance Wright, with Blossette Kitson serving as executive producer. It features a guest appearance from Grand Daddy I.U.

The album peaked at number 168 on the Billboard 200 and number 50 on the Top R&B/Hip-Hop Albums charts in the United States.

It was supported with four singles: "Nightshift", "I Got a Man", "Ain't No Crime" and "Carhoppers". Its lead single, "Night Shift", peaked at number 17 on the US Billboard Hot Rap Songs. Its second single, "I Got a Man", became a hit, reaching number 14 on both the Billboard Hot 100 and Dutch Top 40, number 41 in New Zealand and number 43 on the UK singles chart, as well as received Gold certification by the Recording Industry Association of America. The third single off of the album, "Ain't No Crime", made it to number 16 on the Hot Rap Songs.

== Critical reception ==
Professional ratings
Review scores
Source	Rating
AllMusic	4/5 stars
Entertainment Weekly	B−
The Indianapolis Star	2/4 stars
The Source	4/5 stars

The Indianapolis Star wrote that K's "fast-talking rap, over a repetitive funky bass and homemade drum program, mostly brags about hitting the big time." The Morning Call listed The Skills Dat Pay da Bills among the worst albums of 1993.

== Track listing ==
The Skills Side
No.	Title	Producer(s)	Length
1.	"Intro (Pos K Theme)"	Vance Wright	0:57
2.	"Pass the Mic"	Silver D	4:46
3.	"One 2 the Head"	Jazzy Jay; Easy L.G. (co.)	4:10
4.	"Shakin'"	Easy L.G.	5:00
5.	"How the Fuck Would You Know"	Easy L.G.	5:13
6.	"Carhoppers"	The LG Experience	4:12
7.	"Nightshift"	Big Daddy Kane	4:10

Pay The Bills Side
No.	Title	Producer(s)	Length
8.	"Intro (Back the Fuck Up)"	Dave Thomas	1:08
9.	"I Got a Man"	Easy L.G.	3:50
10.	"Ain't No Crime"	Jim Nice	6:07
11.	"The Shout Out"	Easy L.G.	2:37
12.	"Friends"	Rich Lord	4:52
13.	"Minnie the Moocher" (featuring Grand Daddy I.U.)	Laze-E-Laze	4:11
14.	"Nightshift" (Remix)	Silver D	4:40
15.	"A Flower Grows in Brooklyn"	Easy L.G.	4:07
16.	"It's All Over"	Easy L.G.	4:52
Total length:			1:04:52

== Charts ==
Chart (1993)	Peak position
US Billboard 200	168
US Top R&B/Hip-Hop Albums (Billboard)	50
