= Portrait (Portrait album) =

Studio album by Portrait
- Released: October 12, 1992
- Recorded: 1991–1992
- Studio: Aire L.A. Elumba Recording; Larrabee West; One Up Studio; Trax Recording (Los Angeles, California)
- Genre: R&B, new jack swing
- Length: 66:31
- Label: Capitol
- Producer: Portrait

Portrait chronology
Portrait (1992)	All That Matters (1995)

Singles from Portrait
- 1. "Here We Go Again!" Released: 1992; 2. "Honey Dip" Released: 1993; 3. "Day By Day" Released: 1993

Professional ratings
Review scores
Source	Rating
AllMusic	3/5 stars

Portrait is the debut album of the R&B group Portrait, released in 1992 on Capitol Records.

The album reached number 70 on the Billboard 200 and number 16 on the US Top R&B Albums chart.

== Track listing ==
- All songs written by Michael Angelo Saulsberry, Eric Kirkland, Philip Johnson and Irving Washington III, except as noted
1. "Commitment" – 5:23
2. "Honey Dip" – 4:02
3. "Here We Go Again!" – 4:27
4. "You" (Michael Angelo Saulsberry, Eric Kirkland, Philip Johnson, Irving Washington III, Suamana Brown) – 4:53
5. "Interlude: Passion" – 0:53
6. "On and On" – 5:31
7. "Precious Moments" – 4:41
8. "Down Wit Dat" – 4:41
9. "Interlude: Snap Along!" – 0:07
10. "Problems" – 4:57
11. "Feelings" – 3:59
12. "Day by Day" – 5:20
13. "Heartache" – 4:59
14. "Yours Forever" – 5:29
15. "Interlude: Why?" (Michael Angelo Saulsberry, Eric Kirkland, Philip Johnson, Irving Washington III, Suamana Brown) – 1:44
16. "Here We Go Again!" (Extended Remix) – 5:24

== Personnel ==
- Michael Angelo Saulsberry – producer, writer, all instruments and vocal arrangement
- Eric Kirkland – writer, vocal arrangement and drum programming
- Sekou Bunch – bass guitar
- Irving Washington III – writer, vocals, vocal arrangement
- Phillip Johnson – writer, vocals
- Thomas Organ – lead guitar, bass guitar, acoustic guitar
- Curtis Bushey – lead guitar
- Ray Brown – trumpet
- Gerald Albright – saxophone
- Bret Bouldin – rap
- Portrait, The Jets, Carolyn Griffey, Tiara LeMacks, Suamana Brown, Dajhi McBeth, E-Luv, M. "Bay" Botiz, Ken "Wolfie" Washington – background vocals
- Gregg Barrett, Fil Brown, Vincent Cirilli, Jon Guggenheim, Donnell Sullivan – recording engineer
- Dave Way, Anthony Jefferies, Donnell Sullivan, Craig Burbidge – mixing
- Ron McMaster, Eddy Schreyer – mastering
- Scott Folks, Joy Bailey – executive producer
- David Roth – photography
- Tommy Steele – art direction
- Bill Burks – design

== Charts ==
Chart performance for Portrait
Chart (1993)	Peak Opposition
Australian Albums (ARIA)	100
US Billboard 200	70
US Top R&B/Hip-Hop Albums (Billboard)	16
