= Bellmark Records =

American independent record label

Bellmark Records was a small American independent record label, based in Los Angeles, California. It was formed in 1989 by Al Bell, who was one of the driving forces behind Stax Records, having been its chairman and CEO, and who had also been president of Motown Records. The company's name was derived from the phrase "Al Bell Marketing". Initially, Bellmark's records were distributed by CEMA, but the company switched to independent distribution in 1991.

The Bellmark Records organization included the Bellmark Records label itself, which was intended to be used for gospel and spiritual music, as well as the Life Records imprint, which was intended for other genres of African-American music; however, the overall manufacturing and marketing arm of the corporation went by the "Bellmark" name. Bellmark also had manufacturing, marketing, and distribution arrangements with a variety of labels, among them TMR Records. Bell said in a 1994 profile that he wanted to emphasize "positive, fun, entertaining party music".

The biggest hit records distributed by Bellmark were "Dazzey Duks" by Duice, on the TMR label, which was certified double platinum; "Whoomp! (There It Is)" by Tag Team, on the Life label, which was certified quadruple platinum; and "The Most Beautiful Girl in the World" by Prince, on the NPG label. When Prince secured permission from Warner Bros. Records to release the latter song independently, Levi Seacer, president of Prince's NPG Records, arranged with Bellmark to distribute "The Most Beautiful Girl in the World" as a single, as well as The Beautiful Experience, an EP of remixes of the song. "The Most Beautiful Girl in the World" was a #3 hit in the U.S. on the Billboard Hot 100 and was certified gold. "The Most Beautiful Girl in the World" was Prince's last top 10 hit on the Billboard Hot 100 of his lifetime.

Some of Bellmark's gospel artists received Grammy nominations: The Rance Allen Group was nominated for Best Contemporary Soul Gospel Album for Phenomenon (1991), Walter Hawkins and the Hawkins Family were nominated for Best Traditional Soul Gospel Album for New Dawning (1996), and the Edwin Hawkins Music & Arts Seminar was nominated for Best Gospel Album by a Choir or Chorus for All Things Are Possible (1996).

In 1994, Bellmark collaborated with Walt Disney Records on an album titled Mickey Unrapped, which featured parodies of rap songs, among them "Whoomp! (There It Went)", performed by Tag Team with Disney characters. This was the first time Walt Disney Records had collaborated with another record label on a non-soundtrack release.

In 1997, Bellmark Records filed for bankruptcy. As a result, DM Records, Inc. purchased substantially all of Bellmark's assets for $166,000 in 1999.

== See also ==
- List of record labels
