= We Getz Busy =

"We Getz Buzy"

Single by Illegal

from the album The Untold Truth
- Released: October 4, 1993
- Recorded: 1993
- Genre: Hip hop
- Length: 3:40
- Label: Rowdy
- Composer: Erick Sermon
- Lyricists: LaMorris Edwards; Jamal Phillips
- Producer: Erick Sermon

Illegal singles chronology
"Head or Gut" (1993)	"We Getz Buzy" (1993)	"Back in the Day" (1994)

"We Getz Buzy" is a song written and performed by American hip hop duo Illegal. It was released on October 4, 1993 through Rowdy Records as the second single from the duo's only studio album The Untold Truth. Production was handled by Erick Sermon.

The song became the most successful of the three singles the group released during their brief existence, making it to number 95 on the Billboard Hot 100, number 57 on the Hot R&B/Hip-Hop Songs, number-one on the Hot Rap Songs and number 27 on the Dance Singles Sales in the United States. It won a Billboard Music Award for Top Rap Song in 1993.

The official remix version was done by Diamond D.

== Track listing ==
CS
No.	Title	Length
1.	"We Getz Buzy" (Album Version)	3:40
2.	"We Getz Buzy" (Instrumental)	3:40

12" vinyl
No.	Title	Length
1.	"We Getz Buzy (Remix)" (Radio Edit)	3:40
2.	"We Getz Buzy (Remix)" (TV Edit)	3:40
3.	"We Getz Buzy (Remix)" (Buzy Vibe Mix)	3:40
4.	"We Getz Buzy (Remix)" (Rowdy Main Mix)	3:40
5.	"We Getz Buzy (Remix)" (Alternate Vocal Mix)	3:40
6.	"We Getz Buzy (Remix)" (Jeep Vibe)	5:50

== Charts ==
Chart (1993)	Peak position
US Billboard Hot 100	95
US Hot R&B/Hip-Hop Songs (Billboard)	57
US Hot Rap Songs (Billboard)	1
US Hot Dance Music/Maxi-Singles Sales (Billboard)	27
