= Recipe of a Hoe =

Single by Boss

from the album Born Gangstaz
- B-side: "Born Gangsta"
- Released: July 6, 1993
- Recorded: 1993, Chung King Studios, NY NY
- Genre: Dirty rap
- Length: 4:29
- Label: Def Jam
- Songwriter: Lichelle Laws
- Producer: Mic Professah

Boss singles chronology
| "Deeper" (1993) | "Recipe of a Hoe" (1993) | "Progress of Elimination" (1993) |

"Recipe of a Hoe" is the second single released from Boss' debut album, Born Gangstaz. Though the single was not as successful as her previous one, "Recipe of a Hoe" still managed to become her second consecutive single to reach #1 on the Hot Rap Singles chart.

== Single track listing ==
=== A-Side ===
1. "Recipe of a Hoe" (Radio Edit)- 4:16
2. "Recipe of a Hoe" (Instrumental)- 4:30

=== B-Side ===
1. "Recipe of a Hoe" (LP Version)- 4:29
2. "Born Gangsta" 3:32

== Charts ==
| Chart | Position |
|---|---|
| U.S. R&B / Hip-Hop | # 73 |
| Hot Rap Singles | # 1 |
| Hot Dance Music/Maxi-Singles Sales | # 29 |
