= Deeper (Boss song) =

Single by Boss

from the album Born Gangstaz
- B-side: "Drive By"
- Released: 1993
- Recorded: 1993 Beat Street Studios North Hollywood, CA
- Genre: Hardcore hip hop, gangsta rap
- Length: 3:59
- Label: Def Jam
- Songwriters: Lichelle Laws, Jeffrey Fortson
- Producer: Def Jef

Boss singles chronology
"Deeper" (1993)	"Recipe of a Hoe" (1993)

"Deeper" is the first single released from Boss' debut album, Born Gangstaz. Produced by Def Jef, "Deeper" was the most successful single Boss would release during her short career, becoming a #1 hit on the Hot Rap Singles and was her only single to reach the Billboard Hot 100.

== Single track listing ==
=== A-side ===
1. "Deeper" (Radio Edit)- 3:57
2. "Deeper" (Instrumental)- 3:54

=== B-side ===
1. "Deeper" (LP Version)- 3:59
2. "Drive By" (Rollin' Slow Remix)- 3:52

== Charts ==
Chart (1993)	Peak position
US Billboard Hot 100	65
US R&B Singles (Billboard)	28
US Hot Rap Singles (Billboard)	1
US Hot Dance Music/Maxi-Singles Sales (Billboard)	25
US Cash Box Top 100	68

== Samples ==
1. "Deeper" samples vocals from "I'm Gonna Love You Just a Little More Baby" by Barry White.
2. "Deeper" contains an interpolation of Under The Bridge by Red Hot Chili Peppers.
3. "Fire It up" By Da Brat samples Boss's vocals from this song. "Fire It Up" also samples Under The Bridge by Red Hot Chili Peppers.
