= List of Billboard Hot 100 number ones of 1993 =

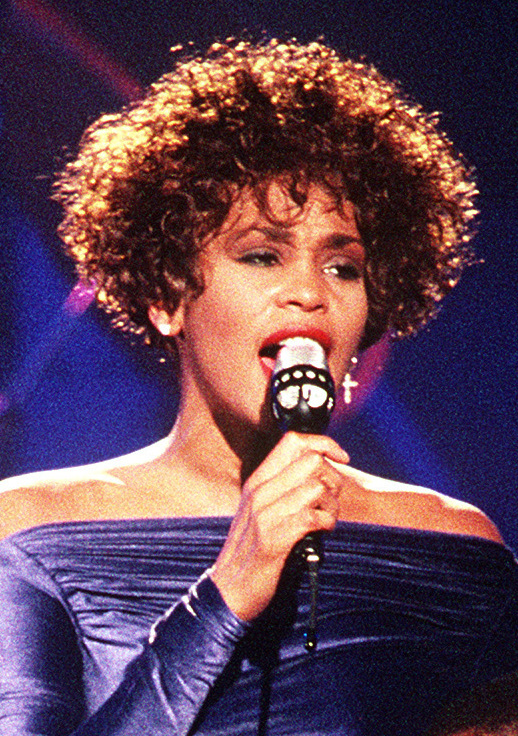
Whitney Houston earned her longest running song on the Hot 100 number-one single with "I Will Always Love You", which stayed at the top position for nine straight weeks.

This is a list of the U.S. Billboard magazine Hot 100 number-ones of 1993. There were 11 singles that topped the chart this year. The first of these, "I Will Always Love You" by Whitney Houston, spent nine weeks at the top, concluding a 14-week run that had begun in November 1992.

That year, 6 acts earn their first number one song: Peabo Bryson, Regina Belle, Snow, Silk, SWV, and Meat Loaf. Janet Jackson and Mariah Carey were the only acts to hit number one more than once, with each of them hitting twice.

== Chart history ==
Key
The yellow background indicates the #1 song on Billboard's 1993 Year-End Chart of Pop Singles.

No.	Issue date	Song	Artist(s)	Ref.
774	January 2	"I Will Always Love You"	Whitney Houston	
774	January 9	"I Will Always Love You"	Whitney Houston	
774	January 16	"I Will Always Love You"	Whitney Houston	
774	January 23	"I Will Always Love You"	Whitney Houston	
774	January 30	"I Will Always Love You"	Whitney Houston	
774	February 6	"I Will Always Love You"	Whitney Houston	
774	February 13	"I Will Always Love You"	Whitney Houston	
774	February 20	"I Will Always Love You"	Whitney Houston	
774	February 27	"I Will Always Love You"	Whitney Houston	
775	March 6	"A Whole New World"	Peabo Bryson and Regina Belle	
776	March 13	"Informer"	Snow	
776	March 20	"Informer"	Snow	
776	March 27	"Informer"	Snow	
776	April 3	"Informer"	Snow	
776	April 10	"Informer"	Snow	
776	April 17	"Informer"	Snow	
776	April 24	"Informer"	Snow	
777	May 1	"Freak Me"	Silk	
777	May 8	"Freak Me"	Silk	
778	May 15	"That's the Way Love Goes"	Janet Jackson	
778	May 22	"That's the Way Love Goes"	Janet Jackson	
778	May 29	"That's the Way Love Goes"	Janet Jackson	
778	June 5	"That's the Way Love Goes"	Janet Jackson	
778	June 12	"That's the Way Love Goes"	Janet Jackson	
778	June 19	"That's the Way Love Goes"	Janet Jackson	
778	June 26	"That's the Way Love Goes"	Janet Jackson	
778	July 3	"That's the Way Love Goes"	Janet Jackson	
779	July 10	"Weak"	SWV	
779	July 17	"Weak"	SWV	
780	July 24	"Can't Help Falling in Love"	UB40	
780	July 31	"Can't Help Falling in Love"	UB40	
780	August 7	"Can't Help Falling in Love"	UB40	
780	August 14	"Can't Help Falling in Love"	UB40	
780	August 21	"Can't Help Falling in Love"	UB40	
780	August 28	"Can't Help Falling in Love"	UB40	
780	September 4	"Can't Help Falling in Love"	UB40	
781	September 11	"Dreamlover"	Mariah Carey	
781	September 18	"Dreamlover"	Mariah Carey	
781	September 25	"Dreamlover"	Mariah Carey	
781	October 2	"Dreamlover"	Mariah Carey	
781	October 9	"Dreamlover"	Mariah Carey	
781	October 16	"Dreamlover"	Mariah Carey	
781	October 23	"Dreamlover"	Mariah Carey	
781	October 30	"Dreamlover"	Mariah Carey	
782	November 6	"I'd Do Anything for Love (But I Won't Do That)"	Meat Loaf	
782	November 13	"I'd Do Anything for Love (But I Won't Do That)"	Meat Loaf	
782	November 20	"I'd Do Anything for Love (But I Won't Do That)"	Meat Loaf	
782	November 27	"I'd Do Anything for Love (But I Won't Do That)"	Meat Loaf	
782	December 4	"I'd Do Anything for Love (But I Won't Do That)"	Meat Loaf	
783	December 11	"Again"	Janet Jackson	
783	December 18	"Again"	Janet Jackson	
784	December 25	"Hero"	Mariah Carey	

== Number-one artists ==
List of number-one artists by total weeks at number one
Position	Artist	Weeks at No. 1
1	Janet Jackson	10
2	Whitney Houston	9
2	Mariah Carey	9
4	Snow	7
4	UB40	7
6	Meat Loaf	5
7	Silk	2
7	SWV	2
9	Peabo Bryson	1
9	Regina Belle	1

== See also ==
- 1993 in music
- List of Billboard number-one singles
- List of Billboard Hot 100 number-one singles of the 1990s

== Additional sources ==
- Fred Bronson's Billboard Book of Number 1 Hits, 5th Edition (ISBN 0-8230-7677-6)
- Joel Whitburn's Top Pop Singles 1955-2008, 12 Edition (ISBN 0-89820-180-2)
- Joel Whitburn Presents the Billboard Hot 100 Charts: The Nineties (ISBN 0-89820-137-3)
- Additional information obtained can be verified within Billboard's online archive services and print editions of the magazine.
