= Dazzey Duks =

Single by Duice

from the album Dazzey Duks
- Released: March 18, 1993
- Recorded: 1992
- Genre: Miami bass, hip hop
- Length: 4:04
- Label: Tony Mercedes, Bellmark
- Songwriters: Creo, LA Sno, Taylor Boy
- Producers: Paragon Productions, Anthony Johnson (exec.)

"Dazzey Duks" is the debut single by American Miami bass duo Duice, taken from their debut album, Dazzey Duks (1992). It was the group's only single to ever enter the mainstream music charts, making them a definitive one-hit wonder in the 1990s. It peaked at numbers 12 and 14 on the US Billboard Hot 100 and Cash Box Top 100.

== Background ==
The song was inspired by the short shorts worn by the character Daisy Duke on the CBS-TV series The Dukes of Hazzard.

== Chart performance ==
"Dazzey Duks" debuted at number 86 on the Billboard Hot 100 on January 9, 1993. Instead of rising and falling quickly, the song spent over nine months climbing the chart. It reached the top 40 in early April, entered the top 20 by mid-June, and peaked at number 12 on July 10, 1993. As well as reaching No. 16 on the Billboard Year-End Hot 100 singles of 1993. The single spend 40 weeks on the chart in total, nearly breaking the record at the time. It was certified 2× platinum on January 27, 1994, by the RIAA.

== Track listing ==
1. "Dazzey Duks" (radio version)
2. "Dazzey Duks" (instrumental)
3. "Dazzey Duks" (Megga Bass mix)
4. "Dazzey Duks" (Low Rider mix)
5. "Dazzey Duks" (Ruffhouse mix)

== Charts ==
=== Weekly charts ===
Chart (1993)	Peak position
US Billboard Hot 100	12
US Hot R&B/Hip-Hop Songs (Billboard)	19
US Rhythmic Airplay (Billboard)	10
US Dance Singles Sales (Billboard)	19
US Cash Box Top 100	14

=== Year-end charts ===
Chart (1993)	Position
US Billboard Hot 100	16

== Certifications ==
Region	Certification	Certified units/sales
United States (RIAA)	2× Platinum	2,000,000^{^}
^{‡} Sales+streaming figures based on certification alone.
