= Portrait (group) =

American vocal group

- Origin: Los Angeles, California, U.S.
- Genres: New jack swing, R&B
- Years active: 1991–1996; 2000–2005; 2018–present
- Labels: Capitol (1992–1996); Soul Japan Records (2005)
- Members: Michael Angelo Saulsberry (1991–present); Phillip Johnson (1991-1996); Ruben "R.C." Monge (2005–present)
- Past members: Eric Kirkland (1991–1996); Irving Washington III (1991–1996); Kurt Jackson (1995–1996); PJ DeMarks (2005)

Portrait is an American R&B and hip hop vocal quartet, consisting of members Michael Angelo Saulsberry, Irving Washington III, Eric Kirkland and Philip Johnson. The quartet group's music sound was influenced by the new jack swing style of the late 1980s and early 1990s.

== Career ==
The group, which hailed from Los Angeles, California debuted in 1992 with a self-titled album riding on the end of the new jack swing era. Their debut single "Here We Go Again!", which sampled Michael Jackson's Off the Wall track "I Can't Help It", reached #11 on the Billboard Hot 100 and #3 on the R&B chart in early 1993, and the second single "Honey Dip" also reached the R&B top 20.

The group was featured in an episode of Family Matters, titled "Stormy Weather", performing "Here We Go Again!". In that episode, they were performing at a high school prom, where Waldo mentions that he got them to do it because one of the members happens to be his cousin—Waldo adds that his cousin says he'll do whatever Waldo asks him to do as long as he doesn't tell people that they're related. Although Steve Urkel ends up correctly guessing which of the members is Waldo's cousin.

Throughout 1993 and 1994, Portrait could be heard lending their voices to various projects, appearing on the soundtracks to the movies, Addams Family Values and Blankman, as well as singing on the Black Men United song, "U Will Know" for the Jason's Lyric Soundtrack. Portrait also provided backing vocals on the Quincy Jones single "Slow Jams", which featured Babyface and Tamia on lead vocals, in 1995. The song reached #68 on the Billboard Hot 100.

Also in 1995, the group released their second album, All That Matters. The album had a few minor hits, with "I Can Call You" reaching #22 on the R&B charts and "How Deep Is Your Love", a cover of the Bee Gees song, briefly appearing on the Hot 100.

In 2018, the group returned as a trio consisting of Michael Angelo Saulsberry, Phillip Johnson, and new member Ruben "R.C." Monge (former lead singer of R&B band Po' Broke 'N Lonely?) with a new single entitled "In The Moment" off of their forthcoming project entitled "Beach Music" which landed them opportunities to tour in Germany and the United Kingdom respectively.

== Discography ==
=== Albums ===
Year	Album	Peak chart positions			
Year	Album	US	US R&B	AUS	NZ
1992	Portrait	70	16	100	—
1995	All That Matters	131	26	46	9
1996	Picturesque	—	—	—	—
2005	Share My Love	—	—	—	—
2020	Afro Trees	—	—	—	—

=== Compilation albums ===
Year	Album
2000	Greatest Hits

=== Singles ===
Year	Single	Peak chart positions						Certifications	Album
Year	Single	US	US R&B	AUS	FRA	GER	NZ	Certifications	Album
1992	"Here We Go Again!"	11	3	41	—	—	48		Portrait
1993	"Honey Dip"	102	18	—	—	—	—		Portrait
1993	"Day by Day"	—	42	—	—	—	—		Portrait
1994	"Be Thankful for What You've Got"	—	59	—	—	—	—		Addams Family Values: Music from the Motion Picture
1995	"I Can Call You"	119	22	—	—	—	16		All That Matters
1995	"How Deep Is Your Love"	93	51	15	24	79	1	RMNZ: Gold	All That Matters

=== Featured singles ===
Year	Single	Peak chart positions			Album
Year	Single	US	US R&B	FRA	Album
1996	"Slow Jams" (Quincy Jones featuring Babyface and Tamia with Portrait and Barry White)	68	19	—	Q's Jook Joint
1996	"Je te donne mon cœur" (Tribal Jam featuring Portrait)	—	—	30	Démarre le show
