= Duice =

American hip hop group (1992–1995)

- Origin: Augusta, Georgia, U.S.
- Genres: Hip hop, Miami bass, West Coast hip hop
- Years active: 1992–1995
- Labels: Bellmark 1992–1995; Amber
- Past members: Creo-D; L.A. Sno

Duice was an American Miami bass duo consisting of Los Angeles native Ira 'L.A. Sno' Brown and Barbados native Anthony 'Creo-D' Darlington. The two were enlisted in the military at Fort Gordon, Georgia when they were discovered. Their lone hit single, "Dazzey Duks", was an instant smash in 1993, selling over two million copies and peaking at number 12 on the Billboard Hot 100 chart. The single was certified 2× platinum on January 27, 1994, by the RIAA. Their album, Dazzey Duks, was certified gold on the same date. The song was inspired by the short shorts worn by the character Daisy Duke on the CBS TV series The Dukes of Hazzard. L.A. Sno later produced the gold certified "Whatz Up Whatz Up" along with Playa Poncho for the first So So Def Bass All Stars project. L.A. Sno also produced and co-wrote the first single for the LaFace Records Bass project entitled "And Then There Was Bass", following this with "My Baby Daddy" for B-Rock and the Biz.

== Discography ==
=== Albums ===
Title	Album details	Peak chart positions		Certifications
Title	Album details	US	US R&B	Certifications
Dazzey Duks	Released: December 22, 1992; Label: TMR, Bellmark; Format: CD, LP	84	26	RIAA: Gold

=== Singles ===
Title	Year	Peak chart positions		Certifications	Album
Title	Year	US	US R&B/HH	Certifications	Album
"Dazzey Duks"	1993	12	19	RIAA: 2× Platinum	Dazzey Duks
"Duice Is In The House!"	1993	—	—		Dazzey Duks
