= Boss (rapper) =

American rapper (1969–2024)

Bo$$

Background information
- Born: Lichelle Marie Laws; September 12, 1969; Detroit, Michigan, U.S.
- Died: March 11, 2024 (aged 54) Southfield, Michigan, U.S.
- Genre: Hip hop
- Years active: 1988–1995; 2001–2024
- Labels: Def Jam West/Chaos/Columbia/SME Records (1992–1995); 8055 Records (2004–2006)

Lichelle Marie Laws (September 12, 1969 – March 11, 2024), better known by her stage name Boss (stylized as Bo$$), was an American rapper from Detroit. Her debut album, Born Gangstaz, reached number three on Billboard's Top R&B/Hip-Hop Albums chart in 1993. Laws became best known as a part of the burgeoning West Coast gangsta rap scene in the early ’90s.

== Life and career ==
Laws was born in Detroit to Joe Laws, an accountant, and Lillie, who took her master's degree in education and was a teacher at junior high and middle schools, formerly a teacher of business education at Lewis College of Business, Detroit. Her parents were both church deacons. She had two elder sisters. Laws relocated to Los Angeles after graduating high school, accompanied by her DJ Irene 'Dee' Moore. She was spotted by DJ Quik who stuck her on a track with AMG. Russell Simmons liked the track and promptly signed her to Def Jam West. Her debut album Born Gangstaz was released in 1993, and the singles, "Deeper" and "Recipe for a Hoe", hit number one on the Billboard Hot Rap Tracks chart. On the track "Progress Of Elimination", Bo$$'s line "Yes sir master, no sir master- I'll work faster" is an homage to the rapper who influenced her style, Detroit's Derek "Chef Word" Washington. It was a frequent Chef Word bar.

In 1994, Laws was interviewed by a reporter from The Wall Street Journal, who revealed that she grew up in a middle-class neighborhood (on the West Side, Detroit), studied ballet and piano, and attended Catholic private school (where she was a cheerleader), before majoring in business for two years at Oakland University. Laws had never attempted to disguise the truth of her upbringing; the intro of her 1993 album Born Gangstaz, "Intro: A Call from Mom", has her mother Lillie describe her as "a young lady who was brought up through Catholic school for 12 years; and dance schools, tap dance, jazz, piano lessons and all of that; plus, you went to college for three years..." "The album is, in fact, bracketed with a mockery of her rearing; phone messages from mama and papa particularizing a privileged suburban upbringing (Catholic-school, piano-playing, tap-dancing)" belying the record's "unyielding vulgarity and embroidered aggression" with a "brilliant... self-mocking disclaimer". Def Jef, who produced the album and suggested the inclusion of Laws's parents, observed, "I can't believe none of the reviews saw the irony of that. No one did!" Having left Detroit for south-side Los Angeles in 1990, Laws and Moore encountered its "squalid side... derelict hotels, feudal gangs, dealing and hustling". Prior to securing a record deal, they lived in poor circumstances, selling drugs, sleeping on benches, and living in low-rent hotels. Her parents were unaware of the lifestyle she was leading. In the wake of her first album, Laws and Moore stopped working together, Laws noting, "We couldn't work together anymore, but we were still cool"; Moore's Def Jam deal never came to anything.

In the mid-1990s, Laws relocated to Texas to record songs with Ricardo Royal, a.k.a. "Coco Budda", a rapper whose work she had admired. Laws settled in Houston, entered a relationship with Royal, and had a son, Lamar. Although living a more relaxed life, Laws recorded demos for a second album, funded by Def Jam, but the label rejected them, and she was dropped from the label. Laws took this development in stride, noting, "I was used to that kind of shit... I thought I was good enough to get another deal. But I just chilled in Texas. Then I got sick." Still performing shows despite waning popularity in light of her lack of new releases, Laws moved to Dallas with Royal, where she took a job as co-host of a nightly hip-hop radio show on KKDA-FM, where she stayed for five years, recalling in 2004 "that was a bomb job". By 1999, she was suffering kidney failure; she and Royal amicably split up, and she went to live with her parents, undergoing dialysis for three and a half years, experiencing "every complication that you have with... bad kidneys", and given a poor prognosis. At times of comparatively better health, Laws recorded with Def Jef, who praised her dedication, lack of self-pity, and resolve in the face of her health problems. In 2001, she collaborated with Krayzie Bone on his album Thug On Da Line. In 2004, she released a mixtape titled The Six Million Dollar Mixtape produced by Def Jef. In 2004, Laws observed of her more recent work, "It's still hardcore... it's me. I've been through so much. I try to put a message in there, but it's not preachy shit." Def Jef claimed to have "shopped (Laws) to almost every major and indie label and met with resistance... People are always asking about how she looks, what her age is... it's never about the music. I'll work with Boss when she's 45 years old. She gave me a new perspective on women."

== Death ==
It was revealed in May 2011 that Laws was in need of a kidney due to her suffering from renal disease. Laws reached out to the Facebook community for a potential donor, but none were found. In 2017, Laws suffered from "a major stroke and seizure", and on 31 January 2021 a GoFundMe was set up to raise $15,000 for a recommended medical procedure. By February 17, the NME reported it had reached $2,215; by March 3, it had surpassed the $15,000 goal, reaching $16,314. Laws died at a hospital of kidney failure in Southfield, Michigan on March 11, 2024, at the age of 54.

== Discography ==
=== Studio albums ===
Title	Release	Peak chart positions	
Title	Release	US	US R&B
Born Gangstaz	1993	22	3

=== Mixtapes ===
- The Six Million Dollar Mixtape (2004)
- Doin Everythang with D.E.T. (2008)

=== Singles ===
Title	Release	Peak chart positions				Album
Title	Release	Hot 100	R&B	Rap	Dance	Album
"Deeper"	1993	65	28	1	25	Born Gangstaz
"Recipe of a Hoe"	1993	118^{[A]}	73	1	29	Born Gangstaz

=== Guest appearances ===
Title	Release	Other artist(s)	Album
"Mai Sista Izza Bitch"	1991	AMG	Bitch Betta Have My Money
"Don't Ring the Alarm (The Heist)"	1993	Spice 1, G-Nut	187 He Wrote
"No Peace"	1995	South Central Cartel, Ice-T, Powerlord Jel, Spice 1, Ant Banks, Treach, Dori	Murder Squad Nationwide
"A Thugga' Level"	2001	Krayzie Bone, LaReece	Thug on da Line
"Rollin' Up Some Mo'"	2001	Krayzie Bone, LaReece, Asu, K-Mont, Keef G	Thug on da Line
"Detroit Stand Up RMX'"	2006	Esham, Big Proof, Chedda Boy Malik, Big Herk, Al Nuke, Poe Whosaine	"Detroit Stand Up" single

=== Soundtrack appearances ===
Title	Release	Episode	Soundtrack
"Diary of a Mad Bitch"	1992		Zebrahead
"Run, Catch & Kill"	1994		Mi Vida Loca
"I Don't Give a Fuck"	2013	"Lesbian Request Denied"	Orange Is the New Black
"I Don't Give a Fuck"	2022	"Under Pressure"	The Man Who Fell to Earth

== Videography ==
=== Music videos ===
Title	Release	Other artist(s)	Album
"Deeper"	1993		Born Gangstaz
"Recipe of a Hoe"	1993		Born Gangstaz
"No Peace"	1995	South Central Cartel, Ice-T, Powerlord Jel, Spice 1, Ant Banks, Treach, Dori	Murder Squad Nationwide
