= Here We Go Again! (song) =

1992 song by Portrait

Single by Portrait

from the album Portrait
- Released: 1992
- Genre: New jack swing
- Length: 4:20 (album version); 3:55 (radio edit)
- Label: Capitol
- Songwriters: Andre Weston; Charles Bobbit; Eric Kirkland; Fred Wesley; James Brown; Michael Angelo Saulsbery; Phillip Johnson; Stevie Wonder; Susaye Greene; Willie Hines
- Producers: Michael Angelo Saulsbery; Eric Kirkland; Irving Washington III; Phillip Johnson

Portrait singles chronology
"Here We Go Again!" (1992)	"Honey Dip" (1993)

"Here We Go Again!" is a song by the American R&B group Portrait. It was released in 1992 as both their debut single as a group and as the lead single from their debut self-titled studio album, which was also released that year. It is a new jack swing song which samples three other songs, including "Bring the Noise" by Public Enemy, and is written about recurring arguments with a significant other. It peaked at number 11 on the Billboard Hot 100 to become the group's biggest hit and has since been included on lists of the best new jack swing songs and in an episode of the sitcom Family Matters in 1993.

== Release and composition ==
"Here We Go Again!" was released through Capitol Records in 1992 as the debut single of the Los Angeles-based R&B quartet Portrait, who wrote and produced the song, and as the lead single from their self-titled debut album. Its members at the time were singers Phillip Johnson, Eric Kirkland, Irving Washington III, and Michael Angelo Saulsbery. Its genre is new jack swing, a subgenre that melds R&B with the rhythm and sampling of hip hop. It also has jazz influences and its lyrics are about frequently arguing with an envious lover. It features samples of Chuck D's voice on the Public Enemy song "Bring the Noise", the bass line from the Michael Jackson song "I Can't Help It"—which would be used again on the De La Soul song "Breakadawn" the following year—and the hand clapping beat from "The Humpty Dance" by Digital Underground.

== Critical reception, commercial performance, and in media ==
Complex listed "Here We Go Again!" as the 19th best new jack swing song, with Brian Josephs complimenting it as "the very essence of chill". UDiscover Music included "Here We Go Again!" on their lists of the best 1990s R&B songs and the best new jack swing songs at numbers 39 and 24, respectively, and Charles Waring wrote for the latter list that "Portrait were never able to emulate the success of their playful debut single". Dave Holmes of Decider praised "Here We Go Again!" as "the best lost R&B song of the [1990s]".

"Here We Go Again!" peaked at number 11 on the Billboard Hot 100 in February 1993 and at number three on Billboard's Hot R&B Singles chart in January 1993. Andy Kellman of AllMusic deemed it the group's biggest hit. Portrait performed the song on a 1993 episode of the sitcom Family Matters in which Steve Urkel goes to prom.

== Charts ==
=== Weekly charts ===
Weekly chart performance for "Here We Go Again!"
Chart (1992–1993)	Peak position
Australia (ARIA)	41
New Zealand (Recorded Music NZ)	48
UK Singles (Official Charts)	37
US Billboard Hot 100	11
US Dance Club Songs (Billboard)	30
US Hot R&B/Hip-Hop Songs (Billboard)	3
US Rhythmic (Billboard)	1

=== Year-end charts ===
Yearly chart performance for "Here We Go Again!"
Chart (1993)	Peak position
US Billboard Hot 100	59
US Hot R&B/Hip-Hop Songs (Billboard)	22
