= Illegal (group) =

American hip hop group

- Mr. Malik (left) and Jamal

Background information
- Origin: U.S.
- Genres: East Coast hip-hop
- Years active: 1993–1995
- Labels: Rowdy; Arista
- Past members: Jamal; Mr. Malik

Illegal was an American hip hop duo composed of Jamal Phillips (Philadelphia, Pennsylvania) and Malik Edwards (Holly Hill, South Carolina) that was signed to Rowdy Records.

== History ==
The duo, known to be affiliated with the hip-hop collective Hit Squad, made their debut with the album, The Untold Truth, released in 1993, which was a minor success, peaking at No. 119 on the Billboard 200 and No. 19 on the Top R&B/Hip-Hop Albums. Several tracks on the album, including its two singles, "Head or Gut" and "We Getz Busy," were diss songs directly aimed at rivals Kris Kross and Da Youngstas. The duo virtually disappeared from the public eye until 1995, when it teamed with Too Short on the song "Thangs Change", after which the group disbanded. Jamal Phillips would later release his debut solo album, Last Chance, No Breaks, in 1995 on Rowdy Records. Malik released one single for Rowdy Records titled "Malik Goes On", but his debut album was shelved. Malik worked with Monica on Miss Thang; and later with his cousin Snoop Dogg on Doggystyle; Warren G on Regulate...G Funk Era and Take a Look Over Your Shoulder; and Tha Dogg Pound on Dogg Food and finally released his debut album in 2005, The Game Needs Me.

== Discography ==
=== Studio albums ===
| Title | Release | Peak chart positions | |
| Title | Release | US | US R&B |
|---|---|---|---|
| The Untold Truth | Released: August 24, 1993; Label: Rowdy | 119 | 19 |

=== Singles ===
| Title | Release | Peak chart positions | | | Album |
| Title | Release | US | US R&B | US Rap | Album |
|---|---|---|---|---|---|
| "Head or Gut" | 1993 | – | 24 | 1 | The Untold Truth |
| "We Getz Busy" | 1993 | 95 | 57 | 1 | The Untold Truth |
| "Back in the Day" | 1994 | – | 80 | 21 | The Untold Truth |

=== Music videos ===
| Title | Release | Director | Album |
|---|---|---|---|
| "Head or Gut" | 1993 | Derrick W. Boatner | The Untold Truth |
