= That's the Way Love Goes (Janet Jackson song) =

1993 single by Janet Jackson

Single by Janet Jackson

from the album Janet.
- B-side: "That's the Way Love Goes" (instrumental)
- Released: April 14, 1993
- Recorded: January 1993
- Studio: Flyte Tyme (Edina, Minnesota)
- Genre: R&B; pop; new jack swing; funk; trip hop
- Length: 4:24
- Label: Virgin
- Songwriters: Janet Jackson; James Harris III; Terry Lewis
- Producers: Jimmy Jam and Terry Lewis; Janet Jackson

Janet Jackson singles chronology
"The Best Things in Life Are Free" (1992)	"That's the Way Love Goes" (1993)	"If" (1993)

Music video
- "That's the Way Love Goes" on YouTube

"That's the Way Love Goes" is a song by American singer-songwriter Janet Jackson from her fifth album, Janet. (1993). The song was released in April 1993 by Virgin Records as the lead single from the Janet album. Written and produced by Jackson and Jimmy Jam and Terry Lewis, the song's themes of romantic lust saw Jackson transitioning to sensual territory, considered a shocking contrast to her previous releases among critics and the public. The song's slow tempo fused R&B, pop, funk and soul music with flourishes of hip-hop. It received positive reviews from contemporary music critics, who praised it as "iconic" and "hypnotic" for its production and vocals.

In the United States, to prevent radio leaks, Virgin Records issued a fictional release date of April 27 to pop and urban radio stations, but on April 14, two weeks before the purported release day, Virgin sent out promotional copies of the single to stations nationwide and ensured that these stations had added the song to their playlists before the day's end. Following its release, "That's the Way Love Goes" became one of the longest-reigning US hits of 1993, topping the Billboard Hot 100 for eight weeks. It also spent multiple weeks at number one on several of Billboard's other component charts and is certified platinum by the Recording Industry Association of America (RIAA). Internationally, it placed at number one in several countries, including Canada, Australia, and New Zealand.

"That's the Way Love Goes" received the Grammy Award for Best R&B Song in addition to Billboard Awards, BMI Pop Award for Most Played Song, and American Music Awards. Its accompanying music video, directed by René Elizondo Jr., received several nominations at the MTV Video Music Awards, including Best Female Video, and also influenced several videos, including releases from Ciara and Prince.

"That's the Way Love Goes" has been recorded by artists such as Bruno Mars and NSYNC, cited as an influence by Britney Spears and Nelly Furtado, and inspired or been sampled in songs by Alicia Keys, Destiny's Child and Hikaru Utada. It is considered to be one of Jackson's signature songs and is included in each of her greatest hits collections: Design of a Decade: 1986–1996 (1995), Number Ones (2009) and Icon: Number Ones (2010).

== Background ==
In 1991, Jackson fulfilled her contract with A&M Records, signing a multimillion-dollar contract with Virgin Records estimated between 32 and 50 million dollars, making her the highest-paid recording artist at the time. The first version of "That's the Way Love Goes" had a lovelorn tone which Jackson revised, contacting producer Jimmy Jam to say she was taking an alternate direction. Jackson was initially indifferent upon hearing its instrumental, prompting her to request a tape to listen to as she embarked on a brief vacation. Upon returning, Jackson replied "You know that track you did? I love it. It's absolutely the bomb," adding "I wasn't hearing it, but now I totally hear it. We've gotta do that track! Oh my God, we played it non-stop!" Jackson wished to write and record the song immediately, and quickly devised its title.

Jam commented that "That's the Way Love Goes" was the perfect introduction into what the album was going to be. At one point in the recording in December 1992, they took a two-week break for the Christmas holidays and Jackson went to Anguilla. She asked Jam to make a cassette of tracks they were already working on to take with her on the trip. Two weeks later in January 1993, she was excited about the track, requesting that her producers put the track on the album and explaining that she played it non-stop while she was traveling. The producer recalled, "At about one in the morning, the intercom went off in my bedroom. She goes, 'Jimmy? Are you awake?' I said, 'I am now'. She said, 'I've got the concept. It's going to be called 'That's the Way Love Goes'.' Throughout the whole project, it was our favourite record. [...] there was something about that song that we just thought was so different and really captured that part of her life". In retrospect, Jackson called the song "relaxed and carefree", being "easy and fun, soft and seductive". When Virgin heads went to Minneapolis, Jackson and her producers played a rough cut of "If" for them. The executives felt it would be the first release from the album, and Jackson shared this feeling. However, Jam and Lewis, still wanted the label to release "That's the Way Love Goes" first. Jam recalled,

"Janet goes, 'Yeah, you're right!' Then she comes back a week later and says, 'Well… guys, it looks like 'If' is going to be the single. The record label feels it could have a great dance video...' So we were finishing up recording later with Chuck D and we played him and [hip-hop producer] Hank Shocklee the two songs. They said, 'If. That's like Janet saying I'm back!' So Janet's looking at us like 'See? See!?' And then he (Chuck) goes, 'But that other song… you know when Sade releases a record and it's not like a bunch of hype? She just slips it out there and you say, 'Oh my God listen to this!?' It introduces itself". And we're looking at Janet like, 'See!?'"

== Composition ==
"That's the Way Love Goes"
Jackson transitions to sensual territory and a new style with the single, boasting elements of pop, soul, hip-hop, and funk.

"That's the Way Love Goes" samples James Brown's 1974 song "Papa Don't Take No Mess" and the Honey Drippers' 1973 song "Impeach the President". It is set in common time, in the key of G minor. Jackson's vocal chords range between the tonal nodes of high-tone F_{3} to low-tone Bb_{4}. The song is in a medium tempo of 100 beats per minute with a repeating chord progression of EbMaj7–F6–Gm. Sal Cinquemani from Slant Magazine noted its "measured hip-hop loop and titular one-line hook". Patricia Smith of The Boston Globe also noted that the chorus of the song consists of a simple line, "deep male voice weaves its way through the chorus, and Janet experiments with the layering of spoken lines, chanting the title like a mantra". J.D. Considine of The Baltimore Sun noted that Jackson performed the vocals in the composition at the lower end of her vocal register, "coaxing a velvety warmth" that perfectly complements the lyrics.

The composition begins with the "seemingly innocent" phrases such as "You'll be so glad you came", and goes on to more adult lyrics. Shayne Lee in her book Erotic Revolutionaries: Black Women, Sexuality, and Popular Culture (2010), while noting the whole erotic lyrics singer, wrote: "In 'That's the Way Love Goes' she promises to take her man to places he's never been. She urges him to reach out and feel her body; slow down because he's got her there all night; to go deeper, and that feels so good she's going to cry". The Crisis magazine wrote that Jackson has long been famous for her "self-conscious image of a good girl", but changed her lyrics' style. "Just listen to the spicy lyrics of her super-hit 'That's the Way Love Goes' and you will realize that she is no longer that cute little girl from the Good Times show".

== Critical reception ==
"That's the Way Love Goes" was well received by contemporary music critics, praised for its sonic innovation and departure, evolving to an edgier and sensual style. Patrick Corcoran from Albumism stated that it is "a song that is greater than the sum of its parts." He added, "Its mid-tempo, James Brown and The Honey Drippers sampling groove manages to go hard and stay cool at the same time, while Janet's delicately wanton vocal and lyrics drip with sensuality." Alex Henderson of AllMusic qualified it as both "sultry" and "hypnotic". The song was considered one of several which displayed how Jackson "blossomed into a beautiful young woman," described as "a slow burn of a groove led by her sensual whisper," complete with "slinky guitars" revealing a hidden side of her persona. Andrew Hampp from Billboard magazine said the song is an adult affair in comparison to Jackson's prior releases, saying "Janet leaves the flirting to the kids and instead lets her guard down for her lover ("Come closer baby closer / reach out and feel my body.")" Another Billboard editor, Larry Flick called it "a gorgeous midtempo jam fueled by warm classic funk and soul instrumental colors. Romantic, almost poetic lyrics, and an instantly memorable chorus are given depth by Jackson's caressing, whispery vocal and fluid guitar lines."

David Browne of Entertainment Weekly described it as "gently percolating pop" and "easygoing", with another critique stating "the sexy lyrical composition blends well with the seductively arranged harmony of the song." Bjørg Tulinius from Danish magazine Gaffa picked the song as one of "the best numbers" of the album, describing it as "soul-imprinted". Robert Hilburn from Los Angeles Times described "That's the Way Love Goes" as "one of the most endearing pieces of romantic pop confection of the '90s", adding "the song is a highlight of Jackson's latest and best album, "janet.," a "silky collection" exploring "questions of sexual awakening and desire with a classy sense of pop craft and convincing passion." The publication also stated "Summer pop doesn't get any smoother or more seductive," likening its quality as unheard for several decades, adding "You might have to go all the way back to Smokey Robinson and the Miracles or, even, the Drifters to find summer pop as silky and as inviting as this." Editor Maureen Sajbel considered it a "gentle love ballad". MTV considered it "sultry, slow-burning". Pan-European magazine Music & Media commented that "romance is back, and so is Janet, who writes the handbook of love on a beat similar to Charles & Eddie's Would I Lie To You. Exploring the borders between jazz dance and swing beat, Jackson is breathing sensuality."

Alan Jones from Music Week deemed it an "insidious cool tempo Jam/Lewis track [that] weaves an intricate melody, at once maddeningly commercial and yet unbelievably delicate." Glenn Gamboa of Newsday declared "After two straight smash albums and a dozen immediate hits, Jackson takes a left turn," ultimately "focusing on vibe and groove and making the most of her voice." Jan DeKnock from Orlando Sentinel labeled it an "appealing midtempo number" with Jackson's vocals performed in a "lilt" technique. Touré from Rolling Stone described the song as a "warm bed of soul sounds." The publication praised Jackson's approach to sexuality, writing "Jackson evades reductive sexuality by demanding love and respect from both her partner and herself. She wants you to touch her, and love's got to do with it because "that's the way love goes." Janet won't stand for a trade-off — she wants love and sex." Sean Fennessey from Vibe called it "cool, sensual, simple." Richard Harrington from The Washington Post labeled it as "supple" and "sensual". An additional review stated "That's the Way Love Goes" and the janet. album "shattered any illusions the public still held that Janet remained a little girl. Filled with sexual desires and adult fantasies, Janet broke boundaries but still managed to channel her desires into chart-topping hits."

== Chart performance ==
"That's the Way Love Goes" entered the US Billboard Hot 100 at number 14. Two weeks later, it became Jackson's sixth number-one single on the Hot 100, eleventh number-one single on the Hot R&B Singles chart, and ninth number-one single on the Dance Club Play chart. At the time of its release, the song's three week trek to the top made it the second-fastest rising single in Hot 100 history, behind the Beatles' "Can't Buy Me Love". The single spent four weeks atop the Hot R&B Singles chart and Maxi-Singles Sales charts. To date, the song is Jackson's longest hit in the United States, and was also the seventeenth biggest hit of the 1990s. Six years after its release, Billboard ranked the song as the thirtieth biggest pop hit of the past forty-five years, and in 2007, ranked it as the nineteenth biggest hit ever by a female solo artist.

The song is among eight songs to reach the top ten of the Mainstream/Top 40 chart within two weeks of its release and is the longest-reigning number one hit among them, staying atop the chart for ten weeks. Jackson is one of the few artists with a minimum of ten top-ten hits on the Top 40/Rhythm-Crossover chart, with "That's the Way Love Goes" being her first appearance and number one on the chart. The single was certified gold by the RIAA on November 12, 1993, and later certified platinum. It sold over 1.1 million copies domestically.

Internationally, "That's the Way Love Goes" reached number one in Australia, Canada, and New Zealand, as well as on the Eurochart Hot 100 and the UK R&B Singles Chart. The song peaked at number two on the main UK Singles Chart (Jackson's highest-charting single in the country alongside " The Best Things in Life Are Free"), charted within the top five in Finland and the Netherlands, and entered the top ten in Denmark, Germany, Ireland, and Sweden. In New Zealand, it became the first single by a female artist to debut at number one. The single is certified platinum in Australia and silver in the United Kingdom.

== Music video ==
The music video for "That's the Way Love Goes" was directed by René Elizondo Jr. in March 1993. Set in a loft, Jackson is depicted amongst friends and is persuaded to play her new single. Jackson plays the song, briefly interrupted by a dancer who pauses it to express her approval. The song resumes while Jackson and company begin to dance, ending with Jackson talking and joking amongst her dancers. The video was choreographed by Tina Landon. To build anticipation, a promotional advertisement was aired on music channels for several weeks prior to the video's premiere, depicting Jackson narrating and introducing her dancers from behind a camera lens.

The video is widely regarded as an early and influential depiction of Jackson's more sensual, adult image, marking a departure from the militaristic aesthetic of her earlier work. The shift had been introduced shortly beforehand with the video for "Love Will Never Do (Without You)," which emphasized a more relaxed, body-conscious aesthetic. "That's the Way Love Goes" was nominated for Best Dance Video, Best Choreography, and Best Female Video at the MTV Video Music Awards. The video is featured on the Janet and Design of a Decade video compilations, special edition of All for You, and From Janet to Damita Jo: The Videos. Behind the scenes footage of its filming was also released. An alternate "One Take Version" focusing solely on Jackson appears exclusively on the Janet video compilation.

The video features a then unknown Jennifer Lopez, who appears as a backing dancer and has a spoken line in the video's opening dialogue. Lopez credits Jackson as her inspiration to enter the entertainment industry, saying "When I saw the 'Pleasure Principle' video it inspired me to get into this business," and "I can also never forget the magnificent Janet Jackson as she is a big inspiration for all my dance and music videos."

=== Reception ===
Jackson dancing sensually in the "That's the Way Love Goes" video, the clip being her first public appearance after being absent for few years.

Jackson's previous video "Love Will Never Do (Without You)" was the "first inkling" of the contrasted image developed with the release of the Janet album and "That's the Way Love Goes." The transition is regarded as iconic and commended by many critics. Maureen Sajbel of The LA Times stated Jackson abandoned "the masculine clothes," becoming "refined and softened to a model-perfect feminine image." Sajbel wrote "Jackson's svelte figure is poured into black bell-bottoms and crop tops. She wears silver hoop earrings and wide cream and silver chokers that have sent adolescents streaming into stores asking for "Janet Jackson necklaces." Entertainment Weekly declared it Jackson's earliest foray into being "not just a cherubic pop star but a confident, self-sufficient, and sexy grown-up," calling the "slinky, body-revealing" video "the first volley."

PopMatters commended its choreography as "sinuous seduction" and praised its concept, saying "the video for "That's the Way Love Goes" once again showcases Janet and her friends, but this time the portrait is much more sensual and relaxed. When this video was released, Janet had been out of the public eye for several years. The video gave hungry fans a fresh eyeful of a radiant, sexy-looking Janet, murmuring a tribute to the joys of physical love." Idolator also applauded Jackson's evolution, exclaiming "Ms. Jackson had finally shed her bulky "Rhythm Nation" uniform in exchange for a midriff baring top and a choker, long before anyone would associate her name with the words "wardrobe malfunction" [see Super Bowl XXXVIII halftime show controversy]". The clip was thought to be "the most accessible version of the star the public had ever seen."

Foster Kamer of Complex declared it a "really simple formula" and "decidedly lo-fi" in comparison to Jackson's "high-tech repertoire." Described as "just a bunch of ladies, kicking it in Janet's loft, dancing around to music", the clip was praised as "all at once golden" for Jackson's "power of seemingly limitless charisma, especially when metered out and not unleashed full-force." The publication concluded "And yet: Janet oozes sexuality as she dances with the ladies around the apartment, leaning on walls, looking up at the ceiling, possibly thinking thoughts about her then-husband René Elizondo Jr." Robert Christgau considered it among Jackson's videos which displayed "a gender equality that's almost progressive by video's pitiful male-chauvinist standards" due to Jackson's dominance over her male counterparts, in which two male dancers compete for her and seven female dancer's attention. The LA Times stated the clip's premise of "Jackson lounging with her pals" succeeds at "seeming offhandedly sexy in a very shrewd way." MusicOMH considered it "a sultry start" into Jackson's new image, with Jackson seen dancing "up against a pillar." Feminist website Jezebel considered Jackson "loud, fierce and mouthy" in the video, in contrast to Jackson's "usually so soft-spoken" persona. The New York Times observed "the bump" dance to resurface among youth and clubs "now that Janet Jackson does it in her new video."

== Live performances ==
Jackson performed a medley of "That's the Way Love Goes" and "If" at the MTV Video Music Awards. The song was performed along with "Because of Love" on MTV's New Year's Eve special. It was also performed on Top of the Pops and French entertainment show Les Années Tubes. Jackson later performed the song on The Ellen DeGeneres Show during promotion for 20 Y.O. and Good Morning America upon the release of her tenth album Discipline. It has been performed on each of her following tours, including the janet. Tour, The Velvet Rope Tour, All for You Tour, Rock Witchu Tour, Number Ones: Up Close and Personal, Unbreakable World Tour, and State of the World Tour with elements of Rock the Boat by Aaliyah. It is also included in her 2019 Las Vegas Residency Janet Jackson: Metamorphosis. Jackson included the song on her 2023 Together Again Tour.

Jackson's performance medley at the MTV Video Music Awards is often regarded among the most infamous and intricate performances of her career. Complex included it among "The 25 Sexiest Moments in VMA History," commenting "when Britney and Christina were busy dealing with midterms and acne, Janet Jackson was the queen of bringing sexy to the VMA stage. Though it'd no doubt be considered tame by today's standards, Janet's exposed stomach and bra made for the hottest performance of the year." Another critique found it "on point, going from sexy to high energy and intricacy," considered "easily one of her best performances, and one that most pop chicks should study." Queerty titled it the second best performance in the show's history, commending its "dance break by which all dance breaks will be forever judged." It was introduced by actor Christian Slater, who declared Jackson to have "the sexiest bellybutton I've ever seen." A studio version appears on the limited-edition version of janet., while remixes entitled the "CJ FXTC Club Mix" and "CJ FXTC Bass Hit Dub" appear on janet. Remixed.

The song's performance on the janet. World Tour was regarded among its "most affecting moments" as Jackson "returned for the encore in just a flannel shirt and jeans." On Number Ones, Up Close and Personal, a review stated "In fact, the more blissful the hook, the tighter she wrapped the song around her - somehow squeezing the breezy sensuality out of "That's the Way Love Goes" without suffocating it."

== Awards and nominations ==
"That's the Way Love Goes" received various awards including the Grammy Award for Best R&B Song, the Billboard Award for Top R&B Single; Airplay, and the award for Favorite Soul/R&B Single at the American Music Awards.

List of accolades for "That's the Way Love Goes"

Year	Award	Nominated work	Result
1993	Billboard Awards	Top R&B Single; Airplay	Won
1993	Billboard Awards	Top Hot 100 Single of the Year	Nominated
1993	BMI Pop Awards	Most Played Song	Won
1993	Grammy Awards	Best R&B Song	Won
1993	Grammy Awards	Best Female R&B Vocal Performance	Nominated
1993	MTV Video Music Awards	Best Female Video	Nominated
1993	MTV Video Music Awards	Best Dance Video	Nominated
1993	MTV Video Music Awards	Best Choreography	Nominated
1993	Soul Train Music Awards	Single of the Year; Female	Won
1993	Soul Train Music Awards	Song of the Year	Nominated
1994	American Music Awards	Favorite Soul/R&B Single	Won
2008	VH1	Top 100 Love Songs (#52)	—N/a
2009	Blender	500 Greatest Songs Since You Were Born (#427)	—N/a
2012	VH1	40 Greatest Songs of the '90s (#4)	—N/a
2013	Complex	50 Best Videos of the '90s (#9)	—N/a

== Legacy and impact ==
"That's the Way Love Goes" is among Jackson's signature songs, recognized for its vocals, innovation, and "timeless" aura. It was considered an alternative to popular radio trends and essential part of Jackson's artistic growth, signifying a massive shift in her music and image. It has been cited as an inspiration by Britney Spears, Alicia Keys, Nelly Furtado, and Destiny's Child. The song is ranked among Blender's "500 Greatest Songs Since You Were Born," placing at number four in VH1's "Greatest Songs of the '90s" in 2012. Billboard praised its structure and longevity, saying "That indelible refrain: "Like a moth to a flame / burned by the fire / my love is blind / can't you see my desire?" That slinky Jam & Lewis beat. Even at 20 years old, this Janet jam can still ignite any house party, much like the one in its music video." The publication exclaimed it to be "a sexual awakening for both Jackson and American culture"; classified as one of "the most sexually frank to reach the upper reaches of the charts at the time."

The L.A. Times considered it "one of the most endearing pieces of romantic pop confection of the '90s," as well as "the most seductive slice of daydream romanticism in years." GuidetoGay called it "equally sexy" as her image, "but unlike Madonna's 'Erotica', 'janet.' left more to the imagination." "While most expected her to return with an in-your-face dance track, Jackson "eased in the side door" with a more soulful groove. The music video was equally laid back, showing Jackson chilling with her dancers - one of whom was a then unknown Jennifer Lopez." CNN stated the song memorably "set the mood for a sultry summer," while Vulture.com recalled it "slinked its way easily onto summer mix tapes". Additionally, it was declared "the epitome of bedroom slow-jams," among the album's "several iconic hits" which helped define the decade. Newsday considered "That's the Way Love Goes" among Jackson's singles which "changed the course of pop," applauding the "all-purpose, feel-good hit," saying "unlike most summer anthems, "That's the Way Love Goes" doesn't have a gimmick. It's just straight-up cool. [...] It got heads bobbin' in countless cars. It filled dance floors with folks finger- pointing along with the chorus. It became an essential part of the soundtrack to barbecues and beach parties. With its laid-back beat and Jackson's sultry- sweet vocals, it doesn't get you excited as much as puts a smile on your face, which may explain why it was never grating despite its omnipresence." Gold Stripe Magazine stated "When we think of the 90s, we think of baggy boyfriend jeans, crop tops, big hair, and house parties. Janet Jackson was one woman who defined the decade. On the scene, she was the total package: sexy, talented, and a softspoken sweetheart."

"This song is all about the audacity of chill — it bumped its way into pop culture 19 years ago to launch Janet's fifth album ... janet. Instead of hitting us in the face with any of the album's many uptempos, Jan, Jam and Lewis teased the set with the relaxed hip-hop soul of "That's the Way Love Goes." The album it comes from was all about her sexual blossoming, and here's where the petals started to move. The song relies on deceptively gripping hooks (earworms are never chill and this is crawling with them) and exploits Janet's musical muttering [possibly] better than anything before or since. For not demanding too much and letting her just ooze, this song resulted in the vocal performance of the woman's career."

— Gawker on "That's the Way Love Goes"

Slant Magazine praised it as a "subtler alternative" to radio trends by artists such as Mariah Carey and Boyz II Men, adding "with its measured hip-hop loop and titular one-line hook, the song was sleek, smart, and sexy—everything you didn't expect from the lead single from a Janet album." Furthermore, an anecdote stated "this song smashed records worldwide, and heralded the arrival of a grown woman comfortable with her own sexuality. Fans and music lovers were left gaping in awe as Janet shed away her military style outfits and did away with her tomboy looks, resurfacing as a strong confidant woman and a global pop icon with the release of her 1993 iconic album Janet., which went on to produce 6 consecutive top 10 hits including 2 # 1 singles, and pushed her ahead of her contemporaries Madonna and Whitney Houston." Several critics applauded the song's opening refrain as "seductive," "memorable," and "hypnotic", with a particular review exclaiming "Janet makes it read like poetry." The analysis continued "realistically, no one had any reason to think she was sexy enough to pull it off. Where Janet used to hint at getting it in, she now openly admitted to wanting it without hesitation; "Go deeper baby, deeper...you feel so good I wanna cry." At 25, it made sense for her to give up the coyness of her earlier years. But, who knew she'd pull it off quite so well?" Heidi-Siegmund Cuda of The New York Times declared the song to have a profound effect in clubs, saying "love was in the air, as couples lapped it up and slinked along to the beat." An additional anecdote stated it "featured a sexy video and just a groove and beat that you just can help but fall in love with. The sultry vocals of Janet Jackson and that hypnotic groove ceases to get old." Soul Train called its era "all about Ms. Janet Jackson," saying the song "reigns supreme in the warm weather months," adding "that sultry, silky voice that Jackson brings to the table, combined with hot, sexy lyrics made this song one of the year's best." The video was heralded as "all kinds of fly and fashion forward."

Rich Juzwiak of Gawker calls "That's the Way Love Goes" a "classic" that "everyone's heard a million times," asking "Have you listened to this song lately? Like, really listened to it, not just took it for granted as the pop wallpaper that megahits can become over time? It's worth it." Juzwiak applauded its "hypnotic" tempo and vocals, noting the pivotal role the song and its video played in Jackson's career evolution. An additional evaluation called its release "strategic timing," commending Jackson's attempt to "urge the label to go with something that was romantic, grown and laid-back" rather than leading "with a big dance record", declaring it "at a minimum, a genius move." Jackson's "broad appeal" allowed the song to thrive on pop, urban, and adult contemporary formats, adding "It still sounds fresh to this day, and I'd be willing to bet that people who aren't even die-hard Janet fans have always been in love with this single." BuzzFeed ranked its music video as Jackson's fourth best, praising its "house party" theme. The clip aided Jackson in becoming known for her trademark abs. It also set fashion trends among youth, described to have "sent adolescents streaming into stores asking for "Janet Jackson necklaces".

== Influence ==
Various artists have been inspired by the song's production, aura, and opening segment, as well as the music video's "laid back" dance environment. It has been covered by artists such as Bruno Mars and 'N Sync. Britney Spears cited "That's the Way Love Goes" as the inspiration for "Touch of My Hand", appearing on Spears' fourth album In the Zone, saying "I like to compare it to 'That's the Way Love Goes,' kind of a Janet Jackson thing." Additionally, MuuMuse likened the spoken word introduction of Spears' "Am I A Sinner" to a similar opening segment in Jackson's song. Spears included "That's the Way Love Goes" in a playlist for Z100's Reality Radio, commenting "This is one of my favorite songs ever. I love this girl. She has the coolest abs in the world." The whispered introduction in the "Bluelight Version" of Alicia Keys' "Girl on Fire" references the opening refrain of "That's the Way Love Goes". A lyric comparable to the song's introduction was noted in Madonna's "Turn Up the Radio," with similar opening lines also used in Wynter Gordon's "Stimela" and Jennifer Lopez's "Step Into My World."

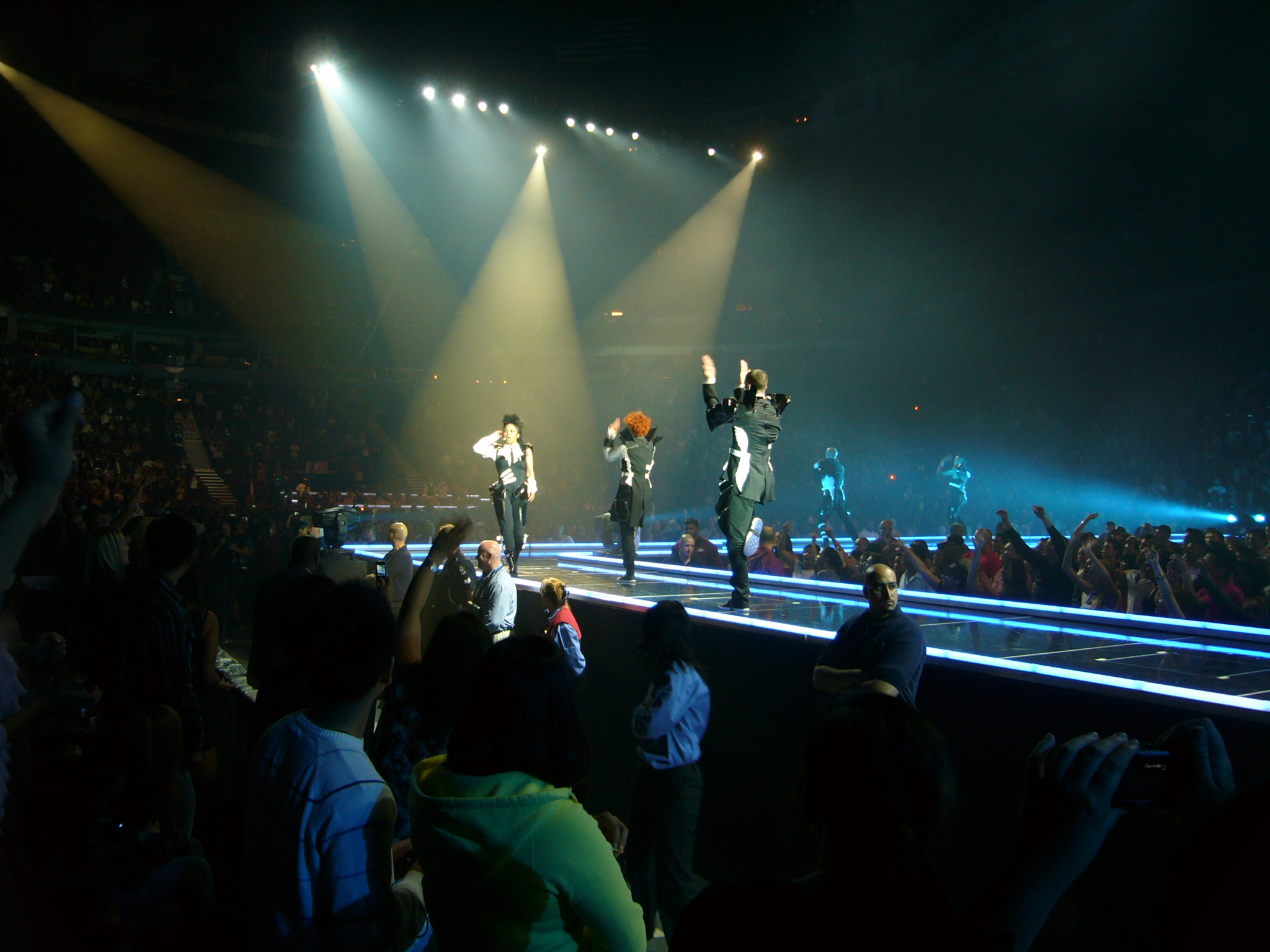
Jackson performing on the Rock Witchu Tour.

Destiny's Child's "Nuclear", a Neptunes production included on the compilation Love Songs, was likened to an "early '90s, "That's The Way Love Goes"-style Janet Jackson mold" for its "sampled beat recalling the best of '90s hip-pop," also compared for its "mellow, soothing lyrics over churning hip-hop beats." Nelly Furtado cited Jackson as the inspiration for the transition displayed with her third album Loose, saying "Janet Jackson came out with "That's the Way Love Goes," and she was comfortable in her sexuality and womanhood, and that was inspiring to me." Pitchfork likened Ciara's "This is What Love Is", appearing on the album Basic Instinct, to "a trance-inspired take on the breathy spoken word of Janet Jackson's vastly superior "That's the Way Love Goes". Kat DeLuna stated "This song made me want to pursue music!" Yahoo! Music considered Mariah Carey and Miguel's "#Beautiful" "one of the most appealing summer jams since Janet Jackson's "That's The Way Love Goes". Jackson has evoked the song's feel in several recordings, with People Magazine describing several cuts on Damita Jo reminiscent of its "lush sensual rush". "Feels So Right" from All for You was likened to the song for its mellow feel.

Several subsequent music videos or albums have drawn influence from the video's intimate party setting. BuzzFeed likened the overall feel of Jhené Aiko's debut EP Sail Out to the "kickback" ambiance of the "That's the Way Love Goes" video, "but while sitting in clouds of smoke rather than dancing." Scenes in Ciara's "Body Party" video were influenced by the video's "laid-back" setting as well as Jackson's "Go Deep". Ciara's performance at the 2013 BET Awards was thought to be inspired by Jackson's performance of the song at the MTV Video Music Awards. The opening setting of Ciara's "Never Ever," which featured Young Jeezy, was also observed to be similar. The setting, choreography, and wardrobe worn by lead dancer Danielle Curiel in Prince's "Breakfast Can Wait" video were observed to have a similar feel to Jackson's "That's the Way Love Goes" and "If" videos. Curiel commented "After "Breakfast Can Wait" came out everyone said it reminded them of those videos, so I went and watched them on YouTube I could definitely see the similarities." The "throw back" style of Toni Braxton's "Make My Heart" video was described as reminiscent of the clip. Jessi Malay cited Jackson's "confident, sexy" and "in control" image in the video as an influence, saying "Janet is a female artist who has gotten the message out that you can be a commanding woman without losing your femininity and sexuality."

Critics have observed elements similar to the video's somber vibe and infamous setting in several films and television series. A golden-hued setting from the film Spartacus: Vengeance was compared to the video by Logo's The Backlot. The locale in an episode of American Horror Story: Coven titled "Fried Chicks" was likened to the video, with Vulture.com saying "Fiona is having her hair done on the set of "That's the Way Love Goes"." Jackson's black ensemble during this period were prominent influences in fashion. In 2011, Elle Magazine described a Catherine Malandrino black dress as reminiscent of Jackson's outfit worn in the clip.

== Covers and samples ==
American singer Bruno Mars performed a live cover of "That's the Way Love Goes" at the Chelsea Theater in Las Vegas in January 2014. Mars previously covered the song while performing at the Playboy Mansion two years prior. British producer MNEK released a cover of "That's the Way Love Goes" in April 2013, saying "Janet Jackson is just the queen, and it requires no debate. All rights go to Janet, Jam + Lewis and anyone else who was involved. whoever [else] is probably irrelevant simply cos Janet Jackson, and Jam + Lewis are just better than everything and everyone. That's all." The cover reconstructs the song using Jackson's vocals in addition to his own.

Cle Wootton performed the song on the first season of Australian Idol. American boy band 'N Sync covered "That's the Way Love Goes" and released a promotional music video for the song, aired on Jackson's MTV Icon special. Singer Nina covered the song for the soundtrack of the film What's the Worst That Could Happen?. Japanese-American pop singer Hikaru Utada sampled a brief section of the song during the chorus and closing of the "Underwater Mix" of "Addicted to You". Yuliet Topaz released a lounge cover of the song in 2008. Deborah Cox, Brownstone, Chantay Savage, and Heavy D performed "That's the Way Love Goes" at the Soul Train Music Awards to tribute Jackson.

Drum and bass artist Wriggler Bascombe sampled Jackson's vocals in "Burn by the Fire." Italian house producer Nicholas sampled the song for "The Way" in 2010. Saxophonist Kirk Whalum covered the song for the album For You. Jazz musician Norman Brown covered the song and released it as the first single from his sophomore album After the Storm. Alexander Ethan Gray also covered the song, which appeared on the tribute album Smooth Sax Tribute to Janet Jackson.

== Track listing and formats ==
- UK CD single and German CD maxi single
1. "That's the Way Love Goes" (CJ R&B 7-inch mix) – 4:10
2. "That's the Way Love Goes" (That's the Remix (We Aimsta Win)) – 5:14
3. "That's the Way Love Goes" (LP version) – 4:24
4. "That's the Way Love Goes" (instrumental) – 4:24
- Dutch CD maxi single
1. "That's the Way Love Goes" (LP version) – 4:24
2. "That's the Way Love Goes" (CJ R&B 7-inch mix) – 4:10
3. "That's the Way Love Goes" (CJ R&B 12-inch mix) – 6:16
4. "That's the Way Love Goes" (CJ FXTC club mix 12-inch) – 6:23
5. "That's the Way Love Goes" (Macapella) – 6:22
6. "That's the Way Love Goes" (CJ FXTC instrumental) – 6:14
- UK 12-inch single
1. "That's the Way Love Goes" (CJ R&B 12-inch mix) – 6:16
2. "That's the Way Love Goes" (LP version) – 4:24
3. "That's the Way Love Goes" (Macapella) – 6:22
4. "That's the Way Love Goes" (CJ FXTC club mix 12-inch) – 6:23
5. "That's the Way Love Goes" (CJ FXTC dub) – 6:14
6. "That's the Way Love Goes" (CJ FXTC instrumental) – 6:14
- US 12-inch single
1. "That's the Way Love Goes" (CJ R&B 12-inch mix) – 6:16
2. "That's the Way Love Goes" (LP version) – 4:24
3. "That's the Way Love Goes" (CJ FXTC club mix 12-inch) – 6:23
4. "That's the Way Love Goes" (CJ FXTC dub) – 6:14
- US CD maxi single
1. "That's the Way Love Goes" (CJ R&B 7-inch mix) – 4:10
2. "That's the Way Love Goes" (CJ R&B 12-inch mix) – 6:16
3. "That's the Way Love Goes" (CJ FXTC Club Mix 12-inch) – 6:23
4. "That's the Way Love Goes" (Macapella) – 6:22
5. "That's the Way Love Goes" (CJ FXTC instrumental) – 6:14
6. "That's the Way Love Goes" (LP version) – 4:24
- International 7-inch / cassette / CD single
1. "That's the Way Love Goes" (LP version) – 4:24
2. "That's the Way Love Goes" (instrumental) – 4:24

== Charts ==
=== Weekly charts ===
Chart (1993)	Peak position
Australia (ARIA)	1
Austria (Ö3 Austria Top 40)	13
Belgium (Ultratop 50 Flanders)	12
Canada Contemporary Hit Radio (The Record)	1
Canada Retail Singles (The Record)	1
Canada Top Singles (RPM)	1
Canada Adult Contemporary (RPM)	10
Canada Dance/Urban (RPM)	2
Denmark (IFPI)	9
Europe (Eurochart Hot 100)	7
Europe (European Dance Radio)	1
Europe (European Hit Radio)	1
Finland (Suomen virallinen lista)	3
France (SNEP)	15
Germany (GfK)	9
Greece (Pop + Rock)	1
Iceland (Íslenski Listinn Topp 40)	20
Ireland (IRMA)	8
Netherlands (Dutch Top 40)	4
Netherlands (Single Top 100)	7
New Zealand (Recorded Music NZ)	1
Sweden (Sverigetopplistan)	4
Switzerland (Schweizer Hitparade)	11
UK Singles (Official Charts)	2
UK Airplay (Music Week)	1
UK Dance (Music Week)	1
UK Club Chart (Music Week)	3
US Billboard Hot 100	1
US Adult Contemporary (Billboard)	16
US Dance Club Songs (Billboard)	1
US Dance Singles Sales (Billboard)	1
US Hot R&B/Hip-Hop Songs (Billboard)	1
US Pop Airplay (Billboard)	1
US Rhythmic Airplay (Billboard)	1
US Cash Box Top 100	1
US Adult Contemporary (Radio & Records)	17
US Contemporary Hit Radio (Radio & Records)	1
US Urban (Radio & Records)	1

=== Year-end charts ===
Chart (1993)	Position
Australia (ARIA)	17
Belgium (Ultratop)	52
Canada Retail Singles (The Record)	1
Canada Top Singles (RPM)	3
Canada Adult Contemporary (RPM)	67
Canada Dance/Urban (RPM)	16
Europe (Eurochart Hot 100)	41
Europe (European Dance Radio)	3
Europe (European Hit Radio)	4
Germany (Media Control)	39
Netherlands (Dutch Top 40)	20
Netherlands (Single Top 100)	42
New Zealand (RIANZ)	11
Sweden (Topplistan)	57
Switzerland (Schweizer Hitparade)	32
UK Singles (OCC)	43
UK Airplay (Music Week)	24
US Billboard Hot 100	4
US Dance Club Play (Billboard)	28
US Hot R&B Singles (Billboard)	3
US Maxi-Singles Sales (Billboard)	15
US Cash Box Top 100	4
US Contemporary Hit Radio (Radio & Records)	2
US Urban (Radio & Records)	14

=== Decade-end charts ===
Chart (1990–1999)	Position
Canada (Nielsen SoundScan)	27
US Billboard Hot 100	17

== Certifications ==
Region	Certification	Certified units/sales
Australia (ARIA)	Platinum	70,000^{^}
New Zealand (RMNZ)	Gold	5,000^{*}
New Zealand (RMNZ) digital	Platinum	30,000^{‡}
United Kingdom (BPI)	Silver	214,000
United States (RIAA)	2× Platinum	2,000,000^{‡}
^{*} Sales figures based on certification alone.^{^} Shipments figures based on certification alone.^{‡} Sales+streaming figures based on certification alone.

== Release history ==
Region	Date	Format(s)	Label(s)	Ref.
United States	April 14, 1993	Pop; urban radio	Virgin	
United Kingdom	April 26, 1993	7-inch vinyl; 12-inch vinyl; CD; cassette	Virgin	
Japan	April 28, 1993	Mini-CD	Virgin	
Australia	May 3, 1993	CD; cassette	Virgin	

== See also ==
- List of European number-one airplay songs of the 1990s
- List of Hot 100 number-one singles of 1993 (U.S.)
- List of Mainstream Top 40 number-one hits of 1993 (U.S.)
- R&B number-one hits of 1993 (USA)
- List of number-one singles in Australia during the 1990s
- List of number-one singles in 1993 (New Zealand)
- List of number-one dance singles of 1993 (U.S.)
