= Ditty (song) =

Single by Paperboy

from the album The Nine Yards
- Released: November 3, 1992
- Genre: Hip hop
- Length: 4:03
- Label: Next Plateau
- Songwriters: Mitchell Johnson; Aaron Clark; Dave Ferguson; John Ferguson; Roger Troutman; Larry Troutman
- Producer: David Weldon

Paperboy singles chronology
"Ditty" (1992)	"Bumpin' (Adaptation of Humpin')" (1993)

"Ditty" is a song by American rapper Paperboy from his debut studio album, The Nine Yards (1993). It is the opening track on the album and was issued as the album's lead single. The song is primarily based around a sample of Zapp's "Doo Wa Ditty (Blow That Thing)", but it also contains a sample of James Brown's "Funky President (People It's Bad)".

"Ditty" is Paperboy's only song to chart on the Billboard Hot 100, peaking at No. 10 in 1993. It was awarded a platinum certification from the Recording Industry Association of America. In 1994, the song was nominated for a Grammy Award for Best Rap Solo Performance, but lost to "Let Me Ride" by Dr. Dre.

== Credits and personnel ==
- Vocals: Mitchell Johnson
- Mastered by: Phil Austin
- Mixed by: Gary "D.J. GLE" Ellis
- Instruments: Dave Cochrane

== Track listing ==
1. "Ditty" (Explicit) - 4:02
2. "Ditty" (Edited) - 3:56
3. "Ditty" (Album Version) - 4:59
4. "Ditty" (Remix - Explicit) - 5:04
5. "Ditty" (Remix - Edited) - 5:04
6. "Ditty" (Radio Mix - feat. Nate Dogg) - 3:51
7. "Ditty" (DJ Remix) - 4:08

== Charts ==
=== Weekly charts ===
Chart (1992–1993)	Peak position
Australia (ARIA)	97
Canada Retail Singles (The Record)	4
Germany (GfK)	93
New Zealand (Recorded Music NZ)	48
US Billboard Hot 100	10
US Hot R&B/Hip-Hop Songs (Billboard)	17
US Hot Rap Songs (Billboard)	20
US Rhythmic Airplay (Billboard)	9

=== Year-end charts ===
Chart (1993)	Position
US Billboard Hot 100	24
US Hot R&B/Hip-Hop Songs (Billboard)	61

== Certifications ==
Region	Certification	Certified units/sales
United States (RIAA)	Platinum	1,000,000^{^}
^{^} Shipments figures based on certification alone.
