= Paperboy (rapper) =

American rapper

- Born: Mitchell Charles Johnson; October 2, 1972 (age 54); Los Angeles, California, U.S.
- Genre: Hip hop
- Occupations: Rapper; songwriter
- Years active: 1990–present
- Labels: Next Plateau, Ruthless

Mitchell Charles Johnson (born October 2, 1972) better known by his stage name Paperboy, is an American rapper. He is best known for his single "Ditty" which charted at #10 on the Hot 100 in 1993.

Johnson was born in Los Angeles, California, and later moved to Oakland.

== Career ==
Paperboy's associated acts were R. Kelly, Eazy-E, and Rhythm D. His most acclaimed album was his 1993 debut, The Nine Yards, which was certified gold by the Recording Industry Association of America (RIAA).

The album featured 10 tracks with G-Funk influenced production from Rhythm D, who was known for producing for artists on Ruthless Records such as Eazy-E, B.G. Knocc Out, and Dresta. Its single "Ditty" is Paperboy's most successful single. Paperboy's second album, City to City, was released in 1996.

== Discography ==
=== Studio albums ===
- The Nine Yards (1993)
- City to City (1996)
- The Love Never Dies (2004)
- The New News (2008)

=== Singles ===
List of singles, with selected chart positions
Title	Year	Peak chart positions				Album
Title	Year	US	AUS	GER	NZ	Album
"Ditty"	1992	10	97	93	48	The Nine Yards
"Bumpin' (Adaptation of Humpin')"	1993	—	—	—	—	The Nine Yards
"Ditty Baby (featuring Terry "Zapp" Troutman)"	2021	—	—	—	—	
"Beef"	2022	—	—	—	—	
"What Took You So Long? (featuring E-40)"	2022	—	—	—	—	
