= Positive K =

American rapper

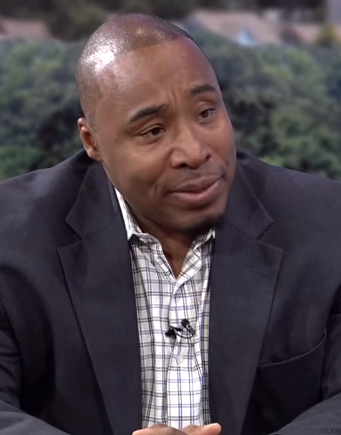
- Positive K in 2018

Background information
- Also known as: Pos K
- Born: Darryl Gibson; August 9, 1967 (age 59)
- Origin: The Bronx, New York, U.S.
- Genres: Hip hop
- Occupations: Rapper; songwriter
- Years active: 1985–present
- Labels: First Priority Music; Atlantic Records; Elektra Records; Island; PolyGram Records; Capitol Records; Creative Control; PosK Records; Mic Check Records
- Website: PositiveK.com

Positive K (sometimes stylized as +K) (born Darryl Gibson on August 9, 1967) is an American MC and songwriter from the Bronx, New York City, New York, and one of the original artists of the First Priority Music camp. He is best known for his songs "I'm Not Havin' It" (a duet with MC Lyte) and his 1992 hit "I Got a Man".

== Early life ==
Darryl Gibson was born August 9, 1967, and was raised in the Bronx, New York and spent much of his childhood near Richman (Echo) Park where early hip hop DJs Grandmaster Flash, DJ Sinbad and Busy Bee would throw block parties. He was inspired as a child to rap when one day The Fearless Four were performing in his neighborhood and invited him to say a rhyme on their mic. Gibson's first musical endeavor was a short-lived rap group with his family named Disco Cousins, and he rapped under the name Baby Breeze.

Later, while a member of the Five-Percent Nation, Gibson joined the rap group Almighty God Committee from Queens, rapping under the name Positive Knowledge Allah. However, after their DJ played the wrong side of a record at a televised rap contest and the rest of the group walked offstage, Gibson continued on as a solo act under the shortened name Positive K.

== Solo career ==
Glenn Toby, a fellow Queens rapper known as Mr Sweety G, produced Positive K's first solo record "Getting Paid" for the short-lived independent label Star Maker Records. The track brought him recognition after it was included on the label's showcase album Fast Money, a 1986 compilation featuring Rob Base and DJ E-Z Rock's debut recording and a track by hip hop pioneer Disco Dave.

In 1987, Positive K signed to Nat Robinson's First Priority Music under the management of Lumumba Carson (the son of activist Sonny Carson) who would later become better known as X-Clan founding member Professor X The Overseer. With the guidance and production skills of Grand Puba of Brand Nubian and Daddy-O of Stetsasonic, Positive K released a number of songs that appeared on various underground compilations. His 1989 duet with MC Lyte "I'm Not Havin' It" was Positive K's first song to land on a Billboard music chart and it helped further establish his reputation in hip hop. Positive K soon left First Priority Music, feeling there was favoritism happening with the owner's relatives on the label.

After leaving First Priority Music, Positive K began working closely with Big Daddy Kane, whom he'd met through a mutual friend. He would bring Positive K on stage to freestyle with Jay-Z and Sauce Money. Guest spots on Brand Nubian’s One for All and Grand Puba's Reel to Reel along with his self-released, Big Daddy Kane-produced single "Nightshift" generated enough interest to land him a major record label deal.

The Skills Dat Pay Da Bills, Positive K's 1992 full-length debut on Island Records, balanced themes of Nation of Gods and Earths with gangsta-isms and more pop-based moments. The album's most successful single was "I Got a Man," a track loosely based on his earlier duet with MC Lyte "I'm Not Havin' It." This time, however, he pitch-shifted his own vocals to perform the lines of the track's female rapper himself. "I Got A Man" reached No. 14 on the Billboard Hot 100 in early 1993. Meanwhile, he kept his Creative Control label in operation, signing and cultivating new talent.

Later that year, Positive K was featured in a remix of the song "Come To Butt-head" with Beavis and Butt-head on the soundtrack album for the film The Beavis and Butt-head Experience. The song is hidden at the end of the album on the same track as "I Got You Babe," performed by Beavis and Butt-head with Cher. The same year, Positive K briefly appeared in the Robert De Niro film A Bronx Tale as an angry protester and was featured on WYBE's Old School Show, where he was awarded the No. 3 slot on the list of early hip hop pioneers.

After touring extensively to promote The Skills Dat Pay Da Bills, Positive K focused his efforts on other interests. Island Records had wanted him to record a full album with Grand Puba, but only one song, "Back Together Again," was recorded and the track never saw release. Instead, he started a promotion company, handling record promotions for Def Jam Recordings and London Records, and booked acts in his Harlem studio. During this time, he also worked with Outkast, Rampage and Puff Daddy. Eventually he became fed up with the music business and took a short break from it.

In late 1996, Positive K re-emerged and told Billboard Magazine that his sophomore album, due out in February 1997, would be named Straight to the Moon. He explained the album, like his debut, would be released on both his personal record label Creative Control as well as Island Records, and would feature guest appearances by Al Green and Harry Connick Jr. Its Teddy Riley-produced lead single "Black Cinderella" saw an independent label 1996 release on PosK Records but the full album never materialized.

Positive K has continued to release music without duplicating his earlier success of "I Got a Man," earning him the status of one hit wonder. In 2007, he appeared on Nas's track "Where Are They Now ('90s Remix)." In 2008, a compilation album Back to the Old School was released under the EchoVista label. In 2015, Positive K teamed with Greg Nice on his song "Make It Happen" which led to a pairing that would result in a full-length album in 2017, preceded by its lead single was "Bring It." The pair refer to themselves individually as PK Dolla and N.I. and collectively as Gr8te Mindz, but the album is sold online under the artist name "Positive K and Greg Nice."

Positive K told Unkut in 2013 that his next solo effort would be titled Pos K in the Extreme, but it has yet to surface.

== Discography ==
=== Albums ===
List of albums, with selected chart positions
Title	Album details	Peak chart positions	
Title	Album details	US	US R&B
The Skills Dat Pay da Bills	Released: November 3, 1992; Label: Island, PolyGram; Format: CD, LP, MC, digital download	168	50
Back to the Old School (compilation)	Released: September 16, 2008; Label: Echo-Vista; Format: CD, digital download	—	—
Gr8te Mindz (with Greg Nice)	Released: March 10, 2017; Label: Brainbust; Format: CD, digital download	—	—
"—" denotes a recording that did not chart or was not released in that territory.

=== Singles ===
Year	Song	US			NL	NZ	UK	Certifications	Album
Year	Song	Billboard Hot 100	R&B	Rap	NL	NZ	UK	Certifications	Album
1987	"Quarter Gram Pam"	—	—	—	—	—	—	—	single only
1988	"I'm Not Havin' It" (with MC Lyte)	—	—	16	—	—	—	—	single only
1988	"Step Up Front"	—	—	—	—	—	—	—	single only
1991	"Night Shift"	—	—	17	—	—	—	—	The Skills Dat Pay da Bills
1992	"I Got a Man"	14	10	1	14	41	43	RIAA: Gold	The Skills Dat Pay da Bills
1992	"Ain't No Crime"	—	—	16	—	—	—	—	The Skills Dat Pay da Bills
1993	"Carhoppers (Radio Version)"	—	—	—	—	—	—	—	The Skills Dat Pay da Bills
1995	"Mr Jiggalino"	—	—	—	—	—	—	—	single only
1996	"What You Want"	—	—	—	—	—	—	—	single only
1996	"Black Cinderella"	—	92	—	—	—	—	—	single only
1997	"How Yah Livin'"	—	—	—	—	—	—	—	single only
1999	"E & J"	—	—	—	—	—	—	—	single only
1999	"Feel Good 'Bout Myself"	—	—	—	—	—	—	—	single only
2001	"Supreme Alphabet"	—	—	—	—	—	—	—	single only
2009	"I'm Not Havin' It (re-recorded)" / "I Got a Man (re-recorded)"	—	—	—	—	—	—	—	single only
2015	"Make It Happen" (with Greg Nice)	—	—	—	—	—	—	—	single only
2017	"Bring It" (with Greg Nice)	—	—	—	—	—	—	—	Gr8te Mindz
