= I Got a Man =

Single by Positive K

from the album The Skills Dat Pay da Bills
- Released: December 1, 1992
- Recorded: 1992
- Genre: Hip hop
- Length: 3:52
- Label: Island
- Songwriters: Byron Lee Miller, Roland Bautista, Darryl Gibson, Janice Marie Johnson
- Producer: Shawn Thomas

Positive K singles chronology
"Nightshift" (1991)	"I Got a Man" (1992)	"Ain't No Crime" (1993)

Music video
- "I Got a Man" on YouTube

"I Got a Man" is a song by American hip hop rapper Positive K. It was released in December 1992 as the lead single from his debut album The Skills Dat Pay Da Bills.

== Creation of the song ==
The song features spoken word dialog between a man and woman character, in which the man repeatedly asks the woman out and she continually rebuffs his advances by pointing out she is already in a relationship.

In creating the song, Positive K provided not only the man's dialogue but also the woman's dialogue by raising the pitch of his voice using studio technology.

== Release ==
The single peaked at number 14 on the US Billboard Hot 100 on the chart week of March 20, 1993, making it the rapper's only Top 40 hit. It sold over 500,000 copies and was certified gold by the Recording Industry Association of America.

== Music video ==
There were two music videos for "I Got a Man". The first version was directed by Hype Williams, while the second version was directed by Jeff Byrd.

== Samples ==
The music samples the following:

- the 1980 disco single "Rescue Me" by A Taste of Honey
- the song "Spread Love" by the a cappella group Take 6
- the song "High Power Rap" by the rap group Crash Crew
- the electric guitar riff from "Mama Used To Say" by Junior
- the horn from "Get Up and Dance" by Freedom
- The spoken intro of the song ("How can the same shit happen to the same guy twice?") is sampled from the 1990 film Die Hard 2 in which John McClane (played by Bruce Willis) complains about his bad luck.
- the song "Kuff" by dancehall artist Shelly Thunder

== Tributes to the song ==
In 1999, Chanté Moore and Jermaine Dupri used an interpolation of the song on their remix of "Chanté's Got a Man". In 2023, "IDGAF", a song by Tee Grizzley, featuring Chris Brown and Mariah the Scientist, resembles this song.

== Charts ==
=== Weekly charts ===
Weekly chart performance for "I Got a Man"
Chart (1992–1993)	Peak position
Australia (ARIA)	123
Netherlands (Dutch Top 40)	12
New Zealand (Recorded Music NZ)	41
UK Singles (Official Charts)	43
US Billboard Hot 100	14
US Billboard Hot Dance Music/Maxi-Singles Sales	14
US Billboard Hot R&B/Hip-Hop Songs	10
US Billboard Hot Rap Singles	1
US Billboard Rhythmic Top 40	12

=== Year-end charts ===
Year-end chart performance for "I Got a Man"
Chart (1993)	Position
US Billboard Hot 100	63
