= Get On Up and Dance =

Studio album by Quad City DJ's
- Released: June 25, 1996
- Recorded: 1995–1996
- Length: 54:32
- Label: Quadrasound, Big Beat
- Producer: Jay Ski; C.C. Lemonhead

Singles from Get On Up and Dance
- 1. "C'mon N' Ride It (The Train)" Released: March 19, 1996

Get On Up and Dance is the only studio album by American hip hop group Quad City DJ's. The group was made up of Jay Ski and C.C. Lemonhead, both of whom had previously worked with Chill Deal, 95 South and 69 Boyz, and producing hits such as "Whoot, There It Is" and "Tootsee Roll" for them. Singer JeLanna “Lana” LaFleur was added to the group after being discovered dancing at the Tootsie Roll video shoot. Once recognized for her dancing abilities, she decided to show off her vocal skills in the studio and quickly was added as a member contributing all of the vocals to the album. The album contained the major hit single "C'mon N' Ride It (The Train)" which peaked at number 3 on the Billboard Hot 100 and went Platinum. Get On Up and Dance peaked at number 31 on the Billboard 200 and was certified Platinum by the Recording Industry Association of America (RIAA) for selling over a million copies in the United States.

== Critical reception ==
Professional ratings
Review scores
Source	Rating
AllMusic	3/5 stars
Cash Box	(favorable)
Robert Christgau	3/3 stars

Despite feeling repetitive at times and lacking tracks that match the catchability of "C'mon N' Ride It", Johnny Loftus from AllMusic said the album works best as a "harmless, humorous, and entertaining diversion" at parties, concluding that, "Hovering at an average of 132 beats per minute, Get On Up and Dance also never makes the mistake of including a ballad or an unfunny skit. It's all about dancing, all the time."

== Track listing ==
No.	Title	Writer(s)	Length
1.	"C'mon N' Ride It (The Train)"	R. Ullery	7:31
2.	"Work Baby Work (The Prep)"		5:34
3.	"Let's Do It"		4:38
4.	"Quad City Funk"		3:28
5.	"Hey DJ"		2:10
6.	"Stomp-N-Grind" (featuring 69 Boyz)		3:58
7.	"Get On Up and Dance"		1:05
8.	"Summer Jam"		3:23
9.	"Party Over Here"		3:14
10.	"The Bass"		3:58
11.	"Move to This"		3:27
12.	"Ride That Bass" (featuring 69 Boyz)		4:27
13.	"C'mon N' Ride It (The Train)" (Dance Remix)		8:05

== Charts and certifications ==
=== Weekly charts ===
Chart (1996)	Peak position
US Billboard 200	31
US Top R&B/Hip-Hop Albums (Billboard)	23

=== Year-end charts ===
Chart (1996)	Position
US Billboard 200	128
US Top R&B/Hip-Hop Albums (Billboard)	92

=== Certifications ===
Region	Certification	Certified units/sales
United States (RIAA)	Platinum	1,000,000^{^}
^{^} Shipments figures based on certification alone.
