= Space Jam (disambiguation) =

Space Jam is a 1996 film starring Michael Jordan and the Looney Tunes characters.

- Related releases include:
  - Space Jam (soundtrack), music from the 1996 film
    - "Space Jam", the title song from the soundtrack
  - Space Jam (pinball), a pinball game based on the 1996 film
  - Space Jam (video game), a 1996 video game for the Sega Saturn and Sony PlayStation
  - Teen Titans Go! See Space Jam, a 2021 crossover movie with Teen Titans Go!
  - Space Jam: A New Legacy, a 2021 sequel to the 1996 film, starring LeBron James

Space Jam may also refer to:

- "Space Jam" (Yes, Dear episode), an episode of the television series Yes, Dear
