= One Mo' 'Gen =

Studio album by 95 South
- Released: January 10, 1995
- Recorded: 1994
- Genre: Hip hop, Southern rap, Miami bass
- Length: 42:52
- Label: Rip-It
- Producer: 95 South, Jay Ski McGowan, C.C. Lemonhead

95 South chronology
| Quad City Knock (1993) | One Mo' 'Gen (1995) | Tightwork 3000 (2000) |

Professional ratings
Review scores
| Source | Rating |
|---|---|
| AllMusic | 3/5 stars |
| The Encyclopedia of Popular Music | 3/5 stars |

One Mo' 'Gen is the second album by Southern rap group 95 South. It was released in 1995. It peaked at #158 on the Billboard 200. A minor hit, "Rodeo," peaked at #77 on the Billboard Hot 100.

The album was produced mostly by the production duo of Jay Ski and C.C. Lemonhead, who also were members of the 69 Boyz and the Quad City DJ's. It didn't chart quite as well as the group's debut, Quad City Knock.

== Critical reception ==
AllMusic called the album "an improvement on [the group's] debut, featuring more confident rapping and stronger, funkier backing tracks."

== Track listing ==
1. "Bassfoyoace" – 0:50
2. "Quad City Funk" – 1:55
3. "All the Way Down" – 2:35
4. "Rodeo" – 3:34
5. "Wine and Dine" – 4:01
6. "One Mo' Gen" – 2:29
7. "Trip to the Geto" – 4:17
8. "I Tell U What" – 3:28
9. "Ride Out" – 2:14
10. "Freak Ya Down" – 3:19
11. "Heiny Heiny" – 3:01
12. "Break It On Down" – 2:26
13. "Down South" – 4:33
14. "Cowboy Mix" – 4:10
