= Sunset Park (soundtrack) =

Sunset Park (Original Motion Picture Soundtrack)

Soundtrack album by various artists
- Released: April 23, 1996
- Recorded: 1994–96
- Studio: Can-Am Studios (Los Angeles, CA); 36 Chambers Studio (Staten Island, NY); Larrabee Studio (Los Angeles, CA); Undercity Studios (Hackensack, NJ); The Hit Factory (New York); Giant Recording Studio (New York, NY); KrossWire Studio (Atlanta, GA); The Junk Yard (Orlando, FL); Americayan Recording Studio (N. Hollywood, CA); Doorway Studios (Dallas, TX); D&D Studios (New York, NY)
- Genre: Hip hop; R&B
- Length: 57:47
- Label: Elektra
- Producer: Anita Camarata (exec.); Merlin Bobb (exec.); Queen Latifah (exec.); Sha-Kim (exec.); Sylvia Rhone (exec.); Dedra N. Tate (co-exec.); KayGee (also exec.); Alan Fouse; Bass Mechanics; Bryce Wilson; Carl Roland; Charles Jordan; Darren Lighty; Daz Dillinger; Easy Mo Bee; Jermaine Dupri; Livio Harris; Miles Goodman; Mobb Deep; RZA; Sergio; Tony Pizarro; Big Mike (co.); Hot Mike (co.); Max Gousse (co.); Roget Romain (co.); Warren Adams (co.)

Singles from Sunset Park
- 1. "Keep On Keepin' On" Released: March 13, 1996; 2. "Hoop N Yo Face" Released: March 19, 1996; 3. "Are You Ready" Released: March 26, 1996

Professional ratings
Review scores
Source	Rating
AllMusic	4.5/5 stars

Sunset Park (Original Motion Picture Soundtrack) is the soundtrack to Steve Gomer's 1996 film Sunset Park. It was released on April 23, 1996 through EastWest Records America/Elektra Music Group.

Recording sessions took place at Can-Am Studios, at Larrabee Studio and at Americayan Recording Studio in Los Angeles, at 36 Chambers Studio, at The Hit Factory, at Giant Recording Studio and at D&D Studios in New York, at Undercity Studios in Hackensack, at KrossWire Studio in Atlanta, at The Junk Yard in Orlando and at Doorway Studios in Dallas.

Production was handled by Alan Fouse, Bass Mechanics, Bryce Wilson, Carl Roland, Charles Jordan, Darren Lighty, Daz Dillinger, Easy Mo Bee, Jermaine Dupri, Livio Harris, Miles Goodman, Mobb Deep, RZA, Sergio, Tony Pizarro and KayGee who also served as executive soundtrack album producer along with Merlin Bobb, Queen Latifah, Sha-Kim and Sylvia Rhone.

In addition to Latifah, it features contributions from 2Pac, 69 Boyz, Aaliyah, Adina Howard, Big Mike, Ghostface Killah, Groove Theory, Junior M.A.F.I.A., MC Lyte, Mobb Deep, Onyx, Quad City DJ's, Raekwon, Spank D, Tha Dogg Pound, Xscape and Miles Goodman.

The album peaked at number four on the Billboard 200 and at number one on the Top R&B/Hip-Hop Albums. On June 18, 1996, it was certified Platinum by the Recording Industry Association of America. In 2012 Complex magazine listed the album #8 on its The 25 Best Hip-Hop Movie Soundtracks Of All Time.

== Track listing ==
No.	Title	Writer(s)	Producer(s)	Length
1.	"High 'Til I Die" (performed by 2Pac)	Tupac Shakur; Tony Pizarro	Tony Pizarro	4:07
2.	"Motherless Child" (performed by Ghostface Killah and Raekwon)	Robert Diggs; Dennis Coles	RZA	4:48
3.	"Just Doggin'" (performed by Tha Dogg Pound)	Delmar Arnaud; Ricardo Brown	Dat Nigga Daz	4:39
4.	"Back at You" (performed by Mobb Deep)	Kejuan Muchita; Albert Johnson; Hal David; Burt Bacharach	Mobb Deep	3:43
5.	"Are You Ready" (performed by Aaliyah)	Renee Neufville	Kay Gee; Darren Lighty	4:07
6.	"It's Alright" (performed by Groove Theory)	Amel Larrieux; Bryce Wilson; Darryl Brown	Bryce Wilson	4:05
7.	"Elements I'm Among" (performed by Queen Latifah)	Dana Owens	Easy Mo Bee	4:32
8.	"Keep On, Keepin' On" (performed by MC Lyte and Xscape)	Jermaine Dupri; Lana Moorer	Jermaine Dupri	4:35
9.	"Hoop N Yo Face" (performed by 69 Boyz and Quad City DJ's)	Jay McGowan; Van Bryant; Nathaniel Orange	Bass Mechanics and Phat Albert Productions	4:50
10.	"For the Funk" (performed by Adina Howard and Spank D)	Reggie Dube; Warren Adams; George Clinton; Garry Shider; Walter Morrison	Livio Harris; Carl Roland; Charles Jordan; Alan Fouse; Max Gousse (co.); Roget Romain (co.); Warren Adams (co.)	4:05
11.	"We Don't Need It" (performed by Junior M.A.F.I.A.)	James Lloyd; Kimberly Jones; Trife	Minnesota; Hot Mike (co.)	4:19
12.	"All Uv It" (performed by Big Mike)	Will Barnett; Michael Barnett; Ernest Polk Jr.; Jack McNair; Barrett Powell; Darrell Yates; Sean Price; James Bush; Tekomin Williams; Kenyatta Blake; Gil Evans; James Savage; Nathaniel Motley; George Clinton	Ernest "Sergio" Polk Jr.; Big Mike (co.)	3:07
13.	"Thangz Changed" (performed by Onyx)	Fredro Scruggs; Kirk Jones; Tyrone Taylor		3:59
14.	"Shorty's Game" (performed by Miles Goodman)	Miles Goodman	Miles Goodman	2:51
Total length:				57:47

Notes

- Tracks 5, 6 and 12 did not appear in the film.

Sample credits

- Track 2 contains elements from traditional song "Motherless Child" and "Into Something (Can't Shake Loose)" written by James Shaw and Earl Randle as both performed by O. V. Wright
- Track 4 embodies portions of "The Look of Love" written by Burt Bacharach and Hal David as performed by Isaac Hayes
- Track 5 contains samples from "Movin' In The Right Direction" written and performed by Steve Parks
- Track 8 contains a replayed portion of "Liberian Girl" written by Michael Jackson
- Track 10 contains elements from "One Nation Under A Groove" written by George Clinton, Garry Shider and Walter Morrison
- Track 12 contains samples from "Heads Ain't Redee" written by Barrett Powell, Jack McNair, Darrell Yates, Sean Price, James Bush, Tekomin Williams, Kenyatta Blake and Gil Evans and performed by Black Moon & Smif 'n Wessun, "One More Chance" written by Sean Combs, Christopher Wallace, Carl Thompson and the Bluez Brothers and performed by the Notorious B.I.G. and "The Loc Is On His Own" written by James Savage, Nathaniel Motley and George Clinton and performed by Jayo Felony

== Personnel ==
- Anita Camarata – executive music producer, management
- Dana Owens – executive soundtrack album producer
- Kier Lamont Gist – executive soundtrack album producer
- Merlin Bobb-Willis – executive soundtrack album producer
- Sylvia Rhone – executive soundtrack album producer
- Shakim Compere – executive soundtrack album producer
- Dedra N. Tate – co-executive soundtrack album producer, management
- Mary Kusnier – project coordinator, management
- Shirley Bell – music supervisor, management
- Rosa Menkes – design
- Aaron Seawood – management
- Abigail Adams – management
- Alan Voss – management
- Anne Kristoff – management
- Annette Chaparro – management
- Aurora Montes De Oca – management
- Beth Patterson – management
- Billy Allrich – management
- Brian Cohen – management
- Carolyn Tracey – management
- Darryl "Latee" French – management
- Donna Johns – management
- Gary Casson – management
- Greg Robinson – management
- Greg Thompson – management
- Jade Robledo – management
- Karen Mason – management
- Kevin Weekes – management
- Lauren Spencer – management
- Lisa West – management
- Mae Attaway – management
- Michael "Blue" Williams – management
- Monya Vanderpool – management
- Morshia Ellis – management
- Paul Compere – management
- Rene McLean – management
- Richard Nash – management
- Rick A. Brown – management
- Rita Owens – management
- Sandra Cordoba – management
- Sonia Ives – management
- Steve Heldt – management
- Steve Kleinberg – management
- Jacque L. Shirley – legal advice & counsel

== Charts ==
=== Weekly charts ===
Chart (1996)	Peak position
US Billboard 200	4
US Top R&B/Hip-Hop Albums (Billboard)	1

=== Year-end charts ===
Chart (1996)	Position
US Billboard 200	115
US Top R&B/Hip-Hop Albums (Billboard)	29

== Certifications ==
Region	Certification	Certified units/sales
United States (RIAA)	Platinum	1,000,000^{^}
^{^} Shipments figures based on certification alone.

== See also ==
- List of Billboard number-one R&B albums of 1996
