= Quad City Knock =

Studio album by 95 South
- Released: April 15, 1993
- Recorded: 1992, 1993
- Genres: Hip hop, Southern rap, Miami bass
- Length: 48:08
- Label: Wrap
- Producers: 95 South, Jay Ski McGowan, C.C. Lemonhead

95 South chronology
Quad City Knock (1993)	One Mo' 'Gen (1995)

Professional ratings
Review scores
Source	Rating
AllMusic	3/5 stars

Quad City Knock is the debut album by Southern rap group 95 South, released in April 1993. It peaked at No. 71 on the Billboard 200 albums chart. The single, "Whoot, There It Is", peaked at No. 11 on the Billboard Hot 100. It was produced mostly by the production duo of Jay Ski and C.C. Lemonhead, who would go on to form the 69 Boyz and Quad City DJ's.

== Track listing ==
All tracks are written by McGowan and N. Orange, except where noted. Produced by Bass Mechanics for Purple Productions.

No.	Title	Writer(s)	Length
1.	"Whoot! There It Is" (Ultimix)		4:36
2.	"Hump Wit It"		5:00
3.	"Booty Hop"	M. Jackson; R. Hanson (BMI); McGowan; N. Orange	3:03
4.	"Whoot! There It Is"		3:03
5.	"Bring Out da Ho's"	95 South	2:04
6.	"Do It Baby"		3:42
7.	"This Is a Test"	M. Phillips	0:07
8.	"60 Seconds"	N. Orange	1:11
9.	"Let's Go to My Room"		4:28
10.	"Shouts Out"	McGowan	0:25
11.	"One Time"	95 South	1:27
12.	"K-Knock in da House/We Got da Bass"	McGowan	1:41
13.	"Shake, Rattle, n' Roll"		2:53
14.	"Da Kinda Bass"	McGowan; M. Phillips; N. Orange	3:22
15.	"So Clear"	N. Orange	4:07
16.	"Ghetto Style"	M. Phillips; J. McGowan; N. Orange	4:58
Total length:			48:08

=== WRAP CD ===
The 1993 WRAP Records CD release lacks the Ultimix of "Whoot! There It Is", containing only the original album version. "Booty Man Battle" and "95 South in da House" are added as track 13 and track 15 respectively. The printed media lists "K-Knock in da House" and "We Got da Bass" as separate tracks, giving a total of 18, despite the audio data combining these as above, giving an actual total of 17 tracks.

No.	Title	Length
13.	"Booty Man Battle"	0:42
15.	"95 South in da House"	1:41
