= Together Brothers =

- Directed by: William A. Graham
- Written by: Jack DeWitt; Joe Greene
- Produced by: Robert L. Rosen
- Starring: Ahmad Nurradin; Anthony Wilson; Nelson Sims; Owen Pace; Kenneth Bell; Kim Dorsey
- Cinematography: Philip H. Lathrop; Charles Rosher Jr.
- Edited by: Stanley E. Johnson
- Music by: Barry White; Gene Page
- Production company: Sanford–Howard Productions
- Distributed by: 20th Century Fox
- Release date: August 7, 1974
- Running time: 95 minutes
- Country: United States
- Language: English

Together Brothers is a 1974 American crime drama film written by Jack DeWitt and Joe Greene and directed by William A. Graham The film stars Ahmad Nurradin, Anthony Wilson, Ed Bernard, Lincoln Kilpatrick, Glynn Turman, Richard Yniguez and Angela Gibbs.

Made in the 1970s, the movie has been characterized as a blaxploitation film. The film premiered in August 1974 in New York. Barry White produced and wrote the accompanying soundtrack. This is the only movie which White wrote a complete musical score for.

== Plot ==
Mr. Kool is a policeman who patrols one of the toughest sections of Galveston. He is widely respected by the community for being understanding, but yet tough. Among his following are the "Dudes", a teenage gang headed by H.J. Other members of the gang include Monk, A.P., Mau Mau and Gri Gri, and H.J.'s little brother Tommy is an unofficial member. Their hangout is in an old abandoned train freight warehouse. Mr. Kool stops by from time to time to scold them when he finds one of them breaking the law.

One night, Tommy is following Mr. Kool when he is gunned down by an unknown gunman. When the gunman begins to cut up the dead body, Tommy screams, resulting in the gunman shooting at Tommy but the gun misfires. Before he can reload, he is scared off by other people approaching.

As a result of witnessing the shooting, Tommy is unable to speak, so H.J. and Mama Wes take him to the doctor. Outside the funeral for Mr. Kool, the gang vows to catch the killer. Later, at their clubhouse, Strokes McGee stops by and tells them they need to sneak into the police station, with the help of Vega, to get a look at the police files they have on Mr. Kool.

After retrieving the files, each gang member is assigned a suspect to check out. Their first solid tip comes from Francine, H.J.'s girlfriend, who gives them incriminating information about two homosexuals, Billy Most and Maria. When the gang gets to Maria's apartment, they discover Maria hanged.

When they get back to the clubhouse, they discover that Francine has been killed, and Tommy is missing. The gang tracks Tommy and Billy to the pier and upon their arrival, Tommy manages to escape. Billy breaks down and starts crying and the police arrive and take him into custody. The brothers walk off into the night, establishing their identity as "Together Brothers".

== Cast ==
- Ahmad Nurradin as H.J.
- Anthony Wilson as Tommy
- Nelson Sims as A.P.
- Kenneth Bell as Mau-Mau
- Owen Pace as Monk
- Kim Dorsey as Gri-Gri
- Ed Bernard as Mr. Kool
- Lincoln Kilpatrick as Billy Most
- Glynn Turman as Dr. Johnson
- Richard Yniguez as Vega
- Angela Gibbs as Francine
- Mwako Cumbuka as Strokes McGee
- Frances Williams as Mama Wes
- Craig Campfield as Maria
- Bessie Griffin as Rev. Brown
- Lynne Holmes as Sugar
- Danny Big Black as Armstrong
- Gloria Calomee as Alice Martin
- Howard Picard as Detective
- Charles Lemons as Matthew
- Joe Zapata as Chicano
- Leah Ward as Clutie
- William Dagg as Desk Officer
- Roberta Ester as Nurse
- Ernest Boyd as Harry
- John Jennings as Policeman
- Lane Mitchell as Dude

== Analysis ==
Wes Lawson wrote in Film & History that the movie contains all of the blaxploitation genre's establishing features: "vulgarity, violence, and vanity," but handles these atypically. He further notes that there is one depiction of graphic violence in the movie, and it also features racial epithets and other various obscenities, but "it does not overplay these elements."

Lawson also points out the significance of the gay characters in the film, because while the characters of Billy Most (Lincoln Kilpatrick) and Maria (Craig Campfield) "can be viewed as stereotypes – drag queens with lisps – they are two of the most fully fleshed out gay characters to appear in blaxploitation films." Lawson goes on to argue that while the film does feature many of the issues that the "blaxploitation genre had up until this point, it also represents a crucial turning point toward the end of the movement, when filmmakers began to move away from the conventions established by earlier films."

== Reception ==
Film critic Lawrence Van Gelder wrote: "preaching cooperation, brotherhood and a sense of obligation while stopping short of advocating vigilante justice, the film has its hearts in the right place; street-wise older children might find it to their taste; but all the new trappings cannot disguise the fact that it is an old story being retold perhaps wisely, but not exceptionally well."

Dayton Daily News wrote "a creditable cast of unknowns is put through its paces by a relatively unknown director working with a slightly above average script." DVD Talk observed that "as a whole, Together Brothers lead and supporting performances are strong for non-actors and/or general unknowns, while the film's lived-in appearance and natural dialogue make the viewing experience feel a great deal more realistic than expected."

Newsday said it is a "tolerable picture with a discernible amount of integrity and in the black–exploitation field, that's something." Ann Guarino wrote in the New York Daily News that the filmmakers "have caught the tense ambiance of a ghetto and their characters are convincing; Graham draws fine performances from the cast; the standout, however, is little Anthony Wilson as the darling, big–eyed Tommy."

Film critic Steve Hogner said "as the story unfolds, the two divergent hunts slowly merge to a chilling well-executed finale guaranteed to send an audience right up the wall." He went on to compliment the director for "fashioning a stylized thriller that builds on itself working within and without the black genre; enough of the film is still familiar in the context of black films, but Graham manages to keep these scenes more a study of ghetto life than the 'off whitey' syndrome so common in these films."

== Soundtrack ==
The film's soundtrack was released in July 1974 by 20th Century Fox Records. The album was written and produced by Barry White, with the exception of "Can't Seem to Find Him", which was written by White and Gene Page. Additional vocals on the album were by Love Unlimited, backed up by The Love Unlimited Orchestra. This film is the only movie which White wrote a complete musical score for. The album peaked at 96 on the Billboard 200, and peaked at 33 on the Top R&B/Hip-Hop Albums chart. It also peaked at 61 on the Cash Box Top 100. The soundtrack was nominated for Best Musical Score at the 8th Annual NAACP Image Awards.

White said the only reason he did the soundtrack "was because 20th Century led me to believe the movie was important to them, but it really wasn't. The movie didn't do nothing, but the album went platinum." AllMusic said in their review that "the lightness of tone and many string-laden numbers on the album shouldn't be a surprise ... since they reflect White's romantic soul style: ghetto streets flowing with champagne; on a majority of the tracks, White's spacious and silky arrangements and the Love Unlimited Orchestra's adroit backing are substantial enough to offset the album's weaker moments." The soundtrack was released to CD in 1999. The 1996 song "C'mon N' Ride It (The Train)" by Quad City DJ's from their album Get On Up and Dance, is based on a sample of "Theme from Together Brothers" from the soundtrack.

== See also ==
- List of American films of 1974
- List of blaxploitation films
- List of LGBTQ-related films of 1974
- List of hood films
