= Hoop N Yo Face =

1996 single by 69 Boyz featuring Quad City DJ's

Single by 69 Boyz featuring Quad City DJ's

from the album Sunset Park
- Released: March 19, 1996
- Genre: Hip hop, Southern hip hop, Miami bass
- Length: 4:50
- Label: East West
- Songwriters: Albert Van Bryant, Jay McGowan, Nathaniel Orange
- Producers: Bass Mechanics and Phat Albert Productions

69 Boyz singles chronology
"Party" (1994)	"Hoop N Yo Face" (1996)	"Woof Woof" (1998)

Quad City DJ's singles chronology
"C'mon N' Ride It (The Train)" (1996)	"Hoop N Yo Face" (1996)	"Space Jam" (1996)

"Hoop N Yo Face" is a song by American hip hop group 69 Boyz featuring American music group Quad City DJ's. It is featured on the soundtrack to the 1996 film Sunset Park.

== Charts ==
Chart (1996)	Peak position
US Billboard Hot 100	95
US Hot R&B/Hip-Hop Songs (Billboard)	62
US Hot Rap Songs (Billboard)	19
