= The Wait Is Over =

Studio album by 69 Boyz
- Released: July 21, 1998
- Recorded: 1998
- Genre: Hip hop, Southern rap, Miami bass
- Label: Big Beat
- Producer: Nick Rodell

69 Boyz chronology
199Quad (1994)	The Wait Is Over (1998)	2069 (2000)

Singles from The Wait Is Over
- 1. "Woof Woof" Released: 1998; 2. "Get on Your Feet" Released: 1998

Professional ratings
Review scores
Source	Rating
Allmusic	3/5 stars

The Wait Is Over is the second album by the Southern rap group 69 Boyz, released in 1998. It was a moderate success, peaking at number 114 on the Billboard Hot 200, lower than their previous album, 199Quad. It contained the hit single "Woof Woof", which peaked at number 31 on the Billboard Hot 100 and was on the soundtrack of Dr. Dolittle. Jay Ski and C.C. Lemonhead (the Quad City DJ's) produced many of the songs.

== Track listing ==
1. "Intro" - 0:06
2. "Roll Wit It" - 2:57
3. "Sticky" - 2:59
4. "Get on Your Feet" - 5:47
5. "Freak You Down 2 da Bass" - 4:13
6. "What's a Catch 22" - 1:47
7. "Catch 22" - 2:01
8. "Backseat" - 2:18
9. "Da Set (Intro)" - 0:11
10. "Da Set Pt. 2" - 5:34
11. "Roll Call (Intro)" - 0:08
12. "Roll Call" - 4:21
13. "Strip Club (Intro)" - 0:19
14. "Strip Club Luv" - 4:39
15. "Do You Want It? (Intro)" - 0:22
16. "Do You Want It, Baby?" - 2:18
17. "Beep Beep" - 3:09
18. "Wasn't Me" - 3:42
19. "Wilbert" - 0:38
20. "ICU" - 3:58
21. "Woof Woof" - 4:31
22. "2 A.M. (Intro)" - 0:10
23. "2 A.M. (Whatcha Doin'?)" - 4:01
24. "Girls Just Wanna" - 3:32
25. "I Need You (Skit)" - 0:06
26. "I Need You '98" - 4:09
27. "One God, One Judge" - 3:23

"Strip Club Luv" and "Strip Club Luv (intro)" sample The Isley Brothers' 1982 song, "All In My Lover's Eyes".
