= Space Jam (song) =

1996 single by Quad City DJ's

Single by Quad City DJ's

from the album Space Jam: Music from and Inspired by the Motion Picture
- Released: December 3, 1996
- Length: 5:04
- Label: Warner Sunset; Atlantic
- Songwriters: Johnny McGowan; Nathaniel Orange; Valerie Bryant
- Producer: Johnny McGowan

Quad City DJ's singles chronology
"Hoop N Yo Face" (1996)	"Space Jam" (1996)	"Summer Jam" (1997)

Space Jam singles chronology
"I Believe I Can Fly" (1996)	"Space Jam" (1996)	"For You I Will" (1997)

"Space Jam" is a song by American music group Quad City DJ's from the soundtrack of the 1996 film of the same name, serving as the theme song. It was successful in the United States, peaking at number 37 on the Billboard Hot 100.

== Background and recording ==
A&R and then-Senior Vice President of Atlantic Records Craig Kallman wanted Quad City DJ's to create a song for the film, believing they would be the most suitable group for it. The group began developing the song upon his request. In regard to the process, C.C. Lemonhead stated:

Most of it was me by myself working on the track, which I probably spent two weeks on give or take. Vocals we spent like three hours tops. [Jay Ski's] yelling so much we pretty much had to get it on the first or second take before he's too hoarse. Then we'd come back and clean it up later. But I'd say three hours tops, because he knows what he wants when he gets in there.

We were trying to figure out what speed we wanted to go with, and experimented with a couple of backtracks. We tried beats with a slower tempo, and one with a lot more rock n' roll feel—there's a song that they played at the basketball games. We did experiment because we were on a bigger playing field now—I mean, a Michael Jordan movie—but we just wanted to explore every option. The song actually turned out way better than I expected at the beginning.

== Critical reception ==
Billboard gave a positive review of the song: "Didn't get enough of 'C'mon N' Ride It (The Train)'? Here ya go ... a fitting sequel to that hit. The act hits a lot of the same marks, rattling a booty-bass beat and contagious chants. The added glow of its connection to the successful film 'Space Jam' only adds to the single's programming allure. No sophomore slump here." David Browne of Entertainment Weekly called the song "shameless Xerox" of "C'mon N' Ride It (The Train)". Shawn M. Haney of AllMusic commented "Quad City DJ's create more electricity with an anthem perfect for game play with the song entitled 'Space Jam.'"

== Other versions ==
In 2021, the song was remixed for early trailers of the sequel film Space Jam: A New Legacy. Since its release, the song has also been heavily used in internet memes and mashups.

== Controversy ==
In 2023, Watson Music Group, which bought the rights to "Space Jam" in 2019 from its original songwriters, began suing companies for copyright infringement by using the song without permission.

== Charts ==
Chart (1996–1997)	Peak position
Australia (ARIA)	97
Germany (GfK)	71
Netherlands (Single Top 100)	67
New Zealand (Recorded Music NZ)	24
UK Singles (Official Charts)	57
US Billboard Hot 100	37
US Hot R&B Singles (Billboard)	49
US Hot Rap Singles (Billboard)	11
