= Kitty Kitty =

1994 single by 69 Boyz

Single by 69 Boyz

from the album 199Quad
- Released: September 18, 1994
- Genre: Hip hop, Southern hip hop, Miami bass
- Length: 4:10
- Label: Rip-It
- Songwriter(s): Albert Van Bryant, Jay McGowan
- Producer(s): 95 South

69 Boyz singles chronology
"Tootsee Roll" (1994)	"Kitty Kitty" (1994)	"Party" (1994)

Music video
- "Kitty Kitty" on YouTube

"Kitty Kitty" is a song by American hip hop group 69 Boyz and the second single from their debut studio album 199Quad (1994). Produced by 95 South, it contains samples of "777-9311" by The Time and "I Taut I Taw a Puddy-Tat".

== Charts ==
Chart (1994–1995)	Peak position
US Billboard Hot 100	51
US Hot R&B/Hip-Hop Songs (Billboard)	36
US Hot Rap Songs (Billboard)	6
US Rhythmic (Billboard)	25
