= Ocean's Thirteen (soundtrack) =

Music from the Motion Picture Ocean's Thirteen

Soundtrack album by David Holmes
- Released: June 5, 2007
- Studios: Ocean Way Recording, Hollywood
- Genres: Film score; jazz; rock
- Length: 44:26
- Labels: Warner Sunset; Warner Bros.
- Producer: David Holmes

David Holmes chronology
The 18th Electricity Plan (2006)	Ocean's Thirteen (2007)	Hunger (2008)

Music from the Motion Picture Ocean's Thirteen is the soundtrack album to the 2007 film Ocean's Thirteen directed by Steven Soderbergh; it is the sequel to Ocean's Twelve (2004) and the third instalment in the Ocean's film series. The soundtrack was released through Warner Sunset Records and Warner Bros. Records on June 5, 2007; unlike the predecessor's soundtracks, the album for Ocean's Thirteen accompanied mostly Holmes' score, with fewer songs.

== Track listing ==
No.	Title	Artist(s)	Length
1.	"Not Their Fight"		1:17
2.	"11, 12 & 13"		1:57
3.	"Benedict Returns"		1:48
4.	"Kensington Chump"		1:40
5.	"Trapdoor Man"		1:07
6.	"Laptops"		0:56
7.	"Zippo's"		0:41
8.	"Shit!Shit!Shit!"		2:02
9.	"Dice Men"		1:54
10.	"Diamond Location"		1:08
11.	"The Nose"		2:30
12.	"Caravan"	Puccio Roelens	3:28
13.	"Suite Bergamasque, Claire De Lune, No. 3"	Isao Tomita	5:51
14.	"Grand Opening"		2:12
15.	"Earthquake"		1:35
16.	"Fender Roads"		2:38
17.	"Snake Eyes"		2:57
18.	"All Sewn Up"		3:14
19.	"This Town"	Frank Sinatra	3:02
20.	"Soul Town"	The Motherhood	2:29
Total length:			44:26

== Reception ==
Jonathan Broxton wrote "Holmes's ensemble remains consistent: a modern string section, jazz percussion, Hammond organs and blaring horns, bass woodwinds and electric guitars to be the order of the day throughout the score, encompassing perfectly the permeating feel of Vegas cool that has run through the entire film series to date. Loungy 1960s rhythms which sound like they could have come from pen of a young John Barry or Jerry Goldsmith combine with a heavy dose of 1970s funk, and although most of the tracks are very much rooted in the same style and feel, the album as a whole is a pleasing diversion." William Ruhlmann of AllMusic wrote "All that keeps this music from working well on its own is that, due to the editing demands of the film, the cues tend to be so short, some less than a minute in length, so that the band launches into an interesting musical idea, only to stop abruptly when a scene in the movie changes."

Spence D. of IGN wrote "Whether or not Ocean's Thirteen lives up to the slick fun of Ocean's Eleven and surpasses the sloppy seconds of Ocean's Twelve remains to be seen. Regardless of the outcome, however, at least Steven Soderbergh can rest easily knowing that he tapped the right man for the soundtrack. More importantly David Holmes and the musicians he used can rest assured that they have crafted a sound that is both vintage and of the here and now and have made the type of film music every composer dreams about: music that transcends the film going experience and is able to stand on its own merits." CNN noted that Holmes' "retro musical cues" propel the film. David Fear of Time Out called it an "impeccable retro-chic score". A reviewer from Readjunk called it "Probably one of the best scores by Holmes to date".

== Chart performance ==
Weekly chart positions for Music from the Motion Picture Ocean's Thirteen
Chart (2007)	Peak position
US Soundtrack Albums (Billboard)	21

== Personnel ==
Credits adapted from liner notes:

- Music Composer, Producer – David Holmes
- Programmed By, Keyboards – Stephen Hilton
- Recorded By, Mixed By – Hugo Nicolson
- Sound Engineer – Wesley Seidman
- Music Editor – Valente Torrez
- Design – Matt Taylor
- Bass, Guitar – Jason Falkner
- Double Bass – Robert Hurst, Tim Lefebvre
- Drums – Zach Danziger
- Dulcimer, Guitar – George Doering
- Electric Piano – Scott Kinsey
- Guitar, Bass, Chamberlin, Toy [Toys] – Woody Jackson
- Harmonica – Tommy Morgan
- Organ, Marxophone, Chamberlin, Sounds [Soundmaker] – Zac Rae
- Percussion – Davey Chegwidden, Hugo Nicolson, Luis Conte
- Guitarete – Leo Abrahams
- Saxophone, Flute – Steve Tavaglione
- Trombone – Bruce Fowler
- Trumpet, Orchestrated By – Walt Fowler
