= Ocean's Twelve (soundtrack) =

Ocean's Twelve (Music from and Inspired by the Motion Picture)

Soundtrack album by David Holmes
- Released: December 10, 2004
- Studios: Cherokee Studios, Hollywood
- Genres: Film score; jazz; electronic; rock
- Length: 55:04
- Labels: Warner Sunset; Warner Bros.
- Producer: David Holmes

David Holmes chronology
Stander (2003)	Ocean's Twelve (2004)	The War Within (2005)

Ocean's Twelve (Music from and Inspired by the Motion Picture) is the soundtrack album to the 2004 heist comedy film Ocean's Twelve directed by Steven Soderbergh; it is the second installment in the Ocean's trilogy and the sequel to Ocean's Eleven (2001). The soundtrack was released through Warner Sunset Records and Warner Bros. Records on December 10, 2004.

== Track listing ==
No.	Title	Artist(s)	Length
1.	"L'Appuntamento"	Ornella Vanoni	4:35
2.	"$165 Million + Interest (Into) The Round Up"		5:43
3.	"L.S.D. Party"	Roland Vincent	2:59
4.	"Lifting the Building"		2:33
5.	"10:35 I Turn Off Camera 3"		2:24
6.	"Crepuscolo Sul Mare"	Piero Umiliani	2:44
7.	"What R We Stealing?"		3:21
8.	"Faust 72"	Dynastie Crisis	3:23
9.	"Stealing the Stock (Into) Le Renard De Nuit"		4:53
10.	"7/29/04 The Day Of"		3:11
11.	"Lazy (Album Version)"	Yellowhammer	4:30
12.	"Explosive Corrosive Joseph"	John Schroeder	2:33
13.	"Yen on a Carousel"		3:13
14.	"The Real Story"		2:55
15.	"Ascension to Virginity"	Dave Grusin	5:05
16.	"Three 8 Bar Drum Loops (Hidden Track)"		1:02
Total length:			55:04

== Reception ==
Anthony Antoniou of Drowned in Sound rated 6/10 to the album and wrote "Unlike the previous two Holmes-Soderbergh albums, Ocean's Twelve for the first time dispenses with the continuous fades interspersed with soundbites of dialogue from the films, opting for a solid set of complete tracks unhindered by overlapping songs or abrupt endings." Rafael Ruiz of Soundtrack.net rated 4/5 and summarized: "This soundtrack is the road music album of the year." A reviewer from Sputnikmusic wrote "For a soundtrack, the Ocean's 12 OST is a rewarding listen. Sure, a lot of people may be turned off by the lack of vocals, but when the musical composition is as strong as it is on this release, its hard not to be swept up in the epic grandeur of this album. An electronic sample based album that doesn't come off like one, its something that's been oh-so-rarely accomplished in modern music. The Ocean's 12 OST not only fits the mood of the film perfectly, but it also proves to be a worthy listen for those who have never seen the film before as well, something that few soundtracks can actually accomplish."

Dorian Lynskey of The Guardian wrote "While Ocean's Twelve is Soderbergh's laziest effort yet, relying too heavily on the appeal of exotic locales and George Clooney in a good suit, the soundtrack might well be Holmes' best." A reviewer from Uncut called the album as "a record nobody could fail to love", while NME described it as "effortlessly hip and seductively suave" and Rolling Stone called it "pure instrumental pleasure". Dotmusic-based critic Dan Gennoe wrote "Like Pitt and Clooney's sharp suits and nonchalant one-liners, it's a deft balance of style and humour. And not since Quincy Jones's score for 'The Italian Job' has it been executed with such precision [...] The barrage of fantastically overzealous psychedelia, 'Batman & Robin' style chase themes and cop-show cool confirm it's the work of a man who knows there's no such thing as incidental music."

Heather Phares of AllMusic wrote "While it's just as fun as the Ocean's Eleven soundtrack was, Ocean's Twelve manages to be subtler and more distinctive in its mix of old and new sounds." Noel Murray of The A.V. Club wrote "Holmes' work is perhaps best put to use in the film itself, where rhythmic editing and a broader selection of songs create a dizzying sensation that at times outstrips the plot's halfhearted capering. Still, even though the Ocean's Twelve soundtrack drops the dialogue snippets and tight edits that made Ocean's Eleven a giddy pleasure, the follow-up's less aggressive approach matches the relaxed confidence of the movie's European adventure."

== Chart performance ==
Weekly chart positions for Ocean's Twelve (Music from and Inspired by the Motion Picture)
Chart (2004–2005)	Peak position
French Albums (SNEP)	101
US Soundtrack Albums (Billboard)	13

== Personnel ==
Credits adapted from liner notes:

- Music composer, producer and supervisor – David Holmes
- Programming – Stephen Hilton
- Recording and mixing – Hugo Nicolson
- Music coordinator – Rochelle Sharpe
- Executive producer – Diarmuid Quinn, Tom Whalley
- Music consultant – Frankie Pine
- Graphics and design – Lawrence Azerrad
- Drums – Zach Danziger
- Percussion – Hugo Nicholson, Zach Danziger
