= 199Quad =

Studio album by 69 Boyz
- Released: May 31, 1994
- Recorded: 1993–94
- Studio: The Bass Station (Orlando, FL)
- Genre: Hip hop; Miami bass
- Length: 1:13:39
- Label: Rip-It
- Producer: 95 South

69 Boyz chronology
| 199Quad (1994) | The Wait Is Over (1998) |

Singles from 199Quad
- 1. "Tootsee Roll" Released: May 27, 1994; 2. "Kitty Kitty" Released: September 18, 1994

Professional ratings
Review scores
| Source | Rating |
|---|---|
| AllMusic | 4/5 stars |

199Quad is the debut studio album by American Miami bass group 69 Boyz. It was released in 1994 through Rip-It Records. The recording sessions took place at the Bass Station in Orlando, Florida and was produced by 95 South. It features guest appearances from 95 South, Big Tyme and Booty Man. The album reached number 59 on the Billboard 200 and was certified platinum by the Recording Industry Association of America on July 11, 1995, for selling 1,000,000 copies. The album spawned two charted singles: "Tootsee Roll" and "Kitty Kitty", which made it to the Billboard Hot 100 peaking at No. 8 and No. 51 respectively.

== Track listing ==
All tracks are written by Da S.W.A.T. Team (Jay McGowan and Van Bryant).

| No. | Title | Length |
|---|---|---|
| 1. | "Land 69" | 1:07 |
| 2. | "Caller #10" | 0:47 |
| 3. | "Da Train" | 4:29 |
| 4. | "Loose Booty" | 4:07 |
| 5. | "Kitty Kitty" | 4:10 |
| 6. | "Puddin Tame" | 3:29 |
| 7. | "Da Set" | 2:25 |
| 8. | "Hennessy" (featuring Booty Man) | 1:37 |
| 9. | "Survival of da Fittest" | 5:55 |
| 10. | "Hump N' Ya Back" | 2:58 |
| 11. | "Get Together" | 3:53 |
| 12. | "Tootsee Roll" | 4:18 |
| 13. | "Da Mote" | 4:33 |
| 14. | "Ding Dong Song" (featuring 95 South) | 4:10 |
| 15. | "Teenie Weenie" | 3:05 |
| 16. | "10 Chicken Wangs and a Bottle of Dom" | 3:24 |
| 17. | "Ease on Down da Road" | 4:57 |
| 18. | "Booty Drop" | 3:26 |
| 19. | "All Men R Dawgs" (featuring Big Tyme) | 3:06 |
| 20. | "Buddy-Buddy" | 3:53 |
| 21. | "Tootsee Roll" (Dance Version) | 4:21 |
| Total length: | | 1:13:39 |

== Charts ==
=== Weekly charts ===
| Chart (1994–1995) | Peak position |
|---|---|
| US Billboard 200 | 59 |
| US Top R&B/Hip-Hop Albums (Billboard) | 13 |
| US Heatseekers Albums (Billboard) | 1 |

=== Year-end charts ===
| Chart (1994) | Position |
|---|---|
| US Top R&B/Hip-Hop Albums (Billboard) | 55 |

| Chart (1995) | Position |
|---|---|
| US Billboard 200 | 111 |
| US Top R&B/Hip-Hop Albums (Billboard) | 54 |

== Certifications ==
| Region | Certification | Certified units/sales |
|---|---|---|
| United States (RIAA) | Platinum | 1,000,000^{^} |
^{^} Shipments figures based on certification alone.
