= Space Jam (soundtrack) =

1996 soundtrack album by various artists

Space Jam: Music from and Inspired by the Motion Picture

Soundtrack album by various artists
- Released: November 12, 1996
- Recorded: 1995–1996
- Genres: R&B; hip hop; pop
- Length: 65:16
- Labels: Warner Sunset; Atlantic
- Producers: R. Kelly; Rashad Smith; Ken Ross; Craig Kallman; Dominique Trenier

Singles from Space Jam: Music from and Inspired by the Motion Picture
- 1. "Fly Like an Eagle" Released: October 22, 1996; 2. "Hit 'Em High (The Monstars' Anthem)" Released: November 1996; 3. "I Believe I Can Fly" Released: November 26, 1996; 4. "Space Jam" Released: December 3, 1996; 5. "For You I Will" Released: January 14, 1997; 6. "I Turn to You" Released: June 17, 1997

Space Jam: Music from and Inspired by the Motion Picture is the original soundtrack album of the 1996 film starring Michael Jordan and the Looney Tunes cast. An album featuring the film's score by James Newton Howard was also released. The soundtrack was released by Warner Sunset and Atlantic Records on November 12, 1996. A cover of the Steve Miller Band's "Fly Like an Eagle" by Seal was first released on the soundtrack.

== Reception ==
Professional ratings
Review scores
Source	Rating
AllMusic	3/5 stars
Billboard	(favorable)
Entertainment Weekly	B−

The soundtrack peaked at No. 2 on the US Billboard 200 on the week ending April 5, 1997, behind Aerosmith's Nine Lives. It was certified double platinum in January 1997. In 2001, the soundtrack was certified 6× platinum.

== Track listing ==
No.	Title	Writer(s)	Producer(s)	Length
1.	"Fly Like an Eagle" (Seal)	Steve Miller	Seal; Rashad Smith^{[a]}	4:13
2.	"The Winner" (Coolio)	Artis Ivey, Jr.; Brian Dobbs; Curtis Mayfield	Brian Dobbs "The Wino"	4:00
3.	"Space Jam" (Quad City DJ's)	Johnny McGowan; Nathaniel Orange; Van Bryant	Jay "Ski" McGowan; C.C. Lemonhead; Thrill da Playa^{[c]}	5:04
4.	"I Believe I Can Fly" (R. Kelly)	Robert Kelly	R. Kelly	5:21
5.	"Hit 'Em High (The Monstars' Anthem)" (B-Real, Busta Rhymes, Coolio, LL Cool J and Method Man)	Louis Freese; Trevor Smith; Ivey, Jr.; James Todd Smith; Clifford Smith; Jean-Claude Olivier; Samuel Barnes	The Trackmasters	4:15
6.	"I Found My Smile Again" (D'Angelo)	Michael Archer	D'Angelo	6:12
7.	"For You I Will" (Monica)	Diane Warren	David Foster	4:54
8.	"Upside Down ('Round-N-'Round)" (Salt-N-Pepa)	Bernard Edwards; Nile Rodgers; Cheryl "Salt" James; Sandra "Pepa" Denton	Rashad Smith; Armando Colon	4:13
9.	"Givin' U All That I've Got" (Robin S.)	Robin Stone; Todd Terry	Todd Terry	4:02
10.	"Basketball Jones" (Barry White and Chris Rock)	Thomas Chong; Richard "Cheech" Marin	Lou Adler; Jamey Jaz	5:37
11.	"I Turn to You" (All-4-One)	Diane Warren	Jimmy Jam and Terry Lewis	4:51
12.	"All of My Days" (R. Kelly featuring Changing Faces and Jay-Z)	Kelly	R. Kelly	3:58
13.	"That's the Way (I Like It)" (Spin Doctors featuring Biz Markie)	Harry Wayne Casey; Richard Finch	Danny Kortchmar; Peter Denenberg	3:46
14.	"Buggin'" (Bugs Bunny)	Shawn Carter; James Newton Howard	Dominique Trenier; Dominique Owen	4:14

Notes

- "The Winner", "All of My Days" and "Buggin'" do not appear in the film.
- "Upside Down ('Round-N-'Round)" contains a sample from "Upside Down" by Diana Ross.
- ^{^[a]} signifies an additional producer.
- ^{^[c]} signifies a co-producer.

== Album singles ==
Single information
"Fly Like an Eagle"
- Performed by: Seal
- Released: October 22, 1996
- Formats: CD
- Chart positions: No. 10 US; No. 13 UK; No. 61 GER
"Hit 'Em High (The Monstars' Anthem)"
- Performed by: B Real, Coolio, Method Man, LL Cool J, and Busta Rhymes
- Released: November 1996
- Formats: CD
- Chart positions: No. 8 UK; No. 50 US R&B Airplay
"I Believe I Can Fly"
- Performed by: R. Kelly
- Released: November 26, 1996
- Formats: CD, cassette
- Chart positions: No. 1 UK; No. 1 NZ; No. 2 US
"Space Jam"
- Performed by: Quad City DJ's
- Released: December 3, 1996
- Formats: CD
- Chart positions: No. 24 NZ; No. 37 US; No. 57 UK
"For You I Will"
- Performed by: Monica
- Released: January 14, 1997
- Formats: CD
- Chart positions: No. 27 UK; No. 2 NZ; No. 4 US
"I Turn to You"
- Performed by: All-4-One
- Released: June 17, 1997

== Charts ==
=== Weekly charts ===
Chart (1996–1997)	Peak position
Australian Albums (ARIA)	15
Austrian Albums (Ö3 Austria)	12
Belgian Albums (Ultratop Flanders)	17
Belgian Albums (Ultratop Wallonia)	11
Canada Top Albums/CDs (RPM)	5
Dutch Albums (Album Top 100)	5
French Albums (SNEP)	23
German Albums (Offizielle Top 100)	4
Hungarian Albums (MAHASZ)	7
New Zealand Albums (RMNZ)	6
Norwegian Albums (VG-lista)	2
Scottish Albums (Official Charts)	21
Swedish Albums (Sverigetopplistan)	8
Swiss Albums (Schweizer Hitparade)	11
UK Compilation Albums (Official Charts)	5
US Billboard 200	2
US Top R&B/Hip-Hop Albums (Billboard)	5

=== Year-end charts ===
Chart (1997)	Position
Austrian Albums (Ö3 Austria)	50
Belgian Albums (Ultratop Flanders)	72
Belgian Albums (Ultratop Wallonia)	92
Dutch Albums (Album Top 100)	22
German Albums (Offizielle Top 100)	42
Swiss Albums (Schweizer Hitparade)	37
US Billboard 200	4
US Top R&B/Hip-Hop Albums (Billboard)	15

Chart (1998)	Position
US Billboard 200	189

=== Decade-end charts ===
Chart (1990–1999)	Position
US Billboard 200	69

== Certifications ==
Region	Certification	Certified units/sales
Australia (ARIA)	Gold	35,000^{^}
Belgium (BRMA)	Gold	25,000^{*}
Canada (Music Canada)	2× Platinum	200,000^{^}
Japan (RIAJ)	Gold	100,000^{^}
Netherlands (NVPI)	Gold	50,000^{^}
Norway (IFPI Norway)	Gold	25,000^{*}
Poland (ZPAV)	Gold	50,000^{*}
Spain (Promusicae)	Gold	50,000^{^}
United Kingdom (BPI)	Gold	100,000^{^}
United States (RIAA)	6× Platinum	6,000,000^{^}
^{*} Sales figures based on certification alone.^{^} Shipments figures based on certification alone.
