= Whoot, There It Is =

Single by 95 South

from the album Quad City Knock
- Released: March 23, 1993
- Recorded: 1993
- Genre: Hip hop; Miami bass
- Length: 3:04
- Label: Wrap
- Songwriters: C.C. Lemonhead; Jay Ski
- Producer: The Bass Mechanics

95 South singles chronology
"Whoot, There It Is" (1993)	"Hump wit It" (1993)

"Whoot, There It Is" is a song by American hip hop group 95 South, released in March 1993, by label Wrap, as the lead single from debut album, Quad City Knock (1993). It was produced and written by C.C. Lemonhead and Jay Ski (the Bass Mechanics), the production duo who were responsible for several other popular Miami bass acts including the 69 Boyz, Quad City DJs and Dis-n-Dat. The Bass Mechanics also produced "Whoot, Here It Is", released by Dis-n-Dat. "Whoot, There It Is" peaked at No. 11 on the US Billboard Hot 100, while also receiving a platinum certification from the RIAA for sales of one million copies on July 28, 1993.

== Controversy ==
After 95 South released "Whoot, There It Is", a similar song, "Whoomp! (There It Is)", was released by the duo Tag Team.

95 South claims that their song was stolen by Tag Team.

== Music video ==
Charles Aaron from Spin commented on the music video for "Whoot, There It Is", "A classic of the genre—tailgate party gone buck-wild. Priceless telephone pole routine."

== Track listing ==
1. "Whoot, There It Is" (club version)- 6:05
2. "Whoot, There It Is" (radio version)- 4:26
3. "Hump wit It" (club mix)- 6:14
4. "Whoot, There It Is" (album version)- 3:05

== Charts ==
=== Weekly charts ===
Chart (1993)	Peak position
Canada Retail Singles (The Record)	1
Canada Dance/Urban (RPM)	5
US Billboard Hot 100	11
US Hot R&B Singles (Billboard)	7
US Hot Rap Singles (Billboard)	3
US Hot Dance Music/Maxi-Singles Sales (Billboard)	12
US Rhythmic Top 40 (Billboard)	27
US Cash Box Top 100	13

=== Year-end charts ===
Chart (1993)	Position
Canada Dance/Urban (RPM)	50
US Billboard Hot 100	44
US Cash Box Top 100	39
