= Tightwork 3000 =

Studio album by 95 South
- Released: September 12, 2000
- Recorded: 2000
- Genre: Hip hop, Southern rap, Miami bass
- Length: 57:42
- Label: RCA
- Producer: 95 South, Jayski

95 South chronology
| One Mo' 'Gen (1995) | Tightwork 3000 (2000) |

Professional ratings
Review scores
| Source | Rating |
|---|---|
| AllMusic | 1.5/5 stars |
| The Encyclopedia of Popular Music | 2/5 stars |
| The San Diego Union-Tribune | 2.5/4 stars |
| Vibe | 2.5/5 stars |

Tightwork 3000 is the third album by the Southern rap group 95 South, released in 2000. It was a commercial failure. Two singles, "Tightwork" and "Wet-n-Wild", were released but failed to chart.

== Production ==
The album was produced by 95 South's Daddy Black and AB, with help from Jayski. It was recorded in Jacksonville and Orlando.

== Critical reception ==
The Oklahoman wrote: "The lyrics become redundant, and the beats fuse into a monotone. Perhaps AB and Daddy Black should go back to doing what they're talented at the most—producing remixes for other artists." The Austin Chronicle thought that "the wet 'n' wild Orlando collective's bass-quakin' big-booty thump is tighter than a string bikini and more refreshing than an open fridge." Billboard called the title track "fun-loving" and praised the "infectious bassline and the catchy hook."

== Track listing ==
| No. | Title | Length |
|---|---|---|
| 1. | "Tightwork" | 4:17 |
| 2. | "Wet-n-Wild" | 3:40 |
| 3. | "Everything Fre" | 1:20 |
| 4. | "Boon-Key Drop" | 3:51 |
| 5. | "Tightwork (Dat's Dat SSHHH)" | 4:33 |
| 6. | "Hooked" | 3:46 |
| 7. | "Don't Call Me" | 3:22 |
| 8. | "Like So" | 3:54 |
| 9. | "Ms. Got Dat Booty" | 4:00 |
| 10. | "Down Low" | 3:25 |
| 11. | "Wrong Place, Wrong Time" | 4:25 |
| 12. | "Friday Night" | 1:24 |
| 13. | "Dr. Boom" | 4:00 |
| 14. | "Cool Ade" (Extended Mix) | 5:09 |
| 15. | "Trickin' 2nite" | 4:38 |
| 16. | "Bass Check II" | 1:58 |
