= Ed Bernard =

American actor (1939–2026)

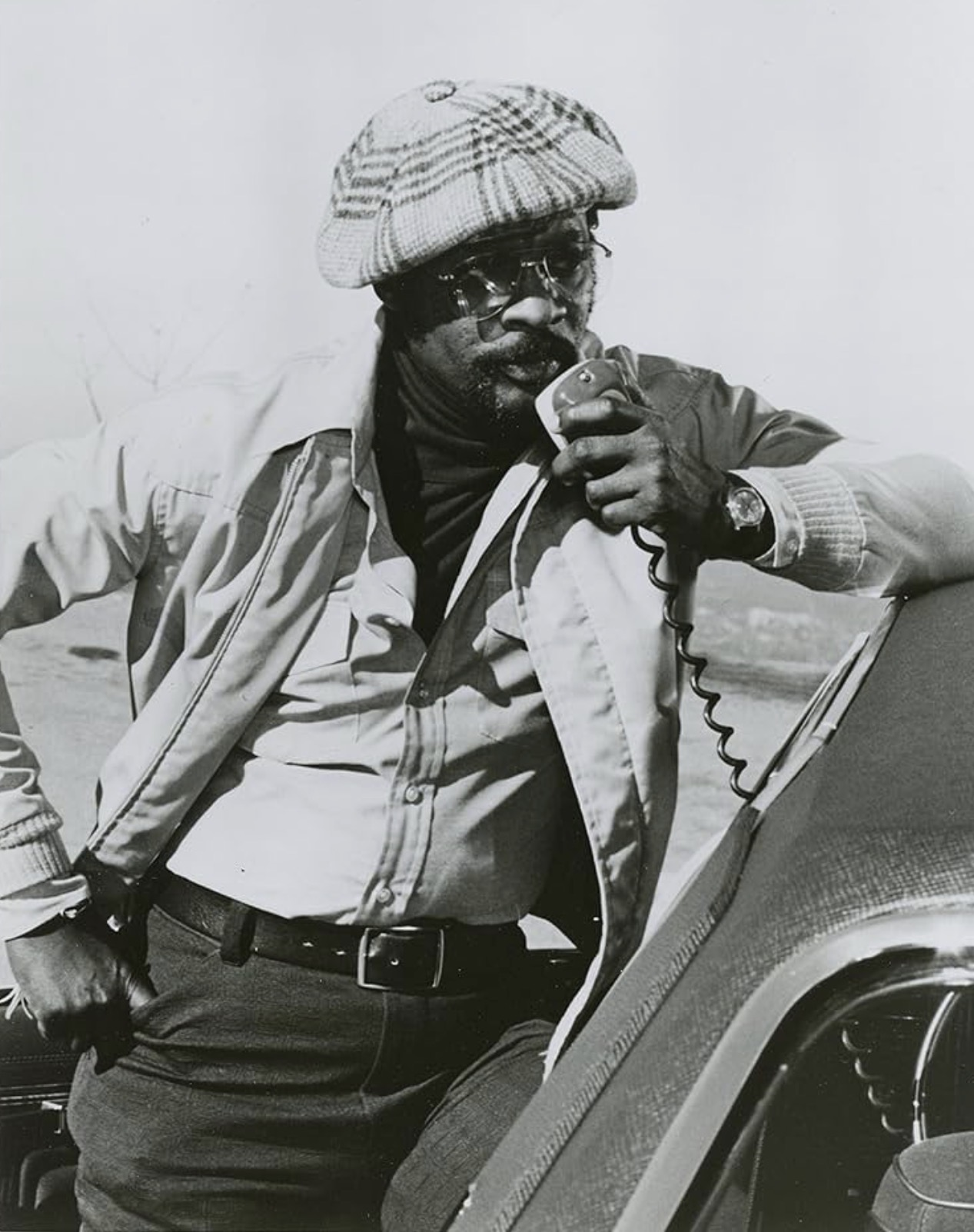
- Bernard in Police Woman, 1976
- Born: Edward Bernard; July 4, 1939; Philadelphia, Pennsylvania, U.S.
- Died: January 23, 2026 (aged 86); Northridge, California, U.S.
- Occupation: Actor
- Years active: 1971–2005

Edward Bernard (July 4, 1939 – January 23, 2026) was an American actor. He was best known for his roles as Detective Joe Styles on Police Woman, Principal Jim Willis on The White Shadow, and as Lieutenant Bill Giles on Hardcastle and McCormick.

Bernard died in Northridge, Los Angeles on January 23, 2026, at the age of 86. At the 98th Academy Awards, his name was mentioned in the In Memoriam section.

== Selected filmography ==
- Shaft (1971) as Peerce
- The Hot Rock (1972) as Cop
- Across 110th Street (1972) as Joe Logart
- Trader Horn (1973) as Apague
- Love Story (1973), episode "A Glow of Dying Embers" as Peter
- Police Story (1973–1974) various roles
- That's My Mama (1974) as Earl Chambers #1, Mailman (first 2 episodes only)
- Mannix (1974) (TV series) as Bull Evans
- Kojak (1974) (TV series) as Cleveland Watson
- Together Brothers (1974) as Mr. Kool
- Police Woman (1974–1978) as Det. Joe Styles
- What's Happening!! (1978) as Ed Roberts
- Mork & Mindy (1978) (TV series) as Officer Boyd
- The White Shadow (1978–1980) (TV series) as Jim Willis
- T.J. Hooker (1982–1984) (TV series) as Lt. Tom Reed / Willis
- Blue Thunder (1983) as Sgt. Short
- Hardcastle and McCormick (TV series) (1984–1985) as Lt. Bill Giles
- Under Cover (1987) as Chief Heffer
- Homeward Bound: The Incredible Journey (1993) as Desk Sergeant
- Girl in the Cadillac (1995) as Judge Horton
- Pinocchio's Revenge (1996) as Jail Guard
- NYPD Blue (1999) (TV series - episode: "Voir Dire This") as Judge Sheegmuller
- Becker (2003) (TV series) as Evans
- ER (2005) (TV series) as Mr. Klossey
- Cold Case (2005) (TV series) as Donald Williams
