= Woof Woof =

1998 single by 69 Boyz

Single by 69 Boyz

from the album The Wait Is Over
- Released: 1998
- Genre: Hip hop, Southern hip hop, Miami bass
- Length: 4:31
- Label: Big Beat
- Songwriter: Valerie Bryant
- Producers: J. Nash, K. Mills, Thrill Da Playa

69 Boyz singles chronology
"Hoop N Yo Face" (1996)	"Woof Woof" (1998)	"Get on Your Feet" (1998)

Music video
- "Woof Woof" on YouTube

"Woof Woof" is a song by American hip hop group 69 Boyz and the lead single from their second studio album The Wait Is Over (1998). It peaked at number 31 on the Billboard Hot 100 and was featured on the soundtrack to the 1998 film Dr. Dolittle.

== Critical reception ==
Vice included the song in their ranking of 74 Jock Jams, commenting "This is either a poor man's 'Whoomp! There It Is' or a rich man's 'Who Let the Dogs Out?'"

== Charts ==
Chart (1998)	Peak position
US Billboard Hot 100	31
US Hot R&B/Hip-Hop Songs (Billboard)	24
US Hot Rap Songs (Billboard)	2
