= Hit 'Em High (The Monstars' Anthem) =

1996 single by B-Real, Coolio, Method Man, LL Cool J and Busta Rhymes

Single by B-Real, Coolio, Method Man, LL Cool J and Busta Rhymes

from the album Space Jam: Music from and Inspired by the Motion Picture
- Released: November 1996
- Genre: Hip hop
- Length: 4:17
- Label: Atlantic
- Songwriters: Artis Ivey Jr.; Clifford Smith; James Todd Smith; Louis Freese; Jean Claude Olivier; Samuel Barnes; Trevor Smith
- Producer: Trackmasters

B-Real singles chronology
"Boom Biddy Bye Bye" (1996)	"Hit 'Em High (The Monstars' Anthem)" (1996)	"Men of Steel" (1997)

Coolio singles chronology
"Keep It on the Red Light" (1996)	"Hit 'Em High (The Monstars' Anthem)" (1996)	"The Winner" (1997)

Method Man singles chronology
"Wu-Wear: The Garment Renaissance" (1996)	"Hit 'Em High (The Monstars' Anthem)" (1996)	"4, 3, 2, 1" (1997)

LL Cool J singles chronology
"This Is for the Lover in You" (1996)	"Hit 'Em High (The Monstars' Anthem)" (1996)	"Ain't Nobody" (1997)

Busta Rhymes singles chronology
"Wild for da Night" (1997)	"Hit 'Em High (The Monstars' Anthem)" (1996)	"Rumble in the Jungle" (1997)

Space Jam singles chronology
"Fly Like an Eagle" (1996)	"Hit 'Em High (The Monstars' Anthem)" (1996)	"I Believe I Can Fly" (1996)

"Hit 'Em High (The Monstars' Anthem)" is a single performed by American rappers B-Real, Coolio, Method Man, LL Cool J, and Busta Rhymes from the soundtrack to the 1996 film, Space Jam. Though the song failed to enter the US Billboard Hot 100, it was successful in Europe, reaching number one in Norway and number eight in the United Kingdom. The music video, directed by Hype Williams, is in black and white and features scenes from the movie, mostly the Monstars. The rappers wore the Monstars' jerseys from the movie while rapping on a basketball court.

== Track listing ==
A1. "Hit 'Em High (The Monstars' Anthem)" (extended mix) – 4:41
A2. "Hit 'Em High" (Extended Track Masters remix) – 4:23
B1. "Hit 'Em High" (original instrumental) – 4:16
B2. "Hit 'Em High" (Track Masters remix instrumental) – 4:21

== Personnel ==
- Produced, mixed and drum programming by Poke and Tone.
- Mix engineer: Bill Esses at Chung King Studios
- Recorded at Encore Studios and the Hit Factory.

== Charts ==
=== Weekly charts ===
Weekly chart performance for "Hit 'Em High (The Monstars' Anthem)"
Chart (1997)	Peak position
Belgium (Ultratop 50 Flanders)	35
Belgium (Ultratop 50 Wallonia)	14
Europe (Eurochart Hot 100)	20
France (SNEP)	38
Germany (GfK)	14
Ireland (IRMA)	8
Netherlands (Dutch Top 40)	4
Netherlands (Single Top 100)	5
New Zealand (Recorded Music NZ)	17
Norway (VG-lista)	1
Sweden (Sverigetopplistan)	10
Switzerland (Schweizer Hitparade)	11
UK Singles (OCC)	8

=== Year-end charts ===
Year-end chart performance for "Hit 'Em High (The Monstars' Anthem)"
Chart (1997)	Position
Belgium (Ultratop 50 Wallonia)	86
Europe (Eurochart Hot 100)	90
Germany (Media Control)	79
Netherlands (Dutch Top 40)	47
Netherlands (Single Top 100)	82
Sweden (Topplistan)	71
UK Singles (OCC)	148
