= I Believe I Can Fly =

1996 single by R. Kelly

Single by R. Kelly

from the album Space Jam: Music from and Inspired by the Motion Picture
- Released: November 26, 1996
- Studio: Battery (Chicago, Illinois)
- Genre: R&B; soul; gospel
- Length: 5:20 (album version); 4:42 (radio edit)
- Label: Jive; Atlantic
- Songwriter: Robert Kelly
- Producer: R. Kelly

R. Kelly singles chronology
"I Can't Sleep Baby (If I)" (1996)	"I Believe I Can Fly" (1996)	"Gotham City" (1997)

Space Jam singles chronology
"Hit 'Em High (The Monstars' Anthem)" (1996)	"I Believe I Can Fly" (1996)	"Space Jam" (1996)

"I Believe I Can Fly"
R. Kelly's "I Believe I Can Fly" from R.

"I Believe I Can Fly" is a song written, produced, and performed by the American singer R. Kelly from the soundtrack to the 1996 film Space Jam. It was originally released on November 26, 1996, and was later included on Kelly's 1998 album R. In early 1997, "I Believe I Can Fly" reached number two on the Billboard Hot 100. It also reached the number-one spot of the Billboard R&B Singles Chart and remained there for six non-consecutive weeks. Internationally, "I Believe I Can Fly" topped the charts in eight countries, including Ireland, the Netherlands, New Zealand, Switzerland, and the United Kingdom.

The song won three awards from five nominations at the 40th Annual Grammy Awards: Best Male R&B Vocal Performance, Best R&B Song, and Best Song Written for Visual Media, while losing Song of the Year and Record of the Year. It was ranked number 406 on Rolling Stone's list of the 500 Greatest Songs of All Time in 2004. The accompanying music video was directed by Kelly with Hype Williams and designed by visual artist and designer Ron Norsworthy.

== Background and composition ==
In a 2013 interview with The Boombox, R. Kelly was asked about the creative process behind the song: "When I met Michael Jordan on a basketball court at an athletic club — we hooped together in Chicago — he came to me and asked me if I wanted to do a song for his upcoming movie," Kelly said. "I was like, 'Yeah!' I didn't even ask what it was. [Eventually] he let me know what it was, we went to a screening to watch it and that's when I ended up coming up with 'I Believe I Can Fly'. I knew from the first melody that was gonna be the song that was gonna take me out of R&B and into another genre of music." "I Believe I Can Fly" has a moderately slow tempo of 60 beats per minute, based on 4/4 common time, while composed in the key of C major (with a key change to D♭ major). Kelly's vocals on the track ranges from the low note of E_{3} to the high note of A♭_{4}.

== Critical reception ==
A writer for Associated Press described the song as "majestic" and "gospel-styled", noting that "hearing R. Kelly's booming voice reach a crescendo while backed up by a choir is a rousing performance that will get many replays". Larry Flick from Billboard magazine wrote that it is "highly inspirational" and "embodying the mind-set of the two superstars [Michael Jordan and R. Kelly]". He added, "If I can dream it, I can achieve it. A great motivator for the children who will flock to the silver screen for Jordan". A reviewer from Chicago Sun-Times named it a "warm anthem".

Ross Scarano from Complex said, "Like it or not, R. Kelly's 'I Believe I Can Fly' works because of R. Kelly. There's not another singer alive with the same combination of ability, earnest conviction, and personal demons—demons that Kelly believes he needs the listener's support to fight." He added that the singer "calls on strings and a choir and every bit of strength available in his lungs and vocal chords to rise above the broad struggle described in the lyrics." David Browne from Entertainment Weekly opined that the "go-for-it lyrics and florid orchestration seem to have been written with a future Disney musical in mind."

Tom Ewing of Freaky Trigger noted "I Believe I Can Fly"'s "genuine power as a redemption song" and also called it "the most convincing self-help song". British newspaper Lennox Herald named it the "undoubted highlight" of the Space Jam album". Thessa Mooji from Music & Media described it as a "dramatic ballad". Music Week rated it three out of five, calling it "a smoochy gospel-tinged ballad". The reviewer added, "A huge hit in the US and should ignite here."

People Magazine labeled it as "schmaltzy but potent". Sunday Mirror gave it a full score of five out of ten, writing, "I believe I can soar sings R. Kelly but I suppose we should be thankful that he's released a proper song for once instead of those awful rap cover versions which are clogging up the charts these days. It's taken from the film Space Jam and if you bought Toni Braxton's last single and liked The Bodyguard then you will buy this for sure. I believe it will fly to the top of the charts though it makes me sore to say it." James L. Brown from USC Today deemed it a "long slow ballad".

== Impact and legacy ==
In 2004, Rolling Stone ranked "I Believe I Can Fly" number 406 on their list of the 500 Greatest Songs of All Time. In 2012, Complex placed the song at number 24 in their ranking of The Best 90s R&B Songs.

== Music video ==
The music video for "I Believe I Can Fly" was directed by Hype Williams. It begins at an old farm, where a young boy is playing with his ball. By the farm lies an autumn yellow cornfield, where R. Kelly starts singing. In another scene, a large screen by the farm is showing clips from Space Jam, while Kelly performs on the ground. Later in the video, the singer sits in an autumn forest. Behind him is the screen where the film's clips are displayed. In the last part of the video, Kelly conducts a large choir in a sports hall, accompanied by an orchestra. After Kelly has sung the last stanzas of the song, the choir claps as the video ends.

The official music video was published to YouTube in October 2013, where it remained until the termination of his channel in October 2021.

== Track listing ==
7-inch single, US (1996)
No.	Title	Length
1.	"I Believe I Can Fly"	4:42
2.	"Religious Love"	4:12

12-inch single, US (1996)
No.	Title	Length
1.	"I Believe I Can Fly" (LP Version)	5:20
2.	"I Believe I Can Fly" (Radio Edit)	4:42
3.	"I Believe I Can Fly" (Instrumental)	5:20
4.	"Religious Love"	4:12
5.	"I Can't Sleep Baby (If I)" (Remix Street Version)	4:01

CD single, UK & Europe (1996)
No.	Title	Length
1.	"I Believe I Can Fly" (Radio Edit)	4:42
2.	"I Believe I Can Fly" (LP Version)	5:20
3.	"I Believe I Can Fly" (Instrumental)	5:20
4.	"Religious Love"	4:12

== Personnel ==
- Produced and arranged by R. Kelly
- Recorded by Stephen George at Battery Studios, Chicago
- Assistant recording engineers: Chris Brickley and Rick Behrens
- String Orchestra recorded by Carl Robinson at United Sound Systems – Studio A, Detroit
- Mixed by R. Kelly and Stephen George at Chicago Recording Co.
- Assistant mix engineer: Ron Lowe
- Programmed by R. Kelly and Stephen George
- Lead vocals: R. Kelly
- Background vocals: The Luv Club Choir, directed by Percy Bady
- Keyboard: Percy Bady
- Strings: Paul Riser and The Motown Romance Orchestra, led by Hart Hollman
- Executive producer: Barry Hankerson

== In film and television ==
Other than appearing on the soundtrack for the film Space Jam, "I Believe I Can Fly" was performed by the school band in the 2002 film Drumline during the high school graduation ceremony of Devon Miles (played by Nick Cannon).

- In the 2006 Ice Age animated sequel film Ice Age 2: The Meltdown, by 20th Century Fox and Blue Sky Studios, Crash the possum (voiced by Seann William Scott) briefly sings the song after Manny the woolly mammoth (voiced by Ray Romano) catapults him with a tree before he crashes into another.
- In the 2003 film Good Boy!, Wilson briefly sings the song while diving into a pool.
- In the first-season episode of the television series Da Ali G Show, Ali G performs the song during the opening skit.
- In the 2005 comedy Fun with Dick and Jane, Jim Carrey sings along with the song as it is played in an elevator.
- This song also appeared on the first American season of The X Factor, where R. Kelly performed "I Believe I Can Fly" for the first time as a duet with the eventual winner of the show is Melanie Amaro.
- This song was also performed on the singing competition series The Voice as the last solo song for the Season 2 winner Jermaine Paul.
- In the Fox musical television series Glee, performed a version of the song in episode fourteen of season three, "On My Way" (aired on February 21, 2012). It is a mash-up track with the song "Fly" by Nicki Minaj featuring Rihanna.
- In the comedy's third installment The Hangover Part III, Leslie Chow sings a 12-second portion of the song, while parachuting through Las Vegas.
- In Red Velvet's Level Up Project, Wendy Shon sang the chorus while parasailing and riding on a speed boat in Pattaya, Thailand. She also sang the chorus in Level Up Project 2 in 2017-2018 and in Battle Trip's Episode 103 while paragliding in Krems an der Donau, Austria.

== Other performances ==
Kelly performed this song at the 40th Annual Grammy Awards.

In The TP-2.com Tour, Kelly performed a 10-minute long remix of "I Believe I Can Fly," which included dialogue from a priest, Kelly's mother, and God as characters. The remix was later featured on the bootleg release Loveland.

STS-122 crew heard this song on flight day 10 as a wake up call.

Since its release, it has become commonly associated with the NBA, most notably with Michael Jordan. The song also played at the conclusion of NBC's broadcast of the 1997 NBA Finals.

In addition to the NBA, the song also found use at other sporting events, most notably at Major League Baseball's New York Yankees home games during their four consecutive World Series runs from 1998 to 2001, the first three of which they won. Also was used in the NFL for the Atlanta Falcons during their pregame in the late 1990s - early 2000s.

A version of the song, recorded by the Halifax community choir, was used as the backing track to a 2012 UK TV advertisement for the Halifax Bank.

On October 13, 2012, when the Space Shuttle Endeavour was being transferred from Los Angeles International Airport to the California Science Center through the streets of Los Angeles, the recording was played as the shuttle left The Forum, and the song was performed live by James Ingram later that day at Debbie Allen's live show celebrating the Endeavour's arrival at the corner of Crenshaw Blvd and Martin Luther King Blvd. (The shuttle was delayed over five hours in arriving there; to keep the crowd entertained, the performance went on only slightly delayed.)

== Parodies ==
- In the 1999 episode "The Best of Both Worlds" of the Nickelodeon animated television series KaBlam!, in the Life with Loopy segment, the song was spoofed - in name only - as "I (Don't) Believe I Can Fly."
- In the 2012 episode "Food Battle 2012" of the webseries Smosh, the song was spoofed as "I Believe I’m Able to Fly." It also appeared on the 2015 episode "EVERY CAT EVER".
- In 2013, the song was parodied by sports radio show Tim & Sid, spoofing the song as "I Believe in Masai", in reference to Toronto Raptors General Manager Masai Ujiri.
- In 2016, the song was parodied as "I'm Convinced I Can Swim" by "Art Smelly" from the soundtrack to the hit film Earth Jelly in an episode of Unbreakable Kimmy Schmidt.

== Charts ==
=== Weekly charts ===
Chart (1996–1997)	Peak position
Australia (ARIA)	24
Austria (Ö3 Austria Top 40)	2
Belgium (Ultratop 50 Flanders)	8
Belgium (Ultratop 50 Wallonia)	5
Canada Top Singles (RPM)	34
Canada Adult Contemporary (RPM)	34
Denmark (IFPI)	4
Europe (Eurochart Hot 100)	1
France (SNEP)	17
Germany (GfK)	3
Iceland (Íslenski Listinn Topp 40)	8
Ireland (IRMA)	1
Israel (Israeli Singles Chart)	9
Netherlands (Dutch Top 40)	1
Netherlands (Single Top 100)	2
New Zealand (Recorded Music NZ)	1
Norway (VG-lista)	2
Scottish Singles Sales (Official Charts)	4
Sweden (Sverigetopplistan)	11
Switzerland (Schweizer Hitparade)	1
UK Singles (Official Charts)	1
UK Dance (Official Charts)	16
UK Indie (Music Week)	1
UK Hip Hop/R&B (Official Charts)	1
US Billboard Hot 100	2
US Adult Contemporary (Billboard)	3
US Adult Pop Airplay (Billboard)	21
US Dance Singles Sales (Billboard)	3
US Hot R&B/Hip-Hop Songs (Billboard)	1
US Pop Airplay (Billboard)	9
US Rhythmic Airplay (Billboard)	5

=== Year-end charts ===
Chart (1996)	Position
US Top 40/Rhythm-Crossover (Billboard)	84

Chart (1997)	Position
Austria (Ö3 Austria Top 40)	10
Belgium (Ultratop 50 Flanders)	45
Belgium (Ultratop 50 Wallonia)	29
Europe (Eurochart Hot 100)	11
France (SNEP)	57
Germany (Media Control)	14
Netherlands (Dutch Top 40)	12
Netherlands (Single Top 100)	25
New Zealand (RIANZ)	38
Romania (Romanian Top 100)	74
Sweden (Topplistan)	87
Switzerland (Schweizer Hitparade)	3
UK Singles (OCC)	14
US Billboard Hot 100	6
US Adult Contemporary (Billboard)	14
US Hot R&B Singles (Billboard)	7
US Maxi-Singles Sales (Billboard)	19
US Rhythmic Top 40 (Billboard)	24
US Top 40/Mainstream (Billboard)	34

=== Decade-end charts ===
Chart (1990–1999)	Position
Netherlands (Dutch Top 40)	92
US Billboard Hot 100	87

== Certifications ==
Region	Certification	Certified units/sales
Austria (IFPI Austria)	Gold	25,000^{*}
Belgium (BRMA)	Gold	25,000^{*}
France (SNEP)	Gold	250,000^{*}
Germany (BVMI)	Gold	250,000^{^}
Netherlands (NVPI)	Gold	50,000^{^}
New Zealand (RMNZ)	Gold	5,000^{*}
Norway (IFPI Norway)	Gold	
Switzerland (IFPI Switzerland)	Gold	25,000^{^}
United Kingdom (BPI)	Platinum	600,000^{^}
United States (RIAA)	Platinum	1,900,000
^{*} Sales figures based on certification alone.^{^} Shipments figures based on certification alone.

== Yolanda Adams versions ==
"I Believe I Can Fly"

Single by Yolanda Adams featuring Gerald Levert

from the album The Experience
- Released: 2001
- Recorded: 2000
- Studio: Plant Studios (Los Angeles); Digital Sounds (Houston)
- Genre: Gospel
- Length: 4:54 (studio duet; radio edit); 5:58 (studio duet; album version); 4:30 (live solo; radio edit #1); 5:05 (live solo; radio edit #2); 6:08 (live solo; album version)
- Label: Elektra
- Songwriter: Robert Kelly
- Producer: Anthony "Shep" Crawford

Yolanda Adams singles chronology
"The Things We Do" (2000)	"I Believe I Can Fly" (2001)	"Never Give Up" (2001)

"I Believe I Can Fly"

Single by Kenny G featuring Yolanda Adams

from the album At Last...The Duets Album
- Released: 2005
- Genre: Jazz
- Length: 4:14 (radio edit); 5:19
- Label: Arista
- Songwriter: Robert Kelly
- Producer: Walter Afanasieff

American gospel artist Yolanda Adams covered "I Believe I Can Fly" and released it as the lone single from her live album The Experience (2001), which won the Grammy Award for Best Contemporary R&B Gospel Album at the 44th Annual Grammy Awards. The album contains a studio version featuring Gerald Levert and a live solo recording which were both issued as singles. In 2001, she performed the song with the Nashville Super Choir at the 32nd GMA Dove Awards and in 2002 with the Soul Children of Chicago at The Concert for World Children's Day ABC TV special. In 2026, Adams' version was certified Gold in New Zealand, making it one of the best-selling gospel songs in the region.

In 2005, a cover by Kenny G featuring Adams was released as a single in 2005, from his US Gold-certified album At Last...The Duets Album (2004).

=== Weekly charts ===
Yolanda Adams featuring Gerald Levert version

Chart (2001)	Peak position
US Adult R&B Songs (Billboard)	25
US Bubbling Under R&B/Hip-Hop Songs (Billboard)	4

Kenny G featuring Yolanda Adams version

Chart (2005)	Peak position
US Adult Contemporary (Billboard)	28

=== Certifications ===
Yolanda Adams version

Region	Certification	Certified units/sales
New Zealand (RMNZ)	Gold	15,000^{‡}
^{*} Sales figures based on certification alone.^{^} Shipments figures based on certification alone.^{‡} Sales+streaming figures based on certification alone.

== See also ==
- List of number-one R&B singles of 1997 (U.S.)
- "I Admit", a 2018 song by R. Kelly of which the extended remix of "I Believe I Can Fly" was compared to
