= Space Jam =

1996 film by Joe Pytka

- Theatrical release poster
- Directed by: Joe Pytka
- Written by: Leo Benvenuti Steve Rudnick; Timothy Harris; Herschel Weingrod
- Based on: Looney Tunes by Warner Bros.
- Produced by: Ivan Reitman; Joe Medjuck; Daniel Goldberg
- Starring: Michael Jordan; Billy West; Wayne Knight; Theresa Randle; Danny DeVito
- Cinematography: Michael Chapman
- Edited by: Sheldon Kahn
- Music by: James Newton Howard
- Production companies: Warner Bros. Feature Animation; Northern Lights Entertainment; Courtside Seats Productions
- Distributed by: Warner Bros.
- Release dates: November 10, 1996 (Los Angeles); November 15, 1996 (United States)
- Running time: 87 minutes
- Country: United States
- Language: English
- Budget: $80 million
- Box office: $250.2 million

Space Jam is a 1996 American sports comedy film directed by Joe Pytka and written by Leo Benvenuti, Steve Rudnick, Timothy Harris, and Herschel Weingrod. The film, which combines live action and animation, stars basketball player Michael Jordan as himself; the live-action cast also includes Wayne Knight and Theresa Randle, while Billy West and Danny DeVito headline the voice cast. The film follows Jordan as he is brought out of retirement by the Looney Tunes characters to help them win a basketball match against invading aliens intent on enslaving them as amusement park attractions.

Space Jam premiered in Los Angeles on November 10, 1996, and was released theatrically in the United States on November 15, by Warner Bros. under its Family Entertainment label. The film received mixed reviews from critics, who were divided over its premise of combining Jordan and his profession with the Looney Tunes characters, while the technical achievements of its intertwining of live-action and animation were praised. It was a commercial success, grossing $250.2 million worldwide against an $80 million budget, becoming the highest-grossing basketball film at the time, and the tenth highest-grossing film of 1996. A stand-alone sequel, Space Jam: A New Legacy, was released twenty-five years later in 2021.

== Plot ==
In 1973, a young Michael Jordan tells his father, James, about his dreams of playing in the NBA. Twenty years later, following James' death, Jordan retires from basketball to pursue a career in baseball.

In outer space, amusement park Moron Mountain is in decline. Its proprietor, Mr. Swackhammer, learns of the Looney Tunes from the Nerdlucks, his quintet of alien minions, and orders them to abduct the Tunes to serve as attractions. The Nerdlucks enter the Tunes' universe via a portal hidden in the center of the Earth and hold them hostage before Bugs Bunny convinces them to allow the Tunes to defend themselves. The Tunes take advantage of the Nerdlucks' small stature and challenge them to a basketball game. After seeing a documentary about basketball, the Nerdlucks infiltrate various NBA games, stealing the talents of Charles Barkley, Shawn Bradley, Patrick Ewing, Larry Johnson, and Muggsy Bogues. They use these talents to transform into hulking and adept versions of themselves known as the "Monstars".

Deciding they need help, the Looney Tunes pull Jordan into their universe as he golfs with Bill Murray, Larry Bird, and Jordan's assistant, Stan Podolak, where Bugs explains their situation to Jordan. However, Jordan is initially reluctant to help, but later agrees after a confrontation with the Monstars, and forms the "Tune Squad" with the Tunes; they are joined by Lola Bunny, with whom Bugs is enamored. To prepare himself, Jordan sends Bugs and Daffy Duck to his house to obtain his basketball gear. Jordan's children aid them and agree to keep the game a secret, while Stan, searching for Jordan, notices Bugs and Daffy, follows them to their world, and joins the team. Meanwhile, the incapacity of the five players results in a nationwide panic that culminates in the season's suspension. The players unsuccessfully try to restore their skills through various methods.

The game between the Tune Squad and the Monstars commences, with Swackhammer arriving to observe. The Monstars dominate the first half, lowering the Tune Squad's morale. During halftime, Stan surreptitiously learns how the Monstars obtained their talent and informs the Tune Squad. Disguising a bottle of water as "secret stuff", Bugs and Jordan motivate the Tune Squad, who improve in the second half using their cartoon antics. During a time-out, Jordan raises the stakes with Swackhammer: if the Tune Squad wins, the Monstars must relinquish their stolen talent, and if the Monstars win, Jordan will spend the rest of his life being Moron Mountain's newest attraction. On Swackhammer's command, the Monstars play more aggressively, injuring most of the Tune Squad.

With only ten seconds left in the game, the Tune Squad is down by one point and one player, with only Jordan, Bugs, Lola, and Daffy still able to play. Murray unexpectedly arrives and joins the team. In the final seconds, Jordan gains the ball with Murray's assistance but is pulled back by the Monstars. On Bugs' advice, Jordan uses cartoon physics to extend his arm and achieve a slam dunk, winning the game with a buzzer beater. After Swackhammer scolds the Monstars for their failure, Jordan helps them realize that they only served him because they were once smaller. Having had enough of their boss's behavior towards them, the Monstars insert Swackhammer inside a missile that sends him to the moon. After relinquishing their stolen talent, the Nerdlucks decide to join the Tunes, while Jordan and Stan return to Earth and return the talent to the five players, whose remarks convince Jordan to return to the NBA.

== Cast ==
=== Live-action ===
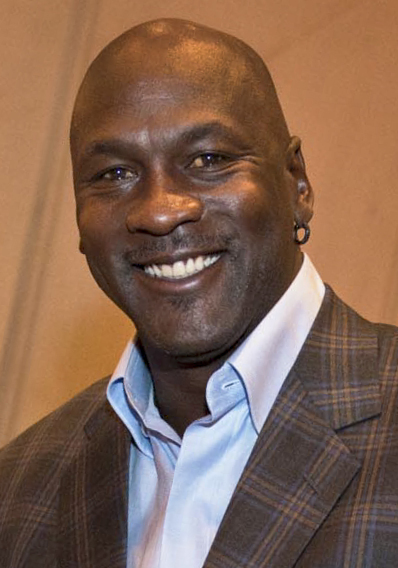
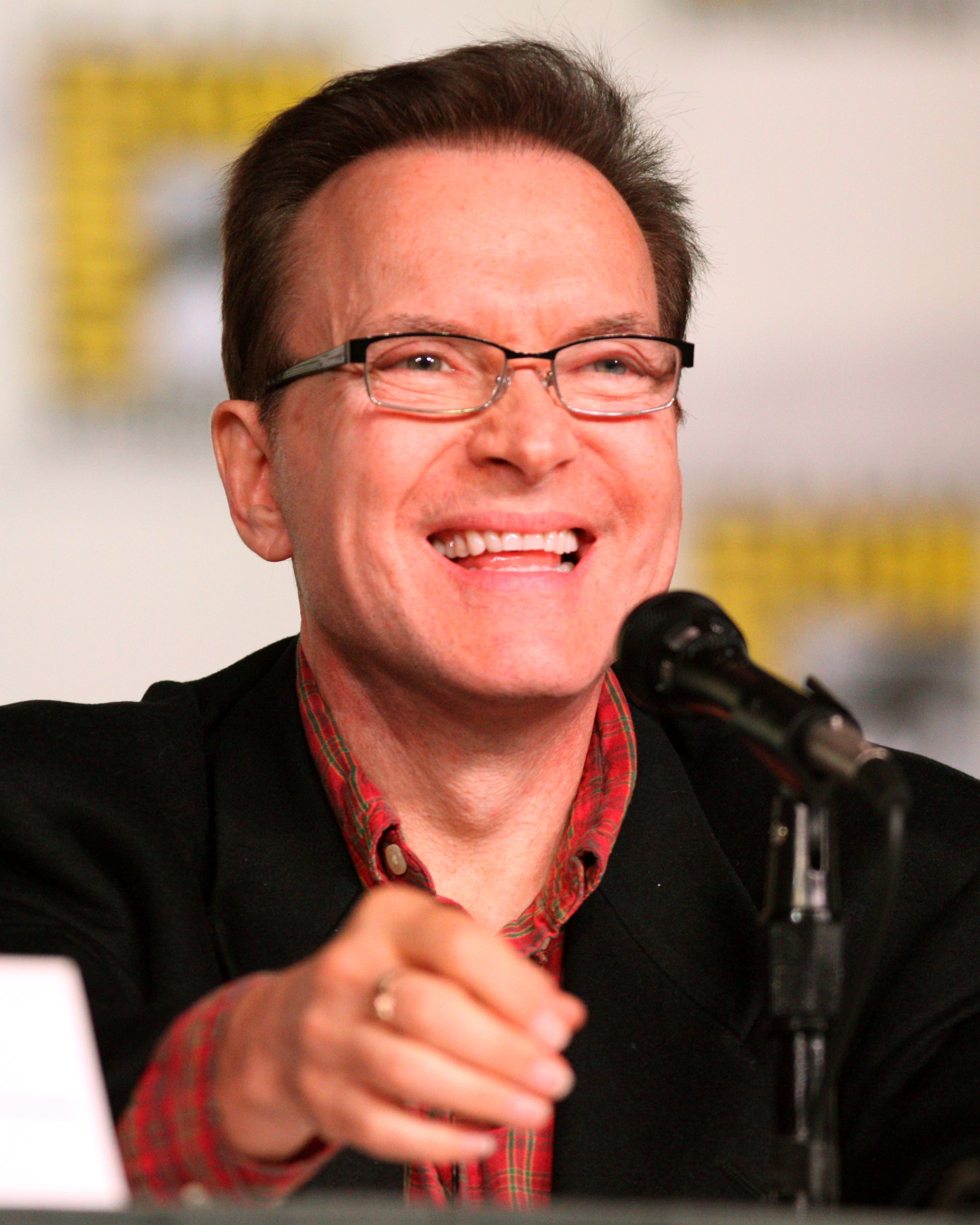
Michael Jordan (left, pictured in 2014) portrays himself in Space Jam, and Billy West provides the voice of Bugs Bunny
- Michael Jordan as himself
- Wayne Knight as Stan Podolak, a publicist and assistant who aids Jordan
- Theresa Randle as Juanita Jordan, Jordan's wife
- Charles Barkley as himself
- Muggsy Bogues as himself
- Shawn Bradley as himself
- Patrick Ewing as himself
- Larry Johnson as himself

Space Jam's cast includes Manner Washington, Eric Gordon, and Penny Bae Bridges as Jordan's children, Jeffrey, Marcus and Jasmine, respectively. Brandon Hammond plays the ten-year-old Michael Jordan. Larry Bird and Bill Murray appear as themselves, and Thom Barry portrays Jordan's father, James R. Jordan Sr. Several NBA players make cameo appearances in Space Jam, including Danny Ainge, Steve Kerr, Alonzo Mourning, Horace Grant, A.C. Green, Charles Oakley, Luc Longley, Cedric Ceballos, Derek Harper, Vlade Divac, Brian Shaw, Jeff Malone, Bill Wennington, Anthony Miller, and Sharone Wright, as do coaches Del Harris and Paul Westphal, and broadcasters Ahmad Rashad and Jim Rome. Dan Castellaneta and Patricia Heaton cameo as fans at a game between the New York Knicks and Phoenix Suns, as does Charles Hallahan as the Barons' Team Owner.

=== Voice cast ===
- Billy West as Bugs Bunny and Elmer Fudd (most scenes)
- Dee Bradley Baker as Daffy Duck, the Tasmanian Devil, and Bull
- Danny DeVito as Swackhammer, the proprietor of Moron Mountain, an intergalactic amusement park
- Bob Bergen as Porky Pig, Tweety, Marvin the Martian, Barnyard Dawg, Hubie and Bertie, and Chester the Terrier
- Bill Farmer as Sylvester, Yosemite Sam, and Foghorn Leghorn (some scenes)
- Greg Burson as Elmer Fudd (some scenes, uncredited) and Foghorn Leghorn (most scenes, uncredited)
- Maurice LaMarche as Pepé Le Pew
- June Foray as Granny and Witch Hazel (uncredited)
- Paul Julian as the Road Runner (archive recordings) (uncredited)
- Kath Soucie as Lola Bunny
- Mel Blanc as Daffy Duck on TV (archive footage) (uncredited)

The Nerdluck voices include Jocelyn Blue as their orange leader, Pound, Charity James as the dim-witted blue Blanko, June Melby as the neurotic green second-in-command Bang, Colleen Wainwright as the diminutive red Nawt, and producer Ivan Reitman's daughter, Catherine, as the eccentric purple Bupkus. Their transformed "Monstar" versions are voiced by Darnell Suttles (Pound), Steve Kehela (Blanko), Joey Camen (Bang), Dorian Harewood (Bupkus), and T.K. Carter (Nawt). Wainwright also voices Sniffles, Kehela also voices Bertie's announcer voice, and Frank Welker voices Jordan's bulldog, Charles.

== Production ==
=== Development ===
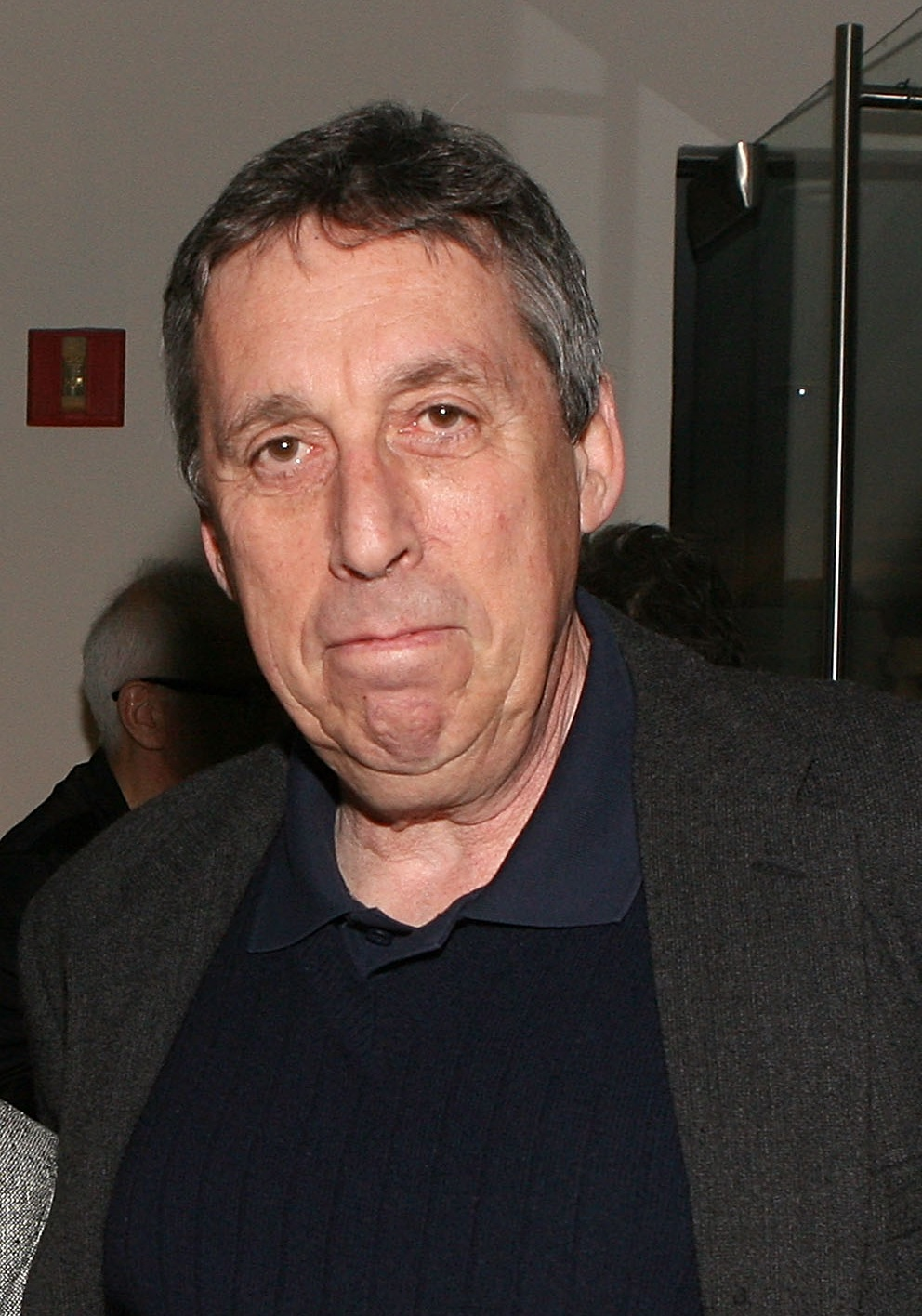
Space Jam producer Ivan Reitman in 2011. A conversation between him and a Nike executive sparked the idea of a film starring Michael Jordan and Bugs Bunny.

In 1992 and 1993, two Super Bowl Nike ads, "Hare Jordan" and "Aerospace Jordan" respectively, aired on television and featured Michael Jordan with the character Bugs Bunny. Wieden+Kennedy creative director Jim Riswold conceived the "Hare Jordan" campaign following the popularity of advertisements where Jordan played with Mars Blackmon (played by Spike Lee), a character from She's Gotta Have It (1986); he chose Bugs Bunny for his next campaign because the character was his "childhood hero." Directed by Joe Pytka, "Hare Jordan" took six months and a $1 million budget to make. It was hindered by reluctance from Warner Bros. to allow Nike to modernize Bugs' character; however, the commercial success of both ads "was a nice bit of research for Warner Bros. to understand that the Bugs character still had relevance and to tie it in with Michael," explained Pytka. This led to the company green-lighting a film featuring Jordan and Bugs, which came out of a plane meeting between a Nike executive and producer Ivan Reitman. Jordan was offered movie deals previously, but his manager, David Falk, turned them all down because he felt the basketball icon could only act as himself.

The project was closed when Jordan retired from basketball in 1993, only to be reopened in 1995 when Jordan returned as a basketball player. Falk pitched the idea to several major studios, without a story or script written. One of them was Warner Bros., which tried to create more "adult, sophisticated material" that deviated from the formula set by Disney in the animated film market. After Warner Bros. initially rejected Falk's pitch, he called the consumer products division leader, Dan Romanelli, reacting in surprise the studio would turn down a project having potential of high-selling merchandise.

Pytka was informed about the project only months before the start of principal photography; in addition to being hired as director, he also revised the script, including writing a scene where Jordan hits a home run after he returns to Earth that was filmed, but ultimately never used. Spike Lee was also interested in helping Pytka with the screenplay, but Warner Bros. blocked him from the project out of dissatisfaction from how he funded Malcolm X (1992).

=== Casting ===
Jordan initially had reservations about acting in a full-length film in contrast to doing the "Hare Jordan" and "Aerospace Jordan" commercials, which ran for 30 seconds, and did not realize how big the project was. He ultimately found the role relatable and authentic because the plot mirrored his real-life retirement from basketball, baseball career, and return to the NBA. According to Pytka, it was difficult to get most actors involved with Space Jam due to its odd premise: "I mean, they're going to work with an animated character and an athlete — are you serious? They just didn't want to do it." Before Wayne Knight was cast as Stan, his initial choices were Michael J. Fox and Chevy Chase, whom he had worked with on Doritos commercials; Warner Bros. rejected both actors. Jason Alexander also turned down the role. Nathan Lane said Pytka rejected him for the part because he appeared "too gay."

The easiest actors to obtain were the NBA players, except for Gheorghe Mureșan. Bill Murray's appearance was present in the script from the beginning, but the filmmakers were unable to book him until filming started; Murray held out until Jordan personally asked him to be in the film.

Reitman, serious about the voice actors for the established Looney Tunes characters being far better than their original voice actor, Mel Blanc, and not just replications, was very involved in the voice casting. Joe Alaskey, one of Blanc's successors since the latter's death, was put by Reitman through a set of auditions, which lasted for months until Alaskey grew tired of auditioning and backed out from the project. Bob West of Barney & Friends fame auditioned for the film, sending a tape of himself doing the Looney Tunes characters' voices. Billy West learned of Space Jam through Reitman on The Howard Stern Show, who was producing Stern's film Private Parts (1997). Reitman was impressed by West's voice talent and asked him if he could audition for Space Jam. West accepted, and after doing an audition, he landed the roles of Bugs Bunny and Elmer Fudd. Dee Bradley Baker was cast as Daffy Duck and the Tasmanian Devil due to his "convincing" improvization skills. He also recorded beeps for the Road Runner, but was replaced with archive recordings of Paul Julian for the final version. Jack Lemmon was considered for the role of Porky Pig, but Bob Bergen auditioned for the role and got the part instead. Bill Farmer was cast as Sylvester the Cat, Yosemite Sam and Foghorn Leghorn, sharing the latter role with Greg Burson; Farmer had previously voiced Sylvester for ABC Family Fun Fair, an annual stage show for disabled children in the 1980s. June Foray reprised her roles as Granny and Witch Hazel. The voice actors were not given a screenplay to work with, so they had to ad-lib the characters' lines. The casting directors originally planned several voice cameos; however, that did not work out, and Danny DeVito ended up being the only celebrity voice actor in the film, which was for Mr. Swackhammer, who was originally planned to be played by Jack Palance. Swackhammer was also planned to be a live-action character until the very final days of development, with Dennis Hopper possibly playing the role due to his friendship with Pytka.

One thing I heard was that Ivan Reitman, when they were thinking about going ahead with this movie, had phoned up Robert Zemeckis about Who Framed Roger Rabbit and asked, "Do you have any advice on what we should do to make a movie like this?" And he said, "Don't do it, it nearly killed me."

— Neil Boyle, supervising animator

=== Scale ===
The Classic Animation faction of Warner Bros., which animated the commercials and was located in Sherman Oaks, Los Angeles, was originally planned to be the only company responsible for Space Jam. However, after only a week, the animation work was so complicated that Warner Bros. contacted more studios, including reassigning the Feature Animation division in Glendale from working on Quest for Camelot (1998) to Space Jam. Ten of Classic Animation's members, including the production's animation director Tony Cervone, were taken out of the faction to become involved all throughout production, and development artists were reassigned to animating jobs, including supervising animator Bruce Woodside, who had little faith in the project: "Like so many other animators, I adore the classic Warner Bros. characters, but I really had little hope that tying them to the massive anchor of an apparently doomed marketing scheme could actually give them a successful second life in features." Other animators and artists working on the film included Chuck Gammage, Darren Vanderburg, Dave Spafford, Mark Brocking, Hiram Maxem, Mark Swan, Gary Dunn, Denis Couchon, Neil Boyle, Kirk Tingblad, Pepe Valencia, Tom McGrath, Fraser MacLean, Jacques Muller, Ashanti Miller, and Uli Meyer.

After Cervone was hired as animation director, Jerry Rees contacted Bruce W. Smith about being another animation director on the film; Rees was fired by the time Smith joined, and Pytka hired Smith to direct the animation sequences alongside Cervone. Before January 1996, when animation production was put into overdrive, none of the animators' drafts or concepts for how the film should look met with Reitman's approval; Bill Perkins joined that month as animation art director, and when first arriving at the Sherman Oaks division, "we only had around eight months to do about 52 minutes of animation" and "it was just kind of a little skeleton crew." Cervone highlighted Reitman's role as supervisor: "It started off as a string of gags with no structure, and he helped a lot with that." The drafting process involved the animators and artists using the original cartoons as references. Ultimately, they went with Bob Clampett's style of animation due to being wilder than Chuck Jones' style.

Tingblad storyboarded the scene in which Sniffles gets squashed by the Monstar Blanko, out of dislike for the character. Cervone stated, "I remember people at that time going, 'No one even knows who Sniffles is.' [But] we remember Sniffles. We've been waiting to hit Sniffles with a basketball for many years… And I do think that might be one of the reasons we're still talking about it is the movie does seem like it has this raw energy to it, chaotic energy to it in an off-kilter structure."

Production of Space Jam totaled around 19 months, with filming taking up ten of them; this was half the time of any other film of its kind according to Smith. The animation was done at a very quick pace by more than 700 workers from 18 studios in London, Canada, California and Ohio, starting January 1996 by the recently joined producers Ron Tippe and Allison Abbate. In trying to track the huge amount work done at the 18 studios, Tippe hung stills of all the shots throughout the Feature Animation faction's hallways, with completed ones marked in red.

Features about the film's production, including one from the official website, emphasized its state-of-the art computer technology when it came to its live-action/animation hybrid; "this film could have not been made two years ago," claimed Cervone in 1996. Due to its mixture of various art mediums as well as the "broad sense of humor and entertainment" unique to Looney Tunes, Smith considered Space Jam an important part of diversifying the animation industry. The film broke the record for amount of composited shots in a featured film, "roughly 1,043" according to Tippe, as well as a record number of FX shots, with around 1,100 in a single 90-minute film; Independence Day (1996), released the same year, had 700 FX shots within two hours of screen time. Tippe claimed the film would have, at most, "multiple characters, multiple levels of effects and, in some cases, up to 70 elements" in one shot.

=== Filming ===
Space Jam was one of the first-ever productions to be shot on a virtual studio. Jordan filmed in a 360-degree green screen room with motion trackers; around him were green-suited NBA players and improv actors from the Groundlings Theatre and School serving as placement identifiers for the animated characters, with a CGI background replica of a real-life setting chroma-keyed in. Although Bill Murray initially came in only to work on the golf course scene, he then wanted to be in the climactic basketball game after Pytka showed him the process of how he directed the live-action/animation scenes. During filming in the summer of 1995, Jordan and visiting NBA players (such as Reggie Miller, Charles Barkley, and Patrick Ewing) regularly participated in pickup games with extras and college players. Extra Keith Gibbs noted that Jordan would trash-talk them during play, including taunting opponents after making contested shots.

Concept drawings and discussions between the animators and Pytka about how the animation would be incorporated into the live-action shots took place on set during shooting, and re-writes to the script would be done daily. As an experienced commercial and music video director working on a sports film, Pytka took on fast, unlimited camera movements and Dutch angles; this made integrating the characters into the shots challenging for the animators. To connect the real and animated worlds together, blue-screen shots of miniatures by Vision Crew Unlimited were used; these include a Christo-inspired interpretation of The Forum arena for exterior shots, city rooftops for a transition scene with a wide skyline view of Chicago serving as the chroma-keyed background, and space ship parts initially produced by Boss Film Studios for a Philip Morris advertisement.

=== Music ===
Carl Stalling's music compositions from the classic cartoons were used as temporary tracks, but were deemed "too outdated" and did not fit the film's contemporary visuals, with Reitman, Daniel Goldberg and Joe Medjuck feeling that it "lacked energy." James Newton Howard composed a score inspired by Stalling's that would work in a modern context, conducting a 99-musician orchestra to combine the traditional orchestral sound of Looney Tunes with contemporary elements.

The soundtrack sold enough albums to be certified as 6-times Platinum. The song "I Believe I Can Fly" by musical artist R. Kelly earned him three Grammy Awards. Other tracks included a cover of the Steve Miller Band's "Fly Like an Eagle" (by Seal), "Hit 'Em High (The Monstars' Anthem)" (by B-Real, Busta Rhymes, Coolio, LL Cool J, and Method Man), a cover of Cheech & Chong's "Basketball Jones" (by Barry White & Chris Rock), "I Turn to You" (by All-4-One), and "For You I Will" (by Monica). Jordan was asked to help approve the songs for the soundtrack. The film's title song was performed by the Quad City DJ's.

== Animation and design ==
=== Technology ===
Space Jam was one of the earliest animated productions to use digital technology. 2D animation and backgrounds were first done on paper with pencil at the Sherman Oaks studio before being scanned into Silicon Graphics Image files through Cambridge Animation Systems' software Animo and were then sent to Cinesite via a File Transfer Protocol, for its team to touch upon, digitally color, and composite into shots in Photoshop before being sent back to Sherman Oaks. Unlike previous projects that used the Cineon digital film system, Cinesite used the quicker Inferno and Flame systems for Space Jam. The film's Holly render farm consisted of 16 central processing units, four gigabytes of shared memory, and took up one million dollars of the film's budget, "on top of which the deskside boxes had 256 megabytes of RAM to splurge on whatever scene you needed to create and render," explained Privett.

Cinesite had begun developing proprietary software for motion tracking when working on Under Siege 2: Dark Territory (1995), which involved most of its shots incorporating a digital background; this made the company prepared for Space Jam, which consists of a bunch of moving camera shots with 3D backgrounds to be added. The CGI backgrounds moved around with the motion trackers via Cinesite's proprietary software Ball Buster, which identified the markers through algorithm. To avoid mistakes in the visuals as much as possible, Cinesite artists worked on the film by frame instead of viewing each shot as a whole; those, such as Jonathan Privett were dissatisfied with the method, primarily because it put them under much pressure: "We much preferred the good old fashioned run-at-24-fps, just-as-the-viewer-sees-it approach."

=== Backgrounds ===
The design of the stadium was heavily dictated by that of the film's many characters, and it was such a long process that it went through 94 revisions, explained Cinesite digital effects supervisor Carlos Arguello: "Tasmanian Devil was brown so we couldn't have a wooden brown upper level, and there were so many colorful characters, and Michael Jordan and everybody had to look good in all the scenes."

For scenes that take place in the stadium, shortcuts were made. For crane shots of the crowd of 15,000 people in the final basketball sequence, it was created with live-action extras, cloned animated crowd members, and a few computer-generated characters walking around the aisles in the stadium. When these shots involved camera movements, a few 2D extras were animated to reflect the angle of the camera, but much lighting was added to distract from the crowd, thus minimizing this work. The reflections of the floor on the gym were also "fake[d]" as raytracing would've meant rendering it for four days per a few frames.

The Gremlin from the cartoon Falling Hare was planned to appear in the crowd, but was cut because the filmmakers did not fully own the rights to him at the time.

=== Characters ===
Abbate suggested the hurried workflow of the animators bled into the character animation, resulting in a quick-witted style the Looney Tunes cartoons are most known for.

Although the animators had to work with almost 100 characters, they were the most focused on Bugs and Daffy not only because they were principal characters, but also because they were the most recognizable Warner Bros. characters to general audiences. Sculpting was incorporated the most on Bugs and Lola, including in "beauty shots" or sequences where they are together. Perkins conceived the idea of the villains being secondary colors, as the main Looney Tunes were either primary colors, black, or brown.

There was extensive experimentation with motion blur with the 2D characters, particularly Tweety; as Simon Eves explained, "The workflow was that an artist would track some specific points on the sequence of 2D character-on-black that came from the animation house, and I think it was able to take a basic roto shape as well, and then it would generate an interpolated motion vector field which could be applied as a variable directional blur. The field would deform based on the relative motion of the tracking points on the camera, to produce more accurate blur as the character deformed."

== Release ==
Warner Bros. released Space Jam through its Family Entertainment division in Canada and the United States on November 15, 1996. It premiered at Grauman's Chinese Theatre on November 10, 1996. During the premiere, the voice actors were not invited and moved into a small theater to watch the film. It was released in Europe in February–April 1997.

Space Jam made its premium television premiere on HBO on September 13, 1997, its cable television premiere on TNT on March 14, 1999, and its network television premiere on ABC's The Wonderful World of Disney on November 14, 1999.

Space Jam was re-released by Fathom Entertainment for a limited two-day run in honor of its 20th anniversary in November 2016. The film was re-released for one night only on May 20, 2026, exclusively in Dolby Cinema at AMC Theatres to coincide with the film's 30th anniversary.

=== Home media ===
Warner Home Video released Space Jam on VHS, DVD, and LaserDisc on March 11, 1997. The VHS edition was reprinted and re-released through Warner Home Video's catalog promotions—The Warner Bros. 75th Anniversary Celebration (1998), Century Collection (1999), Century 2000 (2000) and Warner Spotlight (2001). The film was re-released on DVD on July 25, 2000. On October 28, 2003, the film was once again re-released as a 2-disc special-edition DVD including newly made extras such as a commentary track, a featurette, production notes, and an hour of previously released Looney Tunes shorts and a television special.

On November 6, 2007, Space Jam was featured as one of four films in Warner Home Video's 4-Film Favorites: Family Comedies collection DVD (the other three being Looney Tunes: Back in Action (which was released seven years after Space Jam), Osmosis Jones, and Funky Monkey). On February 8, 2011, the first disc of the previous 2-disc edition was released by itself in a film-only edition DVD and on October 4, the film was released for the first time in widescreen HD on Blu-ray which, save for the Looney Tunes shorts, ported over all the extras from the 2003 2-disc edition DVD.

A double DVD release, paired with Looney Tunes: Back in Action, was released on June 7, 2016. On November 15, 2016, Warner Bros. released another Space Jam Blu-ray to commemorate the film's 20th anniversary.

On July 6, 2021, the film arrived on Ultra HD Blu-ray to celebrate the 25th anniversary and the release of Space Jam: A New Legacy.

=== Other media ===
Space Jam later expanded into a media franchise which includes comics, video games and merchandise. The Space Jam franchise is estimated to have generated $6 billion in total worldwide revenue. This includes a wide variety of merchandise, such as Air Jordans, Bugs Bunny shirts, Happy Meals, Mugsy Bogues jerseys, and Tweety gowns.

The film was adapted into a graphic novel published by DC Comics through their imprint "Warner Bros. Family Entertainment Reading" that published the Looney Tunes, Tiny Toon Adventures, Animaniacs, and Pinky and the Brain monthly comic books. The special issue was written by David Cody Weiss and drawn by Leonardo Batic.

A licensed pinball game by Sega, a video game for the PlayStation, Sega Saturn and MS-DOS by Acclaim, and a handheld LCD game by Tiger Electronics were released based on the film.

== Reception ==
=== Box office ===
Space Jam grossed over $27.5 million from 2,650 theaters on its opening weekend with an average of $10,388 per theater, topping the box office and beating out previous holdover Ransom and fellow new release The Mirror Has Two Faces ($12.2 million). The film later earned $16.2 million on its sophomore weekend and dropped to second place behind Star Trek: First Contact ($30.7 million). It later fell to third place with $13.5 million on its third weekend following the release of 101 Dalmatians. Space Jam closed on March 2, 1997 after grossing $90.4 million in North America. With an additional $140 million from the international market, the film grossed over $230.4 million worldwide, making it the tenth highest-grossing film of 1996. It also became the highest-grossing basketball film at the time, before it was overtaken by the anime film The First Slam Dunk in 2022.

In China, the film was released in 1997 and grossed CN¥24.1 million.

=== Critical response ===
On review aggregator Rotten Tomatoes, Space Jam holds an approval rating of 53% based on 158 reviews. The website's critics consensus reads, "While it's no slam dunk, Space Jam's silly, Looney Toons-laden slapstick and vivid animation will leave younger viewers satisfied – though accompanying adults may be more annoyed than entertained." Metacritic assigned the film a weighted average score of 57 out of 100 based on 32 critics, indicating "mixed or average reviews." Audiences polled by CinemaScore gave the film an average grade of "A−" on an A+ to F scale.

Roger Ebert and Gene Siskel of the Chicago Sun-Times and Chicago Tribune both gave the film a thumbs up, although Siskel's praise was more reserved. In his review, Ebert gave the film 3½ stars and noted, "Space Jam is a happy marriage of good ideas—three films for the price of one, giving us a comic treatment of the career adventures of Michael Jordan, crossed with a Looney Tunes cartoon and some showbiz warfare. ... the result is delightful, a family movie in the best sense (which means the adults will enjoy it, too)." Siskel focused much of his praise on Jordan's performance, saying, "He wisely accepted as a first movie a script that builds nicely on his genial personality in an assortment of TV ads. The sound bites are just a little longer." Leonard Maltin also gave the film a positive review (three stars), stating that "Jordan is very engaging, the vintage characters perform admirably ... and the computer-generated special effects are a collective knockout." Todd McCarthy of Variety praised the film for its humor as well as the Looney Tunes' antics and Jordan's acting.

Although Janet Maslin of The New York Times criticized the film's animation, she later went on to say that the film is a "fond tribute to [the Looney Tunes characters'] past." Michael Wilmington of the Chicago Tribune complained about some aspects of the movie, stating "...we don't get the co-stars' best stuff. Michael doesn't soar enough. The Looney Tunes don't pulverize us the way they did when Chuck Jones, Friz Freleng or Bob Clampett were in charge." Yet overall, he also liked the film, giving it 3 stars and saying: "Is it cute? Yes. Is it a crowd-pleaser? Yup. Is it classic? Nope. (Though it could have been.)" TV Guide gave the film only two stars, calling it a "cynical attempt to cash in on the popularity of Warner Bros. cartoon characters and basketball player Michael Jordan, inspired by a Nike commercial." Margaret A. McGurk of The Cincinnati Enquirer gave the film 2½ stars out of 4 writing, "Technical spectacle amounts to nothing without a good story." Lawrence Toppman of The Spokesman-Review described the film as "average," saying, "It's broadly funny in spots but without any edge. It'll make kids giggle, but it makes a minuscule effort to appeal to adults."

According to author Kevin Sandler, critics disliked how the Looney Tunes characters were portrayed in the film. Sandler wrote, "Space Jam appear[s] to have replaced identity and irreverence with milquetoast and merchandising. This decontextualization has turned each character into a soulless, calculated, and crass commercial entity, a set of mannerisms and catchphrases without point or purpose. The comedy no longer springs from a conflict between opposing personalities; they are now all friends living in someplace called 'Looney Tune Land.' Instead, the comedy comes from the characters going out of character or reprising old scenes out of context." C.W. Nevius of SFGate stated that audience members reacted in shock to a scene where Tweety is smacked into a wall by the Monstar Bang.

Veteran Looney Tunes director Chuck Jones had expressed hope that the film would "treat the characters carefully," but was later critical of the film and its premise, opining that Bugs Bunny would not have enlisted help from others in resolving a conflict, and that Porky Pig would never say, "I wet myself." During a dinner celebration with the animation staff of Space Jam and executives, Jones was asked to deliver a congratulatory speech to the animators' work, but upon instead sharing his opinions on the film, was forcefully escorted off the lot by security.

Looney Tunes: Back in Action director Joe Dante disliked the film's representation of the Looney Tunes brand and the characters' personalities, and later developed Back in Action to more faithfully portray them. Larry Doyle, who wrote Back in Action, described Space Jam as "awful." Animation historian Charles Gardner stated, "...the efforts to idolize Michael [Jordan] simply predominate the first part of the picture, making it obvious where the producers' priorities lie, rendering Bugs [Bunny] and the Looney Tunes gang more or less nothing more than window dressing to a vanity project for the star." He also described the film as "a slog to get through."

=== Accolades ===
- 1997 ASCAP Film and Television Music Awards
  - Won: Most Performed Songs from Motion Pictures (Diane Warren for the song "For You I Will")
  - Won: Top Box Office Films (James Newton Howard)
- 1997 Annie Awards
  - Won: Best Individual Achievement: Technical Achievement
  - Nomination: Best Animated Feature
  - Nomination: Best Individual Achievement: Directing in a Feature Production (Bruce W. Smith and Tony Cervone)
  - Nomination: Best Individual Achievement: Producing in a Feature Production (Ron Tippe)
- 1997 Grammy Awards
  - Won: Best Song Written Specifically for Motion Picture or for Television (R. Kelly for the song "I Believe I Can Fly")
- 1997 MTV Movie Awards
  - Nomination: Best Movie Song (R. Kelly for the song "I Believe I Can Fly")
- 1997 Satellite Awards
  - Nomination: Best Motion Picture- Animated or Mixed Media (Daniel Goldberg, Joe Medjuck, Ivan Reitman)
- 1997 World Animation Celebration
  - Won: Best Use of Animation in a Motion Picture Trailer
- 1997 Young Artist Awards
  - Nomination: Best Family Feature- Animation or Special Effects

== Legacy ==
=== Cultural influence ===
Jordan, who was a spokesman for MCI Communications before the film was made, would appear with the Looney Tunes characters (as his "Space Jam buddies") in several MCI commercials for several years after the film was released before MCI merged with WorldCom and subsequently Verizon Communications. Bugs had previously appeared with Jordan as "Hare Jordan" in Nike ads for the Air Jordan VII and Air Jordan VIII. In the next theatrical Looney Tunes film, Back in Action, Jordan appears in archive footage from this film as one of the disguises of Mr. Chairman (Steve Martin). In 2013, Yahoo! Screen released a parody of ESPN's 30 for 30 about the game shown in the film. The short dates the game as taking place on November 17, 1995, although Jordan's real-life return to basketball when it occurred on March 18. In April 2019, the website SBNation ran a mockumentary April Fools Day episode of its popular Rewinder series on Jordan's climactic shot. A television film crossover with Teen Titans Go!—Teen Titans Go! See Space Jam—aired on Cartoon Network in June 2021. The film features the Teen Titans meeting the Nerdlucks and providing humorous commentary over the original film. The film's length is slightly abridged, omitting the opening credits and several scenes that do not feature the Looney Tunes, and the soundtrack is replaced by an original score.

The film's official website, spacejam.com, was created in 1996 alongside promotion of the film, and remained unchanged but active for 25 years prior to the release of the film's sequel, an unusual aspect to film promotion websites. The site was one of the earliest film promotion websites, and included a number of unrefined web design facets, such as heavy use of animated GIFs. While the site's content had been moved under Warner Bros.'s site around 2003, the site's design gained a resurgence of interest around 2010 as a historical artifact of the early days of the web, and the studio returned the site to the spacejam.com address in response. Following the release of Space Jam: A New Legacy's first trailer in April 2021, the website was updated for promotion of the new film, though the 1996 content remained available as a separate landing page.

Beginning November 15, 2026, Jordan's YouTube channel began releasing a six-part weekly released documentary celebrating the 30th anniversary of the film entitled Space Jam: Beyond the Jam, featuring interviews with people involved in the film including Jordan and Pytka, celebrity fans, as well as Bugs (voiced posthumously by Eric Bauza) and Lola (voiced by her current voice actor Chandni Parekh).

== Sequel ==
A sequel to Space Jam was planned as early as 1996. As development began, Space Jam 2 was going to involve a new basketball competition with Michael Jordan and the Looney Tunes against a new alien villain named Berserk-O!. Artist Bob Camp was tasked with designing Berserk-O! and his two henchmen. Joe Pytka would have returned to direct while Cervone and his creative partner Spike Brandt signed on to direct the animation sequences. However, Jordan did not agree to star in a sequel, and Warner Bros. eventually canceled plans for Space Jam 2.

Several potential sequels, including Spy Jam with Jackie Chan—that would end up becoming the basis for Looney Tunes: Back in Action, Race Jam with Jeff Gordon, Golf Jam with Tiger Woods, and Skate Jam with Tony Hawk were all discussed, but never came to be.

In February 2014, Warner Bros. officially announced development of a sequel that would star LeBron James. In July 2015, James and his film studio, SpringHill Entertainment, signed a deal with Warner Bros. for television, film and digital content after receiving positive reviews for his role in Trainwreck. By 2016, Justin Lin signed onto the project as director, and co-screenwriter with Andrew Dodge and Alfredo Botello. By August 2018, Lin left the project, and Terence Nance was hired to direct the film. In September 2018, Ryan Coogler was announced as a producer for the film. Filming would take place in California and within a 30-mile radius of Los Angeles. Prior to production, the film received $21.8 million in tax credits as a result of a new tax incentive program from the state.

In February 2019, after releasing the official logo with a promotional poster, Space Jam 2 was announced to be scheduled for release on July 16, 2021. Principal photography began on June 25, 2019. On July 16, 2019, it was announced Nance was leaving the project because he and "the studio/producers had different takes on the creative vision for Space Jam 2", and that Malcolm D. Lee would serve as his replacement. In May 2020, James officially revealed the title and logo of the film as Space Jam: A New Legacy. On March 4, 2021, it was confirmed that the sequel would also feature various characters in the Warner Bros. film and television archive.

Jordan was reportedly set to make a cameo in A New Legacy, as the makers teased the fans in June 2021 that "Jordan will appear in the film, but not in the way you would expect it." In fact, as shown in the film, he appeared in various pictures from his career and the Space Jam film. In a scene, Sylvester claimed to have found Jordan, but he actually found actor Michael B. Jordan, who thus made the cameo expected to be made by the former Bulls star.

After the release of A New Legacy, a third film was in talks by Lee with Dwayne Johnson involved as the lead, transitioning on the sports genre from basketball to professional wrestling.

== See also ==
- List of basketball films

== Bibliography ==
- Bittner, Drew (December 1996). "Space Jam". Starlog. No. 233. pp. 52–57.
- Lyons, Mike (November 1996a). "Space Jam". Cinefantastique. Vol. 28, no. 4/5. pp. 7–9.
- Lyons, Mike (December 1996b). "Space Jam". Cinefantastique. Vol. 28, no. 6. pp. 10–11, 13.
