= C'mon N' Ride It (The Train) =

1996 single by Quad City DJ's

Single by Quad City DJ's

from the album Get On Up and Dance
- Released: February 27, 1996
- Genre: Hip hop; Miami bass
- Length: 7:31 (album version); 4:09 (radio edit)
- Label: Big Beat; Atlantic; QuadraSound
- Songwriters: Barry White; C.C. Lemonhead; Jay Ski; Michael Phillips
- Producers: C.C. Lemonhead; Jay Ski

Quad City DJ's singles chronology
"C'mon N' Ride It (The Train)" (1996)	"Hoop N Yo Face" (1996)

"C'mon N' Ride It (The Train)" is a song by American Florida-based musical group Quad City DJ's, released in February 1996 as the lead single from their debut album, Get On Up and Dance (1996). It is based on a sample of Barry White's 1974 "Theme from Together Brothers" from the soundtrack to the film Together Brothers. The song peaked at number three on the US Billboard Hot 100 and reached the top 40 in Australia and New Zealand.

"C'mon N' Ride It" was ranked the number-one song of 1996 by Village Voice magazine, and in 2010, Pitchfork Media included the song as one of their "Ten Actually Good 90s Jock Jams". In 2022, Rolling Stone ranked it number 86 in their list of "200 Greatest Dance Songs of All Time". The song is also used in a wide variety of sports events, including by the National Football League for its 2025 kickoff promotion.

== Critical reception ==
Larry Flick from Billboard magazine commented, "Don'tcha want another booty jam? Sure, ya do—especially if it jiggles with the kind of infectious chorus that this ditty has. This is one of those records that requires the mind to be turned off. The second you start to take all the double-entendre train/ride references too seriously, you are likely to get agitated. Take this for what it is: a cute moment that is good for a quiet chuckle and a wiggle." Peter Miro from Cash Box wrote in his review of the Get On Up and Dance album, that singles like "C'mon N' Ride It (The Train)" "are Quad City principals C.C. and Jay-Ski's infectious contribution to a can't-keep-still mandate." James Hamilton from Music Week's RM Dance Update described the song as a "Tag Team 'Whoomp!'-type raggeoly rapped and chanted frenetic corny 0–135.8bpm jump around."

== Track listings ==
- US maxi-CD, 12-inch, and maxi-cassette single
1. "C'mon N' Ride It (The Train)" (club mix) – 7:31
2. "C'mon N' Ride It (The Train)" (original mix) – 4:06
3. "C'mon N' Ride It (The Train)" (Railroad mix) – 6:05
4. "C'mon N' Ride It (The Train)" (instrumental) – 6:07
5. "C'mon N' Ride It (The Train)" (a cappella) – 6:15

Note: The European and Australian maxi-CD single switches tracks one and two.

- US 12-inch remix single

A1. "C'mon N' Ride It (The Train)" (remix) – 6:09
A2. "C'mon N' Ride It (The Train)" (remix instrumental) – 4:00
A3. "C'mon N' Ride It (The Train)" (remix bonus beats) – 3:34
B1. "C'mon N' Ride It (The Train)" (Bass mix) – 4:09
B2. "C'mon N' Ride It (The Train)" (Bass mix instrumental) – 4:09
B3. "C'mon N' Ride It (The Train)" (Bass mix a cappella) – 4:07

- US cassette single
1. "C'mon N' Ride It (The Train)" (original mix) – 4:06
2. "C'mon N' Ride It (The Train)" (instrumental) – 6:07
- UK CD single
1. "C'mon N' Ride It (The Train)" (D.P. radio edit) – 3:48
2. "C'mon N' Ride It (The Train)" (D.P. club mix) – 6:21
3. "C'mon N' Ride It (The Train)" (D.P. dub) – 6:50
4. "C'mon N' Ride It (The Train)" (Erick 'More' Beats) – 3:20
5. "C'mon N' Ride It (The Train)" (Erick 'More' dub) – 6:57
6. "C'mon N' Ride It (The Train)" (album version) – 7:29
- UK 12-inch single
1. "C'mon N' Ride It (The Train)" (album version) – 7:29
2. "C'mon N' Ride It (The Train)" (D.P. club mix) – 6:21
3. "C'mon N' Ride It (The Train)" (Erick 'More' dub) – 6:57
4. "C'mon N' Ride It (The Train)" (Erick 'More' Beats) – 3:20

== Charts ==
=== Weekly charts ===
Chart (1996–1997)	Peak position
Australia (ARIA)	13
Canada Top Singles (RPM)	76
Canada Dance/Urban (RPM)	14
New Zealand (Recorded Music NZ)	30
UK Singles (Official Charts)	95
US Billboard Hot 100	3
US Hot R&B Singles (Billboard)	15
US Hot Rap Singles (Billboard)	4
US Maxi-Singles Sales (Billboard)	2
US Top 40/Mainstream (Billboard)	4
US Top 40/Rhythm-Crossover (Billboard)	5
US Cash Box Top 100	3

=== Year-end charts ===
Chart (1996)	Position
US Billboard Hot 100	11
US Hot R&B Singles (Billboard)	41
US Hot Rap Singles (Billboard)	7
US Maxi-Singles Sales (Billboard)	8
US Top 40/Mainstream (Billboard)	28
US Top 40/Rhythm-Crossover (Billboard)	9

Chart (1997)	Position
Australia (ARIA)	100

== Certifications ==
Region	Certification	Certified units/sales
Australia (ARIA)	Gold	35,000^{^}
United States (RIAA)	Platinum	1,400,000
^{^} Shipments figures based on certification alone.

== Release history ==
Region	Date	Format(s)	Label(s)	Ref.
United States	February 27, 1996	CD	Atlantic; Big Beat; QuadraSound	
United States	March 19, 1996	Contemporary hit radio	Atlantic; Big Beat; QuadraSound	
United Kingdom	December 30, 1996	12-inch vinyl; CD; cassette	Atlantic; Big Beat	
