= Tootsee Roll =

Single by 69 Boyz

from the album 199Quad
- Released: 1994
- Recorded: 1993
- Genre: Hip hop; Miami bass
- Length: 4:18
- Label: Rip-It
- Songwriters: Albert V Bryant; Pat Hicks
- Producer: Quad City DJ's

69 Boyz singles chronology
"Tootsee Roll" (1994)	"Kitty Kitty" (1994)

Music video
- "Tootsee Roll" on YouTube

"Tootsee Roll" is a song by American rap group 69 Boyz released as the first single from their debut album, 199Quad (1994). In the United States, the song sold one million copies and earned a platinum certification from the Recording Industry Association of America. It reached number eight on the US Billboard Hot 100 in early January 1995, number nine on Hot R&B Singles chart and number one on Hot Rap Singles chart. "Tootsee Roll" took 27 weeks to hit its Hot 100 peak of number eight, spending the previous four months in the top 20 before finally reaching its peak.

== Charts ==
=== Weekly charts ===
Chart (1994–1995)	Peak position
US Billboard Hot 100	8
US Hot R&B/Hip-Hop Songs (Billboard)	9
US Hot Rap Songs (Billboard)	1
US Rhythmic Airplay (Billboard)	16

=== Year-end charts ===
Chart (1994)	Position
US Billboard Hot 100	65
US Hot R&B/Hip-Hop Songs (Billboard)	38
US Maxi-Singles Sales (Billboard)	26

Chart (1995)	Position
US Billboard Hot 100	63
