= Roget Romain =

Roget M. Romain (born September 7, 1966) is an American executive, producer, entertainment manager and entrepreneur. As a record executive for over 15 years, Romain worked with some of music's top artists and has 8 RIAA certified gold and platinum plaques to his credit. In recent years, Romain has formed and developed several web-based corporations that specialize in media optimization, branding, online marketing, music and entertainment. He is best known for introducing Adina Howard to the music scene and served as an executive producer on the film "Life After Death" The Notorious B.I.G Ten Years Later.

== Early years ==
Roget Romain was born in Brooklyn, New York, to Marie Beaulieu Romain and Roger Romain. His mother was a nurse who raised him and his sister. He got his start in the entertainment business when he was befriended by Doug E. Fresh. Romain attended the Center for Media Arts in New York with fellow alumni Al B. Sure! and Hurby Azor of Salt-n-Pepa fame. He temped at ASCAP in membership and later moved to Florida to work at The Box in the early 1990s.

== Music industry ==
Romain has produced and worked with many top artists including Notorious B.I.G., 50 Cent, Mariah Carey, Tupac Shakur, Usher, Naughty by Nature, Pink, Mos Def, Robin S., Adina Howard, Keith Sweat, and many more. He earned his first platinum plaque with Adina Howard while working for Sylvia Rhone at East West Records. He later received a multi-platinum plaque for working on Pink's debut album Can't Take Me Home. While residing in Los Angeles, he worked with Keith Andes and After 7, a Platinum R&B group composed of Melvin Edmonds, Kevon Edmonds and Keith Mitchell. The Edmonds brothers are siblings of singer-songwriter-producer Kenneth "Babyface" Edmonds. He returned to New York City to close a production and publishing deal with Universal Records/Def Jam Recordings and Lyor Cohen called Romain Recordings Inc. He lectures occasionally at Pace University and represents Rahzel American beatboxer and rapper former member of The Roots.Lastly, Romain works with international actor Chad L. Coleman as his business manager.

== Entrepreneur ==
In June 2009, Romain partnered with internet-technology expert Kurt Stevenson to form Web Asset Partners Inc., a full-service brand development and corporate identity consulting firm. The firm has created brands for Fortune 500 companies, as well as independent and major music labels. Clients include Tommy Boy Records and JYP Entertainment as well as singer Blake Lewis of American Idol fame, number one Korean pop group Wonder Girls and New Music Seminar Inc. Romain also has ownership in several other web-based media companies, including Sample My Melodyz Inc., Artist Rep Direct Inc. and Hiphopbible.net.

== Personal life ==
Romain currently works with philanthropist, venture capitalist and real estate developer Henry Hewes. He considers Hewes to be his mentor and close friend. Romain remains very close to his roots and still resides in Brooklyn. He has four children, sons Roget Jordan Romain (born 1993) and Niko Marc Romain (2005), and daughters Yasmeen Romain (1997) and Lana Romain (2001). He recently married Balkis Romain (2010).
