= Warner Sunset Records =

Warner Sunset Records was an American record label established in 1996 by Warner Music Group to release soundtrack albums of Warner Bros. films. The label closed in 2010 after 14 years and was replaced by WaterTower Music that year. Warner Bros. Records had also changed its name to Warner Records, and unveiled a new logo—replacing the Warner Bros. shield with a wordmark and black circle (both partially cut off at the bottom) in 2019.

== Discography ==
Artist	Album	Details
Various	Space Jam: Music from and Inspired by the Motion Picture	Released: November 12, 1996; Chart position: US #69
Various	Quest for Camelot: Music from the Motion Picture	Released: May 5, 1998; Chart position: US #117
Various	Next Friday	Released: December 7, 1999; Chart position: US #19
John Williams	A.I. Artificial Intelligence	Released: July 3, 2001
