= 69 Boyz =

American hip hop group

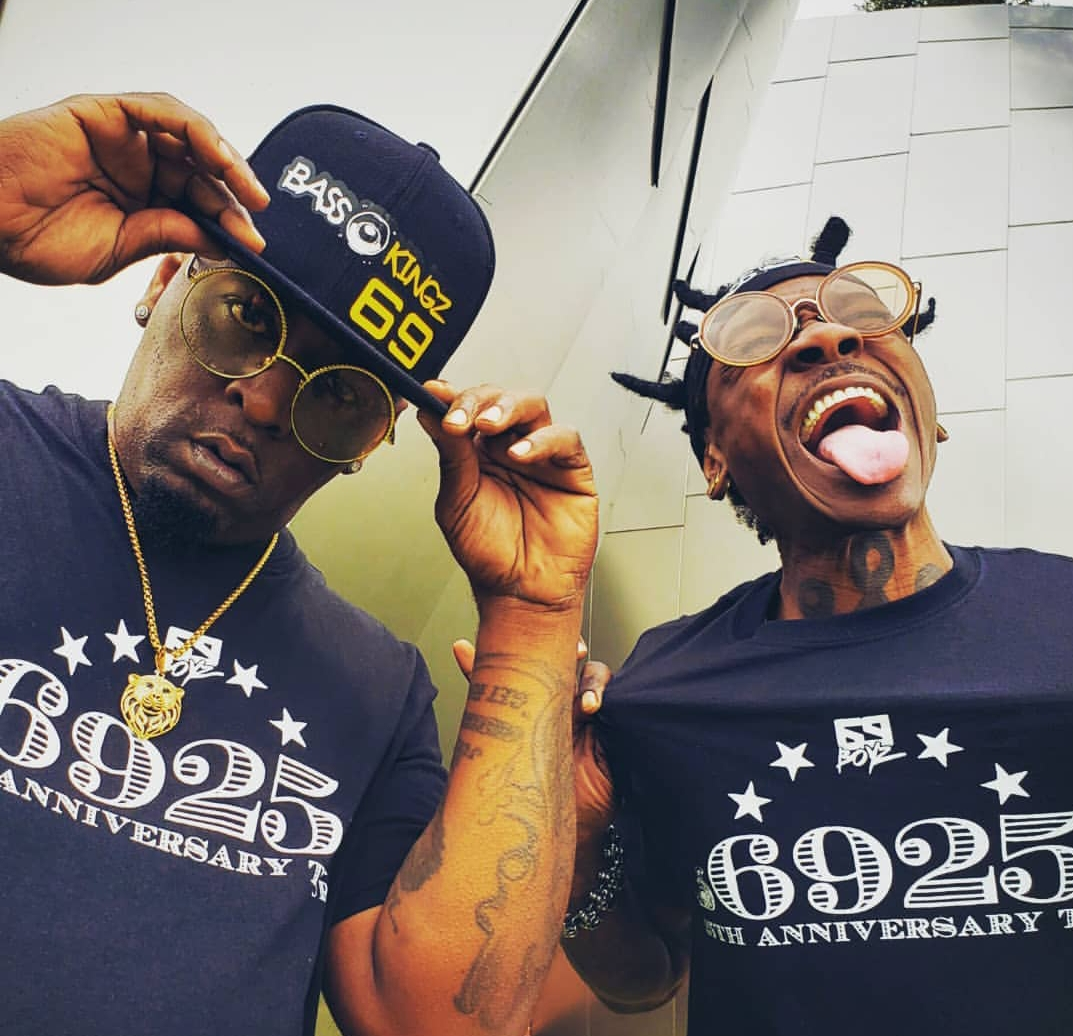
- 69 Boyz in 2019

Background information
- Origin: Jacksonville, Florida, U.S.
- Genres: Hip hop, Miami bass, Southern hip hop
- Years active: 1992–present
- Label: Responsible Recordings
- Members: Thrill da Playa; Fast Cash

69 Boyz is an American Miami bass and hip hop duo from Jacksonville, Florida, consisting of Thrill Da Playa (Van Bryant) and Fast Cash (Barry Wright), and are best known for their 1994 hit record "Tootsee Roll". The group was created by Bryant with the assistance of producers Nathaniel "C.C. Lemonhead" Orange and "Jay Ski" McGowan (of Quad City DJs and 95 South), and were produced by Bass Mechanics.

== Career ==
In 1992, Thrill da Playa and Fast Cash teamed up to form 69 Boyz, which the group claimed was inspired by both members' birth year of 1969 and the sexual act of the same name.

69 Boyz achieved its first and only major success in the summer of 1994 with the single "Tootsee Roll", off their first album 199Quad. The track topped the Billboard Hot Rap Singles chart, peaked at #8 on the Hot 100, and #9 on the Hot R&B/Hip-Hop Songs chart, and was certified platinum. The followup single, "Kitty Kitty", did not fare as well, reaching #51 on the Hot 100, #36 on Hot R&B/Hip-Hop Singles, and #6 on Hot Rap Singles. 69 Boyz were nominated for three 1995 Soul Train Music Awards.

The 1995 single "Five O, Five O (Here They Come)" was recorded for the Bad Boys soundtrack. The following year, the track "Hoop N Yo Face" was featured on the Sunset Park soundtrack and peaked at #95 on the Billboard Hot 100.

69 Boyz' second album, The Wait Is Over, was released in July 1998 and featured the single "Woof Woof" for the 1998 film Dr. Dolittle. The song reached number 31 on the Billboard Hot 100.

The group's third album, 2069, was released in April 2000 and featured one single, "How We Roll", which reached #5 on the Billboard Hot Rap Singles chart. Trunk Funk 101 (2001) was their fourth and final album and also featured only one single, the non-charting "She's Skurred".

== Discography ==
=== Studio albums ===
Title	Details	Peak chart positions		Certifications
Title	Details	U.S.	U.S. R&B	Certifications
199Quad	Release date: May 31, 1994; Label: Rip-It; Formats: CD	59	13	RIAA: Platinum
The Wait is Over	Release date: July 14, 1998; Label: Big Beat; Formats: CD	114	39	
2069	Release date: April 18, 2000; Label: Home Bass; Formats: CD	—	55	
Trunk Funk 101	Release date: September 25, 2001; Label: Thundershot; Formats: CD	—	—	
"—" denotes releases that did not chart

=== Singles ===
Year	Single	Peak chart positions			Album
Year	Single	U.S.	U.S. R&B	U.S. Rap	Album
1994	"Tootsee Roll"	8	9	1	199Quad
1994	"Kitty Kitty"	51	36	6	199Quad
1996	"Hoop N Yo Face"	95	62	19	Sunset Park (soundtrack)
1998	"Woof Woof"	31	24	2	The Wait is Over
1998	"Get on Your Feet"	—	—	—	The Wait is Over
2000	"How We Roll"	—	74	5	2069
2001	"She's Skurred"	—	—	—	Trunk Funk 101
"—" denotes releases that did not chart
