= Quad City DJ's =

American hip hop group

- Members of the Quad City DJ's. Left to right, Jay Ski, JeLanna LaFleur, and C.C. Lemonhead

Background information
- Origin: Jacksonville, Florida, U.S.
- Genres: Freestyle; Miami bass
- Years active: 1988–1997; 2015–present
- Labels: Quadrasound, Big Beat
- Members: Tamara Wallace; C.C. Lemonhead; Tony WHOA!
- Past members: Jay Ski; JeLana LaFleur

Quad City DJ's is an American hip hop group originally consisting of Jay Ski (Johnny McGowan), C.C. Lemonhead (Nathaniel Orange), and JeLanna LaFleur who recorded the 1996 hit "C'mon N' Ride It (The Train)", a rap-remix of Barry White's 1974 "Theme from Together Brothers". They are also known for writing and performing the theme song to the 1996 live-action/animated basketball film Space Jam.

== Background ==
=== 1988–1995: Early years ===
Ski and Lemonhead first partnered in 1988 in Jacksonville, Florida. They first were in a group known as Chill Deal. During this time they produced fellow acts Three Grand and Icey J, the latter being famous for the female answer rap to Rob Base's "It Takes Two" entitled "It Takes a Real Man". After Chill Deal dissolved, they reformed as 95 South to create the triple platinum hit "Whoot, There It Is". Their success led to work with Dis-n-Dat producing "Freak Me Baby" and 69 Boyz producing the double platinum single "Tootsee Roll".

=== 1996–1997: Formation and Get On Up and Dance ===
In 1996, Ski and Lemonhead enlisted singer JeLanna “Lana” LaFleur and formed Quad City DJ's; the term "Quad" in the group's name is a local reference to bass. In February 1996, they released the single "C'mon N' Ride It (The Train)". The song was a success, peaking at number three on the Billboard Hot 100 and was certified platinum. Following its release, Lemonhead opted to take a step back from the limelight and instead the group was marketed as a duo.

As a duo, Quad City DJ's released their debut album Get On Up and Dance in June 1996. It peaked at number 31 on the Billboard Hot 200 and was certified platinum. Along with "C'mon N' Ride It (The Train)", the album also included the minor hit "Summer Jam" which was released as a single the following year and peaked at #27 on the Billboard Hot Rap Singles chart.

Later in 1996, the duo contributed to the Space Jam soundtrack, performing its titular theme song. The song peaked at number 37 on the Billboard Hot 100.

In the summer of 1997, the duo co-headlined the Dance Across America tour with La Bouche.

=== 2015–present: Later releases and new members ===
In 2015, Quad City DJ's released the single "4 Minute TwerkOut"; the release was credited to Jay Ski and the Quad City DJ's. Another single, "What Happens Here Stays Here", was released in 2017.

In 2021, the group began touring occasionally across the United States with a new line-up featuring original member C.C. Lemonhead alongside new members Tony WHOA! (Anthony Wallace II) and Tamara Wallace (formerly of the Funky Green Dogs). A year prior, this line-up recorded "Brand New Jam" for the soundtrack to Space Jam: A New Legacy, but it ended up not being included on the soundtrack.

== Discography ==
=== Studio albums ===
Title	Details	Peak chart positions		Certifications
Title	Details	US	US R&B	Certifications
Get On Up and Dance	Released: June 25, 1996; Label: Quadrasound, Big Beat; Formats: CD, cassette, 2×LP	31	23	RIAA: Platinum

=== Singles ===
Year	Single	Chart positions										Certifications	Album
Year	Single	US	US R&B	US Rap	AUS	CAN	CAN Dan.	GER	NLD	NZ	UK	Certifications	Album
1996	"C'mon N' Ride It (The Train)"	3	15	4	13	76	14	—	—	30	95	RIAA: Platinum; ARIA: Gold	Get On Up and Dance
1996	"Space Jam"	37	49	11	97	—	—	71	67	24	57		Space Jam: Music from and Inspired by the Motion Picture
1997	"Summer Jam"	105	95	27	—	—	—	—	—	—	—		Get On Up and Dance
1997	"Let's Do It"	—	—	—	—	—	—	—	—	—	—		Get On Up and Dance

== See also ==
- Southern rap
- Miami bass
