= 95 South =

American hip hop group

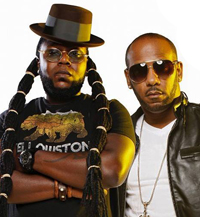

Background information
- Origin: Jacksonville, Florida, U.S.
- Genres: Hip hop, Miami bass, Southern hip hop
- Years active: 1993–present
- Labels: Wrap Records, RCA
- Members: Carlos "Daddy Black" Spencer; Mike "Mike Mike" Phillips

95 South are an American hip hop group from Jacksonville, Florida. They started as a Miami bass group of Artice "AB" Bartley, Carlos "Daddy Black" Spencer and Jay "Ski" McGowan. The group's name is a reference to Interstate 95, which passes through the city. Today, 95 South is a duo composed of Mike Mike (Michael Phillips) and Daddy Black (Carlos Spencer).

Their biggest success was the 1993 hit "Whoot, There It Is", from their debut album Quad City Knock, which reached No. 11 on the Billboard Hot 100. The song was produced by C.C. Lemonhead and Jay "Ski" McGowan, then known as The Bass Mechanics. The album reached at No. 71 on the Billboard 200.

Daddy Black claims their song, "Woot There It Is" was stolen by Tag Team, who named their song, "Whomp There It Is".

There was a female member, named K-Nock, featured on Quad City Knock. Her vocals can be heard on the songs "K-Knock in da House/We Got da Bass" and "Da Kinda Bass".

In 1995, they released their second album, One Mo' 'Gen. It contained the song "Rodeo" which reached No. 77 on the Billboard Hot 100. The album itself peaked at No. 158 on the Billboard 200. In 1997, 95 South made a guest appearance on Aaron Carter's eponymous debut album for the song "Shake It". In 2000, the group contributed to the soundtrack for the film Bring It On, with the song "Cheer for Me". Their third album, Tightwork 3000, followed in 2000. The duo also remixed songs for artists including Jordan Knight, Dru Hill and LFO.

Since 2000, the group has continued to tour the United States at major festivals including Grad Bash, Funk Fest tours, at colleges and in private functions. In 2014, they started touring with a live band in addition to a DJ. The single "Ridin in My Chevy" was released in April 2016. 95 South released another single, "After Party" on December 16, 2016. In 2016, the group announced they added a four-piece band to the group.

== Discography ==
Album information
Quad City Knock
- Released: 1993
- Billboard 200 chart position: No. 71
- R&B/Hip-Hop chart position: No. 20
- Singles: "Whoot, There It Is", "Hump wit It", "Do the Booty Hop"
One Mo' 'Gen
- Released: 1995
- Billboard 200 chart position: No. 158
- R&B/Hip-Hop chart position: No. 29
- Singles: "Rodeo", "Heiny Heiny"
Tightwork 3000
- Released: 2000
- Billboard 200 chart position:
- R&B/Hip-Hop chart position:
- Singles: "Tightwork", "Wet-n-Wild"
Ridin in My Chevy
- Released: 2016
- Art of the Mix Hip-Hop chart position: 12
- Singles: "Ridin in My Chevy"
After Party
- Release Date: December 16, 2016
- Singles: "After Party"
