= 1993 in hip-hop =

This article summarizes the events, album releases, and album release dates in hip-hop for the year 1993.

== Released albums ==
Release Date	Artist	Album
January 1	End Time Warriors	Let's Stay Together
January 1	Professor X the Overseer	Puss 'N Boots (The Struggle Continues...)
January 12	Raw Breed	Lune Tunz
January 12	Madstyle	Bloodrush
January 19	Snow	12 Inches of Snow
January 26	King T	Tha Triflin' Album
January 26	Paperboy	The Nine Yards
February 2	Brand Nubian	In God We Trust
February 2	Strickly Roots	Strickly Friends (Begs No Friends)
February 2	Above the Law	Black Mafia Life
February 2	Young Black Teenagers	Dead Enz Kidz Doin' Lifetime Bidz
February 9	Digable Planets	Reachin' (A New Refutation of Time and Space)
February 9	Apache	Apache Ain't Shit
February 16	Chief Groovy Loo And The Chosen Tribe	Got 'Em Running Scared
February 16	Kilo	Bluntly Speaking
February 16	Success-n-Effect	Drive-by of Uh Revolutionist
February 16	2Pac	Strictly 4 My N.I.G.G.A.Z...
February 16	Kam	Neva Again
February 16	Flavor Unit	Roll Wit' Tha Flava
February 23	Naughty by Nature	19 Naughty III
March 2	Various Artists	CB4 (soundtrack)
March 2	B-Legit	Tryin' to Get a Buck
March 9	Ant Banks	Sittin' on Somethin' Phat
March 9	Bloods & Crips	Bangin' on Wax
March 9	Geto Boys	Till Death Do Us Part
March 9	Mad Kap	Look Ma Duke, No Hands
March 9	I.M.P	Back in the Days
March 9	Various Artists	Teenage Mutant Ninja Turtles III: Original Motion Picture Soundtrack
March 16	Kid Rock	The Polyfuze Method
March 23	Ice-T	Home Invasion
March 23	Just-Ice	Gun Talk
March 23	Monie Love	In a Word or 2
March 23	P.M. Dawn	The Bliss Album...?
March 30	LL Cool J	14 Shots to the Dome
March 30	Onyx	Bacdafucup
April 1	Marxman	33 Revolutions per Minute
April 13	Mobb Deep	Juvenile Hell
April 13	The Beatnuts	Intoxicated Demons
April 13	K-Rino	Stories from the Black Book
April 13	Capital Tax	The Swoll Package
April 15	95 South	Quad City Knock
April 16	Suga-T	It's All Good
April 20	C-Bo	Gas Chamber
April 20	Tim Dog	Do or Die
April 20	Da Youngsta's	The Aftermath
April 20	Various Artists	Who's the Man? (soundtrack)
April 20	Brokin English Kilk	Brokin English Kilk
April 20	Trends of Culture	Trendz
April 27	Freestyle Fellowship	Innercity Griots
April 27	MC Breed	The New Breed
April 27	Prime Minister Pete Nice and Daddy Rich	Dust to Dust
May 4	Run-D.M.C.	Down with the King
May 4	Masta Ace Incorporated	SlaughtaHouse
May 4	Funkdoobiest	Which Doobie U B?
May 4	The Coup	Kill My Landlord
May 4	Various Artists	Posse (soundtrack)
May 18	5th Ward Boyz	Ghetto Dope
May 18	Guru	Guru's Jazzmatazz, Vol. 1
May 18	Total Devastation	Total Devastation
May 19	The Roots	Organix
May 26	Big Daddy Kane	Looks Like a Job For...
May 26	Boss	Born Gangstaz
May 26	Havoc & Prodeje	Livin' in a Crime Wave
May 26	Y'all So Stupid	Van Full of Pakistans
May 26	Various Artists	Menace II Society (soundtrack)
May 26	Knucklehedz	Stricktly Savage
May 28	B.O.N.E. Enterpri$e	Faces of Death
June	Ed O.G. and Da Bulldogs	Roxbury 02119
June 1	Smokin' Suckaz wit Logic	Playin' Foolz
June 2	DMG	Rigormortiz
June 2	Top Authority	Somethin' to Blaze To
June 7	D-Shot	The Shot Calla
June 13	I.M.P.	Back in the Days
June 16	Esham	KKKill the Fetus
June 16	Father MC	Sex Is Law
June 17	Dre Dog	The New Jim Jones
June 22	Biz Markie	All Samples Cleared!
June 22	Jungle Brothers	J Beez wit the Remedy
June 22	MC Lyte	Ain't No Other
June 22	Yo-Yo	You Better Ask Somebody
June 22	Intelligent Hoodlum	Tragedy: Saga of a Hoodlum
June 25	Poison Clan	Ruff Town Behavior
June 29	Various Artists	Poetic Justice (soundtrack)
June 29	Candyman	I Thought U Knew
June 29	Gumbo	Dropping Soulful H20 on the Fiber
June 29	Super Lover Cee & Casanova Rud	Blow Up the Spot
June 29	Lifers Group	Living Proof
July 1	Basehead	Not in Kansas Anymore
July 6	Akinyele	Vagina Diner
July 6	Ganksta N-I-P	Psychic Thoughts (Are What I Conceive?)
July 6	Mesanjarz of Funk	Mesanjarz of Funk
July 6	C.E.B.	Countin' Endless Bank
July 8	Tag Team	Whoomp! (There It Is)
July 12	Luke	In the Nude
July 13	Da King & I	Contemporary Jeep Music
July 13	Rumpletilskinz	What is a Rumpletilskin?
July 13	JT the Bigga Figga	Playaz N the Game
July 13	Mac Mall	Illegal Business?
July 13	Justin Warfield	My Field Trip to Planet 9
July 16	Insane Clown Posse	Beverly Kills 50187
July 20	Cypress Hill	Black Sunday
July 20	Dru Down	Fools from the Streets
July 20	Threat	Sickinnahead
July 20	Splack Pack	Uhh!! Ohh!!
July 27	Fat Joe da Gangsta	Represent
July 27	Pooh-Man	Judgement Day
August	T-Bone	Redeemed Hoodlum
August 3	Kris Kross	Da Bomb
August 10	Ultramagnetic MCs	The Four Horsemen
August 17	Eightball & MJG	Comin' Out Hard
August 17	Scarface	The World Is Yours
August 24	Tha Alkaholiks	21 & Over
August 24	Illegal	The Untold Truth
August 24	Private Investigators	Re-Act Like Ya Knew
August 24	Hoodratz	Sneeke Muthafukaz
September 14	Poor Righteous Teachers	Black Business
September 14	Various Artists	Judgment Night (soundtrack)
September 21	A.L.T.	Stone Cold World
September 21	Another Bad Creation	It Ain't What U Wear, It's How U Play It
September 21	De La Soul	Buhloone Mindstate
September 21	YZ	The Ghetto's Been Good to Me
September 28	Hi-C	Swing'n
September 28	KRS-One	Return of the Boom Bap
September 28	Lords of the Underground	Here Come the Lords
September 28	Souls of Mischief	93 'til Infinity
September 28	Spice 1	187 He Wrote
October 5	Digital Underground	The Body-Hat Syndrome
October 11	Totally Insane	Goin' Insane
October 12	DJ Jazzy Jeff & The Fresh Prince	Code Red
October 12	MF911	Idol, The Bloodsport
October 12	Salt-n-Pepa	Very Necessary
October 12	Leaders of the New School	T.I.M.E. (The Inner Mind's Eye)
October 19	Black Moon	Enta da Stage
October 19	Eazy-E	It's On (Dr. Dre) 187um Killa
October 19	Erick Sermon	No Pressure
October 26	Shaquille O'Neal	Shaq Diesel
October 26	Too Short	Get in Where You Fit In
October 26	Pudgee Tha Phat Bastard	Give 'Em The Finger
November 2	Daddy-O	You Can Be A Daddy, But Never Daddy-O
November 9	A Tribe Called Quest	Midnight Marauders
November 9	II D Extreme	II 2 Extreme
November 9	Jamalski	Roughneck Reality
November 9	K7	Swing Batta Swing
November 9	Brotha Lynch Hung	24 Deep
November 9	MC Shy D	The Comeback
November 9	Wu-Tang Clan	Enter the Wu-Tang (36 Chambers)
November 10	Too Short	Greatest Hits, Vol. 1: The Player Years, 1983–1988
November 16	Blood of Abraham	Future Profits
November 16	Das EFX	Straight Up Sewaside
November 16	MC Ren	Shock of the Hour
November 16	Queen Latifah	Black Reign
November 16	Us3	Hand on the Torch
November 16	YG'z	Street Nigga (EP)
November 23	Snoop Doggy Dogg	Doggystyle
November 23	Del the Funky Homosapien	No Need for Alarm
November 29	Kilo	Get Wit da Program
November 29	Mac Dre	Young Black Brotha
November 30	Sean T	Straight from the Streets
November 30	The Conscious Daughters	Ear to the Street
December 7	Domino	Domino
December 7	Ice Cube	Lethal Injection
December 21	Jodeci	Diary of a Mad Band
Unknown	187 Fac	The U.N.E.
Unknown	Bottom Posse	2 Saggin' Straight From Hell
Unknown	MC Luscious	Back to Boom
Unknown	San Quinn	Young Baby Boy (Don't Cross Me)
Unknown	Get Some Crew	Come Get Some
Unknown	Kool Keith and Godfather Don	Cenobites LP
Unknown	Arabian Prince	Where's My Bytches

== Highest-charting singles ==
Hip hop singles which charted in the Top 40 of the Billboard Hot 100
Title	Artist	Peak position
"Informer"	Snow featuring MC Shan	1
"Whoomp! (There It Is)"	Tag Team	2
"Nuthin' but a 'G' Thang"	Dr. Dre featuring Snoop Doggy Dogg	2
"Slam"	Onyx	4
"Shoop"	Salt-N-Pepa	4
"Mr. Wendal"	Arrested Development	6
"Fuck wit Dre Day (And Everybody's Celebratin')"	Dr. Dre featuring Snoop Doggy Dogg	8
"Hip Hop Hooray"	Naughty by Nature	8
"Ditty"	Paperboy	10
"I Get Around"	2Pac featuring Digital Underground	11
"Whoot, There It Is"	95 South	11
"Boom! Shake the Room"	DJ Jazzy Jeff & The Fresh Prince	13
"I Got a Man"	Positive K	14
"It Was a Good Day"	Ice Cube	15
"Rebirth of Slick (Cool Like Dat)"	Digable Planets	15
"Insane in the Brain"	Cypress Hill	19
"Girl I've Been Hurt"	Snow (musician)	19
"Alright"	Kris Kross featuring Supercat	19
"Check Yo Self"	Ice Cube featuring Das EFX	20
"Down with the King"	Run-D.M.C. featuring Pete Rock & CL Smooth	21
"Very Special (song)"	Big Daddy Kane featuring DJ Spinderella	31
"Let Me Ride"	Dr. Dre featuring Jewell & Snoop Doggy Dogg	34
"Ruffneck"	MC Lyte	35
"(I Know I Got) Skillz"	Shaquille O'Neal featuring Def Jef	35
"What's Up Doc? (Can We Rock)"	Fu-Schnickens featuring Shaquille O'Neal	39
"Six Feet Deep"	Geto Boys	40

== Highest first-week sales ==
List of top five albums with the highest first-week home market sales of 1993
Number	Album	Artist	1st-week sales	1st-week position	Refs
1	Doggystyle	Snoop Doggy Dogg	802,858	1	West Coast Hip Hop
2	Black Sunday	Cypress Hill	261,000	1	West Coast Hip Hop
3	Lethal Injection	Ice Cube	215,000	5	West Coast Hip Hop
4	It's On (Dr. Dre) 187um Killa	Eazy-E	110,600	5	West Coast Hip Hop

== See also ==
- Last article: 1992 in hip hop music
- Next article: 1994 in hip hop music
