= List of hip-hop musicians from Atlanta =

This is a list of hip-hop artists who were born or raised in Atlanta, Georgia and the surrounding suburban areas. Many of these artists continue to be a part of the Atlanta hip hop scene.

== Atlanta hip-hop artists ==
- 112
- 21 Savage
- 2 Chainz
- 6LACK
- Akon
- Alex Faith
- André 3000
- Anthony Preston
- Arrested Development
- Audio (B5)
- Baby D
- Bankroll Fresh
- Bankroll Mafia
- Big Boi
- Big Gipp
- Big Kuntry King
- Big Rube
- Bktherula
- Blood Raw
- Bobby Creekwater
- Bone Crusher
- Boyz n da Hood
- Bubba Sparxxx
- Camoflauge
- Cash Out
- Cee Lo Green
- Cherish
- Childish Gambino
- Christopher Massey
- Clan Destined
- Cool Breeze
- Count Bass D
- Crime Mob
- Cyber Sapp
- Cyhi the Prynce
- Da BackWudz
- Daron Jones
- Deante' Hitchcock
- Dear Jayne
- Dem Franchize Boyz
- Destroy Lonely
- Diamond
- Digital Nas
- DJ Burn One
- DJ Felli Fel
- DJ Lord
- DJ Spinz
- DJ Toomp
- Dolla
- Don Vito
- Donnis
- Drumma Boy
- Dun Deal
- Dungeon Family
- EarthGang
- Fabo
- Fast Life Yungstaz
- Field Mob
- Freak Nasty
- Future
- Ghetto Mafia
- Goodie Mob
- Gorilla Zoe
- Gucci Mane
- Gunna
- Hard Boyz
- Hoodrich Pablo Juan
- I-20
- ILoveMakonnen
- India.Arie
- Jagged Edge
- Jamia Simone Nash
- Jamie Grace
- Janelle Monáe
- Jarren Benton
- Jazze Pha
- Jeezy
- Jermaine Dupri
- The Jet Age of Tomorrow
- JID
- Jim Crow
- K Camp
- K.E. on the Track
- Kalenna Harper
- Kandi Burruss
- Kanye West
- Kap G
- Keisha Jackson
- Kelly Rowland
- Ken Carson
- Kenny Mason
- Keri Hilson
- Khujo
- Killer Mike
- Kilo Ali
- Kris Kross
- Kyle Massey
- Latto
- Lecrae
- Lil Baby
- Lil Gotit
- Lil Jon
- Lil Keed
- Lil Nas X
- Lil Reec
- Lil Ru
- Lil Scrappy
- Lil Yachty
- Lil Zane
- Lisa Lopes
- London on da Track
- Ludacris
- Lumberjacks
- MadeinTYO
- Major Damage
- Manchild
- Mario Judah
- MattyB
- Migos
- Mike Will Made It
- Money Man
- Mr. Collipark (DJ Smurf)
- The Mr. Move
- Mullage
- MLB Been1ne
- Nitti
- Nivea
- Offset
- OG Maco
- OMG Girlz
- Organized Noize
- Outkast
- Pastor Troy
- Pill
- The Platinum Brothers
- Playaz Circle
- Playboi Carti
- Polow da Don
- P$C
- Purple Ribbon All-Stars
- Quavo
- Rasheeda
- The Redland
- Rich Homie Quan
- Rich the Kid
- Rich Kidz
- RichGirl
- Rittz
- Rocko
- Rome Fortune
- Romeo
- Roscoe Dash
- Rubi Rose
- Russ
- SahBabii
- Scotty ATL
- Scrilla
- Sevyn Streeter
- Shawty Lo
- Shop Boyz
- Silentó
- Silk
- Sleepy Brown
- Slim
- SoFaygo
- Soulja Boy
- Soundz
- Southside
- Speech
- Spillage Village
- Stat Quo
- Supreeme
- Takeoff
- Taurus
- T.I.
- TLC
- T-Mo
- T'Melle
- Travis Porter
- Trillville
- Trinidad James
- Trouble
- Unk
- USDA
- Usher
- V.I.C.
- Waka Flocka Flame
- WDNG Crshrs
- We Are Toonz
- Xscape
- Y'all So Stupid
- YC
- YFN Lucci
- Ying Yang Twins
- YoungBloodZ
- Young Dro
- Young Nudy
- Young Scooter
- Young Thug
- Yung Joc
- Yung L.A.
- Yung Wun
- Zack Fox
- Zaytoven

== See also ==
- List of hip hop musicians
- List of people from Atlanta
