= Atlanta hip-hop =

Music genre

Atlanta hip-hop is a movement of hip-hop stemming from the music scene of Atlanta. In 2009, The New York Times called Atlanta "hip-hop's center of gravity". The city itself is home to many famous hip-hop, R&B, and neo soul musicians. The music style is considered to be very rich and varied.

== History ==
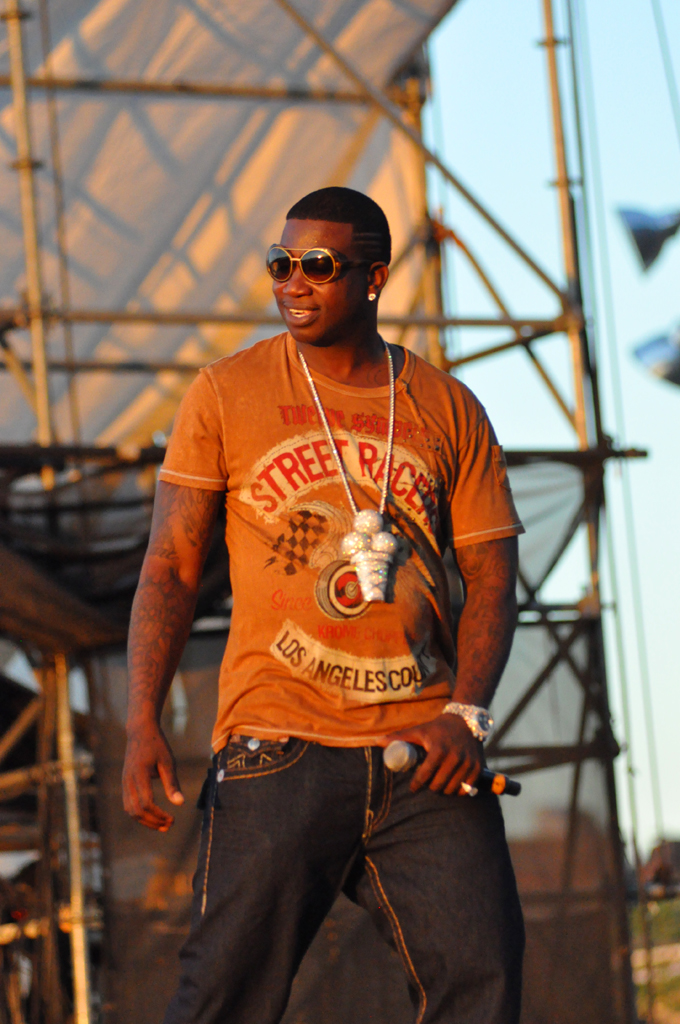
Gucci Mane

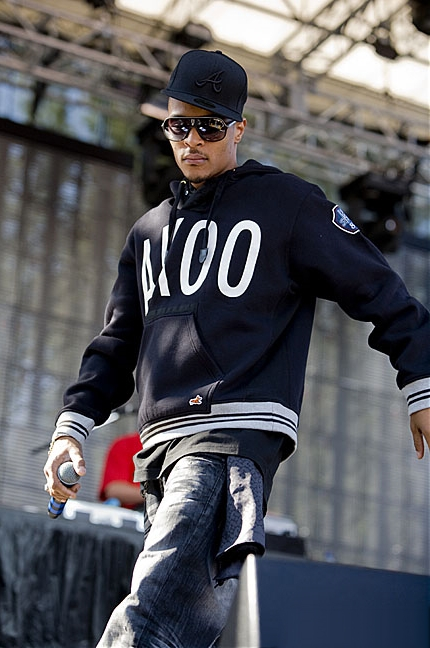
T.I.

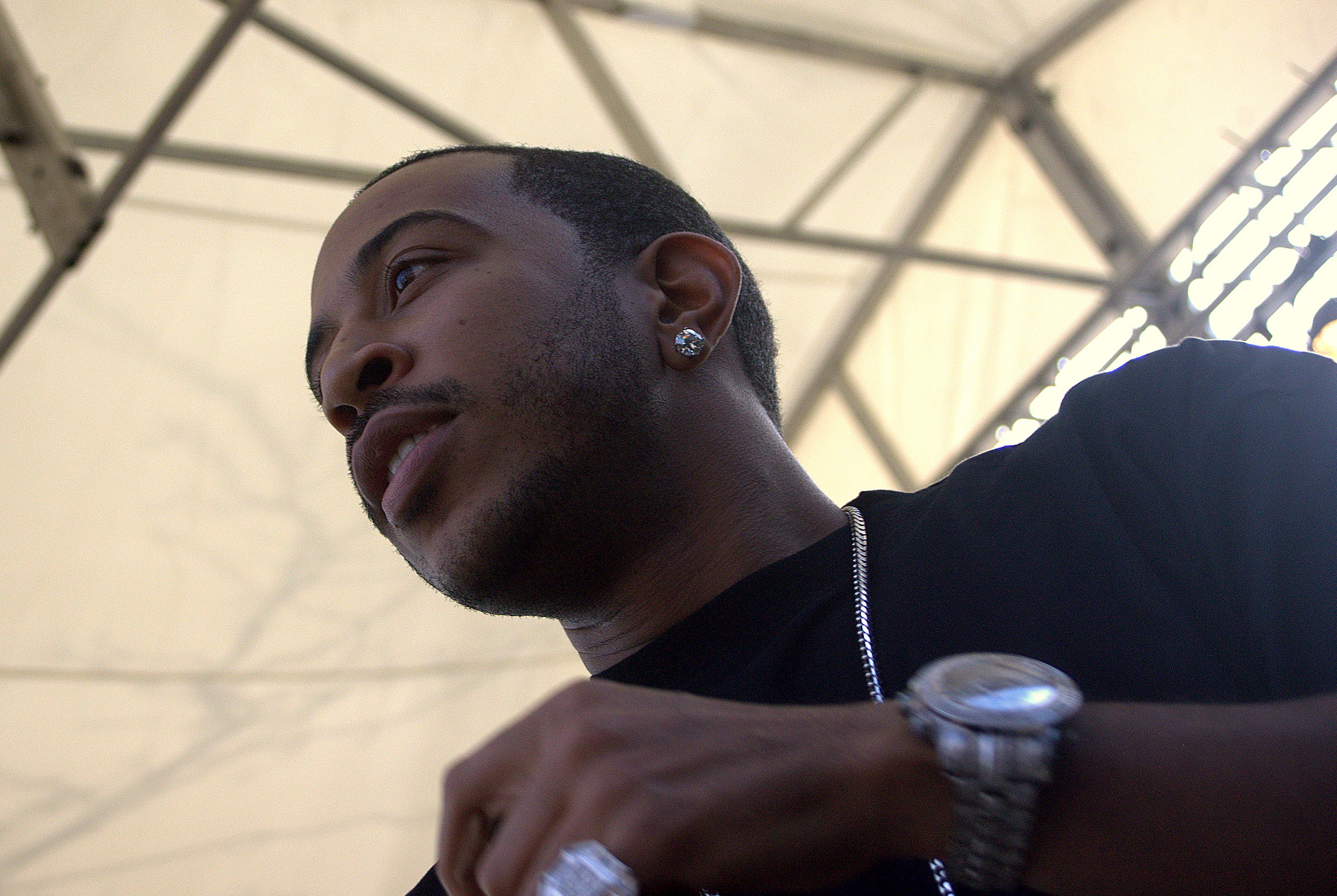
Ludacris

In the 1980s and early 1990s Atlanta's hip-hop scene was characterized by a local variant of Miami's electro-driven bass music, with stars like Kilo Ali, MC Shy-D, Raheem the Dream, and DJ Smurf (later Mr. Collipark). MC Shy-D is credited with bringing authentic Bronx-style hip-hop to Atlanta (and Miami), such as 1988's Shake it produced by DJ Toomp; Jones was signed to controversial Southern hip-hop label Luke Records, run by Luther Campbell aka "Uncle Luke". Arrested Development won a Grammy Award in 1992 with "Tennessee", while Kris Kross won with their hit song "Jump". The group Tag Team released their debut platinum certified album Whoomp! (There It Is) on July 20, 1993, spawned by their hit single of the same name. However, Organized Noize and Dungeon Family "cornerstone" Rico Wade, who even produced albums for Outkast, Goodie Mob and Future, was considered to be a major architect of Atlanta hip-hop. Numerous aspiring musicians and artists would in fact record music in the studio which was located in the basement of Wade's mother, and which became known as the "Dungeon."

By the mid-1990s, the rise of LaFace Records artists Outkast, Goodie Mob and the production collective Organized Noize led to the development of the Dirty South style of hip-hop and of Atlanta gaining a reputation for "soul-minded hip-hop eccentrics", contrasting with other regional styles. While Atlanta-area hip-hop artists were from the suburban Decatur area, their prominence was eclipsed by music associated with these artists from "The S.W.A.T.S." ("Southwest Atlanta, too strong"), i.e. Southwest Atlanta, plus territory extending into the adjacent cities of College Park and East Point. The term "SWATS" came into vogue around 1996, initially made popular by Outkast and Goodie Mob.

From the late 1990s to early 2000s, record producer Lil Jon became a driving force behind the hip-hop subgenre known as crunk, known for its upbeat and club-oriented hip-hop sound. Record producers L.A. Reid and Babyface founded LaFace Records in Atlanta in the late-1980s; the label eventually became the home to multi-platinum selling artists such as Toni Braxton, TLC, Ciara. It is also the home of So So Def Recordings, a label founded by Jermaine Dupri in the mid-1990s, that signed acts such as Da Brat, Jagged Edge, Xscape and Dem Franchise Boyz. The success of LaFace and SoSo Def led to Atlanta as an established scene for record labels such as LaFace parent company Arista Records to set up satellite offices.

In 2009 The New York Times noted that after 2000, Atlanta moved "from the margins to becoming hip-hop's center of gravity, part of a larger shift in hip-hop innovation to the South." Atlanta hip-hop's pop breakthrough—everyone from Jermaine Dupri to OutKast to Lil Jon—involved the blend of various distillations of hard-core sounds from the West, bass beats from Florida, and styles and images from the North. Producer Drumma Boy called Atlanta "the melting pot of the South". Producer Fatboi called the Roland TR-808 ("808") synthesizer "central" to the Music of Atlanta's versatility, used for snap, crunk, trap, and pop rap styles. The same article named Fatboi, Shawty Redd, and Zaytoven the "hottest producers driving the city". By the 2010s, Atlanta rap (also known as Trap) had become the dominant genre of the rap game. Rappers such as Gucci Mane, Migos, Young Thug, Lil Baby, 21 Savage, T.I. and Gunna became household names while shaping the mainstream rap industry. Producers such as Metro Boomin, Mike Will Made It and Zaytoven also contributed to the rise of trap.

Atlanta hip-hop has influenced other mainstream forms of media. The television show Atlanta, which chronicles the lives of two cousins as they navigate the hip-hop world, exemplifies this broader impact. It has earned two Golden Globe awards and two Emmy awards. A number of Atlanta-based artists, including Killer Mike and Jermaine Dupri, have also become involved in local and national political movements.

== Top-selling artists ==
Local multi-platinum artists include Ludacris, Ciara, B.o.B, Outkast, T.I., and Jeezy. The following hip-hop, rap, R&B, and soul artists have had #1 or #2 albums or singles on the U.S. Hot 100 chart:

| Artist | Year | Rank | Single name | Year | Rank | Album name |
|---|---|---|---|---|---|---|
| 21 Savage | 2017–2022 | 1 | 2 #1 singles | 2018–2024 | 1 | 4 #1 albums |
| B.o.B | 2010 | 1 | Nothin' on You | 2010 | 1 | B.o.B Presents: The Adventures of Bobby Ray |
| CeeLo Green | 2010 | 2 | Fuck You! | | | |
| Childish Gambino | 2018 | 1 | This Is America | | | |
| D4L | 2006 | 1 | Laffy Taffy | | | |
| Future | 2021–2024 | 1 | 3 #1 singles | 2015–2024 | 1 | 10 #1 albums |
| Gnarls Barkley (CeeLo Green/Danger Mouse collaboration) | 2006 | 2 | Crazy | | | |
| Gucci Mane | 2016 | 1 | Black Beatles | | | |
| Gunna | | | | 2020–2022 | 1 | 3 #1 albums |
| Kris Kross | 1992–1995 | 1 | 4 #1 singles | 1992 | 1 | Totally Krossed Out |
| Jeezy | 2008 | 1 | Love In This Club | 2006–2016 | 2 | 3 #1 albums |
| Lil Baby | 2021–2022 | 2 | 2 #2 singles | 2020–2022 | 1 | 3 #1 albums |
| Lil Jon | 2004 | 2 | Get Low | | | |
| Lil Nas X | 2018–2021 | 1 | 3 #1 singles | 2021 | 2 | Montero |
| Lloyd | 2009 | 2 | BedRock | 2007 | 2 | Street Love |
| Ludacris | 2003–2006 | 1 | 5 #1 singles | 2003–2010 | 1 | 4 #1 albums |
| Migos | 2016 | 1 | Bad & Boujee | 2017–2018 | 1 | 2 #1 albums |
| Outkast | 2000–2003 | 1 | 3 #1 singles | 2003 | 1 | Speakerboxxx/The Love Below |
| Playboi Carti | 2024 | 1 | Carnival | 2020-2025 | 1 | 2 #1 Albums |
| Quavo | 2017 | 1 | I'm the One | 2018 | 2 | Quavo Huncho |
| Rich the Kid | 2024 | 1 | Carnival | 2018 | 2 | The World Is Yours |
| Shop Boyz | 2007 | 2 | Party Like a Rockstar | | | |
| Tag Team | 1993 | 2 | Whoomp! (There It Is) | | | |
| T.I. | 2006–2013 | 1 | 4 #1 singles | 2006–2008 | 1 | 3 #1 albums |
| The-Dream | | | | 2009 | 2 | Love vs. Money |
| Usher | 1998–2010 | | 9 #1 singles | 2004–2012 | | 4 #1 albums |
| Ying Yang Twins | 2003 | 2 | Get Low | 2005 | 2 | U.S.A. (United State of Atlanta) |
| Young Thug | 2017–2021 | 1 | 3 #1 singles | 2019–2021 | 1 | 3 #1 albums |

== See also ==
- Crunk music
- List of hip-hop musicians from Atlanta
- Snap music
- Southern hip-hop
- Trap music
- Memphis rap
