= Play with Toys =

Studio album by Basehead
- Released: 1992
- Genre: Alternative hip hop
- Length: 40:59
- Label: Imago
- Producer: Michael Ivey

Basehead chronology
Play with Toys (1992)	Not in Kansas Anymore (1993)

Play with Toys is the debut album by American alternative hip hop group Basehead. It was voted one of the top 50 albums of 1992 in Q, and listed as number 43 in NME's top albums of 1992.

== Music and lyrics ==
The music style of Play with Toys fuses elements of rock, blues, funk, hip hop, pop, psychedelic and reggae, and was described as an alternative hip hop "cult favorite". David Jeffries described Play with Toys as "slacker rap". According to Michael Ivey, "There are hip-hop elements in there, but if a hardcore hip-hop fan bought it, they might be disappointed". Ivey also stated that Basehead's music "doesn't have the expected samples and sounds." The lyrical themes of Play with Toys focus on diverse subjects, including alcohol and marijuana use, depression, philosophy, politics, and relationship breakups. Francis Davis wrote that Ivey's lyrics "[subvert] both rock music and gangsta-rap conventions." The instrumentation of Play with Toys was created largely with live instruments rather than samples, which differentiates the album's sound from that of mainstream hip hop. Instruments were altered with studio techniques for effect, and Ivey altered the pitch of his voice for sketches in which he voiced the friends of the album's protagonist. Ivey's vocals mix singing and rapping.

== Reception ==
Professional ratings
Review scores
Source	Rating
AllMusic	4/5 stars
Chicago Tribune	4/4 stars
Christgau's Consumer Guide	(3-star Honorable Mention)
The Encyclopedia of Popular Music	4/5 stars
Q	3/5 stars
Rolling Stone	4/5 stars
Spin Alternative Record Guide	9/10

Rolling Stone reviewer Kevin Powell wrote that "Without being preachy, Basehead's unconventional style challenges listeners to get beyond their basic instincts and open their minds, search their souls."

== Track listing ==
All tracks are written by Michael Ivey.

No.	Title	Length
1.	"Intro"	1:02
2.	"2000 BC"	4:15
3.	"Brand New Day"	4:52
4.	"Not Over You"	4:38
5.	"Better Days"	3:09
6.	"Ode to My Favorite Beer"	3:42
7.	"Hair"	3:48
8.	"Evening News"	4:37
9.	"I Try"	3:53
10.	"Play with Toys"	4:03
11.	"Outro"	2:56
Total length:		40:59

== Personnel ==
- Michael Ivey – guitar, vocals
- Brian Hendrix – live drums
- Bruce 'Kool Aid' Gardner – live drums on "2000 BC"
- Paul 'DJ Unique' Howard – scratches
- Bob Dewald – bass on "Play with Toys"
- Marco Delmar – feedback solo on "Play with Toys"
