= Getto Jam =

1993 single by American rapper Domino

Single by Domino

from the album Domino
- B-side: "Jam"
- Released: November 16, 1993
- Recorded: 1993
- Studio: Skip Saylor (Hollywood, CA)
- Genre: Hip hop
- Length: 4:18
- Label: Outburst Records
- Songwriters: Shawn Ivy; Kevin Gilliam
- Producers: DJ Battlecat; Domino (co-)

Domino singles chronology
"Getto Jam" (1993)	"Sweet Potatoe Pie" (1994)

Music video
- "Getto Jam" on YouTube

"Getto Jam" is a song performed by American rapper Domino. It was released on November 16, 1993, through Outburst Records, as the lead single from his debut studio album, Domino (1993). Written by Domino and DJ Battlecat, it was recorded at Skip Saylor in Hollywood and produced by Battlecat with co-production from Domino.

In the United States, the single reached No. 7 on the Billboard Hot 100, No. 4 on the Hot R&B/Hip-Hop Songs chart, and No. 1 on the Hot Rap Songs chart. It was certified gold by the Recording Industry Association of America on January 5, 1994, for selling 500,000 copies. It peaked at No. 25 in New Zealand and No. 33 on the UK Singles Chart. The accompanying music video was directed by William Boyd.

The song has appeared on several of Def Jam's greatest hits compilations including 1995's Def Jam Music Group Inc.: 10th Year Anniversary and 1997's Total Def Jam. It was also later used in the 1994 film House Party 3, 1995 film Losing Isaiah, and 1999 film In Too Deep.

== Critical reception ==
Charles Aaron from Spin wrote in his review of the single, "The way he croons and caresses his dirty words (like Spoonie Gee's 'Loverap'), Domino gives you the impression he raps because he's a so-so singer. Thing is, I like his rapping best because he's a so-so singer."

== Track listing ==
No.	Title	Length
1.	"Getto Jam" (LP Version)	4:18
2.	"Getto Jam" (Radio Edit)	4:19
3.	"Getto Jam" (Instrumental)	4:41
4.	"Jam" (LP Version)	3:50

== Personnel ==
- Shawn "Domino" Ivy — rapping vocals, songwriter, co-producer, keyboards (strings)
- Kevin "Battlecat" Gilliam — keyboards, programming, songwriter, producer, mixing
- Robert "Fonksta" Bacon — guitar, bass
- Louie Teran — engineering
- Sean Freehill — mixing
- Wallace "Wally T." Traugott — mastering
- Anthony "Anti" Lewis — executive producer
- "Big Bass" Brian Walker — executive producer
- Greedy Greg — executive producer

== Charts ==
=== Weekly charts ===
Chart (1993–1994)	Peak position
Canada Retail Singles (The Record)	3
New Zealand (Recorded Music NZ)	25
UK Singles (Official Charts)	33
UK Airplay (Music Week)	30
US Billboard Hot 100	7
US Hot R&B/Hip-Hop Songs (Billboard)	4
US Hot Rap Songs (Billboard)	1
US Maxi-Singles Sales (Billboard)	1
US Cash Box Top 100	11

=== Year-end charts ===
Chart (1994)	Position
US Hot R&B/Hip-Hop Songs (Billboard)	30
US Maxi-Singles Sales (Billboard)	12

== Certifications ==
Region	Certification	Certified units/sales
United States (RIAA)	Gold	500,000^{^}
^{^} Shipments figures based on certification alone.
