= Time Capsule (Marxman album) =

Studio album by Marxman
- Released: 4 November 1996
- Genre: Hip Hop
- Length: 62:12
- Label: More Rockers
- Producer: Various

Marxman chronology
33 Revolutions per Minute (1993)	Time Capsule (1996)

Professional ratings
Review scores
Source	Rating
The Encyclopedia of Popular Music	2/5 stars
Muzik	3/5 stars

Time Capsule is Marxman's second and final album. It was released in the United Kingdom on 4 November 1996. It is considered to be angrier, but musically more conservative, than their debut album, 33 Revolutions per Minute. The band disbanded after releasing the album, with Oisin Lunny going on to have limited success as a solo artist. Time Capsule failed to chart.

== Critical reception ==
The Irish Times called the album "introspective in mood and tone, mixing some beautifully soulful touches with everything from guitar to swing."

== Track listing ==
1. "Dazed and Confused" - 4:47
2. "Time Capsule" - 7:03
3. "No More Time" - 3:42
4. "A House Called Serenity" - 5:29
5. "A Day in the Life of..." - 4:26
6. "What's in the Basket?" - 5:11
7. "Scenes in My Mind" - 5:40
8. "Vermillion Shag" - 5:59
9. "Backs Against the Wall" - 3:47
10. "Whassinit? For the Cynic" - 5:01
11. "Heart Still Feels the Pain" - 4:34
12. "Slippin' Away" - 6:28

== Credits ==
All the songs on the album were written by band members Hollis Byrne, Stephen Brown and Oisin Lunny. They were scratched by DJ K One.
