= Basehead =

American band

- Also known as: dc Basehead, Basehead 2.0
- Origin: Washington, D.C., U.S.
- Genres: Alternative rock, alternative hip hop
- Years active: 1992–present
- Labels: Imago, Union of Vineyard Workers
- Members: Michael Ivey; Aaron Burroughs; Brendan Ciotta
- Past members: Bill Conway; Keith Lofton; Clarence "Citizen Cope" Greenwood; Brian Hendrix; Jay Nichols; Aaron Burroughs
- Website: baseheadmusic.com

Basehead, also known as dc Basehead and Basehead 2.0, is an American alternative hip hop and rock group formed by Michael Ivey in 1992. Ivey serves as the group's songwriter and leader, performing vocals and various instruments. Basehead's 1992 debut album, Play with Toys, was recorded at Ivey's home with various studio musicians. Ivey formed a touring band for live performances, which contributed to Basehead's second album, Not in Kansas Anymore. The group's current lineup consists of Ivey, drummer Aaron Burroughs and bassist Brendan Ciotta.

Basehead has received praise for its distinctive sound and lyrics. The group's music incorporates elements of various genres, including blues, funk, hip hop and rock. The lyrics of Play with Toys and Not in Kansas Anymore focus on subjects such as alcohol and cannabis use, depression, philosophy, politics and relationships. Beginning with the 1996 release of Faith, the group's lyrics have focused primarily on Christian themes, which carried over to its albums In the Name of Jesus, dc Basehead and Rockalyptic Music.

== History ==
Basehead released its debut album, Play with Toys, in 1992 on the small independent label Emigre. Vocalist Michael Ivey recorded much of the album at his home on a four-track with various friends. The album received favorable reviews and frequent airplay on college radio. Rolling Stone reviewer Kevin Powell wrote that "Without being preachy, Basehead's unconventional style challenges listeners to get beyond their basic instincts and open their minds, search their souls." Assembling a five-member touring band, Ivey toured the United States and Europe, opening for the Beastie Boys, Stone Temple Pilots, and Ween. After College Music Journal featured Basehead on its cover, the group received attention from major labels, and signed with Imago Records, a former subsidiary of BMG the following year, releasing its second studio album, Not in Kansas Anymore. Rolling Stone reviewer Danyel Smith called the album "an alternative to the benign bullshit music that floods the chain stores and commercial radio waves." Stephen Thomas Erlewine wrote that "Although it retains many of the same qualities of their critically acclaimed debut [...] there's nothing that has the same sense of discovery that made Play with Toys an interesting record."

In April 1994, Basehead recorded its third studio album, Faith, which retained the musical elements of previous albums, but featured lyrics focusing on religious themes. During this period, Ivey also formed a side project, Bastard Youth of Basehead, also known as B.Y.O.B., and founded I3Records, an imprint of Rykodisc Records focusing on alternative music aimed at and produced by African American musicians. In December 1994, Imago separated from BMG, and Faith was not released until two years later. The album's release problems resulted in the cancellation of a planned tour between Basehead and B.Y.O.B. Although some band members felt that they had not been given proper financial compensation for their work, Ivey stated that he took a smaller percentage of the songwriting credits than he was legally entitled to, and that the group's underpaid work would have "laid the groundwork" for future success if Faith did not have release problems.

In 1998, Basehead released its fourth studio album, In the Name of Jesus on the label Union of Vineyard Workers. In 2002 the group changed its name to dc Basehead, releasing their self-titled fifth album on November 19. Hamlin wrote that "the mastermind's [...] effective use of subtly shifting patterns inside a repeating framework, and his talented co-conspirators lift DC into distinction." Reforming as Basehead 2.0, the group released its sixth studio album, Rockalyptic Music in 2007.

== Music and lyrics ==
The cover of Play with Toys depicts an opened beer bottle, signifying alcohol use, one of the album's reoccurring themes.

Basehead's musical style, which fuses elements of blues, funk, hip hop, pop, psychedelic, reggae, rock and rhythm and blues, is categorized as "black rock", "alternative funk", "alternative dance", "progressive rap", alternative hip hop and alternative rock. David Jeffries from Allmusic described Play with Toys as "slacker rap". According to Michael Ivey, "There are hip-hop elements in there, but if a hardcore hip-hop fan bought it, they might be disappointed". Ivey also stated that Basehead's music "doesn't have the expected samples and sounds." The lyrical themes of Play with Toys and Not in Kansas Anymore focus on diverse subjects, including alcohol and marijuana use, depression, philosophy, politics, racism, and relationship breakups. Francis Davis wrote that Ivey's lyrics "[subvert] both rock and gangsta-rap conventions." Basehead's albums and performances feature live instrumentation, which differentiates the group's sound from that of mainstream hip hop artists who rely solely on sampled instrumentation. On the group's albums, vocals and instruments are altered with studio techniques for effect. Ivey's vocals mix singing and rapping. According to Ivey, Basehead's former DJ, Citizen Cope, "doesn't play music. He makes sounds—[he's] an instrument in his own self. He might scratch certain words for a special effect."

In 1994, the group's lyrics shifted to Christian themes, starting with the album Faith. Andrew Hamlin describes the lyrics of Faith as having "caught Ivey mid-capitulation. He wanted Jesus in his life but he also wanted his beer, his pot, his television, and his lust." During the release of Faith, Ivey stated that Basehead's fourth studio album, In the Name of Jesus, would feature even more Christian-oriented lyrics than Faith. Regarding the lyrics of In the Name of Jesus, Hamlin writes that "chanting praises leaves the Basehead mastermind without his characteristic wit, and he lacks the energetic exhortations that often lift gospel performers above sameness in material." Regarding dc Basehead, Hamlin wrote that the album's lyrics were "miles in some direction or other from any stereotyped Christian rock bin."

During a performance in which the group received a request for early material, Ivey stated "I'm still trying to work it out—how to follow God and still give you the old shit" and introduced the group's Christian songs with self-deprecation, referring to the songs as "the new, reborn, love-God Basehead stuff." In a 1998 interview, Ivey stated "I'm kind of wary of the Church. I know there's this whole Christian music market, but I don't think, theology-wise, I'm in agreement with a whole lot of Christians. [...] In fact, I don't know whether I like even being called a Christian."

== Pop culture ==
Two Basehead songs, "Play with Toys" and "2000," were featured in the Union Wheels skateboarding video titled "Right to Skate", during the Alphonzo Rawls segment.

== Band members ==
- Michael Ivey — guitar, vocals
- Aaron Burroughs — drums
- Brendan Ciotta — bass

Former

- Bill Conway — bass
- Keith "Lazy K" Lofton — guitar
- Clarence "Citizen Cope" Greenwood — turntables, bass
- Brian Hendrix — drums
- Jay Nichols — drums
- Peter Van Allen, Jr — drums, programming / sampling

== Discography ==
- Play with Toys (1992)
- Not in Kansas Anymore (1993)
- Faith (1996)
- In the Name of Jesus (1998)
- dc Basehead (2002)
- Rockalyptic Music (2007)
