= Physical Funk (song) =

Single by Domino

from the album Physical Funk
- B-side: "Do You Qualify"
- Released: February 6, 1996
- Recorded: 1995
- Genre: Hip hop
- Length: 3:33
- Label: Outburst Records
- Songwriter: Shawn Ivy
- Producer: Domino

Domino singles chronology
"Tales from the Hood" (1995)	"Physical Funk" (1996)	"So Fly" (1996)

"Physical Funk" is a song written, performed and produced by American rapper Domino. It was released on February 6, 1996 through Outburst Records as the lead single from his second studio album Physical Funk.

"Physical Funk" became Domino's final single to reach the Billboard Hot 100, peaking at #87, though it found better success on the Hot Rap Singles where it peaked at 11.

A promotional music video was released for the song that featured Domino parodying Sir Mix-a-Lot's "Baby Got Back", Tone Lōc's "Wild Thing", Michael and Janet Jackson's "Scream" and Coolio's "Fantastic Voyage".

== Track listing ==
=== A-Side ===
1. "Physical Funk" (Radio Edit)
2. "Physical Funk" (Instrumental)

=== B-Side ===
1. "Physical Funk" (LP Mix)
2. "Do You Qualify?"
3. "Physical Funk" (Acapella)

== Charts ==
Chart (1996)	Peak position
US Billboard Hot 100	87
US Hot R&B/Hip-Hop Songs (Billboard)	46
US R&B/Hip-Hop Airplay (Billboard)	65
US Hot Rap Songs (Billboard)	11
