= Crooked Officer =

1993 single by Geto Boys

Single by Geto Boys

from the album Till Death Do Us Part
- Released: January 13, 1993
- Studio: Jungle Style (Houston, Texas); Digital Services (Houston, TX)
- Genre: Political hip-hop
- Length: 3:59
- Label: Rap-A-Lot; Priority
- Songwriters: Brad Jordan; Michael Barnett; Christopher Barriere; Joseph Johnson
- Producers: N.O. Joe; John Bido; Tony Randle

Geto Boys singles chronology
"Ain't with Being Broke" (1991)	"Crooked Officer" (1993)	"Six Feet Deep" (1993)

Music video
- "Crooked Officer" on YouTube

"Crooked Officer" is a song by American hip-hop group Geto Boys, released on January 13, 1993 as the lead single from their fourth studio album Till Death Do Us Part (1993). It was produced by N.O. Joe, John Bido and Tony Randle.

== Background ==
The song was written by the Convicts, a hip hop duo consisting of rappers Lord 3-2 and Big Mike, at a time when Suge Knight was looking to sign them to Death Row Records. Dr. Dre produced the song and considered including it on his album The Chronic, but relented, possibly due to objection from Interscope Records. Big Mike took the song's concept and lyrics back to Rap-A-Lot Records, where it was later revised for the Geto Boys.

== Composition ==
The song contains guitar and organ in the production. It protests against police brutality and corruption, as the group expresses frustration with abusive officers and makes accusations. Big Mike notably raps in the chorus, "Mr. Officer, crooked officer / I wanna put yo ass in a coffin, sir" (on the single version, this was changed to "Mr. Officer, crooked officer / Why you wanna put me in a coffin, sir?").

== Charts ==
Chart (1993)	Peak position
US Bubbling Under Hot 100 (Billboard)	11
US Hot R&B/Hip-Hop Songs (Billboard)	70
US Hot Rap Songs (Billboard)	4
