= Faith (Basehead album) =

Studio album by Basehead
- Released: 1996
- Studio: Pachyderm (Cannon Falls, Minnesota)
- Genre: Hip hop, alternative rock
- Label: Imago
- Producer: Michael Ivey

Basehead chronology
Not in Kansas Anymore (1993)	Faith (1996)	In the Name of Jesus (1998)

Faith is the third album by the American hip hop group Basehead, released in 1996. The release was delayed for two years as Imago Records separated from BMG. It was the group's last album for the label.

== Production ==
The album was recorded in 1994 at Pachyderm Recording Studio, in Minnesota, with engineering help from Michael Koppelman; Koppelman and DJ Clarence Greenwood also coproduced some of the tracks. The lyrics, written by Michael Ivey, address themes of Christian spirituality and God; "Lucy" is a song about Lucifer.

== Critical reception ==
Professional ratings
Review scores
Source	Rating
AllMusic	2.5/5 stars
The Encyclopedia of Popular Music	3/5 stars
Entertainment Weekly	A−
Fort Worth Star-Telegram	3.5/5 stars
MusicHound R&B: The Essential Album Guide	3/5 stars
Orange County Register	4/5 stars

Entertainment Weekly deemed the album "avant-Christian funk", writing that Ivey "hasn't curtailed his humor, his drawling sensuality, or his sense of musical adventure." The Washington City Paper advised: "Imagine a mellow Prince quietly declaiming over the late-night vibes of a cafe ensemble comfortable with jazz balladry, triphop, sadcore, and cutting-edge hiphop." The Orange County Register called it "a brilliant blend of social observation, lo-fi hip-hop, twisted jazz, clever avant-rock, and smart old school that cuts very, very deep."

CMJ New Music Monthly thought that "some songs lilt and others throb, but Faith still has the arid, rustic sound that distinguishes Basehead's records from any others in hip-hop." The Fort Worth Star-Telegram determined that Ivey's "spiritual lyrics have matured without getting pompous", writing that the frontman is "the guy who pretty much founded that whole 'alternative rap' movement—a commingling of rap, reggae, country and R&B that Arrested Development, the Fugees and others swiped and made nice careers out of—and still he lingers in the shadows of obscurity."

AllMusic wrote that Ivey "didn't leave behind his trademark amalgam of funk, hip-hop, and kitschy pop but he has become more focused... Unfortunately, you don't listen to Basehead to hear direction—Ivey's charm has always been in his fragmented, hazy cut-and-paste approach."

== Track listing ==
All tracks are written by Michael Ivey

No.	Title	Length
1.	"If I Were Superman"
2.	"Cold Outside"
3.	"Faith"
4.	"Castles & Kings"
5.	"Ask Your Dad"
6.	"Fun Tube"
7.	"Betty Ford & a Brand New Bag"
8.	"Lucy"
9.	"Objects in the First Person"
10.	"Fives & Fours & Friend of Friends"
11.	"Saved"
12.	"Spreading Germs"
13.	"The Son Does Shine"
14.	"Family Man"
