= Domino (Domino album) =

Studio album by Domino
- Released: December 7, 1993
- Recorded: 1992–1993
- Studio: Skip Saylor (Hollywood, CA)
- Genre: West Coast hip hop; G-funk
- Length: 41:04
- Label: Outburst
- Producer: DJ Battlecat; AMG

Domino chronology
Domino (1993)	Physical Funk (1996)

Singles from Domino
- 1. "Getto Jam" Released: November 5, 1993; 2. "Sweet Potatoe Pie" Released: March 8, 1994; 3. "Money Is Everything" Released: July 5, 1994; 4. "Long Beach Thang" Released: October 25, 1994

Domino is the debut studio album by American rapper Domino. It was released on December 7, 1993, through Outburst Records with distribution via Rush Associated Labels/Chaos Recordings. The recording sessions took place at Skip Saylor Recording in Hollywood. The album was produced by DJ Battlecat, as well as AMG and Domino, with Anthony "Anti" Lewis, Greedy Greg and Big Bass Brian Walker served as executive producers. It features guest appearances from AMG and Poppa LQ (then known as Laquan).

The album made it to number 39 on Billboard 200 and number 10 on the Top R&B/Hip-Hop Albums. It was certified gold by the Recording Industry Association of America on March 1, 1994. Its lead single, "Getto Jam", peaked at No. 7 on the Billboard Hot 100, topped the Hot Rap Songs, and went gold on January 5, 1994, for selling 500,000 units in the United States. The second single off of the album, "Sweet Potatoe Pie", reached No. 27 on the Billboard Hot 100 and No. 3 on the Hot Rap Songs.

== Critical reception ==
Professional ratings
Review scores
Source	Rating
AllMusic	4/5 stars
Los Angeles Times	3/4 stars
MusicHound Rock: The Essential Album Guide	3/5 stars
RapReviews	8/10
The Source	3.5/5 stars

The Washington Post concluded that "there's some sex talk but little of the bitch-ho mentality; overall, it's a less bass-heavy, sonically lighter shade of funk." The Los Angeles Times noted that "Domino's rapping voice is slightly sing-songy, slightly nasal, a flexible instrument that insinuates itself into the grooves like a riffing alto sax; the hooks in the songs come from the implied melodic cadences in the rhymes." Josh Levine of The Source liked the album, also highlighting Domino's "unique singing style" and comparing him to Toddy Tee and the members of the Pharcyde.

== Track listing ==
No.	Title	Producer(s)	Length
1.	"Diggady Domino"	DJ Battlecat	4:15
2.	"Getto Jam"	DJ Battlecat; Domino (co.)	4:17
3.	"A.F.D."	DJ Battlecat	4:07
4.	"Do You Qualify"	DJ Battlecat	3:34
5.	"Jam"	DJ Battlecat	3:50
6.	"Money Is Everything"	DJ Battlecat	4:21
7.	"Sweet Potatoe Pie"	DJ Battlecat	3:29
8.	"Raincoat"	DJ Battlecat	4:26
9.	"Long Beach Thang"	DJ Battlecat	5:15
10.	"That's Real" (featuring AMG and Laquan)	AMG	3:30
Total length:			41:04

Sample credits

- Track 4 contains a sample from "Summer Madness" written by Alton Taylor, Robert Mickens, Ronald Bell, Dennis Thomas, Ricky West, George Brown, Claydes Charles Smith and Robert Bell as recorded by Kool & the Gang
- Track 10 contains a sample from "Funky Worm" written by Greg Webster, Marvin Pierce, N. Napier, Andrew Noland, Leroy Bonner, Ralph Middlebrooks, Walter Morrison and Marshall Jones as recorded by the Ohio Players
- The title track contains a sample of "Sing a Simple Song", by Sly and the Family Stone

== Personnel ==
- Shawn Antoine Ivy – main artist, co-producer (track 2)
- AMG – featured artist & producer (track 10)
- LaQuan – featured artist (track 10)
- Kevin "Battlecat" Gilliam – keyboards & producer (tracks: 1–9), talkbox (track 7), programming & mixing
- Robert "Fonksta" Bacon – guitar (tracks: 1, 2, 4, 5, 9), bass (tracks: 1, 2), keyboards (track 3)
- Sean Freehill – mixing
- Louie Teran – engineering
- Wallace "Wally T." Traugott – mastering
- Anthony "Anti" Lewis – executive producer
- "Big Bass" Brian Walker – executive producer
- Greedy Greg – executive producer
- The Drawing Board – art direction
- Michael Miller – photography

== Charts ==
Chart (1994)	Peak position
US Billboard 200	39
US Top R&B/Hip-Hop Albums (Billboard)	10

== Certifications ==
Region	Certification	Certified units/sales
United States (RIAA)	Gold	500,000^{^}
^{^} Shipments figures based on certification alone.
