= D-Freaked It =

2001 album by Domino

Studio album by Domino
- Released: June 19, 2001
- Recorded: 1998
- Genre: Hip hop
- Length: 49:33
- Label: Slipdisc Records
- Producer: Domino

Domino chronology
Remember Me? (1999)	D-Freaked It (2001)	Domination (2004)

D-Freaked It is the fifth album released by Domino. It was released on June 19, 2001, for Big Whale Records and was produced by Domino. After two unsuccessful albums in a row, (Dominology and Remember Me?) this marked Domino's return to the Billboard charts, peaking at No. 95 on the Top R&B/Hip –Hop Albums chart.

== Track listing ==
1. "Intro" – 1:35
2. "Like That" – 3:49
3. "Parking Lot Pimpin'" – 4:19
4. "Dollar Bill Shit" – 4:06
5. "Flossin'" – 4:22
6. "Chocolate Girl" – 4:26
7. "10 Toes Up" – 3:50
8. "Unphuckwitable" – 3:57
9. "4 My Peeps" – 4:43
10. "G Spot Touchin'" – 4:46
11. "Don't Hate Me" – 3:20 (Featuring Krishna Das)
12. "Brand New" – 4:11
13. "D-Freaked It" – 4:33
14. "Like That" (Icon mix) – 3:50
