= Physical Funk =

Studio album by Domino
- Released: June 11, 1996
- Recorded: late 1994 – 1995
- Studio: Skip Saylor Recording (Hollywood, CA); Blue Palm Recording
- Genre: West Coast hip hop; G-funk
- Length: 45:10
- Label: Outburst
- Producer: Domino

Domino chronology
Domino (1993)	Physical Funk (1996)	Dominology (1997)

Singles from Physical Funk
- 1. "Physical Funk" Released: February 6, 1996; 2. "So Fly" Released: May 28, 1996

Professional ratings
Review scores
Source	Rating
AllMusic	2.5/5 stars
The Source	3/5 stars
Vibe	negative

Physical Funk is the second studio album by American rapper Domino. It was released on June 11, 1996, through Outburst Records. The album was produced by Domino.

The album peaked at No. 152 on the Billboard 200 and No. 34 on the Top R&B/Hip-Hop Albums chart. Two singles made it to the charts, "Physical Funk", which peaked at No. 87 on the Billboard Hot 100 and No. 11 on the Hot Rap Songs chart, while "So Fly" made it to No. 17 on the Hot Rap Songs.

== Track listing ==
No.	Title	Writer(s)	Length
1.	"Microphone Musician"	Shawn Antoine Ivy	3:31
2.	"Macadocious"	Ivy; Warren Cee	3:30
3.	"Hennessy"	Ivy	4:00
4.	"Physical Funk"	Ivy; George Clinton, Jr.; Bernard G. Worrell; William Earl Collins	3:33
5.	"Trickin"	Ivy	4:02
6.	"Long Beach Funk"	Ivy; Thomas Fredrick Browne; Thomassina Carrollyne Smith	3:39
7.	"So Fly"	Ivy	3:44
8.	"Do You Qualify"	Ivy; Kevin Gilliam; Robert Earl Bell; Ronald N. Bell; George Melvin Brown; Thomas Fletcher Dennis; Robert Spike Mickens; Claydes Eugene Smith; Alton Dameron Taylor; Richard Allen Westfield	4:36
9.	"Domino Got Beats"	Ivy; Andre Young; Darryl McDaniels; Joseph Simmons; Lorenzo Patterson; Lawrence Smith	3:59
10.	"Good Part"	Ivy	3:41
11.	"Get Your Groove On"	Ivy	3:03
12.	"Physical Funk" (Remix)	Ivy	3:52
Total length:			45:10

== Personnel ==
- Shawn "Domino" Ivy – vocals, keyboards, piano, drums, producer
- Trevor Lawrence, Jr. – drums
- Darroll Crooks – guitar, bass
- Earl Flemming – piano
- Kevin "Battlecat" Gilliam – co-producer (track 8)
- Warren Cee – organ arrangement
- Rod Michaels – recording
- Sean Freehill – mixing
- Chris Puram – re-mixing
- Ron McMaster – mastering
- Wallace "Wally T." Traugott – mastering
- Anthony "Anti" Lewis – executive producer
- Greedy Greg – executive producer

== Charts ==
Chart (1996)	Peak position
US Billboard 200	152
US Top R&B/Hip-Hop Albums (Billboard)	34
