= Sweet Potatoe Pie =

Single by Domino

from the album Domino
- B-side: "That's Real"
- Released: March 8, 1994
- Recorded: 1993
- Studio: Skip Saylor (Hollywood, CA)
- Genre: Hip hop
- Length: 3:29
- Label: Outburst Records
- Songwriters: Shawn Ivy; Kevin Gilliam
- Producer: DJ Battlecat

Domino singles chronology
"Getto Jam" (1993)	"Sweet Potatoe Pie" (1994)	"Tales from the Hood" (1995)

Music video
- "Getto Jam" on YouTube

"Sweet Potatoe Pie" is the second single by American rapper Domino. It was released on March 8, 1994 through Outburst Records. Written by Domino and DJ Battlecat, it was recorded at Skip Saylor in Hollywood and produced by Battlecat.

Released as the follow-up to his smash hit, "Getto Jam", "Sweet Potatoe Pie" also became a top 40 hit, peaking at 27 on the Billboard Hot 100, his final single to do so. The original song used a sample of Soul II Soul's 1989 single "Back to Life (However Do You Want Me)". The official remix entitled the "Sweet Vibes" remix was produced by the Gang of Four and used a sample of "Mysterious Vibes" by The Blackbyrds.

The song also appeared on Def Jam's greatest hits compilation Def Jam Music Group Inc.: 10th Year Anniversary in 1995. It was also later used in the seventh episode, "Gotta Look Up to Get Down", of the fifth season of HBO comedy-drama television series Entourage.

== Music video ==
At the 1994 Billboard Music Video Awards, the accompanying music video for "Sweet Potatoe Pie" was nominated for Clip of the Year and New Artist Clip of the Year, both in the category for Rap.

== Track listing ==
=== A-Side ===
1. "Sweet Potatoe Pie" (LP Version)
2. "Sweet Potatoe Pie" (Radio Version)

=== B-Side ===
1. "Sweet Potatoe Pie" (LP Instrumental)
2. "Sweet Potatoe Pie" (A Cappella)
3. "That's Real" (LP Version)

== Charts ==
=== Weekly charts ===
Chart (1994)	Peak position
UK Singles (Official Charts)	42
US Billboard Hot 100	27
US Dance Singles Sales (Billboard)	2
US Hot R&B/Hip-Hop Songs (Billboard)	13
US Hot Rap Songs (Billboard)	3
US Radio Songs (Billboard)	40
US Cash Box Top 100	76

=== Year-end charts ===
Chart (1994)	Position
US Hot R&B Singles (Billboard)	95
US Hot R&B Singles Sales (Billboard)	59
US Hot Rap Singles (Billboard)	26
US Hot Dance Music Maxi-Singles Sales (Billboard)	31
