= Magic City (club) =

Strip club in Atlanta, Georgia, US

Coordinates: 33°44′53.9″N 84°23′50.3″W

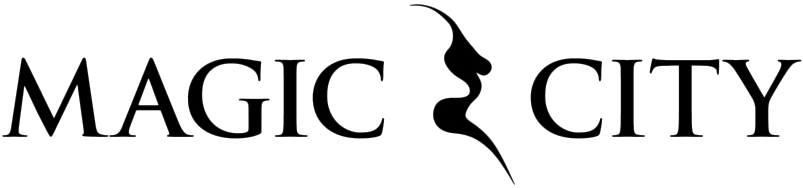

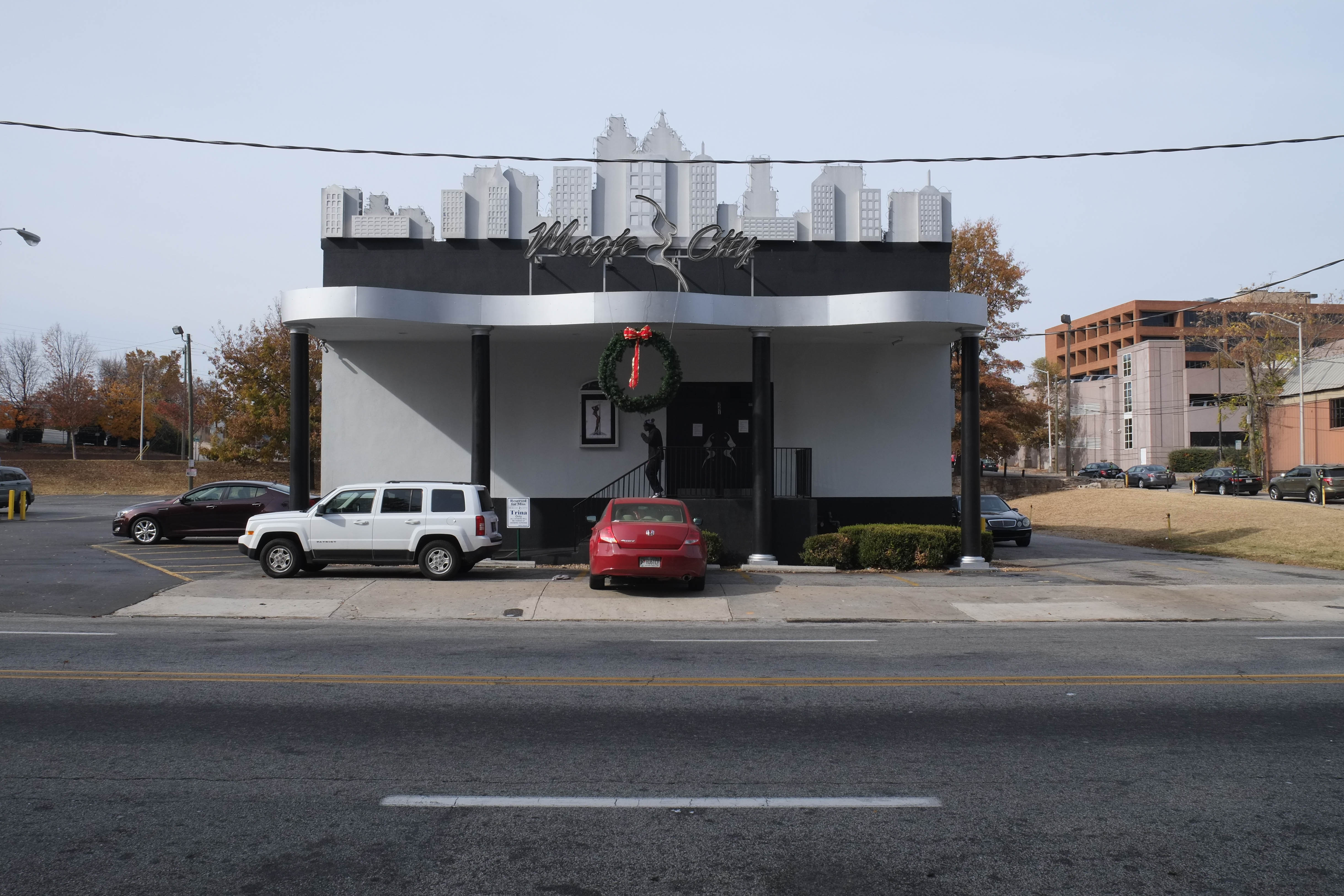
- Magic City in 2016
- Type: Strip club
- Founded: 1985 in Atlanta, Georgia, United States
- Founder: Michael "Magic" Barney
- Headquarters: Atlanta, United States
- Key people: Michael "Magic" Barney
- Owner: Michael "Magic" Barney
- Number of employees: 150 dancers and 20+ other (2010)
- Website: www.magiccity.com

Magic City is a prominent strip club in Atlanta, founded in 1985 and currently owned by Michael “Magic” Barney.

== Hip hop and rap ties ==
Described by Dan Gartland of Sports Illustrated as a "legendary strip club that should be familiar to anyone who knows anything about rap music", Magic City has well-documented ties with the trap and hip hop scene. The club has been associated with the early careers of Future and Migos. DJ Esco worked at Magic City. DC the Brain Supreme of Tag Team was working at Magic City when he released the hit "Whoomp! (There It Is)".

== In popular culture ==
Several rap and hip-hop songs mention Magic City, including "Strip Club" by The 2 Live Crew, "Magic City Monday" by Jeezy and "Magic" by Future. The reference to "Monday" is because Magic City is "supposedly the Holy Grail of Atlanta strip clubs on Monday nights." In July 2015, GQ released a documentary Magic City about the strip club, directed by Lauren Greenfield.

== Notable visitors and events ==
In addition to the artists mentioned in the § Hip hop and rap ties section, Magic City has been visited by 2Pac and Biggie, and Michael Jordan. In November 2018, Magic City was temporarily refashioned as "Future City" to celebrate Future's thirty-fifth birthday, and was visited by him, Drake, Lil Yachty, Jacquees, Pastor Troy, and others. Drake allegedly had an armored truck deliver $100,000 in cash to the strip club. In December 2018, Atlanta United FC players celebrated their MLS Cup victory at Magic City.

Magic City's food menu includes "Louwill Lemon Pepper BBQ" chicken wings, named after professional basketball player Lou Williams, who played for the Atlanta Hawks (2012–2014, 2021–2022). During the COVID-19 pandemic in 2020, Williams was on an approved absence from the NBA Bubble to attend the funeral of a family friend in Atlanta. Afterwards, he visited Magic City, where rapper Jack Harlow posted a picture on Instagram of him and Williams at the club. Williams, who said he was at the club for food, was required by the NBA to undergo a 10-day quarantine before re-entering the bubble.

In 2026, the Atlanta Hawks announced that their home game on March 16 against the Orlando Magic would "celebrate Atlanta's iconic cultural institution Magic City". The promotion was cancelled by the NBA one week before it was to have occurred.

== See also ==
- Clermont Lounge
- List of strip clubs
- Freaknik
