= Not in Kansas Anymore =

Studio album by Basehead
- Released: 1993
- Recorded: 1993
- Genres: Alternative hip hop, alternative rock
- Length: 41:39
- Label: Imago
- Producer: Michael Ivey

Basehead chronology
Play with Toys (1992)	Not in Kansas Anymore (1993)	Faith (1996)

Not in Kansas Anymore is the second album by the group Basehead, released in 1993 via Imago.

== Music and lyrics ==
The music style of Not in Kansas Anymore fuses elements of funk, hip hop, psychedelic, rock, rhythm and blues, and soul. The first half of the album is about racism; the second half deals with dating norms and rituals.

== Reception ==
Professional ratings
Review scores
Source	Rating
AllMusic	3/5 stars
Los Angeles Times	3.5/4 stars
Rolling Stone	4/5 stars
Select	2/5 medals

Rolling Stone reviewer Danyel Smith called the album "an alternative to the benign bullshit music that floods the chain stores and commercial radio waves." Stephen Thomas Erlewine wrote that "although it retains many of the same qualities of their critically acclaimed debut [...] there's nothing that has the same sense of discovery that made Play with Toys an interesting record."

Trouser Press called it "a shade less ambitious" than the debut but "nearly as good." Colson Whitehead, in The Village Voice, wrote that it possessed even more of an indie rock sound than the debut.

Spin listed it as one of the 20 best albums of 1993.

The album didn't receive much airplay or sales.

== Track listing ==
No.	Title	Writer(s)	Length
1.	"Not in Kansas"	Ivey	3:45
2.	"Introductions"	Ivey	1:00
3.	"Brown Kisses Pt. One"	Ivey	1:00
4.	"I Need a Joint"	Ivey, Lofton	3:04
5.	"Pass the Thought"	Ivey	3:48
6.	"Greener Pastures"	Ivey	2:21
7.	"Brown Kisses Pt. Too"	Ivey	2:34
8.	"Commercial Break"	Ivey	0:31
9.	"Shouldna Dunnit"	Ivey	0:47
10.	"Split Personality"	Ivey	2:24
11.	"Not the Same"	Ivey	2:31
12.	"Hoes on Tour Part One"	Ivey	1:36
13.	"The Popeye Philosophy"	Ivey	2:29
14.	"Hoes on Tour Part Two"	Ivey	1:10
15.	"Fluffy and Richard"	Ivey	3:09
16.	"Hoes on Tour Deel Drie"	Ivey	0:36
17.	"Nite Out on the Town"	Ivey	2:26
18.	"Do You Wanna Fuck (Or What)?"	Ivey	4:21
19.	"Hoes on Tour Part Four"	Ivey	0:42
Total length:			41:39

== Personnel ==
- Michael Ivey – guitar, vocals and other stuff
