= Six Feet Deep (song) =

1993 single by Geto Boys

Single by Geto Boys

from the album Till Death Do Us Part
- Released: May 28, 1993
- Studio: Jungle Style (Houston, TX); Digital Services (Houston, TX)
- Genre: Conscious hip hop; gangsta rap
- Length: 5:24
- Label: Rap-A-Lot; Priority
- Songwriters: Brad Jordan; Michael Barnett; Joseph Johnson; Lionel Richie; Marvin Gaye
- Producer: N.O. Joe

Geto Boys singles chronology
"Crooked Officer" (1993)	"Six Feet Deep" (1993)	"Straight Gangstaism" (1993)

Music video
- "Six Feet Deep" on YouTube

"Six Feet Deep" is a song by American hip hop group Geto Boys, released in May 1993 by Rap-A-Lot and Priority Records as the second single from their fourth studio album, Till Death Do Us Part (1993). Produced by N.O. Joe, it contains samples of "Easy" by Commodores and "What's Going On" by Marvin Gaye. The song peaked at numbers 40 and 42 on the US Billboard Hot 100 and Cash Box Top 100 charts.

== Composition ==
The song opens with a slowed down sample of the line "There's far too many of you dying" from "What's Going On", followed by production that incorporates a similarly slowed loop from "Easy" and drums. Lyrically, the song centers on the widespread deaths of young Black men from street violence, with each member of the Geto Boys reflecting on the victims' lives and brutal killings. Scarface raps the first and third verses, which find him recounting the funeral of one such man in full detail. The second verse is performed by Bushwick Bill, who offers a broad observation of the violence, while Big Mike performs the fourth and final verse, which serves as a farewell to the people who have died.

== Critical reception ==
Matt Jost of RapReviews wrote "While it is Scarface's stunningly emotional narrative that takes 'Six Feet Deep' to the next level, ultimately everything about the track is outstanding, making it one of the most touching moments in '90s rap." Jesse Ducker of Albumism described the song as "an effective counterpoint that demonstrates the finality of death."

== Charts ==
Chart (1993)	Peak position
US Billboard Hot 100	40
US Hot R&B/Hip-Hop Songs (Billboard)	37
US Hot Rap Songs (Billboard)	2
US Rhythmic Airplay (Billboard)	34
US Cash Box Top 100	42
