= Trends of Culture =

American hip hop trio

- M.O.L. (left), Nastee (center) and Grapevine (right).

Background information
- Also known as: Trends, Trendmen
- Origin: Manhattan, New York City, U.S.
- Genres: Hip hop; East Coast hip hop; golden age hip hop; hardcore hip hop
- Years active: 1992–1995
- Labels: Mad Sounds Recordings
- Members: Grapevine; DJ M.O.L. Nastee

Trends of Culture was an American hip hop trio from Harlem, New York City. The group consisted of Edward "Grapevine" Fordham Jr., Marcus "Nastee" Jones and Antonio "DJ M.O.L." Perry. They were signed to the Motown subsidiary Mad Sounds.

== History ==
Trends of Culture was the first group signed to Motown's subsidiary label Mad Sounds, set up in 1992 for hip hop artists. The group's manager, Darrin Chandler of Top 10 Entertainment, had been speaking to Motown executives who wanted to sign rap groups, and convinced the label to set up a specialist hip hop subsidiary label and to sign his act to the label.

Trends of Culture's first two singles "Off & On" (with a remix by Lord Finesse) and "Valley of the Skinz" were both successful on the Billboard Hot Rap Singles Chart, with "Off & On" reaching number nine in May 1993 and "Valley of the Skinz" reaching number one in October 1993. However, subsequent singles and their debut album Trendz were not successful, and the group were dropped and their second album When Trend Men Come, originally scheduled for release in March 1995, was not released by Mad Sounds. In 2019, When Trend Men Come was finally released on Gentleman's Relief Records.

Grapevine is also an actor. He appeared on television shows like Cuts and One on One. He also played Detective Aaron "Funk" Funkhauser on Battle Creek.

== Discography ==
Albums

- Trendz (1993)
- When Trend Men Come (scheduled 1995, released 2019)

Singles

- "Off & On" (1993)
- "Valley of the Skinz" (1993)
- "Who Got My Back?" (1993)
- "Make a Move" (1995)
