= Trendz (album) =

Trendz...

Studio album by Trends of Culture
- Released: April 20, 1993
- Studios: Unique (New York City, New York); Funk Hut (Manhattan, New York)
- Genre: Rap
- Label: Mad Sounds
- Producer: Trends of Culture

Trends of Culture chronology
| Trendz... (1993) | When Trend Men Come (1995) |

Trendz... is the debut studio album by American hip hop group Trends of Culture, released in April 20, 1993, by Mad Sounds Recordings. It was produced by the group, with co-production by Dinky and Swift.

== Critical reception ==
Professional ratings
Review scores
| Source | Rating |
|---|---|
| RapReviews | 7.5/10 |

The Tampa Bay Times praised the album, writing that it "blends an old school vibe with modern rhymes and cutting-edge production, jazzy yet hard core." The Los Angeles Sentinel said that "the vibe is a steady movement through the currents of rap music today that can stand up to work by Quest, Onyx, Lyte, and Mobb Deep."

== Track listing ==
1. "F@#% What Ya Heard" – 4:11
2. "Let tha Big Boyz Play" – 4:28
3. "Old Habits" – 4:46
4. "Who Got My Back?" – 3:14
5. "Hassle on the Iron Horse" – 5:00
6. "Off & On" – 4:23
7. "Crotch Ripper/Mad Speaker" – 4:06
8. "Mad Flavor Mad Style" – 3:26
9. "Valley of the Skinz" – 5:07
10. "Top Ten Interlude" – 2:44
11. "Valley of the Skinz" (Bonus Mix) – 5:40

== Singles chart positions ==
| Year | Song | Chart positions |
| Year | Song | US Rap |
|---|---|---|
| 1993 | "Off & On" | 9 |
| 1993 | "Valley of the Skinz" | 1 |
