= Whoomp! (There It Is) =

1993 single by Tag Team

Single by Tag Team

from the album Whoomp! (There It Is)
- Released: May 7, 1993
- Recorded: October 1992
- Genre: Miami bass; pop rap
- Length: 3:45
- Label: Life
- Songwriters: Stephen Gibson and Cecil Glenn (Tag Team)
- Producer: Tag Team

Tag Team singles chronology
"Whoomp! (There It Is)" (1993)	"U Go Girl" (1995)

"Whoomp! (There It Is)" is the debut single by American hip-hop/pop-rap duo Tag Team, released in May 1993, by label Life, as the first single from their debut album by same name (1993). The song was written by members Cecil "DC the Brain Supreme" Glenn and Steve "Rolln" Gibson, Final mixed was provided by Los Angeles Producer Paul"Shadow"Neal for Life Records and reached No. 1 on the US Billboard Hot R&B chart, as well as No. 2 on both the Billboard Hot 100 and the Cash Box Top 100. "Whoomp!" reached multi-platinum status and broke records for the number of consecutive weeks in the Billboard top 10. Tag Team is considered a one-hit wonder, as their subsequent singles did not find the same success. "Whoomp!" has remained a pop culture staple with multiple placements in film, television, and advertisements. The song has also endured as a mainstay at sporting and arena events. In 2024, Billboard magazine ranked "Whoomp! (There It Is)" number 14 in their "The 100 Greatest Jock Jams of All Time".

== Background ==
Tag Team recorded "Whoomp! (There It Is)" in October 1992. At that time, Glenn was working as the main DJ at Magic City, an Atlanta gentlemen's club that would later become recognized as a hub for the emerging Atlanta hip-hop and rap music scene. The song sampled a synthesizer line from the 1980 Italo disco hit "I'm Ready" by Kano. Glenn played the track at Magic City on the same day it was mixed and received a positive reaction from the audience. In the following months, people requested the song so often that it became clear to Glenn that he had a potential hit.

Tag Team shopped the single to multiple labels hoping to get a record deal but were constantly rejected because many executives were unfamiliar with southern bass and felt it was too controversial and provocative for the single to have any chance at mainstream success. In a last-ditch effort, Glenn borrowed $2,500 from his parents to press eight hundred records. The singles quickly sold out in Atlanta on word of mouth alone.

A representative from Mercury Records suggested that Tag Team should pitch their song to former Stax Records mogul Al Bell, the founder of struggling independent label Bellmark Records. Glenn reached out to Bell, who agreed to sign Tag Team without even hearing the song. Bell reportedly told Glenn, "I don’t need to hear the record. I hear it in your spirit."

== Reception ==
The song was praised by critics for its positive and uplifting tone at a time when rap music was associated with violence, crime, and political militancy. Within months of its release, "Whoomp!" reached the top position on the US Billboard Hot R&B/Hip-Hop chart. The record held the #2 spot on the Hot 100 for seven consecutive weeks and reached platinum status. In February 1994, it received its fourth platinum certification.

"Whoomp! (There It Is)" received an award in the category for "Best Rap 12-inch" at the 1994 WMC International Dance Music Awards in the US. Same year, it won an Kids' Choice Award in the category for "Favorite Song". It was rated number 97 in VH1's "100 Greatest One-Hit Wonders". The song is listed at number 58 on "Billboard's Greatest Songs of all time". "Whoomp" has been called "da bomb party song" of the 1990s by Atlanta magazine and "among the country's most commercially successful singles of all time." In February 2024, Billboard ranked it number 14 in their "The 100 Greatest Jock Jams of All Time". In 2026, the magazine ranked the song number six in their list of "The Biggest No. 2 Hot 100 Hits of All Time", noting that it had peaked at number two, just behind UB40's "Can't Help Falling in Love" and Mariah Carey's "Dreamlover".

== Chart performance ==
The hit song spent one week at #1 on the US Billboard Hot R&B chart in 1993. On the Billboard Hot 100 dated July 10, "Whoomp! (There It Is)" reached a new peak at number two, sandwiched between Janet Jackson's "That's the Way Love Goes" above and UB40's "Can't Help Falling in Love" beneath - all three songs ended up next to each other at the Year-End edition of the chart, occupying the same positions, albeit in slightly different orders. It eventually spent seven weeks at #2 in September through October 1993 on the Billboard Hot 100, but was kept out of the top slot by "Can't Help Falling in Love" and Mariah Carey's "Dreamlover". The single is certified 4× Platinum in the US for shipments of over 4,000,000 copies and, despite never reaching number one on the pop chart, the song spent 24 non-consecutive weeks in the top ten becoming the longest running top ten song of all time until Toni Braxton’s “Un-Break My Heart” spent a week longer in 1997. It was ranked the second biggest song of 1993, behind Whitney Houston's "I Will Always Love You". It has sold over 3.5 million copies in the United States.

== Controversy ==
A similar song, "Whoot, There It Is", was released by the Miami-based group 95 South a month prior to Tag Team's "Whoomp!" Both groups' record companies maintained that the similarities were a coincidence, as the phrase, "Whoomp (or whoot), there it is", was a common expression used by dancers in Atlanta and Miami nightclubs that members from both groups frequented. Arsenio Hall hosted both groups on his television show to perform their versions of the songs and let viewers vote on their favorite by calling a 900 number to donate money to the relief effort for the 1993 Midwest floods. The phrase "Whoomp! There it is!" has come to mean something similar to "Look at that!". It is intended to encourage "positive partying". Tag Team has explained that the phrase refers to "anything that one agrees with on a positive level."

Decades later, 95 South has maintained that the similarity of songs was not a coincidence, and that "Whoot, There It Is" was stolen by Tag Team.

== Music video ==
The accompanying music video for the song features a large outdoor party. It was filmed at an Atlanta fairground and shows the duo riding a carousel. Extras were recruited by word-of-mouth and also by an announcement on a local radio station. More than a thousand extras showed up for the shoot. There was a short-lived rumour that then future-President Barack Obama was among the extras in the video .

== Charts ==
=== Weekly charts ===
Chart (1993–1994)	Peak position
Australia (ARIA)	19
Austria (Ö3 Austria Top 40)	28
Europe (Eurochart Hot 100)	25
Europe (European Dance Radio)	21
Germany (GfK)	15
Netherlands (Dutch Top 40)	6
Netherlands (Single Top 100)	6
New Zealand (Recorded Music NZ)	10
Sweden (Sverigetopplistan)	27
Switzerland (Schweizer Hitparade)	40
UK Singles (Official Charts)	34
UK Dance (Official Charts)	27
UK Airplay (Music Week)	39
UK Club Chart (Music Week)	56
US Billboard Hot 100	2
US Hot R&B/Hip-Hop Songs (Billboard)	1
US Hot Rap Songs (Billboard)	4
US Rhythmic (Billboard)	5
US Cash Box Top 100	2

=== Year-end charts ===
Chart (1993)	Position
US Billboard Hot 100	2
US Hot R&B/Hip-Hop Songs (Billboard)	9
US Cash Box Top 100	2

Chart (1994)	Position
Australia (ARIA)	66
Netherlands (Dutch Top 40)	73
Netherlands (Single Top 100)	36
New Zealand (Recorded Music NZ)	49
US Billboard Hot 100	42

=== Decade-end charts ===
Chart (1990–1999)	Position
US Billboard Hot 100	15

== Certifications ==
Certifications for "Whoomp! (There It Is)"
Region	Certification	Certified units/sales
United States (RIAA)	4× Platinum	4,000,000^{^}
^{^} Shipments figures based on certification alone.

== Addams Family Values remix ==
Within a year of the release of "Whoomp! (There It Is)", Tag Team remixed the backing music with a version of the theme song from the original Addams Family television series to create the song "Addams Family (Whoomp!)" for the film Addams Family Values. Actors Christina Ricci and Jimmy Workman reprised their film roles as Wednesday Addams and Pugsley Addams (respectively) for the song's music video. This version appears as the closing track on the soundtrack album. "Addams Family (Whoomp!)" won the 1994 Razzie Award (Worst Original Song) for its writers (Ralph Sall, Stephen Gibson and Cecil Glenn).

== Popular culture ==
"Whoomp! (There It Is)" has been played or referenced in dozens of films, TV shows, and advertisements. Some of the song's most notable placements in film include Elf, D2: The Mighty Ducks, Rio, and Addams Family Values. The song is also referenced in episode titles of Martin, ER ,The Fresh Prince of Bel-Air, Regular Show, and The Secret Life of the American Teenager. It is also widely considered one of the top songs of all time for sporting events and has been included among MLB's top walk-up songs and the NBA's biggest arena anthems.

More recently, a variant of the lyric was created by Vancouver Canucks fans to laud the popularity of the (at the time) recently-hired coach Bruce Boudreau, with a "Bruce, there it is!" chant during hockey games, beginning in December 2021.

The track has been played by the Chicago Cubs to celebrate home runs.

In Indonesia, the clip of "Whoomp! There it is!" was sampled in the main loop of the dangdut song "Si Burung Bangau" by Veronica in 1997.

== Other versions ==
=== Clock version ===
"Whoomph! (There It Is)"

Single by Clock

from the album It's Time...
- Released: June 19, 1995
- Genre: Eurodance
- Length: 3:33
- Label: MCA; ZYX Music
- Songwriter: Tag Team
- Producer: Stu Allan

Clock singles chronology
"Axel F" (1995)	"Whoomph! (There It Is)" (1995)	"Oh What a Night" (1996)

Music video
- "Whoomph! (There It Is)" on YouTube

In June 1995, British pop/dance act Clock released a Eurodance cover of the song titled "Whoomph! (There It Is)". The single was released by MCA Records and ZYX Music as their fifth single from the debut album, It's Time... (1995). It was produced by Stu Allan and peaked at No. 5 in Ireland, No. 4 in the United Kingdom, No. 14 in Finland, No. 36 in Sweden, and No. 96 in Australia. It also became the act's most successful single in the UK and reached No. 11 on the Eurochart Hot 100.

==== Critical reception ====
Mark Frith from Smash Hits complimented the cover version as "fab". Another Smash Hits editor, Mark Sutherland, gave it one out of five, writing, "Another one for when you're "'avin' it large" (whatever that may mean) on the dancefloor after one too many swigs of the disco Ribena. Except that this is a boobins cover of Tag Team's load-of-rubbish-in-the-first-place number."

==== Track listing ====
- CD single, UK (1995)
1. "Whoomph! (There It Is)" (Short Stab) – 3:33
2. "Whoomph! (There It Is)" (Clock GMT mix) – 5:02
3. "Whoomph! (There It Is)" (Time Gents Please) – 5:03
4. "Whoomph! (There It Is)" (Clock 10 to 2 mix) – 5:09
5. "Whoomph! (There It Is)" (GMT dub) – 5:01
6. "Whoomph! (There It Is)" (The Visa Treatment) – 5:01

==== Charts ====
===== Weekly charts =====
Chart (1995)	Peak position
Australia (ARIA)	96
Europe (Eurochart Hot 100)	11
Finland (Suomen virallinen lista)	14
Ireland (IRMA)	5
Israel (Israeli Singles Chart)	30
Scottish Singles Sales (Official Charts)	3
Sweden (Sverigetopplistan)	36
UK Singles (Official Charts)	4
UK Dance (Official Charts)	3
UK Airplay (Music Week)	40
UK Pop Tip Club Chart (Music Week)	2

===== Year-end charts =====
Chart (1995)	Position
UK Singles (OCC)	81
UK Pop Tip Club Chart (Music Week)	28

=== The Grind Commercial ===
In November 1993, MTV produced a parody of the song as part of a commercial for their show The Grind. It features a flute melody with "Cheese!" and "Fresh produce!" replacing "Whoomph!" as shoppers dance inside a grocery store before a man is rolled in to announce that day's super special, frozen peas.

=== BM Dubs version ===
In 2001, UK garage producer BM Dubs (Andrew Kirby) released a version credited as BM Dubs presents Mr. Rumble featuring Brasstooth and Kee. It is based on Mr. Rumble's "Whoops.... We'll Be in Trouble!" from 2000, in which this version directly samples the vocals from Tag Team's "Whoomp! (There It Is)", whereas BM Dubs' 2001 version is a cover with vocals by Kee. It samples the Timo Maas remix of "Dooms Night" by Azzido Da Bass and reached No. 32 on the UK Singles Chart and No. 4 on the UK Dance Singles Chart in March 2001.

=== GEICO spot ===
In December 2020, the GEICO insurance company used a parody of "Whoomp! (There It Is)" and the members of Tag Team as the punchline to a joke in a commercial. It featured Glenn and Gibson replacing the lyrics of the song with lyrics about ice cream, turning the lyric to "Scoop! (There It Is)". While the song had been used in advertisements previously, this was the first time the members appeared in a spot.

== See also ==
- List of number-one R&B singles of 1993 (U.S.)
