= Sneeke Muthafukaz =

Studio album by Hoodratz
- Released: August 24, 1993
- Recorded: 1992–1993
- Genre: Hardcore hip hop, East Coast hip hop
- Label: Epic Street/SME Records; EK 53227 (north America); 474456 (international)
- Producer: Hoodratz, DJ Irv, David Kennedy, Carlton Batts, Bryan Leach

Sneeke Muthafukaz is the only album by the hip hop group known as Hoodratz. It was released on August 24, 1993, on Epic Street/SME Records and featured production from Hoodratz, DJ Irv, David Kennedy, Carlton Batts, and Bryan Leach. It is not the same crew that released an album during 2001 as the Hoodratz, which was a crunk group affiliated with the Ying Yang Twins. The album was moderately successful, peaking at #79 on the Top R&B/Hip-Hop Albums and #27 on the Top Heatseekers. Two singles were released from the album, "Murdered Ova Nuttin'" and "Bootlegga," the latter of which made it to #19 on the Hot Rap Singles, as well as #39 on the Hot Dance Music/Maxi-Singles Sales.

== Track listing ==
1. "Bootlegga"- 3:23
2. "Ms. Crabtree"- 1:51
3. "Rolllin' Wit da Rat Pak"- 2:47
4. "Street Smart Dummie"- 2:11
5. "Murdered over Nuttin'"- 3:11
6. "Free Cheeze"- 2:43
7. "Dag Nab It"- :24
8. "Sneeke Muthfukaz"- 3:07
9. "Had a Bad Day"- 2:09
10. "Na Na, Na Na, Na"- 3:10
11. "Grimee"- 3:22
12. "Dis Bud'z fa U"- 3:01
13. "Git off Ma Dic"- 3:46
