= Smokin' Suckaz wit Logic =

American hip hop group

- Origin: New York City, United States
- Genres: Hip hop, alternative hip hop, gangsta rap
- Years active: 1990–1994
- Label: Epic Records
- Members: Peter "Ajoe" Jorge; Darren "D-Smooth" Lolk; Curtis "Mr."Watts; Michael "Money Mike" Esterson; Spank Dog; Gary "G Suave" Garcia
- Website: Fansite

Smokin' Suckaz wit Logic was a hip-hop band from New York City active in the early 1990s.

== Biography ==
The multi-ethnic band was formed in 1990 and consisted of G "Suave" (a rapper of Puerto Rican descent who earlier had appeared on a VHS entitled Ravenswood Nights freestyling over a beatbox with another rapper called King Sek), Darren "D-Smooth" Lolk (guitar), Money Mike (bass), Curtis "Mr." Watts (drums, keyboards, background vocals), Spank Dog (programming, scratches, background vocals), and Peter "Ajoe" Jorge (programming, background vocals). They opened for Ziggy Marley and KRS-One, and released a single album, Playing' Foolz on the Epic Records label. The group's influences included alternative, funk, reggae, jazz, and metal.

Due to creative differences over their musical style, the band disbanded in 1994. Most of the members went on to pursue solo careers. Mr. Watts became a producer and a solo artist, Suave became a Christian Rapper named "Rodan Tha Thinker" in a band called True 2 Life, D-Smooth went on to play Pete Townshend in The Who Show (A The Who Tribute band) and contribute to other punk and dub influenced rock bands, Money Mike became president of an air travel company called Airtech and the President of 420tours, the official tour operator and producer of the High Times Cannabis Cup; he also owned and operated High Times Records and had a distribution arrangement with EMI Caroline. He now runs Bambu Hostel in David, Panama, a backpackers' hostel. Ajoe continued to be a producer and would later produce albums for the likes of Big Daddy Kane and Sporty Thievz.

== Discography ==
- Playin' Foolz 1993
1. Funk-A-Tac
2. Thingz Change
3. How We Hit 'Em
4. Cuz I'm Like Dat
5. B4 My Rhymez Thru
6. My Man Spank Dog
7. Playin' Foolz
8. Suckaz Tri 2 Play Me
9. Gangsta Story
10. Positive Vibez
11. He Can Save Your Soul
12. Jah Sent (CD only)
13. Herbalife
14. Uncle Tom Artist
15. Mutha Made 'Em

== singles, EPS ==
- Mutha Made 'Em/B4 My Rhymes Thru
1. Mutha Made 'Em
2. Mutha Made 'Em (Instrumental)
3. B4 My Rhymes Thru
4. B4 My Rhymes Thru (Instrumental)
- How We Hit 'Em
1. Cuz I'm Like Dat
2. B4 My Rhymez Thru
3. How We Hit 'em
4. Mutha Made 'em
5. Heat Up the M-16

== Websites ==
- Curtis Watts Website
- Fansite, includes lyrics, sample info, etc.
- Bambu Hostel Website
