= Total Devastation =

American hip hop group

- Origin: San Francisco, California, U.S.
- Genres: Hip hop
- Years active: 1988–present
- Members: Rasta Redeye; Big Tone (Soopa Dupa)
- Past members: DJ Tuf Cut Tim the Fat Beat Maker

Total Devastation is a hip hop group consisting of Rasta Redeye and Big Tone. They have sold over 60,000 copies of their debut single "Many Clouds of Smoke" in California.

== History ==
Initially consisting of Rasta Redeye (born in Puerto Rico), Da Soopa Dupa (born in Cuba), and DJ Tuf Cut Tim the Fat Beat Maker (born in Mexico), the group released their self-titled debut studio album in 1993. "Many Clouds of Smoke" was released as a single from the album. Their second studio album, The Stone Age, was released in 1998 with members of the group reduced to two – Rasta Redeye and Big Tone (formerly known as Da Soopa Dupa).

== Discography ==
=== Albums ===
Title	Details	Peak chart positions	
Title	Details	US Heat	US R&B/HH
Total Devastation	Released: May 18, 1993; Label: PGA; Digital download, CD	17	82

=== Singles ===
Title	Year	Peak chart positions			Album
Title	Year	US Rap	US R&B/HH	UK	Album
"Many Clouds Of Smoke"	1993	26	95	89	Legalize It!
