= Marxman =

Hip-hop group

- Origin: Dublin / London / Bristol
- Genres: Alternative hip hop, political hip hop, Celtic hip hop, trip hop
- Years active: 1989–1996
- Labels: Talkin' Loud, More Rockers
- Members: Oisin Lunny; Stephen Brown; MC Hollis; DJ K One

Marxman were a four-piece Marxist hip-hop group with two MCs formed in London in 1989. Their lyrics expounded communism, Irish republicanism and an end to economic and social injustice. The act combined hip-hop with traditional Irish compositions.

== History ==
The band was formed by college friends Stephen Brown (Phrase D) and (MC) Hollis Michael Byrne, who also enlisted the help of Byrne's childhood friend from Ireland, Oisin Lunny, son of Irish traditional musician Dónal Lunny. The band were completed by scratch mixer DJ K One. Together they developed an overt political message in a scene dominated by Gangsta rap, inspired by Hip-Hop, Motown soul and traditional Irish music. Their debut 1992 single "Sad Affair" which borrowed lyrics from the Irish rebel song "Irish Ways and Irish Laws" was banned by the BBC. The band's later single, "All About Eve" peaked at number 28 in the UK Singles Chart, resulting in a performance on the BBC's flagship music programme Top of the Pops. Their controversial influences stemmed more from their militant socialism than traditional nationalism.

Their initial releases were on the Talkin' Loud record label and the group built a significant fanbase prior to the release of their debut single. Their debut album came the following year, when they released 33 Revolutions per Minute in the UK, before launching themselves into the American market in 1994. However the album failed to generate significant sales in the US and Marxman left Talkin' Loud for the More Rockers label. They released their second and final album in 1996, Time Capsule, which was a strong album but with less overtly Irish traditional musical influences than their debut release before disbanding later in the same year.

Whilst the Irish Republican themes in "Sad Affair" are well publicised, Marxman lyrics also considered themes such as domestic violence with their 1993 single "All About Eve", and comparing the African slave trade and the colonisation of Ireland to modern wage slavery in "Ship Ahoy".

== Legacy ==
Although once touted as the English-Irish answer to Public Enemy, the group itself played down such comparisons. Their politics were at the fore and breaking down musical boundaries was paramount. Despite working with a number of high-profile musicians, collaborating with James McNally of the Pogues and having Sinéad O'Connor as guest vocalist on the single "Ship Ahoy," the band was very much a rap group; their track "Drifting" was produced in New York by hip-hop legend DJ Premier of Gang Starr. The band also worked with SD50, Dante Ross's production team, and Mike Mangini and Shane Faber (Brand Nubian, Digable Planets and many more) were producers on "The Cynic". Marxman also supported U2 and Depeche Mode on their respective Zoo TV and Devotional tours.

Marxman toured extensively around Europe and the US and played at many events and fundraisers for the various causes they believed in. A percentage of their single "All About Eve" was donated to Victim Support charities; they played a sold-out gig at London's The Jazz Cafe in support of that single and cause. They are considered to have been forerunners of the trip hop genre, alongside bands such as Massive Attack and Portishead, and contributed to the establishment of the "Bristol sound".

== Discography ==
Albums	Year	UK
33 Revolutions per Minute	1993	69
Time Capsule	1996	—

Singles & EPs	Year	UK
"Sad Affair/Dark Are the Days"	1992	—
"Ship Ahoy"	1992	64
"All About Eve"	1993	28
"Dark Are the Days" (12")	1993	—
"The Cynic E.P."	1994	—
"Time Capsule"	1996	—
"Backs Against the Wall" (12")	1996	—
"—" denotes releases that did not chart.

== See also ==
- Black 47
- House of Pain
- Manau
