= Van Full of Pakistans =

Studio album by Y'all So Stupid
- Released: 1993
- Recorded: 1992–93
- Studios: D.A.R.P. (Atlanta, GA); Doppler (Atlanta, GA); Bosstown (Atlanta, GA)
- Genre: Hip hop
- Length: 1:05:12
- Label: Rowdy
- Producers: Da King & I; Spearhead X; Sylvan Sargeant; the Soul Merchants

Singles from Van Full of Pakistans
- 1. "85 South" Released: October 30, 1992; 2. "Van Full of Pakistans" Released: 1993

Van Full of Pakistans is the only studio album by American hip hop group Y'all So Stupid. It was released in 1993 via Rowdy Records. The recording sessions took place at DARP Studios, Doppler Studios, and Bosstown Recording Studios, in Atlanta. The album was produced by member Spearhead X, who plays the narrating prank caller on every skit, Da King & I, Sylvan Sargeant, co-producers the Soul Merchants, with Dallas Austin serving as executive producer.

The album's title track peaked at No. 23 on the Bubbling Under R&B/Hip-Hop Songs chart. Chris Applebaum directed the music video for Little Caesar Productions.

== Background and reception ==
Professional ratings
Review scores
Source	Rating
AllMusic	3/5 stars
Robert Christgau	(neither)
Spin	(mixed)

The group was formed in 1991 when rapper H2O moved from Brooklyn to Atlanta, where he met members Unkle Buk, Sha Boogie, Spearhead X, and Logic. They were signed to Rowdy Records in late 1992. Roni Sarig, in Third Coast: Outkast, Timbaland, and How Hip-hop Became a Southern Thing, called the album "a less political, more fun-loving take on the upwardly mobile alt-rap being created by Arrested Development."

The title track was ranked No. 96 on Complex's list of "The 100 Best Hip-Hop One Hit Wonders," in 2012. LA Weekly included the album on its list of "The 5 Best Summer Rap Albums You've Probably Never Heard." Fact, in its article on the most overlooked hip hop albums of the 1990s, wrote: "This is a rap album that was widely rediscovered in the early 2000s and began changing hands for impressive sums, perhaps because it’s a perfect teleportation device to a period when the music was about having fun and experimenting."

== Track listing ==
No.	Title	Writer(s)	Producer(s)	Length
1.	"Introduce Me"	Rafael Senhouse; Robert Days; Shawne Bailey; Xavier Hargrove; Curtis Mayfield	Spearhead X	3:25
2.	"85 South"	Senhouse; Days; Bailey; Hargrove; Pentti Glan; Roy Kenner; Hugh Sullivan; Domenic Troiano; Lorenzo DeChalus; Derek Murphy; Maxwell Dixon; James P. Jackson; Trevor Smith; Bryan Higgins; Jonathan Davis; Ali Shaheed Muhammad; Malik Taylor; Sheldon Scott; Troy Anthony Hall; Ike Turner	Spearhead X	3:49
3.	"Interlude"	Senhouse; Days; Bailey; Hargrove	Spearhead X	0:10
4.	"Van Full of Pakistans"	Senhouse; Days; Bailey; Hargrove; Wayne Henderson	Spearhead X	4:51
5.	"Interlude"	Senhouse; Days; Bailey; Hargrove	Spearhead X	1:15
6.	"Bowl of Soul"	Senhouse; Days; Bailey; Hargrove; Victor Feldman; DeChalus; Murphy; Dixon	Spearhead X	3:49
7.	"Interlude"	Senhouse; Days; Bailey; Hargrove	Spearhead X	0:48
8.	"The Plant"	Senhouse; Days; Bailey; Roderick Wiggins; Guy Draper	Da King & I	4:51
9.	"Interlude"	Senhouse; Days; Bailey; Hargrove	Spearhead X	0:24
10.	"Bootleg Beatdown"	Senhouse; Days; Bailey; Wiggins; Allen Toussaint	Da King & I	5:15
11.	"Interlude"	Senhouse; Days; Bailey; Hargrove	Spearhead X	0:35
12.	"Family Tree"	Senhouse; Days; Bailey; Hargrove; Joe Sample	Spearhead X; The Soul Merchants (co.)	4:00
13.	"Dirt Road White Girl"	Senhouse; Days; Bailey; Hargrove; Herbie Hancock	Spearhead X	4:06
14.	"Interlude"	Senhouse; Days; Bailey; Hargrove	Spearhead X	0:22
15.	"Monkey Off My Back"	Senhouse; Days; Bailey; Hargrove; Jimmy Heath	Spearhead X; The Soul Merchants (co.)	3:48
16.	"Interlude"	Senhouse; Days; Bailey; Hargrove	Spearhead X	0:14
17.	"Super Nigga"	Senhouse; Days; Bailey; Hargrove; Jimmy McGriff	Spearhead X	4:05
18.	"Y'all"	Senhouse; Days; Bailey; Hargrove	Spearhead X	5:02
19.	"On & On"	Senhouse; Days; Bailey; Sylvan Sargeant; Dimitri Tiomkin; Ned Washington; Herb Rooney	Sylvan Sargeant	4:41
20.	"Interlude"	Senhouse; Days; Bailey; Hargrove	Spearhead X	1:41
21.	"You Wouldn't Understand"	Senhouse; Days; Bailey; Hargrove	Spearhead X	3:35
22.	"85 South (Remix)"	Senhouse; Days; Bailey; Hargrove	Spearhead X	4:26
Total length:				1:05:12

Sample credits

- Track 1 contains samples from "Hard Times" written by Curtis Mayfield and "Swahili" performed by Clark Terry.
- Track 2 contains samples from "I Can Hear You Calling" written by Pentti Glan, Roy Kenner, Hugh Sullivan & Domenic Troiano, "All For One" written by Lorenzo DeChalus, Derek Murphy & Maxwell Dixon, "Scenario" written by James P. Jackson, Trevor Smith, Bryan Higgins, Jonathan Davis, Ali Shaheed Muhammad, Malik Taylor, Sheldon Scott & Troy Anthony Hall, and "Scratch" written by Ike Turner.
- Track 4 contains samples from "Mosadi" written by Wayne Henderson and performed by the Crusaders.
- Track 6 contains samples from "Azule Serape" written by Victor Feldman and "Punks Jump Up to Get Beat Down" written by Brand Nubian.
- Track 8 contains samples from "Tables Turned" written by Guy Draper and performed by the Unifics.
- Track 10 contains samples from "Fairchild" written by Allen Toussaint and performed by Willie West.
- Track 12 contains samples from "The Thing" written by Joe Sample.
- Track 13 contains samples from "Textures" written by Herbie Hancock.
- Track 15 contains samples from "Far Away Lands" written by Jimmy Heath.
- Track 17 contains samples from "Jumping the Blues" written by Jimmy McGriff.
- Track 19 contains samples from "High Noon" written by Dimitri Tiomkin & Ned Washington and "Synthetic Substitution" written by Herb Rooney.

== Personnel ==
- Shawne "H2o" Bailey – vocals, sleeve notes
- Logic – vocals, sleeve notes
- Unkle Buk – vocals, sleeve notes
- Sha Boogie – vocals
- Xavier "Spearhead X" Hargrove – producer, mixing
- Roderick "DJ Majesty" Wiggins – producer, mixing
- Sylvan Sargeant – producer
- The Soul Merchants – co-producer
- Tomi Martin – guitar (track 4)
- Amy Lee Schwartzberg – saxophone (track 12)
- Debra Killings – bass (tracks: 13, 19, 21)
- Darin Prindle – recording, mixing
- Thom Kidd – recording
- Ted Sabety – mixing
- Brett Richardson – engineering assistant
- Jason Shablik – engineering assistant
- Paul Rankin – engineering assistant
- Phil Tan – engineering assistant
- Tom Coyne – mastering
- Dallas Austin – executive producer
- Kim Lumpkin – coordinator
- Claude Austin – A&R direction
- Glen E. Friedman – art direction, photography
