= 33 Revolutions per Minute (album) =

Studio album by Marxman
- Released: 1 April 1993 (UK), 1994 (USA)
- Recorded: 1992
- Genre: Hip hop
- Length: 56:52 (UK), 60:27 (USA)
- Label: Talkin' Loud
- Producers: Various, DJ Premier

Marxman chronology
33 Revolutions per Minute (1993)	Time Capsule (1996)

Professional ratings
Review scores
Source	Rating
AllMusic	4/5 stars

33 Revolutions per Minute is Marxman's debut album, released in the United Kingdom on 1 April 1993, with a slightly modified version being released in the United States the following year. Three singles were released in the UK from the album – the double A side "Dark are the Days" and "Sad Affair", the latter of which was banned by the BBC due to its Irish Republican lyrics, "Ship Ahoy" and finally "All About Eve", which was the group's greatest commercial success reaching number 28 in the UK Singles Chart.

== Track listing (UK) ==
The album featured a number of different producers, and also contributions by established artists such as Sinéad O'Connor. All tracks were scratched by DJ K One except track 9, scratched by DJ Premier.

No.	Title	Length
1.	"Theme from Marxman"	3:48
2.	"All About Eve"	3:16
3.	"Father Like Son"	4:25
4.	"Ship Ahoy"	7:25
5.	"Do You Crave Mystique"	4:29
6.	"Sad Affair"	3:52
7.	"Droppin' Elocution"	4:04
8.	"Dark Are The Days"	5:10
9.	"Drifting"	4:30
10.	"Demented"	4:54
11.	"Spot On My Nose"	4:28
12.	"Sad Affair" (Bodhrán remix)	3:38
13.	"All About Eve (Full Mix Edit)" (US release track)	4:06

== Credits ==
Tracks 2, 3, 4, 5 and 10 were produced by Adam Fuest, tracks 1, 8 and 11 by Demus, tracks 6, 8 and 12 by Leroy Quintyn, track 9 by Gang Starr and track 7 by Stimulated Dummies.
