= Clan Destined =

American hip hop group

Background information
- Origin: Atlanta, Georgia, U.S.
- Genres: Hip hop
- Years active: 2002–present
- Labels: VJC Recordings, Domination Recordings
- Members: DT; AmDex
- Website: http://www.clan-d.net

Clan Destined is an American hip hop group from Atlanta, Georgia that formed in 2002. The group is composed of Dustin Teague and Yamin Semali, better known by their stage names DT and AmDex, respectively. Both members are rappers, producers, DJs, and multi-instrumentalists.

== History ==
DT and AmDex are both originally from North Carolina, but they met at Morehouse College in Atlanta in 2002. Prior to their meeting, AmDex was already a member of an extensive music collective of emcees and producers formerly called Vinyl Junkies Clique (or, The VJC). The collective has spawned notable alum and spinoffs in the indie and progressive hip-hop circuits, including P.U.D.G.E., Sum, The Milky Way, The Difference Machine, DJ 2-Tone Jones (Shaolin Jazz), Mario "X-Man" Prins and Jesse "Xro" Pinkney, founder of SoulPublicRadio.com. DT was inducted shortly thereafter. The VJC went on to create the record label VJC Recordings through which they released Strange Arrangement, the only full-length release featuring all members of the collective.

In 2007, the group released its well-received debut album Abbracadamn!!! on Domination Recordings. Later that year, the independent rap label Rawkus named Clan Destined as one of the 50 indie rap prospects in the country. The group released And for Our Next Trick...The Remix EP, a collection of remixes from Abbracadamn!!! in addition to new recordings, to be featured on the Rawkus 50 Project in 2007.

In 2010, Clan Destined released the album A Story Never Told: F#$% a Mixtape and was voted "Best Atlanta-Based Hip Hop Group" by WRFG's The Beatz and Lyrics Show.

The group released its most recent album Self Titled on January 22, 2011. It was given a rating of 5 out of 5 stars in Creative Loafing the following week.

Clan Destined's live performance style is characterized by witty rhymes, skillful turntablism, and improvised production involving the use of MPCs, keyboards, and drums. The group has shared stages with RJD2, Del tha Funkee Homosapien, Devin the Dude, Sound Tribe Sector Nine, People Under The Stairs, KRS-One, Count Bass D, GZA, Sadat X and various other artists.

== Discography ==
=== Studio albums ===
Year	Title
2007	Abbracadamn!!!: First studio album; Label: Domination Recordings
2007	And for Our Next Trick...The Remix EP: Second studio album; Label: Rawkus
2010	A Story Never Told: F#$% a Mixtape: First mixtape; Label: Self-released
2011	Self Titled: Third studio album; Label: Self-released
