= Total Devastation (album) =

1993 album by Total Devastation

Studio album by Total Devastation
- Released: May 18, 1993
- Recorded: 1992–1993
- Studio: Cherokee Recording Studios (Hollywood, CA); The Enterprise Studios (Burbank, CA); Paramount Recording Studios (Hollywood, CA)
- Genre: West Coast Hip hop, alternative hip hop
- Length: 56:38
- Label: PGA Records
- Producer: Patrick Armstrong (exec.); Total Devastation

Total Devastation chronology
Total Devastation (1993)	The Stone Age (1998)

Singles from Total Devastation
- 1. "Many Clouds of Smoke" Released: September 20, 1993; 2. "Hemp Rally" Released: April 25, 1994; 3. "Wonderful World of Skins" Released: August 8, 1994

Professional ratings
Review scores
Source	Rating
AllMusic	2/5 stars

Total Devastation is the debut studio album by American hip hop group Total Devastation. It was released on May 18, 1993 through PGA Records.

== Track listing ==
1. Legalize Today! - 1:06
2. Hemp Rally - 4:04
3. Many Clouds of Smoke - 5:28
4. Da Soopa Doopa - 4:04
5. Fat Blunt Caper (featuring Da Rhymeskeme) - 5:21
6. Da Horny Man - 2:22
7. Wonderful World Of Skins - 3:30
8. Come Again - 3:00
9. Cloud Nine - 3:51
10. The D.G.F. Style (featuring Flymar & Whoop "D" Wham) - 5:35
11. You'll Get Blasted - 3:20
12. Zooted (featuring Nappy) - 5:44
13. Hemp Hemp Hooray (Relegalize Today) (featuring Michael M. of H.E.M.P.) - 3:45
14. Many Clouds of Smoke (Remix) - 5:28

== Charts ==
Chart (1993–94)	Peak position
US Top R&B/Hip-Hop Albums (Billboard)	82
US Heatseekers Albums (Billboard)	17
