= Domino (rapper) =

American rapper

- Also known as: Genuine Draft
- Born: Shawn Antoine Ivy; March 17, 1972 (age 54); St. Louis, Missouri, U.S.
- Origin: Long Beach, California
- Genre: Hip hop
- Occupations: Rapper; producer; singer
- Years active: 1992–present
- Labels: Outburst Records, Def Jam, Columbia Records, MCA Records, Thump Records

Shawn Antoine Ivy, known as Domino, (born March 17, 1972 in St. Louis, Missouri), is an American rapper. He resides in Long Beach, California. Being a Crip himself, he auditioned for the Bloods & Crips project in the early 1990s. He is the first rapper, in order of appearance, in the title track Bangin' on Wax on the album of the same name. His debut album, Domino, spawned two major hits in the United States, including the Top 10 hit "Getto Jam", which reached No. 7 on the Billboard Hot 100. In the January 15, 1994, issue of Billboard, Domino's single "Getto Jam" simultaneously held the number-one position on three charts: Hot Rap Singles, Hot Dance Music/Maxi-Singles Sales, and Hot R&B Singles Sales. Several further albums were released, and Domino continued to score hits on the R&B charts into the 2000s (decade).

In 1996, Domino appeared on the Red Hot Organization's compilation CD, America is Dying Slowly, alongside Biz Markie, Wu-Tang Clan, and Fat Joe, among many other prominent hip hop artists. The CD, meant to raise awareness of the AIDS epidemic among African American men, was heralded as "a masterpiece" by the Source magazine. He also performed on many soundtracks, including The Show, The Mask, Clueless, Blankman, Tales From the Hood and Spooky House.

While his self-titled debut album was critically and commercially well-received, many were quick to point out that his style was similar to that of fellow Long Beach resident and up-and-coming Dr. Dre protégé, Snoop Doggy Dogg. Three years later, Domino released his second album, Physical Funk, which failed to become as successful as its predecessor. He is a born-again Christian.

== Discography ==
=== Albums ===
Year	Album	Peak chart positions		Certifications
Year	Album	U.S.	U.S. R&B	Certifications
1993	Domino: Released: December 7, 1993; Label: Outburst / Def Jam	39	10	US: Gold
1996	Physical Funk: Released: June 11, 1996; Label: Outburst / Def Jam	152	34	
1997	Dominology: Released: September 2, 1997; Label: Domino Entertainment/Thug Records	—	—	
1997	The World of Dominology: Released: November 4, 1997; Label: Caw Records/Cyber Records/Domino/DCC Compact Classics	—	—	
1999	Remember Me: Released: February 9, 1999; Label: K-Town Records	—	—	
2001	D-Freaked It: Released: June 19, 2001; Label: Slipdisc	–	95	
2001	Getto: Released: August 28, 2001; Label: Pioneer	–	–	
2004	Domination: Released: October 26, 2004; Label: Thump Records	–	–	
2014	Get It Right: Released: January 21, 2014; Label: Premium Sol Entertainment	–	–	

=== Singles ===
Year	Single	Chart positions			Album
Year	Single	U.S. Hot 100	U.S. R&B	U.S. Rap	Album
1993	"Getto Jam"	7	4	1	Domino
1994	"Sweet Potatoe Pie"	27	13	3	Domino
1994	"Money is Everything"	-	-	-	Domino
1994	"Long Beach Thang"	-	-	11	Domino
1995	"Tales from the Hood"	103	51	8	Tales from the Hood
1996	"Physical Funk"	87	46	11	Physical Funk
1996	"So Fly"	112	64	17	Physical Funk
2001	"Like That"	–	88	8	D-Freaked It
