= Tag Team (duo) =

American hip-hop band

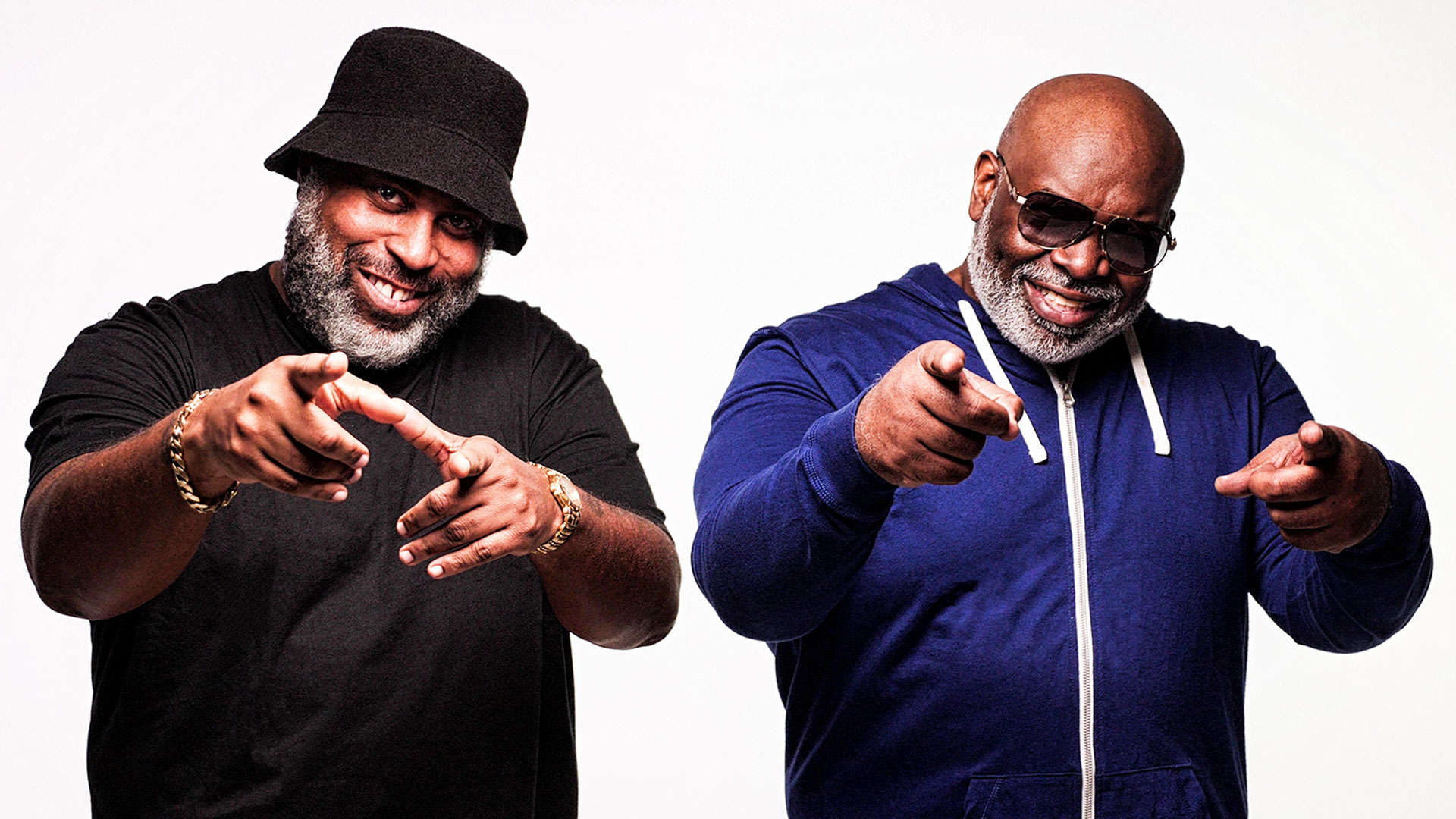
- Tag Team in 2021

Background information
- Origin: Atlanta, Georgia, U.S.
- Genres: Hip-hop; pop rap; freestyle; R&B; bass music; Southern hip-hop
- Years active: 1990–present
- Labels: Bellmark; Life; Walt Disney
- Members: DC The Brain Supreme; Steve Rolln
- Website: tagteambackagain.com

Tag Team is an American hip-hop/pop-rap duo residing in Atlanta, Georgia. They are known almost solely for their 1993 single "Whoomp! (There It Is)", which appeared in numerous advertisements, films, and television series. The duo is made up of Cecil Glenn (DC, the Brain Supreme) and Steve Gibson (Steve Rolln).

In the early 1990s, Tag Team broke stereotypes about the hip-hop genre by demonstrating that there is more to hip-hop than inflammatory lyrics. The success of "Whoomp! (There It Is)" represented a milestone in the history of hip-hop because it has been enjoyed by culturally and generationally diverse audiences.

== History and legacy ==
=== Formation ===
DC Glenn and Steve Gibson grew up in Denver, Colorado. They met at Manual High School in 1982, where both pursued their musical interests. Gibson played drums in the jazz band and attended audio engineering classes at an early college education program, while Glenn sang as a tenor in Manual High School's Bolt Vibrations Chorus.

They began to develop as hip-hop artists in their youth, but the musical style of Tag Team originated after they moved to Georgia and were exposed to the southern bass genre. In 1988, Gibson enrolled at the Art Institute of Atlanta to study studio engineering. Glenn followed shortly after; he had been attending Sacramento State University. It was in the South that the two were inspired by artists such as Success N Effect and Kilo Ali as they explored the roots of the Southern hip-hop genre. In 1990, Gibson and Glenn released their first 12-inch single, "Strictly Political", as The Tag Team Crew.

=== "Whoomp! (There It Is)" ===
In August 1992, Tag Team recorded "Whoomp! (There It Is)". At that time, Glenn was working as the main DJ at a gentleman's club in Atlanta called Magic City, which would later become recognized as a hub of Atlanta hip-hop and rap music. Glenn played the track in the club on the same day it was mixed. "Whoomp!" received the biggest crowd response he had ever seen as a DJ. The single was shopped to and rejected by multiple record labels because executives were unfamiliar with southern bass and were unsure if the sound would sell well around the country. Glenn instead borrowed $2,500 from his parents to press 800 records. The singles quickly sold out in Atlanta on word of mouth alone.

A representative from Mercury Records ultimately pointed them in the right direction, suggesting that the best person to promote music from the southern bass genre was Stax Records mogul Al Bell. Glenn reached out to Bell, who agreed to sign Tag Team.

Within months, "Whoomp!" reached the top position on the Billboard Hot R&B/Hip-Hop chart and the Hot 100 Single Sales chart. The record held the #2 spot on the Billboard Hot 100 for seven weeks straight and reached platinum status, signifying the sale of at least a million copies. In February 1994, it received its fourth platinum certification. The song came to be used at sports events and in motion picture productions, such as Elf, Shark Tale, Beverly Hills Chihuahua, and D2: The Mighty Ducks.

A similar song, "Whoot, There It Is", was released by the Miami-based group 95 South a month prior to Tag Team's "Whoomp!" Both groups' record companies maintained that the similarities were a coincidence, as the phrase "Whoomp (or whoot), there it is" was a common expression used by dancers in Atlanta and Miami nightclubs where members from both groups spent a lot of time. Arsenio Hall hosted both groups on his show to perform their versions of the songs and let viewers vote on their favorite by calling a 900 number to donate money to the relief effort for the 1993 Midwest Floods.

Lyrically and musically, critics and listeners have pointed out the song's positive and uplifting vibe. The phrase "Whoomp! There it is!" has come to mean something similar to "Look at that!" It is intended to encourage "positive partying." In interviews, Glenn and Gibson discussed the conversation in which they decided to use the phrase. Glenn said, "Oh, man, we need to do a song called, 'Whoomp, there it is". Gibson was on board immediately, replying simply, "How do you spell it?" Tag Team has explained that the phrase is about "anything that one agrees with on a positive level."

"Whoomp! (There It Is)" also has a unique beat and bassline that fans sometimes refer to as "whoomping". "Whoomp" has been called "Da Bomb Party Song" of the 90s by Atlanta Magazine and "among the country's most commercially successful singles of all time".

=== Hiatus ===
Tag Team's album, Whoomp! (There It Is), which spawned the eponymous single, was certified gold, and two more singles were released from it. However, neither could recapture the popularity of the four-time platinum "Whoomp!" single. Tag Team's 1995 follow-up album, Audio Entertainment, sold poorly, in part as a consequence of their label's looming legal and financial troubles.

In 1997, Tag Team's record label, Bellmark Records, filed for bankruptcy after paying out a settlement in a lawsuit claiming that Tag Team had sampled Kano's "I'm Ready" without permission. When Bellmark's assets were split up, the ownership rights to "Whoomp!" were in question. After 24 years, a long and contentious dispute regarding the song's ownership rights and related copyright infringement damages was finally settled in bankruptcy court. Tag Team retained 100 percent of the writers' share and received a portion of the publisher's income derived from the exploitation and any future sale of the rights to "Whoomp!" They were also granted the right to recover performance royalties from third parties.

Amid these circumstances, Glenn returned to DJing at Atlanta clubs. Though they never formally ended their partnership and intended to take only a brief hiatus in the mid-90s, Glenn and Gibson stopped recording and performing as Tag Team for nearly a decade. "Whoomp! (There It Is)" and, by extension, Tag Team itself, began to see a resurgence in 2003 when the song appeared in Elf. Over the next couple of years, it turned up in other movies and TV shows as well. Glenn and Gibson were invited to several corporate events to perform their hit as it experienced its renaissance, but neither had plans to revive Tag Team.

Tag Team performed at the San Francisco 49ers' Halftime Show and the 2019 Hammer House Party Tour. Most recently, they performed at the halftime show of the Seahawks' season opener game against the Denver Broncos, in Seattle, WA in September 2024.

=== Impact ===
Tag Team's role in the popularization of Atlanta's version of Miami bass, Southern bass, contributed to the rise of Atlanta as a home for unique alternatives to the established "East Coast/West Coast" hip-hop identities, including DJ MZH (aka Marcus Holbert). Around the end of 2020, Tag Team appeared in a GEICO commercial parodying "Whoomp!" with an ice cream scenario and the substituted lyric "Scoop!".

== Discography ==
=== Studio albums ===
| Title | Details | Peak chart positions | | Certifications (sales threshold) |
| Title | Details | US | US R&B | Certifications (sales threshold) |
|---|---|---|---|---|
| Whoomp! (There It Is) | Release date: July 20, 1993; Label: Bellmark/Life; Formats: CD, cassette | 39 | 28 | RIAA: Gold |
| Audio Entertainment | Release date: August 4, 1995; Label: Bellmark/Life; Formats: CD, cassette | — | — | |
| Boxcar Graffiti | Release date: December 1, 2010; Label: inthegroovemusic; Format: Digital download, streaming | — | — | |
| Turnt Up Season | Release date: January 30, 2015; Label: Kornerstone Music/Hit Music Empire; Formats: Digital download, streaming | — | — | |
"—" denotes releases that did not chart

=== Compilation albums ===
| Title | Details |
|---|---|
| The Best of Tag Team | Release date: February 1, 2000; Label: Bellmark; Formats: CD, cassette |

=== Singles ===
| Year | Single | Peak chart positions | | | | | Certifications (sales threshold) | Album |
| Year | Single | US | US R&B | US Pop | AUS | UK | Certifications (sales threshold) | Album |
|---|---|---|---|---|---|---|---|---|
| 1993 | "Whoomp! (There It Is)" | 2 | 1 | 38 | 19 | 34 | RIAA: 4× Platinum; ARIA: Gold | Whoomp (There It Is) |
| 1993 | "U Go Girl" | — | — | — | 85 | — | | Whoomp (There It Is) |
| 1994 | "Here It Is, Bam!" | — | 75 | — | — | — | | Non-album singles |
| 1995 | "Funkey Situation" | — | — | — | — | — | | Non-album singles |
"—" denotes releases that did not chart

=== Other charted songs ===
| Year | Single | Peak chart positions | | Album |
| Year | Single | US | UK | Album |
|---|---|---|---|---|
| 1994 | "Addams Family (Whoomp!)" | 84 | 53 | Addams Family Values: Music from the Motion Picture |
| 1994 | "Whoomp! (There It Is)" (remix) | — | 48 | Non-album single |
| 1994 | "Whoomp! (There It Went)" (with Mickey, Minnie, and Goofy) | 97 | — | Mickey Unrapped |
"—" denotes releases that did not chart

=== Music videos ===
| Year | Video | Director |
|---|---|---|
| 1993 | "Whoomp! (There It Is)" | V.J. Beedles |
| 1993 | "Addams Family Whoomp" | V.J. Beetles |
| 1994 | "Whoomp! (There It Went)" (with Mickey, Minnie, Goofy and Donald) | |
| 1995 | "Pig Power in the House" | |

== Awards and nominations ==
- Favorite Song, 1994 Kids' Choice Awards – won
- Favorite Pop/Rock Song, American Music Awards of 1994 – nominated
- Best R&B New Artist, 1994 Soul Train Music Awards – nominated
