= Whoomp! (There It Is) (album) =

Studio album by Tag Team
- Released: July 8, 1993
- Recorded: 1992–93
- Studios: McMix Production Services (Atlanta, GA)
- Genre: Pop rap
- Labels: Bellmark; Life
- Producer: Tag Team

Tag Team chronology
Whoomp! (There It Is) (1993)	Audio Entertainment (1995)

Alternative cover

Singles from Whoomp! (There It Is)
- 1. "Whoomp! (There It Is)" Released: April 14, 1993; 2. "U Go Girl" Released: April 28, 1994

Whoomp! (There It Is) is the debut studio album by American rap duo Tag Team. It was released on July 8, 1993, via Bellmark/Life Records. The recording sessions took place at McMix Production Services, in Atlanta. The album was produced by members Steve Roll'n and DC the Brain Supreme.

Whoomp! (There It Is) album peaked at number 39 on the Billboard 200 and number 28 on the Top R&B Albums chart in the United States. On January 27, 1994, it was certified Gold by the Recording Industry Association of America. Its lead single, "Whoomp! (There It Is)", made it to No. 2 on the Billboard Hot 100 and No. 4 on the Hot Rap Singles chart; and, by February 24, 1994, reached 4× Platinum certification by the RIAA.

== Critical reception ==
Professional ratings
Review scores
Source	Rating
AllMusic	3/5 stars

In his retrospective review for AllMusic, Stephen Thomas Erlewine wrote that "although "Whoomp! (There It Is)" is a wonderfully mindless single, it can't carry an entire album alone. Nothing else on Tag Team's debut album comes close to matching the delirious chanting and rolling beats of the single, making Whoomp! (There It Is) a pretty tedious affair".

== Track listing ==
All tracks are written by Cecil Glenn and Steve Gibson, except tracks 3, 9 and 11 co-written with N' Nambi Paskins.

No.	Title	Length
1.	"Whoomp! (There It Is)"
2.	"U Go Girl"
3.	"Free Style"
4.	"Just Call Me DC"
5.	"It's Somethin'"
6.	"Get Nasty"
7.	"Bring It On"
8.	"Funk Key"
9.	"Gettin' Phat"
10.	"Bobyahead"
11.	"Wreck da Set"
12.	"Drop Dem"
13.	"Kick da Flow"

== Personnel ==
- Cecil "DC the Brain Supreme" Glenn – songwriter, vocals, scratches (tracks: 4, 5), programming
- Stephen "Steve Roll'n" Gibson – songwriter, vocals, programming
- N' Nambi Paskins – songwriter (tracks: 3, 9, 11), backing vocals
- Cream (Of Wheat) – backing vocals
- Felony – backing vocals
- Kyra and Odyssey 6 – backing vocals
- Lamont Isom – backing vocals
- Lisa Hickembottom – backing vocals
- Marion Broussard – backing vocals
- Nika Mitchell – backing vocals
- Platinum (PG13) – backing vocals
- Stephanie Stokes – backing vocals
- Tiger Tiger Tiger – backing vocals
- Tracey Gibson – backing vocals
- Tyler Gibson – backing vocals
- Jim O'Neill – guitar (track 5)
- Juan José Blanco Hurtado – scratches (tracks: 7, 9)
- Don McKinzie – recording, editing, sequencing
- Andy Metcalf – recording
- Harry O'Brien – recording
- Stu Gordon – editing (track 1)
- Guy Costa – mastering
- Dennis Loren – art direction, design
- Dan Decker – photography

== Charts ==
Chart (1993)	Peak position
US Billboard 200	39

== Certifications ==
Region	Certification	Certified units/sales
United States (RIAA)	Gold	500,000^{^}
^{^} Shipments figures based on certification alone.
