= Live instrumentation =

In music, live instrumentation is the use of acoustic and electronic musical instruments in live music and recording rather than DJing, sampling, and other recording techniques.
