= Y'all So Stupid =

American alternative hip hop group from Georgia

Yall So Stupid
- Origin: Atlanta, Georgia, U.S.
- Genres: Hip hop; alternative hip hop; Southern hip hop
- Years active: 1991–1993
- Labels: Rowdy Records, Arista Records
- Past members: H2O; Logic; Unkle Buk; Sha Boogie

Y'all So Stupid was an American alternative hip hop group based in Atlanta, Georgia, United States. It was formed by H2O, Unkle Buk, Sha Boogie, Spearhead X and Logic (Note: not to be confused with the rapper from Maryland.) in 1991. After performing extensively in Atlanta's underground circuit, the group was signed by Dallas Austin & L.A. Reid to Rowdy Records in 1992. Their debut album, Van Full of Pakistans, was released on May 25, 1993, The group disbanded shortly after.

In 1995, H2O formed the group Massinfluence with Audessey, Cognito and Spearhead X.

== Discography ==
Albums
Title	Release Info
Van Full Of Pakistans	Released: May 25, 1993; Label: Rowdy Records; Formats: CD, LP, Cassette
