= Louie Teran =

American mastering engineer

Louie Teran is an American mastering engineer and educator. He has worked on recordings for over 200 independent and major record labels artists and soundtracks, most notably, Danny Elfman, Hanz Zimmer and Thirty Seconds to Mars. He is currently one of the mastering engineers at Marcussen Mastering, owned by Chief Mastering Engineer Stephen Marcussen, in Hollywood, California.

== Discography ==
Year	Album	Artist	Role
2015	Afrodeezia	Marcus Miller	Mastering
2014	Terral	Pablo Alborán	Mastering
2014	The Art of McCartney		Mastering
2014	The Lego Movie [Original Motion Picture Soundtrack]	Mark Mothersbaugh	Mastering
2013	After Earth [Original Motion Picture Soundtrack]	James Newton Howard	Mastering
2013	Raanjhanaa /Ambikapathy	A. R. Rahman	Mastering
2013	Burning Lights	Chris Tomlin	Mastering
2013	Injustice: Gods Among Us		Mastering
2011	A.N.T. Farm		Mastering
2011	Control	Abandon	Mastering
2011	Disney Jazz, Vol. 1: Everybody Wants to Be a Cat		Mastering
2011	Four-Letter Words	Simon Spire	Mastering
2011	Glee: the Music: The Complete Season 1 CD Collection	Glee	Mastering
2011	Green Lantern [Original Score]	James Newton Howard	Mastering
2011	Tear the Fences Down	Eulogies	Mastering
2010	Connect the Dots	Stacy Clark	Mastering
2010	Glee: The Music, Best of Season One	Glee	Mastering
2010	Recollection	k.d. lang	Assistant Engineer
2010	The Disney Reggae Club		Mastering
2010	What Lies Beneath	Tarja	Mastering Engineer
2010	Wilderness Heart	Black Mountain	Digital Editing
2009	2012 [Original Score]	Harald Kloser / Thomas Wander	Mastering
2009	Baby Darling Doll Face Honey	Band of Skulls	Remastering, Mastering
2009	Glee: The Music, Vol. 1	Glee	Mastering
2009	Glee: The Music, Vol. 2	Glee	Mastering
2009	God of the Ages: Live at Thomas Road	Charles Billingsley	Mastering
2009	In the Late Bright	Tommy Keene	Mastering
2009	Monsters vs. Aliens [Music from the Motion Picture]	Henry Jackman	Mastering
2009	Music Inspired by Fahrenheit 9/11 [Soundtrack]		Mastering
2009	Never Say Goodbye	Sarah Bettens	Mastering
2009	Person to Person	Foreign Born	Mastering
2009	Transformers: Revenge of the Fallen [The Score]	Steve Jablonsky	Mastering
2009	Visitation	Division Day	Mastering
2009	Zounds	Dappled Cities	Mastering
2008	American Teen		Mastering
2008	Boo!	Was (Not Was)	Mastering
2008	Country Sings Disney		Mastering
2008	Batman : The Dark Knight	Hans Zimmer	Mastering
2008	Disney Music Block Party		Mastering
2008	Failure Looks So Good	The Wanteds	Mastering
2008	For Your Consideration	Kathy Griffin	Mastering
2008	Imaginary Biographies	Leerone	Mastering
2008	Last Days at the Lodge	Amos Lee	Mastering
2008	Madagascar: Escape 2 Africa [Original Soundtrack]		Mastering
2008	Painted Birds In The Orange Mirror Sun	The Western States Motel	Mastering
2008	Time Is Fiction	Edison Glass	Mastering
2008	Unscripted	Jo De La Rosa	Mastering
2008	A Date with Daylight	The Stranger's Six	Mastering
2007	Catch and Release [Original Soundtrack]		Mastering
2007	Cruel Melody	Black Light Burns	Mastering
2007	I Heard a Voice: Live from Long Beach Arena	AFI	Mastering
2007	Last Wild Place: Anthology	Lacy J. Dalton	Mastering
2007	Lost in Aurora	The Appearance	Mastering
2007	Modern Blues	Lapush	Mastering
2007	My Winter Storm	Tarja / Tarja Turunen	Mastering
2007	Nathalie Matthews	Nathalie Matthews	Mastering
2007	Nyee Moses	Nyee Moses	Mastering
2007	Pirates of the Caribbean [Box Set] [Collector's Edition] [4 CD/1 DVD]	Hans Zimmer	Mastering
2007	Reaching Out	Larisa Stow	Mastering
2007	See the Light	Bo Bice	Mastering
2007	Self Evident	Daniel Now	Mastering
2007	Shine	Sarah Bettens	Mastering
2007	Sunset Junction	Movie Star Kiss	Mastering
2007	Surf's Up		Mastering
2007	Teenage Mutant Ninja Turtles [2007 Soundtrack]		Mastering
2007	Ten Years	Cory Morrow	Mastering
2007	The Other Side	Stereo Fallout	Mastering
2007	The Wildbirds	The Wildbirds	Mastering
2007	Transformers: The Score [Original Motion Picture Score]	Steve Jablonsky	Mastering
2007	Tribe	Luka Bloom	Mastering
2007	Waiting for Decay	Waiting for Decay	Mastering
2007	Welcome to Our Frequency	Parking Lot Pimp	Mastering
2007	[hey.]	SingleTrackMind	Mastering
2007	All is Well: Songs for Christmas [WalMart Exclusive]	Clay Aiken	Mastering
2007	Aquamarine: Music From The Motion Picture		Mastering
2006	Autumn Days	Gus Black	Mastering
2006	Crashing the Ether	Tommy Keene	Mastering
2006	Freedomland [Original Motion Picture Soundtrack]	James Newton Howard	Mastering
2006	Greatest Hits: The Atlantic Years		Mastering
2006	Hello I Must Be	Kip Boardman	Mastering
2006	Ho: A Dan Band Christmas	The Dan Band	Mastering
2006	I Heard a Voice	AFI	Mastering
2006	Let's Spend Some Time	Wilton Felder	Mastering
2006	Lucky You		Mastering
2006	Micah Wolf		Mastering
2006	One Tree Hill - Music from the Television Series, Vol. 2: Friends with Benefit		Mastering
2006	Pirates of the Caribbean: Dead Man's Chest [Original Motion Picture Soundtrack]	Hans Zimmer	Mastering
2006	The Da Vinci Code [Original Motion Picture Soundtrack]	Hans Zimmer	Mastering
2006	The Prestige [Original Score]	David Julyan	Mastering
2006	Unraveling	Patrice Pike	Mastering
2006	When a Stranger Calls [Original motion Picture Soundtrack]	James Dooley	Mastering
2006	Who's Bad Now	Michael O'Neill	Mastering
2005	Who's Gonna Take Us Alive? [ESE]	The Bangkok Five	Mastering
2005	A Beautiful Lie	Thirty Seconds to Mars	Mastering
2005	An Adventure Story of Steamboy	Steve Jablonsky	Mastering
2005	Back to Soul	Mr.	Mastering
2005	Bad News Bears (Original Soundtrack)		Mastering
2005	Borne	Borne	Mastering
2005	Def Jazz		Mastering
2005	Fever Pitch [2005 Original Soundtrack]		Mastering
2005	Hail to the Queen	Leerone	Mastering
2005	Hitch		Mastering
2005	Just Like Heaven [Soundtrack]		Mastering
2005	King's Ransom: The Album		Mastering
2005	Mad Hot Ballroom		Mastering
2005	Must Love Dogs		Mastering
2005	Never Trust Anything That Bleeds	American Eyes	Mastering
2005	North Country		Mastering
2005	Nothing Left to Hide	Cory Morrow	Mastering
2005	Party Fever [Maxi Single]	Nayo	Mastering
2005	Pushing Through the Seasons	Mashlin	Mastering
2005	Sahara		Mastering
2005	Sahara [Original Motion Picture Score]	Clint Mansell	Mastering
2005	Silver Rain	Marcus Miller	Mastering
2005	Solace	Ion Dissonance	Mastering
2005	EThe Dan Band Liv	The Dan Band	Mastering
2005	The Feeding	American Head Charge	Mastering
2005	The First Word Is the Hardest	Four Day Hombre	Mastering
2005	The Overture & the Underscore	Sarah Blasko	Mastering
2005	The Sisterhood of the Traveling Pants [Original Soundtrack]		Mastering
2005	The Warriors EP, Vol. 2	P.O.D.	Mastering
2005	Tijuana Bullfight	Tijuana Bullfight	Mastering
2005	To Walk a Middle Course	Kylesa	Mastering
2005	Troublesome Bubblegum	Electrocute	Mastering
2005	Undressing Underwater	Rusty Anderson	Mastering
2005	Weeds: Music from the Original Series		Mastering
2004	Buen Viaje	Alejandro Lerner	Mastering
2004	Devout/The Modern Hymn	Scatter the Ashes	Mastering
2004	Final Straw	Snow Patrol	Mastering
2004	Finding Neverland [Original Motion Picture Soundtrack]	Jan A.P. Kaczmarek	Mastering
2004	Garfield: The Movie		Mastering
2004	Glow	Unjust	Mastering
2004	Harold & Kumar Go to White Castle		Mastering
2004	Hey, That's Funny! Comedy's Greatest Hits		Mastering
2004	Holding Space	James L. Venable	Mastering
2004	Hymns	Beth Nielsen Chapman	Mastering
2004	Jazz Farm	Scott Farr	Mastering
2004	Last Wild Place	Lacy J. Dalton	Mastering
2004	Leaving the Ways	The Briggs	Mastering
2004	Matters	Pulley	Mastering
2004	Maybe This Christmas Tree		Mastering
2004	Mean Girls		Mastering
2004	New York Minute		Mastering
2004	Songs and Artists That Inspired Fahrenheit 9/11		Mastering
2004	Spider-Man 2 [Original Soundtrack]	Danny Elfman	Mastering
2004	Spitting Games	Snow Patrol	Mastering
2004	Stuck in the Suburbs		Mastering
2004	The Fundamental Component	Byzantine	Mastering
2004	The Gorge	Dave Matthews Band	Mastering
2004	This Darkened Heart	All That Remains	Mastering
2004	Too Much Heaven: Songs of the Brothers Gibb	Bee Gees	Mastering
2004	Tripped into Divine	Dexter Freebish	Mastering
2004	Uptown Music for Downtown Kids	Fredalba	Mastering
2004	When It All Comes Down	Home Grown	Mastering
2003	As the Palaces Burn	Lamb of God	Mastering
2003	Better Angels	Jim Evans	Mastering
2003	Charlie's Angels: Full Throttle		Mastering
2003	Come Poop with Me	Triumph the Insult Comic Dog	Mastering
2003	Dangerous Dreams	Moving Units	Mastering
2003	Dream Factor	Jack Casady	Mastering
2003	From the Ashes	Osmium	Mastering
2003	Last Call	Betty Blowtorch	Mastering
2003	Maybe This Christmas, Too		Mastering
2003	Open Wide This Window	GlassByrd	Mastering
2003	Scary Movie 3		Mastering
2003	Seasons Change	Edgewater	Mastering
2003	Storyteller	Donovan	Mastering
2003	Syl	Strapping Young Lad	Mastering
2003	Take a Look in the Mirror	Korn	Mastering
2003	The War of Women	Joe Firstman Love	Mastering
2003	Uncivilized Love	Gus Black	Mastering
2003	Welcome to the Middle	Laguardia	Mastering
2003	Wonderland	Radiation 4	Mastering
2003	Wonderland [Original Soundtrack]		Mastering
2002	A Christmas Gift of Love	Barry Manilow	Mastering
2002	Changes	Kelly Osbourne	Mastering
2002	Divine Discontent	Sixpence None the Richer	Mastering
2002	Dogtown and Z-Boys		Mastering
2002	Exactly What You Think It Is	Sour	Mastering
2002	F=KX Rebota	Resorte	Mastering
2002	Forty Licks	The Rolling Stones	Mastering
2002	NASCAR on Fox: Crank It Up		Mastering
2002	Not 4 Sale	Sammy Hagar	Mastering
2002	Pacifier	Pacifier / Shihad	Mastering
2002	Real As the Memory	Zach Ziskin	Mastering
2002	Red Letter Days	The Wallflowers	Mastering
2002	Reverse	The Trace	Mastering
2002	See the Light	True Vibe	Mastering
2002	Spider-Man: Music from and Inspired By		Digital Editing
2002	The Scorpion King [Soundtrack]		Digital Editing
2002	The Truth About Charlie		Mastering
2002	Through the Looking Glass	Toto	Digital Editing
2002	Volume	Flipp	Digital Editing
2002	XXX		Digital Editing
2001	American Pie 2		Digital Editing
2001	Craving Theo	Craving Theo	Digital Editing
2001	Episodes	Second Nature	Mixing, Mastering
2000	Dead Man's Radio	The End	Engineer
1999	What Is Hip?: The Tower of Power Anthology	Tower of Power	Assistant Engineer
1997	Red Hot + Latin: Silencio = Muerte		Engineer, Mixing
1995	Silk	Silk	Engineer
1994	It's a Natural Thang	For Real	Engineer
1994	Shaq-Fu: Da Return	Shaquille O'Neal	Engineer
1994	Zig Zag	Tha Mexakinz	Engineer
1993	Domino	Domino	Engineer
1993	Free Us Colored Kids	ExJuvenile Committeeample	Engineer
1993	T.O.P.	Tower of Power	Assistant Engineer
1992	Bitch Betta Have My Money	AMG	Assistant Engineer
1992	Ingénue	k.d. lang	Assistant Engineer
1992	Menace II Society		Engineer
1992	Paid the Cost	Penthouse Players Clique	Engineer
1992	Way 2 Fonky	DJ Quik	Engineer, Mixing
1991	2nd II None	2nd II None	Engineer

== As an Educator ==
Louie has worked at the acclaimed Long Beach City College Commercial Music Program as an adjunct professor teaching mastering and engineering classes.
