= 1993 in music =

This is a summary of significant events in music in 1993.

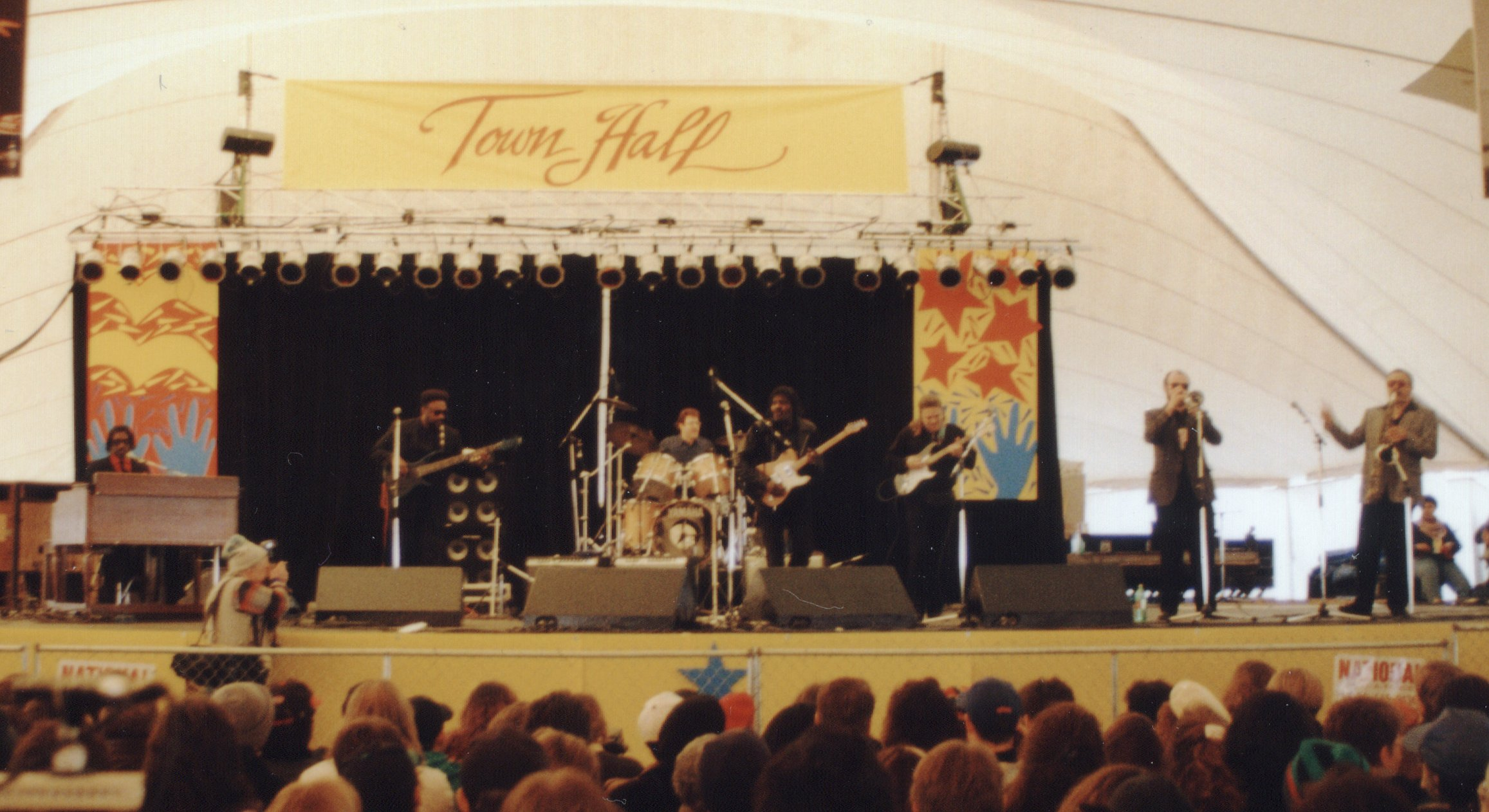
Albert Collins playing event on Washington Mall before the inauguration of US President Bill Clinton.

== Specific locations ==
- 1993 in British music
- 1993 in Norwegian music
- 1993 in Scandinavian music
- 1993 in South Korean music

== Specific genres ==
- 1993 in country music
- 1993 in heavy metal music
- 1993 in hip-hop
- 1993 in jazz
- 1993 in Latin music
- 1993 in progressive rock

== Events ==
=== January–February ===
- January 8 – The U.S. Postal Service issues an Elvis Presley stamp. The design was voted on in February 1992.
- January 9 – The Bodyguard: Original Soundtrack Album becomes the first album in history, since the Nielsen SoundScan introduced a computerized sales monitoring system in May 1992, to sell over 1 million copies in one week in the US.
- January 12 – Cream reunites for a performance at their Rock and Roll Hall of Fame induction ceremony in Los Angeles, USA. Other inductees include Creedence Clearwater Revival, Ruth Brown, The Doors, Van Morrison, and Sly & The Family Stone.
- January 13 – Bobby Brown is arrested in Augusta, Georgia, USA for simulating a sex act onstage.
- January 24–February 1 – The Big Day Out festival takes place in Australia, expanding from its original Sydney venue to include Melbourne, Perth and Adelaide. The festival is headlined by Iggy Pop and Sonic Youth.
- January 25 – Musician and anti-government activist Fela Anikulapo-Kuti is charged with murder and conspiracy after (according to the Nigerian police) an electrician was beaten to death at his home by his bodyguards.
- January 31 – Michael Jackson plays the halftime show of Super Bowl XXVII. The performance is a ratings success and begins a trend of the NFL signing big-name acts to play at the Super Bowl in order to increase the spectacle and hype surrounding the game.
- February 10 – Oprah Winfrey interviews Michael Jackson during a US television prime time special. It becomes the most watched interview in television history and is Jackson's first in fourteen years.
- February 14 – Harry Nilsson suffers a non-fatal heart attack.
- February 24 – The 35th Annual Grammy Awards are presented in Los Angeles, hosted by Garry Shandling. Eric Clapton wins six awards out of nine nominations.

=== March–April ===
- March 4 – Patti LaBelle receives a star on the Hollywood Walk of Fame in Hollywood, USA.
- March 6 – Whitney Houston's single "I Will Always Love You" posts its 14th week at number one in the US.
- March 20–28 – The second Kempsey Country Music Heritage Week is held in Kempsey, New South Wales.
- March 22 – Depeche Mode hits number one in U.S on the Billboard 200 with the album Songs of Faith and Devotion.
- March 23 – Luciano Pavarotti undergoes surgery in Rome to remove part of the cartilage in his right knee, after cancelling his La Scala debut of I Pagliacci when he could no longer stand because of acute pain.
- March 29 – Suede release their eponymous debut album. It enters the album chart at number 1 in the UK, setting a new record for the fastest-selling debut album by a UK act in Britain.
- April 12
  - Actress Lisa Bonet files for divorce from Lenny Kravitz, after a two-year separation.
  - The Grateful Dead sing "The Star-Spangled Banner" at the San Francisco Giants' home opener at Candlestick Park.
- April 17 – The Bangles' Susanna Hoffs marries screenwriter Jay Roach in Los Angeles, USA.
- April 21 – Former Rolling Stones bassist Bill Wyman marries designer Suzanne Accosta in France.
- April 22 – The Who's Tommy opens on Broadway.
- April 24 – Willie Nelson, John Cougar Mellencamp, Neil Young and more than 30 other artists perform at Farm Aid 6 in Ames, Iowa, US.
- April 29 – An animated version of Barry White appears on an episode of the US television cartoon series, The Simpsons.

=== May–June ===
- May 6 – A government official announced that the Malaysian cabinet will commission musicians to speed up the tempo of the country's national anthem in an effort to make it more dynamic.
- May 10 – Hugh Whitaker, former drummer of The Housemartins, is sentenced to six years in jail for attacking an ex–business partner with an axe.
- May 15 – The 1993 Eurovision Song Contest, held at Green Glens Arena in Millstreet, Ireland, is won by singer Niamh Kavanagh, representing the host country with the song "In Your Eyes". Ireland equal France and Luxembourg's tally of five total Eurovision victories.
- Janet Jackson's "That's The Way Love Goes" reaches number one on the Billboard Hot 100 and spends eight consecutive weeks at the top spot.
- May 18 - Janet Jackson releases her 5th studio album titled Janet. It becomes her 3rd consecutive album to debut at number one on the Billboard 200, becoming the first album by a female artist to debut at number one in the Nielsen SoundScan Era. It also becomes the highest first week album sales by a female artist in history during that time, selling 350,000 copies.
- May 27 – June 6 – The second Brisbane Biennial International Music Festival is held.
- June 7
  - On his 35th birthday, Prince announces that he is changing his name to an unpronounceable symbol. This led to him being called The Artist Formerly Known as Prince until 2000.

=== July–August ===
- July 5 – Björk releases her 1st solo studio album Debut.
- July 7 – Singer Mia Zapata of punk band The Gits is found dead after being beaten, sexually assaulted and strangled in the Capitol Hill district of Seattle. Her murder goes unsolved for a decade until DNA evidence leads to an arrest and conviction.
- July 17 – Guns N' Roses play the final gig on their Use Your Illusion Tour. This will be the last time the original band plays together on stage until 2016.
- July 18 – At a Lollapalooza concert in Philadelphia, Rage Against the Machine uses their entire 14-minute performance time to protest their single "Killing in the Name" being banned from radio. With only guitar feedback for sound, the group appears on stage naked with the letters "PMRC" painted on their chests and electrical duct tape over their mouths.
- July 21 – Ilaiyaraaja becomes the first Asian composer to have a symphony performed by a major UK orchestra (Royal Philharmonic Orchestra).
- August 3 – Aharon Gorev's Klezmer Symphony, the first of its kind, is featured on the opening concert of the sixth annual International Klezmer Festival in Safed, Israel.
- August 5 – Singer Natalie Merchant announces on MTV that she is leaving 10,000 Maniacs after 12 years in the band.
- August 10 – Mayhem guitarist Euronymous is stabbed to death by fellow band member Varg Vikernes in Oslo, Norway, causing the temporary end of Mayhem.
- August 24 – News breaks to the public that Michael Jackson is being investigated on allegations of child molestation.
- August 28 – Bruce Dickinson plays his final show with Iron Maiden (until his return in 1999) in London. The show is broadcast on British television, and later released on VHS and DVD.

=== September–October ===
- September 2 – Snoop Dogg and his bodyguard are charged with the August 25 murder of a 20-year-old gang member in a drive-by shooting. They are cleared of the charges in 1996.
- September 14 – A civil lawsuit is filed against Michael Jackson by thirteen-year-old Jordan Chandler and his parents, accusing the singer of sexually abusing the boy over the course of their friendship.
- September 20 – Depeche Mode becomes among the earliest bands to go on the Internet to interact with fans, as the group holds a question-and-answer session on AOL. The event is marred by technical difficulties as many participants, including the band members themselves, have trouble logging on to the chat.
- September 25 – Madonna starts the Girlie Show, her fourth world tour, in London, England. The tour marked her first concerts in South America, Oceania and the Middle East.
- September 30 – October 2 – The Abu Ghosh Vocal Music Festival is held, featuring music of Jewish, Christian, and Moslem cultural traditions, and a performance of Handel's Messiah by the Ave Sol Choir from Riga and the Rehovot Camerata Orchestra directed by Avner Biron.
- October 1 – MTV Latin America is launched.
- October 1–3 – Annual Australian Bush Music Festival takes place in Glen Innes.
- October 9 – The 22nd OTI Festival, held at the Teatro Principal in Valencia, Spain, is won by the song "Enamorarse", written by Alejandro Abad and Josep Llobell, and performed by Ana Reverte representing Spain.
- October 17 – Savatage guitarist and co-founder Christopher Michael "Criss" Oliva killed in a car accident.
- October 31 – Tupac Shakur is arrested and charged with shooting two off-duty police officers in Atlanta. The charges are later dropped.

=== November–December ===
- November 6–7 – The second annual Tooheys Sydney Country Music Festival, is held at Clarendon (Hawkesbury) Racecourse, in Sydney.
- November 11 – Michael Jackson ends his Dangerous World Tour in Mexico City, Mexico.
- November 12 – Sir Peter Maxwell Davies, responding to an announcement by the Arts Council that they would fund only two of London's four orchestras starting in 1994, confirms he plans to hand back his knighthood and consider leaving the country if this support were to be withdrawn.
- November 18 – Nirvana play their unplugged concert in New York for MTV.
- November 19 – Pearl Jam singer Eddie Vedder is arrested in New Orleans, USA on charges of public drunkenness after a bar room brawl.
- November 19 – Madonna ends her tour in Tokyo, Japan.
- November 24 - Janet Jackson begins her Janet World Tour in Cincinnati, Ohio. The opening concert was covered by MTV in a television special featuring brief live performances and coverage from the show.
- November 30 - Faith No More guitarist Jim Martin is fired from the band due to creative differences within the band.
- December 22 – Michael Jackson makes his first public statement regarding the child molestation allegations leveled against him. In a videotaped address, Jackson calls the accusations "totally false" and asks the public to "wait to hear the truth before you label or condemn me."
- December 31 – The 22nd annual New Year's Rockin' Eve special airs on ABC, with appearances by Brooks & Dunn, Daryl Hall, Kiss, Joey Lawrence, SWV, and Barry Manilow.

=== Also in 1993 ===
- Rick Astley retires from the music industry at the age of 27 after selling 40 million records in a five-year period.
- Keiko Abe becomes the first woman to be inducted into the Percussive Arts Society Hall of Fame.

== Bands formed ==
- See Musical groups established in 1993

== Bands disbanded ==
- See Musical groups disestablished in 1993

== Bands reformed ==
- See Musical groups reestablished in 1993

== Albums released ==
=== January–March ===
Date		Album	Artist	Notes
J A N U A R Y	5	Mark Collie	Mark Collie	-
J A N U A R Y	5	Slo*Blo	Cell	-
J A N U A R Y	5	Lucky Thirteen	Neil Young	Compilation + unreleased
J A N U A R Y	11	The Way We Walk, Volume Two: The Longs	Genesis	Live
J A N U A R Y	11	So Close	Dina Carroll	-
J A N U A R Y	11	Surfing on Sine Waves	Polygon Window	Aphex Twin
J A N U A R Y	12	American Grafishy	Flipper	-
J A N U A R Y	12	Blue Funk	Heavy D & the Boyz	-
J A N U A R Y	12	Edge of Excess	Triumph	US
J A N U A R Y	12	No Cure for Cancer	Denis Leary	-
J A N U A R Y	12	Tha Triflin' Album	King Tee	-
J A N U A R Y	12	Wake Up Screaming	Every Mother's Nightmare	-
J A N U A R Y	15	Wiggle	Screeching Weasel	-
J A N U A R Y	18	Songs from the Mirror	Fish	Covers
J A N U A R Y	19	12 Inches of Snow	Snow	-
J A N U A R Y	19	Body, Mind, Soul	Debbie Gibson	-
J A N U A R Y	19	The Erosion of Sanity	Gorguts	-
J A N U A R Y	19	The Juliet Letters	Elvis Costello and The Brodsky Quartet	-
J A N U A R Y	19	The Wheel	Rosanne Cash	-
J A N U A R Y	19	Friends Can Be Lovers	Dionne Warwick	-
J A N U A R Y	25	Barry Live in Britain	Barry Manilow	Live
J A N U A R Y	25	Dusk	The The	-
J A N U A R Y	25	Perverse	Jesus Jones	-
J A N U A R Y	25	Star	Belly	UK
J A N U A R Y	26	Fire in the Dark	Billy Dean	-
F E B R U A R Y	1	Off the Ground	Paul McCartney	-
F E B R U A R Y	1	Gorgeous	808 State	-
F E B R U A R Y	1	Objection Overruled	Accept	-
F E B R U A R Y	2	Black Mafia Life	Above the Law	-
F E B R U A R Y	2	In God We Trust	Brand Nubian	-
F E B R U A R Y	2	Joey Lawrence	Joey Lawrence	Debut
F E B R U A R Y	2	Rift	Phish	-
F E B R U A R Y	2	Star	Belly	US
F E B R U A R Y	5	Earth 2	Earth	Debut
F E B R U A R Y	8	Native Tongue	Poison	-
F E B R U A R Y	8	Wandering Spirit	Mick Jagger	-
F E B R U A R Y	9	Music	311	-
F E B R U A R Y	9	Reachin' (A New Refutation of Time and Space)	Digable Planets	-
F E B R U A R Y	9	Slip	Quicksand	-
F E B R U A R Y	9	Spilt Milk	Jellyfish	-
F E B R U A R Y	9	Where You Been	Dinosaur Jr.	-
F E B R U A R Y	10	On the Mouth	Superchunk	-
F E B R U A R Y	14	Puddle Dive	Ani DiFranco	-
F E B R U A R Y	15	Duran Duran	Duran Duran	
F E B R U A R Y	15	Serenades	Anathema	-
F E B R U A R Y	15	Under a Funeral Moon	Darkthrone	-
F E B R U A R Y	15	Walthamstow	East 17	Debut
F E B R U A R Y	16	Body Exit Mind	New Fast Automatic Daffodils	-
F E B R U A R Y	16	The Last Rebel	Lynyrd Skynyrd	-
F E B R U A R Y	16	Sarsippius' Ark	Infectious Grooves	-
F E B R U A R Y	16	Strictly 4 My N.I.G.G.A.Z...	2Pac	-
F E B R U A R Y	16	Tabula Rasa	Einstürzende Neubauten	-
F E B R U A R Y	22	Pablo Honey	Radiohead	Debut
F E B R U A R Y	22	Happy Nation	Ace of Base	International release
F E B R U A R Y	22	New Wave	The Auteurs	-
F E B R U A R Y	23	19 Naughty III	Naughty by Nature	-
F E B R U A R Y	23	Beach of the War Goddess	Caron Wheeler	-
F E B R U A R Y	23	Boy Krazy	Boy Krazy	-
F E B R U A R Y	23	The Crying Game: Original Motion Picture Soundtrack Album	Various Artists	Soundtrack
F E B R U A R Y	23	Fuzzy	Grant Lee Buffalo	-
F E B R U A R Y	23	Hard Workin' Man	Brooks & Dunn	-
F E B R U A R Y	23	Human Cannonball	School of Fish	-
F E B R U A R Y	23	Live: Right Here, Right Now	Van Halen	2x CD, Live
F E B R U A R Y	23	Magic & Madness	Circus of Power	-
F E B R U A R Y	23	Respect	Robyn Hitchcock	-
F E B R U A R Y	23	Scenes from the Second Storey	The God Machine	-
F E B R U A R Y	23	Sister Sweetly	Big Head Todd and the Monsters	-
F E B R U A R Y	23	Slow Dancing with the Moon	Dolly Parton	-
F E B R U A R Y	23	Smoke	Drivin N Cryin	-
F E B R U A R Y	23	Superstar Car Wash	Goo Goo Dolls	-
F E B R U A R Y	?	Mr. Machinery Operator	Firehose	-
F E B R U A R Y	?	ShashavaGlava	Spiderbait	Debut
M A R C H	1	Ten Summoner's Tales	Sting	-
M A R C H	1	Everybody Else Is Doing It, So Why Can't We?	The Cranberries	Debut
M A R C H	1	Against Perfection	Adorable	Debut
M A R C H	2	CB4	Various Artists	Soundtrack
M A R C H	2	Other Voices, Other Rooms	Nanci Griffith	-
M A R C H	2	Stain	Living Colour	-
M A R C H	2	The Weedkiller's Daughter	John & Mary	US
M A R C H	5	Time for Mercy	Jann Arden	Debut
M A R C H	5	Cereal Killer Soundtrack	Green Jellÿ	
M A R C H	8	Frank Black	Frank Black	-
M A R C H	9	Alibis	Tracy Lawrence	-
M A R C H	9	Animals with Human Intelligence	Enuff Z'nuff	-
M A R C H	9	Are You Gonna Go My Way	Lenny Kravitz	-
M A R C H	9	The Best of Van Morrison Volume Two	Van Morrison	Compilation
M A R C H	9	Everyday	Widespread Panic	-
M A R C H	9	Feels Like Rain	Buddy Guy	-
M A R C H	9	Link	Øystein Sevåg	-
M A R C H	9	Numb	Hammerbox	-
M A R C H	9	Palomino Road	Palomino Road	-
M A R C H	9	So Tough	Saint Etienne	-
M A R C H	9	Till Death Do Us Part	Geto Boys	-
M A R C H	15	Coverdale-Page	Coverdale-Page	-
M A R C H	16	Colour of Your Dreams	Carole King	-
M A R C H	16	I Hear Black	Overkill	-
M A R C H	16	The Polyfuze Method	Kid Rock	-
M A R C H	22	A Real Live One	Iron Maiden	Live
M A R C H	22	Songs of Faith and Devotion	Depeche Mode	-
M A R C H	22	Space Age Bachelor Pad Music	Stereolab	EP
M A R C H	22	Westing (By Musket and Sextant)	Pavement	Compilation
M A R C H	23	Ahead of Their Time	The Mothers of Invention	Live 1968
M A R C H	23	The Bliss Album...? (Vibrations of Love and Anger and the Ponderance of Life and Existence)	P.M. Dawn	-
M A R C H	23	Copacetic	Velocity Girl	-
M A R C H	23	For the Beauty of Wynona	Daniel Lanois	-
M A R C H	23	Glazed	Mystery Machine	-
M A R C H	23	Home Invasion	Ice-T	-
M A R C H	23	In a Word or 2	Monie Love	-
M A R C H	23	Independent Worm Saloon	Butthole Surfers	-
M A R C H	23	Joshua Redman	Joshua Redman	Debut
M A R C H	23	Songs from the Rain	Hothouse Flowers	-
M A R C H	23	This Time	Dwight Yoakam	-
M A R C H	25	Big Body	P-Model	-
M A R C H	25	Peligro	Shakira	-
M A R C H	29	Phobia	The Kinks	-
M A R C H	29	Suede	Suede	-
M A R C H	30	14 Shots to the Dome	LL Cool J	-
M A R C H	30	Ask Questions Later	Cop Shoot Cop	-
M A R C H	30	Bacdafucup	Onyx	Debut
M A R C H	30	Here Come the Lords	Lords of the Underground	Debut
M A R C H	30	Suspiria	Miranda Sex Garden	-
M A R C H	?	Crimson and Blue	Phil Keaggy	
M A R C H	?	Instant Replay	Pizzicato Five	Live
M A R C H	?	Kissers and Killers	The Choir	

=== April–June ===
Date		Album	Artist	Notes
A P R I L	5	Black Tie White Noise	David Bowie	-
A P R I L	6	Beaster	Sugar	EP
A P R I L	6	Edge of Thorns	Savatage	-
A P R I L	6	Harbor Lights	Bruce Hornsby	-
A P R I L	6	In My Time	Yanni	-
A P R I L	6	Save His Soul	Blues Traveler	-
A P R I L	6	Story of My Life	Pere Ubu	-
A P R I L	6	Superjudge	Monster Magnet	-
A P R I L	6	Undertow	Tool	Debut
A P R I L	13	In Concert/MTV Plugged	Bruce Springsteen	Live
A P R I L	13	Learning to Flinch	Warren Zevon	Live
A P R I L	13	San Francisco Days	Chris Isaak	-
A P R I L	13	Taxi	Bryan Ferry	-
A P R I L	13	Today's Active Lifestyles	Polvo	-
A P R I L	13	Waiting for You	Gordon Lightfoot	-
A P R I L	19	Five Live	George Michael and Queen	Live EP
A P R I L	19	Jurassic Shift	Ozric Tentacles	-
A P R I L	20	Bang!	World Party	-
A P R I L	20	Dive	Sarah Brightman	-
A P R I L	20	Earth and Sun and Moon	Midnight Oil	-
A P R I L	20	The Full-Custom Gospel Sounds of the Reverend Horton Heat	The Reverend Horton Heat	-
A P R I L	20	Get a Grip	Aerosmith	-
A P R I L	20	The Grand Tour	Aaron Neville	-
A P R I L	20	Pork Soda	Primus	-
A P R I L	20	Shania Twain	Shania Twain	-
A P R I L	20	Toby Keith	Toby Keith	-
A P R I L	21	Deaf Dumb Blind	Clawfinger	Debut
A P R I L	26	Bubble & Scrape	Sebadoh	-
A P R I L	26	The Infotainment Scan	The Fall	-
A P R I L	27	Exposed	Vince Neil	-
A P R I L	27	Frosting on the Beater	The Posies	-
A P R I L	27	Hurry Sundown	McBride & the Ride	-
A P R I L	27	The New Breed	MC Breed	-
A P R I L	27	Porno for Pyros	Porno for Pyros	-
A P R I L	27	Shame	Brad	-
A P R I L	28	Innercity Griots	Freestyle Fellowship	-
M A Y	1	Ultimate Alternative Wavers	Built to Spill	Debut
M A Y	3	Banba	Clannad	-
M A Y	3	Formaldehyde	Terrorvision	Debut
M A Y	3	Republic	New Order	-
M A Y	4	Down with the King	Run–D.M.C.	-
M A Y	4	Dragline	Paw	-
M A Y	4	Kill My Landlord	The Coup	Debut
M A Y	4	Live!	Selena	Live
M A Y	4	Rid of Me	PJ Harvey	-
M A Y	4	SlaughtaHouse	Masta Ace	-
M A Y	4	Thousand Roads	David Crosby	-
M A Y	4	Which Doobie U B?	Funkdoobiest	-
M A Y	7	With Fear I Kiss the Burning Darkness	At the Gates	-
M A Y	10	The Miracle of Sound in Motion	Steel Pole Bath Tub	-
M A Y	10	Modern Life Is Rubbish	Blur	-
M A Y	10	On the Night	Dire Straits	Live
M A Y	10	Rancid	Rancid	-
M A Y	11	Out of Body	The Hooters	-
M A Y	11	Screams and Whispers	Anacrusis	-
M A Y	11	Symphony or Damn	Terence Trent D'Arby	-
M A Y	11	Tell Me Why	Wynonna Judd	-
M A Y	11	Whatever	Aimee Mann	Debut
M A Y	17	Dreamland	Aztec Camera	-
M A Y	17	The New Jim Jones	Dre Dog	-
M A Y	18	Alive III	Kiss	Live
M A Y	18	Pull	Winger	
M A Y	18	Janet	Janet Jackson	US
M A Y	18	Jazzmatazz, Vol. 1	Guru	-
M A Y	18	Painted Desert Serenade	Joshua Kadison	-
M A Y	19	Organix	The Roots	Debut
M A Y	21	Why Do They Call Me Mr. Happy?	Nomeansno	-
M A Y	24	Extra Width	The Jon Spencer Blues Explosion	-
M A Y	24	Girl +	Boss Hog	-
M A Y	24	More ABBA Gold: More ABBA Hits	ABBA	Greatest Hits
M A Y	24	Orbital	Orbital	"The Brown Album" or "Orbital 2"
M A Y	24	Unplugged...and Seated	Rod Stewart	Live
M A Y	24	Dream Harder	The Waterboys	-
M A Y	25	Give a Monkey a Brain and He'll Swear He's the Center of the Universe	Fishbone	-
M A Y	25	Kamakiriad	Donald Fagen	-
M A Y	25	Me Amarás	Ricky Martin	-
M A Y	25	Sound of White Noise	Anthrax	-
M A Y	25	Born Gangstaz	Boss	-
M A Y	26	Charlie Parker on Dial: The Complete Sessions	Charlie Parker	-
M A Y	31	Chameleon	Helloween	-
M A Y	31	How to Clean Everything	Propagandhi	Debut
M A Y	31	The Daily Grind	No Use for a Name	EP
M A Y	?	I've Seen Everything	Trash Can Sinatras	-
M A Y	?	Tribal Thunder	Dick Dale	-
J U N E	1	Boces	Mercury Rev	-
J U N E	1	Covenant	Morbid Angel	-
J U N E	1	Far Gone	Love Battery	-
J U N E	1	Gravity's Rainbow	Pat Benatar	-
J U N E	1	Hootie Mack	Bell Biv DeVoe	-
J U N E	1	North from Here	Sentenced	-
J U N E	1	Souvlaki	Slowdive	-
J U N E	1	Too Long in Exile	Van Morrison	-
J U N E	7	Elemental	Tears for Fears	-
J U N E	7	Live & Loud	Ozzy Osbourne	Live
J U N E	7	There Is No-One What Will Take Care of You	Palace Brothers	Debut
J U N E	8	Breaking Silence	Janis Ian	-
J U N E	8	Hey Zeus!	X	-
J U N E	8	Last Action Hero	Various Artists	Soundtrack
J U N E	8	Miracle Mile	Guardian	
J U N E	8	Pottymouth	Bratmobile	-
J U N E	8	Saturation	Urge Overkill	-
J U N E	8	Space In Your Face	Galactic Cowboys	-
J U N E	8	Supermodel of the World	RuPaul	-
J U N E	8	Wide River	Steve Miller Band	-
J U N E	11	Mood Swings	Harem Scarem	-
J U N E	14	Emergency on Planet Earth	Jamiroquai	Debut
J U N E	14	Liberator	Orchestral Manoeuvres in the Dark	-
J U N E	14	Trade Test Transmissions	Buzzcocks	-
J U N E	15	14 Songs	Paul Westerberg	
J U N E	15	Dancing the Blues	Taj Mahal	-
J U N E	15	Neil Young Unplugged	Neil Young	Live
J U N E	15	The World Should Know	Burning Spear	-
J U N E	15	Psychoderelict	Pete Townshend	
J U N E	21	Ginger	Speedy J	-
J U N E	21	Gold Against the Soul	Manic Street Preachers	-
J U N E	21	Joy and Blues	Ziggy Marley and the Melody Makers	-
J U N E	21	A Storm in Heaven	Verve	Debut
J U N E	22	Hat Full of Stars	Cyndi Lauper	-
J U N E	22	Individual Thought Patterns	Death	-
J U N E	22	Mi Tierra	Gloria Estefan	-
J U N E	22	All Samples Cleared!	Biz Markie	-
J U N E	22	Ain't No Other	MC Lyte	-
J U N E	22	Aries	Luis Miguel	-
J U N E	22	Exile in Guyville	Liz Phair	-
J U N E	22	Experience the Divine	Bette Midler	Greatest Hits
J U N E	22	Here's to New Dreams	Raven-Symoné	Debut
J U N E	22	Hints Allegations and Things Left Unsaid	Collective Soul	Debut
J U N E	22	It Won't Be the Last	Billy Ray Cyrus	-
J U N E	22	Painkillers	Babes in Toyland	-
J U N E	22	Sons of Soul	Tony! Toni! Toné!	-
J U N E	22	Transmissions from the Satellite Heart	The Flaming Lips	-
J U N E	25	Mortal Kombat II: Music from the Arcade Game Soundtrack	Dan Forden	limited-time offer
J U N E	28	Cyberpunk	Billy Idol	-
J U N E	28	Insanity and Genius	Gamma Ray	-
J U N E	29	Back to Broadway	Barbra Streisand	-
J U N E	29	Crazy Legs	Jeff Beck	Gene Vincent covers
J U N E	29	Good Vibrations: Thirty Years of The Beach Boys	The Beach Boys	Box set
J U N E	29	Poetic Justice	Various Artists	Soundtrack
J U N E	30	In on the Kill Taker	Fugazi	-
J U N E	?	Audience with the Mind	The House of Love	-

=== July–September ===
Date		Album	Artist	Notes
J U L Y	1	Ultraelectromagneticpop!	Eraserheads	Debut
J U L Y	5	Debut	Björk	Solo Debut
J U L Y	5	Zooropa	U2	-
J U L Y	5	Tales of Ephidrina	Amorphous Androgynous	-
J U L Y	5	Julius Caesar	Smog	-
J U L Y	6	No World Order	TR-i (Todd Rundgren)	-
J U L Y	6	Sweet Relief: A Benefit for Victoria Williams	Various Artists	Victoria Williams tribute
J U L Y	6	Vagina Diner	Akinyele	Debut
J U L Y	7	Fake Train	Unwound	Debut
J U L Y	12	The Sound of Speed	The Jesus and Mary Chain	Compilation
J U L Y	13	Altered Beast	Matthew Sweet	-
J U L Y	13	Sleeper	Tribe	-
J U L Y	13	Toni Braxton	Toni Braxton	Debut
J U L Y	19	Siamese Dream	The Smashing Pumpkins	-
J U L Y	19	The Battle Rages On...	Deep Purple	-
J U L Y	19	Debravation	Deborah Harry	UK
J U L Y	20	The Anthology	Bachman–Turner Overdrive	Compilation
J U L Y	20	Bargainville	Moxy Früvous	-
J U L Y	20	Black Sunday	Cypress Hill	-
J U L Y	20	Candlebox	Candlebox	-
J U L Y	20	Chrome	Catherine Wheel	-
J U L Y	20	Picture of Health	The Headstones	-
J U L Y	20	Whoomp! (There It Is)	Tag Team	-
J U L Y	20	Bill	Tripping Daisy	Debut, re-release
J U L Y	26	Evolution	Oleta Adams	-
J U L Y	26	Full-On Bloom	Gigolo Aunts	EP
J U L Y	27	Haircut	George Thorogood	-
J U L Y	27	Promises and Lies	UB40	-
J U L Y	27	Represent	Fat Joe da Gangsta	-
J U L Y	27	Sex & Religion	Vai	-
J U L Y	?	Tease Me	Chaka Demus & Pliers	-
J U L Y	?	Yoreru Omoi	Zard	-
A U G U S T	2	Now That's What I Call Music! 25	Various Artists	Compilation UK
A U G U S T	3	Become What You Are	The Juliana Hatfield Three	-
A U G U S T	3	Da Bomb	Kris Kross	-
A U G U S T	3	The Outer Limits	Voivod	-
A U G U S T	3	Tuesday Night Music Club	Sheryl Crow	-
A U G U S T	3	Voice of Jamaica	Buju Banton	-
A U G U S T	9	Perfect Teeth	Unrest	
A U G U S T	10	Dig	I Mother Earth	-
A U G U S T	10	Emergency on Planet Earth	Jamiroquai	US
A U G U S T	10	Live	James Taylor	2-disc; Live
A U G U S T	10	River of Dreams	Billy Joel	-
A U G U S T	10	Beneath the Rhythm and Sound	The Ocean Blue	-
A U G U S T	10	Transient Random-Noise Bursts with Announcements	Stereolab	-
A U G U S T	13	Dig	Dig	Debut
A U G U S T	16	Breaking Things	All	-
A U G U S T	16	Liberation	The Divine Comedy	-
A U G U S T	16	Giant Steps	The Boo Radleys	-
A U G U S T	17	Bloody Kisses	Type O Negative	-
A U G U S T	17	Comin' Out Hard	8Ball & MJG	-
A U G U S T	17	Earth vs the Wildhearts	The Wildhearts	-
A U G U S T	17	Enemy of the Sun	Neurosis	-
A U G U S T	17	Everything	Joe	-
A U G U S T	17	Over My Heart	Laura Branigan	-
A U G U S T	17	Rise	Bad Brains	-
A U G U S T	17	Transnational Speedway League: Anthems, Anecdotes and Undeniable Truths	Clutch	Debut
A U G U S T	17	The World Is Yours	Scarface	-
A U G U S T	17	Unknown Road	Pennywise	-
A U G U S T	20	Venus Luxure No. 1 Baby	Girls Against Boys	-
A U G U S T	24	21 & Over	Tha Alkaholiks	Debut
A U G U S T	24	The 30th Anniversary Concert Celebration	Various Artists	Live Bob Dylan Tribute Concert Recording
A U G U S T	24	For the Cool in You	Babyface	-
A U G U S T	24	Kerosene Hat	Cracker	-
A U G U S T	24	Pure Pleasure	Shaggy	-
A U G U S T	24	Set the World on Fire	Annihilator	-
A U G U S T	24	Spinning Around the Sun	Jimmie Dale Gilmore	-
A U G U S T	24	The Untold Truth	Illegal	-
A U G U S T	24	You Been Played	Smooth	-
A U G U S T	30	Last Splash	The Breeders	-
A U G U S T	30	Skydancer	Dark Tranquillity	-
A U G U S T	31	Envy	Eve's Plum	-
A U G U S T	31	In Pieces	Garth Brooks	-
A U G U S T	31	Music Box	Mariah Carey	-
A U G U S T	31	Up on the Roof: Songs from the Brill Building	Neil Diamond	Covers album
S E P T E M B E R	6	Blood Music	Chapterhouse	-
S E P T E M B E R	6	Post Historic Monsters	Carter the Unstoppable Sex Machine	-
S E P T E M B E R	6	Wild Wood	Paul Weller	-
S E P T E M B E R	7	13 Above the Night	My Life with the Thrill Kill Kult	-
S E P T E M B E R	7	American Caesar	Iggy Pop	-
S E P T E M B E R	7	Human Wheels	John Mellencamp	-
S E P T E M B E R	7	Icky Mettle	Archers of Loaf	-
S E P T E M B E R	10	Grin	Coroner	-
S E P T E M B E R	13	The Album	Haddaway	-
S E P T E M B E R	13	Cuckoo	Curve	-
S E P T E M B E R	13	Show	The Cure	Live
S E P T E M B E R	13	Into the Labyrinth	Dead Can Dance	-
S E P T E M B E R	14	August and Everything After	Counting Crows	-
S E P T E M B E R	14	Cure for Pain	Morphine	-
S E P T E M B E R	14	Bat Out of Hell II: Back into Hell	Meat Loaf	-
S E P T E M B E R	14	Focus	Cynic	-
S E P T E M B E R	14	The Hits/The B-Sides	Prince	3-disc compilation; Discs 1 and 2 also sold separately
S E P T E M B E R	14	Judgement Night	Various Artists	Soundtrack
S E P T E M B E R	14	Let There Be Peace on Earth	Vince Gill	-
S E P T E M B E R	14	Some Fantastic Place	Squeeze	-
S E P T E M B E R	14	Traffic from Paradise	Rickie Lee Jones	-
S E P T E M B E R	14	War of Words	Fight	-
S E P T E M B E R	15	Under the Sun	Yōsui Inoue	-
S E P T E M B E R	20	Body & Soul	Rick Astley	-
S E P T E M B E R	21	Big Red Letter Day	Buffalo Tom	-
S E P T E M B E R	21	Buhloone Mindstate	De La Soul	-
S E P T E M B E R	21	Bump Ahead	Mr. Big	-
S E P T E M B E R	21	Concentration	Machines of Loving Grace	-
S E P T E M B E R	21	Face the Heat	Scorpions	-
S E P T E M B E R	21	Houdini	Melvins	-
S E P T E M B E R	21	In Utero	Nirvana	Official US release date. UK release on 13 September
S E P T E M B E R	21	It Ain't What U Wear, It's How U Play It	Another Bad Creation	-
S E P T E M B E R	21	The Problem with Me	Seam	-
S E P T E M B E R	21	Recipe for Hate	Bad Religion	-
S E P T E M B E R	21	Ring	The Connells	-
S E P T E M B E R	21	Something Up My Sleeve	Suzy Bogguss	-
S E P T E M B E R	21	Stone Cold World	A.L.T.	-
S E P T E M B E R	21	Wish	Joshua Redman	-
S E P T E M B E R	21	Yes I Am	Melissa Etheridge	-
S E P T E M B E R	22	Double Easy – The U.S. Singles	Happy Mondays	US-only Compilation
S E P T E M B E R	26	Aoi Sora no Shita...	Kazuyoshi Saito	-
S E P T E M B E R	27	Very	Pet Shop Boys	-
S E P T E M B E R	27	Message in a Box: The Complete Recordings	The Police	Box set
S E P T E M B E R	27	Laid	James	-
S E P T E M B E R	27	Transfusion	Powderfinger	EP
S E P T E M B E R	28	187 He Wrote	Spice 1	-
S E P T E M B E R	28	Believe in Me	Duff McKagan	-
S E P T E M B E R	28	93 'til Infinity	Souls of Mischief	-
S E P T E M B E R	28	Cowgirl's Prayer	Emmylou Harris	-
S E P T E M B E R	28	Easy Come, Easy Go	George Strait	-
S E P T E M B E R	28	Faithlift	Spirit of the West	-
S E P T E M B E R	28	Icon	Paradise Lost	-
S E P T E M B E R	28	Live Seeds	Nick Cave and the Bad Seeds	Live
S E P T E M B E R	28	Love 15	Majesty Crush	-
S E P T E M B E R	28	Morbid Florist	Anal Cunt	EP
S E P T E M B E R	28	Nothing Above My Shoulders but the Evening	Ray Lynch	-
S E P T E M B E R	28	Return of the Boom Bap	KRS-One	-
S E P T E M B E R	28	Swing'n	Hi-C	-
S E P T E M B E R	28	They're All Gonna Laugh at You!	Adam Sandler	-
S E P T E M B E R	28	Top Loader	Sugarsmack	-
S E P T E M B E R	28	Violent New Breed	Shotgun Messiah	-
S E P T E M B E R	28	Water	Saigon Kick	-
S E P T E M B E R	29	Real	Belinda Carlisle	-
S E P T E M B E R	?	Chaos A.D.	Sepultura	-
S E P T E M B E R	?	One Night in Time	Donovan	-
S E P T E M B E R	?	Shinola	Energy Orchard	-
S E P T E M B E R	?	The Stars Are So Big, the Earth Is So Small... Stay as You Are	Pram	Debut

=== October–December ===
Date		Album	Artist	Notes
O C T O B E R	1	Colours	Michael Learns to Rock	-
O C T O B E R	1	Don't Censor Me	Audio Adrenaline	-
O C T O B E R	1	Those of the Unlight	Marduk	-
O C T O B E R	4	Retro Active	Def Leppard	Compilation
O C T O B E R	4	Get into You	Dannii Minogue	-
O C T O B E R	4	Thirteen	Teenage Fanclub	-
O C T O B E R	4	Wolverine Blues	Entombed	-
O C T O B E R	4	Elegant Slumming	M People	-
O C T O B E R	5	Alapalooza	"Weird Al" Yankovic	-
O C T O B E R	5	Anodyne	Uncle Tupelo	-
O C T O B E R	5	The Body-Hat Syndrome	Digital Underground	-
O C T O B E R	5	Christmas Interpretations	Boyz II Men	Christmas
O C T O B E R	5	Dos	Altered State	-
O C T O B E R	5	Gentlemen	The Afghan Whigs	-
O C T O B E R	5	Mezcal Head	Swervedriver	-
O C T O B E R	5	Painful	Yo La Tengo	-
O C T O B E R	5	Phaseshifter	Redd Kross	-
O C T O B E R	5	So Tonight That I Might See	Mazzy Star	-
O C T O B E R	5	Steppin' Out	Tony Bennett	Fred Astaire Tribute
O C T O B E R	5	Titanic Days	Kirsty MacColl	-
O C T O B E R	5	Shame + A Sin	Robert Cray	-
O C T O B E R	8	A Bigger Piece of Sky	Robert Earl Keen	-
O C T O B E R	8	Anthem for a New Tomorrow	Screeching Weasel	-
O C T O B E R	10	C'est déjà ça	Alain Souchon	-
O C T O B E R	11	Everything Changes	Take That	-
O C T O B E R	11	Bad Vibes	Lloyd Cole	-
O C T O B E R	11	Bastards	Motörhead	-
O C T O B E R	11	Silhouette in Red	Bonnie Tyler	-
O C T O B E R	11	Soon	Tanya Tucker	-
O C T O B E R	11	Imaginary Friend	Th' Faith Healers	-
O C T O B E R	11	Tindersticks	Tindersticks	Debut
O C T O B E R	12	An Evening of Yes Music Plus	Anderson Bruford Wakeman Howe	-
O C T O B E R	12	Angst	KMFDM	-
O C T O B E R	12	Aurora Gory Alice	Letters to Cleo	-
O C T O B E R	12	Code Red	DJ Jazzy Jeff & the Fresh Prince	-
O C T O B E R	12	Come On Feel The Lemonheads	The Lemonheads	-
O C T O B E R	12	Common Thread: The Songs of the Eagles	Various Artists	Eagles tribute
O C T O B E R	12	The First Decade (1983–1993)	Michael W. Smith	Compilation
O C T O B E R	12	Hey, Man, Smell My Finger	George Clinton	-
O C T O B E R	12	Take Me as I Am	Faith Hill	-
O C T O B E R	12	T.I.M.E. (The Inner Mind's Eye)	Leaders of the New School	-
O C T O B E R	12	Very Necessary	Salt-n-Pepa	-
O C T O B E R	13	11th Song	Deep Blue Something	-
O C T O B E R	15	Zambodia	Motherhead Bug	-
O C T O B E R	18	D-Ream On Volume 1	D Ream	-
O C T O B E R	18	Four-Calendar Café	Cocteau Twins	-
O C T O B E R	18	Heartwork	Carcass	-
O C T O B E R	18	I Love Mekons	The Mekons	-
O C T O B E R	18	It's a Jungle in Here	Medeski, Martin & Wood	-
O C T O B E R	18	Quique	Seefeel	Debut
O C T O B E R	18	A Real Dead One	Iron Maiden	Live
O C T O B E R	18	Together Alone	Crowded House	-
O C T O B E R	19	And the Weathermen Shrug Their Shoulders	The Ex	-
O C T O B E R	19	Counterparts	Rush	-
O C T O B E R	19	The Christmas Album	David Foster and Various Artists	Christmas
O C T O B E R	19	Electra 2000	Hum	-
O C T O B E R	19	Enta da Stage	Black Moon	Debut
O C T O B E R	19	Inhaler	Tad	-
O C T O B E R	19	It's On (Dr. Dre) 187um Killa	Eazy-E	-
O C T O B E R	19	Mexican Moon	Concrete Blonde	-
O C T O B E R	19	Morning Dove White	One Dove	-
O C T O B E R	19	No Pressure	Erick Sermon	-
O C T O B E R	19	Plantation Lullabies	Meshell Ndegeocello	-
O C T O B E R	19	Possum Dixon	Possum Dixon	Debut
O C T O B E R	19	Vs.	Pearl Jam	Official US release date. Released in Europe on 11 October
O C T O B E R	20	Excuses	Kim Gun-mo	-
O C T O B E R	20	Not for Kids Only	Jerry Garcia and David Grisman	-
O C T O B E R	21	Calling	Masaharu Fukuyama	-
O C T O B E R	21	Jidai: Time Goes Around	Miyuki Nakajima	-
O C T O B E R	21	Rashōmon	Ningen Isu	-
O C T O B E R	22	Fumbling Towards Ecstasy	Sarah McLachlan	Canada
O C T O B E R	25	Dark Medieval Times	Satyricon	-
O C T O B E R	25	My Tribute	Carola Häggkvist	-
O C T O B E R	25	Paris	The Cure	Live
O C T O B E R	25	Sound as Ever	You Am I	Debut
O C T O B E R	25	Tribute to the Music of Bob Wills and the Texas Playboys	Asleep at the Wheel	-
O C T O B E R	26	A Liturgy, a Legacy, & a Ragamuffin Band	Rich Mullins	-
O C T O B E R	26	Live MCMXCIII	The Velvet Underground	Live
O C T O B E R	26	Born to Choose	Various Artists	-
O C T O B E R	26	Five Dollar Bob's Mock Cooter Stew	Mudhoney	EP
O C T O B E R	26	I'm Alive	Jackson Browne	-
O C T O B E R	26	I'm Ready	Tevin Campbell	-
O C T O B E R	26	Insufficient Therapy	Craig Goldy	-
O C T O B E R	26	Get in Where You Fit In	Too Short	-
O C T O B E R	26	God Shuffled His Feet	Crash Test Dummies	-
O C T O B E R	26	MTV Unplugged	10,000 Maniacs	Live
O C T O B E R	26	No Alternative	Various Artists	AIDS Benefit
O C T O B E R	26	Pussy Whipped	Bikini Kill	-
O C T O B E R	26	Shaq Diesel	Shaquille O'Neal	Debut
O C T O B E R	26	Stillborn	Malevolent Creation	-
O C T O B E R	26	Symphonic Music of Yes	London Philharmonic Orchestra	cover songs of Yes
O C T O B E R	26	The Song Remembers When	Trisha Yearwood	-
O C T O B E R	26	Try Anything Once	Alan Parsons	-
O C T O B E R	26	Turner Nichols	Turner Nichols	-
O C T O B E R	26	When My Heart Finds Christmas	Harry Connick Jr.	Christmas
O C T O B E R	26	World Gone Wrong	Bob Dylan	-
O C T O B E R	27	My Home Town	Kazumasa Oda	-
O C T O B E R	27	Passione	Toshinori Yonekura	-
O C T O B E R	?	Dick's Picks Volume 1	Grateful Dead	Live
O C T O B E R	?	Timelord	Momus	-
N O V E M B E R	1	The Red Shoes	Kate Bush	-
N O V E M B E R	1	Full Moon, Dirty Hearts	INXS	-
N O V E M B E R	1	Espresso Logic	Chris Rea	-
N O V E M B E R	1	Amor Amarillo	Gustavo Cerati	-
N O V E M B E R	2	The Black Rider	Tom Waits	Soundtrack
N O V E M B E R	2	Croonin'	Anne Murray	-
N O V E M B E R	2	Duets	Frank Sinatra	-
N O V E M B E R	2	Even Cowgirls Get the Blues	k.d. lang	Soundtrack
N O V E M B E R	2	Find Your Way	Gabrielle	-
N O V E M B E R	2	First Christmas	BeBe & CeCe Winans	Christmas
N O V E M B E R	2	Jericho	The Band	-
N O V E M B E R	2	Shouldn't a Told You That	The Chicks	-
N O V E M B E R	2	So Far So Good	Bryan Adams	Compilation
N O V E M B E R	2	Susan Ashton	Susan Ashton	-
N O V E M B E R	2	The Yellow Shark	Frank Zappa	-
N O V E M B E R	2	You Can Be A Daddy, But Never Daddy-O	Daddy-O	-
N O V E M B E R	3	Angels Cry	Angra	-
N O V E M B E R	8	Both Sides	Phil Collins	-
N O V E M B E R	8	Paul Is Live	Paul McCartney	Live
N O V E M B E R	8	Live at Donington	Iron Maiden	Live
N O V E M B E R	8	The Singles Collection	David Bowie	Compilation
N O V E M B E R	8	The Buddha of Suburbia	David Bowie	TV soundtrack
N O V E M B E R	8	Freedom	Yothu Yindi	-
N O V E M B E R	8	So Natural	Lisa Stansfield	-
N O V E M B E R	8	End of Part One: Their Greatest Hits	Wet Wet Wet	-
N O V E M B E R	9	12 Play	R. Kelly	Debut
N O V E M B E R	9	The Colour of My Love	Celine Dion	North America
N O V E M B E R	9	Enter the Wu-Tang (36 Chambers)	Wu-Tang Clan	-
N O V E M B E R	9	II D Extreme	II D Extreme	-
N O V E M B E R	9	Intimacy	Jody Watley	-
N O V E M B E R	9	Love Tara	Eric's Trip	-
N O V E M B E R	9	Midnight Marauders	A Tribe Called Quest	-
N O V E M B E R	9	Poetenes Evangelium	Morten Harket	-
N O V E M B E R	9	Remember Two Things	The Dave Matthews Band	Independent release
N O V E M B E R	9	Stone Free: A Tribute to Jimi Hendrix	Various Artists	Jimi Hendrix tribute
N O V E M B E R	9	Swing Batta Swing	K7	-
N O V E M B E R	9	Wake-Up Call	Petra	-
N O V E M B E R	10	The Bis-Quits	The Bis-Quits	-
N O V E M B E R	10	Ivory II	Miki Imai	-
N O V E M B E R	11	Soli Deo Gloria	Apoptygma Berzerk	-
N O V E M B E R	11	Thy Mighty Contract	Rotting Christ	-
N O V E M B E R	12	Jim Witter	Jim Witter	-
N O V E M B E R	12	Kaddish	Towering Inferno	-
N O V E M B E R	13	Drawing Down the Moon	Beherit	-
N O V E M B E R	15	Drop Out	East Village	-
N O V E M B E R	15	Flashback	Joan Jett and the Blackhearts	Compilation
N O V E M B E R	15	Now That's What I Call Music! 26	Various Artists	Compilation
N O V E M B E R	15	On	Aphex Twin	EP
N O V E M B E R	15	Quasi	Quasi	Debut
N O V E M B E R	15	Sad but True	Tex, Don and Charlie	-
N O V E M B E R	15	The Spectral Sorrows	Edge of Sanity	-
N O V E M B E R	15	Strawberries Oceans Ships Forest	The Fireman	-
N O V E M B E R	16	Black Reign	Queen Latifah	-
N O V E M B E R	16	Deluxe	Better Than Ezra	Swell Records; re-issued on Elektra in 1995
N O V E M B E R	16	Desire Walks On	Heart	-
N O V E M B E R	16	Hand on the Torch	Us3	Debut
N O V E M B E R	16	More Love	Doug Stone	-
N O V E M B E R	16	The One Thing	Michael Bolton	-
N O V E M B E R	16	Romulus Hunt: A Family Opera	Carly Simon	-
N O V E M B E R	16	Shock of the Hour	MC Ren	-
N O V E M B E R	16	Stampede	Concussion Ensemble	-
N O V E M B E R	16	Straight Up Sewaside	Das EFX	-
N O V E M B E R	16	What You Hear Is What You Get	Bad Company	-
N O V E M B E R	17	Really Love Ya!!	Kenji Sawada	-
N O V E M B E R	22	Jump Back: The Best of The Rolling Stones	The Rolling Stones	Compilation
N O V E M B E R	22	Nightcap	Jethro Tull	UK; archive recordings
N O V E M B E R	22	Take as Needed for Pain	Eyehategod	-
N O V E M B E R	23	The Beavis and Butt-Head Experience	Various Artists	-
N O V E M B E R	23	Doggystyle	Snoop Doggy Dogg	-
N O V E M B E R	23	Duets	Elton John	-
N O V E M B E R	23	Gypsy	Bette Midler	Soundtrack
N O V E M B E R	23	Haddaway	Haddaway	US
N O V E M B E R	23	High-Tech Redneck	George Jones	-
N O V E M B E R	23	Live Shit: Binge & Purge	Metallica	Live Box
N O V E M B E R	23	No Need for Alarm	Del the Funky Homosapien	-
N O V E M B E R	23	Pale Sun, Crescent Moon	Cowboy Junkies	-
N O V E M B E R	23	The Sign	Ace of Base	North American/Japanese version of Happy Nation
N O V E M B E R	23	"The Spaghetti Incident?"	Guns N' Roses	Covers album
N O V E M B E R	23	Squint	Steve Taylor	-
N O V E M B E R	23	Winter Light	Linda Ronstadt	-
N O V E M B E R	29	Always & Forever	Eternal	Debut
N O V E M B E R	29	Incunabula	Autechre	
N O V E M B E R	29	Young Black Brotha	Mac Dre	-
N O V E M B E R	30	Ear to the Street	The Conscious Daughters	-
N O V E M B E R	30	Of Ruine or Some Blazing Starre	Current 93	-
N O V E M B E R	?	Kitchen	Sun Electric	-
N O V E M B E R	?	Dreams Never Die	Tiffany	-
N O V E M B E R	?	Montage	Kenny G	Compilation
D E C E M B E R	1	Acid Eaters	Ramones	-
D E C E M B E R	6	21st Century Jesus	Messiah	-
D E C E M B E R	6	The Cross of Changes	Enigma	-
D E C E M B E R	6	Girls Will Be Girls	Farmer's Daughter	Debut
D E C E M B E R	6	Songs of Faith and Devotion Live	Depeche Mode	Live
D E C E M B E R	7	Domino	Domino	Debut
D E C E M B E R	7	Lethal Injection	Ice Cube	-
D E C E M B E R	7	The Nocturnal Silence	Necrophobic	Debut
D E C E M B E R	7	Right Back at Cha	Shai	EP
D E C E M B E R	7	What's the 411? Remix	Mary J. Blige	Remix
D E C E M B E R	8	Charlie Hunter Trio	Charlie Hunter	-
D E C E M B E R	8	Eternal Faith	Takara	-
D E C E M B E R	9	Pop Smear	The Verve Pipe	-
D E C E M B E R	10	Nostalgia	Hideaki Tokunaga	-
D E C E M B E R	10	World of Noise	Everclear	-
D E C E M B E R	14	Beethoven's 2nd: Music from the Original Motion Picture Soundtrack	Ralph Edelman and Various Artists	Soundtrack
D E C E M B E R	14	Dance of December Souls	Katatonia	-
D E C E M B E R	14	Desensitized	Pitchshifter	-
D E C E M B E R	14	Wayne's World 2	Various Artists	Soundtrack
D E C E M B E R	20	Pigeonhed	Pigeonhed	-
D E C E M B E R	21	Diary of a Mad Band	Jodeci	-
D E C E M B E R	31	Little Cowpoke	Nickel Creek	-

=== Release date unknown ===
- Alice in Wonderland No. 5 – Randy Greif
- Amon: Feasting the Beast – Deicide
- Attitude – April Wine
- Belgium...One Point – Telex
- Beyond These Shores – Iona
- Bridges to Bert – Leftover Salmon
- The Bride – Crystal Lewis
- Bring It Down – Madder Rose
- Classics – Model 500
- Chronologie – Jean Michel Jarre
- Code of Ethics – Code of Ethics
- Demoluca – Pezz (Billy Talent)
- !!Destroy-Oh-Boy!! – New Bomb Turks
- Drag – Red Aunts
- The Downward Road – The Pursuit of Happiness
- Dragonfly Summer – Michael Franks
- Evolution – Geoff Moore
- Fathom – Mortal
- ...fluidtrance centauri... – The Ecstasy of Saint Theresa
- Footsoldier in the Moonlight – Donnie Iris
- Four – Seaweed
- From the Vaults – Nazareth
- G-Stoned – Kruder & Dorfmeister
- The Gods of Earth and Heaven – Army of Lovers
- Golden Feelings – Beck
- Goldie's Last Day – PFR
- Great Big Sea – Great Big Sea
- Heartbeat – Hank Marvin
- Heat it Up – DeGarmo and Key
- Highlands – White Heart
- Into the Son – Dakoda Motor Co.
- Is It ... Man or Astroman? – Man or Astro-man?
- It Is the Business of the Future to Be Dangerous – Hawkwind
- Jackpot Plus! – Jawbox
- Jericho – Prism
- Jonah's Ark – Skyclad
- Kings & Queens – Sham 69
- Little Red Riding Hood – Lost Dogs
- Live at the Royal Albert Hall – Emerson, Lake & Palmer
- Live in Leipzig – Mayhem
- Love Makes No Sense – Alexander O'Neal
- Lucky Jim – The Gun Club
- Mindsize – Poor Old Lu
- Mr. Mention – Buju Banton
- MotorCycle – Daniel Amos
- The Muffs – The Muffs
- Near Death Experience – Cro-Mags
- Original Dubliners – The Dubliners
- Our Bodies Our Selves – The Mr. T Experience
- Out the Shizzy – 7 Seconds
- Piss – Slank
- Post Momentary Affliction – Mortification
- Purge & Slouch – Giant Sand
- Quetzacoatl – J Church
- Reach of Love – Rez Band
- Reason Street – Carolyne Mas
- Reasons – Al Denson
- Redeemed Hoodlum – T-Bone (rapper)
- Saviour Machine I – Saviour Machine
- The Serpentine Similar – Gastr del Sol
- Shawl – The Prayer Chain
- Shiva Space Machine – Me Mom and Morgentaler
- Sing Me a Song – Miriam Makeba
- Southpaw – Precious Death
- Space Is the Place – Sun Ra
- The Standard – Carman
- Strange Cargo III - William Orbit
- Super Tasty – Gumball
- Take the Leap! – Toyah
- Tamplin – Ken Tamplin
- This Should Not Be – Bo Diddley
- Vampire on Titus – Guided by Voices
- Volume 2 – Die Happy (band)
- Wallflower – My Sister's Machine
- The Wind and the Wave – Billy Sprague

== Biggest hit singles ==
The following songs achieved the highest chart positions in the charts of 1993.

#	Artist	Title	Year	Country	Chart entries
1	Meat Loaf	I'd Do Anything For Love (But I Won't Do That)	1993	(United States)	UK 1 – Oct 1993, US BB 1 of 1993, The Netherlands 1 – Oct 1993, Austria 1 – Nov 1993, Switzerland 1 – Nov 1993, Norway 1 – Oct 1993, Germany 1 – Jan 1994, Republic of Ireland 1 – Oct 1993, New Zealand 1 for 5 weeks Sep 1993, Australia 1 for 8 weeks Dec 1993, Sweden 2 – Oct 1993, Poland 5 – Nov 1993, Australia 5 of 1993, France 10 – Sep 1993, US BB 15 of 1993, Europe 20 of the 1990s, Germany 28 of the 1990s, US CashBox 32 of 1994, POP 34 of 1993, Belgium 210 of all time, OzNet 375
2	UB40	I Can't Help Falling in Love With You	1993	(United Kingdom)	UK 1 – May 1993, US BB 1 of 1993, US CashBox 1 of 1993, The Netherlands 1 – May 1993, Sweden 1 – Jun 1993, Austria 1 – Jul 1993, New Zealand 1 for 11 weeks Jun 1993, Australia 1 for 7 weeks Oct 1993, Switzerland 2 – Jun 1993, Germany 2 – Jun 1993, Australia 3 of 1993, Norway 4 – Jun 1993, US BB 6 of 1993, POP 6 of 1993, France 10 – May 1993, Poland 12 – Aug 1993, Scrobulate 48 of reggae, Germany 85 of the 1990s, Italy 88 of 1993, OzNet 836
3	4 Non Blondes	What's Up?	1993	(United States)	The Netherlands 1 – Jul 1993, Sweden 1 – Aug 1993, Austria 1 – Aug 1993, Switzerland 1 – Jul 1993, Norway 1 – Jul 1993, Poland 1 – Jul 1993, Germany 1 – Jul 1993, Republic of Ireland 1 – Jul 1993, UK 2 – Jun 1993, Italy 8 of 1993, Australia 10 of 1993, US BB 14 of 1993, Germany 17 of the 1990s, US BB 31 of 1993, Scrobulate 46 of 90s, US CashBox 50 of 1993, RYM 61 of 1993, Europe 62 of the 1990s, POP 67 of 1993, Belgium 209 of all time
4	Snow	Informer	1992	(Canada)	US BB 1 of 1993, Sweden 1 – Mar 1993, Switzerland 1 – Apr 1993, Norway 1 – Apr 1993, Germany 1 – Apr 1993, Republic of Ireland 1 – Apr 1993, New Zealand 1 for 3 weeks May 1993, Australia 1 for 5 weeks Sep 1993, UK 2 – Mar 1993, The Netherlands 2 – Mar 1993, Austria 3 – May 1993, Australia 6 of 1993, US CashBox 9 of 1993, US BB 13 of 1993, POP 51 of 1993, Germany 52 of the 1990s, Italy 68 of 1993
5	Haddaway	What is Love?	1993	(Trinidad and Tobago)	US BB 1 of 1993, The Netherlands 1 – Apr 1993, France 1 – Apr 1993, Austria 1 – May 1993, Switzerland 1 – Apr 1993, Norway 1 – Apr 1993, Republic of Ireland 1 – Jul 1993, POP 1 of 1993, UK 2 – Jun 1993, Sweden 2 – Mar 1993, Germany 2 – Mar 1993, Scrobulate 4 of 90s, Italy 5 of 1993, Germany 10 of the 1990s, US BB 11 of 1993, RYM 154 of 1993

== Top 40 Chart hit singles ==
Song title	Artist(s)	Release date(s)	US	UK	Highest chart position	Other Chart Performance(s)
"7"	Prince	January 1993	7	27	7 (United States)	See chart performance entry (1992 overlap)
"Again"	Janet Jackson	October 1993	1	6	1 (United States)	See chart performance entry
"Ain't It Fun"	Guns N' Roses	November 1993	n/a	9	2 (Portugal)	See chart performance entry
"Alison (C'est ma copine à moi)"	Jordy	February 1993	n/a	n/a	1 (Belgium [Ultratop 50 Wallonia], France)	6 (Finland) - 13 (Europe) - 22 (Belgium [Ultratop 50 Flanders])
"All for Love"	Bryan Adams, Rod Stewart & Sting	November 1993	1	2	1 (13 countries)	See chart performance entry
"Almost Unreal"	Roxette	May 1993	94	7	5 (Ireland)	See chart performance entry
"Alright"	Kris Kross & Super Cat	July 1993	19	47	1 (Portugal)	See chart performance entry
"Amazing"	Aerosmith	November 1993	24	58	2 (Iceland)	See chart performance entry
"Angel"	Jon Secada	January 1993	18	23	4 (Canada)	See chart performance entry
"Animal Nitrate"	Suede	February 1993	n/a	7	7 (United Kingdom)	11 (Ireland, New Zealand) - 21 (Sweden) - 23 (Europe) - 89 (Australia)
"Anniversary"	Tony! Toni! Toné!	September 1993	10	n/a	10 (United States)	2 (U.S. Billboard Hot R&B/Hip-Hop Songs) - 16 (New Zealand) - 20 (U.S. Billboard Mainstream Top 40) - 44 (Canada) - 70 (Australia)
"Another Sad Love Song"	Toni Braxton	June 1993	7	15	2 (Zimbabwe)	See chart performance entry
"Anything"	Culture Beat	December 1993	n/a	5	3 (Austria, Ireland, Israel)	See chart performance entry
"Are You Gonna Go My Way"	Lenny Kravitz	February 1993	n/a	4	1 (Australia)	See chart performance entry

=== Other Chart hit singles ===
- "Babe" – Take That (#1 UK, IRL)
- "Bad Boys" (theme from Cops) – Inner Circle (#1 FIN, NOR, #2 SWE, #8 US)
- "Bad Girl" – Madonna (#3 IT, #10 UK)
- "Bed of Roses" – Bon Jovi (#9 NLD, SWI, #10 US, AUS)
- "Believe" – Lenny Kravitz
- "Big Gun" – AC/DC (#5 SWI, #8 NOR)
- "Bombtrack" – Rage Against the Machine
- "Boom Shack-A-Lak" – Apache Indian (#5 UK)
- "Boom! Shake the Room" – DJ Jazzy Jeff & the Fresh Prince (#1 AUS, IRL, SP, UK)
- "Both Sides of the Story" – Phil Collins (#2 CAN, #3 IT, #7 BE, UK)
- "Break It Down Again" – Tears for Fears (#4 CAN, #7 IT)
- "Breathe Again" – Toni Braxton (#2 AUS, NZ, UK, #3 US)
- "Bye Bye Baby" – Madonna (#7 IT)
- "Ça plane pour moi" – leila K
- "Can You forgive Her?" – Pet Shop Boys (#2 FIN, FR, #7 UK)
- "Can't Get Enough of Your Love, Babe" – Taylor Dayne (#2 AUS, #6 JAP)
- "Can't Help Falling in Love" – UB40
- "Cantaloop (Flip Fantasia)" – Us3 (#9 US)
- "Cat's in the Cradle" – Ugly Kid Joe (#1 AUS, #2 NOR, #4 NZ, SWE)
- "Cherub Rock" – Smashing Pumpkins
- "Come Baby Come" – K7 (#3 IRL, UK)
- "Come Undone" – Duran Duran (#1 ISR, #2 CAN, #6 IT, #7 US)
- "Condemnation" – Depeche Mode (#3 SWE, #5 FIN, #9 SP, UK)
- "Cose della vita" – Eros Ramazzotti (#1 BE, #3 SP, #4 IT)
- "Creep" – Radiohead (#3 NOR, #6 AUS, #7 UK)
- "Cryin'" – Aerosmith (#1 NOR, POL, #3 SWE)
- "The Crying Game" – Boy George (#1 CAN, #15 US)
- "Darla dirladada" – G.O. Culture (#1 FR)
- "Deep" – East 17 (#5 UK, JAP, #6 SWE, #7 AUS, IRL)
- "Deeper and Deeper" – Madonna (#1 ITA, #2 CAN, #6 UK, IRE, #7 US)
- "Do You See the Light (Looking For)" – Snap! (#1 FIN, #4 BE, #8 AUT, #9 IRL, NLD)
- "Dogs of Lust" – The The
- "Don't Look Any Further" - M People
- "Don't Walk Away" – Jade (#4 US, #7 UK)
- "Dre Day" – Dr. Dre & Snoop Doggy Dogg (#8 US)
- "Dreamlover" – Mariah Carey (#1 US, CAN)
- "Dreams" – Gabrielle (#1 UK, #2 AUS, IRL, #5 IT, SWE)
- "Dum Da Dum" – Melodie MC
- "Easy" – Faith No More (#1 AUS, #2 NOR, #3 BE, FIN, UK)
- "Everybody Hurts" – R.E.M. (#3 FR, #6 AUS, IRL, #7 UK)
- "Exterminate!" – Snap! (#1 FIN, SP, #2 IRL, SWI, UK)
- "Faces" – 2 Unlimited (#2 NLD, #3 BE, #4 SP)
- "Feels Like Heaven" – Urban Cookie Collective (#5 UK, #10 AUS)
- "Fever" – Madonna (#1 FIN, #6 IRL, UK)
- "For Whom the Bell Tolls" – Bee Gees (#1 BRA, #4 UK, #6 IRL)
- "Freak Me" – Silk (#1 US, #3 AUS)
- "Funky Child" – Lords of the Underground
- "Gangsta Lean" – DRS (#1 NZ, #4 US)
- "Get-A-Way" – Maxx (#3 AUT, NLD, SWE, #4 DEN, UK)
- "Getto Jam" – Domino
- "Girl I've Been Hurt" – Snow
- "Girl U For Me" – Silk
- "Give In to Me" – Michael Jackson & Slash
- "Give It Up" – Cut 'N' Move
- "Go on Move" – Reel 2 Real
- "Go West" – Pet Shop Boys
- "Got to Get It" – Culture Beat
- "Hat 2 da Back" – TLC
- "Have I Told You Lately" – Rod Stewart
- "Heart-Shaped Box" – Nirvana
- "Here We Go" - Stakka Bo
- "Hero" – Mariah Carey
- "Hey Mr. D.J." – Zhané (#6 US, #9 AUS)
- "Higher Ground" – UB40 (#8 UK, NLD, NZ)
- "Hip Hop Hooray" – Naughty by Nature (#6 NZ, #8 US)
- "Holler If Ya Hear Me" – 2Pac
- "Hope of Deliverance" – Paul McCartney (#1 SP, #3 GER, #4 AUT, NOR)
- "Human Behaviour" – Bjork
- "I Don't Wanna Fight" – Tina Turner (#1 CAN, #7 NZ, #8 BE, IT, NOR)
- "I Feel You" – Depeche Mode
- "I Get Around" – 2Pac (#3 USA, #8 UK)
- "I Have Nothing" – Whitney Houston (#1 US, CAN, UK)
- "I Will Always Love You" – Whitney Houston (#1 US, AUS, NZ, UK)
- "I Will Survive (Phil Kelsey remix)" - Gloria Gaynor
- "I'd Do Anything For Love (But I Won't Do That)" – Meat Loaf
- "I'll Never Get Over You Getting Over Me" – Exposé (#8 US)
- "I'll Sleep When I'm Dead" – Bon Jovi
- "I'm Every Woman" – Whitney Houston
- "I'm Gonna Be (500 Miles)" – The Proclaimers
- "I'm So Into You" – SWV
- "I'm the Only One" – Melissa Etheridge (#1 Adult Contemporary, #4 Pop Airplay #8 Hot 100)
- "If" – Janet Jackson
- "If I Can't Have You" – Kim Wilde
- "If I Ever Lose My Faith in You" – Sting (#17 US)
- "If I Had No Loot" – Tony! Toni! Toné!
- "In All the Right Places" - Lisa Stansfield
- "In These Arms" – Bon Jovi
- "Informer" – Snow
- "Is It Love" – Twenty 4 Seven
- "It Keeps Rainin'" – Bitty McLean (UK #2)
- "It Was a Good Day" – Ice Cube
- "I've Got You Under My Skin" – Frank Sinatra & Bono
- "Jessie" – Joshua Kadison (#6 AUT, NLD, #9 DEN)
- "Just Kickin' It" – Xscape (#2 US)
- "Keep on Dancing" – DJ BoBo (#1 FIN, #2 SWI, #5 GER)
- "Keep Ya Head Up" – 2Pac (#8 USA, #11 UK)
- "The Key The Secret" – Urban Cookie Collective (#2 UK)
- "La solitudine" – Laura Pausini (#1 BE, IT, NLD)
- "L'Autre Finistère" – Les Innocents (#10 FR)
- "Life" – Haddaway (#1 FIN, SP, SWE)
- "Linger" – The Cranberries (#3 IRL, #4 CAN)
- "Little Bird" - Annie Lennox
- "Living on My Own" – Freddie Mercury (#1 UK, FR)
- "Looking Through Patient Eyes" – P.M. Dawn (#1 CAN, #6 US)
- "Love Can Move Mountains" – Celine Dion (#2 CAN)
- "The Love I Lost" - West End & Sybil
- "Love Is" – Vanessa Williams & Brian McKnight (#3 US)
- "Love Sees No Colour" – U96 (#3 AUT, #4 FIN, SWE, SWI, #5 SP)
- "Love Song for a Vampire" – Annie Lennox (#3 UK, IRL)
- "Low" – Cracker
- "Luv 4 Luv" – Robin S. (#4 NLD, #5 BE)
- "Man on the Moon" – R.E.M. (#4 CAN)
- "Mary Jane's Last Dance" – Tom Petty and the Heartbreakers (#5 CAN)
- "Maximum Overdrive" – 2 Unlimited (#1 FIN, SP, #4 BE, #5 NLD)
- "Mets de l'huile" – Regg'Lyss (#1 FR)
- "More and More" – Captain Hollywood Project (#1 GER, #2 BE, #3 AUT, NOR, SWE, SWI)
- "Moving On Up" – M People (#2 UK, #3 FR, #4 AUT, IRL, NZ)
- "Mr. Jones" – Counting Crows (#1 CAN, #7 FR)
- "Mr. Vain" – Culture Beat (#1 AUS, AUT, BE, FIN, GER, IRL, IT, NLD, NOR, SWI, UK)
- "My Sister" – Juliana Hatfield
- "Night in Motion" – U96 (#7 AUT, FIN, #9 GER)
- "No Limit" – 2 Unlimited (#1 AUT, BE, FIN, FR, IRL, NLD, NOR, SP, SWE, SWI, UK)
- "No Rain" – Blind Melon (#1 CAN, #8 AUS)
- "Nuthin' but a 'G' Thang" – Dr. Dre & Snoop Doggy Dogg (#2 US)
- "Oh Carolina" – Shaggy (#1 UK, IRL, #2 AUT, NZ)
- "One Night in Heaven" – M People (#6 UK)
- "Only with You" – Captain Hollywood Project (#2 FIN, #3 BE, SP, #4 GER)
- "Open Sesame" – Leila K (#1 BE, #2 NLD, #3 IT)
- "Ordinary World" – Duran Duran (#1 CAN, #2 IT, #3 IRL, US)
- "The Perfect Year" - Dina Carroll
- "Piece of My Heart" - Intermission
- "Pinocchio" - Pin-Occhio
- "Please Forgive Me" – Bryan Adams (#1 CAN, AUS, BE, IRL, NOR)
- "Plush" – Stone Temple Pilots
- "Power of American Natives" – Dance 2 Trance & Linda Rocco (#3 NDL, FIN, #5 NOR)
- "The Power of Love" – Celine Dion (#1 CAN, AUS, US)
- "Pray" – Take That (#1 UK, #2 IRL, ISR)
- "The Promise Man" – Basic Element
- "Queen of the Night" – Whitney Houston
- "Rain" – Madonna (#2 CAN, JAP, #5 AUS, #7 UK, IRE, #9 ITA)
- "The Red Strokes" – Garth Brooks (#7 IRL)
- "Regret" – New Order (#4 UK, #5 URL)
- "Relax '93" - Frankie Goes to Hollywood
- "Relight My Fire" – Take That & Lulu (#1 UK, ISR)
- "The Rhythm of the Night" – Corona (#1 IT, #2 UK, #3 IRL, SP)
- "Right Here/Human Nature" – SWV (#3 UK, #7 NZ)
- "The River of Dreams" – Billy Joel (#1 AUS, NZ, #2 AUT, CAN, IRL, SWI)
- "Rooster" – Alice in Chains
- "Rubberband Girl" – Kate Bush
- "Run to You" – Whitney Houston
- "Runaway Train" – Soul Asylum (#1 CAN, #2 NZ, NOR, SWE, SWI)
- "Sad but True" – Metallica
- "Said I Loved You...But I Lied" – Michael Bolton (#2 AUS, #3 CAN, #6 US)
- "Salta" – King África (ARG)
- "Schrei nach Liebe" – Die Ärzte
- "She Don't Let Nobody" – Chaka Demus & Pliers (#4 UK, #9 IRL)
- "Shoop" – Salt-N-Pepa (#2 AUS, #5 US)
- "Shout" – Louchie Lou & Michie One (UK #7)
- "Show Me Love" – Robin S. (#5 US)
- "The Sign" – Ace of Base (#1 AUS, CAN, FIN, GER, NZ, SP, US)
- "Sing Hallelujah!" – Dr. Alban (#2 BE, FIN, #4 GER, SWI)
- "Slam" – Onyx (#4 US)
- "Slave to the Music" – Twenty 4 Seven (#2 AUS, #4 SWE, #5 NOR)
- "Sleeping Satellite" – Tasmin Archer (#1 UK, IRL, #4 SWE, #5 SWI)
- "Sober" – Tool
- "Somebody Dance with Me" – DJ BoBo (#1 SWE, SWI, #3 AUT, NOR)
- "Somebody to Love" (live) – Queen & George Michael (#1 UK, IRL, #6 NLD, #8 NZ)
- "Soul to Squeeze" – Red Hot Chili Peppers (#6 NZ, #9 AUS)
- "Stay (Faraway, So Close!)" – U2 (#1 IRL, #4 UK, #5 AUS, FIN)
- "Steam" – Peter Gabriel (#10 UK)
- "Sweat" – U.S.U.R.A. (#4 IT, #9 AUT)
- "Sweet Harmony" – The Beloved (#3 AUT, #6 GER, SWI, #8 UK)
- "Sweet Thing" – Mick Jagger (#7 AUT, #8 FR, SWI, #9 NOR)
- "Tease Me" – Chaka Demus & Pliers (#3 UK, #5 AUS, NLD)
- "That's the Way Love Goes" – Janet Jackson (#1 US, AUS, FR, HUN, NZ)
- "The Morning Papers" – Prince
- "Three Little Pigs" – Green Jellÿ (#5 UK, #6 AUS)
- "Tribal Dance" – 2 Unlimited (#1 FIN, SP, #2 GER, IRL, SWE)
- "True Love" – Elton John & Kiki Dee (#2 UK)
- "Trust Me" – Pandora (#2 FIN, #3 SWE, #8 NOR)
- "Two Princes" – Spin Doctors (#1 SWE, #2 CAN, NLD, NOR)
- "U Got 2 Let the Music" – Cappella (#1 AUT, FIN, SWI)
- "Walking in My Shoes" – Depeche Mode (#3 FIN, #6 SP, #8 SWE)
- "We Are Family" (remix) - Sister Sledge
- "Weak" – SWV (#6 US)
- "West End Girls" - East 17
- "What Is Love" – Haddaway
- "What's up?" – 4 Non Blondes
- "Wheel of Fortune" – Ace of Base (#1 NOR, #2 DEN, #4 GER)
- "Whoomp! (There It Is)" – Tag Team (#2 US, #6 NLD)
- "Why Can't I Wake Up with You" – Take That (#2 UK, #7 IRL)
- "Wild World" – Mr. Big (#7 SWI, #9 CAN, #10 SWE)
- "Will You Be There" – Michael Jackson
- "Wir zwei allein" – David Hasselhoff & Gwen
- "Young at Heart" - The Bluebells

== Notable singles ==
Song title	Artist(s)	Release date(s)	Other Chart Performance(s)
"50ft Queenie"	PJ Harvey	April 1993	27 (UK Singles Chart) - 179 (Australia)
"All Apologies"	Nirvana	December 1993	See chart performance entry
"Animal Nitrate"	Suede	February 1993	See chart performance entry
"Cannonball"	The Breeders	August 1993	See chart performance entry
"Chemical World"	Blur	June 1993	27 (U.S. Billboard Alternative Airplay) - 28 (UK Singles Chart)
"Feed the Tree"	Belly	January 1993	1 (U.S. Billboard Alternative Airplay) - 32 (UK Singles Chart) - 95 (U.S. Billboard Hot 100)
"From Despair to Where"	Manic Street Preachers	June 1993	25 (UK Singles Chart)
"For Tomorrow"	Blur	April 1993	28 (UK Singles Chart) - 119 (Australia)
"Heart-Shaped Box"	Nirvana	August 1993	See chart performance entry
"Jenny Ondioline"	Stereolab	December 1993	75 (UK Singles Chart)
"Linger"	The Cranberries	February 1993	See chart performance entry
"Regret"	New Order	April 1993	See chart performance entry
"Start Choppin"	Dinosaur Jr.	January 1993	3 (U.S. Billboard Alternative Airplay) - 20 (Ireland, United Kingdom) - 40 (Sweden)

=== Other Notable singles ===
- "Adam's Ribs" - You Am I
- "Blue Tears" - Judy and Mary
- "Brian Wilson" - Barenaked Ladies
- "Dixie Drug Store" - Grant Lee Buffalo
- "Happy Birthday Helen" - Things of Stone and Wood
- "Your Eyes" - Underground Lovers

== Top 10 selling albums of the year ==
1. The Bodyguard: Original Soundtrack Album – Whitney Houston
2. Breathless – Kenny G
3. Unplugged - Eric Clapton
4. janet. – Janet Jackson
5. Some Gave All – Billy Ray Cyrus
6. The Chronic – Dr. Dre
7. Pocket Full Of Kryptonite – Spin Doctors
8. Ten – Pearl Jam
9. The Chase – Garth Brooks
10. Core – Stone Temple Pilots

== Top 10 best albums of the Year ==
All albums have been named albums of the year for their hits in the charts.

1. Nirvana – In Utero
2. The Smashing Pumpkins – Siamese Dream
3. Wu-Tang Clan – Enter the Wu-Tang (36 Chambers)
4. Pearl Jam – Vs.
5. Counting Crows – August and Everything After
6. Björk – Debut
7. Blur – Modern Life is Rubbish
8. Liz Phair – Exile in Guyville
9. Suede – Suede
10. Slowdive – Souvlaki

== Classical music ==
- John Adams – Violin Concerto
- Mounir Anastas – Né du néant for alto saxophone & fixed media
- Luciano Berio – Rage and Outrage
- Pierre Boulez – ...explosante-fixe... (fourth version)
- Alvin Curran – VSTO (string quartet)
- Michael Daugherty – Bizarro
- Mario Davidovsky – Shulamit's Dream for soprano and orchestra
- David Diamond – Symphony No. 11
- Joël-François Durand – Concerto for Piano and Orchestra
- Ivan Fedele – Piano Concerto
- Lorenzo Ferrero
  - Introito (from "Requiem per le vittime della mafia")
  - Maschere (incidental music)
- Philip Glass – In the Summer House, incidental music
- Vinko Globokar – Discours IX, for two pianos
- Klaus Huber – Winter Seeds, for accordion
- Houtaf Khoury
  - Concerto No. 1, for viola and orchestra
  - Intermezzo, for large orchestra
  - Sonate-Poème, for violin and piano
  - String Quartet No. 2
  - Cantata, for baritone and large orchestra
  - Piece, for piano
- Frederik Magle – Symphony for organ No. 2, Let There Be Light
- Krzysztof Penderecki – Polish Requiem (revised version)
- R. Murray Schafer – Concerto for Accordion and Orchestra
- Harold Schiffmann – Sestetto concertato
- Alfred Schnittke
  - Symphony No. 7
  - Concerto Grosso No. 6 for piano, violin and string orchestra
  - Peer Gynt: Epiloque, for violoncello, piano and tape
  - Improvisation, for solo cello
- Karlheinz Stockhausen – Helikopter-Streichquartett
- Bent Sørensen – Sterbende Gärten for violin and orchestra
- Takashi Yoshimatsu – Concerto for Trombone, Op. 55, Orion Machine

== Opera ==
- Daron Hagen – Shining Brow
- Theo Loevendie – Gassir, the Hero
- Michael Nyman – Noises, Sounds & Sweet Airs
- Randolph Peters – Nosferatu
- Steve Reich – The Cave
- Alfred Schnittke – Gesualdo
- Karlheinz Stockhausen – Dienstag aus Licht (May 28, Leipzig Opera)
- Hugo Weisgall – Esther (October, New York City Opera)

== Musical theater ==
- Annie Warbucks—off-Broadway production
- Blood Brothers (Willy Russell) – Broadway production opened at the Music Box Theatre and ran for 840 performances
- Cyrano: The Musical—Broadway production opened at the Neil Simon Theatre and ran for 137 performances
- The Goodbye Girl—Broadway production opened at the Marquis Theatre and ran for 188 performances
- Joseph and the Amazing Technicolor Dreamcoat—Broadway revival
- Kiss of the Spider Woman—Broadway production opened at the Broadhurst Theatre and ran for 904 performances
- My Fair Lady (Lerner & Loewe) – Broadway revival
- She Loves Me—Broadway revival

== Musical films ==
- CB4 (United States)
- Funes, a Great Love (Funes, un gran amor) (Argentina)
- Gypsy, starring Bette Midler (United States)
- Half Japanese: The Band That Would Be King
- Just Friends (Belgium/Netherlands)
- Lotrando a Zubejda (Czech Republic)
- Swing Kids
- The Line, the Cross and the Curve (UK)
- What's Love Got to Do with It (United States)
- Zero Patience (Canada)

== Births ==
- January 2 – Bryson Tiller, American singer-songwriter
- January 4
  - Manu Gavassi, Brazilian singer
  - Kojey Radical, British musician, creative director and mixed media visual artist. (His style has been described as a mix of grime hip hop, alternative rap, and spoken word.)
- January 5 – Suki Waterhouse, English singer-songwriter, actress, businesswoman and model
- January 7 – Nico Santos, German singer-songwriter
- January 8 – Anatii, South African rapper, singer, songwriter and record producer
- January 9 – Take A Daytrip's Denzel Baptiste, American record producer and songwriter
- January 10 – Rauw Alejandro, Puerto Rican singer, songwriter and actor (Engaged to Rosalía)
- January 12
  - Zayn Malik, British R&B singer-songwriter, rapper and former member of the band (One Direction)
  - D.O., Korean singer and actor (EXO)
  - Aika Mitsui, Japanese singer (Morning Musume)
- January 13 – Sachika Misawa, Japanese voice actress and singer
- January 14 – Molly Tuttle, an American vocalist, songwriter, banjo player and guitarist, recording artist, activist and teacher in the bluegrass tradition
- January 18 – Spensha Baker, American singer
- January 20 – Cat Janice, American singer-songwriter and activist (D. 2024)
- January 22 – Netta Barzilai, Israeli singer-songwriter and musician
- January 30
  - Cautious Clay, American singer-songwriter and record producer
  - Sebastián Silva, Colombian internet personality, vlogger, actor, presenter and singer
- February 6 – Tinashe, American singer-songwriter, dancer, performer and actress (The Stunners)
- February 14 – Shane Harper, American actor and singer (worked with Miranda Cosgrove and Bridgit Mendler)
- February 19 – Victoria Justice, American singer-songwriter and actress
- February 21 – Masaki Suda, Japanese actor and singer
- February 22 – Take a Daytrip's David Biral, American record producer and songwriter
- February 28 – Emmelie de Forest, Danish-Swedish singer and songwriter
- March 4 – Bobbi Kristina Brown, American singer (d. 2015)
- March 9 – Suga, South Korean rapper, songwriter, record producer, and member of BTS
- March 15 – Alyssa Reid, Canadian singer-songwriter
- March 23
  - Eddy Chen, member of violin duo TwoSet Violin
  - JP Saxe, Canadian singer and songwriter, collaborator with Julia Michaels
- March 30 – Anitta, Brazilian singer, songwriter, actress, dancer and record producer
- April 2 – Aaron Kelly, American singer
- April 10 – Sofia Carson, American singer and actress
- April 14
  - Graham Phillips, actor and singer
  - Ellington Ratliff, drummer and actor
  - Rozes, American musician, singer and songwriter
  - Burnell Taylor, American singer
  - Abhi the Nomad, Indian rapper
- April 15 – Del Water Gap, Indie American musician and record producer
- April 16 – Chance the Rapper, independent American Christian rapper
- April 18 – Nathan Sykes, English singer, songwriter and record producer, former member of The Wanted
- April 23 – Oklou, French musician
- April 25
  - Shiloh, Canadian singer
  - Ashe, American singer-songwriter and musician
- May 1 – Victoria Monet, American singer-songwriter and musician
- May 2 – Isyana Sarasvati, Indonesian singer and songwriter
- May 4 – Shygirl, an English rapper, DJ, singer, songwriter and co-head/founder of record label and collective Nuxxe
- May 6
  - Alex Preston, American singer
  - Naomi Scott, English actress and singer
- May 11 – James Reid, Filipino singer-actor
- May 13
  - Debby Ryan, American singer and actress
  - Tones and I, Australian singer-songwriter
- May 14 – Miranda Cosgrove, American singer and actress
- May 16 – IU, Korean singer-songwriter and actress
- May 17
  - GoldLink, American rapper
  - Iwamoto Hikaru, Japanese singer (Snow Man)
- May 18
  - Kyle, American rapper, singer and songwriter
  - Alekseev, Ukrainian singer
- June 6
  - Vic Mensa, American rapper (Kids These Days)
  - Tom Swoon, Polish DJ and producer
- June 7
  - George Ezra, English singer-songwriter and musician
  - Swae Lee, American rapper and singer
- June 9 – Ian Chan, Hong Kong singer (MIRROR)
- June 19 – KSI, English rapper and YouTuber
- June 25 – Piero Vergara, Filipino singer-songwriter and actor
- June 26 – Ariana Grande, American singer-songwriter, actress, performer, musician and advocate
- June 27 – Rejjie Snow, an Irish hip hop recording artist and record producer
- July 2
  - Saweetie, American rapper, singer and songwriter
  - Ieva Zasimauskaitė, Lithuanian singer
- July 3 – Vince Staples, American rapper and actor (Billie Eilish)
- July 5 – Hollie Cavanagh, English-American singer
- July 6 – Melissa Steel, British singer
- July 7
  - Ally Brooke, American singer, dancer and songwriter, member of Fifth Harmony
  - Vintage Culture, Brazilian DJ and Producer
  - Capital Steez, American rapper (Pro Era) (d. 2012)
- July 8 – Alice Ivy, Australian Electric Dance artist and producer
- July 10 – Perrie Edwards, English singer-songwriter, dancer and member of Little Mix, Businesswoman
- July 17 – Kali Uchis, Colombian-American singer, songwriter, poet, record producer, music video director, and fashion designer
- July 18
  - Lee Taemin, Korean singer (SHINee)
  - Casey Veggies, American rapper and songwriter
- July 19 – Fred Again, British record producer, singer, songwriter, multi-instrumentalist, and DJ.
- July 26
  - Elizabeth Gillies, American actress and singer
  - Taylor Momsen, American rock singer-songwriter, musician, record producer, former actress and model (The Pretty Reckless)
  - Stormzy, English grime and hip hop artist
- July 28
  - Cher Lloyd, British rapper, singer-songwriter
  - La'Porsha Renae, American singer-songwriter and American Idol alumni
- July 30 – Yohani, Sri Lankan singer, songwriter, rapper and music producer
- August 6 – Yaeji, Korean-American multilingual musician and music producer
- August 7 – Francesca Eastwood, American actress, socialite and television personality
- August 9 – Sampa the Great, a Zambian singer, rapper and songwriter.
- August 11 – Alyson Stoner, American dancer, singer, actor, YouTuber and model
- August 17 – Mauricio Alberto "Mau" Reglero Rodríguez, member of Mau y Ricky and sons of Argentine-Venezuelan singer Ricardo Montaner
- August 20 – MK Nobilette, American singer
- August 23 – Keke Palmer, American actress, singer, songwriter and presenter
- August 29 – Liam Payne, British singer of the band One Direction (d. 2024)
- September 1 – Megan Nicole, American singer-songwriter and YouTuber
- September 3 – Tantu Beats, Dutch record producer and DJ
- September 4 – Mark Vincent, Australian tenor
- September 7 – Mohamed Ali, Danish singer
- September 10 – Buddy, American rapper, singer, dancer and actor
- September 13
  - Niall Horan, Irish singer, songwriter and musician (One Direction)
  - Alice Merton, German-Canadian-English singer and songwriter
- September 16
  - Metro Boomin, American record producer
  - Tayla Parx, American RNB songwriter and producer
- September 18
  - Manal, Moroccan singer
  - Zozibini Tunzi, South African model and beauty queen
- September 24
  - Ben Platt, American singer-songwriter and actor
  - Alina Baraz, American RNB soul singer-songwriter
- September 25 – Rosalía, Spanish singer and songwriter
- October 4 – Mina, German singer
- October 8 – Saucy Santana, American rapper and make up artist
- October 9 – Scotty McCreery, American singer
- October 13 – Tiffany Trump, American Georgetown Law student, singer and socialite
- October 15 – Lucio Corsi, Italian singer and songwriter
- October 21 – Käärijä, Finnish rapper, singer and songwriter
- October 23 – Teeks, Māori soul singer
- October 25 – Grandson, Canadian-American singer-songwriter and musician
- November 1 – Pabllo Vittar, Brazilian singer-songwriter and drag queen
- November 5 – Shy Martin, Swedish singer and songwriter
- November 8 – Laycon, Nigerian rapper
- November 9 – Ronen Rubinstein, an Israeli-American actor, writer, director, environmental activist and lead singer of Nights in Stereo
- November 13 – Julia Michaels, American singer and songwriter
- November 14 – Namasenda, Sweden singer
- November 24 – Ivi Adamou, Greek Cypriot singer
- November 25 – Iris Mittenaere, French model and beauty queen
- November 26 – Erena Ono, Japanese singer
- November 27
  - Aubrey Peeples, American actress and singer
  - Dylan Brady, American music producer and singer-songwriter (100 gecs)
- November 29 – Alex Hope, Australian ARIA and APRA Award-winning producer, songwriter, and multi-instrumentalist
- December 1 – Drakeo the Ruler, American rapper and songwriter (d. 2021)
- December 7 – Jasmine Villegas, American singer
- December 8 – AnnaSophia Robb, American singer and actress
- December 10 – Rachel Trachtenburg, American singer and actress (Trachtenburg Family Slideshow Players and Supercute!)
- December 13 – Katya Kischuk, Russian singer (Serebro)
- December 19 – Alkaline, Jamaican dancehall musician
- December 22
  - Ali Lohan, American actress, model and singer
  - Meghan Trainor, American singer-songwriter, musician and producer
- December 29 – Chloe Kohanski, American singer-songwriter, 2017 American The Voice winner
- December 30 – Krishane, Jamaican pop artist (Tinie Tempah, Jess Glynne)

== Deaths ==
- January 6
  - Dizzy Gillespie, jazz trumpet virtuoso and co-founder of bebop, 76
  - Rudolf Nureyev, ballet dancer, 54
- January 13 – Gordon Tobing, Indonesian folk singer, 67
- January 15 – Sammy Cahn, songwriter, 79
- January 30 – Paulo Rosine, pianist and leader of Martinican band Malavoi
- February 3 – Karel Goeyvaerts, composer, 69
- February 25 – Toy Caldwell, guitarist (The Marshall Tucker Band), 45
- February 26 – Pina Carmirelli, violinist, founder member of the Boccherini Quintet, 78
- March 3 – Carlos Montoya, guitarist, 89
- March 31
  - Mitchell Parish, 92, US lyric writer
  - Nicanor Zabaleta, 86, Spanish harpist
- April 19 – Steve Douglas, saxophonist, 54
- April 23 – Daniel Jones, composer, 80
- April 30 – Mick Ronson, guitarist, 46 (liver cancer)
- May 22 – Juice Wilson, jazz violinist, 89
- May 30 – Sun Ra, jazz composer, 79
- June 5 – Conway Twitty (real name: Harold Jenkins) country rock singer, 59
- June 9 – Arthur Alexander, country soul singer, 53
- June 10 – Arleen Auger, American operatic soprano, 53 (brain tumor)
- June 13 – John Campbell, blues guitarist, 41 (heart failure)
- June 24 – Wong Ka Kui, co-founder of the Hong Kong rock band Beyond, 31 (stage accident)
- June 28 – GG Allin, punk singer, 36 (heroin overdose)
- July 7 – Mia Zapata (The Gits), 27 (murdered)
- July 14 – Léo Ferré, French singer, songwriter and composer, 76
- July 19 – Szymon Goldberg, Polish-born American violinist and conductor, 84
- July 21 – Richard Tee, pianist and singer, 49 (prostate cancer)
- August 5 – Eugen Suchoň, Slovak composer, 84
- August 7 – Roy Budd, jazz pianist and film composer, 46 (brain haemorrhage)
- August 10 – Øystein Aarseth, aka Euronymous, black metal guitarist of Mayhem fame, 25 (murdered)
- August 17 – Phil Seymour, drummer, guitarist and singer, 41 (cancer)
- August 21 – Tatiana Troyanos, operatic mezzo-soprano, 54 (breast cancer)
- August 25 – Janna Allen, songwriter, 36 (leukemia)
- August 26 – Rockin' Dopsie, zydeco accordionist and singer, 61
- September 9 – Helen O'Connell, singer, actress and dancer, 73
- September 22 – Maurice Abravanel, conductor, 90
- September 24 – Ian Stuart Donaldson, musician, frontman of Skrewdriver, 36 (car crash)
- October 23 – Elena Nicolai, opera singer, 88
- October 25 – Danny Chan, cantopop singer, 35
- October 31 – River Phoenix, actor and singer of Aleka's Attic, 23 (drug overdose)
- November 3 – Léon Theremin, inventor of the Theremin musical instrument, 97
- November 6 – Torsten Fenslau, (Culture Beat), 29 (car accident)
- November 7 – Adelaide Hall, jazz singer, actress, entertainer, 92
- November 11 – Erskine Hawkins, trumpet player and bandleader, 79
- November 16 – Lucia Popp, Slovak operatic soprano, 54 (brain cancer)
- November 18 – Arvid Fladmoe, Norwegian composer and conductor, 78
- November 20 – Sidney Griller, violinist and founder of the Griller Quartet, 82
- November 22 – Anthony Burgess, composer and polymath best known as a novelist, 76
- November 24 – Albert Collins, blues guitarist and singer, 61 (cancer)
- November 26 – César Guerra-Peixe, violinist and composer, 79
- November 28 - Jerry Edmonton, vocalist (Steppenwolf), 47
- November 30 – David Houston, singer, 57 (brain aneurysm)
- December 1 – Ray Gillen, former vocalist of Black Sabbath and Badlands, 34 (AIDS-related)
- December 4 – Frank Zappa, "Mothers of Invention" musician/composer, 52 (prostate cancer)
- December 5 – Doug Hopkins, guitarist and songwriter for Gin Blossoms, 32 (suicide)
- December 12 – Joan Cross, operatic soprano, 93
- December 19 – Michael Clarke, drummer (The Byrds), 47

== Awards ==
=== Filmfare Awards ===
- Kumar Sanu – Filmfare Best Male Playback Award
- Alka Yagnik & Ila Arun win the Filmfare Best Female Playback Award

=== Grammy Awards ===
- 1993 Grammy Awards

=== Country Music Association Awards ===
- 1993 Country Music Association Awards

=== Country Music Hall of Fame ===
- Willie Nelson

=== Eurovision Song Contest ===
- Eurovision Song Contest 1993

=== Japan Record Awards ===
- 35th Japan Record Awards

=== Mercury Music Prize ===
- Suede – Suede wins.

=== Glenn Gould Prize ===
- Oscar Peterson (laureate), Benny Green (protégé)

=== Rock and Roll Hall of Fame ===
- The Doors, Cream, Creedence Clearwater Revival, Sly and the Family Stone, Etta James, Van Morrison, Ruth Brown and Frankie Lymon and the Teenagers

== Charts ==
- List of Billboard Hot 100 number ones of 1993
- 1993 in British music#Charts
- List of Oricon number-one singles of 1993
- Triple J Hottest 100, 1993

== See also ==
- 1993 in British music
- Record labels established in 1993
