= Ten Speed =

Ten Speed may refer to:

- 10 Speed (album), album by Canadian band Mystery Machine (band)
- Road bicycle—10-speed is a 1970s American term describing road racing bicycles (using a derailleur) with 10 total gearing combinations, or speeds.
- Ten Speed Press
- Ten Speed (Of God's Blood and Burial)
- Tenspeed and Brown Shoe
