= Pigeonhole =

Pigeonhole or pigeon hole may refer to:

== Music ==
- Pigeon Hole (band), a Canadian hip hop duo
- Pigeonhole (album), by the band New Fast Automatic Daffodils

== Other uses ==
- Pigeonhole, a nesting space in a dovecote
- Pigeon-hole messagebox, a communication method
- Pigeonhole principle, a mathematical principle
- Pigeonhole sort, a sorting algorithm
- Pigeonholing, classifying things into categories
- Pigeon Hole Station, once part of Victoria River Downs Station, Northern Territory, Australia
