= Headfirst into Everything =

Headfirst Into Everything

Studio album by Mystery Machine
- Released: February 24, 1998
- Genre: Rock
- Length: 40:57
- Label: Nettwerk
- Producer: Vincent Jones

Mystery Machine chronology
10 Speed (1996)	Headfirst Into Everything (1998)	Western Magnetics (2012)

Headfirst Into Everything is the third studio album by the Canadian rock band Mystery Machine.

AllMusic stated in its review of the album, "Headfirst Into Everything finds the Mystery Machine backing away slightly from their frenzied beginnings and developing a new, mature sound."

== Track listing ==
Headfirst Into Everything track listing
No.	Title	Length
1.	"YTV"	2:30
2.	"Gleam"	3:41
3.	"Wake Up Pill"	2:37
4.	"Doubter"	2:51
5.	"Doubt Is All You Know"	2:47
6.	"I'm Not Anything"	3:12
7.	"What I Want"	2:31
8.	"Drone"	4:06
9.	"Teenage Drag"	2:24
10.	"Fool"	2:35
11.	"Ditch"	3:03
12.	"Mad"	3:04
13.	"Bring You Down"	5:36
Total length:		44:37
