= Western Magnetics =

Studio album by Mystery Machine
- Released: September 11, 2012
- Genre: Rock
- Label: Sonic Unyon
- Producer: Vincent Jones

Mystery Machine chronology
Headfirst Into Everything (1998)	Western Magnetics (2012)

Western Magnetics is the fourth studio album by the Canadian rock band Mystery Machine.

== Track listing ==
1. "Pronto"
2. "Japanese-Dads"
3. "Runways"
4. "Octagon Skylight"
5. "Floatist"
6. "We Won't Return"
7. "House on Fire"
8. "Snow"
9. "Bullshit Patrol"
10. "Northern Analog"
