= Moon Spirits =

Studio album by Dance 2 Trance
- Released: September 1992
- Studio: Allstar Warehouse, Frankfurt City
- Genre: Dance; techno; trance
- Label: Blow Up

Dance 2 Trance chronology
Moon Spirits (1992)	Revival (1995)

Professional ratings
Review scores
Source	Rating
NME	7/10
Select	4/5 medals

Moon Spirits is the debut album by German techno duo Dance 2 Trance. It was released in 1992 by Blow Up Records and features their European hit-single "P.ower of A.merican N.atives".

== Track listing ==
1. "Kayenta" – 6:19
2. "We Came in Peace" (Desert mix) – 5:05
3. "Freaks" – 6:21
4. "Sit Together" – 5:10
5. "Hello San Francisco" (Golden Gate mix) – 6:45
6. "Mr. Cannabis" – 9:18
7. "P.ower of A.merican N.atives" – 5:56
8. "Atlantis" – 5:10
9. "Remember Exxon Valdez" – 7:46
10. "Where Is Dag?" – 6:10
