= 1993 in South Korean music =

The following is a list of notable events and releases that happened in 1993 in music in South Korea.

== Debuting and disbanded in 1993 ==
=== Groups ===
- Crash
- Deux
- Solid
- Tin Tin Five

=== Soloists ===
- Shin Shin-ae
- Uhm Jung-hwa

== Releases in 1993 ==
=== January ===
| Date | Title | Artist | Genre(s) |

=== February ===
| Date | Title | Artist | Genre(s) |

=== March ===
| Date | Title | Artist | Genre(s) |
|---|---|---|---|
| 1 | Eight Smiles of Klein | Shin Sung-woo | Rock |

=== April ===
| Date | Title | Artist | Genre(s) |
|---|---|---|---|
| 15 | Because I Love You | Shin Seung-hun | Ballad |
| 23 | Deux | Deux | Hip hop |

=== May ===
| Date | Title | Artist | Genre(s) |

=== June ===
| Date | Title | Artist | Genre(s) |
|---|---|---|---|
| 21 | Seo Taiji and Boys II | Seo Taiji and Boys | Hip hop |
| — | 1 Photograph To Remember | SSAW | Jazz-rock fusion |

=== July ===
| Date | Title | Artist | Genre(s) |
|---|---|---|---|
| 1 | Sorrowful Secrets | Uhm Jung-hwa | K-pop |

=== August ===
| Date | Title | Artist | Genre(s) |
|---|---|---|---|
| 12 | The Natural | Yoon Jong-shin | Ballad |
| 25 | The Fourth Movement | 015B | Pop ballad |

=== September ===
| Date | Title | Artist | Genre(s) |
|---|---|---|---|
| 1 | Int. World Beat and Hiphop Of New Dance 3 | Hyun Jin-young | Hip hop |
| 1 | The Heart of... | Ha Soo-bin | Dance-pop |

=== October ===
| Date | Title | Artist | Genre(s) |
|---|---|---|---|
| 20 | Excuses | Kim Gun-mo | Ballad |

=== November ===
| Date | Title | Artist | Genre(s) |
|---|---|---|---|
| 1 | Loss of Memory | Boohwal | Rock |

=== December ===
| Date | Title | Artist | Genre(s) |
|---|---|---|---|
| 15 | Give Me a Chance | Solid | R&B |
| 30 | Deuxism | Deux | Hip hop |
| — | Tin Tin Five | Tin Tin Five | Comedy |

=== N/A ===
| Date | Title | Artist | Genre(s) |
|---|---|---|---|
| — | Endless Supply of Pain | Crash | Thrash metal |
