= Concussion Ensemble =

American post-rock group

- Origin: Boston, Massachusetts, United States
- Genres: Math rock, post-rock
- Years active: 1992–1994
- Labels: Conc
- Past members: Mike Brown; Rich Cortese; Larry Dersch; Terry Donahue; Rich Gilbert; Brian Gillespie; Ken Winokur

Concussion Ensemble were an American post-rock group formed in Boston, Massachusetts, in 1992. It consisted of three drummers, one percussionist (playing bedpan, horseshoe, pipes and other found objects), two guitarists and a bass player. Their music was completely instrumental and placed a strong emphasis on rhythm. The ensemble was short lived, only releasing a single and one full-length album. Other material was recorded but never officially issued. Most of the band members went on to form Coronet Premiers, another instrumental project which lessened their focus on percussion. Since 1990, percussionists Terry Donahue and Ken Winokur have formed two-thirds of the group Alloy Orchestra.

== Discography ==
Studio albums

- Stampede (1993, Conc)
