= New Fast Automatic Daffodils =

UK musical group

- Origin: Manchester, England
- Genres: Alternative rock; Madchester
- Years active: 1988–1995
- Labels: Playtime, Play It Again Sam, Strange Fruit, Mute
- Members: Andy Spearpoint (vocals); Dolan Hewison (guitar); Justin Crawford (bass); Perry Saunders (drums); Icarus Wilson-Wright (percussion)

New Fast Automatic Daffodils (later shortened to New FADS) were an alternative rock group from Manchester, England, active between 1988 and 1995.

== History ==
Formed in 1988 by Dolan Hewison (guitar), Justin Crawford (bass), Perry Saunders (drums) in Hulme whilst students at Manchester Polytechnic, the line-up was complete when Andy Spearpoint, who at the time was at drama school in Manchester, joined on vocals. The name comes from a poem by Adrian Henri that mixed an advertisement for the Dutch DAF car with the Wordsworth poem "I Wandered Lonely as a Cloud". Often associated with the Madchester scene of the late 1980s, but never really part of that scene, taking more inspiration from post punk labels such as Postcard Records, the band's debut single, "Lions" was released in 1989 on Playtime Records (then home to Inspiral Carpets), followed the same year by the Music Is Shit EP. In 1990, after the success of their breakthrough single "Big" they signed to Play It Again Sam Records, September of that year seeing the release of "Fishes Eyes", and debut album Pigeonhole appearing in November, which reached the UK top 50.

They developed a brilliant live reputation touring the UK, Europe and the US having secured deals with Mute / Elektra in the States. Further singles followed in 1991, working with legendary Factory producer Martin Hannett on a rerecorded version of "Get Better". In 1992 they de-camped to Belgium to work with producer Craig Leon on their second album Body Exit Mind, a more experimental record that was mostly recorded in live takes trying to capture the elusive live sound the band were known for. Released in October 1992 and reaching No. 57 in the UK, it spawned two NME singles of the week: "Its Not What You Know" and "Stockholm", the latter of which became a top 10 college radio hit in the US in 1993, also reaching No. 30 on the Billboard Modern Rock chart. 1994 saw the band shorten their name to New FADS, with 2 EPs released that year, before a final album, Love It All, in 1995. The band split up in 1995.

The band recorded three sessions for John Peel's radio show, the first two of which were compiled onto an album, The Peel Sessions in 1991. Their song "Big" also reached No. 14 in the Festive Fifty in 1990 and featured on the influential 1990 compilation album Happy Daze.

Singer Andy Spearpoint also flirted with acting, having a small part in Coronation Street.

== Post band activities ==
Andy Spearpoint now lives in Ireland and is embarking on an MA in music. Dolan Hewison is Managing Director of the ad agency Ear to the Ground and has recently released an album under the name Au-Turn. Icarus Wilson-Wright as well as working with Basement Jaxx as a percussionist is also a Video Artist working with Massive Attack and also exhibiting in the Turbine Hall at the Tate Modern. Justin Crawford is one part of DJ duo Unabombers and the infamous Electric Chair night as well as a prolific career as an artist recording solo under the name Only Child.

== Discography ==
=== Albums ===
- Pigeonhole (1990, Play It Again Sam) UK No. 49
  Some vinyl copies of Pigeonhole had a free 7" with a cover of the Velvet Underground's "I'm Set Free"
- The Peel Sessions (1991, Strange Fruit Records)
- Body Exit Mind (1992, Play It Again Sam) UK No. 57
- Love It All (1995, Play It Again Sam) (as New FADS)

=== Singles ===
- "Lions" (1989, Playtime)
- "Music Is Shit" EP (1989, Playtime)
- "Big" (1990 Amuse 7CD, Playtime) UK No. 109
- "Fishes Eyes" (1990 BIAS162 CD, Play It Again Sam) UK No. 77
- "Get Better" (1991 BIAS193 CD, Play It Again Sam) UK No. 85
- "All Over My Face" (1991 BIAS199 CD, Play It Again Sam) UK No. 96
- "Big" (1991, Playtime, Play It Again Sam & Mute)
- "It's Not What You Know" (1992, Play It Again Sam) UK No. 82
- "Stockholm" (1992, Play It Again Sam) UK No. 89
- "Bong" (1993, Play It Again Sam)
- "Life Is an Accident 1" (1994 BIAS249 CD1, Play It Again Sam) (as New FADS)
- "Life Is an Accident 2" (1994 BIAS249 CD2, Play It Again Sam) (as New FADS)
- "These Foolish Things" (1994, Play It Again Sam) (as New FADS)

=== Other appearances ===
- Wake Up and Make Love Before 8.30 in the Morning - Limited edition numbered VHS cassette (Visionary Communications Ltd). Eight songs recorded live and filmed using three cameras at the Palace in Bradford in 1989.
- Big In Manchester (Special Meagre Mix) - Promotional 12" single limited to 500 copies. Strange Fruit (SF45) 1990.
- Volume Two - Various Artists (Contains unique mix of "All Over My Face" (Scam Mix))
- “home” - various artists (Contains Jaggerbog) sheer joy records 1990
- Fifteen Minutes: A Tribute to the Velvet Underground (1994, Imaginary Records – ILLCD 047P, includes "I'm Set Free" by New F.A.D.S.
- This Is Fascism (1996, M.C. Projects – PROCD 14. A 2CD collection of remixes of the New Fast Automatic Daffodils cover of the song "This Is Fascism" by Consolidated)
- Kitchen Demos - Band released cassette (2023). Limited to 500 copies (DAF 3). Recreation of eight original demos recorded at The Kitchen, Hulme, Manchester in 1988.
