= Mina (German singer) =

German pop musician (born 1993)

- Born: 1993 (age 32–33); Munich, Germany
- Genres: Pop
- Occupation: Singer
- Years active: 2007–present

Mina (born 4 October 1993) is a German pop musician who became famous because of a video at the online portal MyVideo which was watched by four million viewers.

== Biography ==
Mina was born in Munich, where she attended a private school. When she was 13 years old, she went to a music studio in Augsburg where she recorded the song "How The Angels Fly"'. This song peaked at #24 of the German music charts. After that, she produced a music video for the song which reached high popularity at the video portals of MyVideo and YouTube, resulting in a recording contract with Warner Music.

Her first album was released on 14 December 2007 and was called Learn To Fly. It peaked at #77 in the German album charts.

Her single "I will Not Let You Down" appeared on the German soundtrack release of the movie Juno.

Since May 2008, Mina has hosted the show mädchen.tv, the TV format of the youth magazine of the same name.

== Discography ==
=== Singles ===
- 2007: How The Angels Fly
- 2008: I will not let you down

=== Albums ===
- 2007: Learn To Fly

== Awards ==
- 2008: Radio Regenbogen Award – Internet Award 2007
- 2008: DIVA Award – Web-Artist of the Year
