= Body Exit Mind =

Studio album by New Fast Automatic Daffodils
- Released: October 1992
- Genres: Alternative rock, dance-rock
- Label: Play It Again Sam (Europe)/Elektra (US)
- Producer: Craig Leon

New Fast Automatic Daffodils chronology
Pigeonhole (1990)	Body Exit Mind (1992)	Love It All (1995)

Singles from Body Exit Mind
- 1. "It's Not What You Know" Released: August 1992; 2. "Stockholm" Released: September 1992; 3. "Bong" Released: January 1993

Professional ratings
Review scores
Source	Rating
AllMusic	2/5 stars
Martin C. Strong	8/10 stars

Body Exit Mind was the second studio album released by the British indie rock band New Fast Automatic Daffodils, released on Play It Again Sam in Europe in October 1992, and on Elektra Records in March 1993 in the United States.

The record was produced by Craig Leon who is noted for producing the first three Ramones records as well as Blondie.

The album reached number 57 on the UK Album Chart.

== Track listing ==
1. Bong
2. It's Not What You Know
3. Stockholm
4. I Take You to Sleep
5. Bruises
6. Kyphos
7. Beatlemania
8. What Kind of Hell is This?
9. American Money
10. Missing Parts of Famous People
11. Patchwork Lives
12. Music

The CD release included a bonus CD EP, with the following tracks:

1. How Much Longer Shall We Tolerate Mass Culture?
2. Teenage Combo
3. Exit Body, Exit Mind

CD alternative listing:

1. Bong 4:05
2. It's Not What You Know 4:07
3. Stockholm 5:12
4. I Take You To Sleep 3:52
5. Bruises 6:58
6. How Much Longer Must We Tolerate Mass Culture? 1:19
7. Kyphos 4:44
8. Teenage Combo 0:25
9. Beatlemania 4:50
10. What Kind Of Hell Is This? 0:39
11. American Money 4:28
12. Missing Parts Of Famous People 1:05
13. Patchwork Lives 5:08
14. Music 8:08
15. Exit Body, Exit Mind 1:02

== Personnel ==
- Andy Spearpoint - vocals
- Dolan Hewison - guitar
- Justin Crawford - bass guitar
- Perry Saunders - drums
- Icarus Wilson-Knight - percussion
