= Pigeonhole (album) =

Studio album by New Fast Automatic Daffodils
- Released: 1990
- Genres: Madchester, dance-rock
- Label: Play It Again Sam (Europe)/Elektra (US)

New Fast Automatic Daffodils chronology
Pigeonhole (1990)	Body Exit Mind (1992)

Singles from Pigeonhole
- 1. "Big" Released: 1990; 2. "Fishes Eyes" Released: 1990; 3. "Get Better" Released: 1991

Professional ratings
Review scores
Source	Rating
AllMusic	4/5 stars
The Encyclopedia of Popular Music	3/5 stars
Martin C. Strong	8/10 stars

Pigeonhole is the first studio album by the British rock group New Fast Automatic Daffodils, released on Play It Again Sam in 1990.

It reached #49 on the British albums chart.

== Critical reception ==
Trouser Press wrote that "the lyrics are not nearly as important as percussion, bass and the overall groove of the song; like James Brown, [Andy] Spearpoint is happy to riff on a particular theme to the point of nonsense."

== Track listing ==
1. Get Better 3:52
2. Fishes Eyes 7:04
3. Working for Him 4:17
4. Part 4 4:13
5. Big 6:08
6. You Were Lying When You Said You Loved Me 4:17
7. Amplifier 3:57
8. Reprise 3:47
9. Partial 6:26
10. Penguins 3:51
11. I Found Myself In Another Room 3:51
12. Pigeonhole 6:06

== Personnel ==
- Andy Spearpoint - vocals
- Dolan Hewison - guitar
- Justin Crawford - bass guitar
- Perry Saunders - drums
- Icarus Wilson-Knight - percussion
