= Tin Tin Five =

South Korean dance-pop group (1993-2010)

- Genres: K-pop; dance-pop; comedy music
- Years active: 1993–2010
- Labels: SM
- Past members: Pyo In-bong; Lee Woong-ho; Hong Rok-gi; Lee Dong-woo; Kim Kyung-sik; Jung Sung-hwa; Kim Hak-joon

Tin Tin Five (Korean: 틴틴파이브; RR: Tin-tin-paibeu) was a South Korean dance-pop group formed in 1993. It consisted of five members: Pyo In-bong, Lee Woong-ho, Hong Rok-gi, Lee Dong-woo, and Kim Kyung-sik. All of whom are male comedians.

They debuted with their eponymous studio album in 1993. Before releasing their second studio album Here We Go in 1995, Hong was briefly replaced by musical actor Jung Sung-hwa and eventually Kim Hak-joon. The group then took five-year gaps between major projects: We Begin Again in 2000, Best of Best in 2005, and finally Five Men Five Stories in 2010.

Five Men, Five Stories' release was announced while taking into consideration that member Lee Dong-woo had been diagnosed of retinitis pigmentosa back in 2009. Notwithstanding the latter news despite still being out of respect for Lee, the "fifth full album"-slash-first EP was distributed on January 13. It featured contributions from actor Ahn Jae-wook, comedians Park Mi-sun and Song Eun-yi, and girl group f(x).

15 years ago until today, Tin Tin Five remains completely inactive, with SM Entertainment yet to issue any statement regarding the group's fate. In the meantime, the members have individually gone on to enjoy some success in variety television.

== Discography ==
=== Studio albums ===
Title	Details
Tin Tin Five 《틴틴파이브》 (Note: Another title in Korean may be used for Tin Tin Five: 《어떤 날은》.)	Released: December 1993; Label: Seeum Media; S.M. Studio; Formats: LP, CD, cassette tape, digital download, streaming; Track listing: 1. "어떤날은" (3:17); 2. "단지 난 너에게" (3:20); 3. "꿈꾸는 피터팬" (3:34); 4. "홀로서긴 아직 어리잖아" (3:51); 5. "내 기억속에" (3:19); 6. "비둘기" (3:08); 7. "너만을 바라보며" (2:34); 8. "나의 고백" (2:24)
Here We Go	Released: 1995; Label: Oasis Records; S.M. Studio; Formats: CD, cassette tape, digital download, streaming; Track listing: 1. "오늘같은 날" (4:10); 2. "널 잊을수 없는 이유" (4:16); 3. "다가 오지마" (3:21); 4. "너와 함께" (3:38); 5. "Ya Ya Ya" (야 야 야; 4:20); 6. "우리 처음 만난 날" (3:51); 7. "내가 원하는 대로" (3:29); 8. "Happy Birthday to You" (3:42)
We Begin Again	Released: April 2000; Label: Yedang Entertainment; S.M. Entertainment; Formats: CD, cassette tape, digital download, streaming; Track listing: 1. "Intro (선수입장)" (2:04); 2. "그날 그 밤처럼" (3:50); 3. "Get Off Your Head" (머리 치워 머리; 3:40); 4. "Crazy Love" (2:07); 5. "내마음을 뺏어봐" (3:33); 6. "별" (5:06); 7. "어화둥둥 내사랑" (3:44); 8. "나 좀 살려줘" (4:07); 9. "넥타이" (3:05); 10. "애. 우. 야" (4:41); 11. "Hey — Ho!" (3:46); 12. "Madonna" (3:29); 13. "이동우의 재회" (4:51); 14. "Rewind" (3:07); 15. "서 시" (0:47); 16. "어떤날은 Part 2" (3:15)
Best of Best 《틴틴파이브 Best Of Best》 (Note: An alternative title may be used for Best of Best: Best of Best 4.) (Note: Best of Best is also considered to be a greatest hits album.)	Released: October 10, 2005; Label: S.M. Entertainment; Huge Entertainment; Formats: CD, digital download, streaming; Track listing: 1. "돈만만이 돈만이" (3:30); 2. "너에게 난 나에게 넌" (4:31); 3. "2005 어화둥둥 내여보" (3:32); 4. "Get Off Your Head" (머리 치워 머리; 3:40); 5. "Crazy Love" (2:07); 6. "2000 어화둥둥 내사랑" (3:44); 7. "너만을 바라보며" (2:30); 8. "Ya Ya Ya" (야 야 야; 4:21); 9. "별" (5:06); 10. "나의 고백" (2:23); 11. "어떤날은" (3:17)

=== Extended plays ===
Title	Details	Peak chart positions
Title	Details	KOR
Five Men, Five Stories 《다섯남자의 다섯번째 이야기》	Released: January 13, 2010; Label: S.M. Entertainment; Formats: CD, digital download, streaming; Track listing: 1. "Good Days" (Note: Korean: 청춘) (with Ahn Jae-wook); 2. "별꼴이야" (Note: Korean: 별꼴이야) ((f(TinTin)=☆); with f(x)); 3. "Down" (Note: Korean: 견디셔) (with Park Mi-sun, Song Eun-yi); 4. "Annie's Dream" (Note: Korean: 지우의 꿈) (solo by Lee Dong-woo); 5. "Tong Tong Five" (Note: Korean: 빼자)	27
