= Glazed (album) =

Studio album by Mystery Machine
- Released: 1993
- Recorded: June–July 1992
- Studios: Mushroom (tracks 1–5, 8, 9, 11–14); "The Deep End" (tracks 6, 7 and 10)
- Genre: Rock
- Length: 49:44
- Label: Nettwerk
- Producer: Mystery Machine

Mystery Machine chronology
Stain EP (1992)	Glazed (1993)	10 Speed (1996)

Glazed is the first studio album by the Canadian rock band Mystery Machine, released in 1993 via Nettwerk Records.

== Critical reception ==
Professional ratings
Review scores
Source	Rating
AllMusic	3/5 stars
Calgary Herald	B−
MusicHound Rock: The Essential Album Guide	3/5 stars

AllMusic wrote: "Tempos shift, guitar playing is melodically dissonant (oddly enough) and jagged, and everything is layered into a big wash of sound."

== Track listing ==
- Lyrics by Luke Rogalsky. Music by Mystery Machine.
1. "Shaky Ground" - 3:11
2. "Everyone's Alright" - 2:58
3. "Valley Song" - 4:54
4. "Ride" - 5:10
5. "Stay High" - 2:37
6. "Hooked" - 1:39
7. "Floored" - 3:45
8. "Hi-Test" - 0:52
9. "Invitation" - 2:19
10. "Salty" - 0:57
11. "Underground" - 4:36
12. "Broken" - 2:29
13. "Slack" - 5:05
14. "Stain Master" - 9:37
