= From Despair to Where =

1993 single by Manic Street Preachers

Single by Manic Street Preachers

from the album Gold Against the Soul
- B-side: "Hibernation"; "Spectators of Suicide" (Heavenly version); "Starlover" (Heavenly version)
- Released: 1 June 1993
- Genre: Glam rock; grunge; soft rock
- Length: 3:34
- Label: Columbia
- Songwriters: Richey Edwards; Nicky Wire; James Dean Bradfield; Sean Moore

Manic Street Preachers singles chronology
"Little Baby Nothing" (1992)	"From Despair to Where" (1993)	"La Tristesse Durera (Scream to a Sigh)" (1993)

Music video
- "From Despair to Where" on YouTube

"From Despair to Where" is a song by Welsh alternative rock band Manic Street Preachers. It was released on 1 June 1993 by record label Columbia as the first single from their second studio album, Gold Against the Soul (1993).

== Release ==
The single reached number 25 in the UK Singles Chart on 12 June 1993. The CD includes the B-sides "Hibernation", "Spectators of Suicide (Heavenly Records version)" and "Starlover (Heavenly Records version)". The 12-inch version does not include "Starlover", and the cassette only features "Hibernation". "From Despair to Where" made an appearance on Forever Delayed (2002), the Manics' greatest hits album.

== Track listing ==
CD

No.	Title	Length
1.	"From Despair to Where"	3:36
2.	"Hibernation"	3:31
3.	"Spectators of Suicide" (Heavenly version)	5:06
4.	"Starlover" (Heavenly version)	2:39

12-inch

Side A
No.	Title	Length
1.	"From Despair to Where"	3:36

Side B
No.	Title	Length
1.	"Hibernation"	3:31
2.	"Spectators of Suicide" (Heavenly version)	5:06

Cassette

Side A
No.	Title	Length
1.	"From Despair to Where"	3:36

Side B
No.	Title	Length
1.	"Hibernation"	3:31

== Charts ==
Chart (1993)	Peak position
UK Singles (OCC)	25
UK Airplay (Music Week)	33

== Release history ==
Region	Date	Format(s)	Label(s)	Ref.
United Kingdom	1 June 1993	12-inch vinyl; CD; cassette	Columbia	
Japan	10 June 1993	CD	Epic	
Australia	20 September 1993	CD; cassette	Columbia	
