= Power of American Natives =

Single by Dance 2 Trance featuring Linda Rocco

from the album Moon Spirits
- Released: 1992
- Genre: Dance-pop; hi-NRG; Techno
- Length: 3:52
- Label: Blow Up; Dance Pool; Logic Records
- Songwriters: DJ Dag; Jam El Mar; Linda Rocco
- Producer: Dance 2 Trance

Dance 2 Trance featuring Linda Rocco singles chronology
"Hello San Francisco" (1992)	"Power of American Natives" (1992)	"Take a Free Fall" (1993)

Music video
- "Power of American Natives" on YouTube

"Power of American Natives" (sometimes also spelled as "P.ower of A.merican N.atives") is a song by German techno duo Dance 2 Trance featuring vocals by USA-born, Germany-based singer Linda Rocco. Released in 1992 by Blow Up, Dance Pool and Logic Records as the third single from the duo's first album, Moon Spirits (1992), it is their most commercially successful single, and now widely considered as a classic of its genre. It peaked within the top 10 in Austria, Belgium, Finland, Germany, the Netherlands, Norway and Spain. In the UK, it was a top-30 hit, peaking at number 25, but fared even better on the UK dance and club charts, peaking at number three. The single sold 250,000 records and was awarded a gold disc in Germany. Its accompanying music video reached the mainstream networks such as MTV.

In 1998, the song was released in a new remix by DJ Quicksilver, charting in Austria, Germany and Sweden. Also in 1997 and 2009, remixes were released.

== Background and release ==
The song was originally made as an instrumental and vocals were added after the record company insisted on that a hit needed vocals. Because DJ Dag Lerner had an interest in American Indians, the duo came up with the vocal line in the studio, inspired by "Everybody's Free". Jam El Mar told in an interview in 2020, "I had this idea of this line because of 'Everybody's Free'. Yeah, Rozalla, you know that high note. That long high note and I thought something like this could easily happen on this track too. And I think this is cool and so I had this idea of the melody and Linda [Rocco] had this idea of this talking, this kind of rap thing. It's not a real rap, it's more like a rhythmical talk. And then we recorded it and Linda was absolutely brilliant on this like a really rock voice. Edgy and powerful."

El Mar first met American-born Rocco in the 1980s and she was invited to the studio to record the vocals. Rocco told about making the song in the book Move Your Body (2 The 90s): Unlimited Eurodance, "I had been working for a long time already with Rolf Elmer (Jam El Mar) and one day he asked if I would be interested in singing on Dance 2 Trance's new song. They had already released 'Power of American Natives' as an instrumental but didn't have much success with it. I then wrote the spoken verses, sang the hook, and the rest is history." She added, "And yes, people know exactly who I am on this song. It is still played numerous times a day around the world!!"

The soon-to-be-famous pan flute sound on "Power of American Natives" was found completely by chance. El Mar has told, "I was like, wow, this is great. And I was looking at Dag and he said, 'Yeah let's go for this, let's go for this.' And so we played the melody. We put it together and then there was this melody. So it was one of those things where you had really to suffer to find the right thing, you know, that was missing in the track." The success of the track was unexpected, but the record company had high hopes and it got a lot of feedback from DJs, earning the duo their first gold disc for 250 000 singles sold in Germany. Dance 2 Trance and Rocco performed it on TV-shows, such as TOTP in the UK, where "Power of American Natives" reached number 25 on the UK Singles Chart.

== Critical reception ==
In his weekly UK chart commentary, James Masterton wrote, "Another dance hit that crosses over having finally been released, this could well make a big impact on the chart in future having already picked up a great deal of radio airplay even before its release, which probably prompted this relatively strong new entry." Andy Beevers from Music Week named it Pick of the Week in the category of Dance and gave the song three out of five, describing it as a "trancey tribute to American Indians". He added that "with its nice pan pipe samples and exclusive UK remix by Jam & Spoon, it is now getting plenty of club exposure here and should sell well."

Kris Needs from NME wrote, "These two must have an American fixation — their last single was called 'Hello San Francisco' and now comes a (rather noisily) voiced tribute to the American Indian. Make for the Ethno Instrumental Mix where pipes parp and the trance quotient gets an erection which could blow Tonto's loincloth clean out of the window." On the album review, Needs praised it as "perfect hi-tech dance-pop" with "raucous vocal", concluding, "It sounds as good banging out of the radio as it does shaking a dancefloor." James Hamilton from the Record Mirror Dance Update named "Power of American Natives" an "Andean pan-pipes tootled trancey Hi-NRG galloper" in his weekly dance column.

== Chart performance ==
"Power of American Natives" was successful on the singles chart across Europe. It peaked at number two in the Netherlands in June 1993, as well as on the European Dance Radio Chart in July same year, being kept from the number-one position by Janet Jackson's "That's the Way Love Goes". On the Dutch Top 40, the song peaked at the next best position for two weeks, being held off the top spot by Haddaway's "What Is Love". "Power of American Natives" entered the top 10 also in Austria (7), Belgium (10), Finland (3), Germany (9), Norway (5) and Spain (9). In the UK, it reached number 25 on the UK Singles Chart, but was more successful on both the Music Week Dance Singles chart and UK Club Chart, peaking at number three on both charts. Additionally, the single was a top-20 hit in Denmark (12), Ireland (16), Sweden (15) and Switzerland (11), as well as on the Eurochart Hot 100, where it hit number 13 in May 1993, in its twelfth week on the chart. In France, it entered the top 50 (50). Outside Europe, it became a top-20 hit also in Israel, peaking at number 12.

== Track listing ==
"'Power of American Natives' was inspired by DJ Dag's inspiration by American Indians. It was the last track among the tracks of the Moon Spirits album, and we had to deliver a potential chart hit to the record company. After a long search we finally ended ut with this pan flute melody. But still there was no vocal on it. We hired a studio and asked Linda Rocco, a great female rock singer I knew for some time, into the studio. Eventually we had a recording and the record company was super happy. It became our first ever golden record!"

— Jam El Mar talking about the song.
- 12", Germany (1992)
1. "P.ower of A.merican N.atives" (Vocal Mix) — 6:34
2. "P.ower of A.merican N.atives" (Ethno Instrumental Mix) — 5:57
3. "P.ower of A.merican N.atives" (Airplay Edit) — 3:51
- CD single, the Netherlands (1992)
1. "Power of American Natives" (Airplay Edit) — 3:52
2. "Power of American Natives" (Vocal Mix) — 6:34
- CD maxi, Germany (1992)
1. "Power of American Natives" (Airplay Edit) — 3:52
2. "Power of American Natives" (Vocal Mix) — 6:34
3. "Power of American Natives" (Ethno Instrumental Mix) — 5:57

== Charts ==
=== Weekly charts ===
Chart (1992–93)	Peak position
Austria (Ö3 Austria Top 40)	7
Belgium (Ultratop 50 Flanders)	10
Denmark (IFPI)	12
Europe (Eurochart Hot 100)	13
Europe (European Dance Radio)	2
Finland (Suomen virallinen lista)	3
France (SNEP)	50
Germany (GfK)	9
Ireland (IRMA)	16
Israel (Israeli Singles Chart)	12
Netherlands (Dutch Top 40)	2
Netherlands (Single Top 100)	3
Norway (VG-lista)	5
Spain (AFYVE)	9
Sweden (Sverigetopplistan)	15
Switzerland (Schweizer Hitparade)	11
UK Singles (OCC)	25
UK Dance (Music Week)	3
UK Club Chart (Music Week)	3

=== Year-end charts ===
Chart (1993)	Position
Belgium (Ultratop Flanders)	58
Europe (Eurochart Hot 100)	48
Europe (European Dance Radio)	15
Germany (Official German Charts)	29
Netherlands (Dutch Top 40)	12
Netherlands (Single Top 100)	26
UK Club Chart (Music Week)	98

== Certifications ==
Region	Certification	Certified units/sales
Germany (BVMI)	Gold	250,000^{^}
^{^} Shipments figures based on certification alone.
