= List of Oricon number-one singles of 1993 =

The following is a list of Oricon number-one singles of 1993

== Oricon Weekly Singles Chart ==
Issue date	Song	Artist(s)	Ref.
January 4	"Sekaijū no Dare Yori Kitto"	Miho Nakayama and Wands	
January 11	"Sekaijū no Dare Yori Kitto"	Miho Nakayama and Wands	
January 18	"Sekaijū no Dare Yori Kitto"	Miho Nakayama and Wands	
January 25	"Motto Tsuyoku Dakishimeta nara"	Wands	
February 1	"Motto Tsuyoku Dakishimeta nara"	Wands	
February 8	"Gajaimo"	Tunnels	
February 15	"Dokoku"	Shizuka Kudo	
February 22	"Osaekirenai kono Kimochi"	T-Bolan	
March 1	"Makenai De"	Zard	
March 8	"Toki no Tobira"	Wands	
March 15	"Yah Yah Yah / Yume no Bannin"	Chage and Aska	
March 22	"Yah Yah Yah / Yume no Bannin"	Chage and Aska	
March 29	"Ai no mama ni Wagamama ni Boku wa Kimi dake o Kizutsukenai"	B'z	
April 5	"Ai no mama ni Wagamama ni Boku wa Kimi dake o Kizutsukenai"	B'z	
April 12	"Ai no mama ni Wagamama ni Boku wa Kimi dake o Kizutsukenai"	B'z	
April 19	"Ai no mama ni Wagamama ni Boku wa Kimi dake o Kizutsukenai"	B'z	
April 26	"Ai wo Kataru yori Kuchizuke wo Kawasou"	Wands	
May 3	"Ai wo Kataru yori Kuchizuke wo Kawasou"	Wands	
May 10	"Ai wo Kataru yori Kuchizuke wo Kawasou"	Wands	
May 17	"Ai wo Kataru yori Kuchizuke wo Kawasou"	Wands	
May 24	"Natsu Wo Machi Kire Nakute"	Tube	
May 31	"Yureru Omoi"	Zard	
June 7	"Yureru Omoi"	Zard	
June 14	"Hadashi no megami"	B'z	
June 21	"Hadashi no megami"	B'z	
June 28	"Setsunasa o keseya shinai/Kizu darake o dakishimete"	T-Bolan	
July 5	"Setsunasa o keseya shinai/Kizu darake o dakishimete"	T-Bolan	
July 12	"Datte natsu janai"	Tube	
July 19	"Koi Seyo Otome"	Wands	
July 26	"Koi Seyo Otome"	Wands	
August 2	"Erotica Seven"	Southern All-Stars	
August 9	"Manatsu no yo no yume"	Yumi Matsutoya	
August 16	"Manatsu no yo no yume"	Yumi Matsutoya	
August 23	"Erotica Seven"	Southern All-Stars	
August 30	"Songs and Daughter"	Chage and Aska	
September 6	"Songs and Daughter"	Chage and Aska	
September 13	"No.1"	Noriyuki Makihara	
September 20	"Go for it!/Ame no owaru basho"	Dreams Come True	
September 27	"Go for it!/Ame no owaru basho"	Dreams Come True	
October 4	RUN	Tsuyoshi Nagabuchi	
October 11	Ichizu na koi	TMN	
October 18	Mayonaka no Dundee	Keisuke Kuwata	
October 25	Kaze ni fukarete	Chisato Moritaka	
November 1	Datte so janai!?	Lindberg	
November 8	Datte so janai!?	Lindberg	
November 15	Kitto wasurenai	Zard	
November 22	True Love	Fumiya Fujii	
November 29	True Love	Fumiya Fujii	
December 6	True Love	Fumiya Fujii	
December 13	True Love	Fumiya Fujii	
December 20	True Love	Fumiya Fujii	
December 27	Romance no kamisama	Komi Hirose	
