= Stampede (Concussion Ensemble album) =

Studio album by Concussion Ensemble
- Released: November 16, 1993
- Recorded: Summer 1993
- Studio: Fort Apache, Cambridge, MA
- Genre: Math rock, post-rock
- Length: 45:55
- Label: Conc

Professional ratings
Review scores
Source	Rating
Allmusic	2.5/5 stars

Stampede is the only studio album of Concussion Ensemble, released in 1993 by Conc Records. The album was well-received, with The New York Times saying that "Concussion Ensemble showed that stamina and power, more than complexity and originality, are what make ensemble drumming such an invigorating experience."

== Track listing ==
No.	Title	Music	Length
1.	"Nausea"	Brown, Cortese, Dersch, Donahue, Gilbert, Gillespie, Winokur	4:16
2.	"Smash-Up"	Gilbert	5:18
3.	"Killarnie"	Gilbert	3:13
4.	"Requiem"	Brown, Cortese, Dersch, Donahue, Gilbert, Gillespie, Winokur	5:06
5.	"Roadkill"	Gillespie	4:35
6.	"Bulldozer"	Gilbert	4:51
7.	"Cleopatra 94"	Gilbert	4:30
8.	"Voodoo"	Brown, Cortese, Dersch, Donahue, Gilbert, Gillespie, Winokur	3:49
9.	"Bugs"	Brown, Cortese, Dersch, Donahue, Gilbert, Gillespie, Winokur	7:26
10.	"Vertigo"	Brown, Cortese, Dersch, Donahue, Gilbert, Gillespie, Winokur	2:51

== Personnel ==
Adapted from the Stampede liner notes.

Concussion Ensemble

- Mike Brown – electric guitar
- Rich Cortese – bass guitar
- Larry Dersch – drums
- Terry Donahue – drums
- Rich Gilbert – electric guitar
- Brian Gillespie – drums, sampler (4)
- Ken Winokur – percussion

Additional musicians

- Dana Colley – baritone saxophone (1)
- Fielder George Dowding – bagpipes (4)
- Don Eheman – sampler (4)
- Russ Gershon – tenor saxophone (1)
- Tom Halter – trumpet (1)
- Malcolm Travis – drums (6, 9)

Production and additional personnel

- Carl Plaster – recording, mixing
- George Simian – cover art, photography

== Release history ==
Region	Date	Label	Format	Catalog
United States	November 16, 1993	Conc	CD	CONC 001
