= Dance 2 Trance =

German dance music duo

- Also known as: Peyote, The Odd Company
- Origin: Frankfurt, Germany
- Genres: Dance, techno, trance
- Occupations: Producers, DJs
- Years active: 1990–1995
- Labels: Suck Me Plasma; Blow Up
- Past members: DJ Dag; Rolf Ellmer

Dance 2 Trance was a German trance/techno duo consisting of Rolf Ellmer and DJ Dag Lerner. They are best known for their 1992 hit single "Power of American Natives", and they also released a small number of other singles in the mid-1990s. The duo was associated with Jam & Spoon.

== History ==
DJ Dag and Jam El Mar met in 1990, when they decided to collaborate. Their first release that same year was a promotional single titled "Dance 2 Trance" on the Suck Me Plasma label, which included two tracks: "Dance 2 Trance" and "We Came In Peace." They achieved their commercial breakthrough in 1992 with the release of "Power of American Natives," featuring vocals from Linda Rocco. The song sold 250,000 copies and was awarded a gold disc. A music video was created for the song, which reached mainstream networks such as MTV. The track later received remixes in 1997, 1998, and 2009. In 1992, they released their first album, Moon Spirits, followed by another album titled Revival in 1995.

German duo, Dance 2 Trance, form a critical reference point in the origins of trance with their 1990 track ‘We Came in Peace’.

In 1995, both Dag and Jam El Mar decided to pursue separate paths, with DJ Dag going solo while Ellmer focused more on his other side project, Jam & Spoon. In response, the German label Blow Up released a CD compilation album in 1996, consisting of thirteen Dance 2 Trance tracks from their five-year career.

== Discography ==
=== Albums ===
- 1992 – Moon Spirits
- 1995 – Revival
- 1996 – Works

=== Singles ===
Year	Single	Peak chart positions											Album
Year	Single	GER	AUT	EUR	FIN	FRA	IRE	NED	NOR	SWE	SWI	UK	Album
1990	"We Came in Peace"	—	—	—	—	—	—	—	—	—	—	—	Singles only
1991	"Let's Get Rollin'"	—	—	—	—	—	—	—	—	—	—	—	Singles only
1991	"Where Is Dag?"	—	—	—	—	—	—	—	—	—	—	—	Moon Spirits
1992	"Hello San Francisco"	—	—	—	—	—	—	—	—	—	—	—	Moon Spirits
1992	"Power of American Natives" featuring Linda Rocco	9	7	13	3	50	16	2	5	15	11	25	Moon Spirits
1993	"Take a Free Fall"	24	13	42	7	—	25	32	—	—	37	36	Moon Spirits
1994	"Warrior"	47	—	—	—	—	—	—	—	—	42	56	Revival
1995	"I Have a Dream (Enuf Eko?)"	—	—	—	—	—	—	—	—	—	—	—	Revival
1997	"Power of American Natives '98"	59	29	—	—	—	—	—	—	36	—	—	Single only
"—" denotes releases that did not chart.
