= Run-DMC discography =

Run-D.M.C. discography
- Studio albums: 7
- Live albums: 1
- Compilation albums: 6
- Singles: 30

The following is a comprehensive discography of Run-DMC, an American hip hop group.

Run-D.M.C. have had hit singles across the globe from Australia and New Zealand to Belgium and Ireland. Their biggest hit outside of the US was the Jason Nevins remix of "It's Like That".

== Albums ==
=== Studio albums ===
List of studio albums, with selected details, chart positions, sales and certifications
Title	Album details	Peak chart positions										Sales	Certifications (sales thresholds)
Title	Album details	US	US R&B/HH	AUS	CAN	GER	NED	NZ	SWE	SWI	UK	Sales	Certifications (sales thresholds)
Run-D.M.C.	Released: March 27, 1984; Label: Profile; Formats: CD, LP, cassette, digital download	53	14	—	—	—	—	—	—	—	—		RIAA: Gold
King of Rock	Released: January 21, 1985; Label: Profile; Formats: CD, LP, cassette, digital download	52	12	—	—	—	—	—	—	—	—		RIAA: Platinum
Raising Hell	Released: May 27, 1986; Label: Profile; Formats: CD, LP, cassette, digital download	3	1	50	32	49	28	8	—	—	41		RIAA: 3× Platinum; BPI: Silver; MC: Platinum
Tougher Than Leather	Released: May 17, 1988; Label: Profile; Formats: CD, LP, cassette, digital download	9	2	38	51	46	46	43	35	28	13		RIAA: Platinum; MC: Gold
Back from Hell	Released: October 16, 1990; Label: Profile; Formats: CD, LP, cassette, digital download	81	16	—	—	—	—	—	—	—	—	US: 300,000+	
Down with the King	Released: May 4, 1993; Label: Profile; Formats: CD, LP, cassette, digital download	7	1	—	29	60	—	—	—	—	44	US: 370,000+	RIAA: Gold; MC: Gold
Crown Royal	Released: April 3, 2001; Label: Arista; Formats: CD, LP, cassette	37	22	48	—	39	—	—	—	40	102	US: 142,000+	
"—" denotes a recording that did not chart or was not released in that territory.

=== Compilation albums ===
List of compilation albums, with selected details, chart positions and certifications
Title	Album details	Peak chart positions								Certifications (sales thresholds)
Title	Album details	US	US R&B/HH	AUS	FIN	GER	NED	SWE	UK	Certifications (sales thresholds)
Together Forever: Greatest Hits 1983–1991	Released: November 1991; Label: Arista	199	75	—	—	35	88	58	—	
Together Forever: Greatest Hits 1983–1998	Released: June 1998; Label: Arista	—	—	84	32	—	—	—	31	
High Profile: The Original Rhymes	Released: January 2002; Label: BMG	—	—	—	—	—	—	—	—	
Greatest Hits	Released: September 2002; Label: Arista	117	33	—	—	—	—	—	15	BPI: Gold
The Best of Run-DMC	Released: March 2003; Label: BMG	—	—	—	—	—	—	—	—	
Ultimate Run-D.M.C.	Released: October 2003; Label: Arista	—	62	—	—	—	—	—	—	
The Best of Run-DMC	Released: 2007; Label: Sony BMG	—	—	—	—	—	—	—	—	
The Essential Run-D.M.C.	Released: October 2012; Label: Sony, Legacy	—	—	—	—	—	—	—	—	
"—" denotes a recording that did not chart or was not released in that territory.

=== Live albums ===
Title	Album details
Live at Montreux 2001	Released: April 2007; Label: Eagle

== Singles ==
=== As lead artist ===
List of singles, with selected chart positions and certifications, showing year released and album name
Title	Year	Peak chart positions										Certifications	Album
Title	Year	US	US R&B/HH	AUS	AUT	BEL	CAN	NED	NZ	SWI	UK	Certifications	Album
"It's Like That"	1983	—	15	—	—	—	—	—	—	—	—		Run-D.M.C.
"Hard Times"	1984	—	11	—	—	—	—	—	—	—	—		Run-D.M.C.
"Rock Box"	1984	—	22	—	—	—	—	—	—	—	—		Run-D.M.C.
"30 Days"	1984	—	16	—	—	—	—	—	—	—	—		Run-D.M.C.
"Hollis Crew (Krush Groove 2)"	1984	—	65	—	—	—	—	—	—	—	—		Run-D.M.C.
"King of Rock"	1985	—	14	—	—	—	—	—	—	—	80		King of Rock
"You Talk Too Much"	1985	—	19	—	—	—	—	—	—	—	—		King of Rock
"Can You Rock It Like This"	1985	—	19	—	—	—	—	—	—	—	—		King of Rock
"Jam-Master Jammin' (Remix)"	1985	—	53	—	—	—	—	—	—	—	—		King of Rock
"My Adidas"	1986	—	5	—	—	—	—	—	—	—	62		Raising Hell
"Walk This Way" (with Aerosmith)	1986	4	8	9	26	6	6	2	1	9	8	RIAA: Platinum; BPI: Platinum; MC: Gold	Raising Hell
"You Be Illin' (Remix)"	1986	29	12	—	—	29	—	—	—	—	42		Raising Hell
"It's Tricky"	1987	57	21	—	—	—	—	—	—	—	16	RIAA: 2× Platinum; BPI: Gold	Raising Hell
"Christmas in Hollis"	1987	—	78	—	—	—	—	75	—	—	56		A Very Special Christmas
"Run's House"	1988	—	10	—	—	—	—	—	—	—	37		Tougher Than Leather
"Mary, Mary"	1988	75	29	73	—	—	—	—	14	—	86		Tougher Than Leather
"I'm Not Going Out Like That"	1988	—	40	—	—	—	—	—	—	—	—		Tougher Than Leather
"Papa Crazy"	1988	—	—	—	—	—	—	—	—	—	—		Tougher Than Leather
"Pause"	1989	—	51	—	—	—	—	—	—	—	—		Back from Hell
"Ghostbusters"	1989	—	—	56	—	—	—	—	34	—	65		Ghostbusters II Soundtrack and Back from Hell
"What's It All About"	1990	—	24	—	—	—	—	—	—	—	48		Back from Hell
"Faces"	1991	—	57	—	—	—	—	—	—	—	78		Back from Hell
"Ooh, Whatcha Gonna Do"	1993	— (Note: "Ooh, Whatcha Gonna Do" did not enter the Billboard Hot 100, but peaked at number six on the Bubbling Under Hot 100.)	78	—	—	—	—	—	—	—	82		Down with the King
"Down with the King" (featuring Pete Rock & CL Smooth)	1993	21	9	81	—	—	80	—	—	—	69	RIAA: Gold	Down with the King
"Can I Get It, Yo" (featuring EPMD)	1993	—	—	—	—	—	—	—	—	—	—		Down with the King
"It's Like That" (vs Jason Nevins)	1997	— (Note: "It's Like That" did not enter the Billboard Hot 100, but peaked at number 13 on the Bubbling Under Hot 100.)	90	1	2	2	3	1	1	1	1	ARIA: 2× Platinum; BEA: Platinum; BPI: 3× Platinum; IFPI AUT: Gold; IFPI SWI: Platinum; SNEP: Gold	Together Forever: Greatest Hits 1983–1998
"(It's) Tricky" (vs Jason Nevins)	1998	—	—	15	11	25	—	34	5	22	74		Together Forever: Greatest Hits 1983–1998
"Rock Show" (featuring Stephan Jenkins)	2001	—	—	—	—	—	—	—	—	—	—		Crown Royal
"It's Tricky 2003" (featuring Jacknife Lee)	2003	—	—	—	—	—	—	—	—	—	20		Non-album single
"It's Tricky" (DJ Fresh Remix)	2014	—	—	—	—	—	—	—	—	—	73		Non-album single
"—" denotes a recording that did not chart or was not released in that territory.

=== As featured artist ===
Year	Single	Peak chart positions										Album
Year	Single	US	US R&B/HH	AUS	BEL	CAN	GER	NED	NZ	SWI	UK	Album
1984	"8 Million Stories" (Kurtis Blow featuring Run-D.M.C)	—	45	—	—	—	—	—	—	—	—	Ego Trip
1985	"Sun City" (as part of Artists United Against Apartheid)	38	21	4	4	10	17	4	4	7	21	Sun City
1986	"King Holiday" (as part of King Dream Chorus & Holiday Crew)	—	30	—	—	—	—	—	—	—	—	Non-album single
"—" denotes a recording that did not chart or was not released in that territory.
