= The Essential Run-D.M.C. =

2012 compilation album by Run-DMC

Compilation album by Run-DMC
- Released: October 30, 2012
- Genre: Hip hop
- Length: 1:53:00
- Labels: Sony; Legacy; Profile; Arista
- Producers: Larry Smith; Russell Simmons; Run-DMC; Jam Master Jay; Rick Rubin; Davy D; The Bomb Squad; DJ Red Alert; Pete Rock; Q-Tip; Kid Rock

Run-DMC chronology
Ultimate Run-D.M.C. (2003)	The Essential Run-D.M.C. (2012)

Professional ratings
Review scores
Source	Rating
AllMusic	4.5/5 stars
PopMatters	7/10 stars

The Essential Run-D.M.C is a two-disc compilation album by American hip hop group Run-DMC, released on October 30, 2012. It is a part of Sony BMG's Essential series of compilation albums and includes selections from Run-DMC's back catalog from 1983 through 2001.

== Track listing ==
=== Disc 1 ===
No.	Title	Writer(s)	Originally from	Length
1.	"Sucker M.C.'s (Krush-Groove 1)"	Darryl McDaniels, Joseph Simmons, Nathaniel S. Hardy Jr., Terrance Balfour, Larry Smith	Run-D.M.C. (1984)	3:10
2.	"They Call Us Run-D.M.C."	Darryl McDaniels, Joseph Simmons, Jason Mizell	Tougher Than Leather (1988)	2:56
3.	"Peter Piper"	Darryl McDaniels, Joseph Simmons	Raising Hell (1986)	3:22
4.	"Rock Box (7" Version)"	Darryl McDaniels, Joseph Simmons, Larry Smith	Run-DMC (1984)	4:08
5.	"Beats to the Rhyme"	Dwayne Simon	Tougher Than Leather (1988)	2:40
6.	"Ooh, Whatcha Gonna Do"	Darryl McDaniels, Joseph Simmons	Down With the King (1993)	3:06
7.	"Dumb Girl"	Darryl McDaniels, Joseph Simmons, Russell Simmons	Raising Hell (1986)	3:33
8.	"Mary, Mary"	Michael Nesmith	Tougher Than Leather (1988)	3:15
9.	"The School of Old" (featuring Kid Rock)	Darryl McDaniels, Joseph Simmons, Russell Simmons, Larry Smith, Brian Potter, Carlos Santana, Chris Davies, David Margen, Dennis Lambert, Greg Walker, Robert James Ritchie	Crown Royal (2001)	3:19
10.	"King of Rock (7" Version)"	Darryl McDaniels, Joseph Simmons, Russell Simmons, Larry Smith, Jason Mizell	King of Rock (1985)	4:39
11.	"Together Forever (Krush-Groove 4)" (Live at Hollis Park 1984)	Darryl McDaniels, Joseph Simmons	Together Forever: Greatest Hits 1983–1991 (1991)	3:34
12.	"My Adidas"	Darryl McDaniels, Joseph Simmons	Raising Hell (1986)	2:47
13.	"Hollis Crew (Krush-Groove 2)"	Darryl McDaniels, Joseph Simmons, Russell Simmons, Larry Smith, Jason Mizell	Run-D.M.C. (1984)	3:12
14.	"Back from Hell (Remix)"	Stanley Brown	Back from Hell (1991)	4:59
15.	"Pause (12" Version)"	Darryl McDaniels, Joseph Simmons, Jason Mizell	Back from Hell (1991)	6:06
Total length:				54:53

=== Disc 2 ===
No.	Title	Writer(s)	Originally from	Length
1.	"Down with the King (7" Version)" (featuring Pete Rock & C.L. Smooth)	Darryl McDaniels, Joseph Simmons, Corey Penn, Peter Phillips, James Rado, Gerome Ragni, Galt MacDermot	Down with the King (1993)	5:02
2.	"Walk This Way (7" Version)" (featuring Aerosmith)	Steven Tyler, Joe Perry	Raising Hell (1986)	3:37
3.	"Christmas in Hollis"	Darryl McDaniels, Joseph Simmons, Jason Mizell	Tougher Than Leather (1988)	2:58
4.	"Hard Times"	Jimmy Bralower, J.B. Moore, Russell Simmons, Larry Smith, William Waring	Run-D.M.C. (1984)	3:52
5.	"Here We Go" (Live at the Funhouse)	Darryl McDaniels, Joseph Simmons	Together Forever: Greatest Hits 1983–1991 (1991)	4:04
6.	"Come On Everybody" (featuring Q-Tip)	Darryl McDaniels, Joseph Simmons, Jonathan Davis	Down with the King (1993)	4:30
7.	"The Ave"	Frank Inglese	Back from Hell (1990)	4:01
8.	"Run's House"	Darryl McDaniels, Joseph Simmons, David Reeves	Tougher Than Leather (1988)	3:46
9.	"It's Tricky"	Darryl McDaniels, Joseph Simmons, Doug Fieger, Berton Averre	Raising Hell (1986)	3:03
10.	"Tougher Than Leather"	Darryl McDaniels, Joseph Simmons, Jason Mizell	Tougher Than Leather (1988)	4:23
11.	"You Talk Too Much (7" Version)"	Darryl McDaniels, Joseph Simmons, Jason Mizell	King of Rock (1985)	3:58
12.	"You Be Illin'"	Darryl McDaniels, Joseph Simmons, Jason Mizell, Raymond White	Raising Hell (1986)	3:26
13.	"It's Like That"	Darryl McDaniels, Joseph Simmons, Larry Smith	Run-D.M.C. (1984)	4:50
14.	"Jam-Master Jammin' (Remix, Long Version)"	Darryl McDaniels, Joseph Simmons, Larry Smith, Jeffrey Fludd	King of Rock (1985)	6:44
Total length:				58:22

== Release history ==
Date	Label	Format
October 30, 2012	Sony Music, Legacy Records	CD, digital download
