= Together Forever: Greatest Hits 1983–1991 =

Greatest hits album by Run-D.M.C.
- Released: November 6, 1991
- Recorded: 1983–1990
- Genre: Hip hop
- Length: 69:35
- Label: Profile
- Producers: Run-D.M.C., various

Run-D.M.C. chronology
| Back from Hell (1990) | Together Forever: Greatest Hits 1983–1991 (1991) | Down with the King (1993) |

Professional ratings
Review scores
| Source | Rating |
|---|---|
| AllMusic | 4.5/5 stars |
| Robert Christgau | (A) |

Together Forever: Greatest Hits 1983–1991 is the first compilation album by American hip hop group Run-D.M.C. It was released in 1991 and was complemented by a greatest hits video collection (released separately). Some pressings included an uncensored version of "Beats to the Rhyme" as heard in the film Tougher Than Leather.

In 1998, due to the success of the Jason Nevins remixes of "It's Like That" and "It's Tricky," the compilation was re-released as Together Forever: Greatest Hits 1983–1998, with the two remixes added to the compilation outside of the United States.

== Track listing ==
| No. | Title | Writer(s) | Length |
|---|---|---|---|
| 1. | "Sucker M.C.'s (Krush Groove 1)" | L. Smith, J. Simmons, D. McDaniels | 3:11 |
| 2. | "Walk This Way" (feat. Aerosmith) | S. Tyler, J. Perry | 5:11 |
| 3. | "Together Forever (Krush Groove 4)" (live at Hollis Park 1984) | J. Simmons, D. McDaniels | 3:34 |
| 4. | "King of Rock" | L. Smith, J. Simmons, D. McDaniels | 5:14 |
| 5. | "Run's House" | D. McDaniels, J. Simmons, J. Mizell, D. Reeves | 3:45 |
| 6. | "It's Tricky" | J. Simmons, D. McDaniels, J. Mizell, R. Rubin | 3:04 |
| 7. | "Pause" | J. Mizell, J. Simmons, D. McDaniels, D. Reeves, S. Brown | 4:38 |
| 8. | "You Be Illin'" | J. Simmons, J. Mizell, R. White | 3:26 |
| 9. | "My Adidas" | J. Simmons, D. McDaniels, R. Rubin | 2:49 |
| 10. | "Here We Go" (Live at the Fun House) | J. Simmons, D. McDaniels | 4:06 |
| 11. | "Rock Box" | L. Smith, J. Simmons, D. McDaniels | 5:32 |
| 12. | "The Ave." | J. Mizell, F. Inglese, J. Simmons, D. McDaniels | 4:06 |
| 13. | "Hard Times" | J. Simmons, L. Smith, W. Warring, D. McDaniels | 3:53 |
| 14. | "Beats to the Rhyme" | D. McDaniels, J. Simmons, D. Reeves, D. Simon | 2:42 |
| 15. | "Jam-Master Jay" | J. Mizell, D. McDaniels, J. Simmons, R. Simmons, L. Smith | 3:12 |
| 16. | "Peter Piper" | J. Simmons, D. McDaniels | 3:23 |
| 17. | "It's Like That" | L. Smith, J. Simmons, D. McDaniels | 4:51 |
| 18. | "Christmas in Hollis" | J. Simmons, D. McDaniels, J. Mizell | 2:57 |

== Songs ==
- "Sucker M.C.'s (Krush Groove 1)" (1983), "Rock Box" (1984), "Hard Times" (1983), "Jam-Master Jay" (1983) and "It's Like That" (1983) are taken from Run–D.M.C. (1984).
- "Here We Go" (Live at the Fun House)" (recorded 1983) is taken from the various artists compilation Rap 2 (1985).
- "King of Rock", is taken from King of Rock (1985).
- "Together Forever (Krush Groove 4)" (live at Hollis Park 1984) is the b-side to "Can You Rock It Like This" (1985).
- "Walk This Way", "It's Tricky", "You Be Illin'", "My Adidas" and "Peter Piper" are taken from Raising Hell (1986).
- "Christmas in Hollis" is a single taken from the various artists compilation A Very Special Christmas (1987).
- "Run's House" and "Beats to the Rhyme" are taken from Tougher Than Leather (1988).
- "Pause" (1989) and "The Ave." (1990) are taken from Back from Hell (1990).

== Chart positions ==
| Chart | Peak position |
|---|---|
| UK Albums Chart | 31 |
| US Billboard 200 | 199 |
| US Billboard Top R&B/Hip-Hop Albums | 75 |
