= Live at Montreux 2001 =

Live album by Run-D.M.C.
- Released: April 3, 2007
- Recorded: July 21, 2001
- Genre: Hip-hop
- Label: Eagle Records
- Producer: Run-D.M.C.

Run-D.M.C. chronology
Crown Royal (2001)	Live at Montreux 2001 (2007)

Professional ratings
Review scores
Source	Rating
AllMusic	3/5 stars

Live at Montreux 2001 is the first live album by American hip-hop group Run-D.M.C. Officially released on April 3, 2007 through Eagle Records, it was produced and mixed by Jam Master Jay. The concert was performed on July 21, 2001 in Montreux, Switzerland.

Musically, the album features aggressive takes on the group's catalog of greatest hits, with the performances filled with banter with the crowd and various call-and-response antics.

== Track listing ==
1. "Intro"
2. "It's Like That"
3. "It's Tricky"
4. "Medley: Rock Box / Sucker M.C.'s / Freestyle / Here We Go / Beats to the Rhyme"
5. "King of Rock"
6. "Interlude"
7. "Mary, Mary"
8. "Walk This Way" (feat. Aerosmith)
9. "School of Old"
10. "It's Over"
11. "Run's Freestyle"
12. "Peter Piper"
13. "Down with the King"

== Reviews and response ==
Music critic David Jeffries praised the album for the publication AllMusic. He wrote, "Live at Montreux 2001 is an exciting and generally satisfying release, filled with life, energy, and inspiration." Remarking that "[g]olden-age material is the name of the game", he stated that the group's antics make it ideal for "hardcore fans", particularly with "the drama-building intro" going "past the four-minute mark without trying the patience".

== See also ==
- Golden age hip-hop
- Run-D.M.C. discography
