= Hard Times (Run-D.M.C. song) =

Single by Run–D.M.C.

from the album Run–D.M.C.
- B-side: "Jam-Master Jay"
- Released: December 11, 1983
- Recorded: 1983
- Genre: New school hip hop
- Length: 3:52
- Label: Profile; Arista
- Songwriters: Jimmy Bralower; J.B. Moore; Russell Simmons; Larry Smith; William Waring
- Producers: Jam Master Jay; Russell Simmons; Larry Smith

Run–D.M.C. singles chronology
"It's Like That" (1983)	"Hard Times" (1983)	"Rock Box" (1984)

"Hard Times" is a song written by Jimmy Bralower, J.B. Moore, Russell Simmons, Larry Smith and William Waring. It was originally recorded by Kurtis Blow for his 1980 eponymous debut album, then the rap group Run–D.M.C. issued a cover of this song as their second single in 1983, which was included as the first track on their eponymous debut album Run–D.M.C..

"Hard Times" rose to No. 11 on Hot R&B/Hip-Hop Songs.

== Background ==
"Hard Times" was originally recorded by Kurtis Blow for his 1980 eponymous debut album. The Run–D.M.C. found the song and decided to make a cover version, through their connection with Blow. Blow and Run's older brother Russell Simmons met in college, and Russell became the rapper's manager, Run working as Blow's DJ. Larry Smith, who produced the Run–D.M.C.'s debut album, played on Blow's original version of the song.

== Composition and reception ==
Billboard described the original as "more funk-oriented than the stripped down Run-D.M.C.'s" version, which shifts focus from melody to a "lurching drum machine pitter patter", a "sole repeated keyboard stab", and "vocals".

The elements of lyrics represent a gangsta rap style, subgenre of rap music, sharing about the "type environment they were living in, and brought a dose of reality to rap". Both Billboard and Grammy that the album was greatly different from other contemporary rap recordings.

== Track listing ==
12" Profile - PRO-7036 (US)

1. "Hard Times" (D. McDaniels, J. Simmons, L. Smith, W. Warring) - 5:10
2. "Jam-Master Jay" (D. McDaniels, J. Mitzell, J. Simmons, L. Smith, R. Simmons) - 3:21
3. "Hard Times (Instrumental)" (D. McDaniels, J. Simmons, L. Smith, W. Warring) - 3:51
4. "Jam-Master Jay (Instrumental)" (D. McDaniels, J. Mitzell, J. Simmons, L. Smith, R. Simmons) - 3:51

== Chart positions ==
Chart (1984)	Peak position
US Billboard Hot Black Singles	11^{1}

Notes:

- ^{1} - Charted with "Jam Master Jay"
