= Eddie Martinez (musician) =

American session musician

- Born: Eddie Paul Martinez; New York, New York, U.S.
- Genres: Rock; funk; disco; jazz
- Occupations: Musician; songwriter; singer
- Instruments: Guitar; vocals
- Label: Cotillion

Eddie Martinez is an American guitarist, born and raised in New York City and of Puerto Rican ancestry, who mainly performs as a session musician.

== Career ==
Martinez's professional music career began in the 1960s and continues today. He has recorded and toured with dozens of musicians representing numerous styles (including rock, jazz, rap, and R&B) but he is probably best known for work he did in the mid-1980s. Martinez said in a 2015 interview, "In the span of less than a year, I did three records that really put me on the map in terms of a sonic direction. Those were: Riptide, Steve Winwood’s Back in the High Life, and then I played on David Lee Roth’s EP Crazy from the Heat, with "California Girls" and "Just a Gigolo".

Also around the same period, Martinez contributed guitars to several tracks on Mick Jagger's first solo album She's the Boss, the 1984 Run-DMC single "Rock Box" and the title track on Run-DMC's groundbreaking 1985 album King of Rock. In addition, Martinez is featured prominently in both the "Rock Box" and the "King of Rock" videos. "Rock Box" is commonly cited as the first rap video played on MTV, whose influence continues to reverberate today. It was one of the six songs chosen for an AMC series Hip Hop: The Songs That Shook America, and Martinez's "distorted guitar sound that runs through the entire "Rock Box" record was one Questlove deemed the sound of the 1980s that connected Prince and Def Leppard to ... LL Cool J ... and Fat Boys’ “Jailhouse Rap.” In a 2015 list of "The Top 10 Uses of Guitar in Hip-Hop," Guitar World ranked Martinez's contribution to "Rock Box" at Number One, saying "Eddie Martinez's searing lead work puts this track from the group's 1984 debut over the top—and ahead of its time."

Other notable sessions include Robert Palmer's 1988 album Heavy Nova, which included the hit "Simply Irresistible", Meat Loaf (Bat Out of Hell II: Back into Hell) and several Jim Steinman projects, plus work with Lou Reed and dozens of others.

While Martinez has made his mark primarily as a recording session guitarist, he has also many years of live credits, including Blondie's Farewell Concert in Toronto, Canada, along with the entire 1982 Tracks Across America tour, and he accompanied Mick Jagger at the first Live Aid concert in 1985. He toured and recorded with Labelle in the 1970s and was part of Robert Palmer's touring band.

In 1984 he released his first solo album, No Lies, on Cotillion Records which was produced by Bernard Edwards of Chic.

== Personal life ==
Martinez currently resides in Portland, Oregon.

== Discography ==
Solo Albums

- No Lies (1984)
- Akosua (2018)

With Labelle

- Chameleon (1976)

With Twennynine

- Best of Friends (1979)

With Kurtis Blow

- Kurtis Blow (1980)

With Run-D.M.C.

- Run-D.M.C. (1984)

With Billy Ocean

- Suddenly (1984)

With Nona Hendryx

- The Art of Defense (1984)

With Kashif

- Send Me Your Love (1984)

With Mick Jagger

- She's the Boss (1985)

With David Lee Roth

- Crazy from the Heat (1985)

With Yoko Ono

- Starpeace (1985)

With Robert Palmer

- Riptide (1985)
- Heavy Nova (1988)
- Don't Explain (1990)

With Joe Cocker

- Cocker (1986)

With Air Supply

- Hearts in Motion (1986)

With Lou Reed

- Mistrial (1986)

With Steve Winwood

- Back in the High Life (1986)

With Jellybean

- Just Visiting This Planet (1987)

With Jody Watley

- Jody Watley (1987)

With Lou Gramm

- Ready or Not (1987)

With Chaka Khan

- ck (1988)

With Rod Stewart

- Out of Order (1988)

With Pandora's Box

- Original Sin (1989)

With Tina Turner

- Foreign Affair (1989)

With Meat Loaf

- Bat Out of Hell II: Back into Hell (1993)
- Welcome to the Neighbourhood (1995)

With Celine Dion

- Falling into You (1996)

With Cher

- Believe (1998)
