= New-school hip-hop =

Movement in hip-hop music

- Stylistic origins: Hip-hop; old-school hip-hop
- Cultural origins: Early-to-mid 1980s, Queens, Brooklyn, New York City
- Typical instruments: turntables; microphone; Roland TR-808

Subgenres
- Golden age hip-hop

Local scenes
- South Bronx, Brooklyn, Hollis, Queens, Jamaica, Queens

Other topics
- Alternative hip-hop; underground hip-hop

The new school of hip-hop was a mid-1980s movement in hip-hop music, led by artists such as Run-DMC, LL Cool J, and the Beastie Boys. Predominantly from Queens and Brooklyn, it was characterized by drum machine-led minimalism, often tinged with elements of rock; rapped taunts, boasts, and socio-political commentary; and aggressive, self-assertive delivery. In song and image, its artists projected a tough, cool, street B-boy attitude. These elements contrasted sharply with Funk and Disco, novelty hits, live bands, synthesizers, and party rhymes of artists prevalent in the early 1980s. Compared to previous artists, new-school artists crafted more cohesive LPs and shorter songs more amenable to airplay. By 1986–87, their releases began to establish hip-hop in the mainstream. This, along with further innovations by artists like Eric B. & Rakim, Public Enemy, and Boogie Down Productions, led into the golden age of hip-hop.

The terms "old school" and "new school" fell into the vernacular as synonyms for "old" and "new" in hip-hop, to the confusion and occasional exasperation of writers who use the terms historically. The phrase "Leader of the New School", coined in hip-hop by Chuck D in 1988, and given further currency by the eponymous group Leaders of the New School (who were named by Chuck D before signing with Elektra in 1989), remains popular. It has been applied to artists ranging from Jay-Z to Lupe Fiasco.

== Background ==
Elements of new school had existed in some form in the popular culture since hip-hop's birth. The first MC's rapped over DJs swapping back and forth between two copies of the same record playing the same drum break, or playing instrumental portions or versions of a broad range of records. This part of the culture was initiated by DJ Kool Herc in 1973 using breaks from James Brown, the Incredible Bongo Band and English rock group Babe Ruth in his block parties. Brown's music—"extensive vamps" in which his voice was "a percussive instrument with frequent rhythmic grunts", and "with rhythm-section patterns ... [resembling] West African polyrhythms"—was a keynote of hip-hop's early days. By 1975, Grandmaster Flash and Afrika Bambaataa had taken up Kool Herc's breakbeat style of DJing, each with their own accompanying rappers. Flash was especially associated with an important break known as "The Bells"—a cut-up of the intro to Bob James's jazz cover of Paul Simon's "Take Me To The Mardi Gras"—while Bambaataa delighted in springing occasional rock music breaks from records like "Mary, Mary", "Honky Tonk Women", "Sgt. Pepper's Lonely Hearts Club Band" and Grand Funk Railroad's "Inside Looking Out" on unsuspecting b-boys.

The earliest hip-hop records replaced the DJ with a live band playing funk and disco influenced tunes, or "interpolating" the tunes themselves, as in "Rapper's Delight" (Sugar Hill, 1979) and "King Tim III (Personality Jock)" (Spring, 1979). It was the soft, futuristic funk closely tied to disco that ruled hip-hop's early days on record, to the exclusion of the hard James Brown beats so beloved of the first b-boys. Figures such as Flash and Bambaataa were involved in some early instances of moving the sound away from that of a live band, as in Flash's DJ track "The Adventures of Grandmaster Flash on the Wheels of Steel" (Sugar Hill, 1981), and even innovating popular new sounds and subgenres, as in the synthesizer-laden electro of Bambaataa's "Planet Rock" (Tommy Boy, 1982). Often though the rawer elements present in live shows did not make it past the recording studio.

Bambaataa's first records, for instance, two versions of "Zulu Nation Throwdown" (Winley, 1980), were recorded with just drums and rhymes. When Bambaataa heard the released records, a complete live band had been added. Something closer to his intentions can be heard on a portion of Death Mix, a low-quality bootleg of a Zulu Nation night at James Monroe High School in the Bronx, released without his permission on Winley Records in 1983. Likewise on the bootleg Live Convention '82 (Disco Wax, 1982), Grand Wizard Theodore cuts the first six bars of Rufus Thomas's "Do the Funky Penguin" together for five and a half minutes while an MC raps over the top. Grandmaster Flash's "Superrappin'" (Enjoy, 1979) had a pumping syncopated rhythm and The Furious Five emulating his spinbacks and needle drops and chanting that "that Flash is on the beatbox going ..." The beatbox itself however, a drum machine which Flash had added to his turntable set-up some time earlier, was absent on the record, the drums being produced by a live drummer.

Kool Moe Dee's verbal personal attacks on Busy Bee Starski live at Harlem World in 1982 caused a popular sensation in hip-hop circles. In the same way, groups like the Cold Crush Brothers and The Force MCs were known for their routines, competitive attitude, and battle rhymes. Tapes of battles like these circulated widely, even without them becoming viable recordings. Apart from some social commentary like Melle Mel's one verse on "Superrappin'", Kurtis Blow's ruefully comedic "The Breaks" (Mercury, 1980) and a spurt of records following the success of Grandmaster Flash and the Furious Five's "The Message" (Sugar Hill, 1982), the old school specialized lyrically in party rhymes.

== Notable artists ==
"I Can't Live Without My Radio"
LL Cool J's second single for the Def Jam label, features heavy beats and boasting raps, reflective of new school and ghetto-blaster culture.

One time, in probably 1983, I was in the park in Brooklyn. I was getting beat up by about eight kids, I don't even remember why. But as it was happening, this dude was walkin' by with one of those big boom boxes. And as he's walking by, we hear [imitates the unmistakable intro drum pattern from Run-D.M.C.'s 'Sucker MCs', loudly]. They all stopped beating me, and we all just stood there, listening to this phenomenon. I could have run, but I didn't, I was just so entranced by what I heard. Then the dude with the box passed by and the kids continued to beat me up. But it didn't matter. I felt good. I knew right then that I had to get into this hip-hop shit.

— Pras of the Fugees, 2003, as told to Brian Coleman, Check The Technique 2nd. ed., New York: Villard, 2007

David Toop writes of 1984 that "pundits were writing obituaries for hip-hop, a passing fad" which "Hollywood had mutated into an all-singing, all-dancing romance" in movies like Flashdance and Breakin'. Against this, Run-DMC, the Beastie Boys, and the label Def Jam were "consciously hardcore", "a reaction against the populist trend in hip-hop at the time", and "an explosive emergence of an underground alternative". For Peter Shapiro, Run-DMC's 1983 two-song release "It's Like That"/"Sucker M.C.'s" "completely changed hip-hop" "rendering everything that preceded it distinctly old school with one fell swoop." In a 47-point timeline of hip-hop and its antecedents spanning 64 years, Shapiro lists this release as his 43rd point. Reviewing Toop's book in the LA Weekly, Oliver Wang of Soul Sides concurs, hailing Run-DMC as inaugurating the new school of rap.

=== Run-DMC ===
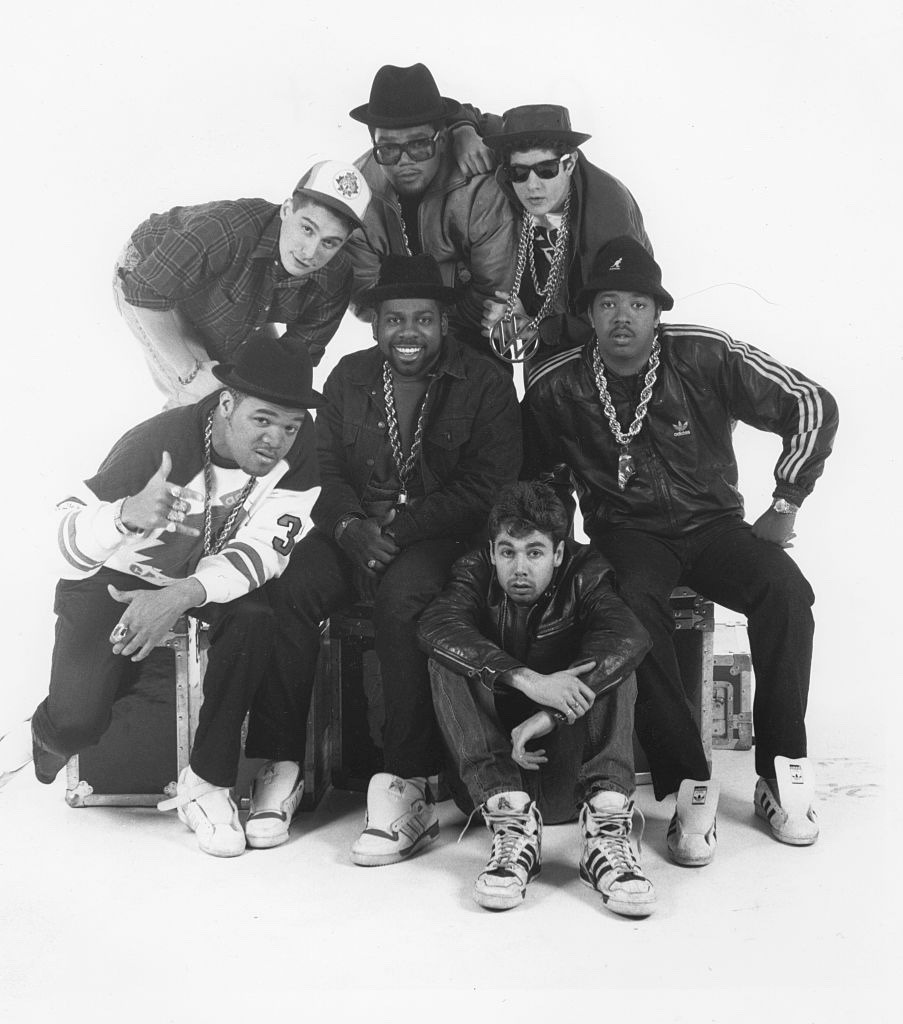
Run-DMC and Beastie Boys (with DJ Hurricane) in 1987. Both were significant artists in the new-school era.

Run-DMC rapped over the most sparse of musical backing tracks. In the case of "Sucker M.C.'s", there was a loud, Oberheim DMX drum machine, a few scratches and nothing else, while the rhymes harangued weak rappers and contrasted them to the group's success. "It's Like That" was an aggressively delivered message rap whose social commentary has been defined variously as "objective fatalism", "frustrated and renunciatory", and just plain "reportage". Run-DMC wore street clothes, tracksuits, sneakers, one even wore glasses. Their only possible concession to an image extraneous to that of kids on the street was the stylistic flourish of black fedoras atop their heads. This stood in sharp contrast to the popular artists of the time, who had variously bedecked themselves with feathers, suede boots, jerri curls, and red or even pink leather suits.

The group's early singles are collected on their eponymous debut (Profile, 1984), introducing rock references in "Rock Box", and recognized then and now as the best album of hip-hop's early years. The next year, they appeared at Live Aid and released King of Rock (Profile, 1985), on which they asserted that they were "never ever old school". Raising Hell (Profile, 1986) was a landmark, containing quintessentially hip-hop tracks like "Peter Piper", "Perfection" and "It's Tricky", and going platinum in the year of its release on the back of the huge crossover hit "Walk This Way". The group had rapped over the beat from the 1975 original in their early days, without so much as knowing the name of the band. When Raising Hell's producer Rick Rubin heard them playing around with it in the studio, he suggested using the Aerosmith lyrics, and the collaboration between the two groups came about. The album's last track was "Proud To Be Black", written under the influence of Chuck D of the as-yet unrecorded Public Enemy. On "My Adidas" the band rapped that they "took the beat from the street and put it on TV".

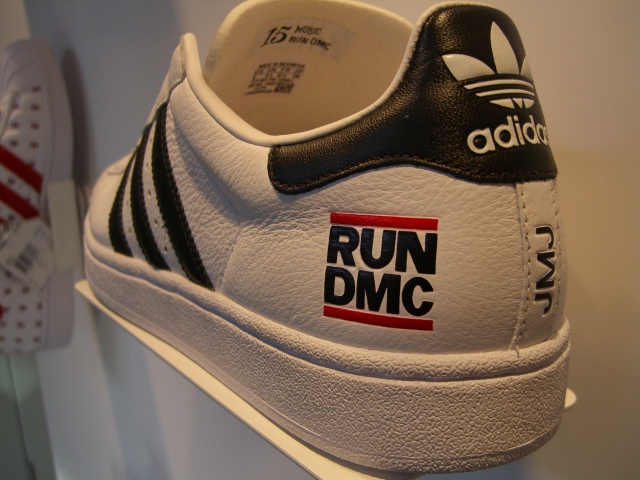
This Run-DMC-branded Adidas running shoe illustrates the increasing market power of rappers, who became a valuable brand.

Comments from Darryl McDaniels, aka DMC of Run-DMC, make this connection to the underground explicit: "[T]hat's exactly what we did. We didn't really think it was pioneering, we just did what rappers did before us was doing on tapes. When a lot of the old guys, like Kool Moe Dee, the Treacherous Three, and Grandmaster Flash, got in the studio, they never put their greatness on records. Me and Run and Jay would listen ... and we'd say, 'They didn't do that shit last night in the Bronx!' ... So we said that we weren't going to be fake. We ain't gonna wear no costumes. We're gonna keep it real."

=== Whodini ===
Coming out of the fertile New York rap scene of the early 1980s, Whodini was one of the first rap groups to add a R&B twist to their music, thus laying the foundation for a new genre, new jack swing. The group made its name with good-humored songs such as "Magic's Wand" (the first rap song accompanied by a video), "The Haunted House of Rock", "Friends", "Five Minutes of Funk", and "Freaks Come Out at Night". Live performances of the group were the first rap concerts with the participation of breakdance dancers from the group UTFO. Russell Simmons was the manager of the group in the 1980s.

The group released six studio albums. Fourteen of the group's singles hit the Billboard charts. Four of the group's albums were certified Platinum by the RIAA. In 1984, the group released the second album Escape. The entire album was fully produced by Larry Smith. From the laid back groove titled "Five Minutes of Funk" to "Friends", a cynical story of betrayal sampled everywhere from Nas' "If I Ruled the World (Imagine That)" to 2Pac's "Troublesome '96", to harder edged singles "Freaks Come Out at Nite" and "Big Mouth".

In 1986, the group released a third album Back in Black, fully produced by Smith. A number of songs from the album received heavy local New York airplay, such as "Funky Beat" and the controversial "I'm a Ho". "Fugitive" was guitar-driven funk and "Last Night (I Had a Long Talk With...)" was introspective. Paul Kodish, the drummer of Pendulum, was featured on the album.

=== Def Jam ===
The other production credit on Raising Hell went to Run's brother, Russell Simmons; he ran Rush Artist Management, now Rush Communications, which as well as handling Run-DMC, managed the Beastie Boys, LL Cool J, Whodini and Public Enemy. Simmons also co-owned Def Jam Recordings, an important new-school label, with Rubin. Simmons rose with Def Jam to become one of the biggest moguls in rap, while Rubin claimed credit for introducing radio-friendly brevity and song structure to hip-hop. Def Jam's first 12-inch release was the minimalist drum machine breakdown "I Need A Beat" by LL Cool J (1984). This was followed by "I Can't Live Without My Radio" (Def Jam, 1985), a loud, defiant declaration of public loyalty to his boom box which the New York Times in 1987 called "quintessential rap in its directness, immediacy and assertion of self". Both were on his debut album for Def Jam, 1985's Radio (described as "Reduced by Rick Rubin" in its liner notes), which also contained the minimalist and rock-influenced track "Rock the Bells".

=== Beastie Boys ===
Rubin also produced music for Beastie Boys, who sampled AC/DC on their Rock Hard EP on Def Jam in 1984 and recorded a Run-DMC outtake and a heavy metal parody on their hugely commercially successful debut album Licensed To Ill (Def Jam, 1986). In 1987, Raising Hell surpassed three million units sold, and Licensed to Ill five million. Faced with figures like these, major labels finally began buying into independent New York hip-hop imprints.

== Further development ==
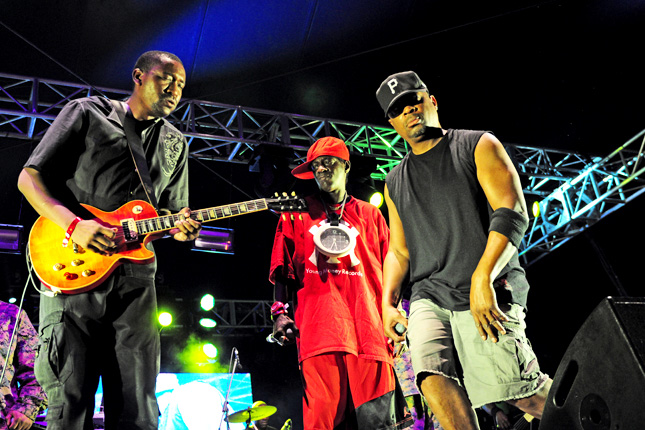
Public Enemy performing in 2011

By the late 1980s, the new-school movement had given way to golden age hip-hop, It was associated with artists such as Public Enemy, KRS-One and his Boogie Down Productions, Eric B. & Rakim, Ultramagnetic MCs, De La Soul, A Tribe Called Quest, and the Jungle Brothers, known for themes of Afrocentricity and political militancy, experimental music, and eclectic sampling. This period is sometimes referred to as "Mid-school" or "middle school"; associated acts included Gang Starr, the UMC's, Main Source, Lord Finesse, EPMD, Just Ice, Stetsasonic, True Mathematics, and Mantronix.

The innovations of Run-DMC, MC Shan, the Beastie Boys, and LL Cool J, and New School Producers such as Larry Smith and Rick Rubin of Def Jam, were quickly surpassed by Marley Marl and his Juice Crew MCs, Boogie Down Productions, Public Enemy, and Eric B. & Rakim. Hip-hop production became denser, and the rhymes and beats faster, as the drum machine was augmented with sampler technology. Rakim took lyrics about the art of rapping to new heights, while KRS-One and Chuck D pushed "message rap" towards black activism. Native Tongues artists' inclusive, sample-crowded music accompanied their positivity, Afrocentricity, and playful energy. The early-mid 1990s saw the commercial dominance of West Coast gangsta rap, particularly G-funk, while the East Coast scene became dominated by hardcore rappers like the Wu-Tang Clan and gangsta rappers such as the Notorious B.I.G.
