= Down with the King (album) =

Studio album by Run-DMC
- Released: May 4, 1993
- Recorded: 1992
- Genres: East Coast hip-hop; hardcore rap; jazz rap; gangsta rap
- Length: 49:27
- Label: Profile
- Producers: Run-DMC; Pete Rock; Q-Tip; EPMD; KayGee; Jam Master Jay; the Bomb Squad; Daniel Shulman; Chyskills; Jermaine Dupri; Clifton "Specialist" Dillon

Run-DMC chronology
Back from Hell (1990)	Down with the King (1993)	Crown Royal (2001)

Singles from Down with the King
- 1. "Down with the King" Released: March 2, 1993; 2. "Ooh, Whatcha Gonna Do" Released: June 1993

Down with the King is the sixth studio album by American hip hop group Run-DMC, released on May 4, 1993, by Profile Records. The album was produced by Run-DMC, Pete Rock, Q-Tip, EPMD, KayGee of Naughty by Nature, Jam Master Jay, the Bomb Squad, Daniel Shulman, Chyskills, Jermaine Dupri and Clifton "Specialist" Dillon.

Showcasing their evolving style, this innovative album boasted invited guests, including reggae star Mad Cobra and Rage Against the Machine guitarist Tom Morello. The album features guest appearances from rappers Pete Rock & C.L. Smooth, Q-Tip, EPMD and Onyx. Down with the King was generally received more favorably by fans and critics than the group's previous album, Back from Hell.

Thanks to the title track, the album was certified Gold by the RIAA after only two months, July 20, 1993. Down with the King peaked at number 7 on the US Billboard 200, and number 1 on the Top R&B/Hip Hop Albums chart.

The album features three Billboard singles: "Down with the King", "Ooh, Whatcha Gonna Do" and "Can I Get It, Yo". The title track also hit the UK Singles Chart.

The album was reissued by Arista Records in 1999 and 2003.

== Background ==
With the release of the new album, Run-DMC created a new look: All black Walker Wear outfits, black Timberlands and bald heads. DMC replaced traditional glasses with contact lenses and began to wear around his neck a large black wooden cross. Run started wearing sunglasses. Jay began to wear a designer ski hat by April Walker to cover his own bald head.

The album was recorded and mixed at 9 studios in New York City and at 1 studio in Atlanta ("Can I Get A Witness").

== Critical response ==
Professional ratings
Review scores
Source	Rating
AllMusic	3/5 stars
Calgary Herald	B+
Christgau's Consumer Guide	B+
Entertainment Weekly	B
Los Angeles Times	3/4 stars
NME	6/10
Q	3/5 stars
RapReviews	7/10
Rolling Stone	3.5/5 stars
Select	3/5
The Source	3.5/5

The album received positive reviews. Jason Lymangrover from AllMusic said "The new sound is decidedly more fashionable, and their fedoras and Adidas are abandoned here for bald heads and baggy black hoodies to match their new gangsta musical direction; which takes an obvious cue from Onyx (signed to Jam Master Jay's label), whose "Slam" was a platinum hit earlier in 1993."

Rolling Stone gave Down with the King three and a half stars out of five, saying "...straight-faced and ultraconfident, funky and forthright...[the album has] the same infectious enthusiasm and the same in-your-face attitude as Run-D.M.C.'s raw earlier classics..."

Entertainment Weekly gave the album "B", saying "...they still manage to sound young, lean, and hungry after 10 years in the rap game...."

Gil Griffin from The Washington Post praised the album by saying:

On "In the House", Run and D.M.C. rap references to their old hits, including "My Adidas", while the rock guitar-powered "Big Willie" makes one long for the power chords and tag-team shouts of 1985's classic cut "King of Rock". But looking forward and taking a cue from Naughty by Nature, Run often raps in a style and speed similar to that group's Treach, with D.M.C. joining him to shout the choruses of "Come On Everybody" and "Can I Get It, Yo", something young hip-hoppers from Das EFX to Fu-Schnickens are doing. And the tempo and chorus of "3 in the Head" make it a dead ringer for the Cypress Hill song "Hand on the Pump". Be it mimicry or tribute to the current hip-hop styles, "Down With the King" boasts expert production, and its consistently up-tempo pace makes it the perfect soundtrack for summer parties".

== Videos ==
Two video clips were released on songs from the album: "Down with the King" and "Ooh, Whatcha Gonna Do". The video on the title track, which was directed by Marcus Raboy, many other rappers made cameos, including Eazy-E, Redman, Kris Kross, Jermaine Dupri, Onyx, Salt-N-Pepa, KRS-One, EPMD, A Tribe Called Quest, De La Soul, MC Lyte, Kid Capri, Das EFX, P.M. Dawn and Naughty by Nature. Onyx also appeared in the video for the song "Ooh, Whatcha Gonna Do". The video was produced by Drew Stone.

== Track listing ==
#	Title	Featuring	Producer(s)	Samples	Length
1	"Down with the King"	Pete Rock & C.L. Smooth	Pete Rock	The Original Broadway Cast of Hair (James Rado, Gerome Ragni and Galt MacDermot) – "Where Do I Go?" (1968); Run-D.M.C. – "Run's House" (1988); Run-D.M.C. – "Sucker M.C.'s (Krush Groove 1)" (1983)	5:00
2	"Come On Everybody"	Q-Tip	Q-Tip	Lonnie Smith – "Spinning Wheel" (1970); Billy Squier – "The Big Beat" (1980); A Tribe Called Quest – "Scenario (Remix)" (feat. Leaders of the New School and Kid Hood) (1992)	4:30
3	"Can I Get It, Yo"	EPMD	EPMD; Mr. Bozack (co-producer)	Manzel – "Midnight Theme" (1979); Kurtis Blow – "AJ Scratch" (1984); Run-D.M.C. – "Hit It Run" (1986)	3:30
4	"Hit 'Em Hard"		KayGee	Billy Squier – "The Big Beat" (1980); Naughty by Nature – "Uptown Anthem" (1991); Run-D.M.C. – "Rock Box" (1984)	2:52
5	"To the Maker"		Jam Master Jay		0:24
6	"3 in the Head"		The Bomb Squad	Lou Donaldson – "Donkey Walk" (1970); Audio Two – "Top Billin'" (1987)	3:29
7	"Ooh, Whatcha Gonna Do"		The Bomb Squad	Maceo & the Macks – "Soul Power 74" (1974); Ramsey Lewis – "The Look of Love" (1967)	3:06
8	"Big Willie"	Tom Morello	Daniel Shulman and Run-D.M.C.	A Tribe Called Quest – "Check the Rhime" (1991); Blood, Sweat & Tears – "Spinning Wheel" (1968)	4:28
9	"Three Little Indians"		Jam Master Jay, Randy Allen, and Chyskills	Run-D.M.C. – "Here We Go (Live at the Funhouse)" (1985); Kurtis Blow – "AJ Scratch" (1984); Public Enemy – "Public Enemy No. 1" (1987); Run-D.M.C. – "Jam Master Jay" (1984)	3:07
10	"In the House"		Pete Rock	Sly & the Family Stone – "Sing a Simple Song" (1968); Run-D.M.C. – "King of Rock" (1985)	3:37
11	"Can I Get a Witness"		Jermaine Dupri	LL Cool J – "Going Back to Cali" (1987); Slick Rick – "Lick the Balls" (1988); Manzel – "Midnight Theme" (1979); Fred Wesley and the J.B.'s – "Blow Your Head" (1974); A Tribe Called Quest – "Can I Kick It?" (1990); Run-D.M.C. – "My Adidas" (1986)	3:36
12	"Get Open"	Onyx	Jam Master Jay and Chyskills	Lonnie Smith – "Turning Point" (1969)	3:52
13	"What's Next"	Mad Cobra	Clifton "Specialist" Dillon		4:03
14	"Wreck Shop"		Pete Rock	Tenor Saw – "Ring the Alarm" (1985); Reggie Stepper – "Drum Pan Sound" (1990); Lou Donaldson – "Who's Making Love" (1969); Melvin Bliss – "Synthetic Substitution" (1973)	3:14
15	"For 10 Years"		Jam Master Jay	Lonnie Smith – "Spinning Wheel" (1970)	0:39

== Charts ==
=== Weekly charts ===
Chart (1993)	Peak position
US Billboard 200	7
US Top R&B/Hip-Hop Albums (Billboard)	1
UK Albums Chart	44
Canadian RPM Albums Chart	29

=== Singles ===
Year	Single	Chart positions						
Year	Single	US	US R&B	US Rap	US Dance Sales	US R-mic	CAN	UK
1993	"Down with the King"	21	9	1	12	33	80	69
1993	"Ooh, Whatcha Gonna Do"	–	78	21	31	–	–	–
1993	"Can I Get It, Yo"	–	–	–	23	–	–	–

== Certifications ==
Region	Certification	Certified units/sales
Canada (Music Canada)	Gold	50,000^{^}
United States (RIAA)	Gold	500,000^{^}
^{^} Shipments figures based on certification alone.

== See also ==
- List of Billboard number-one R&B albums of 1993
