= Back from Hell =

Studio album by Run-D.M.C.
- Released: October 16, 1990
- Recorded: 1989–1990
- Studios: Chung King House of Metal, Studio 900
- Genres: Hip hop; new jack swing
- Length: 54:29
- Labels: Profile; Arista (reissue of the album since 1999)
- Producers: Run-D.M.C.; Jam Master Jay

Run-D.M.C. chronology
Tougher Than Leather (1988)	Back from Hell (1990)	Together Forever: Greatest Hits 1983–1991 (1991)

Singles from Back from Hell
- 1. "Pause" Released: July 12, 1989; 2. "What's It All About" Released: September 14, 1990; 3. "Faces" Released: March 11, 1991

Music video
- "Pause" on YouTube

Music video
- "What's It All About" on YouTube

Music video
- "Faces" on YouTube

Music video
- "The Ave." on YouTube

Back from Hell is the fifth studio album by American hip hop group Run-D.M.C., released on October 16, 1990, by Profile Records. The album was produced by the group members.

The album is notable for adopting more of a street attitude than their previous albums as well as using more curse words. The songs "Faces" and "Pause" introduce a new musical style: new jack swing. This album features vocals from Aaron Hall ("Don't Stop") and also Jam Master Jay rapping for the first time ("Faces", "Not Just Another Groove" and "Pause").

The album has sold over 300,000 copies in the United States. Back from Hell peaked at number 81 on the US Billboard 200, and number 16 on the Top R&B/Hip Hop Albums chart. The album features three the Billboard singles: "Pause", "What's It All About" and "Faces". "What's It All About" also hit the UK Singles Chart

The album was reissued by Arista Records in 1999, 2003 and 2018.

== Background ==
Before Run, DMC and Jay went in the studio to begin recording Back from Hell, they were in trouble: Jay owed the IRS nearly $300,000 in state taxes dating back to 1989, Run was struggling to cope with severe depression and DMC became reliant on alcohol to help him overcome his debilitating stage fright, downing as many as 12 40-ounce bottles of malt liquor a day.

== Critical reception ==
Professional ratings
Review scores
Source	Rating
AllMusic	3/5 stars
Christgau’s Consumer Guide	(dud)
Entertainment Weekly	B−
Rolling Stone	2/5 stars
The Source	3.5/5 stars

The album received poor reviews from music critics. Alex Henderson from AllMusic gave Back from Hell three stars out of five, saying "By 1990, Run-D.M.C.'s popularity had decreased dramatically, and the Queens residents had lost a lot of ground to both West Coast gangster rappers like Ice Cube, Ice-T and Compton's Most Wanted. With its fifth album, Back From Hell, Run-D.M.C. set out to regain the support of the hardcore rap audience and pretty much abandoned rock-influenced material in favor of stripped-down, minimalist and consistently street-oriented sounds. Not outstanding but certainly enjoyable, such gritty reflections on urban life as "Livin' in the City," "The Ave." and "Faces" made it clear that Run-D.M.C. was still well worth hearing.

Mark Coleman of Rolling Stone gave the album two stars out of five, saying "Gratuitous obscenities abound on the record, and they sure don't make Run-D.M.C.'s new tales of street violence and urban injustice any more convincing. Brandishing guns and bantering with racist cops, Run and D.M.C. may well be telling it like it is in 1990. But on most of Back From Hell they sound like actors playing out roles rather than artists dramatizing their own lives. DJ Jam Master Jay is at the top of his form, however. The music on Back From Hell is astounding: Jay constructs vivid minisoundtracks from the detritus of pop culture, laying samples on top of samples without overdoing it. Unfortunately, that deep musical backing just throws more emphasis on the words, which can't carry the weight."

== Videos ==
Four video clips were released on songs from the album: "Pause", "What's It All About", "Faces" and "The Ave.". The video for the song "Pause" was released in two versions; the second version contained an introduction from The Afros, a new group of Jam Master Jay, signed to his new label, JMJ Records.

== Track listing ==
#	Title	Co-producer(s)	Samples	Length
1	"Sucker D.J.'s"		Run-D.M.C. - "Sucker M.C.'s (Krush Groove 1)" (1983)	0:50
2	"The Ave."	Frank Inglese	Bar-Kays - "Sang and Dance" (1970); Fat Larry's Band - "Down on the Avenue" (1976); Uncle Louie - "I Like Funky Music" (1979); Fred Wesley and the J.B.'s - "You Can Have Watergate Just Gimme Some Bucks and I'll Be Straight" (1973); Fred Wesley and the J.B.'s - "Same Beat" (1974)	4:00
3	"What's It All About"	Glen E. Friedman; Russell Simmons	The Stone Roses - "Fools Gold" (1989); Johnny Mathis - "Alfie" (1970); Incredible Bongo Band - "Apache" (1973); Run-D.M.C. - "Rock Box" (1984); Public Enemy - "Bring the Noise" (1987); Minor Threat - "In My Eyes" (1981)	4:48
4	"Bob Your Head"	Frank Inglese	James Brown - "Popcorn With a Feeling" (1969); Funkadelic - "Good Old Music" (1970); The Marcels -"Blue Moon" (1961)	3:46
5	"Faces"	Stanley Brown	Dyke & the Blazers - "Let a Woman Be a Woman - Let a Man Be a Man" (1969); Bell Biv DeVoe - "Poison" (1990); James Brown - "Funky President (People It's Bad)" (1974); Funk, Inc. - "Kool Is Back" (1971); Public Enemy - "Yo! Bum Rush the Show" (1987)	4:27
6	"Kick the Frama Lama Lama"		The Stone Roses - "Fools Gold" (1989)	3:07
7	"Pause"	Davy D Stanley Brown	T La Rock and Jazzy Jay - "It's Yours" (1984); Bob James - "Take Me to the Mardi Gras" (1975); Juice - "Catch a Groove" (1976)	4:38
8	"Word Is Born"	Tony Battaglia (guitar)	Dennis Coffey and the Detroit Guitar Band - "Scorpio" (1971); The Soul Children feat. Jesse Jackson - "I Don't Know What This World Is Coming To" (1972); Eric B. & Rakim - "I Know You Got Soul" (1987); Kurtis Blow - "AJ Scratch" (1984)	2:54
9	"Back from Hell"	Larry Smith	The Honey Drippers - "Impeach the President" (1973); James Brown - "Escape-Ism" (1971); Run-D.M.C. - "Raising Hell" (1986); Public Enemy - "Don't Believe the Hype" (1988)	3:00
10	"Don't Stop"	Stanley Brown; Aaron Hall (vocals)	John Davis and the Monster Orchestra - "I Can't Stop" (1976); Run-D.M.C. - "Beats to the Rhyme" (1987)	4:36
11	"Groove to the Sound"	David Reeves	Grace Jones - "Pull Up to the Bumper" (1981); Bob James - "Take Me to the Mardi Gras" (1975)	3:34
12	"P Upon a Tree"			0:44
13	"Naughty"		Syl Johnson - "Different Strokes" (1967); James Brown - "Say It Loud, I'm Black and I'm Proud" (1968); Rick Jones - "Bang on a Drum" (1973); Tom Jones - "Looking Out My Window" (1968)	4:08
14	"Livin' in the City"			1:03
15	"Not Just Another Groove"	Stanley Brown; Johnny Mc Dowell (vocals)	Trouble Funk - "Pump Me Up" (1982); James Brown - "Funky President (People It's Bad)" (1974)	4:20
16	"Party Time"	David Reeves		4:34

== Chart positions ==
=== Album ===
Chart (1990)	Peak position
US Billboard 200	81
US Top R&B/Hip-Hop Albums (Billboard)	16

=== Singles ===
Year	Single	Chart positions			
Year	Single	US R&B	US Rap	US Dance Sales	UK
1989	"Pause"^{1}	51	11	50	—
1991	"What's It All About"	24	4	—	48
1991	"Faces"	57	13	—	—

Notes

- ^{1} - "Pause" charted as a Double A-side with "Ghostbusters"
