= Rock Box =

Single by Run-DMC

from the album Run-D.M.C.
- Released: March 1984
- Studio: Greene St. Recording
- Genre: Hip hop; rap rock; rap metal
- Length: 5:30
- Label: Profile
- Composers: Larry Smith; Joseph Simmons; Darryl McDaniels
- Producers: Russell Simmons; Larry Smith

Run-DMC singles chronology
"Hard Times" (1983)	"Rock Box" (1984)	"30 Days" (1984)

Music video
- "Rock Box" on YouTube

"Rock Box" is a song by the American hip hop group Run-DMC. The song was produced by Larry Smith and Russell Simmons and released by Profile Records in March 1984. Following the popularity of their previous two singles "Hard Times" (1983) and "It's Like That" (1983), Profile Records head suggested to the producers and group that they should attempt to record an album as they already had four songs ready, and releasing a few more would not hurt them. Despite speculating low sales from the label and the group not feeling that hip hop was a genre appropriate for a full-length album, they were given an advance to start recording. This led to Run-DMC members Joseph "Run" Simmons and Darryl "DMC" McDaniels going through their rhyme book to develop new songs, one of which would become "Rock Box".

After having to wait for the heavy metal band Riot to finish their studio time so the group could record new tracks, the group and producers were influenced by their loud guitar sound and attempted to create a guitar based track. After McDaniels and Simmons recorded their rhymes, Smith developed the track, including inviting his friend Eddie Martinez to record layers of guitar solos to match the song. On its completion, McDaniels and Simmons were unhappy with the sound as they assumed it would not be as guitar heavy and Profile Records president Cory Robbins was also not confident with it, feeling that it was "weird". The group gave a version of the song without the rock backing to Kool DJ Red Alert to play on New York radio, but it was Smith's version with the guitar that became the more popular version. "Rock Box" also featured a music video that became the first hip hop song to get regular rotation on the music video channel MTV.

"Rock Box" was released in early March, three weeks prior to the release of the group's self-titled debut album. The song was praised in contemporary reviews receiving praise in magazines such as Creem and Rolling Stone. In the 1984 Pazz & Jop critics poll released by The Village Voice, "Rock Box" tied with Afrika Bambaataa & James Brown's single "Unity" (1984) at seventh place as one of the top singles of the year. Run-DMC would continue their use of rock based tracks on many of the future songs, including "King of Rock" (1985), "Walk This Way" (1986) and "It's Tricky" (1986).

== Background ==
Prior to the release of "Rock Box", Run-D.M.C. released their first single "It's Like That" in March 1983. The song was released by Profile Records, a small New York-based independent music label known for dance music. Journalist and Run-D.M.C. biographer Bill Adler stated that "It's Like That" was a large step away from the previous three and a half years of hip hop which was known for polished and high spirited songs released by Sugar Hill record label. This was followed by a tour where the group opened for funk music bands on the bottom half of double bills. Profile released their second single "Hard Times" backed with "Jam Master Jay" in December 1983 which charted higher on Billboard's "Black Singles" chart than "It's Like That".

After the success of the two singles, Profile Records decided to have Run-D.M.C. make a full-length album for both the group and the label. Profile's president, Cory Robbins, recalled that after the success of "It's Like That" the group should record an album, feeling that it would be just a few songs, and Run-DMC already had four. McDaniels, Joseph and Russell Simmons were originally against recording an album. Robbins told them that they would be making these songs anyway and encouraged them to record, despite knowing that hip hop albums had not really sold well before. Profile gave them a $25,000 advance for the album with fifteen thousand going towards recording and the remaining 10,000 being split between Smith, McDaniels, Russell and Joseph Simmons. Whether Jay Mizell (Jam Master Jay) was paid for the record remains unknown.

=== Recording ===
Joseph Simmons would tell McDaniels to write about a particular subject which led him to fill his notebook with rhymes. Russel Simmons and Larry Smith would go over lyrics deciding which ones to use, with McDaniels stating that both would "pass over any references to violence, guns, and shit like that." McDaniels stated that Joseph Simmons and himself wanted to created "beat jams; we wanted to rhyme over the break beats that the DJs like Grandmaster Flash, Grand Wizzard Theodore, Charlie Chase, and Tony Tone were dropping on those cassette tapes before records were made." Initially for "Rock Box", McDaniels was interested in using Billy Squier's "The Big Beat" (1980) as the backing music. Smith had McDaniels use his DMX drum machine to lay out the beat which McDaniels changed a bit as he "didn't want to bite a sample". The song predominantly uses the DMX drum machine while the rest of the track used a real bass, guitar, tambourines and cowbells and keyboards. Smith, who played the bass on the track, brought in his friend, Eddie Martinez, from Hollis, Queens to perform guitar on "Rock Box". McDaniels stated two versions of "Rock Box" were created as Joseph Simmons initially just wanted the beat, the rhymes and a little bit of echo on the track. When Martinez arrived, they played him the rhythm track and recorded one riff, rewound the tape and had Eddie play again which led to multitracking his part, which had him playing the harmony with himself, and the solo.

McDaniels stated he "didn't want the guitar version playing in the hood." and both McDaniels and Joseph Simmons were initially not happy with the rock version. McDaniels soon became more comfortable with the song after his friend named Yogi that lived near him kept "giving [him] all these praises about 'Rock Box,' and I'm looking at him like, 'You like it?'." Joseph Simmons would appreciate the song later in his career, stating it wasn't "King of Rock" (1985) or "Walk This Way" (1986) that helped them the most, it was "Rock Box" that was "the record that took us out of the hood."

== Music and lyrics ==
"Rock Box" has been described as belonging to the hip hop, rap rock and rap metal genres. According to Simmons, Run-DMC had to wait for the heavy metal band Riot to finish their session before entering the recording studio. Simmons declared that after the group saw the guitars they wanted to use some as well. McDaniels stated that the idea for a rock guitar in the song was created by producer Larry Smith. Smith stated that his background was in rock music and that Russell Simmons "didn't care about rock'n'roll. Run didn't want nothin' to do with it." Run-DMC were among the first hip hop releases to use a rock guitar; other notable predecessors' included the Treacherous Three's "Body Rock" from 1980.

Musically, Ira A. Robbins described the songs backing music in the Trouser Press Record Guide as melding a simple bass riff to the "thunderous rhythm tracks" and the "blazing rock guitar". Adler described the lyrics of "Rock Box" as similar to that of their previous song "Sucker M.C.'s" (1983). The lyrics of that song involved disrespecting other rappers and how superior Run-DMCs raps were. Joseph Simmons commented that when writing that song he wanted "nothing but hardcore b-boy, wizard, winning shit. Def b-boy stuff, like we used to do in the parks". In "Rock Box", Joseph Simmons discusses b-boy fashion with lyrics of "Calvin Klein's no friend of mine / Don't want nobody's name on my behind / It's Lee on my leg, sneakers on my feet, D by my side, and Jay with the beat."

== Release ==
Prior to releasing the song, Russell Simmons played the track for Robbins at Profile Records who recalled it "was so weird [...] it just took getting used to. Now it seems so normal, but the first time I heard it was like "What is this", and not necessarily in a good way." "Rock Box" was released in March 1984, three weeks before the release of the studio album Run-D.M.C. on March 27, 1984.

Simmons found that "At first black radio didn't know what the fuck it was. They liked everything else on the album better [...] But they tried it for us, kids called the stations requesting it, and 'Rock Box' became a hit in those markets." McDaniels stated that "black people loved the guitar version more than the hip-hop version." after the song was played by Kool DJ Red Alert in New York's KISS FM. By May 1985, "Rock Box" had sold over 750,000 copies. McDaniels stated it took the release of "Rock Box" and their first album to get public acknowledgement, noting that he would drive down the highway after the release and a car of young women who drive next to him and scream excitedly recognizing him from Run-DMC.

A version titled "Rock Box (B-Boy Mix)" recorded on January 10, 1984, was released on a deluxe version of the album Run-D.M.C. in 2005.

== Music video ==
The music video for "Rock Box" was directed by Steve Kahn. The video was budgeted at 27,000 dollars and was the first music video by the group and the Profile label. The video begins in with an introduction by Professor Irwin Corey, a comedian billed as "The World’s Foremost Authority" who humorously compares hip hop and other music until McDaniels and Joseph Simmons arrive in a limousine. The group arrives and begin performing "Rock Box" as their vehicle stops at the Danceteria, a then popular downtown rock club in New York. Throughout the video the group is being watched admiringly by a young boy. McDaniels recalled the making of the "Rock Box" video as "weird. We weren't into it. It was just something we were told to do. And the director had the idea to have some little boy chasing after Run-DMC, to show that we had appeal to the younger generation. A little white boy, too."

Run-DMC were the first rappers to get significant support from MTV as the video became the first hip hop music video to be in regular rotation on the channel. McDaniels recalled in 2011 that when "Rock Box" was shown on MTV, the staff at Profile Records were very excited, while at the time the group were unfamiliar with the network and were more interested in getting videos on the New York based public access television shows New York Hot Tracks and Video Music Box. Joseph Simmons echoed the statement, recalling that the group "didn't know what MTV was, [...] but everyone was jumping around us like it was a big breakthrough. So we jumped with them." Ann Carli, who worked with promotional material for artists at Jive Records, stated that Run-DMC's videos were played by MTV initially as the network felt Run-DMC "weren't threatening: they dressed like cartoon characters, in the hats and the jackets [...] a lot of their videos had a cartoon quality, and that was an easier fit for MTV." The music video is shown again in a fictional Museum of Rock and Roll in the group's music video for "King of Rock" (1985).

== Reception ==
Bill Adler described "Rock Box"'s reception as being loved by rock music critics. Roy Trakin praised the song in Creem, calling it "a searing rap rocker" and that the guitar solo by Martinez "does for hip-hop what Eddie Van Halen did for Michael Jackson - bringing it to a whole new audience." On reviewing their debut album in August 1984, Debby Miller of Rolling Stone noted that Run-DMC style of "Trading off lines or even the words within a line, they get into a vocal tug of war that’s completely different from the straightforward delivery of the Furious Five's Melle Mel or the every-body-takes-a-verse approach of groups like Sequence." and noted that varied musical approach of their songs including "Rock Box" which "set their clipped, back-and-forth exchanges to a crying hard-rock guitar solo, melting rap into rock lite it's never been done before." A reviewer credited as "Push" declared in Soundcheck that was "a superbly orchestrated collision of funk and ripping guitar" Reviewing a Run-DMC concert at the Danceteria, Richard Grable wrote in the 26 May 1984 issue of the NME ""Rock Box" is a stroke — the first guitar-fuelled beat box spawn of "Beat It" (1982) to mean anything." In the 1984 Pazz & Jop critics poll released by The Village Voice, "Rock Box" tied with Afrika Bambaataa & James Brown's single "Unity" (1984) at seventh place as one of the top singles of the year.

From retrospective reviews, Robbins praised the track in the Trouser Press Record Guide, stating "Rock Box" was "The perfect combination — verbal acuity and theatrical drama matched by an inexorable pounding beat and the power of electric guitar" and helped "chip away the barriers that kept "black music" and "white music" segregated all through the '70s." Tom Breihan of Pitchfork referred to the track as "The only real misstep" from their debut album, stating that it "buries a decent banger under layers of unbearable hair-metal guitar wheedling."

== Legacy ==
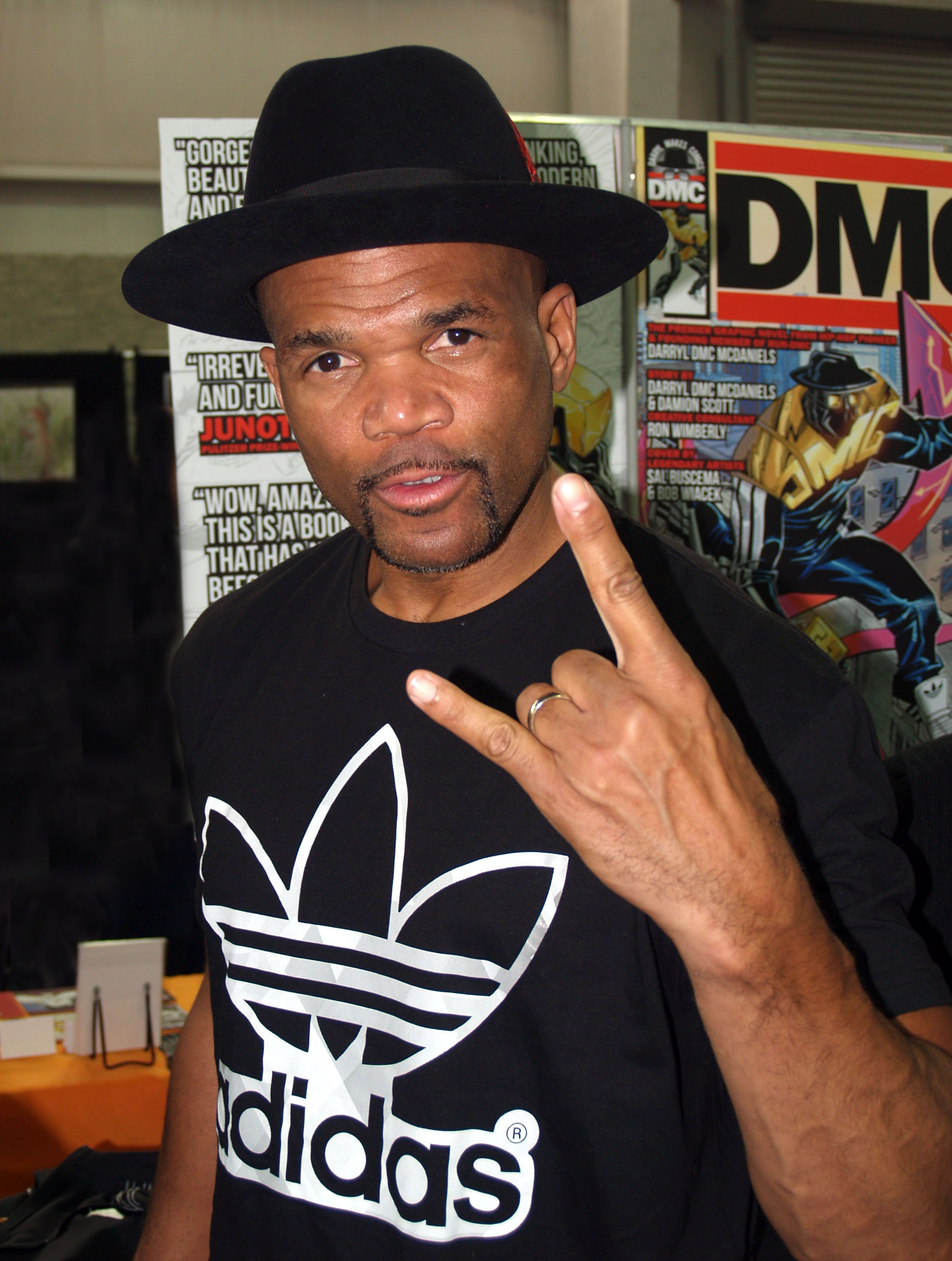
Darryl McDaniels said the release of "Rock Box" and their debut album led to the band's popularity.

Martinez would return to play guitar for the group on "King of Rock" (1985). Steve Pond of the Los Angeles Times described that song as "Rock Box, Part II" and that it was "a conservative move that's paid off in MTV air play". Robbins wrote in the Trouser Press Record Guide that the use of electric guitar on "Rock Box" and "King of Rock" led to directly to the groups other rock based tracks, including "Walk This Way", and the use of The Knack's "My Sharona" (1979) riff on Run-DMC's song "It's Tricky" (1986). Murray Forman wrote in his book The 'Hood Comes First: Race, Space, and Place in Rap and Hip-Hop that the new rock guitar based sound seen in similar song "8 Million Stories" (1984) by Kurtis Blow and "Rock Hard" (1984) by the Beastie Boys and showcased a drift away from the disco-based music of earlier rap music such as the use of Chic's "Good Times" (1979) as used in "Rapper's Delight" (1979). Forman followed up stating this rock oriented sound made hip hop music more accessible to white teenagers and moved hip hop music being performed at discotheques to larger arenas. The song influenced contemporary groups of the period. Ad-Rock of the Beastie Boys stated that the group was inspired by Run-DMC for their first album Licensed to Ill (1986), specifically noting "Rock Box" and "King of Rock" as their inspiration for a hybrid of rock and hip hop. Hip hop group Whodini changed the music they were initially going to have on their album Escape (1984) after hearing "Rock Box". Their album was initially going to have a rock music backing, but the group went with a more R&B influenced sound on the record after hearing "Rock Box".

"Rock Box" was listed among producer Questlove's top hip hop songs of all time in 2012, noting that the song's importance was not about its hybrid of rock and hip hop music, but that before Run-DMC, hip hop groups looked like they were "part of a Broadway production." Questlove declared that America wanted music artists that looked and dressed like they did, and by doing so, "Run-DMC officially ushered in the B-boy period of hip-hop, where the every-man had a chance to escape poverty and invisibility and make it." Questlove concluded that "the single that knocked down many obstacles enabling hip-hop to become the new gospel."

== Track listing ==
12" single (PRO-7045)

1. "Rock Box" – 6:56
2. "Rock Box (Vocal Dub Mix)" – 6:00
3. "Rock Box (Dub Version)" – 7:28

== Credits ==
Credits adapted from the liner notes and expanded with information in the article.

- Larry Smith – producer, composer, bass
- Russell Simmons – producer
- Darryl McDaniels – composer
- Joseph Simmons – composer
- D.J. Starchild – mixing
- Eddie Martinez – electric guitar
