= Larry Smith (producer) =

- Smith in 1983

Background information
- Born: Lawrence Smith; June 11, 1952; New York City, U.S.
- Died: December 19, 2014 (aged 62) New York City, U.S.
- Genre: Hip-hop
- Occupation: Record producer
- Instruments: Bass guitar; Oberheim DMX; Prophet 5; Linn Drum; Roland TR-808
- Years active: 1979–1994

Lawrence Smith (June 11, 1952 – December 19, 2014) was a pioneering American musician and hip-hop record producer. He is best known for his co-productions (with Russell Simmons) of Run-DMC's Run-D.M.C. (1984) and King of Rock (1985) and his solo production of Whodini's Escape (1984) and Back in Black (1986).

It is a measure of Smith's creative range that he could work simultaneously with the decidedly dissimilar Run-D.M.C. and Whodini. The former was rock-oriented, the latter leaned toward contemporary R&B—or as the critic Tom Terrell suggested, "Smith envisioned Whodini as the luxe Cadillac Seville to Run-D.M.C.'s Electra 225 hooptie."

Smith's work has engendered not just critical esteem, but popular success. In the month ending February 23, 1985, both Run-D.M.C. and Escape were certified gold by the RIAA, as was the Fat Boys' eponymous debut studio album, on which Smith played bass guitar and helped to compose the hit single "Jail House Rap." These were among the first hip-hop albums to be certified for Gold-level sales by the Recording Industry Association of America (RIAA).

In 1987 Whodini's John "Ecstasy" Fletcher described Smith as "the Quincy Jones of rap." In 2010 Run-DMC's Darryl "D.M.C." McDaniels claimed, "Larry Smith's musical arsenal equals Dr. Dre's." In 2009, the producer DJ Premier placed Smith first on his list of Top-5 Dead or Alive Producers, ahead of Marley Marl, Kurtis Mantronik, James Brown, and Rick Rubin.

== Early career ==
Larry Smith was born and raised in St. Albans, Queens, New York, and attended Andrew Jackson High School. He taught himself to play bass by listening to James Brown's records. Eventually, Smith did all kinds of session work, played punk-rock, jazz, and blues, then logged stints in the house band of more than one musical.

In 1979, Smith was recruited by his old friend Robert "Rocky" Ford, then an aspiring record producer, to play bass on Kurtis Blow's "Christmas Rappin'." Smith went on to co-write and to play bass on other Blow recordings such as "The Breaks" (one of the first hip hop records to crack into Billboard's Hot 100 singles chart and achieve Gold sales status), "Hard Times," "Tough," "Day Dreamin'," and "The Deuce."

It was while working with Blow that Smith met Blow's manager, Russell Simmons. By 1982, the pair was producing records together, starting with a couple of singles for the rapper Jimmy Spicer: "The Bubble Bunch" (1982) and "Money (Dollar Bill, Y'all)" (1983).

== Making Run-D.M.C. and King of Rock ==
Although Smith was a trained musician, he chose not to employ live studio musicians to provide the music for Run-DMC. Aiming to reproduce on record the spare sound of hip hop music as it was then being made in the city's parks and clubs, he relied instead on drum machines. The result—embodied in Run-DMC's first single, "It's Like That" b/w "Sucker M.C.'s"—was little more than beats and rhymes, a formula that critic Jesse Serwer has described as "the template for most [hip hop] records from '83 until '86–'87".

When Run-DMC's eponymous first album was released in the spring of 1984, it was hailed by Robert Christgau as "easily the canniest and most formally sustained [hip hop] album ever." One of the album's standout tracks was "Rock Box", a pioneering hybrid of hip hop and rock. According to Bill Adler in Tougher Than Leather: The Rise of Run-D.M.C., the record came together when the group overheard the band Riot recording in New York's Greene Street Studios. "They saw these loud guitars," remembers Russell Simmons, "and they started screaming, 'We can do that! What the we're going to make loud noise too!'" Steve Loeb, the owner of Greene Street, was skeptical of the viability of a rock–hip hop crossover, but Smith overruled him and recruited Eddie Martinez—a personal friend of his—to supply the guitar part for "Rock Box".

Run-D.M.C. was named by The Source magazine in 1998 as one of the 100 Best Rap Albums Ever and by Rolling Stone as one of the 100 Greatest Albums of the 1980s. In 2005, critic Tom Breihan described the album as "the LP that forever tore rap away from disco and made it its own thing".

Smith and Simmons's second album for Run-DMC was King of Rock. The title track, which again featured Eddie Martinez on guitar, let the group "crunch and pop like some sort of hip-hop Black Sabbath," in the words of Rolling Stone's J.D. Considine. In recent years, it was featured on the soundtrack of the video games Guitar Hero: Aerosmith and Thrasher: Skate and Destroy. The album also featured the track "Roots, Rap, Reggae", which has been credited by critic Jay Quan as "the first time that a major reggae artist (Yellowman) collaborated with a rap act". King of Rock was certified Platinum in 1987.

== Making Escape ==
In the wake of the success of Run-D.M.C.'s first singles, Smith was engaged to produce a new album by Whodini, a Brooklyn hip hop trio that had been recording for then-London-based Jive Records since 1982. Just as "It's Like That" b/w "Sucker M.C.'s" anchored Run-D.M.C., so Smith's production of the single "Friends" b/w "Five Minutes of Funk" would anchor Whodini's Escape. Ultimately, it reached number four on Billboard's Hot R&B Singles chart.

In a 2009 interview with Jesse Serwer, Whodini's Jalil Hutchins recalled being introduced to Smith at Disco Fever in the Bronx: "Me and Larry became friends, and when we was going to record, we said, 'Lar, what you got?' He laid out his ideas real fast, and the first was 'Five Minutes of Funk.' When we caught that beat, we were like, 'Messing with you is gonna be fun.' We made that record in, like, a half hour."

Escape's other notable single was "Freaks Come out at Night," about which the critic Greg Tate wrote: "[The track's] sybaritic verses would be just so much more overbaked hip hop toasting without Smith's sizzling contrapuntal eruptions arcing and looping in and out of the vocals. Smith and Whodini have laid the groundwork for a genus of hip hop as capable of personal revelation as the blues of Robert Johnson and as worldly wise as the melodic muse of Wayne Shorter." Certified platinum in 1987, Escape was named one of the 100 Best Rap Albums in The Source in 1998.

The critic Vince Aletti, writing for Andy Warhol's Interview magazine in April 1986, summed up the impact of Smith's work for Whodini: "A funky but melodic mix that gives the material the appeal of songs rather than bare-boned rap attacks, these songs have gone on to become hits that helped open ears and airwaves to [hip hop]."

== Personal life ==
Smith married his wife Michelle on his birthday, June 11, 1986. They met in England whilst he was producing Whodini's second album. They married in New York.

In November 2007 Smith suffered a stroke. It left him unable to speak.

He died on December 19, 2014.
