= Run-D.M.C. (album) =

Studio album by Run-D.M.C.
- Released: March 27, 1984
- Recorded: 1983
- Studio: Greene Street Recording (New York City)
- Genres: East Coast hip hop; hardcore hip hop; rap rock
- Length: 39:27
- Labels: Profile; Arista
- Producers: Russell Simmons; Larry Smith

Run-D.M.C. chronology
Run-D.M.C. (1984)	King of Rock (1985)

Singles from Run-D.M.C.
- 1. "It's Like That" Released: August 10, 1983; 2. "Hard Times" Released: December 11, 1983; 3. "Rock Box" Released: April 16, 1984; 4. "30 Days" Released: 1984; 5. "Hollis Crew (Krush Groove 2)" Released: 1984

Run-D.M.C. is the debut studio album by American hip hop group Run-D.M.C., released on March 27, 1984, by Profile Records, and re-issued by Arista Records. The album was primarily produced by Russell Simmons and Larry Smith.

The album was considered groundbreaking for its time, presenting a tougher, more hardcore form of rap. The album's sparse beats and aggressive rhymes were in sharp contrast with the light, party-oriented sound that was popular in contemporary hip hop. With the album, Run-D.M.C. came to be regarded by music critics as pioneering the movement of new school hip hop of the mid-1980s. Five singles were released in support of it: "It's Like That", "Hard Times", "Rock Box", "30 Days" and "Hollis Crew". The first single from the album, "It's Like That", released on August 10, 1983, expanded lyrical boundaries in rap with its tone of social protest (unemployment, inflation). "It's Like That" is considered by many to be the first hardcore hip hop song, and the first new-school hip hop recording. "Sucker M.C.'s" is one of the first diss tracks, and "Rock Box" is the first song in the rap rock genre.

Run-D.M.C. peaked at number 53 on the Billboard 200 chart and number 14 on the Top R&B/Hip Hop Albums chart. The album became the first rap album to achieve a Gold certification from the Recording Industry Association of America (RIAA) (December 17, 1984). It was released to critical acclaim, and continues to be highly regarded as a seminal hip hop album. In 1989, it was ranked number 51 on Rolling Stone's list of the "100 Greatest Albums of the 1980s". In 2003, the album was ranked number 240 on the same magazine's list of the "500 Greatest Albums of All Time", with the ranking changing to numbers 242 and 378 in the 2012 and 2020 updates of the list, respectively. The album was reissued by Arista Records in 1999 and 2003. An expanded and remastered edition was released in 2005 and contained 4 previously unreleased songs.

== Background ==
The music on the album was created by Larry Smith's group Orange Krush using the Oberheim DMX drum machine and Jam Master Jay's scratches mixed in a guitar riff.

The album was dedicated to the memory of DJ June Bug who worked as a DJ in the Bronx at the club Disco Fever, selling drugs at the same time.

== Impact of "Rock Box" ==
Run-D.M.C.'s second listed track, "Rock Box" (which was released as the album's third single on April 16, 1984), is credited by music critics for dissolving social and racial boundaries within the music industry between rock music and mainstream hip hop at the time of the album's release.

The music video for "Rock Box" became the first rap video played on MTV in the summer of 1984. The video was filmed in the famous New York punk club Danceteria. As Run-D.M.C.'s first major video release, the trio represented 1980's New York street fashion with their signature look of black Kangol hats, black Lee jeans, black t-shirts and leather jackets, white Adidas sneakers, gold chains, and, as always, D.M.C. is wearing his trademark glasses. Run-D.M.C. has been credited for evolving African-American fashion, breaking away from the highly glamorous looks of disco and early hip hop.

In a 2019 episode of the AMC docuseries The Songs That Shook America, "Rock Box" was applauded for its blending of snare drum beats accompanied by the guitar riffs performed by American guitarist Eddie Martinez.

By mixing rock and rap, 'Rock Box' redefined both genres. Public Enemy, Beastie Boys, Linkin Park, Rage Against the Machine, and Blink-182, none of them would be the same without this one song, and hip hop and rock might still be segregated art forms. That's its impact.

— Questlove

"Rock Box" would also go on to inspire many of Run-D.M.C.'s future material in the rap-rock genre, including the title track of their second studio album King of Rock (1985), the singles "Walk This Way" and "It's Tricky" from the group's third studio album Raising Hell (1986), and the title track of their fourth studio album Tougher Than Leather (1988).

== Appearance in films ==
The song "It's Like That" was performed on stage in the 1985 Warner Bros. film Krush Groove, in which the Run-D.M.C.'s members starred in April 1985.

== Critical reception and influence ==
Professional ratings
Review scores
Source	Rating
AllMusic	5/5 stars
Chicago Tribune	4/4 stars
Pitchfork	8.1/10
Record Collector	4/5 stars
Rolling Stone	4/5 stars
The Rolling Stone Album Guide	4.5/5 stars
The Source	5/5 stars
Spin Alternative Record Guide	9/10
Uncut	4/5 stars
The Village Voice	A−

Debby Miller of Rolling Stone complimented Run-D.M.C.'s boasts about "messages that self-improvement is the only ticket out" and viewed their style as a departure from most hip hop acts at the time; stating "they get into a vocal tug of war that's completely different from the straightforward delivery of The Furious Five's Melle Mel or the everybody-takes-a-verse approach of groups like Sequence. And the music ... that backs these tracks is surprisingly varied, for all its bare bones".

In his consumer guide for The Village Voice, critic Robert Christgau described it as "easily the canniest and most formally sustained rap album ever, a tour de force I trust will be studied by all manner of creative downtowners and racially enlightened Englishmen". Christgau commented on the group's "heavy staccato and proud disdain for melody", writing that "the style has been in the New York air long enough that you may understand it better than you think".

The album has been regarded by music writers as one of early hip hop's best albums and a landmark release of the new school hip hop movement in the 1980s. According to journalist Peter Shapiro, the album's 1983 double-single release "It's Like That"/"Sucker M.C.'s" "completely changed hip-hop ... rendering everything that preceded it distinctly old school with one fell swoop." Run-D.M.C. rapped over the most sparse of musical backing tracks in hip hop at the time: a drum machine and a few scratches, with rhymes that harangued weak rappers and contrasted them to the group's success. "It's Like That" is an aggressively delivered message rap whose social commentary has been defined variously as "objective fatalism", "frustrated and renunciatory", and just plain "reportage".

In 1989, the album was ranked number 51 on Rolling Stone's list of the 100 Greatest Albums of the 1980s. In 2003, the album was ranked number 240 on Rolling Stone's list of The 500 Greatest Albums of All Time. The album's ranking moved to number 242 in the 2012 version of the list, and to number 378 in the 2020 update.

In 1998, the album was selected as one of The Source's 100 Best Rap Albums.

"It's the first rap album that broke big," observed Ice-T, "which paved the way for everybody into being able to make rap albums, not just singles."

=== Accolades ===
- The Observer – no. 40 at "50 albums that changed music" (2006)
- NME – no. 25 at "101 Albums To Hear Before You Die" (2014)
- Rolling Stone – no. 51 at "100 Best Albums of the Eighties" (1989)
- Rolling Stone – no. 240/242/378 at "500 Greatest Albums of All Time" (2003/2012/2020 editions of the list, respectively)
- Rolling Stone – no. 26 at "100 Best Debut Albums of All Time" (2003)
- Rolling Stone – "The 40 Most Groundbreaking Albums of All Time" (2013)
- Spin – no. 11 at "The 25 Greatest Albums of All Time" (1989)
- Spin – no. 7 at "The Ten Reasons We Wish Spin Had Started In 1984" (2005)
- The Source – "100 Best Rap Albums" (1998)
- The Source – "Albums Rated 5 Mics (Out of 5)" (1998)
- The Source – "100 Best Rap Singles" (1998)
- Beats Per Minute – no. 73 at "The Top 100 Albums of the 1980s" (2011)
- XXL – "40 Years of Hip-Hop: Top 5 Albums by Year" (2014)
- Uncut – no. 33 at "50 Greatest New York Albums" (2015)
- Complex – no. 37 at "The Best Rap Albums of the '80s" (2017)
- Complex – "The Best Hip-Hop Producer Alive, Every Year Since 1979" (2018)
- The Village Voice – no. 10 at "Pazz & Jop: Top 10 Albums By Year, 1971–2017" (2018)
- Pitchfork – no. 41 at "The 100 Best Rap Albums of All Time" (2025)

== Track listing ==
Side one
No.	Title	Writer(s)	Sample(s)	Length
1.	"Hard Times"	Jimmy Bralower; JB Moore; Russell Simmons; Larry Smith; Will Waring		3:52
2.	"Rock Box"	Darryl McDaniels; Joseph Simmons; Smith		5:30
3.	"Jam-Master Jay"	McDaniels; Jason Mizell; J. Simmons	"Scratchin'" by Magic Disco Machine	3:11
4.	"Hollis Crew (Krush-Groove 2)"	McDaniels; Mizell; J. Simmons; R. Simmons		3:12
5.	"Sucker M.C.'s (Krush-Groove 1)"	Nathaniel S. Hardy; Jr., McDaniels; J. Simmons; Smith	"Live at the Disco Fever" by Lovebug Starski	3:09

Side two
No.	Title	Writer(s)	Length
6.	"It's Like That"	McDaniels; J. Simmons; Smith	4:50
7.	"Wake Up"	J. Simmons; Smith; R. Simmons; Daniel Hayden	5:31
8.	"30 Days"	Daniel Simmons; Smith; Moore	5:47
9.	"Jay's Game"	J. Simmons; Smith; Mizell; R. Simmons	4:25

2005 deluxe edition CD bonus tracks
No.	Title	Length
10.	"Rock Box (B-Boy Mix)"	5:52
11.	"Here We Go (Live at the Funhouse)"	4:06
12.	"Sucker M.C.'s (Live at Graffiti Rock)"	3:25
13.	"Russell & Larry Running at the Mouth"	4:37

== Personnel ==
Musicians

- Jam Master Jay – percussion, keyboards
- Darryl McDaniels "D.M.C." – vocals
- Joseph Simmons "Run" or "Rev Run" – vocals
- Eddie Martinez – guitar

Production

- Orange Krush – composer
- Russell Simmons – producer
- Larry Smith – producer
- Rod Hui – producer; engineer
- Erika Klein- assistant engineer

== Charts ==
Chart (1984)	Peak position
US Billboard 200	53
US Top R&B/Hip-Hop Albums (Billboard)	14

== Certifications ==
Region	Certification	Certified units/sales
United States (RIAA)	Gold	500,000^{^}
^{^} Shipments figures based on certification alone.
