= It's Like That (Run-D.M.C. song) =

1983 single by Run-D.M.C.

Single by Run-D.M.C.

from the album Run-D.M.C.
- B-side: "Sucker M.C.'s"
- Released: August 10, 1983
- Genre: Hip-hop
- Length: 4:51 (7-inch); 7:25 (12-inch)
- Label: Profile
- Songwriters: Darryl McDaniels; Joseph Simmons; Larry Smith
- Producers: Russell Simmons; Larry Smith

Run-D.M.C. singles chronology
"It's Like That" (1983)	"Hard Times" (1983)

Alternative release
- 12-inch US retail vinyl release

"It's Like That" is a song by American hip hop group Run-D.M.C., released in 1983 by Profile Records as their debut single. The song was remixed by house DJ Jason Nevins in 1997. His version was originally released in 1997 on 10-inch vinyl in the United States and became a sleeper hit in 1998. It sold around five million copies worldwide, placing it amongst the biggest selling singles of all time. In 2008, it was ranked number 40 on VH1's "100 Greatest Hip-Hop Songs".

== Run-D.M.C. version ==
"It's Like That" was first released in 1983 backed with the track "Sucker M.C.'s". The release marked the start of Run-D.M.C.'s career and is widely regarded as ushering in a new school of hip hop artists with a street image and an abrasive, minimalist sound that marked them out from their predecessors. Both tracks were collected on the trio's eponymous debut album in 1984. "It's Like That" is about life in the area where the group lives (unemployment, prices, death, etc.). Despite protesting those social and political problems, the song takes on a hopeful message encouraging listeners to abandon prejudice and to believe in themselves.

The song would be named by fans one of Run-D.M.C.'s signature songs.

In the re-release of the album in 2004, a booklet was included, and a reviewer, Angus Batey, wrote the background information about the album. When he wrote about "It's Like That", he stated:

[Larry] Smith had created one particularly stark backing track that would provide a perfect setting for rap. He was aware of Run's prowess as a writer, having previously paid the teenager $100 for a set of lyrics with the intention of [Kurtis] Blow recording them. One evening, in Smith's home studio in Queens, Run and D persuaded Larry and Russell [Simmons] to let them have a chance to make a demo. Russell agreed; taking Run's $100 rap and extensive additional lines penned by the prolific DMC, Russell doled it out line by line between the two vocalists, who sprayed their lyrics over the stark beat onto tape. 'It's Like That' became the band's debut single, stridently announcing that a new era began.

The song was mixed by Kurtis Blow and Elai Tubo.

== Track listing ==
All tracks written by Darryl McDaniels, Joe Simmons and Larry Smith.

- 12-inch Profile – PRO-7019 (US)
1. "It's Like That" – 7:25
2. "Sucker M.C.'s (Krush Groove 1)" – 3:15
3. "It's Like That" (Instrumental) – 7:10
4. "Sucker M.C.'s (Krush Groove 1)" (Instrumental) – 3:05

== Charts ==
Weekly chart performance for "It's Like That"
Chart (1983)	Peak position
US Hot R&B/Hip-Hop Songs (Billboard)	15

== Jason Nevins version ==
"It's Like That"

Single by Run-D.M.C. vs. Jason Nevins
- Released: 1997
- Genre: Hip house
- Length: 4:10
- Label: Sm:)e Communications
- Songwriters: Darryl McDaniels; Joseph Simmons; Larry Smith
- Producers: Russell Simmons; Larry Smith; Jason Nevins

Run-D.M.C. singles chronology
"Can I Get It, Yo" (1993)	"It's Like That" (1997)	"(It's) Tricky" (1998)

Music video
- "It's Like That" on YouTube

In 1997, a new version of "It's Like That" by American producer Jason Nevins was released. The Nevins version topped the singles charts in 12 countries, including the United Kingdom, where it stayed at the top for six weeks and became Britain's third biggest-selling single of 1998. In the UK, the Nevins remix gained notoriety for breaking the Spice Girls' run of consecutive number-one hits on the UK Singles Chart, keeping their song "Stop" from claiming the top spot. The Spice Girls sampled the song when performing "Stop" during The Return of the Spice Girls Tour as a nod to the notoriety.

=== Critical reception ===
Larry Flick from Billboard magazine wrote, "The lines dividing rap and dance music are momentarily blurred on this revision of a Run-D.M.C. chestnut. Their rhymes are sewn into a forceful, house-inflected groove by underground club dynamo Nevins, who displays a palpable talent for combining hard-edged flavor with ear-grabbing hooks. Club DJs have already turned this into a dancefloor staple, with crossover radio mix-show programmers also banging it like crazy. It won't be long before folks can hear it during morning-drive hours." Scottish Daily Record praised it as "pure brilliant".

Matt Diehl from Entertainment Weekly gave it an A, commenting, "The combination of Run-D.M.C.'s old-school braggadocio and Nevins' new-school grooves demonstrates how club sounds constantly revitalize themselves, as well as displaying the historical links between seemingly disparate dance-music styles. Most important, it rocks the house." A reviewer from Music Week gave it five out of five and named it Single of the Week, declaring it as a "pounding house update". James Hyman of Record Mirror wrote, "Reviving 'hip house' for the late Nineties with relentless pounding beats, scratchy squeaks and "check this out" punctuation over Run DMC's classic 1983 rap, NY DJ Jason Nevins has created a pan-European club smash which has already been Top 10 in almost the same number of national charts. When it hits UK release on March 9, that will seal it."

=== Music video ===
The accompanying music video for the remix featured male vs. female breakdance crews battling each other. Nevins is in the beginning of the video wearing his 'well known yellow tinted glasses' and holding a boombox.

=== Track listings ===
- US 12-inch single

A1. "It's Like That" (Drop the Break) – 8:20
A2. "It's Like That" (Battle Beat dub) – 4:48
B1. "It's Like That" (Jason's Battle Blaster) – 8:21
B2. "It's Like That" (Acapella Break) – 1:28
B3. "It's Like That" (Bonus Beat Break) – 8:20

- CD maxi; Australian CD single
1. "It's Like That" (Drop the Break – radio edit) – 4:09
2. "It's Like That" (Jason's Battle Blaster) – 8:21
3. "It's Like That" (Drop the Break) – 8:20

=== Charts ===
==== Weekly charts ====
Weekly chart performance for "It's Like That"
Chart (1997–1998)	Peak position
Australia (ARIA)	1
Austria (Ö3 Austria Top 40)	2
Belgium (Ultratop 50 Flanders)	2
Belgium (Ultratop 50 Wallonia)	2
Belgium Dance (Ultratop)	1
Canada (Nielsen SoundScan)	3
Croatia (HRT)	6
Denmark (IFPI)	1
Europe (Eurochart Hot 100)	3
Finland (Suomen virallinen lista)	1
France (SNEP)	14
Germany (GfK)	1
Greece (IFPI)	6
Hungary (Mahasz)	2
Iceland (Íslenski Listinn Topp 40)	1
Ireland (IRMA)	1
Italy (FIMI)	10
Netherlands (Dutch Top 40)	1
Netherlands (Single Top 100)	1
New Zealand (Recorded Music NZ)	1
Norway (VG-lista)	1
Scottish Singles Sales (Official Charts)	1
Sweden (Sverigetopplistan)	1
Switzerland (Schweizer Hitparade)	1
UK Singles (Official Charts)	1
UK Dance (Official Charts)	2
UK Indie (Official Charts)	1
US Bubbling Under Hot 100 (Billboard)	13
US Dance Club Songs (Billboard)	14
US Dance Singles Sales (Billboard)	38
US Hot R&B/Hip-Hop Songs (Billboard)	90
US Hot Rap Songs (Billboard)	45

==== Year-end charts ====
Year-end chart performance for "It's Like That"
Chart (1998)	Position
Australia (ARIA)	2
Austria (Ö3 Austria Top 40)	10
Belgium (Ultratop 50 Flanders)	40
Belgium (Ultratop 50 Wallonia)	13
Europe (Eurochart Hot 100)	2
France (SNEP)	62
Germany (Media Control)	6
Iceland (Íslenski Listinn Topp 40)	8
Netherlands (Dutch Top 40)	29
Netherlands (Single Top 100)	4
New Zealand (RIANZ)	2
Sweden (Hitlistan)	19
Switzerland (Schweizer Hitparade)	2
UK Singles (OCC)	3

==== Decade-end charts ====
Chart (1990–1999)	Rank
Austria (Ö3 Austria Top 40)	42

=== Certifications ===
Certifications and sales for "It's Like That"
Region	Certification	Certified units/sales
Australia (ARIA)	2× Platinum	140,000^{^}
Austria (IFPI Austria)	Gold	25,000^{*}
Belgium (BRMA)	Platinum	50,000^{*}
Finland (Musiikkituottajat)	Gold	6,495
France (SNEP)	Silver	125,000^{*}
Germany (BVMI)	3× Gold	900,000
Netherlands (NVPI)	Gold	50,000^{^}
New Zealand (RMNZ)	Platinum	10,000^{*}
Sweden (GLF)	Platinum	30,000^{^}
Switzerland (IFPI Switzerland)	Platinum	50,000^{^}
United Kingdom (BPI)	2× Platinum	1,250,000
^{*} Sales figures based on certification alone.^{^} Shipments figures based on certification alone.

=== Release history ===
Release dates for "It's Like That"
Region	Date	Format(s)	Label(s)	Ref.
United States	1997	10-inch vinyl; 12-inch vinyl; CD	Sm:)e Communications	
Australia	October 5, 1997	CD	DanceNet	
Germany	October 6, 1997	CD	Epidrome	
United Kingdom	March 9, 1998	10-inch vinyl; 12-inch vinyl; CD	Sm:)e Communications	
