= Run-DMC =

American hip-hop group

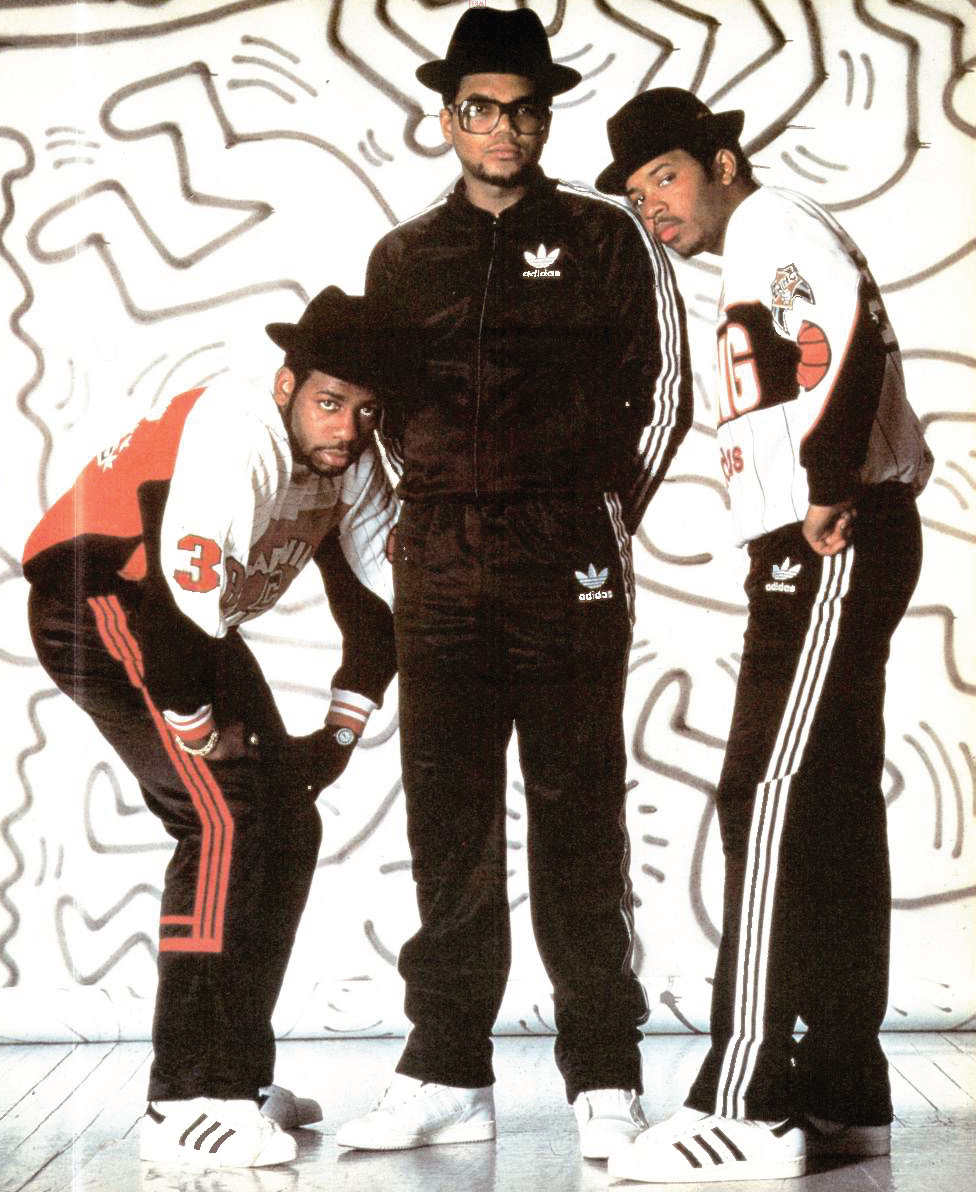
- Run-DMC in 1986. From left to right: Jason "Jam Master Jay" Mizell, Darryl "D.M.C." McDaniels, Joseph "Run" Simmons

Background information
- Origin: Queens, New York City, U.S.
- Genres: Hip-hop; rap rock
- Works: Discography
- Years active: 1983–2002; 2012–2014; 2023
- Labels: Profile; Arista; BMG
- Past members: Joseph "Run" Simmons; Darryl "D.M.C." McDaniels; Jason "Jam Master Jay" Mizell
- Website: rundmc.com

Run-DMC (also formatted Run-D.M.C., RUN DMC, or some combination thereof) was an American hip-hop group formed in Hollis, Queens, New York City in 1983 by Joseph Simmons, Darryl McDaniels, and Jason Mizell. Run-DMC is regarded as one of the most influential acts in the history of hip-hop culture and especially one of the most famous hip-hop acts of the 1980s. Along with Beastie Boys, LL Cool J, DJ Jazzy Jeff & the Fresh Prince, and Public Enemy, the group pioneered new-school hip-hop music and helped usher in golden age hip-hop. The group was among the first to popularize the MC and DJ relationship.

With the release of Run-D.M.C. (1984), Run-DMC became the first hip-hop group to achieve a Gold record. Run-D.M.C. was followed with the certified Platinum record King of Rock (1985), making Run-DMC the first hip-hop group to go platinum. Raising Hell (1986) became the first multi-platinum hip-hop record. Run-DMC's cover of "Walk This Way", featuring the group Aerosmith, charted higher on the Billboard Hot 100 than Aerosmith's original version, peaking at number four. It became one of the best-known songs in both hip-hop and rock. Run-DMC was the first hip-hop act to have their music videos broadcast on MTV, appear on American Bandstand, be on the cover of Rolling Stone, perform at Live Aid, and be nominated for a Grammy Award.

In 2004, Rolling Stone ranked Run-DMC at number 48 in its list of the 100 Greatest Artists of All Time. In 2007, they were named The Greatest Hip-Hop Group of All Time by MTV and Greatest Hip-Hop Artist of All Time by VH1. In 2009, Run-DMC became the second hip-hop group (after Grandmaster Flash & the Furious Five, 2007) to be inducted into the Rock and Roll Hall of Fame. In 2016, the group received a Grammy Lifetime Achievement Award. In 2018, Raising Hell was inducted into the National Recording Registry by the Library of Congress as being "culturally, historically, or aesthetically significant".

== History ==
=== Early career ===
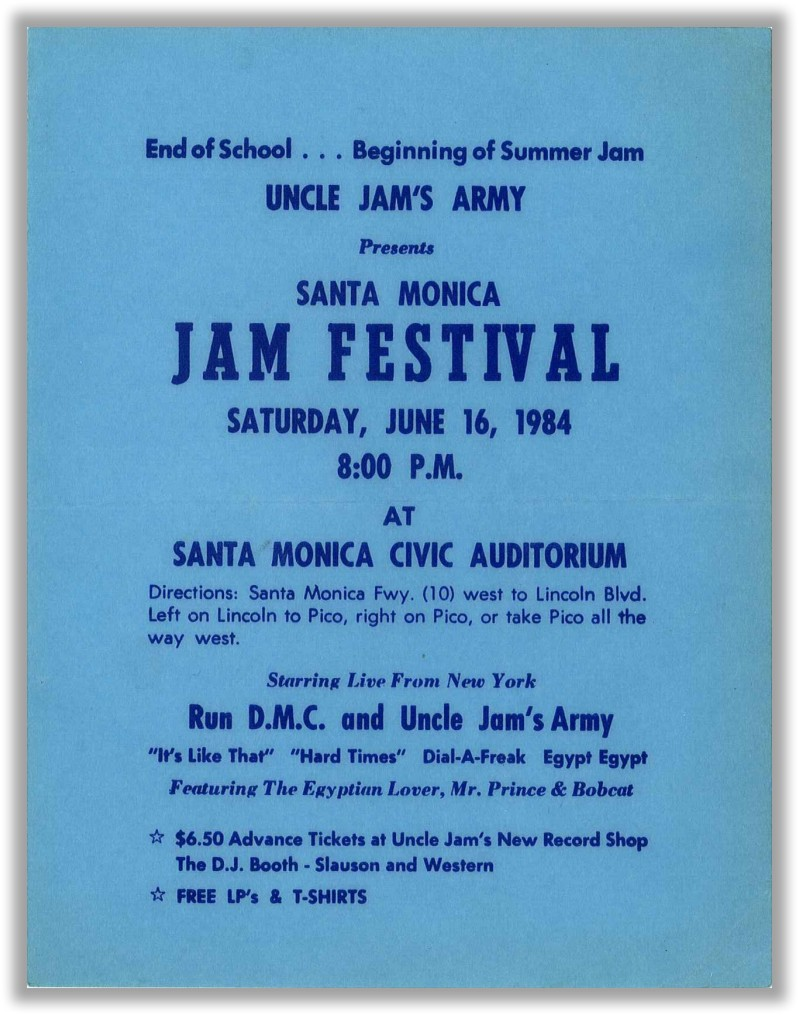
A poster for a Southern California concert starring the group in 1984

The three members of Run-DMC grew up in Hollis, Queens. As a teenager, Joseph Simmons was recruited into hip-hop by his older brother, Russell, who was then an up-and-coming hip-hop promoter. Simmons appeared onstage as a DJ for solo rapper Kurtis Blow, who was managed by Russell. Known as "DJ Run, Son of Kurtis Blow", Simmons soon began performing with Blow. Previously, McDaniels had been more focused on athletics than music, but soon began to DJ after purchasing a set of turntables. Simmons convinced McDaniels to start rapping, and though McDaniels would not perform in public, he soon began writing rhymes and was known as "Easy D".

Simmons and McDaniels started hanging around Two-Fifths Park in Hollis in the late 1970s, hoping to rap for the local DJs who performed and competed there; the most popular one known to frequent the park was Jason Mizell, then known as "Jazzy Jase". Mizell was known for his flashy wardrobe and d-boy attitude, which led to minor legal troubles as a teen. Thereafter, he decided to pursue music fame and began entertaining in the park soon after. Eventually, Simmons and McDaniels rapped in front of Mizell at the park, and the three became friends. Following Russell's success managing Kurtis Blow, he helped Run record his first single, a song called "Street Kid". The song went unnoticed, but despite the single's failure, Run's enthusiasm for hip-hop was growing. Simmons soon wanted to record again—-this time with McDaniels, but Russell refused, citing a dislike for D's rhyming style. After they graduated from high school and started college in 1982, Simmons and McDaniels finally convinced Russell to let them record as a duo, and they recruited Mizell (who was now known as Jam Master Jay) to be their official DJ. The following year, in 1983, Russell agreed to help them record a new single and land a record deal, and marketed the group as "Run-D.M.C.", a name that the group hated at first. DMC said later, "We wanted to be the Dynamic Two, the Treacherous Two — when we heard that shit we was like, 'We're gonna be ruined!'"

The group's name used Joseph Simmons's DJ name, DJ Run. It was combined with several letters from Darryl McDaniel's name. (DMC can also stand for "Devastating Mic Controller" and in one instance, Darryl rapped in King of Rock "People always ask, 'DMC, what does it mean?' D's for never dirty, MC for mostly clean.")

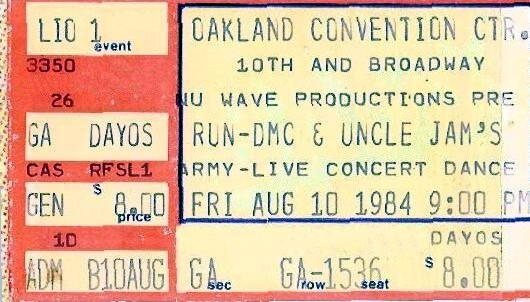
A ticket for a 1984 concert in Oakland, California

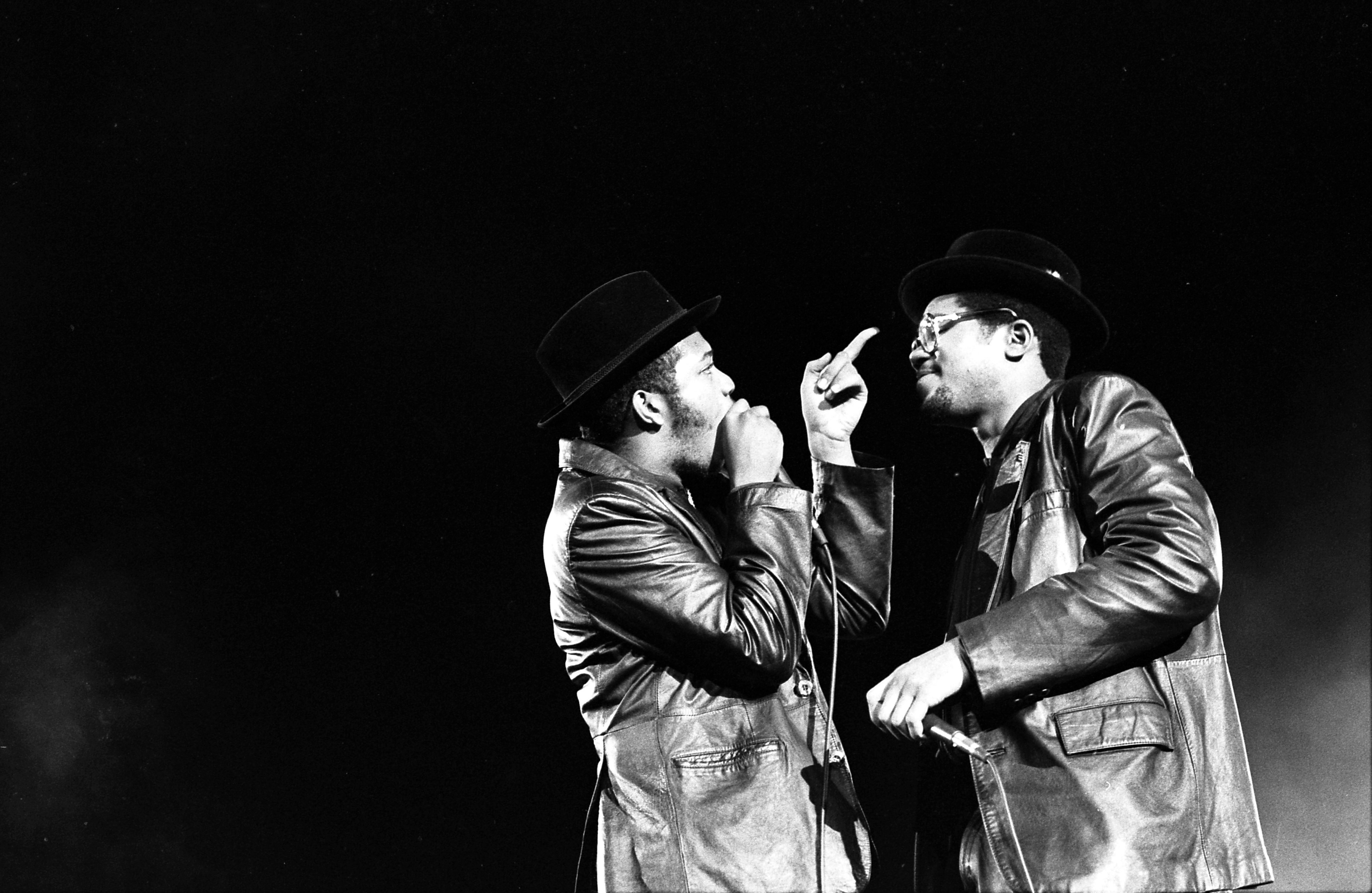
Simmons (left) and McDaniels (right) performing in 1984 in Long Beach, California.

After signing with Profile Records, Run-DMC released their debut single "It's Like That/Sucker MCs" in late 1983. The single was well received, peaking at No. 15 on the R&B charts. The trio performed the single on the New York Hot Tracks video show in 1983. Emboldened by their success, Run-DMC released their eponymous debut album Run-D.M.C. in 1984. Hit singles such as "Jam-Master Jay" and "Hard Times" proved that the group were more than a one-hit wonder, and the landmark single "Rock Box" was a groundbreaking fusion of raw hip-hop and hard rock that would become a cornerstone of the group's sound and paved the way for the rap rock-subgenre movement of the 1990s.

Run-DMC's swift ascension to the forefront of rap with a new sound and style meant that old-school hip-hop artists were becoming outdated. Along with pushing rap into a new direction musically, Run-DMC changed the entire aesthetic of hip-hop music and culture. Old school rappers like Afrika Bambaataa and Melle Mel of Grandmaster Flash and the Furious Five tended to dress in the flashy attire that was commonly attributed to glam rock and disco acts of the era: tight leather, chest-baring shirts, gloves and hats with rhinestones and spikes, leather boots, etc. Run-DMC discarded the more glam aspects of early hip-hop fashion (which were later readopted in 1990 by more "pop" rappers like MC Hammer and Vanilla Ice) and incorporated a more "street" sense of style such as Kangol hats, Cazal glasses, leather jackets, and unlaced Adidas shoes. The group's look had been heavily influenced by Mizell's own personal style. When Russell Simmons saw Jay's flashy, yet street b-boy style; he insisted the entire group follow suit. Run said later:

There were guys that wore hats like those and sneakers with no shoestrings. It was a very street thing to wear, extremely rough. They couldn't wear shoelaces in jail and we took it as a fashion statement. The reason they couldn't have shoelaces in jail was that they might hang themselves. That's why DMC says "My Adidas only bring good news and they are not used as felon shoes".

That embrace of the look and style of the street would heavily influence the next 25 years of hip-hop fashion.

Despite not receiving as much recognition as McDaniels and Simmons, Jason "Jam Master Jay" Mizell had greater behind-the-scenes influence with Run-DMC than widely assumed, and gave the group their street credential image. Mizell, who discovered 50 Cent, has also been credited with taking the hip hop genre to a wider worldwide audience. Mizell in fact developed the sound on most Run-DMC songs, with The Guardian describing him in 2012 as being the Run-DMC member who "created almost every sound that Run and DMC would rap over."

=== King of Rock, Raising Hell and mainstream success ===
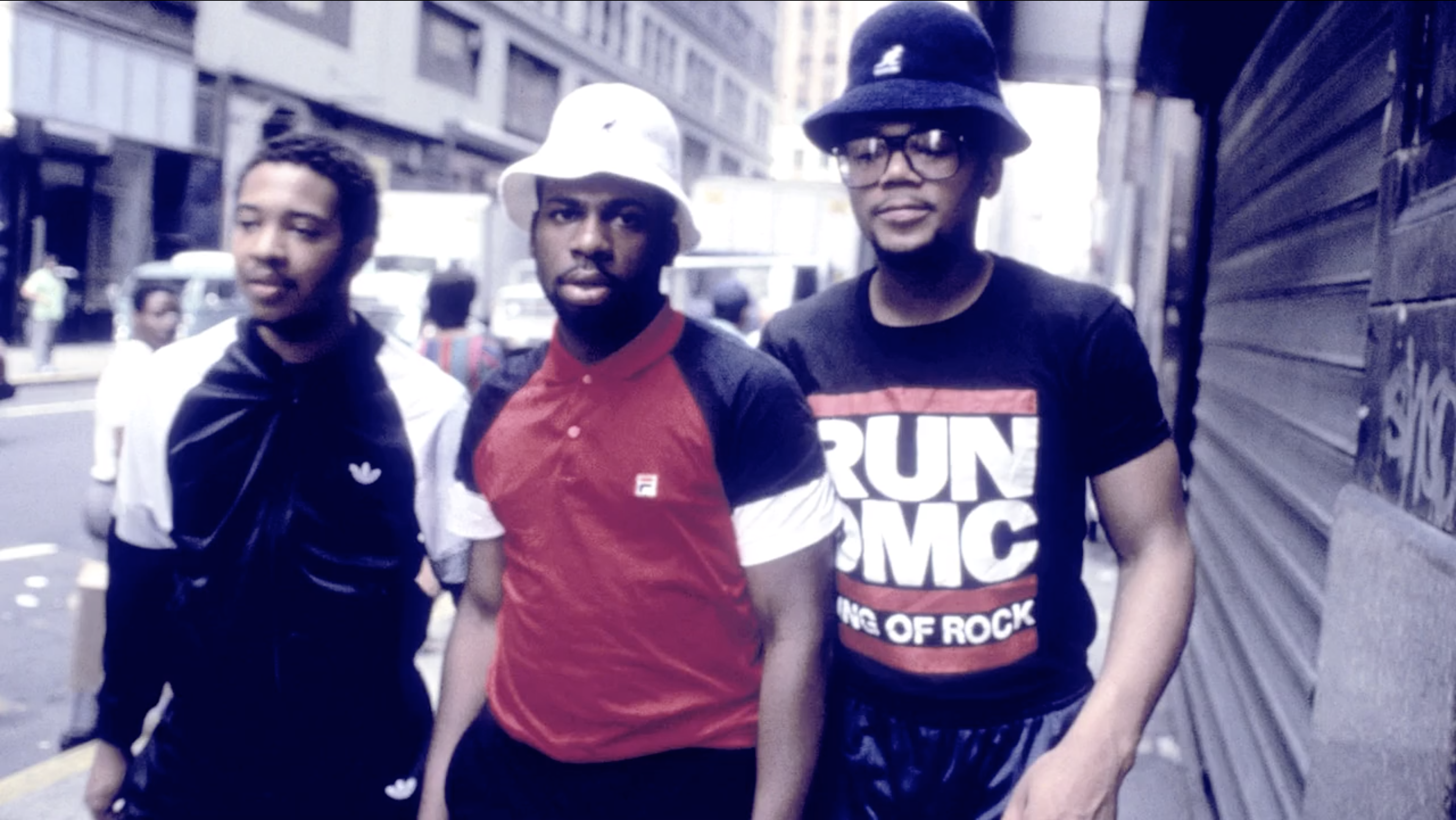
Run-DMC in 1985.

After the success of their first album, Run-DMC looked to branch out on their follow-up. The release of King of Rock in 1985 saw the group furthering their rap rock fusion on songs like "Can You Rock It Like This" and the title track; while "Roots, Rap, Reggae" was one of the first rap/dancehall hybrids. The music video for the single "Rock Box" was the first ever hip-hop music video to be broadcast on MTV and received heavy rotation from the channel. The song was the group's most popular hit at that point and the album was certified platinum. Run-DMC performed at the legendary Live Aid benefit shortly after Rock Box was released.

In late-1985, Run-DMC were featured in the hip-hop film Krush Groove, a fictionalized retelling of Russell Simmons' rise as a hip-hop entrepreneur and his struggles to get his own label, Def Jam Recordings, off the ground. The film featured a young Blair Underwood as Russell, along with appearances by old-school legend Kurtis Blow, the Fat Boys, teen pop act New Edition, LL Cool J, Prince protegee Sheila E., and hip-hop's first successful White rap group, the Beastie Boys, who were signed to Simmons' Def Jam label. The film was a hit in cinemas and was further proof of hip-hop's continued mainstream visibility.

Returning to the studio in 1986, the group teamed with producer Rick Rubin for their third album. Rubin had just produced LL Cool J's debut album Radio. They later released their third album, titled Raising Hell, which became the group's most successful album and one of the best-selling rap albums of all time. The album was certified double-platinum and peaked at number three on the charts.

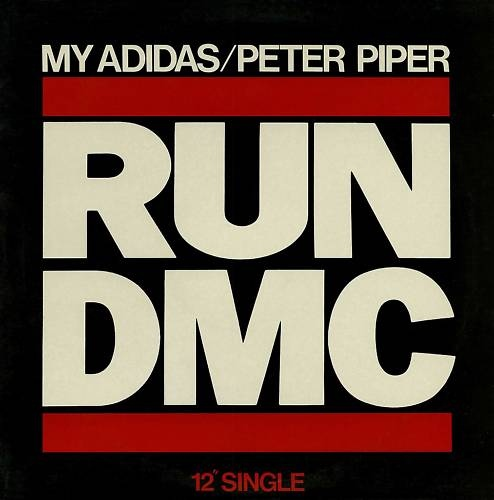
12" single cover for the group's single "My Adidas"

They were almost done with the album, but Rubin thought that it needed an element that would appeal to rock fans as well. This spurred the lead single "Walk This Way", a collaboration with the group Aerosmith, who years earlier had done their original version of the classic hard rock song on their album Toys in the Attic. The original intention was to just rap over a sample of the song, but Rubin and Jay insisted on doing a complete cover version. Members of the group Aerosmith (including Steven Tyler and Joe Perry) were called to join Run-DMC in the studio to add their vocals and guitars. The song and video became one of the biggest hits of the 1980s, reaching No. 4 on the Hot 100, and cemented Run-DMC's crossover status. It also resurrected Aerosmith's career. The single "My Adidas" led to the group signing a $1,600,000 endorsement deal with athletic apparel brand Adidas. Adidas formed a long-term relationship with Run-DMC and hip-hop. This has been described as the "beginning of what we have come to know as hip-hop fashion".

The success of Raising Hell is often credited with kick-starting hip-hop's golden age, when rap music's visibility, variety, and commercial viability exploded onto the national stage and became a global phenomenon. Their success paved the way for acts like LL Cool J and the Beastie Boys. The group toured in the wake of the album's success, but the Raising Hell Tour was marred by violence, particularly fights between rival street gangs in places like Los Angeles. Though Run-DMC's lyrics had been angry, confrontational and aggressive, they typically denounced crime and ignorance, but the media began to blame the group for the incidents. In the wake of the violence, Run-DMC would call for a day of peace between the gangs in Los Angeles. In 1987, following on from the Raising Hell Tour, Run-DMC embarked on the Together Forever Tour with the Beastie Boys.

=== Tougher Than Leather, changing times ===
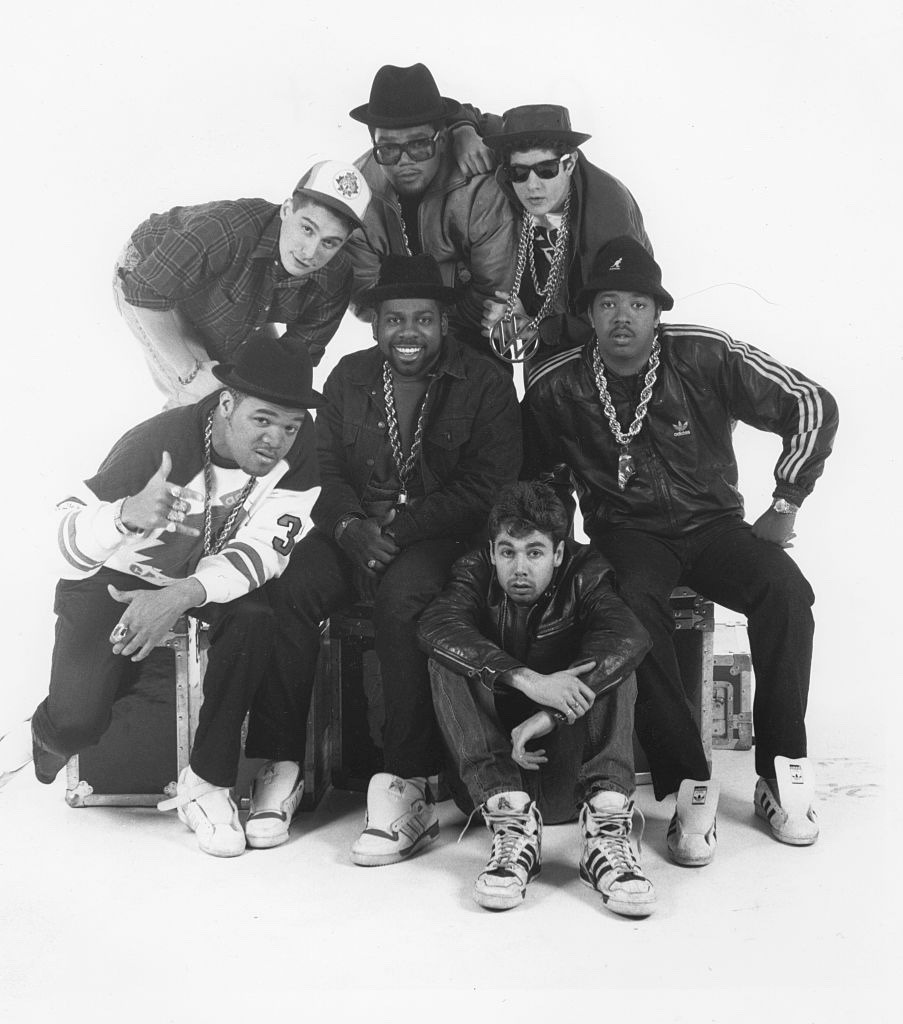
Run-DMC with the members of Beastie Boys and DJ Hurricane in a 1987 publicity photo to promote the Together Forever Tour.

After spending 1987 on tour supporting Raising Hell, Run-DMC released Tougher Than Leather in 1988. The album saw the group discarding much of their rap rock leanings for a grittier, more sample-heavy sound. Despite not selling as well as its predecessor, the album boasted several strong singles, including: "Run's House", "Beats to the Rhyme", and "Mary Mary". Though at the time considered a disappointing follow-up to the blockbuster Raising Hell, the album has grown in stature. In the 2000 liner notes for the album's re-release, Chuck D of Public Enemy would call the album "...a spectacular performance against all odds and expectations".

Later in 1988, the group made their second film appearance in Tougher Than Leather, a would-be crime caper that was directed by Rick Rubin and featured special guest performances by the Beastie Boys and Slick Rick. The film bombed at the box office, but strengthened the indirect relationship between Run-DMC and the Def Jam label which led to the common misconception that the group was signed to the label. They were, however, managed by Russell Simmons, produced by Rick Rubin (who founded Def Jam, along with Simmons), and often shared concert tour spotlight with acts on the label's roster.

Amidst the changing times and sliding sales, Run-DMC released Back from Hell in 1990. The album was the worst-reviewed of their career, as the group tried to re-create itself musically with ill-advised forays into new jack swing (a then-popular style of production that sonically merged hip-hop and contemporary R&B) and sometimes-preachy lyrical content. The two singles released, the anti-drug, anti-crime song "Pause" and street narrative "The Ave" had little success, and the group began to look outdated. Reeling from their first taste of failure, personal problems began to surface for the trio. McDaniels, who had been a heavy drinker in recent years, was losing control to alcoholism. Jay was involved in a life-threatening car accident and survived two gunshot wounds after an incident in 1990. In 1991, Simmons was charged with raping a college student in Ohio, though the charges were later dropped.

With so much personal chaos and professional uncertainty, the members turned to faith to try to steady their lives. Both Simmons and McDaniels joined the church, with Run becoming especially devoted following his legal troubles and the toll it took on his finances.

After a three-year hiatus that seemingly saw rap music move on without them, the rejuvenated Run-DMC returned in 1993 with Down with the King. Building on the gritty sound of Tougher Than Leather, and adding some subtle religious references, the album featured guest appearances and production by several hip-hop notables (including Pete Rock & CL Smooth and Q-Tip of A Tribe Called Quest). Buoyed by the title track and first single, the album entered the charts at No. 1 and No. 7 on the pop charts.

Even though the album went platinum, the song proved to be their last hit. Jam Master Jay also found success on his own; he had founded his own label JMJ Records, and discovered and produced the group Onyx, which had tremendous success in 1993 following the release of their hit single, "Slam". Later that same year, Run became an ordained minister, and in 1995 the iconic group appeared in The Show, a Def Jam-produced documentary that featured several of hip-hop's biggest acts discussing the lifestyle and sacrifices of the industry.

=== Later years, Mizell's murder and breakup ===
Over the next few years, the group did very little recording. Mizell produced and mentored up-and-coming artists, including Onyx and 50 Cent, whom he eventually signed to the JMJ label. Simmons got divorced, remarried, and began to focus on his spiritual and philanthropic endeavors by becoming a reverend. He also wrote a book alongside his brother Russell. McDaniels made an appearance on the Notorious B.I.G.'s 1997 double album Life After Death, and during the same time, married and focused on raising his family.

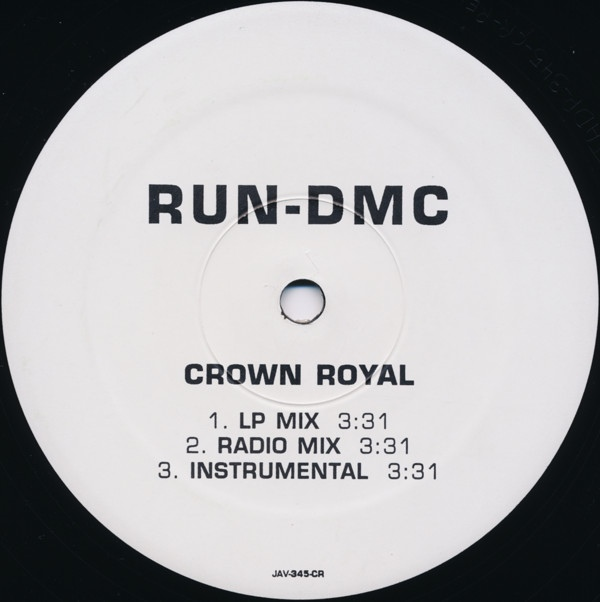
A single from Run-DMC's final album Crown Royal

Though the group continued to tour around the world, over a decade of living as a rap superstar was beginning to take a toll on McDaniels. He was beginning to tire of Run-DMC, and there was increased friction between him and Simmons, who was eager to return to recording (Simmons had at this time adopted the moniker Rev Run in light of his religious conversion). While on tour in Europe in 1997, McDaniels' ongoing battle with substance abuse led to a bout of severe depression, which spurred an addiction to prescription drugs. McDaniels' depression continued for years, so much so that he contemplated suicide.

In 1997, producer and remixer Jason Nevins remixed "It's Tricky" and "It's Like That". Nevins' remix of "It's Like That" hit number 1 in the United Kingdom, Germany, and many other European countries. A video was made for "It's Like That", although no new footage of Run-DMC appeared in it. In 1999, Run-DMC recorded the theme song for WWF wrestling stable D-Generation X entitled "The Kings", which appeared on the WWF Aggression album. They also made an appearance in a rare version of the music video "Bodyrock" by Moby.

Soon after, the group finally returned to the studio, but in an increasingly tense environment, as Simmons and McDaniels' differences had begun to show. In the wake of the exploding popularity of rap-rock artists like Korn, Limp Bizkit, and Kid Rock, Simmons wanted to return to the aggressive, hard rock-tinged sound that made the group famous. McDaniels – who had become a fan of thoughtful singer-songwriters like John Lennon, Harry Chapin, and Sarah McLachlan – wanted to go in a more introspective direction. Appearing on VH1's documentary series Behind the Music in early 2000, McDaniels confirmed that he was creatively frustrated and highlighted some songs that he was recording on his own. The continued friction led to McDaniels sitting out most of the group's recording sessions in protest.

Simmons, in defiance, recorded material anyway, inviting several guest stars such as Kid Rock, Jermaine Dupri, Adrian Burley, Tony Fredianelli, and Stephan Jenkins of Third Eye Blind, Method Man, and fellow Queens MCs Nas and Prodigy of Mobb Deep to contribute to the project. The resulting album, Crown Royal, was delayed due to personal problems, and when it was finally released in 2001, it featured only three appearances by DMC. Despite having no major singles, the album initially sold well. However, many critics blasted the lack of DMC's involvement. Some positive reviews were published: Entertainment Weekly noted that "on this hip hop roast, new schoolers Nas and Fat Joe pay their respects with sparkling grooves...Run's rhymes are still limber."

After Crown Royal, the group embarked on a worldwide tour with their "Walk This Way" compatriots, Aerosmith. The tour was a rousing success, celebrating the collaboration between the two acts and acknowledging the innumerable rap and rock acts that had been influenced by their seminal hit 15 years prior. Even though he had little to do with the album, McDaniels was relishing the stage; he had been suffering from an inoperable vocal disorder that had rendered his once-booming voice a strained mumble. Performing allowed McDaniels to come out of his depression, and he appeared revitalized on the tour. There was even talk of Run-DMC finally signing with Def Jam, which by then was no longer held by its original founders. Simmons, however, had been growing increasingly tired of hip-hop. His family was growing, and he was assisting with his brother Russell's Phat Farm clothing imprint, making Run-DMC less of a priority. Despite the success of the tour and Aerosmith consequently discussing adding additional dates, Simmons abruptly announced that he was quitting.

==== Murder ====
On October 30, 2002, Mizell was shot and killed at his recording studio in Queens. Fans and friends set up a memorial outside the studio with Adidas sneakers, albums, and flowers. In the aftermath, Simmons and McDaniels announced the official disbanding of the group. Mizell's murder remained unsolved until August 2020, with the arrest of Ronald Washington and Karl Jordan Jr. Washington and Jordan Jr. would later be convicted for the murder in February 2024. A third suspect, Jay Bryant, was charged in May 2023, but later arranged to have a trial which would be separate from Washington and Jordan Jr. The accusation of Bryant being the murderer is consistent with the testimony of a neutral witness, Yarrah Concepcion. Concepcion testified about a fight before the shot, and a hat with the DNA of Bryant was found next to Mizell's body.

=== Post-breakup ===
In 2004, Run-DMC was one of the first acts honored on the first annual VH1 Hip Hop Honors, alongside legends like 2Pac and the Sugarhill Gang. The Beastie Boys paid tribute. Simmons did not attend the show; he was recording his first solo album, Distortion. McDaniels also released a solo album, Checks Thugs and Rock n Roll. He had recently discovered that he was adopted, which led him to be the center of the VH1 program My Adoption Journey, a documentary chronicling his re-connection with his biological family. McDaniels was also featured in the 2008 video game, Guitar Hero: Aerosmith, making appearances in the songs "Walk this Way" and "King of Rock". He frequently contributed to VH1 programs such as the I Love The... series, and he released the song "Rock Show" featuring singer Stephan Jenkins. Simmons also turned to television, starring in Run's House, a reality show that followed his life as a father and husband.

In June 2007, McDaniels appeared with Aerosmith performing "Walk This Way" for their encore at the Hard Rock Calling festival in London. Simmons joined Kid Rock's 2008 Rock N Roll Revival Tour, performing "It's Like That", "It's Tricky", "You Be Illin'", "Run's House", "Here We Go", "King of Rock" and "Walk This Way" with Kid Rock. They also covered "For What It's Worth" at the end of the show. In 2007, Mizell's wife, Terry, Simmons, and McDaniels also launched the J.A.M. Awards in Jay's memory. Jay's vision for social Justice, Arts and Music was promoted by many recording artists, including Snoop Dogg, LL Cool J, Raekwon, Jim Jones, M.O.P., Papoose, Everlast, DJ Muggs, Kid Capri, De La Soul, Mobb Deep, EPMD, Dead Prez, Biz Markie and Marley Marl. In October 2008, Mizell's one-time protege 50 Cent announced plans to produce a documentary about his fallen mentor. In 2008 Run-DMC was nominated for 2009 induction into the Rock and Roll Hall of Fame.

On January 14, 2009, it was confirmed that Run-DMC would be one of the five inductees to the Rock and Roll Hall of Fame. On April 3, 2009, Run-DMC became the second rap act to be awarded the honor (after Grandmaster Flash and the Furious Five, who were inducted in 2007). The group reunited at Jay-Z's Made in America Festival in September 2012. Simmons and McDaniels then reunited again for Fun Fun Fun Fest in Austin, Texas in November 2012, and again in June 2013 and August 2014 for summer concerts in Atlanta, Georgia. Despite McDaniels and Simmons making sporadic appearances together, Run-DMC did not record any new music in the time following Jam Master Jay's death.

Following the success of Notorious, it was announced in 2009 that a Run-DMC biographical film was in the works, with the screenplay by Notorious writer Cheo Hodari Coker. The film was rumored to depict the life and story of the group beginning from their inception in Hollis, Queens, and leading up to the 2002 murder of Jam Master Jay. However, the project never went into production.

In September 2021, McDaniels was signed to Nickelodeon to perform the music for the NOGGIN SVOD series What's The Word? a 15-episodes series which featured an animated version of McDaniels teaching children reading and vocabulary skills. The soundtrack for the short-form program was released on January 13, 2022. At the same time, Nickelodeon collaborated with McDaniels for a consumer products line deal. On January 4, 2022, McDaniels published his first children's book called Daryl's Dream and since then, all of McDaniels' preschool content portfolio was compiled into an Amazon.com page titled "Young DMC" which is a wordplay on the name of the former hip-hop trio.

On August 11, 2023, Rev. Joseph "Run" Simmons and Darryl "DMC" McDaniels gave what they stated would be their final performance as Run-DMC at a "Hip Hip 50" celebration concert held at Yankee Stadium in New York City.

== Legacy ==
Stephen Thomas Erlewine, editor of AllMusic, has written: "More than any other hip hop group, Run-D.M.C. are responsible for the sound and style of [hip-hop] music." Musically, they moved hip-hop and rap music away from the funk and disco-oriented sound of its beginnings, into an altogether new and unique sonic imprint. Their sound is directly responsible for intentionally transforming rap music from dance-and club-oriented funk grooves like "Rapper's Delight" and "The Breaks" to an aggressive, less-danceable approach. Characterized by sparse, hard-hitting beats—as typified on hits like "It's Like That" and "Peter Piper"—this would form the foundation of hardcore hip-hop. As such, Run-DMC is considered the originators of the style, and hardcore hip-hop would dominate the next two decades of rap music, from the bombastic, noisy sound of Public Enemy and stripped minimalism of Boogie Down Productions to the thump of early Wu-Tang Clan and Nas. Their influence was not limited to the East Coast, however. Los Angeles' N.W.A, on their landmark 1989 album Straight Outta Compton, showed heavy influences from Tougher Than Leather-era Run-DMC, and Chicano rap act Cypress Hill were definitely influenced by Run-DMC's fusion of rap and rock.

Rap rock fusion proved to be influential among rock artists, with 1980s bands like Faith No More, and Red Hot Chili Peppers adding elements of rap to alternative rock and heavy metal. Most notably, the rap rock genre became popular in the late 1990s, with bands like Rage Against the Machine, KoRn, Kid Rock, Limp Bizkit, and Linkin Park. Aesthetically, they changed the way rappers presented themselves. Onstage, old school rappers had previously performed in flashy attire and colorful costumes, typically had a live band and, in the case of acts like Whodini, had background dancers. Run-DMC performed with only Run and DMC out front, and Jam-Master Jay on the turntables behind them, in what is now considered the classic hip-hop stage setup: two turntables and microphones. They embraced the look and style of the street by wearing jeans, lace-less Adidas sneakers, and their trademark black fedoras. The group shunned both the over-the-top wardrobe of previous rap stars like the Furious Five and Afrika Bambaataa, and the silk-shirted, jheri curled, ladies' man look of rappers like Kurtis Blow and Spoonie Gee. Followers of their style included LL Cool J and the Beastie Boys; seemingly overnight, rappers were wearing jeans and sneakers instead of rhinestones and leather outfits. From Adidas tracksuits and rope chains to baggy jeans and Timberland footwear, hip-hop's look remained married to the styles of the street. According to the Rolling Stone Encyclopedia of Rock & Roll:

Run-D.M.C. took hardcore hip-hop from an underground street sensation to a pop-culture phenomenon. Although earlier artists, such as Grandmaster Flash and The Sugarhill Gang, made rap's initial strides on the airwaves, it was Run-D.M.C. that introduced hats, gold chains, and untied sneakers to youth culture's most stubborn demographic group: young white male suburban rock fans. In the process, the trio helped change the course of popular music, paving the way for rap's second generation.

In 2004, Rolling Stone ranked them number 48 in their list of the "100 Greatest Artists of All Time". In 2007, Run-DMC was named "The Greatest Hip-Hop Group of All Time" by MTV.com and "Greatest Hip-Hop Artist of All Time" by VH1. In 2009, Run-DMC became the second hip-hop group to be inducted into the Rock and Roll Hall of Fame. In 2016, Run-DMC received the Grammy Lifetime Achievement Award.

Historically, the group achieved a number of notable firsts in hip-hop music and are credited with being the act most responsible for pushing hip-hop into mainstream popular music, initiating its musical and artistic evolution and enabling its growth as a global phenomenon. Run-DMC is the first rap act to have reached a number of major accomplishments:

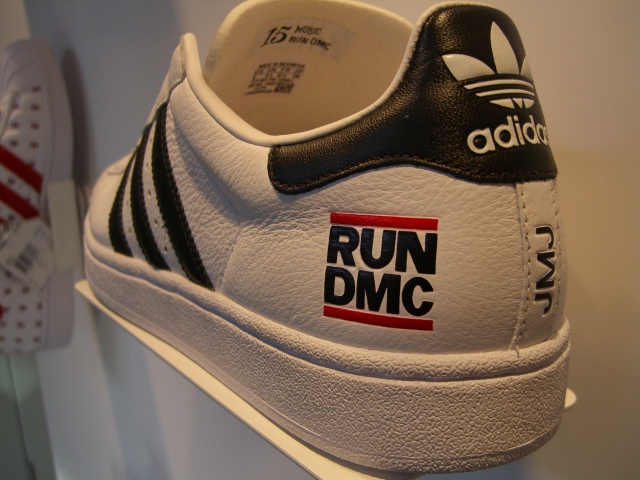
Adidas sneakers with the Run-DMC logo

- A No. 1 R&B charting hip-hop album
- The second hip-hop act to appear on American Bandstand (the Sugar Hill Gang appeared first on the program in 1981)
- The first hip-hop act to chart in the Top 40 of the Billboard Hot 100 more than once
- The first hip-hop artist with a Top 10 pop charting rap album
- One of the first hip-hop artists with Gold, Platinum, and multi-Platinum albums
- The first hip-hop act to appear on the cover of Rolling Stone magazine
- One of the first hip-hop acts to receive a Grammy Award nomination
- The first hip-hop act to make a video appearance on MTV
- The first hip-hop act to perform at a major arena
- Signed to a major product endorsement deal (Adidas)
- The second hip-hop act to be inducted into the Rock and Roll Hall of Fame (the first being Grandmaster Flash and the Furious Five)
- The first hip-hop act to receive the Grammy Lifetime Achievement Award

However, the group's legacy of being staunchly anti-drug, which included participating in an anti-drug public service announcement, holding anti-drug shows, and even including an anti-drug message in their song "It's Tricky", would be called into question during the lead up to the trial of Jam Master Jay's suspected killers Karl Jordan Jr. and Ronald Washington, with prosecutors revealing that Jam Master Jay himself would secretly become a high-kilo cocaine dealer in 1996. It was also revealed that his murder was connected to these dealings. However, his family still maintained that he didn't use drugs and the business was used to pay his expenses.

== Discography ==
Studio albums

- Run-D.M.C. (1984)
- King of Rock (1985)
- Raising Hell (1986)
- Tougher Than Leather (1988)
- Back from Hell (1990)
- Down with the King (1993)
- Crown Royal (2001)

== Filmography ==
- Krush Groove (1985)
- Big Fun in the Big Town (1986)
- Tougher Than Leather (1988)
- Who's the Man? (1993)
- The Show (1995)
- Lip Sync Battle (2015) – Episode: "Joseph Gordon-Levitt vs. Anthony Mackie"

Music videos

- Rock Box (1984)
- King of Rock (1985)
- You Talk Too Much (1985)
- It's Tricky (1986)
- My Adidas (1986)
- Proud to Be Black (1986)
- Walk This Way (feat. Aerosmith) (1986)
- Mary, Mary (1988)
- Beats to the Rhyme (live) (1988)
- Christmas in Hollis (1988)
- Run's House (1988)
- Pause (1989)
- Ghostbusters (1989)
- The Ave. (1990)
- What's It All About (1990)
- Faces (1991)
- Christmas Is (1992)
- Down with the King (feat. Pete Rock & CL Smooth) (1993)
- Ooh, What'cha Gonna Do (1993)
- Praise My DJ's (feat. Justine Simmons) (1999)
- The Kings [D-Generation X] (2000)
- Let's Stay Together (Together Forever) (feat. Jagged Edge) (2001)
- Rock Show (featuring Stephan Jenkins) (2001)

== General and cited references ==
- Appiah, Kwame Anthony and Gates, David Turner (2004). Arts and Letters: An A-to-Z Reference of Writers, Musicians, and Artists of the African American Experience. Philadelphia: Running Press. ISBN 0-7624-2042-1.
