= High Profile: The Original Rhymes =

Greatest hits album by Run-D.M.C.
- Released: January 1, 2002
- Recorded: 1983–1999
- Genre: Hip hop
- Label: BMG International

Run-D.M.C. chronology
Crown Royal (1999)	High Profile: The Original Rhymes (2002)	Greatest Hits (2002)

High Profile: The Original Rhymes is a compilation album of Run-D.M.C.'s material.

== Track listing ==
1. "Bounce"
2. "You Be Illin'"
3. "Sucker M.C.'s"
4. "It's Like That"
5. "King of Rock"
6. "It's Tricky"
7. "Can You Rock It Like This"
8. "Walk This Way" (featuring Aerosmith)
9. "Rock Box"
10. "You Talk Too Much" [Video Edit]
11. "Run's House"
12. "Peter Piper"
13. "My Adidas"
14. "Beats to the Rhyme"
15. "Jam Master Jay"
16. "Hard Times"
17. "Down with the King"
18. "Mary, Mary"
19. "Ghostbusters"
20. "Christmas in Hollis"

== Reception ==
Professional ratings
Review scores
Source	Rating
Gaffa.dk	5/6
RapmaniacZ	(positive)
