= Greatest Hits (Run-D.M.C. album) =

Greatest hits album by Run-D.M.C.
- Released: September 10, 2002
- Recorded: 1983–2001
- Genres: Hip hop; rap rock
- Length: 71:41
- Label: Arista
- Producers: Davy D; Rick Rubin; Russell Simmons; Run-DMC; Pete Rock; Steve Ett

Run-D.M.C. chronology
High Profile: The Original Rhymes (2002)	Greatest Hits (2002)	The Best of Run-DMC (2003)

Professional ratings
Review scores
Source	Rating
AllMusic	link
BBC	link
Robert Christgau	A
NME	4/5 stars

Greatest Hits is the second compilation album by American hip hop group Run-D.M.C. It was released on September 10, 2002 by Arista Records. While it was argued that hits such as "The Ave.", "Pause" and "Ooh, What'cha Gonna Do?" should have found a place in this release, Run speculated during a Marie Claire interview in 2003 that the album was simply showcasing the group's better known earlier work:

"I want kids to pick up this album and go '..So that's what hip hop sounded like in 1984, cool'. It's not because I dislike any of those [later] records."

After Jam Master Jay's death, the group retired, but in doing so, they failed to meet their contractual obligations with Arista Records, which left Run-D.M.C.'s entire catalog open for exploitation. Since the release of this record, Arista Records has released several other greatest hits albums of Run-D.M.C.'s material. However, fans consider this release the "official" greatest hits collection, because it was the last official Run-D.M.C. release before the death of Jam Master Jay.

== Track listing ==
1. "King of Rock"
2. "It's Tricky"
3. "Beats to the Rhyme"
4. "Can You Rock It Like This"
5. "Walk This Way" (featuring Aerosmith)
6. "Run's House"
7. "Rock Box"
8. "Peter Piper"
9. "Mary, Mary"
10. "Hard Times"
11. "You Be Illin'"
12. "It's Like That"
13. "My Adidas"
14. "Sucker M.C.'s (Krush-Groove 1)"
15. "You Talk Too Much"
16. "Jam-Master Jay"
17. "Down with the King" (featuring Pete Rock & CL Smooth)
18. "Christmas in Hollis"

== 2003 re-release ==
1. "It's Like That" (featuring Jason Nevins)
2. "Walk This Way" (featuring Aerosmith)
3. "Sucker MC's"
4. "My Adidas"
5. "King of Rock"
6. "It's Tricky"
7. "Can You Rock It Like This"
8. "You Be Illin'"
9. "Rock Box"
10. "Run's House"
11. "Peter Piper"
12. "Bounce"
13. "Beats to the Rhyme"
14. "Jam Master Jay"
15. "Hard Times"
16. "Down with the King"
17. "Mary Mary"
18. "What's It All About"
19. "It's Tricky 2003" (featuring Jacknife Lee)
