= Ultimate Run-D.M.C. =

Ultimate Run–D.M.C.

Compilation album by Run-DMC
- Released: October 28, 2003
- Recorded: 1983–1997
- Genres: Hip hop; rap rock
- Length: 71:44
- Label: Arista
- Producers: Larry Smith; Russell Simmons; Run-DMC; Rick Rubin; Davy D; Pete Rock; Jason Nevins; Roddey Hui (assistant)

Run-DMC chronology
The Best of Run–DMC (2003)	Ultimate Run–D.M.C. (2003)	The Essential Run–D.M.C. (2012)

Professional ratings
Review scores
Source	Rating
AllMusic	5/5 stars
HipHopDX	5/5 stars

Ultimate Run–D.M.C. is a 2003 compilation album by Run-DMC It contains 18 tracks as well as a bonus DVD with 14 music videos.

== Track listing ==
1. "Rock Box" – 5:32
2. "Run's House" – 3:45
3. "Walk This Way" (feat. Aerosmith) - 5:11
4. "Together Forever (Krush Groove 4)" (live at Hollis Park 1984) – 3:34
5. "King of Rock" – 5:14
6. "Jam-Master Jay" – 3:12
7. "Hit It Run" – 3:11
8. "It's Tricky" – 3:04
9. "Peter Piper" – 3:23
10. "It's Like That" – 4:51
11. "Raising Hell" – 5:33
12. "My Adidas" – 2:49
13. "Sucker M.C.'s (Krush Groove 1)" – 3:11
14. "Mary, Mary" – 3:14
15. "Here We Go" (Live at the Fun House) – 4:06
16. "Beats to the Rhyme" – 2:42
17. "Down with the King" – 5:04
18. "It's Like That" (Run-DMC vs. Jason Nevins) – 4:08

+ bonus DVD including 14 videos
