= I'm Not Going Out Like That =

Single by Run–D.M.C.

from the album Tougher Than Leather
- B-side: "How'd Ya Do It Dee"
- Released: January 24, 1988
- Recorded: 1987
- Genre: Hip hop
- Length: 4:54
- Label: Profile Records
- Songwriter(s): Joseph Simmons, Darryl McDaniels, Davy D
- Producer(s): Davy D

Run–D.M.C. singles chronology
"Christmas in Hollis" (1987)	"I'm Not Going Out Like That" (1988)	"Mary, Mary" (1988)

"I'm Not Going Out Like That" is the third single released from Run–D.M.C.'s fourth album Tougher Than Leather. It was released in 1988 by Profile Records and produced by Davy D. "I'm Not Going Out Like That" was not as successful as the previous two released singles from the album, "Run's House" and "Mary, Mary", peaking at number 40 on Billboard's Hot Black Singles chart in the U.S.

== Track listing ==
=== A-side ===
1. "I'm Not Going Out Like That" (House Mix) – 3:43
2. "I'm Not Going Out Like That" (Album Version) – 3:54

=== B-side ===
1. "I'm Not Going Out Like That" (Miami Mix) – 4:56
2. "How'd Ya Do It Dee" – 3:20
