= Sucker M.C.'s =

- 12-inch US retail vinyl release

Single by Run-D.M.C.

from the album Run-D.M.C.
- A-side: "It's Like That"
- Released: March 1983
- Recorded: 1983
- Genre: Hip hop
- Length: 3:09
- Label: Profile
- Songwriters: Darryl McDaniels; Joseph Simmons; Nathaniel S. Hardy Jr.; Terrance Balfour; Larry Smith
- Producers: Russell Simmons; Larry Smith; Terrance Balfour

Music video
- "Sucker M.C.'s" on YouTube

"Sucker M.C.'s" (also known as "Krush-Groove 1" or "Sucker M.C.'s (Krush-Groove 1)" and sometimes spelled as "Sucker MCs", "Sucker MC's" or "Sucker M.C.s") is a song by American hip hop group Run-D.M.C. It was first released in 1983 as B-side to "It's Like That". The two-sided release marked the start of Run-D.M.C.'s career as their first single, and it is widely regarded as ushering in a new school of hip hop artists with a street image and an abrasive, minimalist sound that marked them out from their predecessors. Both tracks were collected on the trio's self-titled debut album in 1984. WBAU was the first station to play the two songs.

== Background ==
At first considered a meaningless "bonus beat" by Terrance Balfour and Nathaniel S. Hardy Jr. to "It's Like That", the song has become legendary and was included as the first song on their first compilation album, Together Forever: Greatest Hits 1983–1991. The song is considered one of the seminal rap music songs, making it one of two songs by the group included on the Profile Records anthology album. The song is included in most of Run-D.M.C.'s compilation albums, including Together Forever: Greatest Hits 1983–1991, Greatest Hits, Ultimate Run-D.M.C., The Best of Run-DMC, High Profile: The Original Rhymes, and Super Hits. It was also included on the group's first live album, Live at Montreux 2001.

An MC or M.C. is an abbreviation for Master of Ceremonies, a reference to rappers who controlled the microphones. Sucker is a derogatory street term for someone who believes he has skills, but who does not. It is derived from the common slang term sucker, relating to one who is gullible.

For Peter Shapiro, Run-D.M.C.'s 1983 two-song release "It's like That"/"Sucker M.C.'s" "completely changed hip-hop" "rendering everything that preceded it distinctly old school with one fell swoop." In a 47-point timeline of hip hop and its antecedents spanning 64 years, Shapiro lists this release as his 43rd point. Reviewing Toop's book in the LA Weekly, Oliver Wang of Soul Sides concurs, hailing Run-D.M.C. as inaugurating the new school of rap. Marley Marl's first production was an "answer song" to "Sucker M.C.'s" in 1983 entitled "Sucker DJ's (I Will Survive)" by Dimples D.

According to the 2010 book Christopher R. Weingarten book It takes a nation of millions to hold us back, the song was an early inspiration to Rick Rubin.

== Composition and lyrics ==
"Sucker MC's"
sample of "Sucker MC's" by Run-D.M.C. from Run-D.M.C

The title Krush-Groove 1 stems from the fact that it is one of four songs (along with "Hollis Crew (Krush-Groove 2)," "Darryl & Joe (Krush-Groove 3)," and "Together Forever (Krush-Groove 4)") by the rap duo that used backing tracks made by Orange Krush to rap over. All of the rhythm tracks aside from the drums of the original Orange Krush recording were removed by Orange Krush member Davy DMX, which inspired the lyric "Dave cut the record down to the bone". The sparse "beat only" track became a catalyst for the future emphasis on the drum beat and a break away from the more elaborate music production rap music was known for at the time. In the case of "Sucker M.C.'s", there was a loud, Oberheim DMX drum machine, a few scratches and nothing else, while the rhymes harangued weak rappers, which the song refers to by name, and contrasted them to the group's success. "It's Like That" and "Sucker M.C.'s" relied completely on synthetic sounds via an Oberheim DMX drum machine programmed by both Nathaniel S. Hardy Jr. and Terrance Balfour, ignoring samples entirely. According to the liner notes for Together Forever: Greatest Hits 1983–1991, producer Russell Simmons said "I don't care what you say just mention Orange Krush [co-producer Larry Smith's band] and where you go to school", which they did in the lyrics.

DJ Run mentioned Orange Krush, as well as Smith (see musical sample above) more than once. DMC mentioned St. John's University. Other lyrics included Run's derision of the sucker M.C.'s "who can't get down", making this the claimed first dis rap on record according to the Together Forever liner notes. DMC, boasted of his Hollis, Queens heritage, making him a groundbreaker as a non-Bronx rapper.

== Legacy ==
In Shea Serrano's Rap Year Book, Sucker M.C.'s was selected as the most important rap song of the year 1983, ahead their song "It's Like That", Melle Mel's "White Lines (Don't Don't Do It)" and Too $hort's "Don't Stop Rappin'", as it "marked the beginning of rap's second generation." In 2021, it was listed at No. 406 on Rolling Stone's "Top 500 Best Songs of All Time".

=== Covers ===
- Wu-Tang Clan on In tha Beginning...There Was Rap (1997)
  - Rereleased on Legend of the Wu-Tang: Wu-Tang Clan's Greatest Hits (2004)
- Lordz of Brooklyn featuring Stoned Soul, and Everlast on Take a Bite Outta Rhyme: A Rock Tribute to Rap (2000)
- Beastie Boys, Mix Master Mike and Doug E. Fresh at the 1st annual VH1 Hip Hop Honors (2004)

=== Film and television samples ===
- 1985 Rosanna Arquette and Madonna movie Desperately Seeking Susan (although not on the soundtrack)
- 1991 Boyz n the Hood (1984 scenes)

=== Music samples ===
- "Night of the Living Baseheads" (1988) on It Takes a Nation of Millions to Hold Us Back (1988) by Public Enemy
- "Beats to the Rhyme" on Tougher Than Leather (1988) by Run-D.M.C.
- "Super Rhyme Maker" on Grits Sandwiches for Breakfast (1990) by Kid Rock
- "Sucka Ass Niggas" on 1990-Sick (1995) by Spice 1 featuring G-Nut
- "The Rhyme" (1996) on Enigma (1996) by Keith Murray
- "Super Disco Breakin" on Hello Nasty (1998) by Beastie Boys
- "Undeniable" on True Magic (2006) by Mos Def
- "Supervillainz" on Born Like This (2009) by DOOM

=== Mix tape use ===
- Funkmaster Flex on The Mix Tape, Vol. II (1997)
- The Herbaliser on Herbal Blend (2003)

=== Multi-artist compilations ===
- Street Sounds Electro 4 (1984)
- The Hip Hop Box (2004)

=== Interpolations ===
- KRS-One on "Sound of da Police" (1993) from Return of the Boom Bap (1993)
- Snoop Dogg on "Hoop Dreams (He Got Game" (1999) from Who U Wit? (1999)

=== Other ===
- True Crime: New York City (2005)
- Scarface: The World Is Yours (2006)
- NBA 2K8 (2007)
- Saints Row 2 (2008)

== Credits ==
The following credits are listed in the Together Forever liner notes:

- Writers: N.S. Hardy Jr., T. Balfour, L. Smith, J. Simmons and D. McDaniels
- Producers: R. Simmons and L. Smith for Rush-Groove Productions
- Assistant Producer: Roddey Hui for Protoons, Inc./Rush-Groove/ASCAP

Additionally, the liner notes cite the following two references:

- Adler, Bill (2002). Tougher Than Leather: The Rise of Run-DMC. Consafos Press. ISBN 978-0-9656535-6-5.
- Adler, Bill (1991). Rap!: Portraits and Lyrics of a Generation of Black Rockers. St. Martin's Griffin. ISBN 978-0-312-05501-1.

== See also ==
- New school hip hop

== Bibliography ==
- Shapiro, Peter. Rough Guide to Hip Hop, 2nd. ed., London: Rough Guides, 2005. ISBN 978-1-84353-263-7
