= Crown Royal (album) =

Studio album by Run-DMC
- Released: April 3, 2001
- Recorded: 1997–1999
- Studio: 24/7 Recording Studio; Chung King Studios; Enterprise Recording Studios; Greene Street Studio; NRG Recording Studios; Toast Studios; Temple Of The Dog Detroit, MI; The Hit Factory, New York, NY
- Genre: Hip hop; rap rock; nu metal; rap metal
- Length: 43:49
- Label: Arista
- Producer: Run-DMC; Jam Master Jay; Randy Allen; LaMarquis "ReMarqable" Jefferson; DJ Lethal; Kid Rock; Dante Ross; John Gamble; John Carmer; Stephan Jenkins; Jermaine Dupri; Run (co-producer); DJ Homicide (co-producer)

Run-DMC chronology
Down With the King (1993)	Crown Royal (2001)	Greatest Hits (2002)

Singles from Crown Royal
- 1. "The Beginning (No Further Delay)" Released: 1998; 2. "Simmons Incorporated" Released: 1999; 3. "Crown Royal / Queens Day" Released: 1999; 4. "It's Over" Released: 2000; 5. "Rock Show" Released: January 2001; 6. "Let's Stay Together (Together Forever)" Released: February 2001

Crown Royal is the seventh and final studio album by American hip hop group Run-DMC, released on April 3, 2001, by Arista Records. It is the group's only album with a Parental Advisory label, though previous Run-D.M.C albums, such as 1986’s Raising Hell, had included explicit lyrics. All songs except the title track featured guest artists, including Fred Durst, Stephan Jenkins, Sugar Ray, Everlast, Kid Rock, Nas, Prodigy, Fat Joe and Method Man.

Crown Royal peaked at number 37 on the US Billboard 200, and number 22 on the Top R&B/Hip Hop Albums chart.

After DJ Jam Master Jay was murdered on October 30, 2002, the other group members, Joseph Simmons and Darryl McDaniels, announced the group's official disbanding a week later at a press conference called to unveil the formation of a coalition of music industry artists and a fund intended to financially assist Mizell's family.

== Release and promotion ==
Originally scheduled for October 12, 1999, the album's release was later postponed for the summer of 2000. The release of the album was further postponed, per representatives of the label, after managers of Kid Rock, Sugar Ray, Everlast, and Fred Durst refused to release their tracks as singles, which were originally intended as the album's lead singles. Subsequently, the album's release was postponed to February 13, 2001, then to March 6, and finally to April 3, 2001.

The song recorded together with Method Man, "Simmons Incorporated", was released on the single in 1998 as "The Beginning (No Further Delay)". The songs "Crown Royal" and "Queens Day" were released on the promo single in 1999. The album's main singles were "Rock Show" and "Let's Stay Together (Together Forever)", released in early 2001.

== Critical reception ==
Professional ratings
Aggregate scores
Source	Rating
Metacritic	43/100
Review scores
Source	Rating
AllMusic	1.5/5 stars
Alternative Press	2/5 stars
Entertainment Weekly	B−
The Guardian	2/5 stars
HipHopDX	3.5/5
NME	7/10
Pitchfork	4.1/10
Q	2/5 stars
Rolling Stone	3/5 stars
Spin	3/10

Crown Royal received mixed critical reviews. However, many critics have expressed their frustration at the lack of DMC participation. Some positive reviews have been published. Entertainment Weekly (4/6/01, p. 120) note that "on this hip-hop roast, new schoolers Nas and Fat Joe pay their respects with sparkling grooves... Run's rhymes are still limber." – Rating: B−

Rolling Stone (3/15/01, p. 78) said "Crown Royal uses the same musical strategy as their minor 1993 comeback, Down with the King: guest artists, guest artists and more guest artists... But as on Down With the King, Run-DMC prove their old-school mastery without adding anything new to it; the tracks sink or swim depending on what the guest artist felt like bringing to the studio that day."

HipHopDX gave Crown Royal three and a half stars out of five, saying "Crown Royal is definitely not a classic but it does provide a few jams that many will really love."

NME gave Crown Royal a 7 out of 10 rating: "Proves the emperors' new clothes can look just as solid as their old threads." However, AllMusic rated the album only one and a half stars out of five: "Crown Royal spirals so recklessly into contrasting segments that it's easy to forget you are even listening to a Run-D.M.C. record. Lacking any discernible sense of direction or continuity, the once cutting-edge trio has seemingly lost touch with its original fan base."

== Track listing ==
Crown Royal – Standard edition
No.	Title	Writer(s)	Producer(s)	Length
1.	"It's Over" (featuring Jermaine Dupri)	Joseph Simmons; LaMarquis Jefferson; Jermaine Dupri; Chris Davis; Carmine Coppola	Jefferson; Dupri	3:39
2.	"Queens Day" (featuring Nas and Prodigy of Mobb Deep)	Jason Mizell; Joseph Simmons; Randy Allen; Davis; Nasir Jones; Albert Johnson; Mary J. Blige; Samuel Barnes; Jean-Claude Olivier; LaTonya Blige; Chris Martin; Shawn Carter	Jam Master Jay; Allen; Run; Tadone Wilson; Mike Rapley	4:17
3.	"Crown Royal"	Joseph Simmons; Darryl McDaniels; Mizell; Allen; Davis; Charles Boone; Ernest Gold	Jam Master Jay; Allen; Run	3:13
4.	"Them Girls" (featuring Fred Durst of Limp Bizkit)	Mizell; Joseph Simmons; McDaniels; Davis; Fred Durst; DJ Lethal	Jam Master Jay; Allen; DJ Lethal	3:31
5.	"The School of Old" (featuring Kid Rock)	Robert Ritchie; Joseph Simmons; McDaniels; Davis; Russell Simmons; Larry Smith; Carlos Santana; David Margen; Dennis Lambert; Brian Potter; Greg Walker	Kid Rock	3:21
6.	"Take the Money and Run" (featuring Everlast)	Steve Miller	Dante Ross; John Gamble	3:48
7.	"Rock Show" (featuring Stephan Jenkins of Third Eye Blind)	Stephan Jenkins; Joseph Simmons; Davis; Robert Ginyard; McDaniels; Smith	Jenkins; Jason Carmer	3:14
8.	"Here We Go 2001" (featuring Sugar Ray)	Mizell; Joseph Simmons; McDaniels; Davis; Craig Bullock	Jam Master Jay; DJ Homicide	3:21
9.	"Ahhh" (featuring Chris Davis)	Joseph Simmons; Mizell; Allen; Davis	Jam Master Jay; Allen	4:20
10.	"Let's Stay Together (Together Forever)" (featuring Jagged Edge)	Joseph Simmons; Dupri; Jefferson; Davis; Al Green; Al Jackson Jr.; Willie Mitchell	Dupri; Jefferson	3:18
11.	"Ay Papi" (featuring Fat Joe)	Mizell; Joseph Simmons; McDaniels; Allen; Davis; Rodney Jones; Joseph Cartagena; Sherm Feller	Jam Master Jay; Allen	3:15
12.	"Simmons Incorporated" (featuring Method Man)	Joseph Simmons; McDaniels; Mizell; Allen; Davis; Smith; Clifford Smith; Kenneth James Cook; Mike Ransom; Jamel Simmons	Jam Master Jay; Allen; Run	4:26
Total length:				43:43

Crown Royal – Japanese edition (bonus track)
No.	Title	Writer(s)	Length
13.	"Walk This Way" (Run DMC Vs. Jason Nevins remix)	Steven Tyler; Joe Perry	3:59
Total length:			47:42

== Charts ==
Weekly chart performance for Crown Royal
Chart (2001)	Peak position
Australian Albums (ARIA)	48
Austrian Albums (Ö3 Austria)	51
German Albums (Offizielle Top 100)	39
Swiss Albums (Schweizer Hitparade)	40
US Billboard 200	37
US Top R&B/Hip-Hop Albums (Billboard)	22
