= Distortion (Joseph Simmons album) =

Studio album by Rev Run
- Released: October 18, 2005
- Recorded: 2003–2005
- Genre: Hip hop; rap rock
- Length: 25:27
- Label: RSMG; Island Def Jam; Def Jam
- Producer: Russell Simmons (exec.); Rev Run (also exec.); Whiteboy

Rev Run chronology
Distortion (2005)	Rewind (2014)

Distortion is the only solo studio album by American musician Joseph "Rev. Run" Simmons from hip hop group Run–D.M.C. It was originally scheduled to be released in 2003, but was delayed until its release date of October 18, 2005. Production was handled entirely by Whiteboy and Rev Run, who also served as executive producer together with his brother Russell Simmons. The album debuted at number 78 on the Top R&B/Hip-Hop Albums chart in the United States. Its lead single "Mind on the Road" peaked at number 98 on the Pop 100.

== Critical reception ==
Professional ratings
Aggregate scores
Source	Rating
Metacritic	61/100
Review scores
Source	Rating
AllMusic	3.5/5 stars
HipHopDX	2.5/5
Pitchfork	5.4/10
RapReviews	7/10

Distortion was met with generally favorable reviews from critics. At Metacritic, which assigns a weighted average rating out of 100 to reviews from mainstream publications, this release received an average score of 61, based on eight reviews.

Mojo reviewer wrote that Rev Run's "bellowed cadences are as timeless and elemental as the blues". AllMusic's David Jeffries wrote: "The skimpy run time is noticeable and downright perplexing coming from an album that ambitiously delivers otherwise". Steve 'Flash' Juon of RapReviews.com wrote: "I cautiously recommend Distortion to Run-D.M.C. fans as being a lot better than their unceremonious disaster of a final album Crown Royal while openly admitting anybody younger than 18 may not relate to it and pass right on by to something else". Q reviewer stated: "yet for all the nostalgia, the lurching strut of tracks such as "Boom Ditty" and "Breaktime" remains undeniably potent and contemporary".

In mixed reviews, Blender critic wrote: "despite the occasional misstep... it's a welcome album to anyone who wishes the past 15 years never happened to Run-D.M.C.'s legacy". Sean Fennessey of Pitchfork summarized with: "this album is almost a non-entity". Rolling Stone reviewer wrote: "a CD of biblical rap would have been vastly more interesting than just tepid updates of the Run-DMC sound".

In a negative review, Entertainment Weekly writer described the album as "an awkward attempt that neither improves upon nor updates the trio's original blueprint".

== Track listing ==
No.	Title	Writer(s)	Producer(s)	Length
1.	"I Used to Think I Was Run"	Joseph Simmons; Joseph Kuleszynski; Brian Harmon; Darryl McDaniels; George Clinton Jr.; Jason Mizell; Sidney Barnes; Theresa Lindsey	Whiteboy; Rev Run	3:07
2.	"Home Sweet Home"	J. Simmons; Kuleszynski; Al Green; Gary Rossington; Edward King; Ronnie Van Zant	Whiteboy; Rev Run	2:15
3.	"Boom Ditty"	J. Simmons; Kuleszynski; Alfred Scramuzza; Edwin Bocage; Gloria Jones; Pam Sawyer	Whiteboy; Rev Run	2:11
4.	"Breaktime"	J. Simmons; Kuleszynski; James Brown; John Cameron; John Zachary	Whiteboy; Rev Run	1:42
5.	"High and Mighty Joe"	J. Simmons; Kuleszynski; Matty Malneck; Michael Nesmith; Rob Maxwell	Whiteboy; Rev Run	2:04
6.	"The Way"	J. Simmons; Kuleszynski; Lawrence Smith; Paul Stanley; Russell Simmons	Whiteboy; Rev Run	2:19
7.	"Don't Stop Y'all"	J. Simmons; Kuleszynski; Barry Bailey; Michael Fleming; Christine Yarian Perren; Darryl Calloway; McDaniels; Frederick J. Perren; George Belton, Jr.; Mizell; Larry Miller; L. Smith; Reginald Payne; Richard Wyatt	Whiteboy; Rev Run	2:36
8.	"Mind on the Road"	J. Simmons; Kuleszynski; Allan Preston Sachs; Jerry Mamberg	Whiteboy; Rev Run	2:39
9.	"Take a Tour"	J. Simmons; Kuleszynski; Robert Luke Harshman; Christopher Stein; Angela Trimble; Sidney Thomas Boyce	Whiteboy; Rev Run	2:09
10.	"Distortion"	J. Simmons; Kuleszynski; Norman Stone; Patrick Daugherty; Rickie Reynolds; Ronnie Smith; Stanley Knight; William Jett	Whiteboy; Rev Run	4:25
Total length:				25:27

== Personnel ==
- Joseph "Run" Simmons – main artist, producer, executive producer
- Timothy Lavigne – bass (track 5), guitar (track 10)
- Joseph "Whiteboy" Kuleszynski – percussion (track 9), producer, recording, mixing (tracks: 2, 4, 5, 7)
- Biff – percussion (track 9)
- Justin Williams – management (production)
- Jason Goldstein – mixing (tracks: 1, 3, 6, 8–10)
- Howie Weinberg – mastering
- Russell Simmons – executive producer, A&R
- Louis Marino – art direction, design
- Nichell Delvaille – art coordinator, photography
- Joseph Cultice – photography
- Doug Joswick – packaging
- Adrienne Muhammad – A&R
- Tony Austin – A&R

== Charts ==
Chart (2005)	Peak position
US Top R&B/Hip-Hop Albums (Billboard)	78
