= Down with the King (song) =

Single by Run-DMC featuring Pete Rock & CL Smooth

from the album Down with the King
- B-side: "Down with the King (Instrumental)"
- Released: March 2, 1993
- Recorded: 1992
- Genre: Hip hop
- Length: 5:00
- Label: Profile
- Songwriters: Joseph Simmons; Darryl McDaniels; Corey Penn; Peter Phillips; James Rado; Gerome Ragni; Galt MacDermot
- Producer: Pete Rock

Music video
- "Down with the King" on YouTube

Run–D.M.C. singles chronology
"Faces" (1991)	"Down with the King" (1993)	"Ooh, Whatcha Gonna Do" (1993)

Music video
- "Down with the King" on YouTube

"Down with the King" is a song by American hip hop group Run-DMC, released in March 1993, by Profile Records, as the first single from their sixth studio album of the same name. (1993) It featured artists Pete Rock & CL Smooth, with Pete Rock producing the song. After three unsuccessful singles from the group's previous album, "Down with the King" became Run-D.M.C.'s second-biggest hit after "Walk This Way", peaking at No. 21 on the US Billboard Hot 100 and becoming their only single to reach the top spot on the Hot Rap Singles chart. The accompanying music video, which was directed by Marcus Raboy, received heavy airplay and featured cameos from Eazy-E, Redman, Kris Kross, Jermaine Dupri, Onyx, Salt-n-Pepa, KRS-One, EPMD, A Tribe Called Quest, De La Soul, MC Lyte, Kid Capri, Das EFX, P.M. Dawn and Naughty by Nature. The song contains samples of James Rado's "Where Do I Go" from the original Broadway cast recording of the rock musical Hair and Run–D.M.C.'s 1988 single "Run's House". Pete Rock and CL Smooth's verses contain reused lyrics from Run DMC's 1983 single "Sucker M.C.'s". "Down with the King" was certified Gold by the RIAA on May 11, 1993.

== Track listing ==
=== A-side ===
1. "Down with the King" – 5:00

=== B-side ===
1. "Down with the King" (instrumental) – 5:18
2. "Down with the King" (radio version) – 4:15

== Charts ==
=== Weekly charts ===
Chart (1993)	Peak position
Australia (ARIA)	81
Canada Retail Singles (The Record)	7
UK Singles (OCC)	69
US Billboard Hot 100	21
US Hot R&B/Hip-Hop Songs (Billboard)	9
US Hot Rap Songs (Billboard)	1
US Maxi-Singles Sales (Billboard)	12
US Rhythmic Airplay (Billboard)	33

=== Year-end charts ===
Chart (1993)	Position
US Hot R&B/Hip-Hop Songs (Billboard)	84
