= Champtown =

American rapper and DJ

- Born: Brian Harmon; January 20, 1973 (age 53)
- Origin: Detroit, Michigan, US
- Genres: Hip hop
- Occupations: Rapper; disc jockey; director; teacher
- Years active: 1988–present
- Label: Straight Jacket

Brian Harmon (born January 20, 1973), better known by his stage name Champtown, is an American rapper, disc jockey, film director and teacher from Detroit, Michigan. Founder of the Straight Jacket independent record label, Champtown is known for helping establish the careers of a number of Detroit hip hop artists, including Kid Rock. He has also worked with Ice-T, Rev Run, Public Enemy and Uncle Kracker. He produced a documentary film, The Untold Story of Detroit Hip Hop, which featured interviews with notable Detroit rappers.

== Biography ==
Harmon grew up on Fairport Street in the East Side neighborhood of Detroit, and attended Detroit Boys and Girls Club with the drug dealers Best Friends. Attending the Boys and Girls Club, Harmon was the subject of much racism. Harmon's older half brother, John, took him to his first hip hop music concert, the Fresh Fest, at the age of 8, leading Harmon to become enamored with the genre. In the second grade, Harmon met future rapper Esham, and the two performed together at open mic events at Seafood Bay. In one occurrence, Harmon and Esham were forced to rap for a drug dealer at gunpoint. Although he was kicked out of high school, Harmon earned his GED at the age of 15, and began a professional music career. Through his manager, local DJ Blackman, Harmon became friends with a young Kid Rock, and was a member of the local hip hop group The Beast Crew, with Blackman, KDC, Chris "Doc Roun-Cee" Pouncy and Kid Rock. The Beast Crew split after Kid Rock signed with Jive Records, and Harmon formed the Straight Jacket independent record label in 1990. The label operates under a strong DIY ethic.

Eminem made his music video debut in Harmon's 1992 video for "Do-Da-Dipity", but they later had a falling out, resulting in Soul Intent, Eminem's group, producing the record "Fuckin' Backstabber". A later Harmon video, "Bang Bang Boogie", featured appearances by Chuck D and Flavor Flav of Public Enemy. In 2001, Straight Jacket signed a national distribution deal with Sumthing Distribution. In 2005, Harmon wrote the song "I Used to Think I Was Run" for Rev Run's solo album Distortion.

In 2009, Harmon joined the Institute of Production & Recording as a teacher. In 2011, Harmon began working on a documentary film, The Untold Story of Detroit Hip Hop. The film focuses on the city's hip hop music scene from 1982 to present, and highlights what Champtown considers to be underrepresented rappers such as Esham, Awesome Dre, Detroit's Most Wanted, Big Herk, Rock Bottom Entertainment, Street Lordz, Eastside Chedda Boyz, Royce da 5'9", Slum Village, Trick-Trick, Stretch Money, K Deezy, Verdict, J Dilla and Detroit Hit Squad, as well as chronicle the early days of pioneers such as Kid Rock, Insane Clown Posse and Eminem. Harmon has stated that he wanted to resolve his former issues with Eminem in order to keep his documentary historically accurate.

Harmon also created an underground interview series called "Footage fa dayz" where he films famous celebrities giving very raw interviews. A special sneak peek of the classic footage is available on allhiphop.com.

== Style and influences ==
Harmon's influences include Run-DMC and LL Cool J. Harmon was once known for performing in a jester's hat.

== Discography ==
=== Studio albums ===
1999	Now Or Never Nigga!: Released: 1999; Label: Straight Jacket Records (SJ-007); Format: CD
2016	Racial Profilin: Released: February 1, 2016; Label: Straight Jacket Records • Footage Fa Days; Format: MD

=== Extended plays ===
1991	Call Me Joker: Released: 1991; Label: Straight Jacket Records (SJ-001); Format: Cassette
1996	Check It!: Released: 1996; Label: Straight Jacket Records (SJ 003); Format: LP • CD
