= Christmas in Hollis =

Single by Run-DMC

from the album A Very Special Christmas
- B-side: "Peter Piper"
- Released: November 25, 1987
- Recorded: 1987
- Genre: Golden age hip hop; comedy hip hop; rap rock; Christmas
- Length: 2:59
- Label: A&M; Profile
- Songwriters: Joseph Simmons, Darryl McDaniels, Jason Mizell
- Producers: Rick Rubin, Run-DMC

Run-DMC singles chronology
"It's Tricky" (1987)	"Christmas in Hollis" (1987)	"I'm Not Going Out Like That" (1988)

Music video
- "Christmas in Hollis" on YouTube

"Christmas in Hollis" is a single by Run-DMC that was included on two 1987 Christmas compilation albums featuring various artists: A Very Special Christmas (A&M 3911) and Christmas Rap (Profile 1247). When Bill Adler first asked Run-DMC to contribute to A Very Special Christmas—the first in a series of various artists compilation albums produced to benefit the Special Olympics—they refused. After Bill—who was then the director of publicity for Rush Productions, which managed Run-DMC—gave the band the idea for "Christmas in Hollis", they changed their minds and agreed to be on the album. (Other contributing artists included Whitney Houston, Sting, Bruce Springsteen and the E Street Band, Madonna, and Bob Seger.) The track was produced by the group along with Rick Rubin and was originally released as a single in 1987 by A&M. In 2000, thirteen years after it was first released, it reached number 78 on the Billboard Hot R&B/Hip-Hop Songs chart.

The title refers to Hollis, Queens, the New York City neighborhood in which the members of Run-DMC grew up. The track samples Clarence Carter's 1968 holiday song "Back Door Santa", as well as "Frosty the Snowman", "Jingle Bells", and "Joy to the World" and features an Acme siren.

"Christmas in Hollis" was included as a bonus track on the deluxe edition of Tougher Than Leather.

== Music video ==
The music video for "Christmas in Hollis" takes place at the North Pole (although it was not filmed there) and in Hollis, Queens. At the end of the video, Santa is seen flying away with his sled being pulled by a dog. The video was directed by Michael Holman with cinematography by Mark Richardson, both NYU film students at the time, and features a cameo appearance by Bannah McDaniels, DMC's adoptive mother. "Christmas in Hollis" went on to win Rolling Stone's Best Video of the Year award in 1987, beating out Michael Jackson's "Bad" directed by Martin Scorsese.

== In popular culture ==
- The song was used in the movies Less than Zero (1987), Die Hard (1988), The Night Before (2015), How to Be Single (2016), The Grinch (2018), and Holiday Rush (2019).
- Run-DMC performed the song live in the 1987 A Very Special Christmas CBS TV special, and on the Christmas episode of All That.
- It was also used in the TV shows The Office, Everybody Hates Chris, Chuck, Brooklyn Nine-Nine, Ted Lasso, Lip Sync Battle, Orange Is the New Black, Hindsight, The Simpsons, and Hawkeye.
- The song was covered by The A.K.A.s, a punk rock band, in 2003.
- The song was sampled on a track called "Ballin' on Christmas," featuring Jim Jones, J.R. Writer, & Stack Bundles, and released as part of Jones' album "A Dipset X-Mas" in 2006.
- Kid Cholesterol produced a re-edited version of the song entitled "Christmas at Holly's" in 2010.
- The story of the making of the song was told at length by Joseph "Run" Simmons and Bill Adler in Mitchell Kezin's documentary film, "Jingle Bell Rocks" (2013).
- The song was used as part of UK catalogue retailers Argos' Christmas 2014 campaign.
- The song was used in the 2015 and 2018 Christmas ads for the Nissan automobile lineup.
- Eve covered this song on The Talk during the show's holiday special in 2019. During the performance her fellow co-hosts Carrie Ann Inaba performed a dance break and Sheryl Underwood paid homage to Jam Master Jay as Eve's DJ.
- On a 2016 episode of Saturday Night Live, a sketch premiered parodying "Christmas in Hollis" called "Jingle Barack", where Kenan Thompson as Rev. Run and musical guest Chance the Rapper as DMC rapped about the last Christmas of Barack Obama's presidency, with Leslie Jones contributing a verse in the style of Salt-N-Pepa and Daryl McDaniels appearing in a cameo. The song itself, under the name "Last Christmas", would be nominated for a Primetime Emmy Award for Outstanding Original Music and Lyrics.
- In a 2024 episode of Abbott Elementary, Janine Teagues, Jacob Hill, and Ava Coleman rap "Christmas in Hollis" at the step team practice.

== Track listing ==
=== A-side ===
1. "Christmas in Hollis"
2. "Walk This Way"

=== B-side ===
1. "Peter Piper"
2. "King of Rock"

== Charts ==
Chart (2016)	Peak position
UK Hip Hop/R&B (OCC)	31
US Holiday 100 (Billboard)	22
