= You Be Illin' =

"You Be Illin' "

Single by Run–D.M.C.

from the album Raising Hell
- B-side: "Hit It Run"
- Released: October 20, 1986
- Recorded: 1986
- Genre: Hip hop
- Length: 3:26
- Label: Profile
- Songwriters: Joseph Simmons; Darryl McDaniels; Jason Mizell; Raymond White
- Producers: Russell Simmons; Rick Rubin; Jason Mizell; Joseph Simmons

Run–D.M.C. singles chronology
| "Walk This Way" (1986) | "You Be Illin' " (1986) | "It's Tricky" (1987) |

"You Be Illin' " is the third single released by Run–D.M.C. from their third album, Raising Hell. It was released in 1986 through Profile Records as the follow-up to the rap rock crossover hit, "Walk This Way", and was produced by Run-D.M.C.

== Background ==
The slang term illing means to "be uncool and unrelaxed", "be acting crazy", "be 'tripping' or 'bugging' ", or "be acting 'wack' ". The song describes some examples of "illing" and chides a fictitious individual for his "illing" behavior. Such examples include a man ordering a Big Mac and french fries at a Kentucky Fried Chicken restaurant, calling out "Touchdown!" at a basketball game, repelling a woman at a party with drunken behavior and bad breath, and being oblivious to the fact he is eating dog food for dinner.

== Reception ==
Cash Box called it "a humorous poke at social faux pas and has the earmarks of becoming a huge novelty hit."

== Track listing ==
=== A-side ===
1. "You Be Illin' " – 3:26

=== B-side ===
1. "Hit It Run" – 3:10

== Charts ==
The song peaked at number 29 on the Billboard Hot 100 and number 12 on the Hot Black Singles chart.

| Chart (1986–1987) | Peak position |
|---|---|
| Belgium (Ultratop 50 Flanders) | 29 |
| Netherlands (Mega Single Tip) | 13 |
| US Billboard Hot 100 | 29 |
| US Hot Black Singles (Billboard) | 12 |
| US Hot Dance Club Play (Billboard) | 44 |

== Cover versions ==
- In 2012, The Carolina Chocolate Drops covered "You Be Illin' " on a bonus track of their album, Leaving Eden.
