= E. Bernard Jordan =

American preacher and author

Archbishop E. Bernard Jordan
- Born: June 11, 1959 (age 67); Brooklyn, New York, U.S.
- Education: Virginia Union
- Occupation: Pastor
- Years active: 1983-present
- Organization(s): Zoe Ministries (founder), P.O.M.E. Prophetic Order of Mar Elijah
- Known for: Prophetic Accuracy in people lives
- Notable work: See Published works
- Movement: Prosperity ministry
- Spouse: Debra Jordan (m. 1979)
- Children: Naomi Jordan Cook, Bethany Jordan, Joshua Jordan, Aaron Jordan, Yakim Manasseh Jordan
- Parent(s): Mary L. Jordan, Walter Jordan
- Website: BishopJordan.com, ZoeMinistries.com

Elijah Bernard Jordan (born June 11, 1959) better known as E. Bernard Jordan, is an American television evangelist, founder of Zoe Ministries, and writer of books on prosperity theology.

Jordan grew up in Brooklyn's Bedford-Stuyvesant area and believed he received his calling through a dream when he was 15 years of age. When he was 23 years of age he founded the Zoe Ministries in New York City. Jordan studied at the Tabernacle Bible Institute in Brooklyn and the Manhattan Bible Institute. Jordan received a purported Ph.D. from Friends International Christian University, an unaccredited mail order and online university. He also briefly attended Kepler College, an uncredited online, certificate granting institution, pursuing a degree in astrology. In 2019, Jordan earned a Master of Divinity degree from Samuel DeWitt Proctor School of Theology at Virginia Union University, a historical Black College and University. He also earned a Doctor of Ministry degree from Samuel DeWitt Proctor School of Theology at Virginia Union University in 2022.

Jordan was raised to the bishopric in 1994 by Roy E. Brown of the Pilgrim Assemblies International denomination.

The first edition of Jordan's The Laws of Thinking made the New York Times Best Seller list in 2007.

== Prosperity ministry ==
Initially Zoe Ministry services were conducted in a member's home, then in several New York City hotels before they were held in a theatre. His "Power of Prophecy" television show aired from 1991 to about 1997, when it became too expensive to maintain. His ministry is based upon the premise that if one sows money, such as contributions to his ministry, they will reap prosperity for themselves. In his book God is Not a Christian, Nor a Jew, Muslim, Hindu..., Carlton Pearson references Jordan's discussion of the inner spiritual divine as the essence of who we are, rather than our physical body as Jordan described in his book The Laws of Thinking.

Chicago Mayor Richard M. Daley honored Jordan for his ministerial work in 2007. Al Sharpton is numbered as one of his friends and he has celebrity mentees, such as Joseph "Reverend Run" Simmons of Run-DMC and MTV's Run's House, having named him "Protege of the Year Award" in 2004. The same day, symbolic of his "Prosperity Ministry", there was a "Rolls-Royce parade outside the Plaza Hotel in New York City, " featuring Jordan's Phantom Rolls-Royce. The new $325,000 Phantom had been a gift from Reverend Run as a "thank you" for his mentoring support.

Although he lives a life of luxury, he is sometimes dressed in a black, hooded robe, such as at Zoe Ministries retreats in Woodbourne, New York in the Catskill Mountains.

== Philanthropy ==
In 2025, Jordan donated eight million dollars to Virginia Union University, his alma mater, to create the Jordan Institute of Spiritual Technology and Digital Theology. The institute will be housed in the Samuel DeWitt Proctor School of Theology at Virginia Union.

== Criticisms ==
Critics of Jordan's work question his being labeled a "prophet" and question the monetary pledges for spiritual enlightenment.

== Lawsuits ==
A federal judge entered a default judgement against Jordan in 2019. This followed a year-long failure by Jordan to respond to a class suit action by Jeffrey Molitor who complained of robocalls from the ministry.

In a separate case in 2018, an Ohio woman also sued for compensation and punitive damages due to unauthorized robocalls and text messages from Manasseh Jordan Ministries. A corporation that provided phone services was sued Additional lawsuits have been filed in California.

== Personal ==
Jordan lived with his wife Debra and five children in a gated community, Tuxedo Park in Orange County, New York. Jordan now resides in a 26,000 square foot mansion in Saddle River, New Jersey. Jordan was connected with Reverend Frederick J. Eikerenkoetter II ("Reverend Ike"), a radio and television preacher who preached prosperity and "positive self-image psychology", who died in 2009.

== Published works ==
This is a partial list of Jordan's published works:

- 1973 – 10 Things Americans Wish They Had Known and 7 Things They Have to Know
- 1992 – The Power of Money
- 1994 – Spiritual Protocol
- 1995 – Keys to Liberation
- 1995 – The Power of the Dime
- 1995 – What Every Woman Should Know About Men
- 1995 – Written Judgements Volumes 1–4. Zoe Ministries, Inc.
- 1996 – The Achiever's Guide to Success
- 1996 – His Color Was Black: A Race Attack
- 1996 – The Spirit Of Liberation
- 2005 – "Cosmic Universe: The Universal Keys to Wealth"
- 2008 – The Laws of Thinking: 20 Secrets to Using the Divine Power of Your Mind to Manifest Prosperity. is a book that explains 20 Laws that govern God's operation on this earthly plane. Spanish version. French version.
- 2008 – The Business of Getting Rich (12 Secrets to Unveiling the Spiritual Side of Wealth In You).
- 2009 – Beyond the Laws of Thinking
- 2011 – The Laws of Prosperity

== See also ==
- Reverend Ike
- Joseph Simmons, Reverend Run
