= Soul Train Music Award for Best Rap Single =

Annual US music award

This page lists the winners and nominees for the Soul Train Music Award for Best Rap Single. The award was only given out during the first two ceremonies, before being retired in 1989.

== Winners and nominees ==
Winners are listed first and highlighted in bold.

=== 1980s ===
Year	Artist	Single	Ref
1987	**Run–D.M.C.**	**"Walk This Way"**	
1987	Joeski Love	"Peewee's Dance"	
1987	Timex Social Club	"Rumors"	
1987	Whodini	"One Love"	
1988	**LL Cool J**	**"I Need Love"**	
1988	Dana Dane	"Cinderfella Dana Dane"	
1988	The Fat Boys	"Wipeout"	
1988	Kool Moe Dee	"How Ya Like Me Now"	
