= Raising Hell (album) =

Studio album by Run-DMC
- Released: May 15, 1986
- Recorded: 1985–1986
- Studios: Chung King, New York City
- Genres: Hip-hop; rap rock
- Length: 39:46
- Label: Profile
- Producers: Russell Simmons; Rick Rubin

Run-DMC chronology
| King of Rock (1985) | Raising Hell (1986) | Tougher Than Leather (1988) |

Singles from Raising Hell
- 1. "My Adidas" Released: May 29, 1986; 2. "Walk This Way" Released: July 4, 1986; 3. "You Be Illin'" Released: October 21, 1986; 4. "It's Tricky" Released: February 8, 1987

Raising Hell is the third studio album by American hip-hop group Run-D.M.C., released on May 15, 1986, by Profile Records. The album was produced by Russell Simmons and Rick Rubin. Raising Hell is notable for being the first Platinum and multi-Platinum hip-hop record. The album was first certified Platinum on July 15, 1986, before it was certified as 3× Platinum by the Recording Industry Association of America (RIAA) on April 24, 1987. It is widely considered to be one of the greatest and most important albums in the history of hip-hop music and culture.

Raising Hell peaked at number three on the Billboard 200, and number one on the Top R&B/Hip Hop Albums (at the time known as the "Top Black Albums") chart, making it the first hip-hop album to peak atop the latter. The album features four hit singles: "My Adidas", "Walk This Way" (a collaboration with Aerosmith), "You Be Illin'" and "It's Tricky". "Walk This Way" is the group's most famous single, being a groundbreaking rap rock version of Aerosmith's 1975 song "Walk This Way". It is considered to be the first rap/rock collaboration that also brought hip-hop into the mainstream and was the first song by a hip-hop act to reach the top 5 of the Billboard Hot 100.

Raising Hell has been ranked as one of the greatest albums of all time. In 1987, it was nominated for a Grammy Award, making Run-D.M.C. the first hip-hop act to receive a nomination. In the same year, the album was nominated for Album of the Year and won Best Rap Album at the 1987 Soul Train Music Awards. In 2017, it was inducted into the National Recording Registry by the Library of Congress as being "culturally, historically, or aesthetically significant". The album was reissued by Arista Records in 1999 and 2003. An expanded and remastered edition was released in 2005 and contained five previously unreleased songs.

Selling more than three million copies, Raising Hell is credited with heralding the golden age hip-hop as well as hip-hop's album era, helping the genre achieve an unprecedented level of recognition among critics and mainstream audiences.

== Background ==
Returning home to Queens in late 1985 after their extensive touring, they soon put themselves on lockdown at Chung King studios in Manhattan for three months. In place of producer Larry Smith, a cocky new maverick was brought in: Rick Rubin. Even though Rubin's and Russell's names were on the production marquee, the two non-group members oversaw and added to the music on Raising Hell more than created it. "Rick and Russell got production credit, but we [the group members] really did everything", DMC states. "We did that album in like three months. It was so quick because every rhyme was written on the road and had been practiced and polished. We knew what we wanted to do. Rick was all music and instruments. Jay was music and DJing. And me and Run was lyrics. We definitely had a game plan."

Raising Hell features the well-known cover "Walk This Way" featuring Aerosmith (largely the work of its leaders, Steven Tyler and Joe Perry). While the song was not the group's first fusion of rock and hip-hop (the group's earlier singles "Rock Box" and "King of Rock" were), it was the first such fusion significantly impacting the charts, becoming the first rap song to crack the top 5 of The Billboard Hot 100. Raising Hell peaked at No. 1 on Billboard's Top R&B Albums chart as the first hip-hop/rap album to do so, and at No. 3 on the Billboard 200.

== Reception ==
Professional ratings
Review scores
| Source | Rating |
|---|---|
| AllMusic | 5/5 stars |
| Chicago Tribune | 4/4 stars |
| The Encyclopedia of Popular Music | 5/5 stars |
| Pitchfork | 7.7/10 |
| Q | 5/5 stars |
| Rolling Stone | 5/5 stars |
| The Rolling Stone Album Guide | 5/5 stars |
| Spin Alternative Record Guide | 10/10 |
| Uncut | 4/5 stars |
| The Village Voice | A− |

Raising Hell was voted fifth best album of 1986 in the Pazz & Jop poll of American critics nationwide, published by The Village Voice. Robert Christgau, the poll's creator, wrote in a contemporary review: "Without benefit of a 'Rock Box' or 'King of Rock,' this is [Run-D.M.C.'s] most uncompromising and compelling album, all hard beats and declaiming voices."

In the Los Angeles Times, Richard Cromelin wrote: "If the same old boasts are wearing thin and the misogyny gets grating, the beats are infectious and varied and the vocal trade-offs can be dazzling."

It ranked number 8 among the "Albums of the Year" in NME.

In 1987, the Soul Train Music Award for Best Rap - Single was jointly awarded to Run-D.M.C. and Aerosmith for "Walk This Way".

In 1989, the Toronto Star music critics took to look over the albums they had reviewed in the past 10 years to include in a list based on "commercial impact to social import, to strictly musical merit." Raising Hell was placed at number four on the list, describing it as "the record to move rap from the ghetto to the suburbs. Blame it or celebrate it, you can't deny Raising Hell's impact.

In 1998, the album appeared in The Source's 100 Best Rap Albums. Q magazine (12/99, p. 162) – 5 stars out of 5 – "... the apex of pre-Public Enemy, beatbox-based hip-hop, a monument of massive, crisp beats plus the genre-bending 'Walk This Way'." Vibe (12/99, p. 162) – Included in Vibe's 100 Essential Albums of the 20th Century. Uncut (11/03, p. 130) – 4 stars out of 5 – "[An album] that forced the music biz to take rap seriously." Rolling Stone (12/11/03, p. 126) – "[T]he pioneering trio took hip-hop into the upper reaches of the pop charts, introducing mainstream to a new urban thunder: rap rock." AllMusic – 5 stars out of 5 – "... the music was fully realized and thoroughly invigorating, rocking harder and better than any of its rock or rap peers in 1986 ..."

In 2003, the album was ranked number 123 on Rolling Stone magazine's list of the 500 greatest albums of all time, maintaining the rating in a 2012 revised list, dropping to number 209 in a 2020 reboot of the list. It ranked fourth on Chris Rock's list of the Top 25 Hip-Hop Albums of all time, and the comedian called it "the first great rap album ever".

In 2006, the album was chosen by Time as one of the 100 greatest albums. Time named it No. 41 of the 100 best albums of the past fifty years and stated that the album was "rap's first masterpiece".

In 2012, Slant Magazine listed the album at No. 65 on its list of "Best Albums of the 1980s".

Public Enemy's Chuck D considers Raising Hell to be the greatest hip-hop album of all-time, and the reason he chose to sign with Def Jam Records. "It paved the way for so many bands," he explained, "and opened minds." In Hip Hop Connection, he ranked the album at number one in his top ten (which also included Tougher Than Leather) and said: "It was the first record that made me realise this was an album-oriented genre."

== Track listing ==
Side one
| No. | Title | Writer(s) | Length |
|---|---|---|---|
| 1. | "Peter Piper" | | 3:25 |
| 2. | "It's Tricky" | Joseph Simmons, Darryl McDaniels, Jason Mizell, Rick Rubin | 3:03 |
| 3. | "My Adidas" | | 2:47 |
| 4. | "Walk This Way" (with Aerosmith) | Steven Tyler, Joe Perry | 5:11 |
| 5. | "Is It Live" | | 3:07 |
| 6. | "Perfection" | | 2:52 |

Side two
| No. | Title | Writer(s) | Length |
|---|---|---|---|
| 1. | "Hit It Run" | | 3:10 |
| 2. | "Raising Hell" | | 5:32 |
| 3. | "You Be Illin'" | Joseph Simmons, Darryl McDaniels, Jason Mizell, Raymond White | 3:26 |
| 4. | "Dumb Girl" | | 3:31 |
| 5. | "Son of Byford" | | 0:27 |
| 6. | "Proud to Be Black" | | 3:15 |

2005 deluxe edition CD bonus tracks
| No. | Title | Writer(s) | Length |
|---|---|---|---|
| 13. | "My Adidas" (a cappella) | | 2:31 |
| 14. | "Walk This Way" (demo) | Steven Tyler, Joe Perry | 5:25 |
| 15. | "Lord of Lyrics" | | 4:30 |
| 16. | "Raising Hell Radio Tour Spot" | | 0:52 |
| 17. | "Live at the Apollo Raw Vocal Commercial" | | 3:28 |

== Accolades ==
| Publication | Country | Accolade | Year | Rank |
|---|---|---|---|---|
| The Guardian | United Kingdom | 100 Albums that Don't Appear in All Other Top 100 Album Lists | 1999 | 45 |
| Record Collector | United Kingdom | Hip Hop: the American Urban Ghetto Finally Finds its Voice | 2005 | - |
| The New Nation | United Kingdom | Top 100 Albums by Black Artists | 2005 | 96 |
| The Guardian | United Kingdom | 1000 Albums to Hear Before You Die | 2007 | - |
| Q | United Kingdom | Ultimate Music Collection | 2016 | - |
| Q | United Kingdom | The Greatest Albums Of The Last 30 Years... 476 Modern Classics | 2016 | - |
| Rickey Vincent | United States | Five Star Albums from "Funk: The Music, the People, and the Rhythm of The One | 1996 | - |
| Rolling Stone | United States | The Essential 200 Rock Records | 1997 | - |
| The Source | United States | 100 Best Rap Albums | 1998 | - |
| Ego Trip | United States | Hip-Hop's Greatest Albums By Year 1979-85 | 1999 | 8 |
| Gear | United States | The 100 Greatest Albums of the Century | 1999 | 80 |
| Blender | United States | The 100 Greatest American Albums of All time | 2002 | 46 |
| Pitchfork | United States | The Top 100 Albums of the 1980s | 2002 | 43 |
| Rolling Stone | United States | 500 Greatest Albums of All Time | 2003 | 123 |
| Spin | United States | 100 Greatest Albums 1985–2005 | 2005 | 40 |
| Time | United States | Top 100 Albums of All Time | 2006 | - |
| Treble | United States | The Best Albums of the 80s, by Year | 2006 | 9 |
| Entertainment Weekly | United States | The 100 Best Albums from 1983 to 2008 | 2008 | 38 |
| Tom Moon | United States | 1000 Recordings to Hear Before You Die | 2008 | - |
| Chris Smith | United States | 101 Albums that Changed Popular Music | 2009 | - |
| Spin | United States | The 125 Best Albums of the Past 25 Years | 2010 | 38 |
| Robert Dimery | United States | 1001 Albums You Must Hear Before You Die | 2005 | - |
| bLisTerd | United States | The Top 100 Albums Of The 1980s | 2012 | 14 |
| Paste | United States | The 80 Best Albums of the 1980s | 2012 | - |
| Slant | United States | The 100 Best Albums of the 1980s | 2012 | 65 |
| XXL | United States | 40 Years of Hip-Hop: Top 5 Albums by Year | 2014 | - |
| Spin | United States | The 300 Best Albums of the Past 30 Years (1985–2014) | 2015 | 166 |
| The Village Voice | United States | Pazz & Jop: Top 10 Albums By Year, 1971-2017 | 2018 | 5 |
| Pause & Play | United States | Albums Inducted into a Time Capsule, One Album per Week | | 204 |

== Chart positions ==
=== Album ===
| Chart (1986) | Peak position |
|---|---|
| US Billboard 200 | 3 |
| US Top R&B/Hip-Hop Albums (Billboard) | 1 |
| Australian Kent Music Report Albums Chart | 50 |
| Canadian RPM Albums Chart | 32 |
| New Zealand RIANZ Album Chart | 8 |
| UK Albums Chart | 41 |

=== Singles ===
| Year | Single | Chart positions | | | | | | | | |
| Year | Single | US | US R&B | US Rap | US Dance | US Dance Sales | AUS | CAN | NZ | UK |
|---|---|---|---|---|---|---|---|---|---|---|
| 1986 | "My Adidas" | – | 5 | 33 | – | 10 | – | – | – | 62 |
| 1986 | "Walk This Way" | 4 | 8 | – | 6 | 13 | 9 | 6 | 1 | 8 |
| 1986 | "You Be Illin'" | 29 | 12 | – | 44 | – | – | – | – | 42 |
| 1987 | "It's Tricky" | 57 | 21 | – | 30 | 47 | – | – | – | 16 |

== Certifications ==
| Region | Certification | Certified units/sales |
|---|---|---|
| Canada (Music Canada) | Platinum | 100,000^{^} |
| New Zealand (RMNZ) | Gold | 7,500^{^} |
| United Kingdom (BPI) | Silver | 60,000^{^} |
| United States (RIAA) | 3× Platinum | 3,000,000^{^} |
^{^} Shipments figures based on certification alone.
