= My Adidas =

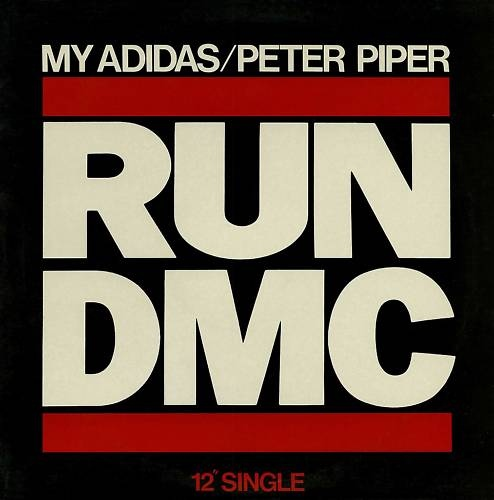

Single by Run–D.M.C.

from the album Raising Hell
- B-side: "Peter Piper"
- Released: May 29, 1986
- Recorded: 1985
- Genre: Hip hop; rap rock
- Length: 2:47
- Label: Profile Records
- Songwriters: Joseph Simmons, Darryl McDaniels
- Producers: Rick Rubin, Russell Simmons

Run–D.M.C. singles chronology
"Can You Rock It Like This" (1985)	"My Adidas" (1986)	"Walk This Way" (1986)

Music video
- "My Adidas" on YouTube

"My Adidas" is the first single from Run–D.M.C.'s third album Raising Hell. It is about Adidas footwear. Released in 1986, the song was written by two of the members, Joseph "DJ Run" Simmons and Darryl "DMC" McDaniels and was produced by Rick Rubin and Russell Simmons. It led to the first endorsement deal between a musical act and an athletic company, after the band's co-manager, Lyor Cohen, invited Adidas executive Angelo Anastasio to the band's concert at Madison Square Garden on July 19, 1986, where the band instructed the audience to hold up their Adidas apparel during the song. This was followed by the group making a video where they addressed Adidas with an a cappella verse before shouting "Give us a million dollars!" This deal is credited with influencing future endorsement deals between brands and musicians, particularly in hip hop culture.

"My Adidas" reached No. 5 on the Hot Black Singles and No. 10 on the Hot Dance Music/Maxi-Singles Sales in 1986, climbed to No. 33 on the Hot Rap Singles chart fourteen years later in 2000. The song appears on the soundtracks for the video games Tony Hawk's Pro Skater 4 (including reappearing in its remake) and Saints Row: The Third. The track was also mentioned in the song "Dedicated" from the Mariah Carey album Me. I Am Mariah... The Elusive Chanteuse.

== Background ==
"It was a song that was about our sneakers, but it was bigger than just talking about how many pairs of sneakers we had," DMC told MTV News. "It came from the place of people would look at the b-boys, the b-girls and go, 'Oh, those are the people that cause all the problems in here.' And, 'Those young people are nothing but troublemakers and those young people don't know nothing.' So they was judging the book by its cover, without seeing what was inside of it."
— Darryl McDaniels

== Legacy ==
Questlove ranked the song sixth on a 2012 list of the "50 Greatest Hip Hop Songs of All Time" in Rolling Stone. In an article accompanying the list, he calls the song "hip-hop's tipping point. No longer just music to annoy your grandparents, hip-hop meant big, big dollars. The gates were open: shows in stadiums, albums going multi-platinum, endorsement deals, awards and accolades. This 12-inch single was the Paul Revere announcement that hip-hop was going absolutely nowhere".

Bob Dylan played the song on the "Shoes" episode of his Theme Time Radio Hour show in 2007. Dylan introduced the song by saying, "I remember buying this next record when it came out, down at St. Mark's Records in New York. Actually I bought the twelve inch single, and it blew my mind. It was a powerful, exciting piece of music. Now when people listen to it, they think it's quaint and old fashioned. They're already condescending to it and turning it into an 'oldie'. That's the problem – people don't always realize how powerful the innovators are. Take someone like Chuck Berry. When his records came out they were dangerous. There was nothing like them on the radio, they were like a stampede. Now all these bands just play it louder and faster and don't really add anything to it. And so Chuck Berry, the creator, sounds 'quaint' and 'old fashioned'. They're doing the same thing to Run-DMC. Rap records have gotten louder, more camouflaged, faster and dirtier, with a thousand samples. Those records are colorful but it doesn't mean that Run DMC should just be considered 'oldies'. They're important pieces of art, and art isn't looked at as something old or new, it's looked at as something that moves ya. And here's a record that moves me."

== Track listing ==
=== A-side ===
1. "My Adidas" – 2:47
2. "Peter Piper" – 3:25

=== B-side ===
1. "My Adidas" (Instrumental) – 4:10
2. "Peter Piper" (Instrumental) – 3:15

== Charts ==
=== Weekly charts ===
Chart (1986)	Peak position
US Hot R&B/Hip-Hop Songs (Billboard)	5
