= Run's House (song) =

Single by Run-DMC

from the album Tougher Than Leather
- B-side: "Beats to the Rhyme"
- Released: April 15, 1988 (U.S.); May 9, 1988 (UK)
- Recorded: 1987
- Genre: Hip hop
- Length: 3:49
- Label: Profile
- Songwriters: Joseph Simmons, Darryl McDaniels, David Reeves
- Producers: Davy D, Run-DMC

Run-DMC singles chronology
"Mary, Mary" (1988)	"Run's House" (1988)	"Pause" (1989)

Music video
- "Run's House" on YouTube

"Run's House" is a single released by Run-DMC from their fourth studio album Tougher Than Leather. It was released in 1988 through Profile Records and was produced and written by the group and Davy D. "Run's House" was the highest-charting single from the album, making it to number ten on the Hot R&B/Hip-Hop Singles & Tracks chart. The track was later used as the theme song for Run's show Run's House and was sampled by the group for their hit single, "Down with the King".

The premise of the song is that no matter who is performing at a concert or wherever they go, Run-DMC owns the "house" and always heads the bill. Run makes references to the trio's influence on hip-hop with the lines "They said rap was crap/But never had this band" and "'Til the ruler came, with a cooler name/Made ya dance and prance and draw the fans insane." A music video for "Run's House" was filmed in New York City, showcasing the group performing in spots such as the Apollo Theater to a sea of fans.

== Track listing ==
=== 12" ===
A-Side

1. Run's House - 3:43
2. Beats to the Rhyme - 2:43

B-Side

1. Run's House (Instrumental) - 3:49
2. Beats to the Rhyme (Instrumental) - 2:43

=== CD-single ===
1. Run's House (Vocal) 3:44
2. Beats To The Rhyme (Vocal) 2:41
3. It's Tricky (Club Mix) 7:19 (Remix by Shep Pettibone)
4. Run's House (Instrumental) 3:46

=== 7" ===
A-Side

1. "Run's House" - 3:27; There is a variant of the 7" that cuts the song at 3:21

B-Side

1. Beats to the Rhyme" - 2:43

== Samples ==
"Run's House" was sampled by Royce da 5'9" in his song "I'm the King"

The song's intro is used as instrumental for the "BET Cyphers" that are performed by different artist with different lyrics every year since 2006 on the BET Awards.

The song has been sampled by Monica in her song "Gone Be Fine" featuring OutKast from her 1998 album The Boy is Mine.

== In popular culture ==
The hook of the song ("Whose house?/Run's House") is quoted by Loki (Matt Damon) in the Kevin Smith film Dogma. The song is also featured in Smith's film Chasing Amy. The hook has also been adapted into the catchphrase of American professional wrestler Swerve Strickland, who presents a call and response to the crowd: When he asks "Whose house?", the audience responds with "Swerve's house". The Los Angeles Rams also use a variation of the same phrase for their home games, the PA announcer will yell "Whose House?" and the fans will respond "Rams' House!"

== Charts ==
Chart (1988)	Peak position
Italy Airplay (Music & Media)	17
