= It's Tricky =

1987 single by Run-DMC

Single by Run-DMC

from the album Raising Hell
- B-side: "Proud to Be Black"
- Released: 1987
- Genre: Hip hop; rap rock
- Length: 3:03
- Label: Profile
- Songwriters: Joseph Simmons; Darryl McDaniels; Doug Fieger; Berton Averre
- Producers: Rick Rubin; Run-DMC

Run-DMC singles chronology
"You Be Illin'" (1986)	"It's Tricky" (1987)	"Christmas in Hollis" (1987)
"It's Like That" (1997)	"(It's) Tricky" (1998)	"Rock Show" (2001)

Music video
- "It's Tricky" on YouTube

"It's Tricky" is the fourth single released from Run-DMC's third album, Raising Hell. It was released early in 1987 through Profile Records and was co-produced by Rick Rubin and the group themselves. The song peaked at No. 57 on the U.S. Billboard Hot 100 and No. 21 on the Hot Black Singles chart. In the UK, the song reached No. 16 on the UK Singles Chart.

In 1998, American producer Jason Nevins remixed the song under the amended title "(It's) Tricky". This version peaked at No. 74 in the UK while Nevins' remix of Run-DMC's song "It's Like That" spent its fifth week at No. 1 on the UK Singles Chart. Nevins' remix also achieved top-40 placings in Australia, New Zealand, and continental Europe, including Finland, where it reached No. 1.

Two decades after the song's release, the Knack sued Run-DMC on the grounds that "It's Tricky" sampled their song "My Sharona" without permission. The case was settled in 2005.

== Background ==
Run-D.M.C's previous studio album King of Rock had established the group's fusion of hip-hop and hard rock, which blossomed further on Raising Hell. This was due in part to the presence of producer Rick Rubin, who utilized his knowledge of both rap and metal music to develop a track that combined elements of both genres. Rubin was also responsible for introducing samples of the Knack's "My Sharona", which AllMusic's Stephen Thomas Erlewine identified as a factor that enhanced the song's commercial viability. In addition to sampling "My Sharona", "It's Tricky" interpolates the entire vocal structure of "Mickey" by Toni Basil. The Knack sued Run-DMC over the track in 2006, and the lawsuit was settled out of court. One notable element of the song was its anti-drug lyrics such as "We are not thugs, we don't use drugs."

== Critical reception ==
Rolling Stone writer Mark Kemp remarked, "'It's Tricky' cribs the guitar part from the Knack's 'My Sharona,' a fatuous New Wave song, and turns it into vital street art." Pitchfork's Tom Breihan claimed, "Run and DMC had also stepped their rap game up; "It's Tricky" is basically as good as the two of them ever got, spitting quick-tongue witticisms and yelling booming threats with equal abandon." Time writer stated the song serves "to prove their ferocity." Commenting on the crossover appeal, AllMusic's stated, "Rubin loved metal and rap in equal measures and he knew how to play to the strengths of both, while slipping in commercial concessions that seemed sly even when they borrowed from songs as familiar as 'My Sharona.'"

== Music video ==
The music video features Penn and Teller hustling a group of people with a game of three-card Monte in front of the Rialto Theater in downtown Los Angeles. Run-DMC are called and shut their business down by winning every hand they play. Penn then asks the group if they can teach them to dance, which they do after insisting that Penn and Teller change their clothes. Six months later, Run-DMC show up for their gig in Japan, but are denied entry as Penn and Teller are already on stage impersonating them.

== Usage in media ==
The song is used in the promotional clip for the FX television series Snowfall, which began airing in July 2017. The original song appeared in the movies Road Trip, Can't Hardly Wait, Turbo, White Chicks, The Bounty Hunter, The Boss Baby: Family Business, Sonic the Hedgehog 2, and Jack and Jill, and in the television shows One Tree Hill, Criminal Minds, King of the Hill, in Chilling Adventures of Sabrina and in the video games WWE 2K16, Forza Horizon 3, Madden NFL 26, and SSX series, SSX Tricky in particular, being named after the song. In the One Fierce Beer Coaster by Bloodhound Gang, the song would be covered in their 7th track. It would also be featured in the compilation album Take a Bite Outta Rhyme: A Rock Tribute to Rap. The song was also covered by American nu metal band Stuck Mojo, where former singer Bonz and guitarist Rich Ward had guest-starred on the 2001 album Keep the Flow by Italian band Folder. In 2021, the song was sampled by Crazy Frog.

== Track listing ==
7-inch

- A. "It's Tricky" – 3:02
- B. "Proud to Be Black" – 3:14

12-inch

- A1. "It's Tricky" (Club Mix) – 7:19
- A2. "Up Tempo" – 2:35
- B1. "It's Tricky" (Remix) – 4:31
- B2. "It's Tricky" (Scratchapella) – 3:51
- B3. "Tricky Reprise" – 2:54
- B4. "Proud to Be Black" – 3:14

== Charts ==
=== Weekly charts ===
==== Original version ====
Chart (1987–1990)	Peak position
Europe (European Hot 100 Singles)	18
UK Singles (Official Charts)	16
US Billboard Hot 100	57
US Hot R&B/Hip-Hop Songs (Billboard)	21
West Germany (GfK)	28

==== Jason Nevins remix ====
Chart (1998)	Peak position
Australia (ARIA)	15
Austria (Ö3 Austria Top 40)	11
Belgium (Ultratop 50 Flanders)	25
Belgium (Ultratop 50 Wallonia)	31
Europe (Eurochart Hot 100)	25
Finland (Suomen virallinen lista)	1
France (SNEP)	98
Germany (GfK)	23
Hungary (Mahasz)	2
Iceland (Íslenski Listinn Topp 40)	13
Netherlands (Dutch Top 40)	23
Netherlands (Single Top 100)	34
New Zealand (Recorded Music NZ)	5
Norway (VG-lista)	5
Scottish Singles Sales (Official Charts)	75
Sweden (Sverigetopplistan)	30
Switzerland (Schweizer Hitparade)	22
UK Singles (Official Charts)	74
UK Dance (Official Charts)	9

=== Year-end charts ===
Jason Nevins remix

Chart (1998)	Position
Australia (ARIA)	88

== Certifications ==
Region	Certification	Certified units/sales
United Kingdom (BPI) Original version	Gold	400,000^{‡}
United States (RIAA)	2× Platinum	2,000,000^{‡}
^{‡} Sales+streaming figures based on certification alone.
