= Tougher Than Leather =

Studio album by Run-D.M.C.
- Released: May 17, 1988
- Recorded: 1987–1988
- Studios: Unique Recording Studios, New York City
- Genres: East Coast hip hop; hardcore hip hop; rap rock
- Length: 40:26
- Labels: Profile; Arista (reissue of the album since 1999)
- Producers: Run-D.M.C.; Davy D.; Rick Rubin

Run-D.M.C. chronology
Raising Hell (1986)	Tougher Than Leather (1988)	Back from Hell (1990)

Singles from Tougher than Leather
- 1. "I'm Not Going Out Like That" Released: January 24, 1988; 2. "Mary, Mary" Released: March 8, 1988; 3. "Run's House" Released: April 15, 1988

Professional ratings
Review scores
Source	Rating
AllMusic	4/5 stars
Robert Christgau	B+
Pitchfork Media	6.4/10
Rolling Stone	3/5 stars

Tougher Than Leather is the fourth studio album by American hip hop group Run-D.M.C., released on May 17, 1988, by Profile Records. The album was produced by the group members themselves, Davy D. and Rick Rubin.

While the new record did not maintain the same popularity as its predecessor, it obtained platinum status and spawned the favorites "Run's House" and "Mary, Mary". Despite being given a mixed reception at the time of its release, it is now hailed as a seminal classic in hip-hop and many see it as an underrated album.

Tougher Than Leather peaked at number 9 on the US Billboard 200, and number 2 on the Top R&B/Hip Hop Albums chart. The album was certified Platinum by the RIAA on July 19, 1988.

The album features three the Billboard singles: "Run's House", "Mary, Mary" and "I'm Not Going Out Like That". "Run's House" and "Mary, Mary" also hit the UK Singles Chart.

The album was reissued by Arista Records in 1999 and 2003. An expanded and remastered edition was released in 2005 and contained 4 previously unreleased songs.

== Background ==
The platinum-selling album, a follow-up to the group's big commercial breakthrough album 1986's Raising Hell, featured some of the group's classics like "Run's House", "Beats to the Rhyme", and a cover of The Monkees's "Mary, Mary". Tougher Than Leather was the group's fourth effort and blended in elements of not only rap but also rock n' roll and funk, making it their most varied effort to date alongside King of Rock. "Papa Crazy" is based on "Papa Was a Rollin' Stone" by The Temptations. The album was recorded at 5 studios in New York City: Chung King House Of Metal, Unique Recording Studios, Inc., Electric Lady Studios, Ian London Studios, Greene St. Recording.

In response to albums such as Eric B. & Rakim's Paid In Full, Public Enemy's It Takes A Nation Of Millions To Hold Us Back, and Boogie Down Productions' Criminal Minded and By All Means Necessary, the group made a distinct departure from their earlier work, as Jam-Master Jay used a heavier amount of sampling.

Run and DMC also made changes in their rapping style (heavily influenced by Rakim) as techniques such as alliteration, polysyllabic rhyming, and internal rhyme are found in songs like "I'm Not Going Out Like That," "Radio Station", and the title track. The group also introduces storytelling to their arsenal in "Ragtime". Despite this, Run-D.M.C. does not abandon their formula of combining hip-hop beats with hard rock guitar riffs, using it in "Miss Elaine", the title track, "Soul To Rock And Roll", and "Mary, Mary".

== Film ==
The album was accompanied by the release of a crime film of the same name by New Line Cinema with Rick Rubin as a director and starring Run-D.M.C. According to the plot Run-D.M.C. must find and punish the evil drug lord-record company executive who murdered their friend. Along the way, they encounter racist bikers, blonde bimbos, and the Beastie Boys. The film was released on September 16, 1988, and was panned by critics.

== Track listing ==
The information about samples was taken from WhoSampled.

#	Title	Samples	Length
1	"Run's House"	The Soul Searchers – "Ashley's Roachclip" (1974); James Brown – "Funky Drummer" (1970)	3:49
2	"Mary, Mary"	The Monkees – "Mary, Mary" (1966); John Davis and the Monster Orchestra – "I Can't Stop" (1976); Cover version of the song: The Monkees – "Mary, Mary" (1967)	3:12
3	"They Call Us Run-D.M.C."	Doug E. Fresh and Slick Rick – "La Di Da Di" (1985); Juice – "Catch a Groove" (1976); Run-D.M.C. – "Jam Master Jay" (1984)	2:56
4	"Beats To The Rhyme"	Bob James – "Nautilus" (1974); James Brown – "Talkin' Loud & Sayin' Nothing" (1972); Marva Whitney – "It's My Thing" (1969)	2:43
5	"Radio Station"	Coke Escovedo – "I Wouldn't Change a Thing" (1976); Gaz – "Sing Sing" (1978); Public Enemy – "Bring the Noise" (1987); LL Cool J – "Dear Yvette" (1985); LL Cool J – "I Can't Live Without My Radio" (1985)	2:50
6	"Papa Crazy"	The Temptations – "Papa Was a Rollin' Stone" (1972)	4:18
7	"Tougher Than Leather"	Kurtis Blow – "AJ Scratch" (1984); Run-D.M.C. – "Together Forever (Krush-Groove 4) (Live at Hollis Park '84)" (1985)	4:20
8	"I'm Not Going Out Like That"	Public Enemy – "Rebel Without a Pause" (1987); Public Enemy – "Bring the Noise" (1987); Heavy D & The Boyz – "The Overweight Lover's in the House" (1987); Run-D.M.C. – "It's Like That" (1984); Martin Luther King Jr. – "I've Been to the Mountaintop" (1968, the day before his assassination)	4:55
9	"How'd Ya Do It Dee"	The Meters – "Here Comes the Meter Man" (1969)	3:20
10	"Miss Elaine"		3:05
11	"Soul To Rock And Roll"	Chubb Rock – "Rock 'N Roll Dude" (1987); Run-D.M.C. – "King of Rock" (1985); Run-D.M.C. – "Hit It Run (1986)	2:17
12	"Ragtime"		2:42

"Beats To The Rhyme" is edited on all pressings. The explicit version can be found on the "Run's House" 12 inch single & on the compilation "Together Forever: Greatest Hits 1983–1991".

=== Deluxe edition bonus tracks ===
The information about bonus tracks was taken from a booklet of 2005 expanded deluxe edition.

#	Title	Description	Length
13	"Beats To The Rhyme (Instrumental)"	B-side of "Run's House" (1988); Previously Unreleased on CD	2:44
14	"Crack (Demo)"	Recorded November 30, 1986; Previously Unreleased; When the reel was found for this demo it said "Crack (For Michael Jackson)" on the box, but according to Run the track was never intended to MJ. "We had only met with Michael for once. We had this crazy idea that reminded me of Force MC's (later became Force MD's) and Dot-A-Rock (Fantastic 5 & Cold Crush Brothers). It sounded like Flash on the beat box and the way Jesse D from the Force MC's would sing like Michael over a fly beat box." – Run	1:43
15	"Christmas In Hollis"	Recorded September 29, 1987; Previously released on A Very Special Christmas & Christmas Rap; "Bill Adler called one morning and told me that we had to make a record for the Special Olympics. I was in a creative mood and wrote the whole record while eating breakfast. I even got jelly on the paper. That night Bill brought an armful of Christmas records that we ended up sampling for it." – Run; Sample: Clarence Carter – "Back Door Santa" (1968); Sample: Isaac Watts – "Joy to the World" (1719)	2:58
16	"Penthouse Ad"	Recorded February 11, 1987 for the April 1987 issue of Penthouse; Recorded For Tilley Marlieb Advertising; Previously Unreleased on CD; This radio spot was recorded for their interview that appeared in Penthouse Magazine	0:58

== Charts ==
=== Weekly charts ===
Weekly chart performance for Tougher Than Leather
Chart (1988)	Peak position
Australian Albums (ARIA)	38
Canada Top Albums/CDs (RPM)	51
Dutch Albums (Album Top 100)	46
European Albums (European Top 100 Albums)	44
Finnish Albums (Suomen virallinen lista)	33
German Albums (Offizielle Top 100)	46
New Zealand Albums (RMNZ)	43
Swedish Albums (Sverigetopplistan)	35
Swiss Albums (Schweizer Hitparade)	28
UK Albums (Official Charts)	13
US Billboard 200	9
US Top R&B/Hip-Hop Albums (Billboard)	2

=== Year-end charts ===
1988 year-end chart performance for Tougher Than Leather
Chart (1988)	Position
US Billboard 200	70
US Top R&B/Hip-Hop Albums (Billboard)	31

== Certifications ==
Sale certifications for Tougher Than Leather
Region	Certification	Certified units/sales
Canada (Music Canada)	Gold	50,000^{^}
United States (RIAA)	Platinum	1,000,000^{^}
^{^} Shipments figures based on certification alone.
