= Mary, Mary (song) =

Monkees song

Song by the Paul Butterfield Blues Band

from the album East-West
- Released: August 1966
- Recorded: 1966
- Genre: Blues rock
- Length: 2:48
- Label: Elektra
- Songwriter: Michael Nesmith
- Producer: Barry Friedman

"Mary, Mary" is a song written by Michael Nesmith and first recorded by the Paul Butterfield Blues Band for their 1966 album East-West. Nesmith's band, the Monkees, later recorded it for More of the Monkees (1967). Hip hop group Run–D.M.C. revived the song in the late 1980s, with an adaptation that appeared in the U.S. record charts.

== The Butterfield Blues Band ==
In 1966, Elektra Records was entering the singles market with new rock acts such as Love and the Doors. Hoping that the Paul Butterfield Blues Band would produce a hit, Elektra arranged an extended stay and recording sessions for the group in Los Angeles during the summer. It was there that producer Barry Friedman suggested that the group try a song written by guitarist Michael Nesmith of the Monkees, a group with which Friedman had been working. Butterfield guitarist Mike Bloomfield recalled:

We got real hot for a while to cut commercial records ... We went with these guys who used to cut records for the Stones, Bruce Botnick and Dave Hassinger. We cut "Mary, Mary" and a song called "If I Had My Way", which never came out. All sorts of weird attempts to make rock 'n' roll singles. We really wanted to do that, but it never happened.

According to Bloomfield biographer David Dann, "the song was given a muscular arrangement that included backup vocals, overdubbing, fuzz-tone effects, and dramatic stops." It also included brief solos by Bloomfield and by Butterfield on harmonica but "was clearly intended for Top 40 airplay." However, Elektra did not release the song as a single.

"Mary, Mary" was included on the influential Butterfield album East-West in August 1966. The album included the group's adaptations of several older blues songs, which did not list the songwriters, and "Mary, Mary" also lacked a composer credit. After the Monkees' version was released, Butterfield fans complained to Elektra that Nesmith was taking the writer's credit for the song, but Elektra president Jac Holzman assured them that Nesmith did indeed write it.

== The Monkees ==
"Mary, Mary"

Single by the Monkees

from the album More of the Monkees
- B-side: "What am I Doing Hangin' 'Round?"
- Released: 1968
- Recorded: July 25, 1966
- Studio: Western Recorders, Hollywood, California
- Genre: Garage rock
- Label: RCA Australia
- Songwriter: Michael Nesmith
- Producer: Michael Nesmith

On July 25, 1966, Nesmith produced and recorded the song for the Monkees at Western Recorders in Hollywood, California. Micky Dolenz sang lead, and Nesmith used the crack group of session musicians known as the Wrecking Crew, along with Monkees bassist Peter Tork on guitar, to bolster the Monkees' sound, including James Burton, Glen Campbell, Al Casey, Hal Blaine, Jim Gordon, Michael Deasy and Larry Knechtel. The Monkees' version was included on the album More of the Monkees in 1967.

The Monkees' "Mary, Mary" was not released as a single in the U.S. in the 1960s, although it was distributed as a cereal-box prize in 1969. It was, however, released as a single in Australia to coincide with the Monkees 1968 tour there and went to #4 in the Australian charts.

=== Personnel ===
Sourced from AFM contract.

- Lead vocal by Micky Dolenz
- Guitar: Peter Tork, James Burton, Glen Campbell, Al Casey, Michael Deasy and Don Peake
- Piano: Michael Cohen
- Bass: Larry Knechtel and Bob West
- Drums: Hal Blaine and Jim Gordon
- Percussion: Gary Coleman

== Run-D.M.C. version ==
"Mary, Mary"

Single by Run-D.M.C.

from the album Tougher Than Leather
- B-side: "Rock Box"
- Released: March 8, 1988
- Recorded: 1987
- Genre: Hip hop, rap rock
- Length: 3:12
- Label: Profile Records
- Songwriter: Michael Nesmith
- Producers: Rick Rubin, Run-D.M.C.

Run-D.M.C. singles chronology
"I'm Not Going Out Like That" (1988)	"Mary, Mary" (1988)	"Run's House" (1988)

Music video
- "Mary, Mary" on YouTube

Run-D.M.C. covered "Mary, Mary" in a rap rock version. It was released as a single from their fourth album, Tougher Than Leather, in 1988. It was released by Profile Records and produced by the group along with Rick Rubin. It was their most successful single from the album, and was the only one to reach the Billboard Hot 100, peaking at #75, and it reached #29 on the Hot Black Singles chart.

Run-D.M.C. changed the line "Mary, Mary, where ya' goin' to?" to "Mary, Mary, why ya' buggin'?". Although Run-D.M.C. replaced Nesmith's original lyrics with their own, Nesmith was the only writer credited on Run-D.M.C.'s single. Their version samples Dolenz singing the title from the Monkees' recording.

=== Track listing ===
A-side

1. "Mary, Mary" – 3:12

B-side

1. "Mary, Mary" (Instrumental) – 3:12
2. "Rock Box" – 5:28

=== Chart history ===
Chart (1988)	Peak position
New Zealand (Recorded Music NZ)	14
UK Singles Chart	86
U.S. Billboard Hot 100	75
U.S. Billboard Hot Dance Music-Club Play	18
U.S. Billboard Hot Black Singles	29
