= Davy DMX =

American musician

- Also known as: Davy D.
- Born: David Franklin Reeves Jr. October 3, 1960 (age 66); The Bronx, New York City, U.S.
- Genres: Breakbeat; old school hip hop
- Occupations: Musician; DJ; producer
- Labels: Tuff City; Def Jam
- Formerly of: Public Enemy

David Franklin Reeves Jr. (known professionally as Davy DMX, Davy D, or Davy Dee) is an American musician, DJ, and producer best known for his work in cooperation with Run-DMC, Kurtis Blow, the Fat Boys, and Jam Master Jay. An early associate of Russell Simmons and Larry Smith, Dave first made his name in the 1980s.

He also toured with Public Enemy as a bassist.

== Early life ==
Davy DMX was born in the Bronx borough of New York City on October 3, 1960. When he was ten years old, he moved with his family to Hollis, Queens, a largely African-American community notable as the home of such world-class achievers as Andrew Young, the Rev. Al Sharpton, Lani Guinier, Milt Jackson, Run-DMC, and DJ Hurricane.

Of his musical education, Dave has said, "I always liked the Jackson 5 when I was young, so I got a guitar and taught myself how to play." Eventually, he also taught himself how to play bass, keyboards, and drums. At the dawn of hip-hop in the mid-70s, Dave taught himself how to deejay. He formed a local rap group in Hollis named Solo Sounds, which included DJ Hurricane and others. Davy produced songs for Run-DMC, the Fat Boys, Kurtis Blow, Spoonie Gee, Jimmy Spicer, the Afros, and the Fearless Four. In 1979, Dave began touring as the DJ for Kurtis Blow, who was managed by Hollis native Russell Simmons. The gig with Blow, which Dave performed through 1983, included a handful of dates in September 1980 on a bill with Commodores and Bob Marley at Madison Square Garden.

== Career as an artist ==
In 1982 Dave, playing guitar, joined bassist Larry Smith and drummer Trevor Gale in a band called Orange Krush. Their first single, "Action," featuring vocals by Alyson Williams, was released that same year. A stark, beat-heavy production, "Action" was not a hit but proved very influential. In 1983 its basic rhythm was repurposed as the "Krush Groove" on Run-DMC's "Sucker MC's (Krush Groove 1)," and again on "Hollis Crew (Krush-Groove 2)" (1984), "Darryl & Joe (Krush-Groove 3)" (1985), and "Together Forever (Krush-Groove 4)" (1985). As of 2025, various parts of "Action" had been sampled at least 90 times, including on recordings by Jay-Z, Kanye West, Common, De La Soul, Michael Jackson, LL Cool J, Ol' Dirty Bastard, and T-Pain. Orange Krush also provided the music for Lovebug Starski's "You've Gotta Believe" in 1983.

Dave debuted as a solo artist late in 1983, cutting "One for the Treble (Fresh)" as Davy DMX for Aaron Fuchs' Tuff City Records. (Having used the Oberheim DMX drum machine to make the beats for many of his productions, he chose to call himself Davy DMX when it came time to record under his own name.) Primarily a hip hop instrumental, "One for the Treble" was reviewed by Eric Schmuckler for The Village Voice in May 1984, who wrote, "Davy finds unusual sound fragments to scratch against the beat, like heavily processed voices and the soon-to-be-widely-imitated squealing tires which bring the record to a screeching halt." Dave's second single for Tuff City, "The DMX Will Rock" (featuring the rapper Sweet Tee), was released in 1985.

Dave's first and only full-length album, Davy's Ride, was released by Def Jam Recordings in 1987. Reviewer Mark Sinker, writing for England's New Musical Express, described Davy as "the Hitchcock of hip-hop: sex'n'violence plots are all devices to hang unlikely technical tricks on," adding, "[Davy's Ride] is the weirdest, most viciously imaginative LP rap's going to deliver for some time". A month earlier, the New York Post's Brian Chin declared that the album constituted "more proof that rap is this decade's most accessible pop art".

== Career as a producer ==
Dave's work as a session musician, songwriter and producer grew out of his touring gig with Kurtis Blow. He contributed backing vocals to Blow's "Hard Times" in 1981 and played guitar on "Starlife" (1981), "Tough" (1982), and "Daydreamin'" (also '82). Between 1983 and 1985, Dave was the co-writer of several recordings produced by Blow. These include Sweet G's "Games People Play" and two tracks by the Fat Boys: "Jail House Rap" and "Hard Core Reggae."

In 1983, Dave teamed up with Larry Smith and Russell Simmons to write the music for the rapper Jimmy Spicer's "Money (Dollar Bill Y'All)." An influential recording, the track had been sampled at least 46 times as of 2025, including in recordings by Wu-Tang Clan, Montell Jordan, Mary J. Blige, Kanye West, DJ Quik, Too Short, and Maino. In 1997, the song was covered by Coolio.

Dave's first credit as a producer was on a record by Spoonie Gee, his Tuff City label-mate, in 1983. Titled "The Big Beat," it was followed by "Street Girl" in 1985, another Davy DMX production. It was also in 1985 that Dave produced "Transformation" for Dr. Jeckyll & Mr. Hyde. A year later, Dave teamed up with Spyder-D, another native of Hollis, to produce "Don't Make Me Laugh" for Sparky D. In 1987, Dave wrote the music for Stephanie Mills' "Can't Change My Ways," a recording he co-produced with Russell Simmons.

Dave's most notable credit as a producer is for Run-DMC's Tougher Than Leather (1988), the platinum-level follow-up to Run-DMC's triple-platinum Raising Hell. He also co-wrote "Run's House", "Beats to the Rhyme", "Radio Station", and "How'd You Do It Dee". The following year Dave co-produced several recordings with Jam Master Jay, starting with Run-DMC's "Ghostbusters/Pause" in 1989, and continuing with "Feel It" for The Afros in 1990.

In 1989, he helped produce Rasta Man for Vanilla Ice. In 1992 Dave played bass on Public Enemy's "Hazy Shade of Criminal". In 1994, he co-produced "Back Up Off Me", the title track from the album by Doctor Dré & Ed Lover.

== 21st century ==
Since 2010, Davy has been touring with Public Enemy as their lead bass player. This gig has included at least two stints on LL Cool J's Kings of the Mic Tour alongside De La Soul and Ice Cube.
