= Walk This Way =

1975 single by Aerosmith

Single by Aerosmith

from the album Toys in the Attic
- B-side: "Round and Round"; "Uncle Salty" (re-release)
- Released: August 28, 1975 (original); November 5, 1976 (re-release)
- Recorded: January–February 1975
- Studio: Record Plant, New York City
- Genre: Hard rock; funk rock
- Length: 3:40
- Label: Columbia
- Songwriters: Steven Tyler; Joe Perry
- Producer: Jack Douglas

Aerosmith singles chronology
"Sweet Emotion" (1975)	"Walk This Way" (1975)	"You See Me Crying" (1975)

Aerosmith re-release singles chronology
"Home Tonight" (1976)	"Walk This Way" (1976)	"Back in the Saddle" (1977)

Audio video
- "Walk This Way" on YouTube

"Walk This Way" is a song by the American rock band Aerosmith. Written by Steven Tyler and Joe Perry, the song was originally released as the second single from the album Toys in the Attic (1975). It peaked at number 10 on the Billboard Hot 100 in early 1977, part of a string of successful hit singles for the band in the 1970s. In addition to being one of the songs that helped break Aerosmith into the mainstream in the 1970s, it also helped revitalize their career in the 1980s when it was covered by hip-hop group Run-D.M.C. (in collaboration with Aerosmith) on their 1986 album Raising Hell. This cover was a touchstone for the new musical subgenre of rap rock, or the melding of rock and hip-hop. It became an international hit, reaching number 4 on the Billboard charts, and won both groups a Soul Train Music Award for Best Rap Single in 1987 Soul Train Music Awards. Both versions are in the Grammy Hall of Fame.

== Production ==
=== Music ===
The song starts out with a two measure drum beat intro by Joey Kramer, followed by a guitar riff composed by Joe Perry. The song proceeds with the main riff, with Perry and Brad Whitford on guitar with Tom Hamilton on bass. The song continues with rapid fire lyrics by Steven Tyler.

In December 1974, Aerosmith opened for the Guess Who in Honolulu. During the sound check, guitarist Joe Perry was "fooling around with riffs and thinking about the Meters," a group guitarist Jeff Beck had turned him on to. Loving "their riffy New Orleans funk, especially 'Cissy Strut' and 'People Say'", he asked the drummer "to lay down something flat with a groove on the drums." The guitar riff to what would become "Walk This Way" just "came off [his] hands." Needing a bridge, he:

...played another riff and went there. But I didn't want the song to have a typical, boring 1, 4, 5 chord progression. After playing the first riff in the key of C, I shifted to E before returning to C for the verse and chorus. By the end of the sound check, I had the basics of a song.

=== Lyrics ===
When bandmate Steven Tyler heard Perry playing that riff, he "ran out and sat behind the drums and [they] jammed." Tyler scatted "nonsensical words initially to feel where the lyrics should go before adding them later."

When the group was halfway through recording Toys in the Attic in early 1975 at Record Plant in New York City, they found themselves stuck for material. They had written three or four songs for the album, having "to write the rest in the studio." They decided to give the song Perry had come up with in Hawaii a try, but it did not have lyrics or a title yet. Deciding to take a break from recording, band members and producer Jack Douglas went down to Times Square to see Mel Brooks' Young Frankenstein. Returning to the studio, they were laughing about Marty Feldman telling Gene Wilder to follow him in the film, saying "walk this way" and limping. Douglas suggested this as a title for their song. But they still needed lyrics.

At the hotel that night Tyler wrote lyrics for the song, but left them in the cab on the way to the studio next morning. He says: "I must have been stoned. All the blood drained out of my face, but no one believed me. They thought I never got around to writing them." Upset, he took a cassette tape with the instrumental track the band had recorded and a portable tape player with headphones and "disappeared into the stairwell." He "grabbed a few No. 2 pencils" but forgot to take paper. He wrote the lyrics on the wall at "the Record Plant's top floor and then down a few stairs of the back stairway." After "two or three hours" he "ran downstairs for a legal pad and ran back up and copied them down."

Perry thought the "lyrics were so great," saying that Tyler, being a drummer, "likes to use words as a percussion element." He says:

The words have to tell a story, but for Steven they also have to have a bouncy feel for flow. Then he searches for words that have a double entendre, which comes out of the blues tradition.

Perry always liked to wait until Tyler recorded his vocal so he "could weave around his vocal attack," but Tyler wanted Perry to record first for the same reason. After a "tug-of-war", Tyler's vocal was recorded first with Perry's guitar track overdubbed.

The lyrics, which tell the story of a high school boy losing his virginity, are sung quite fast by Tyler, with heavy emphasis being placed on the rhyming lyrics (e.g., "so I took a big chance at the high school dance").

Between the elaborately detailed verses, the chorus primarily consists of a repetition of "Walk this way, talk this way".

Live in concert, Tyler often has the audience, combined with members of the band, sing "talk this way". There is also a lengthy guitar solo at the end of the song, and in concert, Tyler will often use his voice to mimic the sounds of the guitar.

== Reception ==
Cash Box said that "Steve Tyler's vocal is aggressive, gritty and right on as he literally spits out a slew of lyrics while never losing clarity" and that "the music itself is hardboiled rock." Record World said that "the pattern that sent 'Dream On' up the charts is again being established." In 2022, it was included in the list "The story of NME in 70 (mostly) seminal songs", at number 26.

== Personnel ==
- Steven Tyler – lead and backing vocals, percussion
- Joe Perry – lead guitar, slide guitar, backing vocals
- Brad Whitford – rhythm guitar
- Tom Hamilton – bass guitar
- Joey Kramer – drums

== Charts ==
=== Weekly charts ===
Weekly chart performance for Aerosmith's original recording
Chart (1976–1977)	Peak position
Australia (Kent Music Report)	85
Canada Top Singles (RPM)	7
US Billboard Hot 100	10
US Cash Box Top 100	7

=== Year-end charts ===
1977 year-end chart performance for Aerosmith's original recording
Chart (1977)	Rank
Canada Top Singles (RPM)	77
US Billboard Hot 100	90
US Cash Box	72

== Certifications ==
Sales certifications for Aerosmith's original recording
Region	Certification	Certified units/sales
Denmark (IFPI Danmark)	Platinum	90,000^{‡}
Germany (BVMI)	Gold	250,000^{‡}
New Zealand (RMNZ)	Platinum	30,000^{‡}
United Kingdom (BPI)	Gold	400,000^{‡}
United States (RIAA)	2× Platinum	2,000,000^{‡}
^{‡} Sales+streaming figures based on certification alone.

== Legacy ==
"Walk This Way" was one of two hit singles by the band to hit the Top 10 of the Billboard Hot 100 in the 1970s, the other one being a re-release of "Dream On". "Walk This Way" helped Toys in the Attic to be the bestselling Aerosmith album, and one of the most critically acclaimed. Aerosmith's version of "Walk This Way" often competes with "Sweet Emotion" and "Dream On" for the title of Aerosmith's signature song, being one of the band's most important, influential, and recognizable songs. The band rarely omits it from their concert setlist, still performing their classic version of the song to this day. The song has also long been a staple of rock radio, garnering regular airplay on mainstream rock, classic rock, and album-oriented rock radio stations. In 2009, it was named the eighth greatest hard rock song of all time by VH1.

Fee Waybill, Steve Lukather, Tim Bogert and Tommy Aldridge covered the song for the Aerosmith tribute album Not the Same Old Song and Dance (Eagle Records, 1999).

Aerosmith reference lyrics from the song in "Legendary Child". The line "I took a chance at the high school dance never knowing wrong from right" references lyrics from the songs "Walk This Way" and "Adam's Apple" respectively. Both songs first appeared on the album Toys in the Attic.

Alternative rock group They Might Be Giants composed a track with surreal lyrics intended to sync up to the music video for the Run-DMC/Aerosmith version called "Last Wave"; a reworked version was ultimately released on their 2018 album I Like Fun.

In 2019, the song was inducted into the Grammy Hall of Fame.

== Run-DMC/Aerosmith version ==
"Walk This Way"

Single by Run-DMC and Aerosmith

from the album Raising Hell
- B-side: "Walk This Way" (instrumental)
- Released: July 4, 1986
- Recorded: March 9, 1986
- Genre: Rap rock; hard rock
- Length: 5:17 (album version); 3:38 (single/video version)
- Label: Profile; Geffen
- Songwriters: Steven Tyler; Joe Perry
- Producers: Russell Simmons; Rick Rubin

Run-DMC singles chronology
"My Adidas" (1986)	"Walk This Way" (1986)	"You Be Illin'" (1986)

Aerosmith singles chronology
"My Fist Your Face" (1985)	"Walk This Way" (1986)	"Dude (Looks Like a Lady)" (1986)

Music video
- "Walk This Way" on YouTube

In 1986, the hip-hop group Run-DMC covered "Walk This Way", in collaboration with Aerosmith (with its leaders Steven Tyler and Joe Perry on vocals and guitars, respectively). While working on Raising Hell, Rick Rubin pulled out Toys in the Attic. At shows, Run-DMC had freestyled over the first few seconds of the song on a loop, not knowing what the full song sounded like, or even hearing the lyrics. While Joseph Simmons and Darryl McDaniels had no idea who Aerosmith were at that time, Rubin suggested remaking the song. Neither Simmons nor McDaniels liked the idea, and considered the lyrics "hillbilly gibberish", though Jam Master Jay was open to it. Rubin brought in Tyler and Perry to re-record their parts; initially, Run and DMC intended to mimic Tyler's delivery, but were convinced by Jam Master Jay to do it in a more natural rap flow. Perry also recorded the bass tracks for the song; the studio didn't have a bass at hand, so one of the Beastie Boys, who happened to hang around the studio, went home and brought in his bass for Perry to use.

Even after recording with Tyler and Perry, Run-DMC did not want the record to be released as a single, and were shocked when it was played on both urban and rock radio stations. "I never even thought 'Walk This Way' would be a single," Rubin recalled. "Not that I didn't like it, but I didn't think in those terms." DMC called it "a beautiful thing" in a trailer for Guitar Hero: Aerosmith. This version of "Walk This Way" charted higher on the Billboard Hot 100 than the original, peaking at number 4, becoming Run-DMC's biggest hit. It was also the first hip-hop single to reach the top five on the Billboard charts, as well as one of the first big hip-hop singles in the UK, peaking at number 8.

Cash Box called it "a raucous, sure-to-please version of the Aerosmith classic."

The song marked a major comeback for Aerosmith, as they had been largely out of mainstream pop culture for several years while Tyler battled substance use disorder and Perry and Brad Whitford were out of the band. Their 1985 comeback album, Done with Mirrors, had also not met commercial expectations. Aerosmith followed "Walk This Way" with multi-platinum albums and Top 40 hits, starting with Permanent Vacation and its hit "Dude (Looks Like a Lady)" in 1987.

In 2008, "Walk This Way" was ranked number 4 on VH1's "100 Greatest Songs of Hip Hop".

The chorus of Run-DMC's cover contains a pitch alternation that Aerosmith adopted in most future live performances. In collaborations, the other singer often says "talk this way" every alternate line of the chorus. This rap-style delivery may explain why the song worked so well as a hip-hop song when it was covered eleven years later.

=== Music video ===
The 1986 video for "Walk This Way" symbolically places a rock band and Run-DMC in a musical duel in neighbouring studios before Steven Tyler literally breaks through the wall that separates them. The video segues to the bands' joint performance on stage. Guitarist Perry recalls the experience and the impact on the network: "It was fun going down there and recording with them, and when they said, 'It's gonna go on the record. Do you want to do this video of you guys playing, and then you break down a wall, and we're side by side?' We said, 'Yeah, let's do it,' that was pretty amazing. It was amazing because it really did break down walls. At the time, I don't think that there were any minority acts on MTV, except for Michael Jackson, up to that point. If there was (sic), it wasn't a lot, and I think it definitely opened some doors, and I'm really proud of that. I'd like to say we planned it and that we knew that it was going to happen, but we didn't. I'm just glad it was Aerosmith and Run-DMC that did it."

The video was directed by Jon Small and filmed at the Park Theater in Union City, New Jersey. Small had an office at 1775 Broadway, the same building where Run-DMC's label Profile Records were based: Profile's co-owner Steve Plotnicki approached Small about directing the video, as he had directed another video by a black act that had broken through into rotation onto the then predominantly white, album-rock-oriented MTV, Whitney Houston's "The Greatest Love of All". Small believed that for the video to break into heavy play on MTV, it had to feature Tyler and Perry: he developed the concept of the bands playing on either side of a wall that was subsequently breached. The video's budget was a modest $67,000.

Aside from Tyler and Perry, none of the other rock musicians in the video are the Aerosmith members; instead, they were played by Roger Lane, J. D. Malo, and Matt Stelutto—respectively rhythm guitarist, bassist, and drummer of the largely unknown hair metal outfit Smashed Gladys. According to VH1's Pop Up Video, Run-DMC could not afford to use the entire Aerosmith band, just Tyler and Perry. As only Tyler and Perry had traveled to record the cover, they were the only Aerosmith members to appear, even though the entire band was credited in some releases of the remake.

According to journalist Geoff Edgers, Tyler and Perry were initially ambivalent about appearing in the video: when Small phoned Tyler to discuss the video concept, Tyler told him: "Just don't make fools of us... I don't want people laughing at us". Plotnicki described the atmosphere on set as "beyond chilly", whilst Smashed Gladys lead guitarist Bart Lewis was struck by the fact that interaction between the members of Aerosmith and Run-DMC was minimal. However, according to Edgers, the frosty relations did thaw as the shoot went on.

=== Credits and personnel ===
- Rev. Run, Darryl McDaniels – rap
- Steven Tyler – featured vocals
- Joe Perry – featured lead guitarist, bass guitar, backing vocals
- Jam Master Jay, Rev. Run – co-producer
- Howie Weinberg – mastering engineer

=== Charts and certifications ===
==== Weekly charts ====
Weekly chart performance for Run D.M.C. version
Chart (1986)	Peak position
Australia (Kent Music Report)	9
Austria (Ö3 Austria Top 40)	26
Belgium (Ultratop 50 Flanders)	6
Canada (The Record)	4
Canadian RPM Top Singles	6
Europe (European Hot 100 Singles)	7
Finland (Suomen virallinen lista)	14
France (SNEP)	61
Ireland (IRMA)	12
Italy (Musica e dischi)	16
Netherlands (Dutch Top 40)	2
Netherlands (Single Top 100)	2
New Zealand (Recorded Music NZ)	1
Norway (VG-lista)	6
Switzerland (Schweizer Hitparade)	9
UK Singles (Official Charts)	8
US Billboard Hot 100	4
US Hot Dance Club Play (Billboard)	6
US Hot Dance Music/Maxi-Singles Sales (Billboard)	13
US Hot Black (now R&B/Hip-Hop) Singles (Billboard)	8
West Germany (GfK)	13

==== Year-end charts ====
1986 year-end chart performance for Run D.M.C. version
Chart (1986)	Rank
Australia (Kent Music Report)	82
Belgium (Ultratop)	78
Canada Top Singles (RPM)	54
Europe (European Hot 100 Singles)	92
Netherlands (Dutch Top 40)	36
Netherlands (Single Top 100)	9
New Zealand (Recorded Music NZ)	27
UK Singles (OCC)	70
US Billboard Hot 100	89
US Top 100 Singles (Cash Box)	80

==== Certifications ====
Certifications for Run D.M.C. version
Region	Certification	Certified units/sales
Canada (Music Canada)	Gold	50,000^{^}
Italy (FIMI)	Platinum	70,000^{‡}
New Zealand (RMNZ)	Platinum	30,000^{‡}
Spain (Promusicae)	Gold	30,000^{‡}
United Kingdom (BPI)	Platinum	600,000^{‡}
United States (RIAA)	Platinum	1,000,000^{‡}
^{^} Shipments figures based on certification alone.^{‡} Sales+streaming figures based on certification alone.

== Later collaborations ==
At the Super Bowl XXXV halftime show in January 2001, performers *NSYNC, Britney Spears, Mary J. Blige, and Nelly joined Aerosmith onstage for an encore performance of "Walk This Way" with Spears and members of *NSYNC singing different parts of the second verse, Blige adding background harmony, and Nelly performing a rap towards the end of the song.

DMC and Steve Tyler closed-out the July 2005 "Celebration of the Seas" event on Key Largo with a stage performance of "Walk This Way".

Aerosmith and Run-DMC performed "Walk This Way" at the 62nd Annual Grammy Awards in 2020.

== Awards and accolades ==
=== Song ===
- The song won both groups a Soul Train Music Award for Best Rap - Single in 1987.
- The song "Walk This Way" is part of The Rock and Roll Hall of Fame's 500 Songs that Shaped Rock and Roll list.
- Rolling Stone ranked the original version of "Walk This Way" at number 346 on their list of the 500 Greatest Songs of All Time, and the version by Run-D.M.C. was ranked at number 293 in 2010.
- In 2000, "VH1: 100 Greatest Rock Songs" included "Walk This Way" at number 35.
- In March 2005, Q magazine placed it at number 23 in its list of the 100 Greatest Guitar Tracks.
- In 2008, Rolling Stone ranked the original version of "Walk This Way" at number 34 on their list of the 100 Greatest Guitar Songs of All Time.
- In 2009, VH1's "100 Greatest Hard Rock Songs" included "Walk This Way" at number 8.
- VH1 ranked the version by Run-D.M.C. at number 4 on VH1 100 Greatest Hip Hop Songs.

=== Music video ===
- In 1993, "Rolling Stone: The Top 100 Music Videos" included "Walk This Way" (with Run-D.M.C.) at number 11.
- In 1999, "MTV: 100 Greatest Videos Ever Made" included "Walk This Way" (with Run-D.M.C.) at number 5.
- In 2001, "VH1: 100 Greatest Videos" included "Walk This Way" (with Run-D.M.C.) at number 11.
- In 2007, "Fuse: 25 Greatest Music Videos" included "Walk This Way" (with Run-D.M.C.) at number 24.

=== Track listing ===
- CD Single
1. Walk This Way – 4:46
2. Little Hands – 8:16
3. Rhythm of the Road – 6:08
4. San Jose – 8:53

== Sugababes vs. Girls Aloud version ==
"Walk This Way"

Single by Sugababes vs. Girls Aloud
- Released: March 12, 2007
- Recorded: December 2006
- Genre: Dance-rock
- Length: 2:53
- Label: Fascination; Island
- Songwriters: Steven Tyler; Joe Perry
- Producer: Dallas Austin

Sugababes singles chronology
"Easy" (2006)	"Walk This Way" (2007)	"About You Now" (2007)

Girls Aloud singles chronology
"I Think We're Alone Now" (2006)	"Walk This Way" (2007)	"Sexy! No No No..." (2007)

Music video
- "Walk This Way" on YouTube

In 2007, both British girl groups Girls Aloud and Sugababes recorded their mash-up cover of "Walk This Way" as the official Comic Relief charity single. Their version was produced by American producer Dallas Austin, making it Girls Aloud's first single not to be produced by Xenomania. The track charted at number one on the UK Singles Chart, giving Girls Aloud their third number 1 and Sugababes their fifth.

The music video was a comic re-enactment of the Run-D.M.C. video. "Walk This Way" was promoted through numerous live appearances and has been included on tours by both Girls Aloud and Sugababes. Contemporary music critics criticised the cover version, but supported the single due to its fundraising nature.

=== Background and release ===
The idea of a Girls Aloud and Sugababes collaboration came from Comic Relief co-founder and trustee Richard Curtis. Several songs were possibilities, including Blur's "Girls & Boys" and Candi Staton's "You Got the Love", which was Girls Aloud member Nicola Roberts' idea and favourite choice. "Walk This Way" is notably the first Girls Aloud single to date not to feature production from Brian Higgins and Xenomania, who have also worked with Sugababes. Girls Aloud and Sugababes launched the charity appeal on January 31. Kimberley Walsh of Girls Aloud said, "It's a fantastic song and hopefully will raise tons of money for people living in really difficult situations here and in Africa."

Cheryl and Amelle perform the refrain, Kimberley and Nadine sang the first verse, Keisha and Heidi sang the second verse, and Sarah, Nicola, and Amelle rap in the middle eight.

The single was released on March 12, 2007, on just one CD single format, which included a remix of the single and its music video. It was also available as a digital download.

=== Chart performance ===
"Walk This Way" entered the UK Singles Chart at number 1 on March 18, 2007 ― for the week ending date March 24, 2007. The following week, the single dropped to number 2; it was dethroned by another Comic Relief single, "I'm Gonna Roll (500 Miles)" by The Proclaimers with Peter Kay and Matt Lucas. In its third week on the chart, "Walk This Way" dropped twelve places out of the top ten, placing itself at number 14.

The song also charted at number 8 on the Billboard European Hot 100 Singles chart.

=== Music video ===
The music video premiered on The Box on February 2, 2007, and was shown on Channel 4's Popworld the following day. The video was filmed over three days in January 2007 – Sugababes on the first, Cheryl Cole, Nicola Roberts, and Kimberley Walsh on the second, and Nadine Coyle and Sarah Harding on the third and final day. The video includes cameos from Davina McCall, Lily Cole, Stephen Mangan, Graham Norton, Ruby Wax and Natalie Cassidy.

=== Track listing and formats ===
These are the formats and track listings of major single releases of "Walk This Way".

UK CD single (Polydor/Island / 1724331)

1. "Walk This Way" – 2:52
2. "Walk This Way" [Yoad Mix] – 3:01
3. "Walk This Way" [video] – 3:07
4. Behind the Scenes Footage [video] – 3:15

UK digital copy & International Digital EP (Polydor/Island / 1724332)

1. "Walk This Way" – 2:52
2. "Walk This Way" [Yoad Mix] – 3:01

=== Credits and personnel ===
- Engineer: Rick Shepherd, Graham Archer (assistant recording)
- Keyboards: Brian Higgins, Tim Powell
- Mixing: Jeremy Wheatley, Richard Edgeler (assistant)
- Production: Dallas Austin
- Vocals: Girls Aloud, Sugababes

=== Charts ===
==== Weekly charts ====
Chart (2007–2008)	Peak position
El Salvador (EFE)	10
Europe (European Hot 100 Singles)	8
Ireland (IRMA)	14
Scottish Singles Sales (Official Charts)	1
UK Singles (Official Charts)	1

==== Year-end charts ====
Chart (2007)	Position
UK Singles (OCC)	72
