= Darryl McDaniels =

American rapper (born 1964)

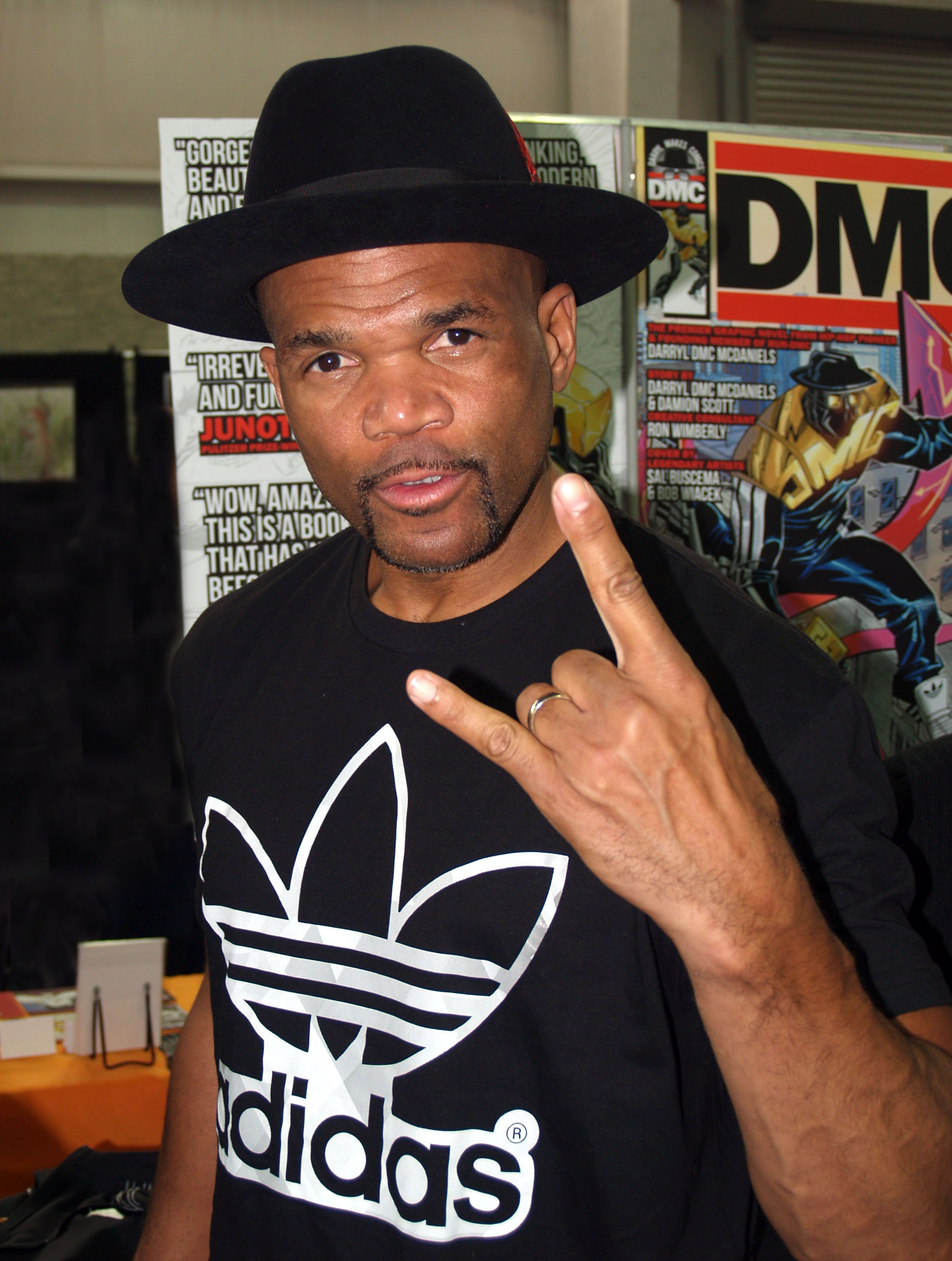
- McDaniels at the 2014 New York Comic Con

Background information
- Also known as: D.M.C.; Easy D
- Born: Darryl Matthews McDaniels; May 31, 1964 (age 62); New York City, U.S.
- Genres: Hip-hop; East Coast hip-hop; rap rock; golden age hip-hop
- Occupations: Rapper; record producer
- Years active: 1983–present
- Formerly of: Run-DMC

Darryl Matthews McDaniels (born May 31, 1964), also commonly known by his stage name DMC (or D.M.C.), is an American rapper and record producer. He is a founding member of the hip-hop group Run-DMC, and is considered one of the pioneers of hip-hop culture.

== Early life ==
McDaniels grew up in the New York City neighborhood of Hollis, Queens. He was born to an unwed mother who surrendered him to the New York Foundling home. He was a ward of the Foundling, in foster care, until placed with the McDaniels when he was one month old and eventually adopted by them. They raised him as a Catholic, and he attended St. Pascal Baylon Elementary School. He later attended Rice High School in Harlem, Manhattan, New York City. He subsequently attended St. John's University in Queens, New York City.

McDaniels listened to rock music and folk music in his youth; he first became interested in hip hop music in the 1970s after listening to recordings of Grandmaster Flash and the Furious Five. In 1978, McDaniels taught himself to DJ in the basement of his parents' home, using turntables and a mixer that he bought with his older brother, Alford, after having a comic book sale in their neighborhood. During this period he adopted the stage name Grandmaster Get High.

== Career ==
Later that year in 1978, McDaniels sold his DJ equipment, after his friend Joseph "Run" Simmons acquired his own turntables and mixer. After Jam Master Jay – who had a reputation as the best young DJ in Hollis – joined the group, Run encouraged McDaniels to rap rather than DJ. Gradually, McDaniels came to prefer rapping to mixing records, and adopted the nickname of "Easy D". In 1981, he dropped the "Easy D" moniker in favor of "DMcD", the way he signed his work in school, and then to the shorter "D.M.C." This new nickname alternately stood for "Devastating Mic Control" or "Darryl Mac", his nickname since childhood as referenced in the lyrics of the song "King of Rock".

In 1984, the trio released their self-titled debut album. Their third album Raising Hell, went to No. 6 on the Billboard 200 and No. 1 on the Top R&B/Hip-Hop Albums chart, making Run-D.M.C. the most popular hip-hop group at the time. During this time, McDaniels became a heavy drinker. He was known to drink up to eight 40-ounce bottles of malt liquor a day and was arrested twice for public intoxication and driving while intoxicated. In 1987 Run-D.M.C. wrote "Christmas in Hollis" for A Very Special Christmas. The music video for "Christmas in Hollis" was shot in Hollis, Queens. Run-D.M.C. filmed the video during their 1987 tour. DMC's mother made a guest appearance in the video.

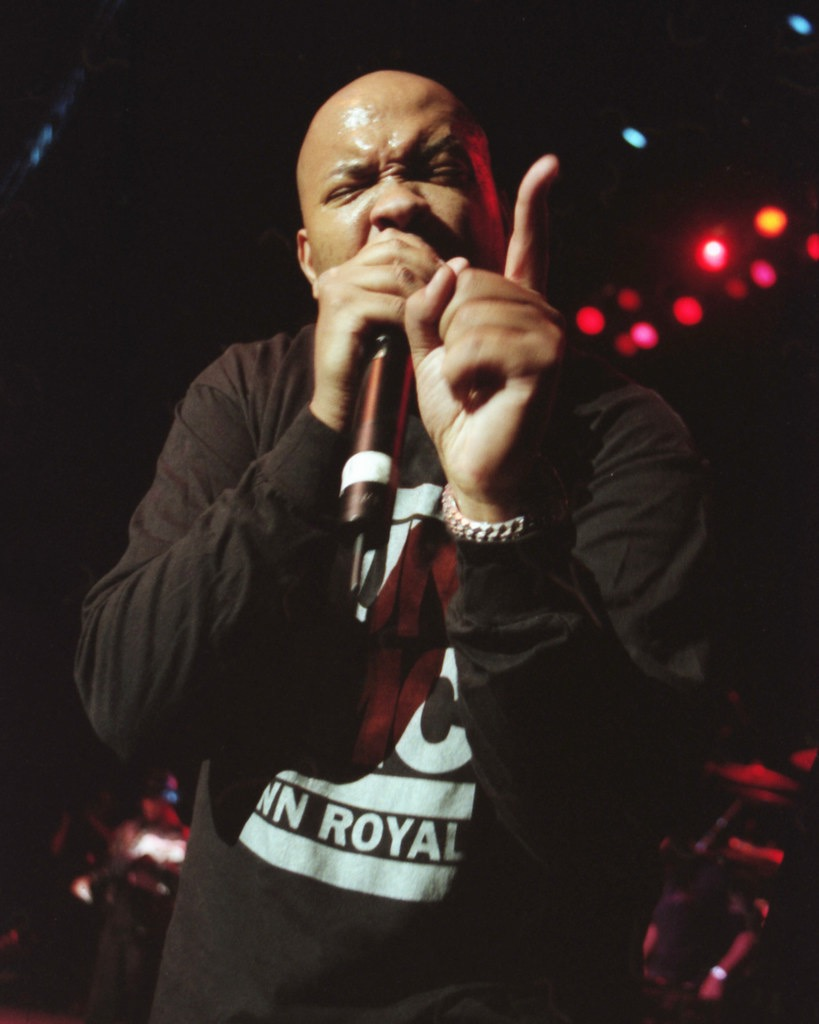
Darryl McDaniels performs with Run-DMC at Deck the Hall Ball in 1999 in Seattle.

In 1997, McDaniels began to develop a deep depression. He became extremely unhappy with the routine of touring and performing, and with being away from his wife and newborn son. He began to rely heavily on prescription drugs and alcohol to ease the pain. While on tour, McDaniels noticed his voice was giving out. He was later diagnosed with spasmodic dysphonia, a vocal disorder which causes involuntary spasms of the larynx muscles. He believes it was caused by the aggressive way in which he performs his lyrics compounded with the years of heavy drinking.

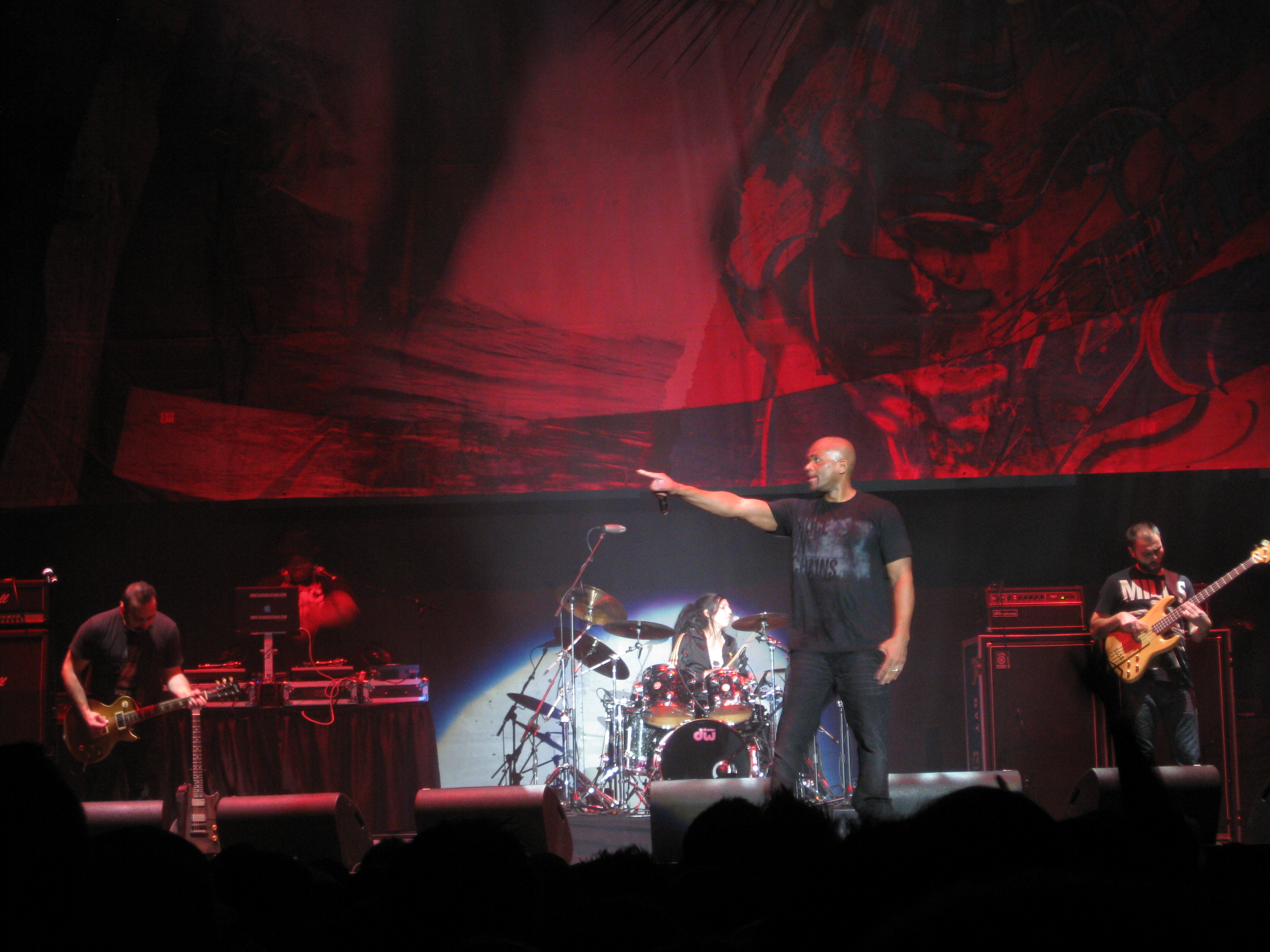
McDaniels performing with his backing band in 2011

Meanwhile, McDaniels began to have creative differences with his bandmates in Run-D.M.C., which by then, was past its prime as a commercially successful hip-hop group. A longtime fan of artists such as The Beatles, Bob Dylan, and Harry Chapin, McDaniels wanted to move towards a slower, softer sound which suited his now troubled voice. Run wanted to continue with the aggressive, hard rock–edged, sound that the group was known for. These disagreements caused McDaniels to sit out most of the recording of Crown Royal (2001). He appeared on only three songs.

Feeling depressed and suicidal, McDaniels heard Sarah McLachlan's song "Angel" (1997) on the radio. The song touched McDaniels so deeply that it inspired him to reassess his life and career. He credits McLachlan and her album Surfacing (on which "Angel" appeared) with saving his life. With a new outlook on life, McDaniels decided to write his autobiography. While researching his early years, his mother, Bannah, revealed a secret: Darryl had been placed for adoption when he was three months old. According to Bannah, his birth mother was a woman of Dominican descent named Bernada Lovelace. He also learned that he was born in Harlem, Manhattan, not Hollis, Queens, as he had always believed. The news inspired him to search for his birth mother. He began working with the VH1 network on a documentary chronicling his quest. His autobiography, King of Rock: Respect, Responsibility, and My Life with Run-DMC, was released in January 2001.

In February 2006, VH1 premiered the documentary, DMC: My Adoption Journey. The program ends with McDaniels reuniting with his birth mother, who turned out to be named Berncenia and despite previous beliefs, was not, in fact, of Dominican descent. He thanked her for her choice because, had he not been placed for adoption, Run-D.M.C. would have never existed. In March 2006, McDaniels released his solo album, Checks Thugs and Rock N Roll. Produced and Music Directed by Romeo Antonio. The first single, "Just Like Me", features an interpolation of Harry Chapin's "Cat's in the Cradle" (1974) performed by McDaniels' musical savior, Sarah McLachlan. During a recording session, McLachlan revealed to McDaniels that she, too, had been adopted.

McDaniels testified before the New Jersey State Legislature in support of legislation to restore adopted adults' access to their original birth certificates. The legislation McDaniels supported was signed by Governor Chris Christie and became effective on January 1, 2017. As a New York–born adoptee, however, McDaniels did not have access to his own original birth record; he hired a private investigator to help find his birth family in New York.

McDaniels is featured in the video game Guitar Hero: Aerosmith (2008) singing Run-D.M.C.'s singles "King of Rock" and "Walk This Way". He is also an unlockable guitarist in the game.

In 2009, McDaniels performed in The People Speak, a documentary feature film that uses dramatic and musical performances of the letters, diaries, and speeches of everyday Americans, based on historian Howard Zinn's nonfiction book A People's History of the United States (1980).

McDaniels' second solo album, the more rock oriented The Origins Of Block Music, was due out in mid-2010 but was delayed. In December 2010, McDaniels appeared with Talib Kweli, Mix Master Mike, and Ahmet Zappa on a cover of Frank Zappa's "Willie the Pimp" for The Frank Zappa AAAFNRAAAA Birthday Bundle 2010.

In 2011, McDaniels joined forces with producer Wade Martin to open the record label IME Records.

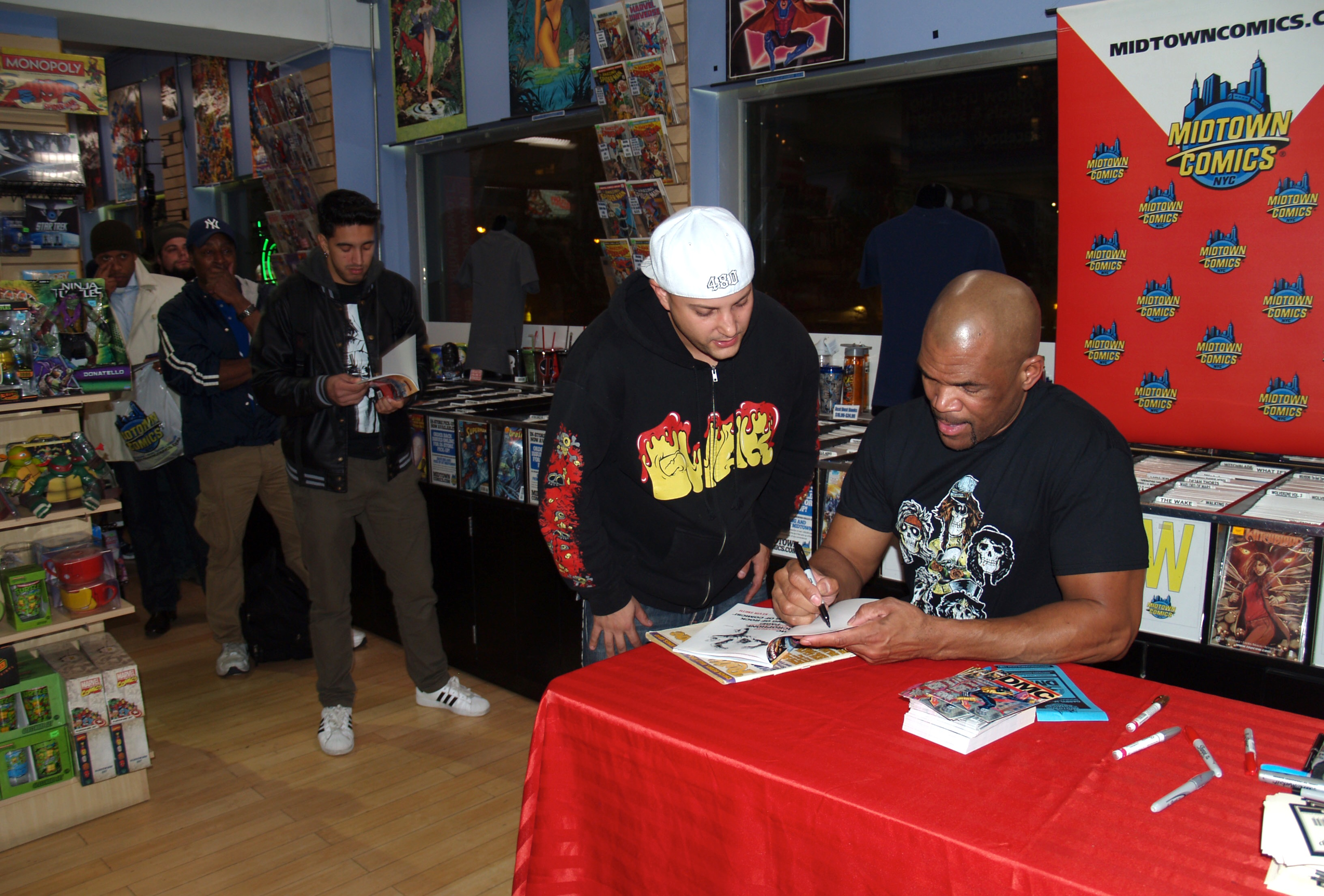
McDaniels signs copies of his comic book, DMC #1, at a November 6, 2014 appearance at Midtown Comics in Manhattan.

In 2014, McDaniels ventured into the comics industry with his own publishing imprint, Darryl Makes Comics. McDaniels explains his lifelong love of the medium thus:

Growing up a mild-mannered, Catholic school kid, all I did was go to school and read comic books. I was strictly a Marvel Comics head; Avengers, Iron Man, Captain America, The Hulk, Iron Fist, you name it. I loved Marvel because it was the city; it was all New York. The same backdrop I was living in in this universe was in the Marvel Universe. Comics did for me what hip hop did for me as I got older; it empowered me, inspired me and educated me. I learned about Nazis, space exploration, everything from comics.

Darryl Makes Comics' first book is DMC, a 90-page anthology graphic novel set in 1985 that features McDaniels as a superhero who confronts both criminals and other superheroes whose recklessness threatens innocent lives. The comic's version of DMC wears McDaniels' signature Adidas sneakers, fedora and rope chain, along with an elongated turtleneck that masks his face. The book is written by McDaniels and Damion Scott, and edited by Darryl Makes Comics' Editor-in-Chief, Edgardo Miranda-Rodriguez and Senior Editor Rigo "Riggs" Morales. Each chapter in the anthology is illustrated by a different artist, because, as McDaniels explained, "If DMC was really running around and bumped into four different people, they'd have four different descriptions of what he was like. We wanted each artist's work to relate to each character's view of DMC. If you saw him, you might say, "He came out of a spaceship and had all these things flying around him!" But then another dude is like, "No! He had a sword and shield!" We thought, if so many people saw something different in DMC, we'd have to have different artwork to represent their opinions on him or their interpretation on him." In addition, graffiti writers such as MARE 139 were hired to give the shots of 1985 New York City graffiti a sense of authenticity. The book features an introduction by Greg Pak, a cover by Sal Buscema and Bob Wiacek and interior pinups by Carlos Pacheco, Chris Burnham, ChrisCross, Dexter Vines, and Shelby Robertson, some of which are homages to iconic comics covers that influenced the creative staff as children. DMC debuted at the New York Comic Con October 9–12, and was subsequently released in comics shops October 29. The book received a four out of five stars rating by Tony Guerrero of Comic Vine, who lauded the charm and authenticity of the art.

As of January 2015, McDaniels was working with the band Generation Kill on a project, DMC Generation Kill, to be produced by former Guns N' Roses guitarist Ron "Bumblefoot" Thal.

On the December 17, 2016 Christmas episode of Saturday Night Live, DMC made a cameo appearance during a parody of Run DMC's "Christmas in Hollis." During the sketch, he was portrayed by musical guest Chance the Rapper.

On February 17, 2016, heavy metal band Solus Deus released their EP titled The Plague. The song titled "Anacrime" features DMC on guest vocals.

Starting in 2017 and continuing on an ongoing basis, DMC has joined the rock cover supergroup Royal Machines as a guest at their occasional concerts. Joining a revolving cast of celebrities in each lineup, including Dave Navarro, Billy Morrison, Sebastian Bach, Macy Gray, Fred Durst, DMC has performed covers of songs such as "Walk This Way", "Sweet Emotion", and "Black Betty" with the band.

On September 15, 2017, Italian rapper Caparezza released his studio album, Prisoner 709, which includes the track "Forever Jung" that features DMC on guest vocals. American rapper DeLiverance's 2018 single "Slave To The Rhythm" also features DMC on guest vocals.

On August 13, 2018, DMC performed an encore with O.A.R., playing "Walk This Way".

In February 2021, McDaniels released a song and animated video, "Let's All Get the Vaccine," to encourage the COVID-19 vaccination.

In January 2022, McDaniels released his picture book, Darryl's Dream, published by Random House.

In January 2024, McDaniels released a cookie brand DMC Cookies. In June 2024, a music video for Fantastic Cat's "So Glad You Made It" features McDaniels acting in the role of a music producer.

In 2023, McDaniels recorded guest vocals on the album My Veneration by the band Patriarchs in Black.

In July 2024 McDaniels wrote and recorded two songs with Patriartchs in Black guitarist Dan Lorenzo, "terRIFFic!" and "Game Changer".

On October 3, 2026, McDaniels will appear at the Power to the People Festival at Merriweather Post Pavilion in Columbia, MD. The festival, which is being put on by Tom Morello, will also feature performances by Morello, Bruce Springsteen, Foo Fighters and many others. The festival is being held in response to President Donald Trump.

== Charity work ==
The Felix Organization

In 2006, McDaniels and Sheila Jaffe, a fellow adoptee and Emmy award-winning casting director, co-founded The Felix Organization.

Since its inception, The Felix Organization has served more than 10,000 children in the foster care system. Its flagship program, Camp Felix, is an annual sleepaway summer camp in Putnam Valley, New York. Additionally, The Felix Organization sponsors two teen camps on the East Coast. Camp Felix West is for Los Angeles-based youth in foster care.

Other charity work

In September 2006, McDaniels received the Congressional Angels in Adoption award for his work with children in foster care and promotion of adoption. He is a former board member of Children's Rights, a national watchdog organization that reforms failing child welfare systems.

== Personal life ==
McDaniels has been a resident of Wayne, New Jersey.

McDaniels has openly discussed his history of alcoholism and drug abuse. He has been very frank about his battles with depression, including an appearance on Live From the Barrage, speaking at length about it. He also has written pieces in Men's Health and BlackDoctor, where he talked about his memoir, Ten Ways Not to Commit Suicide (Amistad, 2017).

== Discography ==
With Run-D.M.C.

- Run-D.M.C. (1984)
- King of Rock (1985)
- Raising Hell (1986)
- Tougher Than Leather (1988)
- Back from Hell (1990)
- Down with the King (1993)
- Crown Royal (2001)

Solo

- Checks Thugs and Rock n Roll (2006)
- Back from the Dead EP (2017)

With Fragile Mortals

- The Dark Project (2016)

== Filmography ==
=== Film ===
Year	Title	Role	Notes
1985	Krush Groove (film)	Darryl "D.M.C." McDaniels	
1988	Tougher Than Leather	Darryl "D.M.C." McDaniels	
1993	Who's the Man?	Detective (as D.M.C.)	
2003	Death of a Dynasty	Old School Rapper #2 (as D.M.C.)	
2005	Roll Bounce	Garden D.J. Smooth Dee	
2023	Good Burger 2	Himself	

=== TV ===
Year	Title	Role	Notes
1986	Reading Rainbow	Himself	Season 4, Episode 10
1989	WWF Challenge	D.M.C.	Season 4, Episode #4.14
1992	The Ben Stiller Show	D.M.C.	Season 1, Episode 3
2006	D.M.C.: My Adoption Journey	Himself	
2015	Comic Book Men	Himself	Season 4, Episode 13
2011	FCU: Fact Checkers Unit	D.M.C.	Season 2, Episode 4
2016	Hip-Hop Evolution	Himself	Documentary-Series
2018	The Big Narstie Show	Guest	Season 1, Episode 2
2022	WeCrashed	Himself	Season 1 Episode 4
2022	That Girl Lay Lay	Guest	Season 2, Episode 8

== Video game appearances ==
Year	Title	Role	Notes
2005	The Warriors (video game)	Scopes (voice)	
2008	Guitar Hero: Aerosmith	Himself	
