= Joseph Simmons =

American rapper (born 1964)

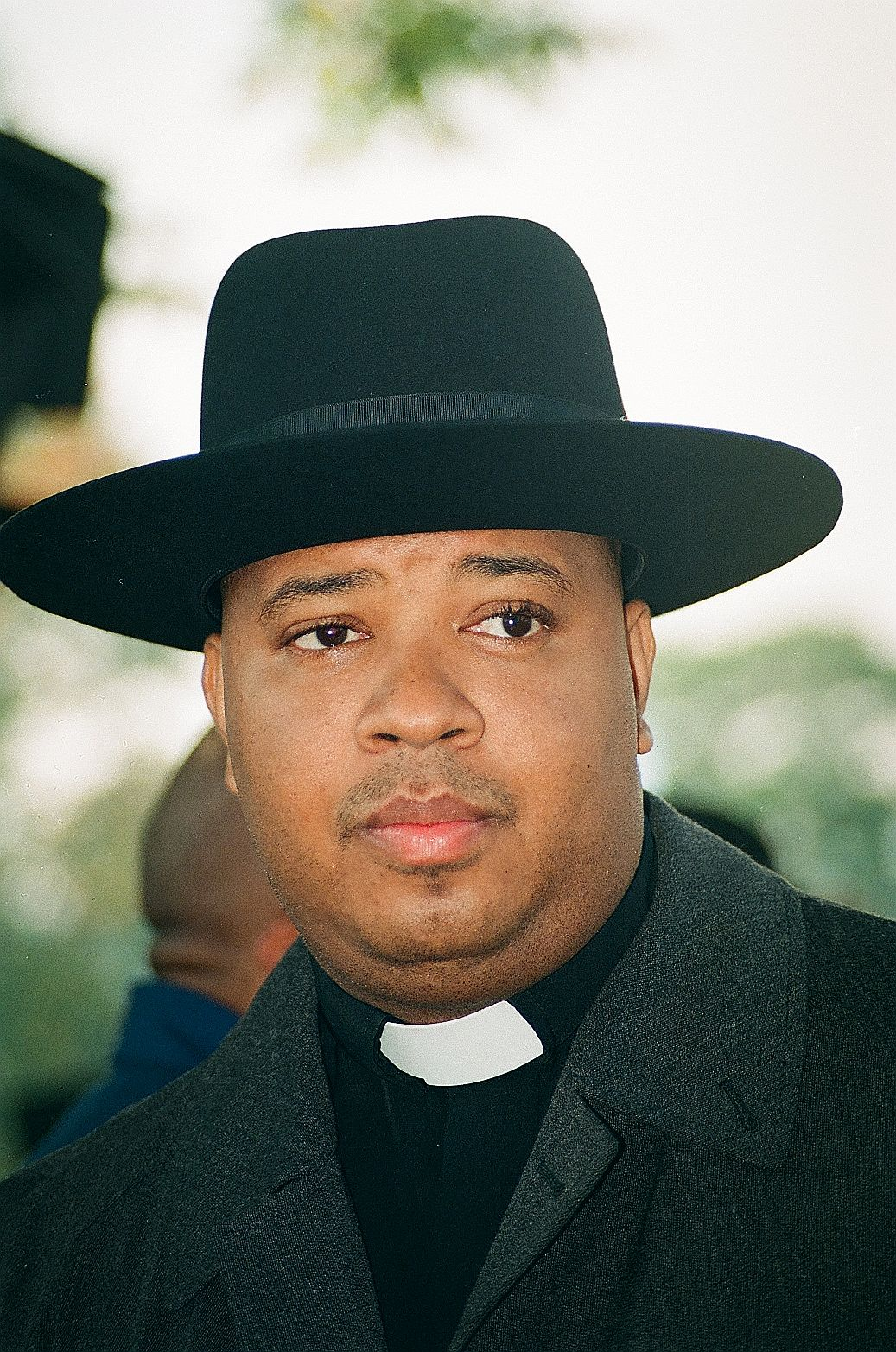
- Simmons in 2000

Background information
- Also known as: Run; Rev. Run; DJ Run
- Born: Joseph Ward Simmons; November 14, 1964 (age 62); Queens, New York City, U.S.
- Genres: Hip hop; East Coast hip-hop; rap rock; new-school hip-hop; golden age hip-hop
- Occupations: Rapper; songwriter; record producer; disc jockey; television personality; reverend
- Formerly of: Run-DMC

Joseph Ward Simmons (born November 14, 1964), better known by the stage name Run, Rev. Run or DJ Run, is an American rapper, producer, DJ, and television personality. Simmons is one of the founding members of the influential hip hop group Run-DMC. He is also a practicing minister, known as Reverend Run.

He found new popularity in 2005 with his family's MTV reality show Run's House.

== Early life ==
Simmons was born November 14, 1964, in Hollis, Queens, New York. He is the younger brother of artist Danny Simmons and Russell Simmons, the co-founder of Def Jam records.

== Career ==
Before Run-D.M.C., Simmons was the lead vocalist in the hip-hop group named "The Force". He founded Run-D.M.C. as a lead vocalist along with friend Darryl "D.M.C." McDaniels and the late DJ Jason "Jam-Master Jay" Mizell.

Run began using the stage name of "Rev. Run" after he was ordained as a Pentecostal minister by E. Bernard Jordan, Simmons's spiritual mentor. Jordan also named him "Protege of the Year Award" in 2004. The same day, symbolic of his "Prosperity Ministry", there was a "Rolls-Royce parade outside the Plaza Hotel in New York City, "featuring Jordan's Phantom Rolls-Royce. The new $325,000 Phantom had been a gift from Reverend Run as a "thank you" for Jordan's mentoring support.

His first work as Rev. Run was a feature in the single "Song 4 Lovers" by UK pop band Liberty X in September 2005. The music video for that song was directed by Bill Schacht for Aestheticom and reached broadcast airplay chart positions of No. 2 Box UK and No. 4 MTV UK with heavy rotation on 5 other music channels in the UK. "Song 4 Lovers" also reached No. 5 on the Official Charts Company's UK Top 40 Singles Chart, becoming the band's seventh top ten hit.

It was followed by his first solo album, Distortion. The first single from the album, "Mind on the Road", is featured in the EA Sports's Madden NFL 06 video game. "Mind on the Road" uses samples from the song "I Love Rock 'n' Roll", in the tradition of Run–D.M.C.'s 1980s hits which use samples like Aerosmith's hit "Walk This Way".

In 2002, he appeared on a special "Rap Stars" edition of The Weakest Link, and was the third one voted off.

Rev Run appeared on the MTV series Run's House, a reality show revolving around his everyday life with his family, from 2005 to 2009.

In 2007, he appeared with his son Diggy Simmons on My Super Sweet 16 while attending a 16th birthday party for Diddy's son, Quincy. Diddy is also the producer of Run's House.

In 2008, Simmons and his wife Justine teamed up with Kool-Aid and a non-profit organization called KaBOOM!

On August 5, 2008, Gotham Press published Simmons' book, Take Back Your Family: A Challenge to America's Parents, co-authored by his wife, Justine Simmons, and Chris Morrow.

On September 8, 2007, Rev Run was honored as a BMI Icon at the annual BMI Urban Awards.

The weekend of September 17 and 18 of 2011, Rev Run made a special guest appearance at Bay Area Fellowship with Pastor Bil Cornelius in Corpus Christi, Texas Bay Area Fellowship Church.

In October 2011, Rev Run was a special guest of Fellowship Church based out of Grapevine, Texas.

Simmons has also created three other cable series, two premiered in 2014; Rev Run's Renovation which runs on both the DIY Network and HGTV, and Rev Run's Sunday Suppers for Cooking Channel, the other Rev Runs Around the World premiered on the Travel Channel in 2016.

== Personal life ==
Simmons married Valerie Vaughn in 1983. They have three children: Vanessa Simmons, Angela Simmons, and Joseph "JoJo" Ward Simmons, Jr.

He married Justine Jones on June 25, 1994. With her, he had three more children: Daniel "Diggy" Simmons III, Russell "Russy" Simmons II, and Victoria Anne Simmons. Victoria was four pounds, five ounces when she was delivered via caesarean section. She died shortly after being born on September 26, 2006, due to omphalocele, a birth defect that caused her organs to grow outside her body. The Simmons' allowed MTV camera crews of Run's House to document baby Victoria's death, telling People that "God, in my mind, gave us something to go through in front of America, so we documented it on-camera – not so much to show you sadness, but to show you how we, as ministers, would handle this tragedy. [The kids] found out on-camera. Diggy was waiting to see, 'How's Mommy?' And the first words we said were, 'The baby didn't make it.'" Soon they adopted a baby girl, Miley Justine Simmons.

The Simmons family lives in Saddle River, New Jersey in a six-bedroom colonial-style home that was listed for sale in 2007 for $5.5 million.

In 2017, Simmons said he was adopting vegetarianism because God advised him to.

== Discography ==
=== Solo ===
Distortion

- Released: October 18, 2005
- Format: LP
- Label: Def Jam
- Producer: Whiteboys Noise (Dub B & Jumpers)
- Sales: 86,000 (U.S)
- Singles: "Mind on the Road"
