= Sonny Seeza discography =

American rapper

- Studio albums: 2
- Soundtrack albums: 11
- Compilation albums: 1
- Singles: 4
- Music videos: 2

The discography of American hardcore rapper Sonny Seeza, best known as a member of multi-platinum hardcore rap group Onyx, consists of two solo studio albums, one compilation album, eleven soundtrack albums, one international project, four singles, and two music videos.

In 1982, Tyrone Taylor began in Brooklyn as a member of his older brother's hip-hop group, Cold Crash Scenes, performing with Killah Priest. Suave was discovered by Jam Master Jay of Run-D.M.C., who signed Onyx on his label JMJ Records. Onyx went on to release three top-selling albums and two commercially unsuccessful, before Sonny Seeza began his solo career. As a part of Onyx, Sonny Seeza released 5 albums and 20 singles, was nominated as "Rap/Hip-Hop New Artist" on American Music Awards and won "Best Rap Album" on Soul Train Music Awards, and sold over 15 million studio albums worldwide.

== Albums ==
=== Studio albums ===
List of albums, with selected chart positions, sales figures and certifications
Title	Album details
Tytanium	Released: May 19, 2009; Label: Iceman Music Group; Formats: CD, MD, LP
Bridges	Released: February 26, 2016; Label: Empire Music; Formats: MD

=== Mixtapes ===
Sonny Seeza's mixtapes and details
Title	Mixtape details
The Billboard Blackmarket Mixtape	Released: July, 2012; Label: Empire Music

=== Soundtrack albums ===
- August 21, 1993: Strapped
- September 14, 1993: Judgment Night
- April 23, 1996: Sunset Park
- April 6, 1995: The Addiction
- August 15, 1995: The Show
- February 17, 1998: Ride (Music From The Dimension Motion Picture)
- December 21, 2001: How High
- October 29, 2002: 8 Mile
- October 24, 2005: Grand Theft Auto: Liberty City Stories
- December 17, 2016: Why Him?
- February 16, 2017: Fist Fight

=== International projects ===
- 2015: "Doc Help" (Remix Contest) (July, 2015)

== Singles ==
- 1998: *"Fire" / "Where You At" (as Sonsee from Onyx)
- 2012: "Doc Help"
- 2014: "We Can Due It"
- 2016: "Everywhere"

=== Single tracks ===
- 1998: Sonny Seeza - Poverty (Sonsee & G.O.Crew)
- 2008: Sonny Seeza - Automatics (feat. Steven King)
- 2008: Sonny Seeza - Dat Muzik (feat. Steven King)
- 2008: Sonny Seeza - Everything Iz Live
- 2008: Sonny Seeza - Find Out
- 2008: Sonny Seeza - Find Out (Remix) (feat. Steven King)
- 2008: Sonny Seeza - Still In Da Last Daze
- 2008: Sonny Seeza - They Feelin' Me Man
- 2008: Sonny Seeza - Tonite (feat. Greg Valentine)
- 2008: Sonny Seeza - U Love It
- 2008: Sonny Seeza - What It Looks Like (feat. Cyn Roc & Steven King)
- 2010: Sonny Seeza - We Live, We Live (a.k.a. Slow Simmer)
- 2010: Sonny Seeza - Talkin' Wit BIG
- 2012: Sonny Seeza - Brooklyn 2 Basel (International Version) (feat. Micky Gargano, Dr.Killman & Gesto)
- 2012: Sonny Seeza - Makin' Noise In Here [Prod. by DJ Idem] (Full Version)
- 2013: Sonny Seeza - Dirty Dagoes [Dirty Dagoes - DDMV2 (Dirty Dagoes Mixtape Vol. 2)]

== Guest appearances ==
- 1992: The Stretch Armstrong and Bobbito Show - ONYX & Jam Master Jay [December 3, 1992]
- 1993: Onyx - Freestyle over Ansel Collins's "Stalag 17" for Tim Westwood's "Capital Rap Show" [August 15, 1993]
- 1993: Onyx - Freestyle over Audio Two's "Top Billin'" for Tim Westwood's "Capital Rap Show" [August 15, 1993]
- 1995: Onyx - Freestyle on radio show "New York Live" on WNYU 89.1 (Hosted by Mr. Mayhem, Sunset & DJ Riz)
- 1996: Onyx - Freestyle on radio show "New York Live" on WNYU 89.1 (Hosted by Mr. Mayhem & DJ Riz)
- 1996: Tony Touch - Tape#50: Power Cypha (feat. Son-C, Clay Raider, Fredro, Sticky Fingaz, Dye Hard, Brother J, True Master, MC Search)
- 1998: Sonny Seeza & Sticky Fingaz - We Right Here (Freestyle)
- 1998: D.N.A. Disciples - Agony Of Defeat (feat. Sonny Seeza)
- 1999: The Unstoppable Def Jam Sampler - ONYX "See You In Hell"
- 2000: Sway & King Tech - "Wake Up Show Freestyles Vol. 6": Onyx, X1 and DMX - Freestyle
- 2008: Myster DL - The Bottom (feat. Sonny Seeza & Mr. Garth-Culti-Vader)
- 2008: X1 - I Know (feat. Myster DL & Sonsee)
- 2008: Mr. Garth-Culti-Vader - Trapped (feat. Sonny Seeza & Myster DL)
- 2009: Antwon - Crooked (feat. Sonny Seeza)
- 2010: Killah Priest - The Destroyer (feat. Sonny Seeza, iCON The Mic King, Steven King & Empuls)
- 2010: Killah Priest, Emplus, Steven King & Sonny Seeza - Dead End Streets (95 Mix)
- 2011: Steven King & Sonny Seeza - U HrD it 1st
- 2011: Pro-Logic - Music (feat. Khalel, Sonny Seeza)
- 2011: Antwon - My Community (feat. Sonny Seeza)
- 2012: Lantz - You're Dead (feat. Sonny Seeza)
- 2012: Lantz - You're Dead (O.G. Mix) (feat. Sonny Seeza)
- 2012: Copywrite - Starter Hats (feat. Sonny Seeza & Akala)
- 2014: Kaotic Concrete & Sonny Seeza - Step Up
- 2016: Snowgoons - The 90's Are Back (feat O.C., DoItAll (Lords Of The Underground), UG (Cella Dwellas), Sticky Fingaz (ONYX), Dres (Black Sheep), Nine, Sonny Seeza (ONYX), Ras Kass & Psycho Les (Beatnuts))
- 2017: Ali Starr - War Games (feat. Banga K & Sonny Seeza)
- 2017: In The Zone (International Cypher) - Episode 1 (feat. Chilz, La Nefera, Levo rimeD & Sonny Seeza)
- 2017: KD THE STRANGER x MADCHILD x SLAINE (La Coka Nostra) x DEMRICK (Serial Killers) x AFU-RA x SONNY SEEZA (Onyx) - PANIC ATTACK 2.0
- 2018: OptiMystic - Touch My Skill (feat. Sonny Seeza, JR, UG & Cappadonna)

== Music videos ==
- 2012: "Doc Help" | Directed by PW Films
- 2016: "Everywhere" | Directed by PW Films
