= Chyskillz =

American rapper

Background information
- Also known as: Chylow M. Parker; Chy-Skills; Chy-Skillz; CHY Skillz; Chyskills; Mr. Slam
- Born: Chylow Parker; July 19, 1969; Manhattan, New York City, U.S.
- Origin: Queens, New York City, U.S.
- Died: February 13, 2018 (aged 48)
- Genres: Hip hop; East Coast hip hop; hardcore hip hop; gangsta rap; jazz rap; new jack swing
- Occupations: Record producer; DJ; musician; rapper
- Instruments: Turntables; sampler; drum kit; electric guitar; keyboards
- Years active: 1991–2018
- Labels: Chyskillz; JMJ; Def Jam; Wasteland; 719

Chylow Parker (July 19, 1969 – February 13, 2018), known by the stage name Chyskillz, was an American record producer, DJ, musician, rapper and a member of multi-platinum hardcore rap group Onyx.

Chyskillz was discovered by Jam Master Jay of Run-D.M.C. who signed Onyx on his label JMJ Records. Onyx's debut album Bacdafucup, produced by Chyskillz, helped the group to become a nominee for "Favorite Rap/Hip-Hop New Artist" on American Music Awards and won "Best Rap Album" on Soul Train Music Awards.

During his career, Chylow Parker has worked with well-known artists such as Large Professor, Onyx, Run-D.M.C., Biohazard, Queen, Ice Cube, Shaquille O'Neal, LL Cool J, Public Enemy and many others. Many songs were re-mixed, re-mastered and re-released after 1997.

Five albums produced by Chyskillz, were certified as gold by the RIAA: Public Enemy Greatest Misses, Onyx Bacdafucup, Run-D.M.C. Down With The King, Shaquille O'Neal Shaq-Fu: Da Return and LL Cool J Mr. Smith. Two of them were certified as platinum: Onyx Bacdafucup and LL Cool J Mr. Smith.

== Early life ==
Chylow Parker was born in Manhattan, New York City, New York. At the age of 4, he and his family moved to Jamaica, Queens, New York. His family relocated to Flushing, Queens when Chyskillz was 10 years old. In Queens, he met Large Professor, Neek The Exotic and Mic Geronimo. Royal Flush used to live on the other side of the building he grew up in. Around this time, Chyskillz first touched a pair of Technics turntables. Chyskillz credits this moment as when he knew what he wanted to do with his life.

== Career ==
=== Jam Master Jay ===
Chyskillz started his music career deejaying for Large Professor, the founding member of Main Source. Chyskillz working on a recording studio as an engineer and producer on Neek The Exotic's project. One day he met Fredro Starr, who saw him deejaying. Fredro liked his beats, so he gave him his phone number. Onyx's manager, Jeff Harris, called him and invited him to Jam Master Jay's studio. When Chyskillz got with Jam Master Jay his first professional credit was the remix he did for Fam-Lee – "Runs in the Fam-Lee".

=== Onyx ===
Queens, New York City M.C. Neek The Exotic introduced DJ Chyskillz to the group Onyx in 1991. In Brian Coleman's book Check the Technique Fredro described how Onyx met their new producer:

"...We met Chyskillz on Jamaica Avenue one day. We was buying weed at the weed spot and Chy was chasing my truck down the street, yelling, 'I got beats!' His stuff back then was jazzy, on some Tribe Called Quest shit, but it was hot. I knew he could put beats together right away. We brought him into our zone and made him do some grimy shit."

When Chyskillz met Fredro and Sticky they were already signed to Def Jam. The group was called Onyx and consisted of Fredro Starr, Sticky Fingaz, Suave (a.k.a. Sonny Seeza) and Big DS. When Chyskillz first got with Onyx, they already have another producer, but their stuff was a little bit more commercial and friendly. Chyskillz let Fredro hear some beats and it started from there. Chyskillz began making beats for Onyx and the collaboration just worked. The first song that Chyskillz ever did for Onyx was "Nigga Bridges". He did one song for them and Russell Simmons heard it and give Onyx an EP deal for 6 songs. But they did 10 songs on a budget of 6 songs, so Russell Simmons give them an album deal.

Chyskillz and Jam Master Jay co-produced the hip-hop group Onyx's multi-platinum selling debut album called Bacdafucup. The album is described as having a "tense, wired edge that amplifies the vividness of the threatening lyrics. Sonically, it has a hardcore East Coast/New York City cast, full of throbbing bass and screeching siren-like effects".

Chyskillz drew notice for his work on hit songs like "Throw Ya Gunz" and "Slam" by Jam Master Jay of Run-DMC. Onyx's hit song Slam, which Chyskillz co-produced with Jam Master Jay, was included in music writer Bruce Pollock's Rock Song Index: The 7500 Most Important Songs for the Rock and Roll Era. It also made the Billboard Hot 100.

Chyskillz left Onyx in the summer of 1993 cause they don't need him like a producer record. So Chyskillz signed with Wasteland Records.

In May 2003 Chyskillz founded his own label "719 Music Inc.".

== Musical style ==
In an interview with NPR, hip hop artist and record producer Large Professor described working with Chyskillz on one of his first demos:

"...that's the style of production that we were doing at that time, where he would cut up "Synthetic Substitution" breakbeat on one tape. And you had the two and three tape decks, and he would put the tape in there. And then he would play that tape and overdub some bass lines."

== Last Year ==
In the last year of his life, Chyskillz actively traveled by plane, now and then visiting the cities of Dallas (Texas), Atlanta (Georgia), New York and Miramar (Florida). In all the cities he had friends and there he found new clients – rap artists, for whom he produced music. On the Facebook he uploaded videos he shot at the airport, marked "Where in the world is Chyskillz now" so that his friends would try to guess the city in which the producer is located, leaving comments under the post. And in the video he used to say: "It's about catch a flight, I'll might be in your city".

== Death ==
On July 5, 2017, Chyskillz was involved in a car accident and had surgery in October on his shoulder and was scheduled to possibly have back surgery soon. He was in a lot of pain and not working so much. He was in Queens, New York. On February 10, 2018 he was suffering a bad cold for two weeks and went to the hospital and they informed him that he had the flu, should never have gone to the studio and should have been resting. On February 12, Fredro and Sticky flew to New York. Fredro picked him up in Queens to go to the studio to do some remixing for the shows. Chyskillz was so pleased with this, he certainly agreed. After the session he came home late that evening around 2am. The next morning his family discovered him. Doctors say he suffered a heart attack. Next week he had to go to Miami, and then to Dallas for work. He just finished work on the project with De La Soul.

== Discography ==
=== Albums ===
With Onyx

- 1993: Bacdafucup

Solo albums

- 2014–2017: LP (unreleased)

=== Production ===
- 1991: Fam-Lee – "Runs in the Fam-Lee (It's The Fam-Lee Remix)" (from "Runs in the Fam-Lee (Vinyl Single)") – Remixed by Jam Master Jay & Chy-Skills
- 1992: Fam-Lee – "You're The One For Me (Hip-Hop Mix)" (from "You're The One For Me (Vinyl Single)") – X-Tra Flavor by Chy Skills
- 1992: Public Enemy – "Louder Than A Bomb (JMJ Telephone Tap Groove)" (from compilation album "Greatest Misses") – Remixing
- 1992: Bo$$ – "Livin' Loc'd" (from "Born Gangstaz") – Producer
- 1992: Onyx – "United States Ghetto (The U.S.G.)" – Producer
- 1992: Onyx – "Wake Up Dead, Nigga" (Throw Ya Gunz) (feat. Tek-9) – Version 1 (with different chorus at the beginning) – Producer
- 1992: Onyx – "Wake Up Dead, Nigga" (Throw Ya Gunz) (feat. Tek-9) – Version 2 – Producer
- 1993: Onyx – "Bacdafucup", "Bichasniguz", "Throw Ya Gunz", "Here 'N' Now", "Bus Dat Ass", "Da Mad Face Invasion", "Blac Vagina Finda", "Da Bounca Nigga", "Nigga Bridges" (co-producer), "Onyx Is Here", "Slam", "Stik 'N' Muve" (co-producer), "Bichasbootleguz", "Shifftee", "Phat ('N' All Dat)", "Getdafucout" (from "Bacdafucup") – Instrumentation, musician, producer
- 1993: Run-D.M.C. – "Three Little Indians", "Get Open" (from "Down with the King") – Producer
- 1993: Biohazard & Onyx – "Judgment Night" (from "Judgment Night (soundtrack)") – Producer
- 1993: Rumpletilskinz – "Mad M.F.'s" (from "What Is a Rumpletilskin?") – Mixing, producer
- 1993: Class A Felony – "I'm Not The Herb You're Lookin' 4 (CHY Skillz Remix)" (from "I'm Not The Herb You're Lookin' 4 (Vinyl Single)") – Remixing
- 1994: Kwazz E. Modoe – "Live The Life" (from Kwazz E. Modoe's demo tape) – Producer
- 1994: Queen – "Another One Bites The Dust" (Chyskillz Remix) (feat. Ice Cube, Hi-C (rapper born 1973) & Chyskillz) (from compilation album "BASIC Queen Bootlegs") – Remixing
- 1994: Shaquille O'Neal – "(So U Wanna Be) Hardcore", "Freaky Flow" (from "Shaq-Fu: Da Return") – Producer
- 1994: Sister Machine Gun – "Nothing (Chyskillz Re-Mix)" (from "Nothing (CD Single)") – Remixing
- 1995: Mic Geronimo – "Man of My Own" (from "The Natural") – Producer
- 1995: LL Cool J – "Mr. Smith" (from "Mr. Smith") – Producer
- 1996: Royal Flush – "Iced Down Medallions" (feat. Noreaga) (Chyskillz Remix) (from Various Artists – "Heartbeat" – Chill Factor Remixes) – Producer
- 1997: Royal Flush – "International Currency" (from "Ghetto Millionaire") – Producer
- 1997: Royal Flush – "Shines" (from "Ghetto Millionaire") – Mixing
- 1997: Royal Flush – "Family Problems" (from "Ghetto Millionaire") – Mixing
- 1997 – 2014: Producing of various hip-hop artists not subscribed to the top labels
- 2009: Skotadistes – "100 Mad Gang (Slam Again)" (feat. Fredro Starr) – Producer
- 2014: Sticky Fingaz – "I Don't Give A Shit" / "Ebenezer Scrooge" (feat. N.O.R.E.) – Producer
