= Shifftee =

Single by Onyx

from the album Bacdafucup
- B-side: "Bichasniguz"
- Released: August 30, 1993
- Recorded: 1992
- Studio: Soundtrack Studios, NYC
- Genre: East Coast hip hop; hardcore hip hop
- Length: 3:26
- Label: JMJ; Rush; Chaos
- Songwriters: Fred Scruggs; Kirk Jones; Tyrone Taylor; Chylow Parker
- Producers: Chyskillz; Jam Master Jay

Onyx singles chronology
"Slam" (1993)	"Shifftee" (1993)	"Live!!!" (1995)

Music video
- "Shifftee" on YouTube

"Shifftee" is a song by American hip hop group Onyx. It was released on August 30, 1993 by JMJ Records, Rush Associated Labels and Chaos Recordings as the third single from Onyx's debut album, Bacdafucup. The song was about being grimy and having that echo into a myriad of life situations.

Produced by Chyskillz and Jam Master Jay, "Shifftee" was not as successful as the first two singles, but it still managed to make to five different Billboard charts, peaking at 2 on the Hot Rap Singles.

The song was sampled by several rap artists including Mad Skillz, Raekwon, Marco Polo and Noreaga.

== Background ==
In an interview with HipHopDX Fredro Starr revealed the concept of the song:

"...The concept basically underlined what Onyx is. Onyx is the shiftee, low down, gritty, and grimy. So we made a song about it. We represent the struggle, we represent the out crowd, the dudes who can’t get in the club, the guys who got to sneak in the club, bumrush the door. Those dudes."

The single also included a remix of the song named "Shytizon Remix". This remix was made by Jam Master Jay's friend, Dex.

== Music video ==
The music video was directed by Parris Mayhew, known in the past as guitarist and songwriter of Cro-Mags. Drew Stone's production company Stone Films NYC was a producer of this video. The video was filmed on 42nd Street (Manhattan), NYC on June 3, 1993, and was premiered on The BOX on August 30, 1993. Director Parris Mayhew made two versions of the video: censorship and explicit. The explicit version begins with the fall of the Onyx logo with the inscription "Throw Ya Gunz", and the video itself begins with riots on the street: two groups of people run on each other from the opposite sides, and eventually they faced. The censorship version begins with neon signs indicate a pornographic theater. Onyx performs on the street near the signs as people around them jump around and dance. In an interview with HipHopDX Fredro Starr said that Lyor Cohen came up with the idea of using $3,000 multi-colored jackets in the video:

"...Lyor Cohen, President of Def Jam said, "Yo I'm gonna take y’all to this store, and I’m gonna get y'all some ill shit to wear!" We were like aight whatever, and we went to the store and the jackets we had in the "Shiftee" video was 3G's a piece."

Director Parris Mayhew also added that Lyor Cohen came up with idea how to shoot one scene with Sticky Fingaz and originally the video had to come out in black and white footage:

"...I do remember Lyor had a cool idea to incorporate in the video which I did shoot. He wanted Sticky lying on the ground face rapping. And the jackets were amazing, although after we shot it there was a lot of talk about how the jackets were "not Onyx" and they asked to make the footage black and white which I fought and ultimately it stayed in color.."

Parris Mayhew told that Fredro Starr was a screenwriter of one scene, which was later cut out by the decision of Russell Simmons:

"...I wrote the treatment of my idea for the video (just like I did for "Slam") and that's what we shot. I remember Sticky saying "I loved the line in the treatment, "like being on acid in a riot". The group did contribute one idea, a narrative scene with a white family at dinner serving pork. The child refuses to eat the pork and it is revealed he has a mad face tattoo. We did shoot Fredro's concept, to play at the beginning of the video but Russell said, "cut that out." So I did. The rest of the video was my concept. Great group, great song, great video."

== Appearance on television ==
- Onyx performed the song live on a syndicated music television show "It's Showtime at the Apollo" aired on November 6, 1993.
- "Shifftee" was performed live on Russell Simmons's Phat Jam at The Academy Theatre, NYC on June 18, 1993.
- The song was performed live on an American music-dance television program Soul Train at stage 30 at the Paramount Studios aired on December 11, 1993.

== Appearance in movies ==
- In 1993, the song appeared in New World Order, the movie by World Industries about skateboarding.
- In 2011, the song appeared in Stene 6-1, the movie by Stene Productions about skateboarding.
- The song was sampled by several rap artists including Mad Skillz, Raekwon, Marco Polo and Noreaga.

== Single track listing ==
=== A-Side ===
1. "Shifftee" (Radio Mix)- 3:27
2. "Shifftee" (Shytizon Remix)- 3:28
3. "Shifftee" (Spikinspan Remix)- 3:28
4. "Shifftee" (Acapella)- 2:32

=== B-Side ===
1. "Shifftee" (Instrumental)- 3:26
2. "Shifftee" (Instrumental Remix)- 3:28
3. "Bichasniguz" (LP Mix)- 3:54
4. "Bichasniguz" (Instrumental)- 3:54

== Personnel ==
- Onyx - performer, vocals
- Fredro Starr - performer, vocals
- Sticky Fingaz - performer, vocals
- Sonee Seeza - performer, vocals
- Big DS - performer, vocals
- Chyskillz - producer, performer (musician)
- Jam Master Jay - producer, performer (musician), remixer
- Dex - remixer
- Tony Dawsey - mastering
- Rich July - engineer
- John Kogan - engineer
- Gary Clugston - engineer
- Kevin Crouse - assistant engineer
- Troy Hightower - engineer
- Norman Bullard - assistant engineer

== Charts ==
=== Weekly charts ===
Chart (1993)	Peak position
US Billboard Hot 100	92
US Hot R&B/Hip-Hop Singles & Tracks (Billboard)	52
US Hot Rap Singles (Billboard)	2
US Hot Dance Music/Maxi-Singles Sales (Billboard)	14
US R&B/Hip-Hop Airplay (Billboard)	41
US Top 100 R&B Singles (Cashbox)	49
US Top 100 Pop Singles (Cashbox)	84
US Top 30 Rap Singles (Cashbox)	4
US Gavin Rap Retail Singles (Gavin Report)	14
US Mix Show Movers (Hitmakers)	23
