= Bacdafucup =

Studio album by Onyx
- Released: March 30, 1993
- Recorded: 1991–1992
- Genres: East Coast hip-hop; hardcore hip-hop; gangsta rap; comedy hip-hop
- Length: 47:27
- Labels: JMJ; Rush; Chaos
- Producers: Jam Master Jay (also exec.); Chyskillz; Kool Tee; Randy Allen; Jeff Harris

Onyx chronology
Bacdafucup (1993)	All We Got Iz Us (1995)

Singles from Bacdafucup
- 1. "Throw Ya Gunz" Released: November 27, 1992; 2. "Slam" Released: May 11, 1993; 3. "Shifftee" Released: August 30, 1993; 4. "Da Nex Niguz" Released: November 14, 1993

Bacdafucup is the debut studio album by American hip hop group Onyx, released on March 30, 1993, by JMJ Records, Rush Associated Labels and Chaos Recordings. The album was produced by Randy Allen (Executive Producer), Chyskillz, Jam Master Jay and Kool Tee.

Bacdafucup peaked at number 17 on the US Billboard 200, and number 8 on the Top R&B/Hip Hop Albums chart. The album was certified Platinum by the RIAA on October 25, 1993. In 1994, the album was nominated as "Rap/Hip-Hop New Artist" on American Music Awards of 1994 and won "Best Rap Album" on 1994 Soul Train Music Awards.

The album features three of the Billboard singles "Throw Ya Gunz", "Slam" and "Shifftee". The first single, "Throw Ya Gunz", received crossover radio success. Their breakout single, "Slam", received heavy airplay on both radio and television (MTV and BET), leading the song to reach number 4 on the Billboard Hot 100, and get Platinum on August 10, 1993.

In 2005, the album was broken down track-by-track by Onyx in Brian Coleman's book Check the Technique.

== Background ==
Fredro Starr, Big DS and Suave (also known as Sonny Seeza) met Jam Master Jay in a traffic jam at The Jones Beach GreekFest Festival on July 13, 1991. Jay allotted around two months for the group to produce a demo, but Suave and Big DS were unable to travel to the studio from Connecticut. Jeff Harris, the manager of Onyx, asked Fredro to come to the studio with his cousin, Kirk Jones, who would join the group and be known as "Sticky Fingaz". Jones was pursuing a solo career under the name Trop and working in the barbershop making a thousand dollars a week cutting high school. Fredro and Sticky Fingaz made two records, "Stik 'N' Muve" and "Exercise".

"...When we went to the studio we made two records. One was called 'Stick and Move' and the other was called 'Exercise'. And they both were crazy! When Jay heard the songs he was like, 'Yo, I love the group'."

Jam Master Jay liked these songs and that's how Sticky joined the group, because Jay said, “If Sticky ain't in the group, it ain't no group!”. Jay signed the group to his label, JMJ Records, for a single deal, then for an EP deal followed by an album deal because they did 10 songs on a budget of 6 songs.

== Recording and production ==
In 1991, despite the reproaches from Fredro, the Onyx's music producer, B-Wiz, sold his drum machine SP-12 and went to Baltimore to sell drugs, and eventually was killed in Baltimore. Thus, all Onyx records were lost.

"...When I met Jam Master Jay, I told B-Wiz, who was doin’ his thing, sellin’ drugs, goin’ to Baltimore. I said, “Yo, don’t go down South, I just met Jam Master Jay.” He went down south, he got murdered... When he got murdered, we lost that sound. When we lost that sound, that was the end."

The group needed a new music producer. In Brian Coleman's book Check the Technique Fredro described how Onyx met their future producer:

"...We met Chyskillz on Jamaica Avenue one day. We was buying weed at the weed spot and Chy was chasing my truck down the street, yelling, 'I got beats!' His stuff back then was jazzy, on some Tribe Called Quest shit, but it was hot. I knew he could put beats together right away. We brought him into our zone and made him do some grimy shit."

Chyskillz was chosen as the main producer of the album, and produced 16 of the 18 songs. The first song that Chyskillz ever did for ONYX was "Nigga Bridges".

Jam Master Jay attended the studios during the recording of every song and was guided by the group in the process of recording the album, applying his hand as a producer to many tracks. Sticky says of the late JMJ: “Jay was very hands-on, one hundred percent. He was always there in the studio with us. We learned everything from him. He was our mentor”.

Jam Master Jay's friend, Kool Tee, also known as a member of rap groups Solo Sounds and The Afros, produced two songs on the album: "Atak Of Da Bal-Hedz" and "Da Nex Niguz".

Jeff Harris was credited as the producer of three songs on this album, "Blac Vagina Finda", "Nigga Bridges" and "Stik 'N' Muve", but in fact was just the group's manager since the release of their first single in 1990; after the release of Onyx's first album, they parted ways.

The recording of the album began in September 1991 and ended in August 1992. At the time, Fredro Starr was acting in the movie Strapped, from the set of which he went to the studio to record the album. The album was recorded in seven different studios in New York.

During the recording of the album, Fredro Starr and Sticky Fingaz were still working at the Nu Tribe Barber Shop on Jamaica Avenue in Queens, New York City until they heard their song "Throw Ya Gunz" on the radio in November 1992.

Fredro says about the group's state of mind when recording Bacdafucup:

"...While we were recording the album, niggas was on LSD the whole time, straight up. We was dropping papers, taking meth tabs, during that whole album. That's just the creative side of making music. We were like Jimi Hendrix. And that's partially what kept our energy going at that high level. We had that battery pack. LSD was our secret weapon. It kept us creative."

Sticky Fingaz credits Bacdafucup with introducing slamdancing, grimy delivery, and bald head fashion to hip-hop.

== Conception of album title ==
The title track, "Bacdafucup", was one of the first songs Onyx recorded. At first it was just a skit, from which they made an intro and filmed a video for. Then they recorded a complete song, "Onyx Is Here".

"...Bacdafucup was probably like one of the first joints we made, it turned out to be like a skit at first, then we did an intro and video to it. Then we did this song but once we did that song, that kind of like gave us our direction, it kind of described what we was feeling. The whole industry gotta back the fuck up. Das EFX gotta back the fuck up, Naughty By Nature gotta back the fuck up, Cypress Hill gotta back the fuck up"

Spelling of "Bacdafucup" as well as "United States Ghetto" was made up by Suave (also known as Sonny Seeza).

In 2016, FreshPaintNYC revisiting the place of filming "Bacdafucup": Shinbone Alley south, NoHo, Manhattan, NYC.

== Lyrics ==
The lyrics on every song on Bacdafucup explain an aspect of life for the members of Onyx. The first single, "Throw Ya Gunz", signifies the Jamaican tradition of a gun salute as a show of respect to the men on the mic ("buc buc like ya just don't care").

"USG", which stands for United States Ghetto, stresses their belief that no matter what city you go to, all ghettos in this country are similar. Onyx talk about the difficulties faced when living in the ghetto.

"...We was talking about the life of "United Statez Ghetto" ("U.S.G."), the hardship of the ghetto. We was speaking for the ghetto. It wasn't just about sticking people up (*robbing people) because that's what people doing in the ghetto, this is one part of this."

On another choice selection, Onyx modifies the old childhood jingle "London Bridge" to "Nigga Bridges", while "Bichasbootleguz" bluntly describes Onyx's attitude towards the bootleg industry.

One of the album's defining features is the altered spelling of words and phrases; for example, the song "Phat ('N' All Dat)". Sticky Fingaz invented the word "phat", with Russell Simmons taking the word and making the clothing line Phat Farm around it.

The album contains a huge amount of profanity, which in itself prevented the songs being played on many radio stations. However, the song "Slam" was broadcast on all cable channels, including BET and MTV.

== Album cover ==
Sticky Fingaz came up with the idea to use Plexiglas for the album cover and for the video for "Throw Ya Gunz". The group members stood on Plexiglas while the photographer, Gary Spector, took the pictures. Sticky wanted people to see the group from under their shoes.

== Singles ==
Four singles were released from this album: "Throw Ya Gunz", "Slam", "Shifftee" and "Da Nex Niguz"/"Da Nex DingDong"

The first single, "Throw Ya Gunz" was released on November 27, 1992. Produced by Chylow Parker, "Throw Ya Gunz" was a success and made it to four Billboard charts, including #1 on the Hot Rap Singles for two weeks. The song achieved even greater success in the UK, where it peaked at #34 on the UK Top 40 in 1993. The song was used as a promo for the 18th season of the American animated sitcom South Park, and was sampled by more than 50 rap artists including Jeru The Damaja, The Notorious B.I.G., Eminem, Vinnie Paz and A$AP Mob.

The second single, "Slam", was released on May 11, 1993. The song introduced slamdancing into hip-hop. "Slam" was Onyx's breakthrough single, making it to number 4 on the US Billboard Hot 100 and was the group's second straight single to make it to number 1 on the Hot Rap Singles for two weeks. The single was first certified Gold on July 7, 1993 before being certified Platinum on August 10, 1993. According to Fredro Starr, the single sold about 5 million copies. The song was sampled by more than 25 rap artists including GZA, Eminem, PMD, Shaquille O'Neal and Krazy Drayz of Das EFX.

The third single, "Shifftee", was released on August 30, 1993. Produced by Chyskillz and Jam Master Jay, "Shifftee" was not as successful as the first two singles, but still managed to appear on five different Billboard charts, peaking at 2 on the Hot Rap Singles. The song was sampled by several rap artists including Mad Skillz, Raekwon, Marco Polo and Noreaga.

The fourth single, "Da Nex Niguz"/"Da Nex DingDong", was released on November 14, 1993, accompanied by a promotional video.

== 25th anniversary ==
Several different media have written articles dedicated to the 25th anniversary of the release of the album. Sha Be Allah of The Source said, "Onyx made their claim to fame with their trademark “mad face”, bald heads and all black everything. Many copycats came after these guys, but their mark on the game is definitely unparalleled. Salute to Fredro, Sticky, Seez, and a big RIP to DS."

Paul Meara of AmbrosiaForHeads said, "Leading up to the Bacdafucup‘s March 30 drop was their single "Throw Ya Guns," released in November 1992. It exemplified ONYX's violent and menacing musical style and became a precursor to perhaps the group's most famous single ever in "Slam,” which eventually would make it all the way to #4 on Billboard's Hot 100 chart."

Vin Rican, the host of the program "Wax Only" which appears on the YouTube channel of LA radio station KPWR, made a mix composed of the drums used to create the album Bacdafucup.

The Bronx, NYC videographer Olise Forel made a hip-hop cover animation.

== Appearance in movies and on television ==
- "Slam" has been used in movies such as How High and TV shows such as The Cleveland Show, The Tonight Show Starring Jimmy Fallon and Lip Sync Battle.
- Five songs from Bacdafucup were included in Forest Whitaker's HBO drama Strapped: "Throw Ya Gunz", "Bichasniguz", "Nigga Bridges", "Bacdafucup", "Attack of da Bal-Hedz".

== Critical response ==
Professional ratings
Review scores
Source	Rating
AllMusic	4/5 stars
Entertainment Weekly	A−
RapReviews	8/10
The Source	3.5/5 stars
The Village Voice	C+

Bacdafucup was met with generally positive reviews from music critics. Rolling Stone wrote: "Four baldheads from Queens, N.Y., with Jam Master Jay of Run-D.M.C. co-producing, these menaces crank up monolithic old-school noise, thick as a brick and iceberg cold." James Bernard of Entertainment Weekly rated the album an A−, saying, "...bare-knuckles hip-hop featuring raw beats and four manic MCs competing for center stage. Onyx's confrontational attitude is so over-the-top that its enthusiasm becomes infectious..." (Entertainment Weekly magazine, Issue No. 165 – April 9, 1993, p. 54).

Ghetto Communicator of The Source gave the album three and a half stars out of five, saying, "...an extremely dope vision of ugliness that is not for the sensitive....the lyrical chemistry between Sticky Fingaz and Fredro Starr combined with the phat production work of Chyskills (Large Professor's old school homey) and Kool Tee blows shit into orbit and leaves you open for more..." (The Source magazine, Issue #42 - March, 1993, p. 79).

Spin said: "...'Move back, muthafuckas! The Onyx is here!'...When the gentlemen of Onyx beseech this of you, it would be within your best interest to heed their desires and indeed withdraw as requested ...Onyx raps it hard like it is..." (Spin magazine June, 1993, p. 18). Gil Griffin of The Washington Post said that Onyx's lyrics about beat-downs, stickups and gun-toting may be more real than fantasy.

Steve 'Flash' Juon of RapReviews gave the album eight out of ten, saying, "For the most part, the plusses on this album are many for fans of hardcore rap, with Sticky Fingaz providing the needed comic relief if and when things get too serious. Other than the six unnecessary skits and a couple of throwaway songs that don't hold up to the high standard the group themselves set, "Bacdafucup" is a solid debut album for Onyx from beginning to finish." Deedub of Time Is Illmatic said "Jam Master Jay insisting that Sticky Fingaz be added to Onyx. There is no question that the self-proclaimed “mad author of anguish” is the chief emcee and carries the lyrical load throughout BacDaFucUp. Led by Sticky, Onyx's animated hyper-energy and horrorgangster rhymes mixed with quality and consistently dark production, make BacDaFucUp an overall solid album and very entertaining listen."

== Accolades ==
In 1998, The Source selected the album as one of "100 Best Albums". In 1999, Ego Trip's editors ranked album in their list "Hip Hop's 25 Greatest Albums by Year 1993" in Ego Trip's Book of Rap Lists. In 2010, Complex put the album in their list "Do It Again: When Rappers Redo Their Album Covers". In 2012, Complex put the album in their list "The 50 Best Rap Album Titles Ever". In 2013, Spin put the album in their list "The 50 Best Rap Albums from 1993".

Publication	Country	Accolade	Year	Rank
The Source	United States	100 Best Albums	1998	*
Ego Trip	United States	Hip Hop's 25 Greatest Albums by Year 1993	1999	8
Complex	United States	Do It Again: When Rappers Redo Their Album Covers	2010	*
Complex	United States	The 50 Best Rap Album Titles Ever	2012	18
Spin	United States	The 50 Best Rap Albums From 1993	2013	*

== Track listing ==
#	Title	Performer(s)	Producer(s)	Musician(s)	Length
1	"Bacdafucup"	Sticky Fingaz; Fredro Starr	Chyskillz; Jam Master Jay	Chyskillz	0:48
2	"Bichasniguz"	First verse: Fredro Starr; Second verse: Big DS; Third verse: Suave; Fourth verse: Sticky Fingaz	Jam Master Jay; Chyskillz	Chyskillz; Jam Master Jay	3:54
3	"Throw Ya Gunz"	First verse: Fredro Starr; Second verse: Suave; Third verse: Sticky Fingaz; Outro: Onyx	Chyskillz	Chyskillz	3:16
4	"Here 'N' Now"	Intro: Onyx; First verse: Suave; Second verse: Fredro Starr; Third verse: Sticky Fingaz; Outro: Onyx	Chyskillz		3:40
5	"Bust dat Ass"	Fredro Starr; Sticky Fingaz; Suave	Chyskillz; Jam Master Jay		0:38
6	"Atak of da Bal-Hedz"	First verse: Sticky Fingaz; Second verse: Fredro Starr; Chorus: Onyx; Third verse: Suave; Fourth verse: Sticky Fingaz; Fifth verse: Big DS; Chorus: Onyx; Sixth verse: Fredro Starr; Seventh verse: Suave; Eighth verse: Sticky Fingaz; Outro: Onyx	Kool Tee		3:13
7	"Da Mad Face Invasion"	Fredro Starr; Sticky Fingaz	Chyskillz; Jam Master Jay	Chyskillz	0:46
8	"Blac Vagina Finda"	Intro: Sticky Fingaz, Fredro Starr; First verse: Big DS; Second verse: Sticky Fingaz; Chorus: Sticky Fingaz, Fredro Starr; Third verse: Fredro Starr; Jam Master Jay; Chyskillz; Jeff Harris (co-producer); Jam Master Jay; Chyskillz	3:12		
9	"Da Bounca Nigga"	Big AL (a.k.a. The Bouncer); Fredro Starr; Suave	Jam Master Jay; Chyskillz		0:29
10	"Nigga Bridges"	Intro: Fredro Starr, Sticky Fingaz; First verse: Fredro Starr; Chorus: Onyx; Second verse: Suave; Third verse: Big DS; Fourth verse: Sticky Fingaz; Outro: Onyx	Jam Master Jay; Jeff Harris; Chyskillz (co-producer)	Jam Master Jay; Chyskillz; Mac Gellenon (trumpet); Reggie Woods (saxophone)	4:12
11	"Onyx Is Here"	First verse: Fredro Starr, Suave; Chorus: Onyx; Second verse: Fredro Starr, Suave; Third verse: Sticky Fingaz	Chyskillz; Jam Master Jay	Chyskillz	3:03
12	"Slam"	First verse: Fredro Starr; Chorus: Onyx; Second verse: Suave; Third verse: Sticky Fingaz	Chyskillz; Jam Master Jay		3:38
13	"Stik 'N' Muve"	Intro: Onyx; First verse: Suave; Second verse: Fredro Starr; Chorus: Onyx; Third verse: Sticky Fingaz; Fourth verse: Fredro Starr; Fifth verse: Sticky Fingaz; Outro: Fredro Starr	Jeff Harris; Jam Master Jay; Chyskillz (co-producer)	Jam Master Jay; Chyskillz; Big Steve; Mac Gellenon (trumpet)	3:20
14	"Bichasbootleguz"	Fredro Starr, Sticky Fingaz, Suave	Chyskillz; Jam Master Jay	Chyskillz	0:27
15	"Shifftee"	First verse: Fredro Starr; Chorus: Onyx; Second verse: Suave; Third verse: Sticky Fingaz; Outro: Onyx	Chyskillz; Jam Master Jay	Chyskillz	4:19
16	"Phat ('N' All Dat)"	First verse: Fredro Starr; Chorus: Onyx; Second verse: Suave; Third verse: Sticky Fingaz; Outro: Onyx	Chyskillz		3:17
17	"Da Nex Niguz"	Intro: Fredro Starr; First verse: Sticky Fingaz; Second verse: Fredro Starr; Chorus: Onyx; Third verse: Suave; Fourth verse: Fredro Starr; Fifth verse: Sticky Fingaz; Outro: Onyx	Kool Tee		4:07
18	"Getdafucout"	Intro: Onyx; Outro: Sticky Fingaz	Jam Master Jay; Chyskillz	Jam Master Jay; Chyskillz	1:09

== Personnel ==
- Onyx - performer, vocals
- Fredro Starr - performer, vocals
- Sticky Fingaz - performer, vocals
- Suave - performer, vocals
- Big DS - performer, vocals
- Jam Master Jay - executive producer, producer
- Randy Allen - executive producer
- Chyskillz - producer
- Jeff Harris - producer
- Jeff Trotter - A&R executive, editing, mastering
- Tony Dawsey - mastering

== Awards and nominations ==
In 1994 the album was nominated as "Rap/Hip-Hop New Artist" on American Music Awards of 1994 and won "Best Rap Album" on 1994 Soul Train Music Awards.

Year	Award	Nominated work	Category	Result
1994	American Music Awards of 1994	"Bacdafucup"	Rap/Hip-Hop New Artist	Nominated
1994	1994 Soul Train Music Awards	"Bacdafucup"	Best Rap Album	Won

== Charts ==
=== Weekly charts ===
Chart (1993)	Peak position
UK Top 75	59
US Billboard 200	17
US Top R&B/Hip-Hop Albums (Billboard)	8
US Gavin Rap Retail Albums (Gavin Report)	2
US Retail Sales Albums (The Network Forty)	11
US Top 100 Pop Albums (Cashbox)	18
US Top 75 R&B Albums (Cashbox)	7
US Top 30 Hip-Hop Albums (Cashbox)	3
US BRE Albums Chart (BRE Magazine)	22

=== Year-end charts ===
Chart (1993)	Position
US Billboard 200 (Billboard)	65
US Top R&B/Hip Hop Albums (Billboard)	22
US Top 50 R&B Albums (Cashbox)	14

== Certifications ==
Region	Certification	Certified units/sales
Canada (Music Canada)	Gold	50,000^{^}
United States (RIAA)	Platinum	1,000,000^{^}
^{^} Shipments figures based on certification alone.
