= Throw Ya Gunz =

Single by Onyx

from the album Bacdafucup
- B-side: "Blac Vagina Finda"
- Released: November 27, 1992
- Recorded: January 1992
- Studio: Apollo Studios (New York City)
- Genre: East Coast hip hop; hardcore hip hop; gangsta rap
- Length: 3:16
- Label: JMJ; Rush; Chaos
- Songwriters: Fred Scruggs; Kirk Jones; Tyrone Taylor; Chylow Parker
- Producer: Chylow Parker

Onyx singles chronology
| "Ah, And We Do It Like This" (1990) | "Throw Ya Gunz" (1992) | "Slam" (1993) |

Music video
- "Throw Ya Gunz" on YouTube

"Throw Ya Gunz" is the first single by American hip hop group Onyx from their debut album, Bacdafucup. It was released on November 27, 1992, by JMJ, Rush Associated Labels and Chaos Recordings. Produced by Jam Master Jay, Chylow Parker, and Randy Allen (Executive Producer), "Throw Ya Gunz" was a success and made it to four Billboard charts, including number 1 on the Hot Rap Singles for two weeks. The song achieved even greater success in the UK, where it peaked at number 34 on the UK Top 40 in 1993.

== Original version ==
The original version, "Wake Up Dead, Nigga," featured obscure New York rapper Tek-9, and was not released on any of Onyx's studio albums. Tek-9 rapped the opening verse and Jamaican hook on the second demo version. Eventually, the tune appeared on 1993's Bacdafucup, where it was one of eight cuts recorded in the studio at the Apollo Theater in Harlem.

== Lyrical content and message ==
The song signifies the Jamaican tradition of a gun salute as a show of respect to the men on the mic. Def Jam/RAL director of A&R Traci Waples says, "The phrase isn't about violence; it's a way to salute hip-hop". (from Billboard magazine - May 15, 1993)

In 1995, in an interview on BET's Teen Summit Sticky Fingaz explains the meaning of this song: "'Throw Ya Gunz' is a salute to hip hop. Just like in the army. Because this is war out there. So we are army. We got a 21-gun salute to all the people who is dead. It's not about pro-violence. I'm not saying throw your guns and shoot the next brother, i'm saying throw your guns in the air. They think a gun is a violent instrument, which is not. Guns don't kill people! People kill people!"

== Radio ==
In November 1992, the single was delivered to radio, and although it was getting played, program directors "were complaining" about the profanity and violence in the lyrics. Julie Greenwald, Lyor Cohen's assistant, remembers that time:

"...Nobody wanted to play [the video], but the places it did get played, it was so reactive, and so potent. We circumvented it with the vinyl out on the streets and with the video at the local video outlets, and we got such major response off that, and we knew that we were developing something so cool."

Funkmaster Flex was one of the first DJs who played "Throw Ya Gunz" on his show Friday Night Street Jam on the radio Hot 97. Especially for this show, Onyx recorded a promo jingle for the radio.

WPGC-FM (95.5), Washington's top-rated radio station, rejected Onyx's hit single "Throw Ya Guns in the Air" and no longer plays songs that could be construed as advocating violence.

== Music video ==
The music video was Diane Martel's directorial debut. The video was shot in South Jamaica, Queens. Real guns, including Tec-9s and Mac-10s provided by Jam Master Jay, were used. The music video begins with a group of people running on the beach. Onyx performs on the beach and in a darkened room. A large group of people dance with the song. Sticky Fingaz came up with idea to use Plexiglas during filming the video. The video was premiered on The BOX in December 1992.

The video can be found on the 2008 DVD Onyx: 15 Years Of Videos, History And Violence and on 2009's Def Jam's DVD Def Jam 25: VJ Bring That Video Back.

== Appearances ==
On April 25, 1994, Onyx was nominated for five awards on The Source's "1st annual Source Awards" at the Paramount Theatre at Madison Square Garden, but the group did not win. In response, out of anger and frustration, Sticky Fingaz fired a gun while performing the song. Security would later rush the group backstage to find the gun, only for the gun to not be found.

Onyx performed the song live on the UK TV-show "The Word" aired on November 19, 1993.

== Legacy ==
Fredro Starr knew the song would be successful:

"...With that beat on "Throw Ya Gunz", I knew it was going to be a serious record. I knew it would be big, a hip-hop anthem, because that's what we made it for. We planned it out. It was for the streets, it was energetic, and it was grimy. That single went gold, so Def Jam was very happy about that."

In 2010, Fat Joe recalled how he first heard the Onyx's song "Throw Ya Gunz" in Club 2000 in Harlem, saying "it was one of the most classic hip-hop events I've ever been to".

The song was used as a promo for the 18th season of the American animated sitcom South Park. Creative director Robert Sosin told why he chose this song:

"...For the South Park campaign of 2014, we wanted a clear simple message to get people to tune in and a visual theme that could unite creative across many platforms. The message I came up was HEADS UP and the image was the iconic South Park heads. For this promo spot we used 298 different heads from South Park and licensed Onyx's track "Throw Ya Gunz", and then designer Brandon Campbell was able to take my direction of "Think fallen leaves on top of a speaker, rippling as they are moved by the bass waves" and turn it into this club banger."

The song is featured in Forest Whitaker's award-winning 1993 HBO drama Strapped and in a 2003 video game Def Jam Vendetta.

== Accolades ==
In 1999, Ego Trip's editors ranked the song in their list Hip Hop's 40 Greatest Singles by Year 1993 in Ego Trip's Book of Rap Lists. In 2010, Robert Dimery included the song in his book 1001 Songs You Must Hear Before You Die: And 10,001 You Must Download. In 2010, Complex put the video on the song in their list The Biggest Arsenals in Rap Videos. In 2016, XXL put the song in their list 50 Violent Rap Lyrics That Will Make You Cringe.

| Publication | Country | Accolade | Year | Rank |
|---|---|---|---|---|
| Ego Trip | United States | Hip Hop's Greatest Singles by Year 1980–1998 | 1999 | 8 |
| The Source | United States | Top 151 Rap Songs of All Time | 2003 | 144 |
| Time Out | United States | 1000 Songs to Change Your Life | 2008 | * |
| Robert Dimery | United States | 10,001 Songs You Must Hear | 2010 | * |
| XXL | United States | 250 Greatest Hip-Hop Songs 1990–1999 | 2011 | 51 |
| XXL | United States | 50 Violent Rap Lyrics That Will Make You Cringe | 2016 | * |

== Single track listing ==
=== A-Side ===
1. "Throw Ya Gunz" (Radio Version) - 3:17
2. "Throw Ya Gunz" (LP Version) - 3:14
3. "Throw Ya Gunz" (Instrumental) - 3:17

=== B-Side ===
1. "Blac Vagina Finda" (LP Version) - 3:13
2. "Blac Vagina Finda" (Instrumental) - 3:10

== Personnel ==
- Onyx - performer, vocals
- Fredro Starr - performer, vocals
- Sticky Fingaz - performer, vocals
- Sonee Seeza - performer, vocals
- Big DS - performer, vocals
- Jason Mizell - executive producer, producer ("Blac Vagina Finda")
- Randy Allen - executive producer
- Chylow Parker - producer
- Tony Dawsey - mastering
- Troy Hightower - engineer
- Norman Bullard - assistant engineer

== Charts ==
=== Weekly charts ===
| Chart (1993) | Peak position |
|---|---|
| US Billboard Hot 100 | 81 |
| US Hot R&B/Hip-Hop Singles & Tracks (Billboard) | 61 |
| US Hot Rap Singles (Billboard) | 1 |
| US Hot Dance Music/Maxi-Singles Sales (Billboard) | 24 |
| US Radio Rap Singles (Gavin Report) | 11 |
| US Gavin Rap Retail Singles (Gavin Report) | 4 |
| US Top 30 Rap Singles (Cashbox) | 2 |
| UK Top 40 | 34 |
| UK European Hot 100 Singles (Music & Media) | 79 |
| UK Singles (Official Charts Company) | 196 |
