= Judgment Night (soundtrack) =

Soundtrack album by various artists
- Released: September 14, 1993
- Recorded: 1993
- Genres: Rap rock; rap metal; alternative metal
- Length: 45:11
- Labels: Immortal, Epic Soundtrax
- Producers: Boo-Yaa T.R.I.B.E., Chyskillz, Cypress Hill, De La Soul, Faith No More, Fatal, Helmet, House of Pain, Living Colour, Andy MacPherson, J Mascis, Mudhoney, DJ Muggs, Pearl Jam, Rick Rubin, Run-D.M.C., Sir Mix-a-Lot, Sonic Youth, Teenage Fanclub, Therapy?

Singles from Judgment Night Soundtrack
- 1. "Judgment Night" Released: 1993; 2. "Just Another Victim" Released: August 17, 1993; 3. "Another Body Murdered" Released: October 25, 1993; 4. "Fallin'" Released: 1994

Judgment Night is the soundtrack to the 1993 film of the same name. It was released on September 14, 1993, through Immortal Records and Epic Soundtrax and was produced by many of the album's performers. Every song on the soundtrack was a collaboration between hip-hop artists and rock/metal artists. The album peaked at #17 on the Billboard 200 and spawned four singles, "Fallin'" by Teenage Fanclub and De La Soul, "Another Body Murdered" by Faith No More and Boo-Yaa T.R.I.B.E., "Just Another Victim" by Helmet and House of Pain, and "Judgment Night" by Biohazard and Onyx.

== Production and release ==
Billboard explains that the soundtrack album "paired hip-hop artists with modern rock acts," and The A.V. Club wrote that its musical pairings were "designed to capitalize on the burgeoning popularity of rap-rock." A.V. Club further opines that although there had been "sporadic successful mergers" between individual artists in the metal and rap genres by 1993, "no one had yet thought to do an entire album based on getting established rap and rock artists in the same studio to hash something out. That revolutionary concept in doubling your market share fell to Happy Walters." According to Rolling Stone, "it is largely due to the initiative of [soundtrack producer] Happy Walters... that so many leading hip-hop and alternative artists were assembled for the soundtrack," with Walters bringing in groups such as Pearl Jam, Boo-Yaa T.R.I.B.E., Sonic Youth, Cypress Hill, and Faith No More as collaborators on new material. The Judgment Night soundtrack album was released by Immortal Records with distribution by Epic Records.

According to DJ Muggs of Cypress Hill, Faith No More, Helmet and Sonic Youth were the first bands to show interest in the project. He recalled, "Sonic Youth, Helmet, their managers were super supportive. Helmet were super into it. Faith No More was really into it. Those three, I think, were the first ones to come onboard, which were all credible and cool at the time. Which really helped with others." A collaboration between Tool and Rage Against the Machine was attempted for the album, but neither band was happy with the results. The untitled song, commonly referred to as "Can't Kill the Revolution", has never been officially released, but a demo version spread through fan bootleg networks such as Napster and Limewire.

Kurt Cobain, Metallica, Biggie Smalls, Public Enemy, Ministry, and Ice Cube were asked to be a part of it however they rejected it. "

== Reception ==
Professional ratings
Review scores
Source	Rating
AllMusic	3/5 stars
Calgary Herald	B+
Robert Christgau	A−
Entertainment Weekly	A
Music Week	3/5 stars
Q Magazine	3/5 stars
Rolling Stone	4/5 stars
Select	4/5 medals

Rolling Stone said of the soundtrack, "Judgment Night's bracing rap rock is like the wedding of hillbilly and 'race' music that started the whole thing in the first place....It's an aspiring re-birth". Entertainment Weekly said they "can't vouch for the film, but the album is a MUST". Q Magazine said the soundtrack "suggests that the future for both metal and rap as a kind of agit prop soapbox style is secure".

Due to the success of the Judgment Night soundtrack, Walters took a similar approach to the soundtrack of the 1997 film Spawn (mixing rock/electronic) and the soundtrack of the 2002 film Blade II (mixing electronic/hip-hop).

== Score album ==
Intrada released a CD of Alan Silvestri's score for the film. Musician said of the score, "Tear down a few walls and it's amazing what tumbles out".

== Track listing ==
No.	Title	Writer(s)	Producer(s)	Length
1.	"Just Another Victim" (Helmet & House of Pain)	Page Nye Hamilton; Henry G. Bogdan; John D. Stanier, Jr.; Erik Schrody; Leor Dimant	Helmet; House of Pain	4:23
2.	"Fallin'" (Teenage Fanclub & De La Soul)	Teenage Fanclub; De La Soul; Tom Petty; Jeff Lynne	Teenage Fanclub; De La Soul; Andy MacPherson	4:28
3.	"Me, Myself & My Microphone" (Living Colour & Run-D.M.C.)	William Calhoun; Corey Glover; Vernon Reid; Doug Wimbish; Joseph "Run" Simmons; Darryl "DMC" McDaniels; Jason "JMJ" Mizell	Run D.M.C.; Living Colour	3:10
4.	"Judgment Night" (Biohazard & Onyx)	Evan Seinfeld; Danny Schuler; William Graziadei; Robert Hambel; Fred Scruggs; Kirk Jones; Tyrone Taylor; Marlon Fletcher; Chylow Parker	Chyskillz	4:35
5.	"Disorder" (Slayer & Ice-T)	Kerry King; Tom Araya; Ice-T; Walter Buchan; John Duncan; Gary McCormack	Rick Rubin	4:58
6.	"Another Body Murdered" (Faith No More & Boo-Yaa T.R.I.B.E.)	Mike Bordin; Roddy Bottum; Billy Gould; Mike Patton; Boo-Ya T.R.I.B.E.	Ghetto Guerillas; Boo-Ya T.R.I.B.E.; Faith No More	4:24
7.	"I Love You, Mary Jane" (Sonic Youth & Cypress Hill)	Lawrence Muggerud; Louis Freese; Senen Reyes; Kim Gordon; Thurston Moore; Lee Ranaldo; Steve Shelley	Muggs	3:52
8.	"Freak Momma" (Mudhoney & Sir Mix-A-Lot)	Mudhoney; Sir Mix-A-Lot	Mudhoney; Sir Mix-A-Lot	4:00
9.	"Missing Link" (Dinosaur Jr. & Del the Funky Homosapien)	J Mascis; Teron Jones	J Mascis	3:59
10.	"Come and Die" (Therapy? & Joe Fatal)	Therapy?; Joe Fatal; T-Ray	T-Ray	4:27
11.	"Real Thing" (Pearl Jam & Cypress Hill)	Freese; Reyes; Muggerud; Stone Gossard; Jeff Ament; Dave Abbruzzese	Pearl Jam; Cypress Hill	3:33

Notes

- "Disorder" is a medley of three songs by The Exploited: "War", "UK '82", and "Disorder"

== Charts ==
Chart (1993–94)	Peak position
Canada Top Albums/CDs (RPM)	22
German Albums (Offizielle Top 100)	38
New Zealand Albums (RMNZ)	8
Swedish Albums (Sverigetopplistan)	19
Swiss Albums (Schweizer Hitparade)	44
UK Compilation Albums (Official Charts)	35
US Billboard 200	17

== Certifications ==
Region	Certification	Certified units/sales
United States (RIAA)	Gold	500,000^{^}
^{^} Shipments figures based on certification alone.
