= Big DS =

American rapper and record producer

Background information
- Also known as: Big D'Estical
- Born: Marlon G. Fletcher; July 29, 1971; Queens, New York City, U.S.
- Died: May 22, 2003 (aged 31) Queens, New York City, U.S.
- Genres: East Coast hip hop; hardcore hip hop; gangsta rap
- Occupations: Rapper; record producer
- Years active: 1988–2003
- Labels: JMJ; Def Jam; Illyotic Music
- Formerly of: Onyx

Marlon G. Fletcher (July 29, 1971 – May 22, 2003), better known under his stage name Big DS, was an American rapper and record producer from Queens, New York.

He was co-founder of the hardcore rap group Onyx. As a part of Onyx Big DS released one album "Bacdafucup" and 8 singles on JMJ Records and featured on 1993's Judgment Night (soundtrack). As a part of Onyx Big DS was nominated as "Rap/Hip-Hop New Artist" on American Music Awards of 1994 and won "Best Rap Album" on 1994 Soul Train Music Awards.

== Early life ==
Fletcher was born in South Ozone Park, Queens. He studied at John Adams High School (Queens). In 1988, after graduating from school at the age of 17, Fredro Starr created the rap group Onyx along with his schoolmates Big DS and Suavé (also known as Sonny Seeza). Big DS came up with the name for the group, he named it after the black stone Onyx. They began to make the first demos in the basement of B-Wiz with drum machine beats from an SP-12.

== Career ==
In 1989, Onyx signed Jeffrey Harris as their manager, who helped them secure a contract with the label Profile Records. In 1990, at York Studio in Brooklyn, they recorded their first single, "Ah, And We Do It Like This", which was released to low sales on April 25, 1990, on Profile.

Big DS and Suave first met Jam Master Jay at Rev Run's wedding in 1990. They met again in a traffic jam at The Jones Beach GreekFest Festival on July 13, 1991. Jay gave them about two months to get a demo, but Suave and Big DS couldn't make it to the studio to record the demo. They were replaced on the demo by Fredro Starr's cousin, Sticky Fingaz, who at that time was pursuing a solo career under the name Trop. Fredro and Jones recorded two records for the demo, "Stik 'N' Muve" and "Exercise", which Jam Master Jay liked enough to sign the group to his label, JMJ Records.

Big DS left the group in 1994 to start a solo career. Big DS founded his own label Illyotic Music and started producing music. After recording a few demos, Big DS sent them to Jimmy Iovine, co-owner of Interscope Records, in the hope of signing a contract with his label for the release of the album.

== Death ==
On May 22, 2003, Big DS died in a hospital in Queens after receiving chemotherapy as a result of lymphatic cancer at 31 years old.

== Discography ==
With Onyx

- 1993: Bacdafucup

Solo albums

- 1994: Demo Tape

== Awards and nominations ==
Year	Award	Nominated work	Category	Result
1994	American Music Awards of 1994	"Bacdafucup"	Rap/Hip-Hop New Artist	Nominated
1994	1994 Soul Train Music Awards	"Bacdafucup"	Best Rap Album	Won

== Filmography ==
=== Video game appearances ===
- Rap Jam: Volume One (1995) as Big DS
