= Slam (Onyx song) =

1993 single by Onyx

Single by Onyx

from the album Bacdafucup
- B-side: "Da Nex Niguz"
- Released: May 11, 1993
- Recorded: 1992
- Studio: Soundtrack Studios, NYC
- Genre: East Coast hip hop · hardcore hip hop · comedy hip hop
- Length: 3:36
- Label: JMJ; RAL
- Songwriters: Fred Scruggs; Kirk Jones; Tyrone Taylor; Chylow Parker
- Producers: Chyskillz; Jam Master Jay

Onyx singles chronology
"Throw Ya Gunz" (1992)	"Slam" (1993)	"Shifftee" (1993)

Music video
- "Slam" on YouTube

Alternative cover
- Slam: The Alternatives

"Slam" is a song by American hip hop group Onyx. It was released on May 11, 1993, by JMJ Records and Rush Associated Labels as the second single from Onyx's debut album, Bacdafucup. The song introduced slamdancing into hip-hop.

"Slam" was Onyx's breakthrough single, making it to number 4 on the US Billboard Hot 100 and was the group's second straight single to make it to number 1 on the Hot Rap Singles for two weeks. The single was first certified Gold on July 7, 1993, before being certified Platinum on August 10, 1993. According to group member Fredro Starr, the song has sold about 5 million copies.

The song was sampled by more than 25 rap artists including GZA, Eminem, PMD, Shaquille O'Neal and Krazy Drayz of Das EFX. The song has been used in movies such as How High and television shows such as The Cleveland Show, The Tonight Show Starring Jimmy Fallon and Lip Sync Battle as well as numerous commercials, including Nike, ESPN, SoBe and Gatorade. The song was included in the soundtrack for the basketball video game NBA 2K18. It was also included in the baseball video game MLB The Show 21 and in Saints Row on the radio station The Cipher 99.5 FM.

In 2013, the song was re-recorded by Onyx, and released on a compilation album Urban Classics of the 80's 90's & 2000's.

== Recording ==
By the time the album was done, Jam Master Jay decided Onyx didn't have its hit single yet. He sent them back into the studio. "Slam" was the last song recorded for the album and was created in the studio in 7 days.

"...We needed to make a song that was just as aggressive, or more aggressive, but can play on the radio," says Sticky. "We spent the whole week in the studio, and that's how 'Slam' was created."

"...We needed something that we could kill them with, but dominate radio", recalls Sticky Fingaz. "That's when we made 'Slam', which was just as hard [as 'Throw Ya Gunz'], but more [radio-friendly], and it had a concept to it."

The song was created under the influence of the Nirvana's video for "Smells Like Teen Spirit". The melody was inspired by The Mohawks's song "The Champ". "Slam" introduced slamdancing into hip-hop, which previously could be seen in the crowd only at rock concerts.

"...We wanted to bring slam dancing to rap", says Fredro Starr. "Believe it or not, Nirvana was a big influence on us. Red Hot Chili Peppers too. When we was writing the album, [Nirvana's] 'Smells Like Teen Spirit' would come on all the time [on MTV] and they had slam dancing in that video. So that kind of triggered that. Run-DMC did the rock thing before, but nobody brought slam dancing until us. We took it to another level."

== Radio ==
As of May 28, 1993, "Slam" was played on 21 radio stations, including early requests at Hot 97.

Hip hop editor Dart Adams remembered the first appearance of the song on the radio and video rotation: "'Slam' aired on both MTV and BET, it was extremely radio friendly and it dropped right around the time of the 1993 NBA Playoffs. The NBA began playing it in arenas and even added it to their new promotional campaign. Next thing you knew, Onyx had their second number 1 Rap single that reached number 4 on the Billboard Hot 100 and earned them a Platinum plaque from the RIAA."

Funkmaster Flex was one of the first DJs who played "Slam" on his show Friday Night Street Jam on station Hot 97.

The song also played on The Stretch Armstrong & Bobbito Show before the single was officially released.

The single helped the group's debut album Bacdafucup go platinum in 1993.

== Music video ==
The music video was directed by Parris Mayhew, known in the past as guitarist and songwriter of Cro-Mags. Drew Stone's production company Stone Films NYC was a producer of this video. The video was filmed on Broadway Stages (Queens, NYC) and Compton, California in February 1993, and was premiered on The BOX on March 25, 1993. Russell Simmons, Run-DMC, Boss, Flatlinerz and Biohazard had a cameo appearance in the video. The music video begins with the band surrounded by a crowd that is jumping up and down. Onyx performs the song outside, in a warehouse, and as they crowd surf. The video showed slamdancing, moshing, crowd surfing. The video hit MTV right when the channel had also begun to play harder rap. Patti Galuzzi was MTV's director of music programming: "And we did play it in heavy rotation. It was something like number 13 in the top 100 of 1993, which is huge."

The music video was #1 on MTV's Most Wanted for 4 months and hit #1 on MTV's Weekly Countdown in 1993. As of 28 May 1993, the music video "Slam" was played on MTV 3 weeks in active rotation, was in top 10 requests and was #9 most played video. The video can be found on the 2008's DVD Onyx: 15 Years Of Videos, History And Violence and on the 2000s DVD And Ya Don't Stop: Hip Hop's Greatest Videos, Vol. 1.

== "Slam" (Bionyx remix) ==
Lyor Cohen came up with an idea to do a cover version of "Slam"; Onyx initially resisted the project, wanting to avoid selling out. An official remix entitled "Slam (Bionyx Remix)" was a collaboration with heavy metal band Biohazard. This rap rock version was released as a maxi-single entitled "Slam: The Alternatives" on June 22, 1993.

In May 1993, Parris Mayhew shot the third video for Onyx, for the song "Slam (Bionyx Remix)". Drew Stone's Stone Films NYC produced the video again. The video was filmed at The Academy, NYC. Redman, Danny Diablo, Madball, and 25 ta Life make appearances in the video. The video for the song "Slam (Bionyx Remix)" was used in an American animated sitcom Beavis and Butthead in the 1993 episode "Buff 'N' Stuff". This maxi single helped the main single "Slam" go platinum on August 10, 1993.

Onyx saved Def Jam thanks to the successfully sold singles "Slam" and "Slam: The Alternatives" and debut album Bacdafucup.

"...'Slam' was already platinum, then we did it with Biohazard, and it's double platinum.", says Sticky Fingaz. "We saved Def Jam, actually. We sold two million singles, and we sold two million albums."

== Performance on television ==
- The song was performed live by Onyx on Yo! MTV Raps "Live Fridays" in March, 1993.
- Onyx featured with "Slam" on the Fox's sketch comedy television series In Living Color on May 9, 1993.
- Onyx performed the song live on HBO's Rosie Perez presents Society's Ride aired on May 14, 1993.
- "Slam" was performed live by Onyx on a late-night talk show The Arsenio Hall Show aired on June 3, 1993.
- "Slam" was performed live by Onyx via Pay-Per-View Cable TV on Russell Simmons's Phat Jam at The Academy Theatre, NYC on June 18, 1993.
- Onyx performed the song live on a syndicated music television show It's Showtime at the Apollo aired on November 6, 1993.
- The song was performed live on an American music-dance television program Soul Train at stage 30 at the Paramount Studios aired on December 11, 1993.
- Onyx performed the song live on 1994 Soul Train Music Awards aired in national television syndication on March 15, 1994. At this ceremony the group won "Best Rap Album" for Bacdafucup.
- Onyx performed "Slam" live at VH1's Hip Hop Honors 2009 on September 23, 2009.
- The song was performed live by Onyx on the concert Yo! MTV Raps: 30th Anniversary Experience at Brooklyn's Barclays Center on June 1, 2018. MTV streamed live the concert on its website, Facebook, Twitter and YouTube.
- The song was performed live on a Russian late-night talk show Evening Urgant hosted by Ivan Urgant on Channel One on February 19, 2020.

== Appearances ==
=== Appearance on television ===
- In 1993, the video for the song "Slam (Bionyx Remix)" was used in an American animated sitcom Beavis and Butthead, episode Buff 'N' Stuff aired on MTV on October 14, 1993.
- In 1994, Toby Huss covering "Slam" as Frank Sinatra as part of a series of MTV bumpers MTV Keeps You Plugged In.
- In 1994, the song been used by Professional Wrestling tag team Public Enemy. Including in the event Hardcore Heaven during the fight between The Public Enemy (Rocco Rock and Johnny Grunge) and The Bad Breed (Axl Rotten and Ian Rotten).
- In 1995, "Slam" appeared on the MTV's show Superock.
- In 2007, Sebastian Bach covered this song on the eighth and final episode of MTV's new weekly competition show Celebrity Rap Superstar.
- In 2011, the song appeared in an American comedy clip show Ridiculousness, episode Biker Fox aired on MTV on November 14, 2011.
- In 2013, "Slam" was featured in an American adult animated sitcom The Cleveland Show, episode Mr. & Mrs. Brown
- In 2015, "Slam" was featured in an American police television sitcom Brooklyn Nine-Nine, episode Yippie Kayak.
- In 2016, "Slam" was featured in an American workplace comedy television sitcom Superstore, episode Secret Shopper.
- In 2016, Jimmy Fallon singing along to song "Slam" on The Tonight Show Starring Jimmy Fallon in the battle against the actor Seth Rogen in the category Lip Sync Battle.
- In 2016, Kevin Hart performed "Slam" on Spike TV's Lip Sync Battle vs. Olivia Munn.
- In 2016, "Slam" was played on TNT's TV show Танцы aired on December 17, 2016.

=== Appearance in movies ===
- In 2001, "Slam" was featured in the movie How High, but was not included in the official soundtrack.
- In 2013, "Slam" appeared in Capital Distruct, the movie by Seasons about skateboarding.
- In 2015, "Slam" was featured in an American comedy-drama Dope.
- In 2017, re-recorded version of "Slam" was included in the soundtrack for Cleopatra Entertainment's movie Devil's Domain.
- In 2017, "Slam" was featured in the comedy film Fist Fight.

=== Appearance in video games ===
- In 2010, "Slam" was included a rapping game Def Jam Rapstar.
- In 2012, "Slam" was included in a rhythm game NBA Baller Beats.
- In 2017, "Slam" was included in the soundtrack for a basketball simulation video game NBA 2K18.
- In 2021, "Slam” was included in the soundtrack and intro of MLB The Show 21.
- In 2022. "Slam” was featured in the video game Saints Row on the fictional radio station The Cipher 99.5 FM.

=== Appearance in a commercial ===
- In 2002, "Slam" was featured in the commercial SoBe.
- In 2006, the song appeared in Nike commercial starring Vince Carter.
- In 2011, the song was used as advertisement for ESPN's documentary The Fab 5 about the 1991 Michigan Wolverines men's basketball team "The Fab 5".
- In March 2014, the song played in the Gatorade Fierce commercial with NBA Star Paul George from Indiana Pacers.
- In 2023, the song appeared in a Progressive commercial where it was played over two people jumping in a bounce house, among other things.

== Accolades ==
In 1993, The Source described the song as a song that introduce slamdancing into hip-hop, saying "With this one, Onyx is set to introduce the art of slam dancing to the youth of Black America. Crashing Into each other and passing the mic back and forth, the hard heads attack the track's sparse bass and drum sounds with a frenzied level of energy that picks up right where “Gunz" Ieft off. The lyrics are hard and foul, and the shout-along chorus demands that "B-boys make noise." In 1993, The Face put the song in their list Recordings Of The Year 1993. In 1994, MTV placed the song's music video in their list MTV Top 100 Videos of 1993. In 1994, Spin placed the song in their list Top 5 Hip-Hop Chants Of '93. In 1999, Ego Trip's editors ranked the song in their list Hip Hop's 40 Greatest Singles by Year 1993 in Ego Trip's Book of Rap Lists. In 2005, Bruce Pollock put the song in his book The Rock Song Index: The 7500 Most Important Songs of the Rock and Roll Era, 1944-2000. In 2011, XXL placed the song in their list Top 250 Rap Songs of the '90s. In 2013, Complex put the song's music video in their list The 50 Best Rap Videos of the '90s. In 2013, Complex placed the song in their list 25 Rap Songs That Make Us Want To Punch Someone In the Face. In 2014, XXL listed the song in their list 40 Years of Hip-Hop: Top 5 Singles by Year. In 2014, the British newspaper The Guardian placed the song in their list Def Jam: 10 of the best. In 2015, Complex placed the song in their list The 100 Best New York City Rap Songs. In 2015, a free online men's web portal, AskMen put the song in their list 50 The Best 90s Summer Songs. In 2016, XXL placed the song in their list 20 of the Best Hip-Hop Workout Songs. In 2017, Complex placed Biohazard & Onyx "Slam (Bionyx Remix)" in their list The Best Rap-Rock Songs. In 2018, the music blog Riffs & Rhymes placed the song on its list 20 Badass Baseball Walk Up Songs. In 2019, LiveAbout.com put the song at number 13 on its list 25 Rap Songs to Get You Pumped Up. In 2020, LiveAbout.com placed the song at number 14 on its list of The 40 Best Hip-Hop Workout Songs.

Publication	Country	Accolade	Year	Rank
The Face	United Kingdom	Recordings Of The Year 1993	1993	6
The Guardian	United Kingdom	Def Jam: 10 of the best	2014	7
AskMen	United Kingdom	50 The Best 90s Summer Songs	2015	*
The Source	United States	Sure Shot Singles	1993	*
MTV	United States	MTV Top 100 Videos of 1993	1994	13
Spin	United States	Top 5 Hip-Hop Chants Of '93	1994	4
Ego Trip	United States	Hip Hop's 40 Greatest Singles by Year 1980-98	1999	16
Bruce Pollock	United States	The Rock Song Index: The 7500 Most Important Songs of the Rock and Roll Era, 1944-2000	2005	*
XXL	United States	Top 250 Rap Songs of the '90s	2011	64
Complex	United States	25 Rap Songs That Make Us Want To Punch Someone In the Face	2013	14
Complex	United States	The 50 Best Rap Videos of the '90s	2013	48
XXL	United States	40 Years of Hip-Hop: Top 5 Singles by Year	2014	*
Complex	United States	The 100 Best New York City Rap Songs	2015	64
XXL	United States	20 of the Best Hip-Hop Workout Songs	2016	1
Complex	United States	The Best Rap-Rock Songs	2017	*
Riffs & Rhymes	United States	20 Badass Baseball Walk Up Songs	2018	*
LiveAbout.com	United States	25 Rap Songs to Get You Pumped Up	2019	13
LiveAbout.com	United States	The 40 Best Hip-Hop Workout Songs	2020	14

== Track listing ==
=== A-Side ===
1. "Slam"- 3:36
2. "Slam" (Instrumental)- 3:36

=== B-Side ===
1. "Da Nex Niguz"- 4:05
2. "Da Nex Niguz" (Instrumental)- 4:05

=== Slam: The Alternatives ===
1. "Slam" (Bionyx remix) – 3:41
2. "Slam" (Industrial Strength Remix) – 3:35
3. "Slam" (LP Version) – 3:39
4. "Slam" (Nuclear Waste Industrial Mix) – 3:35
5. "Slam" (Glow In The Dark Frustration Mix) – 3:27
6. "Slam" (Funkymix) – 6:13

== Personnel ==
- Onyx – lead performer, vocals
- Fredro Starr – performer, vocals
- Sticky Fingaz – performer, vocals
- Suave – performer, vocals, congo
- Big DS – performer, vocals, backing vocals
- Jam Master Jay – producer
- Chyskillz – producer
- Kool Tee – producer
- Tony Dawsey – mastering
- Rich July – engineer
- Troy Hightower – engineer
- Norman Bullard – assistant engineer

== Charts ==
=== Weekly charts ===
Chart (1993)	Peak position
Germany (GfK)	41
New Zealand (Recorded Music NZ)	39
UK Singles (Official Charts)	31
US Billboard Hot 100	4
US Hot R&B/Hip-Hop Singles & Tracks (Billboard)	11
US Hot Rap Singles (Billboard)	1
US Hot Dance Music/Maxi-Singles Sales (Billboard)	1
US Rhythmic Top 40 (Billboard)	9
US R&B/Hip-Hop Airplay (Billboard)	21
US Radio Songs (Billboard)	23
US Top 30 Rap Singles (Cashbox)	1
US Top 100 R&B Singles (Cashbox)	13
US Top 100 Pop Singles (Cashbox)	5
US Gavin Rap Retail Singles (Gavin Report)	1
US Gavin Urban Singles (Gavin Report)	25

=== Year-end charts ===
Chart (1993)	Position
US Billboard Hot 100	37
US Hot Rap Singles (Billboard)	13
US Hot R&B/Hip-Hop Singles Sales (Billboard)	31
US Hot R&B Singles (Billboard)	59
US Hot 100 Singles (Billboard)	37
US Top 50 Pop Singles (Cashbox)	40

== Certifications ==
Region	Certification	Certified units/sales
United States (RIAA)	Platinum	1,000,000^{^}
^{^} Shipments figures based on certification alone.
