= Take a Ride =

1995 studio album by Jayo Felony

Studio album by Jayo Felony
- Released: October 24, 1995
- Recorded: 1994–1995
- Genre: West Coast hip hop; gangsta rap; G-funk
- Length: 44:57
- Label: JMJ; Def Jam
- Producer: Jam Master Jay (also exec.); Randy Allen (also exec.); Anthony "T-Funk" Pearyer; Marlin Wiggins; Nate Motley; Prodagee Productions; Jayo Felony

Jayo Felony chronology
Take a Ride (1995)	Whatcha Gonna Do? (1998)

Professional ratings
Review scores
Source	Rating
AllMusic	3/5 stars
The Source	3.5/5 stars

Take a Ride is the debut album by San Diego–based American rapper Jayo Felony. It was released on October 24, 1995, via Jam Master Jay's JMJ Records label and distributed by Rush Associated Labels, a PolyGram circulation of Def Jam Recordings. Audio production of the sixteen-track record was handled by Tony "T-Funk" Pearyer, Prodagee Productions, Marlin Wiggins, Randy Allen and Jam Master Jay, who also served as executive producers. The album peaked at number 65 on the Top R&B/Hip-Hop Albums chart.

== Track listing ==
No.	Title	Writer(s)	Producer(s)	Length
1.	"Lock Down"		Randy Allen	0:46
2.	"The Loc is on His Own"	J. Savage	Prodagee Productions	3:45
3.	"I'ma Keep Bangin'"	J. Savage; J. Mizell	Jam Master Jay; Marlin Wiggins	4:01
4.	"Homicide"	J. Savage	Marlin Wiggins; Nate Motley	3:39
5.	"Love Boat"		Randy Allen	1:05
6.	"Sherm Stick"	J. Savage; R. Allen; K. Gamble; L. Huff; J. Mizell	Jam Master Jay; Jayo Felony	3:13
7.	"Niggas and Bitches"	J. Savage; J. Mizell; A. Pearyer; W. Patterson	Jam Master Jay	4:01
8.	"Day 1"		Randy Allen; Tony "T-Funk" Pearyer	0:43
9.	"Can't Keep a Gee Down"	J. Savage	Nate Motley; Marlin Wiggins	3:34
10.	"Bitch I'm Through"	J. Savage; J. Mizell	Jam Master Jay	3:34
11.	"Penitentiary Bound"	J. Savage; J. Mizell; R. Allen; A. Pearyer	Jam Master Jay; Tony "T-Funk" Pearyer	3:29
12.	"Don't Call Me a Nigga"	J. Savage; R. Allen	Randy Allen	1:46
13.	"They Got Me on Medication"	J. Savage	Prodagee Productions	3:20
14.	"Funk 2 da Head"	J. Savage; J. Mizell; A. Pearyer	Jam Master Jay; Tony "T-Funk" Pearyer	3:33
15.	"Skit"		Randy Allen	0:14
16.	"Take a Ride"	J. Savage; A. Pearyer; J. Mizell	Jam Master Jay; Tony "T-Funk" Pearyer	4:14
Total length:				44:57

Notes

- Track 2 contains samples from "T.A.P.O.A.F.O.M. (Fly Away)" by George Clinton and P-Funk All Stars (1996)
- Track 6 contains samples from "Come Go With Me" by Teddy Pendergrass (1979)

== Personnel ==
- Aaron Reiss - mixing & recording (track 6)
- Anthony Cox - guitar (track 10), mixing & recording (tracks: 7, 10, 14, 16)
- Anthony "T-Funk" Pearyer - backing vocals & keyboards (track 10), producer (tracks: 7–8, 11, 14, 16)
- James Savage - main artist, producer (track 6)
- Jason William Mizell - executive producer, producer (tracks: 3, 6–7, 10–11, 14, 16)
- Kenneth "Bull" Davis - backing vocals (track 6)
- Kevin Goins - backing vocals (track 7)
- Marlin Wiggins - producer (tracks: 3–4, 9)
- Nate Motlety - producer (tracks: 4, 9), mixing (tracks: 2–4, 9, 13)
- Randy Allen - executive producer, producer (tracks: 1, 5, 8, 12, 15)
- Robert Ulsh - recording (tracks: 2–4, 9, 13)
- Tamika Dash - backing vocals (track 16)
- Tim Clark - mixing (tracks: 2–3, 9, 13)
- Tony Dawsey - mastering
- Victor "Wyse" Sturdivant - drums (track 7)
