= Bebe's Kids (video game) =

1994 video game

- Cover art
- Developer: Radical Entertainment
- Publishers: Paramount Interactive; Motown Games; Mandingo Entertainment
- Producer: David E. Davis
- Programmer: Jack Rebbetoy
- Artists: Ian Verchere; Arthur We
- Composer: Paul Wilkinson
- Platform: Super NES
- Release: NA: April 1994
- Genre: Beat 'em up action
- Mode: Single-player

Bebe's Kids is a side-scrolling beat 'em up video game developed by Radical Entertainment and published by Motown Games/Paramount Interactive for the Super Nintendo Entertainment System, released in 1994. It is based on the 1992 animated film of the same name and, like the film, received largely unfavorable critical reception.

== Gameplay ==
The player fighting against two mascots.

The player controls either LaShawn or Kahlil as they wreak havoc in Fun World, the Disneyland-like theme park featured in the film. Similar to both Konami's The Simpsons and Kaneko's B. Rap Boys, the player must contend with security guards, disgruntled mascots, and pirates who work for the theme park. Other stages include a haunted house, a pirate ship, and the pits. Both characters have unique special attacks.

== Reception ==
Nintendo Power gave the game a very negative review. While noting that it had "nice graphics and sound", the magazine criticized its "extremely slow action", stating enemies "take huge amounts of damage so battles seem endless", as well as its "poor play control." In 1997, Nintendo Power ranked it the worst video game of all time.

Time Extension also listed Bebe's Kids as one of the worst SNES games.
