= Rap Jam: Volume One =

1995 video game

- Cover art
- Developer: 64WD Creation
- Publishers: Motown Games; Mandingo Entertainment
- Designer: Pascal Jarry
- Programmer: Pascal Jarry
- Composer: Michel Winogradoff
- Platform: Super NES
- Release: NA: January 1995
- Genre: Sports
- Modes: Single-player; Multiplayer

Rap Jam: Volume One is a basketball video game for the Super Nintendo Entertainment System, developed by American studio 64WD Creation, in which the players are rap and hip-hop artists. The game is played on an urban basketball court, with fisticuffs and no foul calls. There is an exhibition mode and a tournament mode.

The game was released in January 1995. Despite the Volume One moniker, this was the only installment released. It is also the second and final game to be developed by Motown Software.

== Characters ==
- Coolio
- House of Pain (Everlast, Danny Boy, & DJ Lethal)
- LL Cool J
- Naughty by Nature (Treach, Vin Rock, & Kay Gee)
- Onyx (Sticky Fingaz, Fredro Starr, Big DS, & Suave)
- Public Enemy (Flavor Flav, Chuck D, & Terminator X)
- Queen Latifah
- Warren G
- Yo-Yo

== Reception ==
In 1997 Electronic Gaming Monthly ranked it number 9 on their "Top 10 Worst Games of All Time". Electronic Gaming Monthly's Seanbaby placed it as number 14 in his "20 worst games of all time" feature.
