= Whatcha Gonna Do? (Jayo Felony album) =

Studio album by Jayo Felony
- Released: August 25, 1998
- Recorded: 1997–1998
- Studio: Blackhole Studios, (Hawthorne, CA); Encore Studios, (Burbank, CA); Suave House Studios, (Houston, TX)
- Genre: West Coast hip hop; gangsta rap; G-funk
- Length: 1:05:47
- Label: Def Jam
- Producer: Tina Davis (exec.); Jayo Felony (also exec.); DJ Silk; CMT; E-A-Ski; Anthony "T-Funk" Pearyer; T-Mix

Jayo Felony chronology
Take a Ride (1994)	Whatcha Gonna Do? (1998)	Underground (1999)

Professional ratings
Review scores
Source	Rating
AllMusic	3/5 stars
Rap Pages	4/5 stars
The Source	3.5/5 stars

Whatcha Gonna Do? is the second studio album by San Diego–based American rapper Jayo Felony. It was released on August 25, 1998, via Def Jam Records. The eighteen-track record features guest appearances from DMX, E-40, Kokane, 8Ball & MJG, Method Man & Redman, and Westside Connection.

The album was a critical and commercial success, making it to number 46 on the Billboard 200 and number 8 on the Top R&B/Hip-Hop Albums chart. Its self-titled DJ Silk-produced hit single "What'cha Gonna Do?" with Method Man and DMX was included in Hav Plenty soundtrack and peaked at number 45 on the R&B/Hip-Hop Airplay. An E-A-Ski-produced single "Nitty Gritty" peaked at number 1 on the Bubbling Under R&B/Hip-Hop Songs chart.

== Track listing ==
No.	Title	Writer(s)	Producer(s)	Length
1.	"Intro" (Skit)	R. Brown; J. Savage	DJ Silk	2:19
2.	"Nobody on Dry Land"	J. Savage; A. Pearyer	Tony "T-Funk" Pearyer	3:06
3.	"How Angry" (featuring 8Ball & MJG)	P. Smith; J. Savage	T-Mix	3:40
4.	"Whatcha Gonna Do?" (featuring Method Man & DMX)	R. Brown; J. Savage; E. Simmons; C. Smith	DJ Silk	4:34
5.	"Easy to Get In"	J. Savage; R. Brown; M. Morales; D. Robinson; L. Michael Smith; K. Walker	Jayo Felony; DJ Silk; Blu (co.)	3:39
6.	"Whatcha Gonna Do (Remix)" (featuring Mack 10, Redman & WC)	R. Brown; R. Noble; D. Rolison; J. Savage	DJ Silk	4:30
7.	"Nitty Gritty"	S. Adams; J. Savage	CMT; E-A-Ski	4:10
8.	"I'm Deadly"	S. Adams; J. Savage	E-A-Ski; CMT	4:21
9.	"On the Way to 47 Block" (Skit)	R. Brown; J. Savage	DJ Silk	1:06
10.	"Gettin' Loop Loop" (Skit)	R. Brown; J. Savage	DJ Silk	1:05
11.	"Lovely"	A. Pearyer; J. Savage	Tony "T-Funk" Pearyer	4:35
12.	"Bumpin' Bullet Loco"	J. Savage	Jayo Felony	4:19
13.	"Love Don't Love" (featuring Kokane)	R. Brown; J. Savage	DJ Silk	4:33
14.	"Finna Shit on 'Em" (featuring Mack 10)	S. Adams; D. Rolison; J. Savage	CMT; E-A-Ski	3:59
15.	"Hustle Into My Genes"	S. Adams; J. Savage	E-A-Ski; CMT	4:39
16.	"End of the World"	J. Savage	Jayo Felony	4:18
17.	"J.A.Y.O. (Justice Against Y'all Oppressors)" (featuring Ice Cube & E-40)	O. Jackson; A. Pearyer; E. Stevens; J. Savage	Tony "T-Funk" Pearyer	4:38
18.	"Outro" (Skit)	R. Brown; J. Savage	DJ Silk	2:16
Total length:				1:05:47

Notes

- Track 3 contains samples from "Unhooked Generation" by Freda Payne (1970)
- Track 4 contains samples from "Heartbreaker (Part I, Part II)" (1983) and "More Bounce to the Ounce" (1980) by Zapp
- Track 5 contains samples from "Jail House Rap" by The Fat Boys (1984)
- Track 7 contains samples from "Five Minutes of Funk" by Whodini (1984)
- Track 11 contains samples from "Mystery" by Anita Baker (1986)
- Track 15 contains samples from "Just Don't Bite It" by N.W.A (1990)

== Personnel ==
- Anthony "T-Funk" Pearyer – producer (tracks: 2, 11, 17)
- Chris Gehrigner – mastering
- Clifford Smith – guest artist (track 4)
- Dedrick D'Mon Rolison – guest artist (tracks: 6, 14)
- Earl Simmons – guest artist (track 4)
- Earl Stevens – guest artist (track 17)
- Greg Royal – mixing
- James Savage – main artist, executive producer, producer (tracks: 5, 12, 16)
- Jerry B. Long Jr. – guest artist (track 13)
- Kenny McCloud – engineer
- Mark Ogleton – producer (tracks: 7–8, 14–15)
- Marlon Jermaine Goodwin – guest artist (track 3)
- O'Shea Jackson – guest artist (track 17)
- Premro Smith – guest artist (track 3)
- Reggie Noble – guest artist (track 6)
- Russell Brown – producer (tracks: 1, 4–6, 9–10, 13, 18)
- Shon Adams – producer (tracks: 7–8, 14–15)
- Tina Davis – executive producer
- Triston Jones – producer (track 3)
- William Loshawn Calhoun Jr. – guest artist (track 6)

== Charts ==
Album

Chart (1998)	Peak position
Billboard 200	46
Billboard Top R&B/Hip-Hop Albums	8

Singles

Year	Song	Chart positions	
Year	Song	R&B/Hip-Hop Airplay	Bubbling Under R&B/Hip-Hop Songs
1998	"Whatcha Gonna Do?" (feat. DMX and Method Man)	#45	-
1998	"Nitty Gritty"	-	#1
