= Ghetto Millionaire =

Studio album by Royal Flush
- Released: August 19, 1997
- Recorded: 1996–1997
- Genre: Hip hop
- Label: TVT
- Producer: Prince Kaysaan, Buckwild, EZ Elpee, Da Beatminerz, Sha-Self, Hi-Tek, L.E.S., Chyskillz

Royal Flush chronology
Ghetto Millionaire (1997)	Street Boss (2005)

Singles from Ghetto Millionaire
- 1. "Worldwide" Released: 1996; 2. "Iced Down Medallions" Released: 1997

Professional ratings
Review scores
Source	Rating
AllMusic	2.5/5 stars
RapReviews	6/10
The Source	3.5/5 stars

Ghetto Millionaire is the debut album by American rapper Royal Flush, released on August 19, 1997, through TVT Records. The album featured various contributors, including prominent hip-hop producers Da Beatminerz, L.E.S., Buckwild and Hi-Tek.

The album reached No. 48 on the Top R&B/Hip-Hop Albums chart and No. 30 on the Top Heatseekers chart in Billboard magazine. The album spawned two charting singles, "Worldwide" and "Iced Down Medallions", which reached No. 41 and 18 on the Rap Singles chart respectively. "Iced Down Medallions" peaked at No. 63 on the Hot R&B/Hip-Hop Songs chart.

== Track listing ==
All tracks are written by Royal Flush.

No.	Title	Producer	Length
1.	"Intro"	Prince Kaysaan	1:05
2.	"I Been Getting So Much $"	Buckwild	4:04
3.	"Iced Down Medallions" (featuring Noreaga)	EZ Elpee	3:29
4.	"Can't Help It" (featuring Khadejia)	Prince Kaysaan	3:15
5.	"Illiodic Shines" (featuring Mic Geronimo)	Prince Kaysaan	4:06
6.	"Movin' on Your Weak Productions" (featuring Phenom Pacino)	Da Beatminerz	3:59
7.	"Conflict Intro"		0:20
8.	"Conflict" (featuring Wastlanz)	Sha-Self	3:44
9.	"Shines Intro"		0:35
10.	"Shines"	Hi-Tek	3:18
11.	"Family Problems"	EZ Elpee	2:35
12.	"What a Shame" (featuring Noreaga)	EZ Elpee	4:14
13.	"Regulate Intro"		0:48
14.	"Regulate" (featuring Mic Geronimo)	EZ Elpee	3:16
15.	"Worldwide"	L.E.S.	3:10
16.	"Niggas Night Out" (featuring Ja Rule)	Buckwild	2:50
17.	"International Currency Intro"		0:42
18.	"International Currency" (featuring Wastlanz)	Chyskillz	4:10
19.	"War"	Royal Flush	3:18
20.	"Makin' Moves" (featuring Mic Geronimo)	Buckwild	3:31
21.	"Reppin'" (featuring Michelle Mitchell)	L.E.S	4:01
22.	"Dead Letter"	Low	4:01

== Charts ==
Chart (1997)	Peak position
US Top R&B/Hip-Hop Albums (Billboard)	48
US Heatseekers Albums (Billboard)	30
