= Motown Software =

American video game publisher

- Final logo of Motown Software
- Industry: Service
- Founded: 1994
- Defunct: 1996
- Fate: Defunct
- Headquarters: United States
- Area served: North America
- Products: Video games

Motown Software (also known as Motown Games) was an American video game publisher company that was a spinoff from the Motown record label.

They were responsible for publishing African American-oriented video games during the 1990s. Only two games were released from this development company and both received negative criticism.

== Video games ==
=== Super NES ===
- Bebe's Kids (1994)
- Rap Jam: Volume One (1995)
