= Royal Flush (rapper) =

American rapper

- Born: Ramel T. Govantes; May 12, 1975 (age 51)
- Origin: Queens, New York City U.S.
- Genres: East Coast hip hop
- Years active: 1994–present
- Label: TVT Records

Royal Flush (born Ramel T. Govantes on May 12, 1975) is an American East Coast rapper from Flushing, Queens, New York. He is a friend of Mic Geronimo and appeared on many songs with him. His 1997 debut album, Ghetto Millionaire, featured production from Buckwild, L.E.S., Da Beatminerz and some verses from Noreaga in various songs, and received critical acclaim. His second album Street Boss was released in 2005, to mixed reviews. Since 2017 he has been a regular cast member of the NYC based FM radio program The Ryan Show. In 2023 he dropped the album "The Royal Price Show" featuring Sean Price, Grafh, Little Vic and Nature.

== Discography ==
=== Albums ===
- Ghetto Millionaire (1997)
- Street Boss (2005)
- Grand Capo (2014)
- The Governor (2019)
- The Sit Down (2023)
- The Royal Price Show (2023)
- Royal Terms (2026)

=== Appearances ===
- 1995: 8 songs from the Mic Geronimo album The Natural
- 2002: "Caught Up"; "I Wanna Fuck" from The Trials and Tribulations of Russell Jones
- 2003: "Flamboyant 2" from the Big L album Harlem's Finest - A Freestyle History
- 2005: "If Y'all Want War" from the Ol' Dirty Bastard album Osirus
- 2006: "Double Up" featuring Big L and Kool G Rap
- 2007: "Bullseye" from the NYG'z album Welcome 2 G-Dom
- 2007: "Cut That Weak Shit (Remix)" from the Buckwild album Buckwild: Diggin' in the Crates
- 2008: "Questions" from the Pete Rock album NY's Finest
- 2009: "Everybody Raps (featuring Mic Geronimo)" from the album Mass Movementz:The Album
- 2009: "Rotten Apple (Spoiled Mix)" from the Tokimonsta mix tape "Attention Deficit"
- 2016: "Queens" from the N.O.R.E. album Drunk Uncle
- 2018: "Good Lobster" from the Sean Price album Metal Detectors
- 2022: "Never Be" from the Kool G Rap album Last of a Dying Breed
- 2024: "Codes" from the Diamond D album Diam Piece 3: Initium
