= Bridges (Sonny Seeza album) =

Studio album by Sonny Seeza
- Released: February 26, 2016
- Recorded: 2011–2015
- Studios: PW Records (Basel, Switzerland)
- Genre: Hardcore hip hop
- Length: 47:09
- Label: Empire Music
- Producers: DJ Tray, Jakebeatz, DJ Rad, DJ Def Cut, Dr. G, Ay-Cut, DJ Idem, San Fermin

Sonny Seeza chronology
| Tytanium (2009) | Bridges (2016) |

Singles from Bridges
- 1. "Everywhere" Released: January 29, 2016

Bridges is the second solo studio album by American rapper Sonny Seeza, an original member of multi-platinum hardcore rap group Onyx. The album was released digitally on February 26, 2016. The album was produced by DJ Tray, Jakebeatz, DJ Rad, DJ Def Cut, Dr. G, Ay-Cut, DJ Idem, San Fermin. It is his first album in 7 years, his last effort being 2009's Tytanium.

== Background ==
In 2011 Sonny Seeza was flown to Switzerland by Som Keomanyvong from Loyal Unity Booking and Management, to do several live show performances around Switzerland. Later she became his booking agent, manager, and beloved wife. Then she introduced him to Matt, who was interested in doing an album project with Sonny Seeza through his label, Empire Music. Inspired by the new relationship, Sonsee start working on a second solo album "Bridges" at the studio PW Records in Basel, which was released on February 26, 2016.

== Singles ==
"Everywhere" was released as the album's single on January 29, 2016. The music video for this single was released on March 14, 2016.

== Track listing ==
| No. | Title | Writer(s) | Producer(s) | Length |
|---|---|---|---|---|
| 1. | "Intro" | Tyrone "Sonny Seeza" Taylor | | 0:35 |
| 2. | "Artvendor Skit" | Tyrone "Sonny Seeza" Taylor | | 0:23 |
| 3. | "Artwork" | Tyrone "Sonny Seeza" Taylor | DJ Tray | 3:40 |
| 4. | "Rrraaoww" | Tyrone "Sonny Seeza" Taylor | Jakebeatz | 2:38 |
| 5. | "Allskool" | Tyrone "Sonny Seeza" Taylor | Jakebeatz | 3:19 |
| 6. | "All Around Money Skit" | Tyrone "Sonny Seeza" Taylor | | 0:14 |
| 7. | "Bridges" (featuring Greg Valentine (All City), Trubbs, Grave Digger (The Flatlinerz) & Dyrect Disciple) | Tyrone "Sonny Seeza" Taylor, Greg Valentine, Trubbs, Grave Digger & Dyrect Disciple | DJ Tray | 5:33 |
| 8. | "B.Ass" | Tyrone "Sonny Seeza" Taylor | DJ Rad | 3:08 |
| 9. | "Everywhere" | Tyrone "Sonny Seeza" Taylor | DJ Def Cut | 3:24 |
| 10. | "Doc Help Remix" | Tyrone "Sonny Seeza" Taylor | Dr. G | 2:57 |
| 11. | "Macrospace" | Tyrone "Sonny Seeza" Taylor | Ay-Cut | 4:10 |
| 12. | "Life" | Tyrone "Sonny Seeza" Taylor | Jakebeatz | 4:20 |
| 13. | "Our Lights" | Tyrone "Sonny Seeza" Taylor | DJ Def Cut | 3:34 |
| 14. | "Fight" | Tyrone "Sonny Seeza" Taylor | Jakebeatz | 4:09 |
| 15. | "Mama's Crying" (featuring Ali Starr) | Tyrone "Sonny Seeza" Taylor | DJ Idem | 3:15 |
| 16. | "Outro" | Tyrone "Sonny Seeza" Taylor | San Fermin | 1:50 |
| Total length: | | | | 47:09 |
