= Tytanium =

Studio album by Sonny Seeza
- Released: May 19, 2009
- Recorded: 1998–2009
- Genre: Hardcore hip hop
- Length: 70:13
- Label: Iceman Music Group E1
- Producers: The Alchemist, Agallah and others

Sonny Seeza chronology
Cold Case Files (2008)	Tytanium (2009)	Bridges (2016)

Tytanium is the debut solo studio album by American rapper Sonny Seeza, an original member of multi-platinum hardcore rap group Onyx. The album was released on May 19, 2009, through Iceman Music Group and distributed by E1 Distribution. The album was produced by The Alchemist, Agallah and others. The album features appearances by rappers Steven King, Agallah, Greg Valentine, Tracy "Sunshiine" Woodall, Killah Priest, Tae G, and Cybil.

== Track listing ==
1. "Sonny Seeza Intro" - 0:17
2. "Romp" - 4:36
3. "Question #3 (Skit)" - 0:08
4. "It's Hot Down Here" (feat. Steven King) - 2:57
5. "Tonight" (feat. Greg Valentine) - 1:51
6. "In Here I Am (SuperHeroSonny's Theme)" - 3:24
7. "Dat Muzik" - 2:30
8. "Find Out" - 2:38
9. "Highway of Life" (feat. Agallah, Greg Valentine & Sunshine W) - 3:02
10. "Reelin 'Em In" - 2:15
11. "Lot's of Faith (The Recipe)" (feat. Killah Priest) - 3:04
12. "Gravy" (feat. Agallah) - 3:01
13. "See More Gains Intro" - 0:17
14. "We Got Next" (feat. Steven King) - 2:45
15. "Where You At?" (feat. Tae G & Cybil) (1998) - 3:43
16. "OvaAchievas" - 2:18
17. "Ohh!" - 2:42
18. "SharkZindaTANK" (feat. Steven King) - 1:49
19. "CerealWarZ" - 3:49
20. "Brooklyn" (feat. Agallah) - 3:57
21. "Automatics" (feat. Steven King) - 3:21
22. "Fire (S.I.T.G.) (Interlude)" (1998) - 1:27
23. "Blow Up (Excerpt)" - 0:27
24. "Ha! Ha!" - 3:55
25. "Let's Just (Interlude)" - 1:08
26. "Drunk & High" - 2:52
27. "Find Out (Outro)" - 0:39
28. "Hidden Track": CerealWarZ (Full Version) - 5:06

== Samples ==
The track "CerealWarZ" uses dialogue from a popular 70s commercial for the breakfast cereal "Life". In the ad two brothers refuse to try the new cereal, and offer it to their younger brother Mikey. To their surprise, Mikey eagerly eats it. The commercials feature the catchphrase "He likes it! Hey Mikey!"
