= DJ Jam Master J'Son =

American musician, music producer, and DJ

- Also known as: JMJSon
- Born: April 14, 1986 (age 40); New York City, U.S.
- Origin: Atlanta, Georgia, U.S.
- Genres: Hip hop; EDM; house; R&B; pop; Latin; rock; country
- Occupation: Disc Jockey
- Instruments: Turntables; vocals
- Years active: 2009-present
- Website: http://www.jmjson.com/

Jason William Mizell Jr. (born April 14, 1986), better known by his stage name DJ Jam Master J'Son, is an American musician, music producer, and Disc Jockey (DJ). He is the oldest son of deceased Run DMC DJ Jam Master Jay. He is currently the official DJ of his father's hip hop group Run–D.M.C.

== Early life ==
Mizell Jr. was born in New York City, New York. He and his family relocated to the Atlanta metropolitan area in the years following the murder of his father in 2002. Mizell Jr. graduated from Norcross High School. He attended Middle Georgia State University.

== Career ==
DJ Jam Master J'Son began his career in entertainment DJing in local nightclubs in the town he attended college. Originally he went by the name DJ E.Z. Bread, but an acquaintance convinced him to switch his professional name to DJ Jam Master J'Son. The name pays homage to his shared professional and birth name with his legendary father. In 2011, DJ Jam Master J'Son went on his first international tour with American hip hop artist Mann and Virgin Islands-born singer Iyaz. The tour included stops in Lebanon, Great Britain, France, Australia, Sri Lanka, and South Korea.

In 2012, DJ Jam Master J'Son and his younger brother T.J. Mizell made their debuts as the official DJs of Run–D.M.C at the Budweiser Made in America Festival. DJ Jam Master J'Son and T.J. Mizell were greeted by an ecstatic Beyonce after their historic performance in place of their late father. It was Run–D.M.C's first performance together in over ten years. DJ Jam Master J'Son continues to tour with Run–D.M.C as their official DJ. In 2015, DJ Jam Master J'Son performed with Iyaz as a part of the Bangkok Music Festival in Bangkok, Thailand.

== Filmography ==
DJ Jam Master J'Son performed live on PBS with Naughty by Nature as a part of the Grammy Salute to the Legends series. They performed a Run–D.M.C medley.

== Personal life ==
DJ Jam Master J'Son currently resides in Atlanta, Georgia.
