= JMJ Records =

American record label

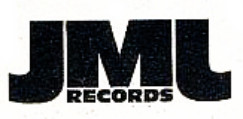
- Parent company: Rush Associated Labels
- Founded: 1985; 41 years ago
- Founder: Jason Mizell
- Defunct: 2002
- Status: Defunct
- Distributors: Sony Music, PolyGram
- Genre: Hip hop, new jack swing, R&B, rap rock
- Country of origin: United States
- Location: New York City, New York, U.S.

JMJ Records was an American record label which was founded in 1985 by Jason Mizell, better known as Jam Master Jay from Run-D.M.C. The label was relaunched in 2017 by Jam Master J'Son, the oldest son of Jam Master Jay. The label released such artists as The Afros, Fam-Lee, Onyx, Jayo Felony, Suga and 50 Cent. The label closed in 2002 after the murder of its founder. Throughout the duration of its existence, JMJ Records has released 6 studio albums and about 25 singles.

== History ==
JMJ Records was founded in 1985 by Jason Mizell, better known as Jam Master Jay from Run-D.M.C. The label was distributed by Sony Music and PolyGram. The label folded in 2002 after the murder of its founder in his own recording studio 24/7 Studios, in Jamaica, Queens on October 30, 2002.

The first label artist was The Afros, which consisted of Kool Tee (Tadone Hill), DJ Kippy-O (Kip Morgan) and Beastie Boys' DJ Hurricane (Wendell Fite). The group name stands for "A Funky Rhythmic Organization Of Sounds". Their single "Feel It" was the first single released on the label in 1990. The group's debut and only album, Kickin' Afrolistics, was released on JMJ Records on August 14, 1990. All music on the album was produced by David Reeves, better known as Davy DMX, and Jason Mizell. The material for the second album was recorded, but it was never released. The group also took a part in the recording of the song "Pause" by Run-D.M.C, which was originally released on the "Ghostbusters" single in 1989.

In 1991, Jay signed Fam-Lee, which included four brothers by the name of: Berkley, Anthony, Keef and Coree Pearyer from Plainfield, New Jersey. Their late uncle, Glen Goins, was a member of the Bootsy's Rubber Band and P-Funk. In 1991, four singles were released, which included videos: "You're The One For Me", "Love Me", "Always On My Mind" and "Runs In The Fam-Lee". The single "Runs In The Fam-Lee" also features a remix that was produced by the producer of Onyx, Chyskillz. In 1992, Fam-Lee released on JMJ Records their debut album Runs In The Fam-Lee. The group recorded songs in the popular at that time new jack swing style and performed songs mainly about love. Jam Master Jay produced almost all of their songs.

In 1993, JMJ Records scored a success with Onyx, whose debut album Bacdafucup went Platinum in the same year, thanks to their popular single "Slam", which became a hip hop anthem, and also awarded Platinum in the same year.

In 1994, Jay signed gangsta rapper Jayo Felony from San Diego, California. The result of this deal was the debut album Take a Ride, released in 1995.

In 1995, JMJ signed female rapper Suga (a.k.a. Sweet Tee), whose single, "What's Up Star?", was included on the soundtrack for The Show.

In 1996, Jay took under his wing a young Curtis Jackson, whom he allowed to use the professional equipment in a recording studio and gave him the first real opportunities for performances in front of an audience. In 1997, Jackson released on JMJ Records debut single "The Glow / The Hit" under the name Fifty-Cent. In 1998, Fifty took a part in the recording of the song "React" for the third album of Onyx, Shut 'Em Down. Jay produced debut album for Fifty Cent, which he had planned to release under JMJ. However, after a frustrating writing process and several production delays, the album was postponed and never saw the light of day. To date, there are very few remnants of 50 Cent's early work with Jam Master Jay. However, Jay's mentorship helped Fifty get the close attention of several executive producers from Columbia Records, who appreciated his talent and signed to their label in 1999.

In 2017, JMJ Records was re-opened by Jam Master Jay's son, Jason Mizell Jr., also known as Jam Master J'Son & partner Richy718.

== Former artists ==
- The Afros
- Fam-Lee
- Onyx
- Jayo Felony
- Suga
- 50 Cent
- Char Elizabeth aka Charlene Cockett

== Discography ==
=== Albums ===
- 1990: The Afros - Kickin' Afrolistics
- 1992: Fam-Lee – Runs In The Fam-Lee
- 1993: Onyx – Bacdafucup
- 1995: Jayo Felony – Take a Ride
- 1995: Onyx – All We Got Iz Us
- 1998: Onyx – Shut 'Em Down

=== Singles ===
- 1990: The Afros - "Feel It"
- 1991: Fam-Lee – "Always On My Mind"
- 1991: Fam-Lee – "Runs In The Fam-Lee"
- 1991: Fam-Lee – "Love Me"
- 1992: Fam-Lee – "You're The One For Me"
- 1992: Onyx – "Throw Ya Gunz"
- 1993: Onyx – "Bacdafucup / Throw Ya Gunz"
- 1993: Onyx – "Slam"
- 1993: Onyx – "Slam - The Alternatives"
- 1993: Onyx – "Shifftee"
- 1993: Onyx – "Da Nex Niguz / Da Nex DingDong"
- 1994: Jayo Felony – "Niggas And Bitches"
- 1995: Jayo Felony – "Sherm Stick / Homicide"
- 1995: Jayo Felony – "I'ma Keep Bangin' / Livin' Foe Dem 4 Thangs"
- 1995: Suga – "Breakin' MC"
- 1995: Suga – "What's Up Star?"
- 1995: Onyx – "Live!!! / Walk In New York"
- 1995: Onyx – "Last Dayz"
- 1995: Onyx – "Evil Streets (Remix) / Purse Snatchers Pt. 2"
- 1995: Onyx – "Shout (Remix) / Most Def"
- 1995: Onyx / Kali Ranks – "Live!!! / Kill Dem All"
- 1997: Fifty-Cent – "The Glow / The Hit"
- 1997: Cream Team – "The Knock"
- 1998: Onyx – "Shut 'Em Down"
- 1998: Onyx – "React"
- 1998: Onyx – "Broke Willies / Ghetto Starz"
