= 1994 Soul Train Music Awards =

Music awards ceremony in Los Angeles, US

Soul Train Music Awards
- Date: March 15, 1994
- Location: Shrine Auditorium, Los Angeles, California
- Country: United States
- Hosted by: Gladys Knight, Patti LaBelle and Johnny Gill
- First award: 1987

Highlights
- Most awards: Toni Braxton and Whitney Houston (2)
- Website: soultrain.com

Television/radio coverage
- Network: WGN America

The 1994 Soul Train Music Awards were held on Tuesday, March 15, 1994, at the Shrine Auditorium in Los Angeles, California. The show was hosted by Patti LaBelle, Gladys Knight and Johnny Gill.

== Special awards ==
=== Heritage Award for Career Achievement ===
- Barry White

=== Sammy Davis Jr. Award for Entertainer of the Year ===
- Whitney Houston

== Winners and nominees ==
Winners are in bold text.

=== R&B Album of the Year – Male ===
- **Babyface – For the Cool in You**
  - Tevin Campbell – I'm Ready
  - Prince – The Hits/The B-Sides
  - Luther Vandross – Never Let Me Go

=== R&B Album of the Year – Female ===
- **Toni Braxton – Toni Braxton**
  - Mariah Carey – Music Box
  - Janet Jackson – janet.
  - Tina Turner – What's Love Got to Do with It

=== R&B Album of the Year – Group, Band or Duo ===
- **Silk – Lose Control**
  - Earth, Wind & Fire – Millennium
  - Intro – Intro
  - Tony! Toni! Toné! – Sons of Soul

=== Best R&B Single – Male ===
- **Tevin Campbell – "Can We Talk"**
  - Babyface – "Never Keeping Secrets"
  - Johnny Gill – "The Floor"
  - Luther Vandross – "Heaven Knows"

=== Best R&B Single – Female ===
- **Toni Braxton – "Breathe Again"**
  - Oleta Adams – "I Just Had to Hear Your Voice"
  - Whitney Houston – "I Have Nothing
  - Janet Jackson – "That's the Way Love Goes"

=== Best R&B Single – Group, Band or Duo ===
- **Jodeci – "Lately"**
  - H-Town – "Knockin' Da Boots
  - Tony! Toni! Toné! – "Anniversary"
  - Vanessa Williams and Brian McKnight – "Love Is"

=== R&B/Soul Song of the Year ===
- **Whitney Houston – "I Will Always Love You"**
  - Toni Braxton – "Breathe Again"
  - Janet Jackson – "That's the Way Love Goes"
  - Tony! Toni! Toné! – "Anniversary"

=== Best R&B Music Video ===
- **Janet Jackson – "If"**
  - Arrested Development – "Mr. Wendal"
  - Toni Braxton – "Breathe Again"
  - Dr. Dre – "Nuthin' but a 'G' Thang"

=== Best R&B New Artist ===
- **H-Town – "Knockin' Da Boots"**
  - Angie & Debbie – "Light of Love"
  - Tag Team – "Whoomp! (There It Is)"
  - Xscape – "Just Kickin' It"

=== Best Rap Album ===
- **Onyx – Bacdafucup**
  - Arrested Development – Unplugged
  - Digable Planets – Reachin' (A New Refutation of Time and Space)
  - Naughty by Nature – 19 Naughty III

=== Best Gospel Album ===
- **Mississippi Mass Choir – It Remains to Be Seen**
  - Shirley Caesar – Stand Still
  - Kirk Franklin & the Family – Kirk Franklin and the Family
  - The Winans – All Out

=== Best Jazz Album ===
- **Kenny G – Breathless**
  - George Benson – Love Remembers
  - Terence Blanchard – The Malcolm X Jazz Suite
  - Fourplay – Between the Sheets

== Performers ==
- Whitney Houston – "Queen of the Night" / "I'm Every Woman"
- Onyx – "Slam"
- Digable Planets – "Rebirth of Slick (Cool Like Dat)"
- Babyface – "Never Keeping Secrets"
- Toni Braxton – "Another Sad Love Song"
- Johnny Gill – "Quiet Time to Play"
- Barry White Tribute:
  - Johnny Gill – "It's Ecstasy When You Lay Down Next to Me"
  - Patti LaBelle – "I've Got So Much to Give"
  - Gladys Knight – "Can't Get Enough of Your Love, Babe"
- The Winans – "That Extra Mile"
- Snoop Doggy Dogg, Dr. Dre and Jewell – "Nuthin' but a 'G' Thang" / "Who Am I? (What's My Name?)"
- Bobby Brown and Whitney Houston – "Something in Common"

== Presenters ==
- Rosie Perez, Naughty By Nature and T.K. Carter - Presented Best R&B/Soul Single - Group, Band or Duo
- Paul Rodriguez, Tony! Toni! Toné! and Mary J. Blige - Presented Best R&B/Soul or Rap New Artist
- Karyn Parsons, Ralph Tresvant and Ricca - Presented Best R&B/Soul or Rap Music Video
- Lisa Lisa, Jamie Foxx and Silk - Presented Best Jazz Album
- George Wallace, Jade and Kristoff St. John - Presented Best Gospel Album
- Terry McMillan - Presented Sammy Davis Jr. Award for Entertainer of the Year
- Sheryl Lee Ralph, Xscape and Kirk Franklin - Presented Best R&B/Soul Single - Male
- Earth, Wind and Fire and Angie & Debbie - Presented Best R&B/Soul Single - Female
- Bill Bellamy, Jodeci and Oleta Adams - Presented Best Rap Album
- Magic Johnson - Presented Heritage Award for Career Achievement
- Tevin Campbell, Intro and T'Keyah Crystal Keymáh - Presented R&B/Soul or Rap Song of the Year
- Charles S. Dutton, Kenya Moore and Terrence Blanchard - Presented Best R&B/Soul Album - Group, Band or Duo
- Sinbad, Brian McKnight and Zhané - Presented Best R&B/Soul Album - Male
- TLC and Don Franklin - Presented Best R&B/Soul Album - Female
