= Check the Technique =

2007 book by Brian Coleman

Check the Technique: Liner Notes for Hip-Hop Junkies
- Author: Brian Coleman
- Cover artist: Dreu Pennington-McNeil
- Language: English
- Subject: Hip hop music
- Genre: Non-fiction
- Publisher: Villard/Random House
- Publication date: 2007
- Publication place: United States
- Pages: 528 pp
- ISBN: 978-0812977752
- OCLC: 76961265
- Dewey Decimal: 782.42164909 22
- LC Class: ML3531 .C65 2007

Check the Technique: Liner Notes for Hip-Hop Junkies is a book by music journalist Brian Coleman that covers the making of 36 classic hip hop albums, based on interviews with the artists who created them, also providing a track-by-track breakdown for each album entirely in the words of the artists. It was published by Villard/Random House in 2007.

It is an expanded and updated version of the book Rakim Told Me, also by Brian Coleman, and it features a foreword by Questlove of the Roots.

== Reception ==
The book received positive reviews from numerous press outlets, such as Entertainment Weekly, AllHipHop, ALARM Magazine, and The Onion/The A.V. Club.

Some criticisms of the book are that it is missing certain classic albums, is missing some tracks from some albums, that it has very few female artists covered, and "little attention is given to the outlining societal conditions."

Brian Coleman explained in interviews that he did not intentionally leave any album out of the book, but there were difficulties in arranging interviews with certain artists. He also commented he wanted to focus on hip hop artists and what they had to say, rather than on academic subjects surrounding hip hop: "I don't really wanna read what critics have to say about the stuff. I wanna read what the artist has to say." He added,

I've never really been interested as much in the sociological, sociopolitical, academic view of hip hop and where it exists in popular culture. I like the music and I want to know about it. I think the artists are sick of that. That is why, I think, [in these interviews] they kind of really settle into the groove and really start getting into it. Like Erick Sermon—when I was talking to him, [it was] like he was talking about somebody else. I mean, how many people ask Too Short about how he records instead of asking about the more sensational parts of his personality? My goal was to get to the core of it. I think it proves that not enough people have really talked to these artists. To actually give them the respect they deserve as musicians, I think they appreciate that. They certainly open up accordingly.

This approach has been praised by critics—URB commented on his "mercifully non-academic approach", and ALARM Magazine said,

The best part about Coleman taking on the job is that he does it so well. Where others might want to intellectualize the stories of an urban artist's rise from obscurity to legendary status, in Coleman's hands these tales are anything but academic.

== Sequel ==
Check the Technique Vol. 2: More Liner Notes for Hip-Hop Junkies was published in 2014.

== Notes ==
- Coleman, Brian (2007). Check the Technique: Liner Notes for Hip-Hop Junkies. New York: Villard/Random House, ISBN 978-0812977752.
