= Sonny Seeza =

American rapper (born 1970)

- Also known as: Suavé; Sun-C; Sonsee
- Born: Tyrone Taylor; November 13, 1970 (age 55)
- Origin: Brooklyn, New York City, U.S.
- Genres: East Coast hip-hop; hardcore hip-hop
- Occupations: Rapper; record producer; DJ; actor; designer
- Years active: 1982–present
- Labels: JMJ; Def Jam; Tytaynium Onyx; Empire Music
- Formerly of: Onyx
- Website: www.AllSkoolShop.com

Tyrone Taylor (born November 13, 1970), better known by his stage name Sonny Seeza, or previously as Suavé and Sonsee, is an American rapper, record producer, DJ and actor best known as a member of multi-platinum hardcore rap group Onyx.

Suave was discovered by Jam Master Jay of Run-D.M.C., who signed Onyx on his label JMJ Records. Onyx went on to release three top-selling albums and two commercially unsuccessful, before Sonny Seeza began his solo career. As a solo artist, Seeza released two albums, Tytanium and Bridges, and took part in recording various projects of other rap artists.

As a part of Onyx, Sonny Seeza released 5 albums and 20 singles, was nominated as "Rap/Hip-Hop New Artist" on American Music Awards of 1994 and won "Best Rap Album" on 1994 Soul Train Music Awards. During his career, Sonny Seeza has sold over 15 million albums and starred in two movies The Addiction and Ride.

== Career ==
=== DJing ===
In 1982, Tyrone Taylor began in Brooklyn as a member of his older brother's hip-hop group, Cold Crash Scenes, performing with Killah Priest. Soon he began practicing DJing and would later find the experience useful while recording the Onyx's second album All We Got Iz Us. Sonsee moved from Brooklyn to John Adams High School in 1985 and first met Fredro Starr and Big DS at the battle in Ajax Park (now called "Dr. Charles R. Drew Park") in Queens.

=== Onyx ===
In 1988, after graduating from school at the age of 17, Fredro Starr created the rap group Onyx along with his schoolmates Big DS and Suavé. Big DS came up with the name for the group, he named it after the black stone Onyx. Early demos from the group were created in the basement of B-Wiz with drum machine beats from an SP-12.

"...B-Wiz was my producer when I was fifteen and sixteen, even. When all the other kids was getting turntables, he had an SP-12 [sampler]. He was one of the first niggas in the hood with a beat machine."

In 1989, Onyx signed Jeffrey Harris as their manager, who helped them secure a contract with the label Profile Records. In 1990, at York Studio in Brooklyn, they recorded their first single, "Ah, And We Do It Like This", which was released to low sales on April 25, 1990, on Profile.

"... That very first record was produced by a producer named B-Wiz. B-Wiz was the first producer of that record. He produced “Ah, And We Do It Like This,” and a lot of the original shit in like ’89, ’87, and ’88 for Onyx."

=== Jam Master Jay ===
Suave, Fredro Starr and Big DS met Jam Master Jay in a traffic jam at The Jones Beach GreekFest Festival on July 13, 1991. Jay provided two months for the group to make a demo album, but Suave and Big DS could not travel to the studio from Connecticut. The group's manager, Jeffrey Harris, requested that Fredro come to the studio with his cousin, Kirk Jones (Sticky Fingaz) who, at the time, had a solo career under the name Trop. Jones, who was still in high school, would allegedly cut class to work at a barber shop where he was reportedly making a thousand dollars a week. Fredro and Sticky Fingaz made two records, "Stik 'N' Muve" and "Exercise".

"...When we went to the studio we made two records. One was called 'Stick and Move' and the other was called 'Exercise'. And they both were crazy! When Jay heard the songs he was like, 'Yo, I love the group'."

Sticky Fingaz would join Onyx as a full-time member after Jam Master Jay stated, “If Sticky ain't in the group, it ain't no group!”. Jay signed the group to his label, JMJ Records, for a single deal, followed by an EP deal. An album deal was later signed, due, in part, to the fact that the group managed to create 10 songs on a 6-song budget.

=== Def Jam years ===
In 1993, Onyx released their debut album entitled Bacdafucup. It proved to be a commercial success and eventually went multi-platinum, largely due to the well known single "Slam". Then Onyx released on JMJ Records another two albums: All We Got Iz Us and Shut 'Em Down.

=== Contribution ===
Tyrone Taylor came up with a merged spelling of the words "Bacdafucup", which the group members chose to name their debut album. The phrase "United States Ghetto" or shorty "U.S.G." was made up by him. Suave is the designer of one of the very first logos of the Onyx group, used by group in 1992. Sonny Seeza also created the names "Sticky Fingaz" and "Mickey Billy" for the characters of Kirk Jones and Fredro Starr for the song "Stik 'N' Muve".

=== Solo career ===
Sonny Seeza stopped touring with Onyx in 2009 to begin a solo career, but he still performs with other members of the group on big shows. He no longer participates in recording new songs with Onyx.

In 2011 Sonny Seeza was booked to travel to Switzerland through Loyal Booking Inc., a booking agent to do several live show performances in Switzerland. Sonny then was introduced to Mattieu Siegenthaler in Switzerland By Soni K, a loyal booking show promoter. Mattieu was interested in doing an album project with Sonny Seeza through his startup label Imprint, Empire Music. The first project he released on the new label Empire Music was a compilation CD The Billboard Blackmarket Mixtape. In 2012, Seeza founded his label Tytaynium Onyx. He released his second solo album Bridges on February 26, 2016.

== Discography ==
=== Studio albums ===
- Tytanium (2009)
- Bridges (2016)

=== Compilation albums ===
- The Billboard Blackmarket Mixtape (2012)

=== Singles ===
- "Fire" / "Where You At" (as Sonsee from Onyx) (1998)
- "Doc Help" (2012)
- "We Can Due It" (2014)
- "Everywhere" (2016)

== Awards and nominations ==
Year	Award	Nominated work	Category	Result
1994	American Music Awards of 1994	"BACDAFUCUP"	Rap/Hip-Hop New Artist	Nominated
1994	1994 Soul Train Music Awards	"BACDAFUCUP"	Best Rap Album	Won

== Filmography ==
=== Film ===
- The Addiction (1995) cameo appearance
- Ride (1998) as Tyrone "Son See" Taylor

== Syndication ==
=== Video games ===
- Rap Jam: Volume One (1995) as Suave
