= Record labels owned by Sony BMG =

This is a list of record labels owned by Sony BMG Music Entertainment.

== Columbia Records ==
- Aware Records
- Burgundy Records
- Chaos Recordings
- C2 Records
- LBW Entertainment
- Loud Records

== Epic Records ==
- Caribou Records
- Daylight Records
- 550 Music
- Ruthless Records
- WTG Records
- The Work Group

== Legacy Recordings ==
- Windham Hill Records
- Private Music

== RCA Music Group ==
- RCA Records
- Arista Records
- J Records
- Full Surface Records
- US Records
- Polo Grounds Music
- Bluebird Records
- Phonogenic Records

== Provident Music Group ==
- Brentwood Records
- Benson Records
- Essential Records
- Flicker Records
- Beach Street Records
- Reunion Records
- Praise Hymn Music Group
- Provident Special Markets
- Provident-Integrity Distribution

== RED Distribution ==
- Cashville Records
- Red Ink Records

== Sony BMG Nashville ==
- Open Wide
- Arista Nashville
- BNA Records
- RCA Nashville
- Columbia Nashville

== Sony BMG Masterworks ==
- Masterworks Broadway Records
- Playbill Records
- RCA Victor Red Seal Records
- Sony Classical
- Sony Broadway
- Odyssey Records
- Arte Nova Classics
- Deutsche Harmonia Mundi

== Zomba Music Group ==
- Battery Records
- Epidemic Records
- La Face Records
- Jive Records
- Music for Nations Records
- Pinnacle Records
- Scotti Brothers Records
- Silvertone Records
- Verity Records
- Volcano Records/Zoo Records
- X-Cell Records

== BMG Japan ==
- TriStar Music

== Independent labels distributed by Sony BMG ==
- Almost Gold Recordings
- BNM Records
- Century Music Malaysia
- Dancing Cat Records (through Windham Hill)
- GOOD Music
- Gun Records
- Deutsche Harmonia Mundi
- Independiente Records
- Nick Records
- NotNowMum! Records
- One Records
- Platinum Star Records
- Rukus Avenue
- Shout! Factory
- Skint Records
- Thrive Records
- Thugtertainment
- Wind-up Records

== See also ==
- List of Sony Music Entertainment labels
