= Jam Master Jay =

American hip hop musician (1965–2002)

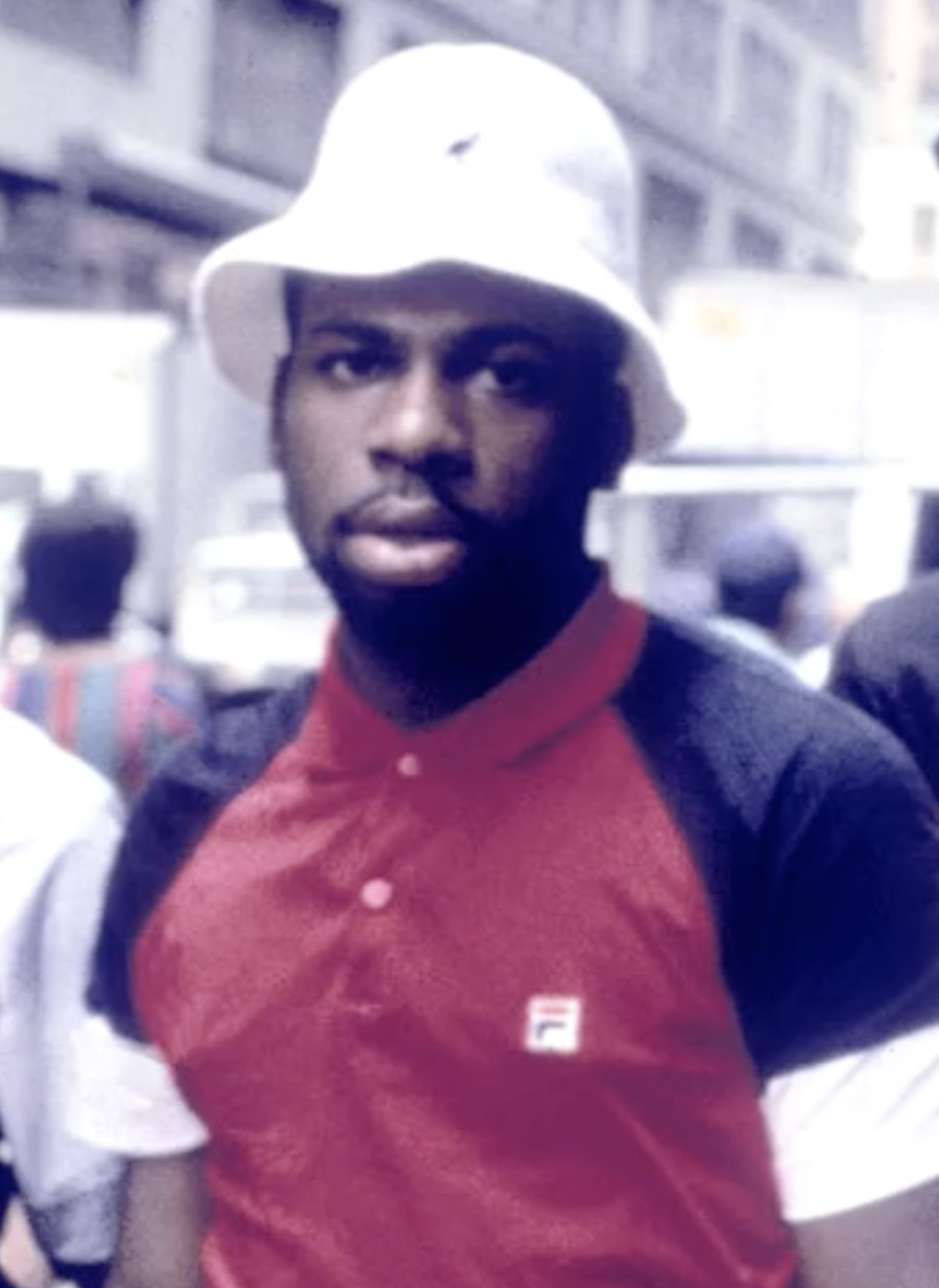
- Jam Master Jay in 1985

Background information
- Also known as: DJ Jazzy Jase; Jam Master Funk
- Born: Jason William Mizell; January 21, 1965; New York City, U.S.
- Died: October 30, 2002 (aged 37) New York City, U.S.
- Cause of death: Murder (gunshot)
- Genres: Hip-hop; golden age hip-hop; rap rock
- Occupations: Disc jockey; record producer; musician
- Instruments: Vocals; turntables
- Years active: 1983–2002
- Labels: JMJ; Profile
- Formerly of: Run-DMC
- Website: jasonmizell.com

Jason William Mizell (January 21, 1965 – October 30, 2002), better known by his stage name Jam Master Jay, was an American musician, record producer and DJ. He was the DJ of the influential hip hop group Run-DMC. During the 1980s, Run-DMC became one of the biggest hip hop groups, credited with breaking hip hop into mainstream music. Mizell was inducted posthumously into the Rock and Roll Hall of Fame as a member of Run-DMC in 2009.

Mizell was murdered in his Queens recording studio in 2002 and his case was left unsolved until February 2024, when Ronald Washington and his godson Karl Jordan Jr., were convicted for the 2002 drug-related murder, with a third man, Jay Bryant, pleading guilty in 2026 to participating in the murder.

== Early life ==
Jason Mizell was born in Brooklyn, a borough of New York City. the son of Jesse Mizell and Connie Thompson Mizell (later Connie Mizell-Perry).

At age three, Jason began playing trumpet. He learned to play bass, guitar, and drums. He performed at his church and in various bands prior to discovering turntablism. After he and his family moved to Hollis, Queens, New York City, in 1975 at the age of 10, he discovered the turntables and started DJing at the age of 13. He was high school friends with Wendell "DJ Hurricane" Fite, known for his 13-year collaboration with Beastie Boys.

As a teenager, Mizell was involved with a group that committed residential burglaries. An encounter with an armed security guard frightened him into stopping the burglaries, and as an adult he was known for discouraging criminal activities among his friends and family.

For a time, he lived in Atlantic City, New Jersey, where turntablism pioneer DJ Def Lou Hauck taught him to crossfade. He caught on quickly because of his musical experience and after a year of DJing he felt that he was good enough to play in front of people. Originally calling himself Jazzy Jase, he attended high school at Andrew Jackson High School in New York City's Queens.

== Career ==
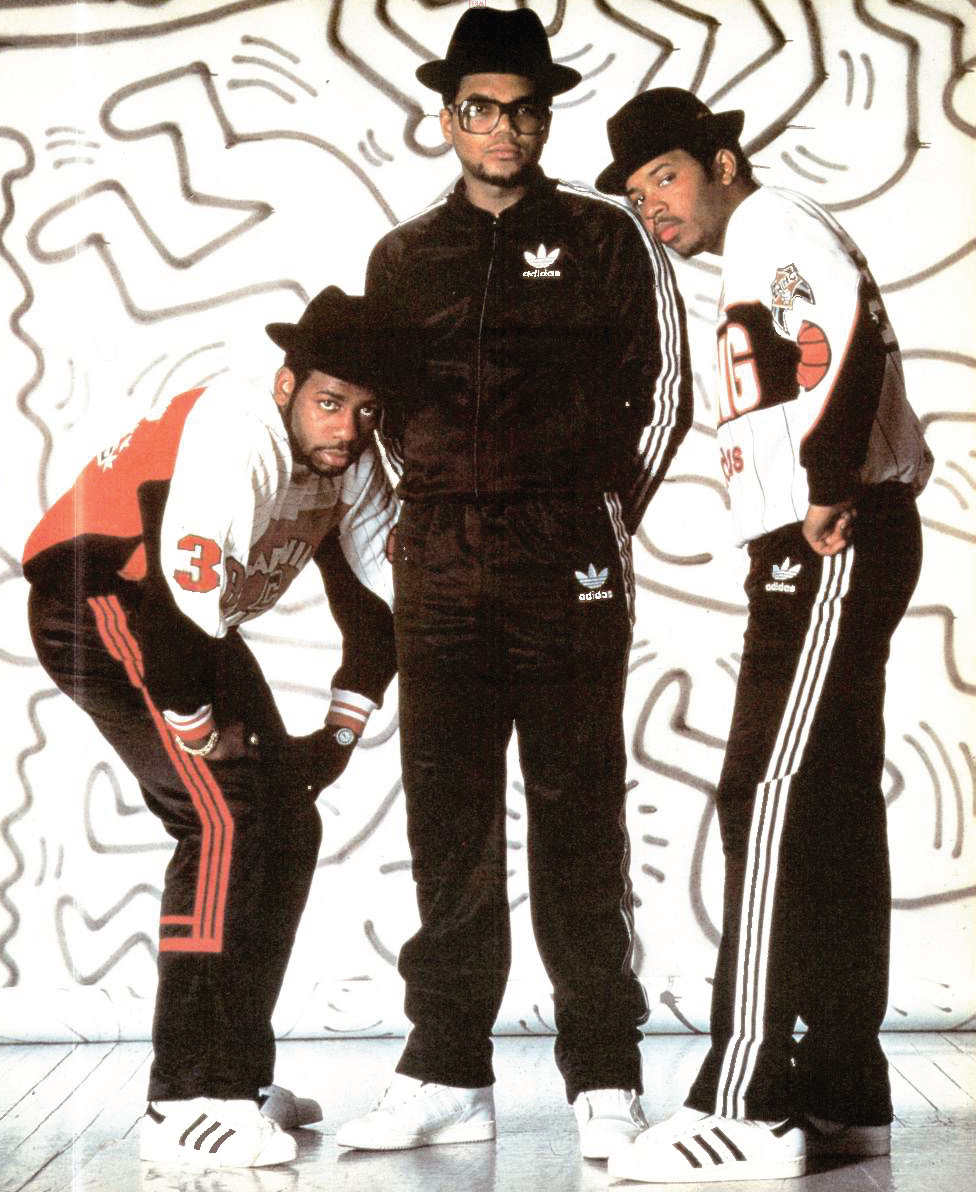
Mizell (left) as a member of Run-DMC in 1986

He first started playing at parks and later played at bars. He also began throwing small parties around the area. Once he got a pair of Technics 1200s, he improved rapidly, since he was able to practice at night with headphones on when he was supposed to be sleeping.

Mizell became a DJ because he "just wanted to be a part of the band". Prior to joining Run-D.M.C., he played bass and drums in several garage bands. In 1982, he joined Joseph "Run" Simmons and Darryl "D.M.C." McDaniels just after they graduated from high school and agreed to DJ for them. On Run-D.M.C's album Raising Hell, Mizell played keyboards, bass, and live drums in addition to his turntable work. Mizell remained in his childhood neighborhood in Hollis, Queens his entire life.

Despite not being considered to the general public as prominent to Run-DMC as Simmons and McDaniels were, with his public role being Run DMC's DJ and less notable musician, Mizell's role with the rap trio would in fact become more prominent behind the scenes. Mizell was in fact very vital to Run-DMC, as he would give the group their street credential image and would even be considered the Run-DMC member who was most responsible for expanding the worldwide audience of the hip hop genre, as he developed the sound of most Run-DMC songs. In 2012, The Guardian described Mizell as having "created almost every sound that Run and DMC would rap over."

In 1989, Mizell established JMJ Records. The label is most known for signing 50 Cent and Onyx. Jam Master Jay Records folded after Jason Mizell was murdered on October 30, 2002.

Mizell's legacy includes the Scratch DJ Academy in Manhattan. Founded in 2002, the year of his death, the academy was created to "provide unparalleled education and access to the art form of the DJ and producer."

== Personal life ==
Jam Master Jay was related to the Mizell Brothers, a popular production team for Gary Bartz, Johnny "Hammond" Smith, and others.

On consecutive Christmas holidays, Mizell survived a car accident and a gunshot wound to the leg, respectively. The car accident occurred in the early morning hours of December 26, 1987, in the West Village of Manhattan.

Jam Master Jay was the father of three sons: Jason Mizell Jr. (who performs as DJ Jam Master J'Son), Jesse Mizell, and TJ Mizell (also a DJ), and a daughter, Tyra Myricks (born August 1992).

Though he and other Run DMC members were known for promoting anti-drug messages, including appearing in an anti-drug public service announcement, holding anti-drug shows, and even on their 1987 song "It's Tricky", prosecutors in his murder case alleged Mizell later got involved in dealing high-kilo cocaine in 1996. However, despite revelations of getting involved in drug dealing, Mizell's family still maintained that he did not use drugs.

== Murder ==
Murder of Jam Master Jay
- Location: 40.706917°N 73.795139°W; New York City, U.S.
- Date: October 30, 2002; 24 years ago 7:30 p.m. (EST)
- Target: Jason William Mizell, a.k.a. Jam Master Jay
- Attack type: Murder by shooting
- Deaths: 1 (Jason William Mizell, a.k.a. Jam Master Jay)
- Injuries: 1 (Urieco Rincon)
- Perpetrators: Karl Jordan Jr. (shooter); Ronald Washington; Jay Bryant
- Motive: Allegedly a drug dispute
- Verdict: Jordan and Washington: Guilty on all counts Jordan granted acquittal on appeal, but still remains in prison for separate charges Bryant: Pled guilty to federal firearm related murder charge
- Convictions: Murder while engaged in narcotics trafficking (Jordan and Washington); Firearm-related murder (all three defendants)

On Wednesday, October 30, 2002 at 7:30 pm, Mizell was fatally shot in New York City in his recording studio on Merrick Boulevard in Jamaica, Queens. Another person in the room, 25-year-old Uriel Rincon, was shot in the ankle and survived. Following Mizell's death, several artists expressed their grief for the loss in the hip hop community and remembered him for his influence on music and the genre. A funeral service was held at Allen Cathedral. Mizell was buried at Ferncliff Cemetery and Mausoleum in Hartsdale, New York.

In 2003, Kenneth McGriff, a convicted drug dealer and longtime friend of Murder Inc. Records founders Irving "Irv Gotti" Lorenzo and his older brother Christopher, was investigated for targeting Mizell. The alleged reason was Mizell's defiance of an industry blacklist of rapper 50 Cent, imposed because of "Ghetto Qu'ran", a song 50 Cent wrote about McGriff's drug history.

In December 2003, Playboy magazine published an article by investigative journalist Frank Owen, "The Last Days of Jam Master Jay", which traced the murder to a drug deal gone bad. Owen said he uncovered evidence that Mizell, not normally involved in crime as an adult, had turned to cocaine distribution to pay mounting bills. Mizell owed substantial debts to the Internal Revenue Service, among others, after his music career stalled in the late 1990s. According to Owen, several sources indicated Mizell traveled to Washington, D.C. on July 31, 2002 to obtain 10 kilograms (22 lb) of cocaine valued at about a quarter-million dollars from a trafficker known as "Uncle". Mizell reportedly agreed to pay for the drugs in about a week. However, Mizell failed to repay Uncle, who allegedly arranged to have Mizell murdered. In 2023, Owens claimed the broad outlines of the case and culprits were well-known in the Queens community and he was able to learn critical details in only a few weeks of interviews. However, the criminal case stalled due to a combination of the no snitching ethos and a botched, heavy-handed investigation by the New York Police Department which led to witnesses refusing to cooperate. Owens also notes how the case was reopened and progressed only when U.S. Federal investigators got involved due to interstate elements of the crime, and more carefully cultivated relationships with witnesses.

In April 2007, federal prosecutors named Ronald Washington as an accomplice in the murder. Washington also is a suspect in the 1995 murder of Randy "Stretch" Walker, a former close associate of rapper Tupac Shakur, who was also murdered. According to court papers filed by the prosecution, Washington "pointed his gun at those present in the studio, ordered them to get on the ground and provided cover for his associate to shoot and kill Jason Mizell".

In 2018, Netflix released a documentary analyzing the circumstances of his murder. ReMastered: Who Killed Jam Master Jay?, the third episode of Netflix's ReMastered music documentary series, interviews several of Mizell's friends, family members and acquaintances who share stories they have heard regarding suspects in his murder. The documentary does not come to a conclusion about who killed Mizell. Also in 2018, former prosecutor Marcia Clark featured Jam Master Jay's murder in an episode of her series Marcia Clark Investigates The First 48 on A&E where she examined several scenarios and suspects for the murder. She spoke to former Run DMC road manager Darren "Big D" Jordan, who denied allegations of involvement made against him by Ronald Washington. Clark further interviewed Owen, who stood by his 2003 article as largely accurate and stated he did not know who shot Mizell but believed the murder was facilitated by Mizell's close friend Ronald Washington.

Both Washington and his accomplice Karl Jordan Jr. are believed to have entered the recording studio while armed with handguns. Jordan Jr. is believed to have been the one who fired the fatal shot into Mizell's head. A third man, Jay Bryant, was accused of unlocking the fire escape from which Washington and Jordan Jr. entered the studio.

=== 2020 arrests and trial ===
In 2020, Ronald Washington and Karl Jordan Jr. were indicted for Mizell's murder. The indictment alleged that Mizell had recently acquired 10 kilograms (22 lb) of cocaine from a distributor based in Maryland. Mizell, Washington, and Jordan had an agreement to sell the cocaine on consignment but Mizell cut the two men out after a dealer objected to Washington's participation. Prosecutors asserted that Jordan Jr. admitted to the crime in a conversation. Washington had been considered a suspect very early in the investigation, and Jordan had been charged in August 2003 with attempted murder after shooting Mizell's nephew, Rodney Jones, in the leg.

Washington and Jordan Jr. pleaded not guilty. In November 2021, it was announced federal prosecutors would seek life imprisonment without the possibility of parole rather than the death penalty. In October 2022, the trial was scheduled to begin on February 20, 2023. In February 2023, the trial was rescheduled to begin in November 2023 after a key witness died. However, after Jay Bryant was also charged in May 2023, the trial was rescheduled to January 2024. Jury selection for Washington and Jordan Jr.'s trial began on January 22, 2024. The trial itself began on January 29, 2024, with Jordan Jr. and Washington entering not guilty pleas and the jury hearing opening statements.

On February 27, 2024, Washington and Jordan were convicted on charges of murder while engaged in a narcotics trafficking conspiracy and firearm-related murder.

On December 19, 2025, it was announced Jordan's conviction would be overturned by U.S. District Judge LaShann DeArcy Hall. The judge sided with defense argument there was insufficient evidence to prove a central prosecution claim that Jordan had a motive that was drug-related. When overturning Jordan's conviction, Hall also granted Jordan an acquittal and, conditionally, denied a request for a retrial. However, Hall upheld Washington's conviction and denied his retrial request. Despite overturning Jordan's murder conviction, Hall ordered Jordan to remain in prison due to an upcoming trial on separate drug charges. Jordan remained in prison as of April 2026, with his attorneys arguing he should be released on bond or ankle monitor system while prosecutors believed he should remain incarcerated pending new trial.

=== 2023 charges and 2026 guilty plea ===
On May 30, 2023, federal prosecutors representing the Eastern District of New York charged a third suspect, Jay Bryant, for Mizell's murder. Bryant was already in custody for drug-related charges. In October 2023, it was ruled that Bryant would get a separate trial from Mizell's other two accused murderers, Ronald Washington and Karl Jordan Jr. with his trial at this point in time scheduled to begin in January 2026.

On April 27, 2026, Jay Bryant became the first suspect to publicly admit to orchestrating the murder, saying he "helped them kill" Mizell. Bryant had also claimed he was the shooter, though prosecutors still considered Jordan Jr. to be the killer. During this time, Bryant would plead guilty in the U.S. Eastern District of New York federal court in Brooklyn to a federal firearm related murder charge which carries a mandatory minimum of 15 years in prison and a maximum of 20 years in prison.
