= Slick Rick discography =

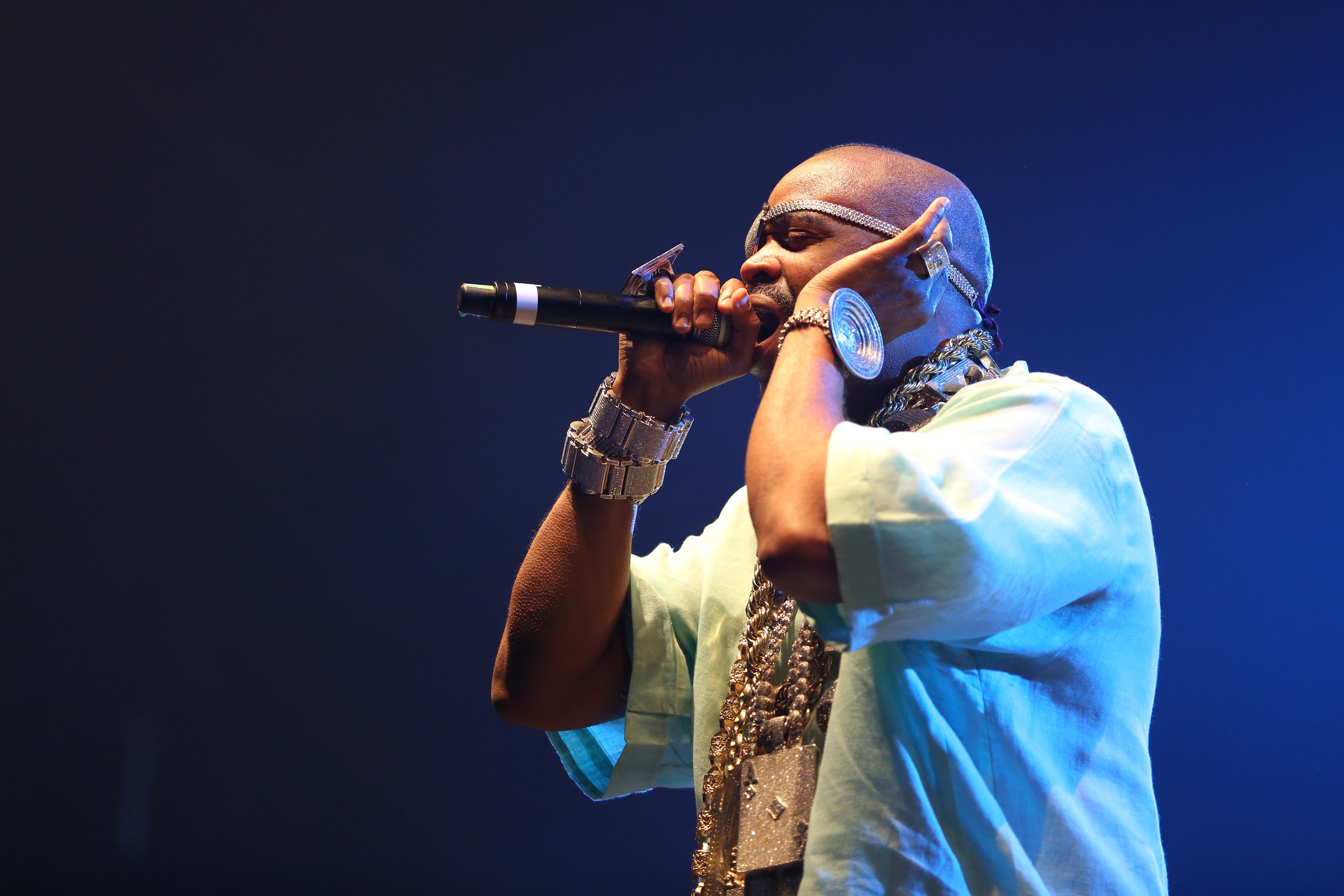
- Slick Rick performing in July 2016
- Studio albums: 5
- Singles: 17

This is the discography for English-American hip hop musician Slick Rick. It includes 5 studio albums and 17 singles, including 8 as a featured artist.

== Albums ==
=== Studio albums ===
List of studio albums, with selected chart positions and certifications
Title	Album details	Peak chart positions			Certifications
Title	Album details	UK R&B	US	US R&B /HH	Certifications
The Great Adventures of Slick Rick	Released: November 3, 1988; Label: Def Jam; Format: CD, LP, cassette, digital download, streaming	—	31	1	RIAA: Platinum
The Ruler's Back	Released: July 2, 1991; Label: Def Jam; Format: CD, LP, cassette, digital download, streaming	—	29	18	
Behind Bars	Released: November 22, 1994; Label: Def Jam; Format: CD, LP, cassette, digital download, streaming	—	51	11	
The Art of Storytelling	Released: May 25, 1999; Label: Def Jam; Format: CD, LP, cassette, digital download, streaming	10	8	1	RIAA: Gold
Victory	Released: June 13, 2025; Label: Mass Appeal, 7Wallace; Format: CD, digital download, streaming	—	—	—	
"—" denotes a recording that did not chart or was not released in that territory.

== Singles ==
=== As lead artist ===
List of singles, with selected chart positions
Title	Year	Peak chart positions							Certifications	Album
Title	Year	UK	UK Dance	UK R&B	US	US Dance	US R&B	US Rap	Certifications	Album
"Teenage Love"	1988	—	—	—	—	—	16	8		The Great Adventures of Slick Rick
"Children's Story"	1989	—	—	—	—	39	5	2	RIAA: Platinum	The Great Adventures of Slick Rick
"Hey Young World"	1989	—	—	—	—	—	42	17		The Great Adventures of Slick Rick
"I Shouldn't Have Done It"	1991	—	—	—	—	— (Note: "I Shouldn't Have Done It" did not enter the Dance Club Songs, but peaked at number 34 on the Dance/Electronic Singles Sales.)	50	2		Livin' Large Soundtrack / The Ruler's Back
"Mistakes of a Woman in Love with Other Men"	1991	—	—	—	—	—	—	—		The Ruler's Back
"It's a Boy"	1991	—	—	—	—	—	—	—		The Ruler's Back
"Behind Bars" (featuring Warren G)	1994	90	17	—	87	— (Note: "Behind Bars" did not enter the Dance Club Songs, but peaked at number 8 on the Dance/Electronic Singles Sales.)	63	12		Behind Bars
"Sittin' in My Car" (featuring Doug E. Fresh)	1995	—	—	—	— (Note: "Sittin' in My Car" did not enter the Billboard Hot 100, but peaked at number 1 on the Bubbling Under Hot 100.)	— (Note: "Sittin' in My Car" did not enter the Dance Club Songs, but peaked at number 18 on the Dance/Electronic Singles Sales.)	56	11		Behind Bars
"Street Talkin'" (featuring Outkast)	1999	—	—	—	—	—	65	22		The Art of Storytelling
"We Turn It" (featuring Doug E. Fresh)	1999	—	—	—	—	—	—	—		The Art of Storytelling
"Can't Shake Us" (featuring Special K)	2002	—	—	—	—	—	—	—		Non-album single
"Children's Story" (re-release)	2005	—	—	18	—	—	—	—		The Great Adventures of Slick Rick
"Snakes of the World Today"	2018	—	—	—	—	—	—	—		The Great Adventures of Slick Rick (Deluxe Edition)
"Hey Young World (Demo)"	2019	—	—	—	—	—	—	—		The Great Adventures of Slick Rick (Deluxe Edition)
"Midas Touch"	2019	—	—	—	—	—	—	—		Non-album singles
"Can't Dance To a Track That Ain't Got No Soul"	2019	—	—	—	—	—	—	—		Non-album singles
"Metropolis" (with DJ Muggs & Method Man)	2022	—	—	—	—	—	—	—		Soul Assassins 3: Death Valley
"—" denotes a recording that did not chart or was not released in that territory.

=== As featured artist ===
List of singles as featured artist, with selected chart positions, showing year released and album name
Title	Year	Chart positions				Album
Title	Year	US	US R&B	US Rap	UK	Album
"I Like" (Montell Jordan featuring Slick Rick)	1996	28	11	—	24	The Nutty Professor (soundtrack) / More...
"Got to Give It Up" (Aaliyah featuring Slick Rick)	1996	—	—	—	37	One in a Million
"Just Another Case" (CRU featuring Slick Rick)	1997	68	28	8	—	Da Dirty 30
"Unify" (Kid Capri featuring Snoop Dogg & Slick Rick)	1998					Soundtrack to the Streets / The Art of Storytellin'
"Da Art of Storytellin' (Pt. 1)" (Outkast featuring Slick Rick)	1999	—	67	—	—	Aquemini
"So Fresh" (Will Smith featuring Biz Markie & Slick Rick)	2000					Willennium
"Why Not" (Erick Sermon featuring Slick Rick)	2000					Def Squad Presents Erick Onasis
"Girls, Girls, Girls " (Jay-Z featuring Slick Rick, Q-Tip and Biz Markie)*	2001	17	4	9	11	The Blueprint
"Irresistible Delicious" (Missy Elliott featuring Slick Rick)	2005	—	—	—	—	The Cookbook
"Hip Hop Police" (Chamillionaire featuring Slick Rick)	2007	101	76	—	50	Ultimate Victory
"Who U?" (Dynas & Tony Galvin featuring Slick Rick)	2015	—	—	—	—	Big & Tall

== Guest appearances ==
Year	Song	Main artist(s)	Album / Project	Type	Role	Notes
1986	"The Show (Oh My God! Remix)"	Doug E. Fresh	Oh My God!	Studio album	Guest vocals	
1989	"If I'm Not Your Lover (12\" Remix)"	Al B. Sure!	In Effect Mode	Studio album	Guest vocals	Remix
1991	"Get Bizzy"	Greyson & Jaysun	Sweatin' Me Wet	Studio album	Guest vocals	
1994	"Let's All Get Down"	Nice & Smooth	Jewel of the Nile	Studio album	Guest vocals	
1998	"Freestyle Over 'Mona Lisa'"	Funkmaster Flex	The Mix Tape, Vol. III	Mixtape	Guest vocals	Freestyle appearance
—	"Impress the Kid"	Various artists	Rush Hour: The Art of Storytellin'	Soundtrack	Guest vocals	
—	"Fresh"	Jermaine Dupri	Life in 1472	Studio album	Guest vocals	
—	"Faces of Def"	Jayo Felony	Whatcha Gonna Do?	Studio album	Guest vocals	bonus track
1999	"If We Give You a Chance"	Warren G	I Want It All	Studio album	Guest vocals	
—	"I Sparkle"	Various artists	Wild Wild West (soundtrack)	Soundtrack	Guest vocals	
—	"Night Riders"	Rahzel	Make the Music 2000	Studio album	Guest vocals	
—	"Don't Come My Way"	Renee Neufville & Common	Whiteboys	Soundtrack	Guest vocals	
2001	"The World Is Yours"	Macy Gray	Rush Hour 2 / The Id	Soundtrack / Studio	Guest vocals	
—	"Pie"	The Rock	WWF The Music, Vol. 5	Compilation	Guest vocals	Wrestling soundtrack
—	"Guidance Counselor"	Little-T and One Track Mike	Fome Is Dape	Studio album	Guest vocals	
—	"What We Do (For Love...)"	De La Soul	AOI: Bionix	Studio album	Guest vocals	
2002	"Women Lose Weight"	Morcheeba	Charango	Studio album	Guest vocals	
2004	"The Return (Remix)"	Jay-Z & R. Kelly	Unfinished Business	Studio album	Guest vocals	Remix
—	"Trouble on the Westside"	Tony Touch	The Piece Maker 2	Compilation	Guest vocals	
2005	"The Sun"	Ghostface Killah	Put It on the Line	Studio album	Guest vocals	
—	"The Fix"	Jordan Knight featuring Doug E. Fresh	The Fix (EP)	EP	Guest vocals	
2006	"Vows"	Juggaknots	Use Your Confusion	Studio album	Guest vocals	
2009	"Y.O.U."	Asher Roth	Asleep in the Bread Aisle	Studio album	Guest vocals	UK bonus track
—	"Auditorium"	Mos Def	The Ecstatic	Studio album	Guest vocals	
—	"We Will Rob You"	Raekwon	Only Built 4 Cuban Linx... Pt. II	Studio album	Guest vocals	
—	"Family Jewels"	Dynas	The Apartment	Studio album	Guest vocals	
2011	"Need Some Bad"	Various artists	The Sitter	Soundtrack	Guest vocals	
2018	"Giving Me Life"	Mariah Carey	Caution	Studio album	Guest vocals	
—	"Constant"	Black Eyed Peas	Masters of the Sun Vol. 1	Studio album	Guest vocals	
2019	"So Misinformed"	Snoop Dogg	I Wanna Thank Me	Studio album	Guest vocals	
2020	"Ocean Prime"	Westside Gunn	Who Made the Sunshine	Studio album	Guest vocals	
—	"Good Night"	Westside Gunn	Who Made the Sunshine	Studio album	Guest vocals	
2021	"Hey Auntie"	IDK	USee4Yourself	Studio album	Guest vocals	
2022	"The Root of It All"	DJ Premier	Hip Hop 50: Volume One	Compilation	Guest vocals	
2023	"Knowledge"	Tony Touch	The Def Tape	Compilation	Guest vocals	
—	"Metropolis"	DJ Muggs	Soul Assassins 3	Studio album	Guest vocals	
2025	"Yours"	De La Soul	Cabin in the Sky	Studio album	Guest vocals	

== Filmography ==
Year	Title	Role	Notes
1988	Tougher Than Leather	Himself	
1995	The Show	Himself	Interview
1999	Whiteboyz	Parking Lot Rapper #2	
2002	Brown Sugar	Himself	Cameo
2004	Fade to Black	Himself	Documentary; uncredited cameo
2011	Rhyme and Punishment	Himself	Documentary

Year	Name	Artist
1988	Children's Story	Ricky D
	Hey Young World	Ricky D
1989	A Teenage Love	Ricky D
1991	I Shouldn't Have Done It	Ricky D
1991	Mistakes of a Woman	Ricky D
1991	It's a Boy	Ricky D
1994	Behind Bars	Ricky D
1994	Sittin in My Car	Ricky D
1995	Cuz It's Wrong	Ricky D
1996	I Like	Montell Jordan
1996	Got to Give It Up	Aaliyah
1998	Da Art of Storytellin'	OutKast
1998	Unify	Kid Capri, Snoop Dogg
1999	Street Talkin	Ricky D, OutKast
1999	Frozen	Ricky D, Raekwon
1999	So Fresh	Will Smith, Biz Markie
2000	Why Not	Erick Sermon
2007	Hip Hop Police	Chamillionaire
2018	Constant Pt 1 Pt 2	Black Eyed Peas

=== Other media ===
- Cameo in Ludacris's 2005 music video for the song "Number One Spot"
- Cameo in Busta Rhymes' 2006 music video for the song "New York Shit" featuring Swizz Beatz
- Himself in the video game Def Jam: Fight for NY
