= Hip Hop Honors =

Annual event that airs on VH1

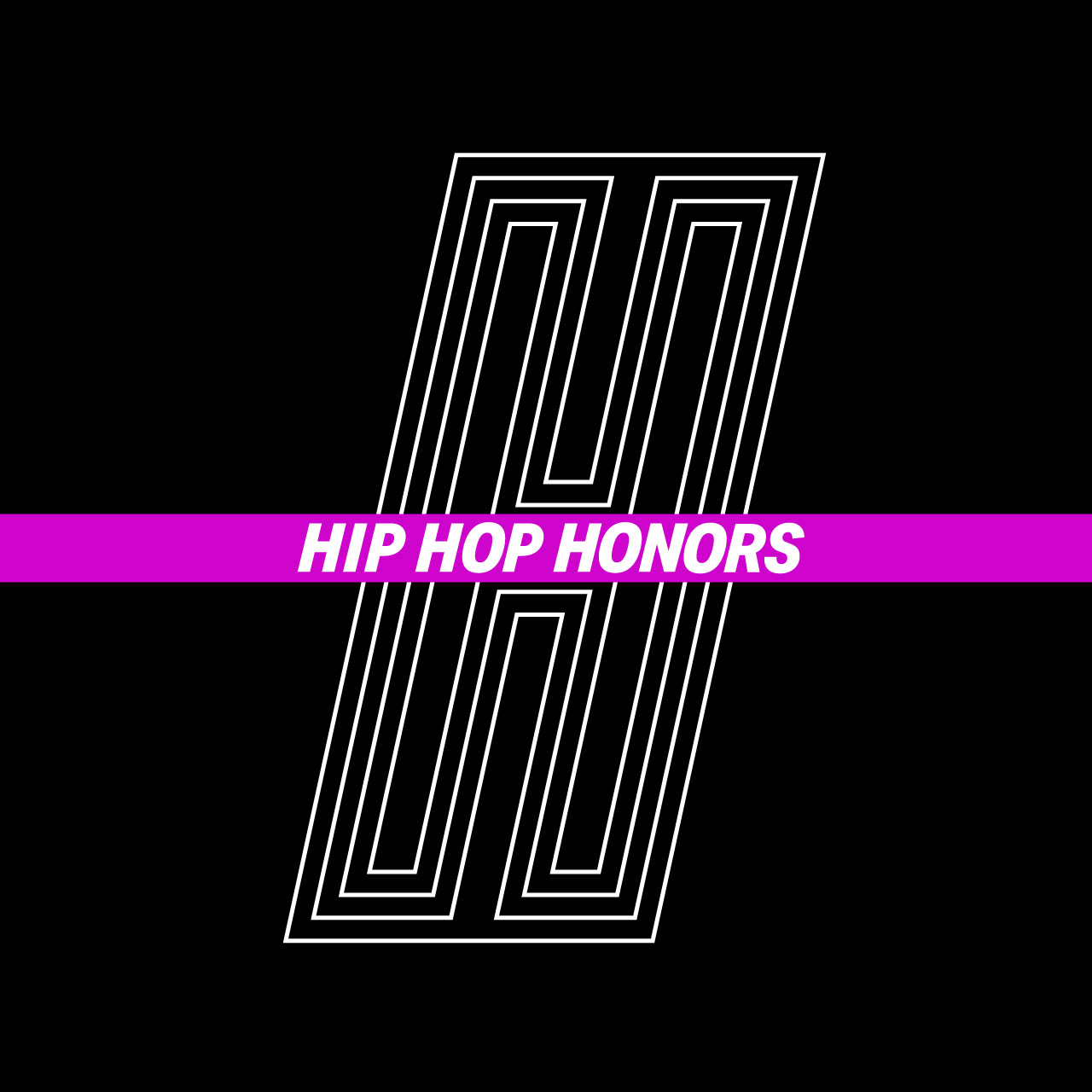
Logo of the 2016 Hip Hop Honors

The Hip Hop Honors was an annual event that aired on VH1. The television special honored old school and golden age hip-hop rappers and contributors for their long-term influence and importance in the history of hip-hop culture. It featured live performances by most of the honorees along with new artists who have been influenced by them in tribute. The show is taped at the Hammerstein Ballroom in Manhattan, New York City.

Popular hip hop musicians who attended the event include Russell Simmons, Rick Rubin, MC Lyte, Chuck D, Beastie Boys, Common, KRS-One, Flavor Flav, Ice Cube, Dr. Dre, Ice-T, A Tribe Called Quest, Kanye West, Busta Rhymes, Snoop Dogg, Rev Run, Sean "Diddy" Combs, Doug E. Fresh, LL Cool J, Afrika Bambaataa, Wu-Tang Clan, and many more.

The award show was highly valued, above most hip hop award shows who base their honorees off of commercial value rather than for their historical significance.

The Hip Hop Honors returned on July 11, 2016, in honor of the women of hip hop. The event was cancelled after the 2017 ceremony.

== 1st VH1 Hip Hop Honors (2004) ==
The first ceremony aired on October 12, 2004, and was hosted by Vivica A. Fox and MC Lyte.

=== Honorees ===
- DJ Hollywood
- Kool Herc
- KRS-One
- Public Enemy
- Run-DMC
- Rock Steady Crew
- Sugarhill Gang
- 2Pac
- The Graffiti Movement

=== Presenters ===
- Roselyn Sanchez
- Debbie Harry
- Tracy Morgan
- Ice-T
- Taye Diggs
- P. Diddy
- Wyclef Jean
- Foxy Brown

=== Performances ===
- Beastie Boys, Mix Master Mike and Doug E. Fresh – "Here We Go" and "Sucker M.C.'s"
- Fat Joe and Terror Squad – "Lean Back"
- Nas and Olu Dara – "Bridging the Gap"
- Fat Joe – "South Bronx"
- Doug E. Fresh, Kid Rock, Kid Capri and Grandmaster Flash – "DJ Medley"
- Nas – "Keep Ya Head Up"
- Beastie Boys – "Right Right Now Now"
- Public Enemy, Beastie Boys, Anthrax – "Black Steel in the Hour of Chaos"/"Fight the Power"/"Bring the Noise"
- MC Hammer – "Unconditional Love" (danced and read lyrics from this rap which was originally by 2pac but later given to Hammer as a gift from him that Hammer later did a remake of on his Family Affair album.)
- Sugarhill Gang & Chic – "Rapper's Delight"/"Good Times"
- Common – "On the 88' Tip"

== 2nd VH1 Hip Hop Honors (2005) ==
The second ceremony aired on September 26, 2005, hosted by Russell Simmons and Rev. Run.

=== Honorees ===
- Big Daddy Kane
- Boyz n the Hood
- Grandmaster Flash and the Furious Five
- Ice-T
- LL Cool J
- The Notorious B.I.G.
- Salt N Pepa

=== Presenters ===
- Anthony Anderson
- Jerry Ferrara
- Spike Lee

=== Performances ===
- Snoop Dogg – "Warning"
- Ice-T – "OG Original Gangster"/"Colors"
- Salt N Pepa featuring En Vogue – "Whatta Man"
- Nelly featuring Ciara – "Doin It"
- Nelly – "I'm Bad"
- LL Cool J – "Mama Said Knock You Out"
- Kanye West – "Gold Digger"
- Faith Evans, Lil' Cease, Ludacris & Kanye West – "Juicy"/ "One More Chance"/ "Hypnotize"
- Common, Black Thought & T.I. – "Raw", "Smooth Operator", & "Set It Off"
- Big Daddy Kane – "Warm It Up, Kane"
- Diddy & Faith Evans – "I'll Be Missing You"

== 3rd VH1 Hip Hop Honors (2006) ==
The third aired on October 17, 2006, with host Ice-T.

=== Honorees ===
- Afrika Bambaataa
- Beastie Boys
- Eazy-E
- Ice Cube
- MC Lyte
- Rakim
- Russell Simmons
- Wu-Tang Clan

=== Presenters ===
- KRS-One & Outkast – Afrika Bambaataa
- Tracy Morgan – Beastie Boys
- Ice Cube & Ice-T- Eazy-E
- Mike Epps & Fab 5 Freddy- Ice Cube
- Regina King – MC Lyte
- Common – Rakim
- Diddy – Russell Simmons
- Forest Whitaker – Wu-Tang Clan

=== Performances ===
- Lil' Eazy-E, Young Jeezy, DJ Yella – "We Want Eazy"
- Bone Thugs N Harmony – "Tha Crossroads"
- Xzibit – "Check Yo Self"
- WC – "It Was a Good Day"
- Ice Cube – "Why We Thugs"/"Go to Church" w/ Lil Jon
- Diddy, Fabolous and Q-Tip – "Hold It, Now Hit It"/"Paul Revere"
- Beastie Boys – "So What'cha Want"/"The New Style"
- Lil' Kim, Remy Ma, Da Brat, and Yo-Yo – "Cha Cha Cha"/"Kickin' 4 Brooklyn"/"Lyte as a Rock"
- MC Lyte – "Paper Thin"/"Ruffneck"
- Black Thought, Talib Kweli, Styles P., Raekwon – "Paid In Full"/"Eric B. For President"
- Rakim – "Microphone Fiend"/"I Ain't No Joke"
- Wu-Tang Clan – "C.R.E.A.M."/"Triumph"
- Erykah Badu, George Clinton and the funkadelics
- Rakim – It's Nothing

== 4th VH1 Hip Hop Honors (2007) ==
The fourth show aired October 8, 2007, and was hosted by Tracy Morgan.

=== Honorees ===
- A Tribe Called Quest
- Missy Elliott
- Snoop Dogg
- Whodini
- Teddy Riley and Andre Harrell for new jack swing
- Wild Style

=== Presenters ===
- Kerry Washington – Missy Elliott
- P. Diddy and Doug E. Fresh – Andre Harrell and Teddy Riley
- LL Cool J – Wild Style
- Chris Rock – Whodini
- Harvey Keitel – Snoop Dogg
- Tracy Morgan – A Tribe Called Quest

=== Performances ===
- Tweet – "The Rain (Supa Dupa Fly)"
- Timbaland & Eve – "Work It"
- Eve and Keyshia Cole – "Hot Boyz"
- Fatman Scoop and Ciara – "Lose Control"
- Nelly Furtado – "Get Ur Freak On (Remix)"
- Ne-Yo – "I Like"
- T-Pain – "I Want Her"
- Ne-Yo & Keyshia Cole – "Remember the Time"
- Kool Moe Dee – "How Ya Like Me Now"
- Teddy Riley – "No Diggity"/"Rump Shaker"
- Nick Cannon – "Funky Beat"
- Nelly – "One Love"
- Jermaine Dupri – "Five Minutes of Funk"
- Whodini – "Friends" and "Freaks Come Out at Night"
- T.I. and B.G. – "Deep Cover"
- Pharrell and Daz – "Nuthin' But a 'G' Thang"
- Ice-T – "Gin and Juice"
- Bow Wow – "Who Am I (What's My Name)"
- Snoop Dogg and Pharrell – "Drop It Like It's Hot"
- Busta Rhymes, Common, Lupe Fiasco, and Pharrell – "Bonita Applebum"/"Electric Relaxation"/"Scenario"
- A Tribe Called Quest – "Check the Rhime"/"Award Tour"

== 5th Annual Hip Hop Honors (2008) ==
The fifth show aired October 6, 2008 and was hosted by Tracy Morgan.

=== Honorees ===
- Cypress Hill
- De La Soul
- Naughty By Nature
- Slick Rick
- Too Short

=== Presenters ===
- Freddy Rodriguez – Cypress Hill
- Joy Bryant – De La Soul
- Michael Strahan – Slick Rick
- Luke Campbell – Too Short
- Eve – Naughty by Nature

=== Performances ===
- Fat Joe – "The Phuncky Feel One"
- Jim Jones – "I Ain't Goin' Out Like That"
- Gym Class Heroes and Mack 10 – "Insane in the Brain"
- Cypress Hill – "How I Could Just Kill a Man" / "(Rock) Superstar"
- Q-Tip & Estelle – "A Roller Skating Jam Named "Saturdays""
- Mos Def & Public Enemy – "Stakes Is High"
- Cee-Lo – "Potholes in My Lawn"
- EPMD – "Ego Trippin' (Part Two)"
- De La Soul and Q-Tip – "Me Myself and I" / "Oooh." / "Buddy"
- MC Lyte – "The Ruler's Back"
- Busta Rhymes with Spliff Star – "The Show"
- Ghostface Killah w/ Biz Markie – "La Di Da Di"
- Fabolous and Dana Dane – "Hey Young World"
- Eve – "Mona Lisa"
- Slick Rick – "Children's Story"
- Estelle w/ The Roots – "Ike’s Mood 1"
- Mos Def w/ The Roots – "Warning"
- Scarface w/ The Roots – "Mind Playing Tricks on Me"
- Public Enemy w/ The Roots – "Black Steel in the Hour of Chaos"
- Kid Rock – "Life Is...Too Short"
- Lil Jon – "Shake That Monkey"
- Bun B – "Blow the Whistle"
- Scarface – "The Ghetto"
- Too Short – "Gettin' It" / "Money in the Ghetto"
- Wyclef Jean and Juelz Santana – "Everything's Gonna Be Alright"
- Big Boi w/ Wyclef Jean – "O.P.P."
- Naughty by Nature – "Uptown Anthem" / "Hip Hop Hooray"

== 6th Annual Hip Hop Honors (2009) ==
The sixth show aired October 13, 2009 and was hosted by Tracy Morgan.

=== Honorees ===
- Def Jam Recordings

=== Presenters ===
- Tracy Morgan
- Chris Rock
- Anthony Anderson
- Jimmy Fallon
- Brett Ratner

=== Performances ===
- Eminem, The Roots, and DJ Jazzy Jeff – "Rock the Bells"
- Public Enemy with the Roots, Street Sweeper Social Club and DJ Jazzy Jeff – "Rebel Without a Pause"
- Method Man & Redman – "Da Rockwilder"
- DMX and Gym Class Heroes – "Party Up (Up in Here)"
- Ludacris and Scarface – "Guess Who's Back/Southern Hospitality"
- Mary J. Blige and Method Man – "I'll Be There for You/You're All I Need to Get By"
- Rick Ross- "Hustlin'"
- Warren G and Trey Songz – "Regulate"
- Gym Class Heroes, Wale and KRS-One – "No Sleep till Brooklyn"
- Ja Rule and Ashanti – "Down 4 U"/"Always on Time"
- Onyx – "Slam"
- Kid Rock – "I'm Bad"
- EPMD – "Crossover"
- Foxy Brown and Fabolous – "I'll Be"
- Ghostface Killah and Chrisette Michele – "Back Like That"
- Wale – "Touch the Sky"

== 7th VH1 Hip Hop Honors (2010) ==
The seventh Hip Hop Honors aired on June 7, 2010, hosted by Craig Robinson. The ceremony featured various artists from the 'Dirty South.'

=== Honorees ===
- 2 Live Crew
- Luther Campbell
- Mr. Mixx
- Brother Marquis
- Fresh Kid Ice
- J. Prince
- Jermaine Dupri
- Master P
- Organized Noise
- Timbaland
- Tyrone

=== Presenters ===
- Jonah Hill
- Donald Glover
- Taraji P. Henson
- T.I.
- Lauren London
- Kelly Rowland
- Eddie Griffin
- Kid Rock
- David Banner
- Rozonda "Chilli" Thomas

=== Performances ===
Uncle Luke Tribute with DJ Buddha, including a medley of the following songs and performers:

- "It’s Your Birthday",” featuring Luther Campbell
- "Scarred",” featuring Luther Campbell, Trick Daddy and Pitbull
- "I Wanna Rock (Doo Doo Brown)",” featuring Luther Campbell

J. Prince/Rap-a-Lot Tribute with DJ Domination, including a medley of the following songs and performers:

- Mind Playing Tricks on Me,” Game and Willie D
- Po Pimp,” featuring "A.K".
- Nolia Clap,” featuring Juvenile
- Get Throwed,” featuring Drake and Bun B

Jermaine Dupri Tribute with DJ Lil Jon, including a medley of the following songs and performers:

- I Think They Like Me,” featuring Jermaine Dupri, Dem Franchize Boyz, "Buddie (Gerald Tiller)", "Jizzal Man (Bernard Leverette)", "Parlae" and "Pimpin' (Jamal Willingham)"’
- Money Ain't a Thang,” featuring Jermaine Dupri
- Jump,” featuring Bow Wow, Jermaine Dupri and Lil Jon
- Fresh Azimiz,” featuring Bow Wow, Jermaine Dupri and Lil Jon
- Welcome to Atlanta,” featuring P. Diddy and Jermaine Dupri

Master P Tribute with DJ Kid Capri, including a medley of the following songs and performers:

- I'm Bout It,” featuring Romeo Miller, "Lil D", "Black Don" and "Valentino"
- "That's Cool",” featuring Silkk the Shocker and Trina
- I Miss My Homies,” featuring Gucci Mane
- Make 'Em Say Uhh!” featuring Mystikal

Atlanta Medley with DJ Drama, including the following songs and performers:

- Wasted,” featuring Gucci Mane
- Never Scared,” featuring Bone Crusher
- Get Low (song),” featuring Lil Jon, Ying Yang Twins, "Kaine" and "D-Roc"

Timbaland Tribute with DJ Freestyle Steve, including a medley of the following songs and performers:

- Big Pimpin,” featuring Bun B
- Make Me Better,” featuring Fabolous
- The Way I Are,” featuring Keri Hilson, D.O.E. and Sebastian
- Get Ur Freak On,” featuring Missy Elliott
- Work It,” featuring Missy Elliott

Texas Medley with DJ Michael 5000 Watts, including the following songs and performers:

- "Like a Boss",” featuring Slim Thug
- Sittin' Sidewayz,” featuring Paul Wall
- Ridin',” featuring Chamillionaire

2 Live Crew Tribute with DJ Mixx, including a medley of the following songs and performers:

- Me So Horny,” featuring "Fresh Kid Ice" and "Marquis"
- "Hoochie Mama",” featuring "Marquis" and "Fresh Kid Ice"
- Banned in the U.S.A.,” featuring Uncle Luke

Organized Noize Tribute with DJ Jelly, including a medley of the following songs and performers:

- Player's Ball,” featuring "Rico Wade"
- Southernplayalisticadillacmuzik,” featuring Nelly, Murphy Lee and "Rico Wade"
- Cell Therapy,” featuring Khujo and "Rico Wade"
- "Dirty South",” featuring Khujo and Cool Breeze
- So Fresh, So Clean,” featuring Cool Breeze, Sleepy Brown and "Rico Wade"
- Saturday (Oooh! Ooooh!),” featuring Asher Roth, "Rico Wade" and Sleepy Brown

Miami Medley with DJ Khaled, including the following songs and performers:

- "Million Dollar Girl",” featuring Trina
- Low,” featuring Flo Rida
- I'm So Hood,” featuring Rick Ross and "DJ Sam Sneed"
- Super High,” featuring Rick Ross and "DJ Sam Sneed"
- I Know You Want Me,” featuring Pitbull

== 8th VH1 Hip Hop Honors (2016) ==
The eighth Hip Hop Honors aired on July 11, 2016 hosted by Eve. This show honored the women of hip-hop.

=== Honorees ===
- Missy Elliott
- Queen Latifah
- Salt-N-Pepa
- Lil' Kim

=== Performances ===
- Remy Ma & Fat Joe – All the Way Up
- Fantasia, Monica & Tweet – Lady Marmalade
- Remy Ma, Nelly Furtado & Trina – Work It
- Queen Latifah, MC Lyte, Mia X, Nikki D, Da Brat & Rah Digga – U.N.I.T.Y.
- Queen Latifah, Da Brat, Rah Digga, Lady of Rage & Yo-Yo – When You're Good to Mama

Queen Latifah Tribute by Naughty by Nature:

- Naughty by Nature – Hip Hop Hooray

== 9th VH1 Hip Hop Honors (2017) ==
The ninth and final Hip Hop Honors aired on September 18, 2017 hosted by Regina Hall. This show honored the 90's Game Changers.

=== Honorees ===
- Mariah Carey
- Jermaine Dupri
- Martin Lawrence
- Master P
- Hype Williams

=== Presenters ===
- DJ Khaled and Asahd Khaled
- Kelly Rowland
- Keith Powers and Karrueche Tran
- T.I.
- Pharrell Williams
- Tichina Arnold, Affion Crocket, and Lamorne Morris
- Ice Cube

=== Performances ===
- Missy Elliott – She's A Bitch
- Mariah Carey, Jermaine Dupri, Da Brat, The Lox and Mase – Honey

Mobb Deep Tribute:

- Havoc, Lil' Kim and Fabolous – Quiet Storm

'90s Party Anthems Medley, including the following songs and performers:

- Ty Dolla $ign – "This Is How We Do It"
- Xscape's Kandi and Tiny – "No Scrubs"
- Warren G and Ty Dolla $ign – "Regulate"
- Fat Joe and Remy Ma – "Still Not A Player"

Jermaine Dupri & Master P Tribute, including a medley of the following songs and performers:

- Trick Daddy and Trina – "Nann"
- Romeo – "I Got the Hook-Up!"
- Silkk The Shocker and Romeo – "Make Em Say Uhh!"
- Xscape – "Just Kickin' It"
