= One (Bob James album) =

Studio album by Bob James
- Released: June 4, 1974
- Recorded: February–April 1974
- Studios: Van Gelder, Englewood Cliffs
- Genres: Jazz fusion, smooth jazz
- Length: 33:58
- Label: CTI
- Producer: Creed Taylor

Bob James chronology
Explosions (1965)	One (1974)	Two (1975)

One is the first solo album, and third album overall, by jazz keyboardist Bob James. It was an important album in the early smooth jazz genre and is famous for its end track, "Nautilus", which became important to hip hop as one of the most sampled tracks in American music.

== Reception ==
Professional ratings
Review scores
Source	Rating
AllMusic	4/5 stars
The Rolling Stone Jazz Record Guide	2/5 stars

Released on April 17, 1974, this album charted at number two on the Jazz Album Charts.

== Track listing ==
1. "Valley of the Shadows" (James) – 9:42
2. "In the Garden" (Johann Pachelbel) – 3:06
3. "Soulero" (James, Richard Evans) – 3:22
4. "Night on Bald Mountain" (Modest Mussorgsky) – 5:51
5. "Feel Like Making Love" (Gene McDaniels) – 6:40
6. "Nautilus" (James) – 5:08

== Personnel ==
- Bob James – keyboards, arrangements and conductor
- Richie Resnicoff – guitars
- Eric Weissberg – pedal steel guitar (2)
- Gary King – bass
- Steve Gadd – drums (1–4)
- Idris Muhammad – drums (5, 6)
- Ralph MacDonald – percussion
- David Friedman – vibraphone
- Grover Washington Jr. – soprano saxophone (1, 3)
- Hugh McCracken – harmonica (2)

Brass and woodwinds

- George Marge and Romeo Penque – alto flute, recorder
- Wayne Andre – trombone
- Paul Faulise, Jack Gale and Alan Raph – bass trombone
- Jon Faddis and Thad Jones – flugelhorn
- Jon Faddis, Thad Jones, Victor Paz, Alan Rubin, Lew Soloff and Marvin Stamm – trumpet

Strings

- Seymour Barab, Jesse Levy, Charles McCracken, George Ricci, Alan Shulman and Anthony Sophos – cello
- Max Ellen, Paul Gershman, Emanuel Green, Harold Kohon, Charles Libove, Harry Lookofsky, Joseph Malin, David Nadien and Gene Orloff – violin

Production

- Creed Taylor – producer
- Rudy Van Gelder – engineer
- Stuart J. Romaine – mastering at CBS Recording Studios (New York, NY).
- Joe Jorgensen – mastering supervisor
- Bob Ciano – album design
- Gene Laurents – cover photography

== Charts ==
Chart (1974)	Peak position
Billboard Pop Albums	85
Billboard Top Soul Albums	48
Billboard Top Jazz Albums	2

=== Singles ===
Year	Single	Chart positions
Year	Single	US
1974	"Feel Like Makin' Love"	88

== Samples & Covers ==
- Ultramagnetic MCs sampled "Nautilus" on their song "Ced-Gee (Delta Force One)" on their album Critical Beatdown in 1988.
- Run–D.M.C. sampled "Nautilus" on their song "Beats To The Rhyme" on their album Tougher Than Leather in 1988.
- Slick Rick reinterpreted the pattern of the bassline to "Nautilus" on his song "Children's Story" on his album The Great Adventures of Slick Rick in 1988.
- Public Enemy sampled "Nautilus" on their song "Anti-Nigger Machine" on their album Fear of a Black Planet in 1990.
- Eric B. & Rakim sampled "Nautilus" on their hit song "Let The Rhythm Hit 'Em" on their album Let the Rhythm Hit 'Em in 1990.
- EPMD sampled "Nautilus" on their song "Brothers On My Jock" on their album Business as Usual in 1990.
- Main Source sampled "Feel Like Makin' Love" on their song "Scratch & Kut" on their album Breaking Atoms in 1991.
- Main Source sampled "Nautilus" on their song "Live at the Barbeque" on their album Breaking Atoms in 1991.
- Kruder & Dorfmeister sampled "Nautilus" on their song "Original Bedroom Rockers" on the G-Stoned EP in 1993.
- Ultramagnetic MCs sampled "Nautilus" on their song "Raise It Up" on their album The Four Horsemen in 1993.
- Onyx sampled "Nautilus" on their song "Throw Ya Gunz" on their album Bacdafucup in 1993.
- Naughty by Nature sampled "Nautilus" on their song "Cruddy Clique" on their album 19 Naughty III in 1993.
- A Tribe Called Quest sampled "Nautilus" on their song "Clap Your Hands" on their album Midnight Marauders in 1993.
- Jeru the Damaja sampled "Nautilus" on his song "My Mind Spray" on his album The Sun Rises in the East in 1994.
- Pete Rock & CL Smooth sampled "Nautilus" on their song "Sun Won't Come Out" on their album The Main Ingredient in 1994.
- Group Home sampled "Nautilus" on their song "Inna Citi Life" on their album Livin' Proof in 1995.
- Ghostface Killah sampled "Nautilus" on his song "Daytona 500" on his album Ironman in 1996.
- Nuyorican Soul covered "Nautilus" on their album Nuyorican Soul in 1997.
- Murs & 9th Wonder sampled "Nautilus" on their song "Murray's Revenge" on their album Murray's Revenge in 2006.
- Danny Brown sampled "Nautilus" on his song "Pac Blood" on his album XXX in 2011.
- Freddie Gibbs sampled "Nautilus" on his song "Extradite" (featuring rapper Black Thought) on his album Shadow of a Doubt in 2015.
- Maxo Kream sampled "Nautilus" on his song "Go" (featuring rapper D Flowers) on his album Punken in 2018.
- Soul II Soul sampled "Nautilus" on a remix version of the song "Jazzie's Groove" in the early 1990s.
