= Behind Bars =

Behind bars may refer to:

- Imprisonment
- Life imprisonment

== Film and TV ==
- Louis Theroux: Behind Bars
- Martha: Behind Bars (2005) TV-movie
- Hinter Gittern – Der Frauenknast German television soap opera 1997
- "Behind Bars" (Line of Duty), 2014 TV episode
- Behind Bars: The World's Toughest Prisons (2016), a German-made American documentary series.

== Music ==
- Behind Bars (Slick Rick album), a 1994 album by Slick Rick
  - "Behind Bars" (Slick Rick song)
- Behind Bars, album by 88 Fingers Louie, 1995
- "Behind Bars", song from The Wanted (album), 2010
- "Behind Bars", song by the Jayhawks from The Jayhawks (album), 1986
- "Behind Bars", single by Fei Comodo, 2009

== Other uses ==
- Behind Bars (book), a 2011 book by Elaine Gould
