= The Art of Storytelling =

Studio album by Slick Rick
- Released: May 25, 1999
- Recorded: 1998–1999
- Genre: Hip hop
- Length: 73:28
- Label: Def Jam
- Producer: DJ Clark Kent; Kid Capri; DJ S&S; Rashad Smith; Poke & Tone

Slick Rick chronology
| Behind Bars (1994) | The Art of Storytelling (1999) | Victory (2025) |

Singles from The Art of Storytelling
- 1. "Street Talkin'" Released: September 4, 1999

The Art of Storytelling is the fourth studio album by British-American rapper Slick Rick. Originally scheduled for a February 1999 release, it was ultimately released May 25, 1999, by Def Jam Recordings. The album features production from DJ Clark Kent and Kid Capri, among others. Upon its release, The Art of Storytelling proved to be Slick Rick's highest-charting album, peaking at number eight on the Billboard 200, and number one on the Top R&B/Hip-Hop Albums, and was certified gold by the RIAA within a month of its release.

== Critical reception ==
Professional ratings
Review scores
| Source | Rating |
|---|---|
| AllMusic | 4/5 stars |
| Entertainment Weekly | B+ |
| (The New) Rolling Stone Album Guide | 4/5 stars |
| The Source | 4/5 stars |
| Spin | 7/10 |
| USA Today | 3.5/4 stars |
| The Village Voice | A− |

The Art of Storytelling received positive reviews from music critics. Stephen Thomas Erlewine of AllMusic called it a "worthy sequel" to Slick Rick's debut album The Great Adventures of Slick Rick. While praising its "smooth production", he believed The Art of Storytelling had a strong emphasis on lyrics, which he described as "continually surprising and thought-provoking". Matt Diehl of Entertainment Weekly highlighted Slick Rick's vocal performance, saying that "his breathy singsong delivery remains a hip-hop national treasure". Steve Jones of USA Today commended the rapper's "unique blend of chest-thumping rhymes, razor-sharp witticisms and pointed observations".

Robert Christgau of The Village Voice called it an "unflappably deft comeback". He believed that the album's minimalistic production "showcase[s] the feyly effeminate king's-honeydrip singsong". Kris Ex of Vibe wrote: "Thoroughly entertaining throughout, Rick spins unique couplets, melds vocal inflections, and breaks those nasal vocals into song".

Comparing it to contemporary releases, some reviewers viewed The Art of Storytelling as a throwback to golden age hip-hop. Raquel Cepeda, in a review for The Source, called it a "memoir of a B-boy's dream", adding that Slick Rick "sharply wields the garish style he pioneered back in '85". Describing it as a "genuine return to form", Joe Gross of Spin highlighted the fact that hip-hop's vocal techniques improved dramatically while Slick Rick was in jail. "Seems like no one told Rick, and the results are weirdly charming", added the journalist. The Washington Post's David Wall Rice named it Slick Rick's best album since the debut, adding that the rapper "[is] staying true to his original concept of presenting dance-ready rhymes that don't take themselves too seriously". He criticized the opening track "Kill Niggaz" for its darker themes, believing that playful tracks fit "Rick's nonchalant delivery" better.

== Track listing ==
Credits adapted from the album's liner notes.

| No. | Title | Writer(s) | Producer(s) | Length |
|---|---|---|---|---|
| 1. | "Jail Skit" (featuring Ed Lover, Redman & Rev Run) | | Bimmy Antney | 1:20 |
| 2. | "Kill Niggaz" | Richard Walters; Rodolfo Franklin | DJ Clark Kent | 2:50 |
| 3. | "Street Talkin'" (featuring Outkast) | Walters; Andre Patton; André Benjamin; Phalon Alexander | Jazze Pha | 3:41 |
| 4. | "Me & Nas Bring It to Your Hardest" (featuring Nas) | Walters; Jean-Claude Olivier; Samuel Barnes; Qu'ran Goodman; Nasir Jones | Qur'an Goodman; Poke and Tone | 2:36 |
| 5. | "I Own America Part I" | Walters; Tyrone Fyffe; Franklin | DJ Clark Kent; Tyrone Fyffe | 3:09 |
| 6. | "Bugsy Radio Skit" | | Bimmy Antney | 0:19 |
| 7. | "Who Rotten 'Em" | Walters; Junod Etienne | Nod | 3:28 |
| 8. | "2 Way Street" | Walters; Franklin | DJ Clark Kent | 3:33 |
| 9. | "King Piece in the Chess Game" (featuring Canibus) | Walters; Fyffe; Germaine Williams; Deadric Malone | Tyrone Fyffe | 3:20 |
| 10. | "Trapped in Me" | Walters; Rashad Smith; Chano Pozo | Rashad Smith | 3:42 |
| 11. | "Impress the Kid" | Walters; Shampelle Everett | S&S | 3:34 |
| 12. | "Q-Tip & Peter Gunz Skit" | | Bimmy Antney | 0:35 |
| 13. | "I Run This" | Walters; Raymond Deal; Joseph Simmons; Darryl McDaniels; Jason Mizell; Russell Simmons; Douglas Davis; Frank Eyton; Johnny Green; Edward Heyman; Robert Sour | Raymond Deal; Joseph "DJ Rev. Run" Simmons | 4:09 |
| 14. | "Frozen" (featuring Raekwon) | Walters; Daniel Almer; James Atney; Corey Woods; Bill Conti; Shelby Conti; Chris West; Geoff Barrow; Beth Gibbons; Adrian Utley | T. Rusiak; Bimmy Antney (co.) | 3:12 |
| 15. | "Why, Why, Why" | Walters; Franklin; James Brown | DJ Clark Kent; Slick Rick | 3:23 |
| 16. | "Adults Only" | Walters; Damon Blackman | Dame Grease | 4:16 |
| 17. | "Memories" | Walters; Franklin; Clarence Reid | DJ Clark Kent | 4:06 |
| 18. | "Unify" (featuring Snoop Dogg) | Walters; Calvin Broadus; Rudy Toombs; David Love | Kid Capri | 3:59 |
| 19. | "Bugsy Radio Skit" | | Bimmy Antney | 0:18 |
| 20. | "I Own America Part 2" | Walters; Almer; Atney; Benjamin Wright | Colleone & Webb; Bimmy Antney (co.) | 3:30 |
| 21. | "CEO Outro" | | Slick Rick | 0:05 |

Bonus tracks
| No. | Title | Writer(s) | Producer | Length |
|---|---|---|---|---|
| 22. | "We Turn It On" (featuring Doug E. Fresh) | Walters; Davis; Vada Nobles | Vada Nobles | 3:35 |
| 23. | "La Di Da Di (Live)" (featuring Doug E. Fresh) | Walters; Davis | Slick Rick | 4:37 |
| 24. | "The Show (Live)" (featuring Doug E. Fresh) | Walters; Davis | Slick Rick | 6:09 |

Sample credits

- "King Piece in the Chess Game" contains a sample from "Sad Feeling", written by Deadric Malone, and performed by Bobby Bland.
- "Trapped in Me" contains a sample from "Tin Tin Deo", written by Chano Pozo, and performed by Buddy Montgomery.
- "I Run This" contains samples from:
  - "Children's Story", written and performed by Slick Rick.
  - "Jam Master Jay", written by Darryl McDaniels, Jason Mizell, Joseph Simmons, and Russell Simmons, and performed by Run-DMC.
  - "The Show" and "La Di Da Di", written and performed by Doug E. Fresh and Slick Rick.
  - "Body and Soul", written by Frank Eyton, Johnny Green, Edward Heyman, and Robert Sour, and performed by Sonny Rollins.
- "Frozen" contains:
  - an interpolation from "Make It Last All Night", written by Bill Conti, Shelby Conti, and Chris West.
  - a sample from "Seven Months", written by Geoff Barrow, Beth Gibbons, and Adrian Utley, and performed by Portishead.
- "Why, Why, Why" contains a sample from "Funky President (People It's Bad)", written and performed by James Brown.
- "Memories" contains a sample from "The Best Girls Don't Always Win", written by Clarence Reid, and performed by Betty Wright.
- "Unify" contains a sample from "One Mint Julep", written by Rudy Toombs.
- "I Own America Part 2" contains a sample from "I Can't Go On Living Without You", written by Benjamin Wright, and performed by Tavares.
- "We Turn It On" contains a sample of "The Show" written and performed by Doug E. Fresh and Slick Rick.

== Charts ==
=== Weekly charts ===
| Chart (1999) | Peak position |
|---|---|
| US Billboard 200 | 8 |
| US Top R&B/Hip-Hop Albums (Billboard) | 1 |

=== Year-end charts ===
| Chart (1999) | Position |
|---|---|
| US Billboard 200 | 171 |
| US Top R&B/Hip-Hop Albums (Billboard) | 54 |

== Certifications ==
| Region | Certification | Certified units/sales |
|---|---|---|
| United States (RIAA) | Gold | 500,000^{^} |
^{^} Shipments figures based on certification alone.

== See also ==
- List of Billboard number-one R&B albums of 1999
