= Da Art of Storytellin' (Pt. 1) =

Single by Outkast featuring Slick Rick

from the album Aquemini
- Released: May 25, 1999
- Recorded: 1998
- Genre: Alternative hip-hop
- Length: 3:43
- Label: LaFace, Arista, RCA
- Songwriters: André Benjamin, Antwan Patton, David Sheats
- Producer: Mr. DJ

Outkast singles chronology
"Rosa Parks" (1999)	"Da Art of Storytellin' (Pt. 1)" (1999)	"Street Talkin'" (1999)

Slick Rick singles chronology
"Unify" (1998)	"Da Art of Storytellin' (Pt. 1)" (1999)	"Street Talkin'" (1999)

"Da Art of Storytellin' (Pt. 1)" is the third and final single from hip-hop duo Outkast's third studio album Aquemini. The song was released as a single on May 25, 1999, but failed to chart on the Billboard Hot 100. It peaked at #67 on the Hot R&B/Hip-Hop Songs chart. Only the single version of the song features Slick Rick, with his verse completely absent from the album version. This song is not to be confused with Slick Rick's album The Art of Storytelling, released on the same day. This song is sampled in J. Cole's song "Land of the Snakes" from his studio album Born Sinner.

"Da Art of Storytellin' (Pt. 1)" is widely considered one of Outkast's best songs. In 2020, The Ringer ranked it ninth on its list of the 50 greatest Outkast songs, and in 2021, The Guardian ranked the song fourth on its list of the 20 greatest Outkast songs.

== Track listing ==
CD Single

1. "Da Art Of Storytellin'" (Clean Mix) - 4:14
2. "Da Art Of Storytellin'" (Instrumental)- 4:10
3. "Da Art Of Storytellin'" (Call Out Research Hook) - 0:10

Maxi Single

1. "Da Art Of Storytellin'" (Album Version) - 4:11
2. "Da Art Of Storytellin'" (Featuring Slick Rick - Single Version) - 4:10
3. "Da Art Of Storytellin'" (Featuring Slick Rick - Acapella) - 4:06
4. "SpottieOttieDopaliscious" (Album Version) - 3:30

12" Vinyl Single

1. "Da Art Of Storytellin'" (Clean Mix) - 4:14
2. "Da Art Of Storytellin'" (Instrumental) - 4:11
3. "Da Art Of Storytellin'" (Dirty Mix) - 4:11
4. "Da Art Of Storytellin'" (Acapella) - 4:06

== Charts ==
Chart (1999)	Peak position
US Billboard Hot R&B/Hip-Hop Songs	67

== Certifications ==
Region	Certification	Certified units/sales
United States (RIAA)	Gold	500,000^{‡}
^{‡} Sales+streaming figures based on certification alone.
