= Sittin' in My Car =

Single by Slick Rick featuring Doug E. Fresh

from the album Behind Bars
- B-side: "Cuz It's Wrong"
- Released: February 14, 1995
- Recorded: 1995
- Genre: Hip hop
- Length: 3:45
- Label: Def Jam Recordings
- Songwriter: Ricky Walters
- Producers: Vance Wright, Jermaine Dupri, Easy Mo Bee

Slick Rick singles chronology
"Behind Bars" (1994)	"Sittin' in My Car" (1995)	"I Like" (1996)

"Sittin' in My Car" is the second single released from Slick Rick's third album, Behind Bars. It was released on February 14, 1995 and was produced by Vance Wright, with a remix done by Jermaine Dupri and beatboxing done by Doug E. Fresh. The single managed to make it to #24 on the Hot R&B Singles and #11 on the Hot Rap Singles. The song title and chorus references the singer Billy Stewart's single "Sitting in the Park" and also samples the song.

== Track listing ==
=== A-Side ===
1. "Sittin' in My Car" (Def Mix)- 3:38
2. "Sittin' in My Car" (LP Version)- 3:45
3. "Sittin' in My Car" (Lad's Lexus Mix)Remixed by Tisdale Frederick sr aka Cuffgodd - 4:04

=== B-Side ===
1. "Sittin' in My Car" (Def Instrumental)- 3:32
2. "Cuz It's Wrong" (LP Version)- 3:23
