= Children's Story =

1989 single by Slick Rick

Single by Slick Rick

from the album The Great Adventures of Slick Rick
- Released: April 4, 1989
- Genre: Hip-hop
- Length: 4:02
- Label: Def Jam; Columbia
- Songwriter: Ricky Walters
- Producer: Slick Rick

Slick Rick singles chronology
"Teenage Love" (1988)	"Children's Story" (1989)	"Hey Young World" (1989)

Music video
- "Children's Story" on YouTube

"Children's Story" is a song by British-American rapper Slick Rick, which was released on April 4, 1989, through Def Jam Recordings and Columbia Records, as the second single from his debut album The Great Adventures of Slick Rick (1989). The song, written and produced by Rick, is a morality tale based on a 17-year-old boy who lives a life of crime and gets killed by police.

Prior to the song, Rick had prominently been known for his collaborations with Doug E. Fresh on the songs "The Show" and "La Di Da Di" (both 1985), which were both sampled hundreds of times. After departing from Fresh, Rick recorded "Children's Story" as one of the first tracks for his debut album. He chose to use a piano interpolation of the bassline of Bob James' 1974 instrumental "Nautilus" due to its appeal in urban communities and outdoor performances.

Commercially, "Children's Story" was a top five hit on the US Billboard Hot R&B/Hip-Hop Songs chart. It was also a top 40 hit on the US Dance Singles Sales and Dance Club Songs charts, and for Cashbox, appeared on the top 30 of the Top R&B Singles chart. The song received compliments for storytelling and went on to be sampled and interpolated more than 600 times, making Slick Rick one of the most sampled music artists in hip-hop. Music artists who sampled the song include Montell Jordan, Eminem and Dr. Dre, Nas, and Vince Staples, while those who made their own version of "Children's Story" include Black Star, Everlast, Tricky, the Game, and Black Rob.

== Background ==
Ricky Walters, known as Slick Rick, lived in the south London suburb of Mitcham in the first eleven years of his life. When he was eighteen months old, one of his eyes was injured by a shard of glass from a broken window, which inspired the decision to wear his signature eyepatch. He later moved to Manhattan, New York at the age of eleven, living in Manhattan.

Rick received attention from the hip-hop community when he collaborated with beatboxer Doug E. Fresh on the double-A sided 1985 single "The Show" and "La Di Da Di". Both songs went on to be sampled hundreds of times, with "La Di Da Di" becoming a worldwide hit and Rick being the third artist signed to Def Jam Recordings. Shortly after the single's release, Rick departed from Fresh mainly due to wage issues.

== Music and lyrics ==
"Children's Story"
The structure of "Children's Story" is in the form of a morality tale, where a 17-year-old boy falls into the life of crime.

"Children's Story" uses a piano interpolation of the bassline of Bob James' 1974 instrumental "Nautilus". In a 2018 interview with Rolling Stone, Rick explained that he chose to interpolate the song due to its "gritty city edge", noting its popularity in urban communities and association with outdoor performances by hip-hop groups including the Cold Crush Brothers and Grandmaster Flash and the Furious Five. After developing the beat, Rick began working on the lyrics. "Children's Story" was one of the first songs Rick worked on for his debut album The Great Adventures of Slick Rick.

The concept of the song is a morality tale disguised as a "nursery rhyme" that concludes in several shootings. The song contains a running time of about four minutes with no chorus. With a cool, laid-back approach, Rick offers to tell a couple of kids a bedtime story. He uses his British accent as he begins "Children's Story" with a fairy tale intro that starts innocently: "Once upon a time not long ago/When people wore pajamas and lived life slow").

As the song progresses, a 17-year-old boy (the subject) falls into the life of crime, in which he starts an armed robbery and points a gun at a pregnant woman before holding her hostage. In addition, a "dope fiend" produces a shotgun, with a child ultimately getting shot by police. The song's turning point occurs when one of the 17-year-old boy's victims turns out to be an undercover cop, which leads to the former's death in the streets.

== Release and commercial success ==
"Children's Story" was first released as the third track of The Great Adventures of Slick Rick, which was released on November 1, 1988. Although Rick wanted the song to be the first single of his album, Def Jam chose to release "Teenage Love" first. As a result, "Children's Story" was released as the second single from the album on April 4, 1989, through Def Jam and Columbia Records.

Commercially, "Children's Story" peaked at number five on the US Hot R&B/Hip-Hop Songs chart on the week of June 3, 1989, remaining on the chart for nineteen weeks since its debut on the week of April 1. It also peaked at number 34 on the US Dance Singles Sales chart on the week of June 3, remaining for nine weeks; and peaking at number 39 on the US Dance Club Songs chart on the week of June 10, remaining for four weeks.

For Cashbox, on the week of April 8, 1989, "Children's Story" debuted at number 87 on their Top R&B Singles chart, later peaking at number 25 on the week of May 13. On October 21, 2025, the Recording Industry Association of America (RIAA) certified the song Platinum for selling over 1,000,000 units.

== Critical reception ==
Shortly after the song's release, Los Angeles Times called it "a violent, clever bedtime tale." In 2006, Henry Adaso of LiveAbout ranked it #44 on his list of the "100 Best Rap Songs", stating that it was a "masterfully woven narrative ... by hip-hop's greatest storyteller." In 2025, Complex writer Craig Jenkins ranked "Children's Story" on the top of his "50 Best Storytelling Rap Songs" list.

== Music video ==
A music video was made for the song, which showed a more playful vibe in contrast to the dark themes of "Children's Story". Rick's record label prioritized a lighter tone so they could present it to a broader audience. When asked by Rolling Stone on how he felt about the music video, he answered that he wasn't really enthusiastic about it, though he acknowledged that he was happy to make music videos and establish himself in the music industry at the time.

Rick suggested that the music video's directors were inspired by the Keystone Cops, but said that he didn't want to criticize their creative decision, although viewers would have preferred a grittier visual style that connected to the lyrics and themes of "Children's Story". Rick recalled that the outfits in the music video were influenced by Benetton. At the time, it was a prominent clothing store and brand, which he attributed to his decision to adopt its sweater-based look.

== Legacy ==
=== Sampling and influence ===
Montell Jordan sampled "Children's Story" for his number-one hit "This Is How We Do It".

Following its release, "Children's Story" had been sampled and interpolated over 600 times, making Rick one of the most sampled music artists in hip-hop. When Snoop Dogg did an interview with Spin in October 1993, he considered Rick to be a huge influence on his rapping style. Snoop Dogg used the song as an example of how Rick's use of characters and storytelling influenced his writing. Montell Jordan sampled "Children's Story" for his 1995 number-one hit "This Is How We Do It". Additionally, he utilized altered lyrics of "Children's Story" to more overtly reference the song's origins. Rick couldn't recall when he first heard it but felt honored when Jordan wanted to redo his song. The song attributed to Rick's personal connection with the West Coast.

In 1998, Black Star, notably with Mos Def, adapted "Children's Story" as a subliminal diss aimed at Diddy and his record label Bad Boy Records. Questlove later revealed that when Mos Def performed "Children's Story" a cappella at a live show, the latter didn't know Diddy was in attendance. Eminem and Dr. Dre sampled "Children's Story" in their 1999 song "Bad Guys Always Die". In addition, rappers Everlast, Tricky, the Game, and Black Rob did their own version of the song.

"Children's Story" was included in the Playback FM station in Grand Theft Auto: San Andreas (2004). Nas sampled the song for his 2018 song "Cops Shot the Kid", which also featured a cameo from Rick himself. Upon its release, he complimented how "they mixed it up, made it sound modern." In 2024, rapper Doechii revealed that her track "Denial is a River" was inspired by a journal entry and the chronological flow of the song. In 2026, Vince Staples sampled "Children's Story" for his song "The Big Bad Wolf" in a "scratched and looped" form.

=== Live performances ===
In 2015, Rick and fellow rapper Nas performed "Children's Story" on the former's 50th birthday performance. Nas presented Rick with a large crown-shaped cake prior to the performance. In 2025, Rick made a surprise appearance on Wu-Tang Clan's last performance on their farewell tour at Madison Square Garden in New York City, performing "Children's Story". On July 11, 2026, Rick performed the song during a surprise appearance at Jay-Z's Yankee Stadium concert, along with "The Ruler's Back" (1991) and "La Di Da Di".

=== School controversy ===
In December 2016, from Suffolk, Virginia, John F. Kennedy Middle School received controversy after parent Ashley Ehrhardt reported that her sixth-grade son's substitute teacher handed out a "poem" to students and had them recite lyrics from "Children's Story", including its lyrics about drugs, pointing a gun to a pregnant woman's head, and shooting at police. Ehrhardt stated that it was "not appropriate" for a teacher to have sixth-graders recite and study, questioning whether the school approved the rap lyrics or knew it was being taught in the classroom. The district's public information officer Bethanne Bradshaw issued a statement about the controversy, considering that the assignment was intended to be based on figurative language.

=== Children's book ===
In March 2017, record label and online retailer Get on Down Records announced the re-release of "Children's Story" in the form of an 18-page children's book for Record Store Day, which was released on April 22. The package also included a poster, picture sleeve 7-inch record of "Children's Story" with "The Moment I Feared" as the B-side, and a CD release of The Great Adventures of Slick Rick.

== Personnel ==
Credits are adapted from Tidal.

- Ricky Walters – vocals, writing, production

== Charts ==
Chart (1989)	Peak position
US Hot R&B/Hip-Hop Songs (Billboard)	5
US Dance Club Songs (Billboard)	39
US Dance Singles Sales (Billboard)	34
US Cashbox R&B Singles	25

== Certifications ==
Region	Certification	Certified units/sales
United States (RIAA)	Platinum	1,000,000^{‡}
^{‡} Sales+streaming figures based on certification alone.
