= B.O.B (song) =

2000 song by OutKast

Single by Outkast

from the album Stankonia
- Released: August 29, 2000
- Genre: Alternative hip-hop; experimental hip-hop; drum and bass; big beat; rap rock; dance; Miami bass
- Length: 5:04 (album version); 4:18 (radio edit)
- Label: LaFace; Arista
- Songwriters: André Benjamin; Antwan Patton; David Sheats
- Producer: Earthtone III

Outkast singles chronology
| "Street Talkin'" (1999) | "B.O.B" (2000) | "Ms. Jackson" (2000) |

Music video
- "B.O.B" on YouTube

"B.O.B" ("Bombs Over Baghdad") is a song by the American rap duo Outkast from their fourth studio album Stankonia (2000). It was released as the album's lead single on August 29, 2000, by LaFace Records and Arista Records. Produced by Earthtone III, the song has a high-speed tempo beat consisting of drum and bass rhythms, guitars, organs and gospel vocals. Although not a huge commercial success, the song has been cited as one of the greatest songs of all time by publications such as Pitchfork, Rolling Stone, Blender and Complex. The song gained renewed popularity during the 2003 Iraq War.

== Composition ==
"B.O.B (Bombs Over Baghdad)"
"B.O.B" contains elements of drum and bass music and combines guitars, organs, and gospel vocals, while the duo's raps keep pace with the quick-tempo of the track.

Produced by Outkast and Mr. DJ under the name Earthtone III, "B.O.B" has "jittery drum'n'bass rhythms" and has been classified as a "stylistic tour de force" combining "Hendrix-ian" guitars, organs, and gospel vocals. On the track, André 3000 and Big Boi employ a "frantic" flow in order to keep pace with the song's high-speed tempo, which runs at 155 beats per minute.

Big Boi said that they wanted to differ from current music. "Everybody's been doing music like they all have the same formula — e = mc^{2}. They get a beat, an MC, somebody to sing the hook, and go platinum. Where's music going to go when everybody's trapped in this same repetitious flow?"

== Release ==
In addition to the regular release, there is also a clean version available in the video game Mat Hoffman's Pro BMX, which removed expletives such as "hell" and references to recreational drug use to allow the game to receive an "E for Everyone" rating.

== Reception ==
"B.O.B" peaked at number 69 on the US Billboard R&B/Hip-Hop Songs chart and number 61 on the UK Singles Chart. However, many urban Top 40 radio stations banned the single because of its title and the subject matter that it was assumed to have. The single was named by several music publications as one of the best songs of the 2000s. Rolling Stone ranked it 21st on its "100 Best Songs of the 2000s" list, 50th on its "The 50 Greatest Hip Hop Songs of All Time" list and 39th on its "500 Greatest Songs of All Time". Pitchfork ranked it first on its "The Top 200 Tracks of the 2000s" list. Bested only by Michael Jackson's "Billie Jean", it was ranked second on Blender's "The 500 Greatest Songs Since You Were Born" list. Complex ranked it third on its "The 100 Best Songs of the 2000s" list. The Ringer and The Guardian both ranked the song number one on their lists of the greatest Outkast songs.

The song received near universal acclaim from music critics. Nathan Brackett of Rolling Stone wrote, "The furious 'B.O.B.' is a blast of up-tempo, turn-of-the-century dislocation with electro breaks and a gospel choir. 'Power music, electric revival,' chants the choir at the end, sounding like some funkified Southern congregation where Chuck D is the preacher and Afrika Bambaataa is the musical director." Louis Arp of Sputnikmusic called the song a "drum 'n bass assault at a frantic pace with perhaps one of the best guitar solos in hip hop history" and identified the duo's "rapid-fire delivery" as "perhaps the most astonishing thing about this track". Tony Green of The Village Voice called it Outkast's "strongest retort to the 'bounce and more bounce' crowd, just about the damnedest bass track ever" and an "electro workout reimagined as a praise-and-worship service". Aishah Hight of PopMatters said that its "fast tempo, complemented by the chant 'Bombs over Baghdad', makes this song edgy, animated, and entertaining". Saron Baker of Yahoo! Music said that it "explodes in revved-up adrenaline".

In 2009, Stuart Berman of Pitchfork named "B.O.B" the best song of the 2000s, writing, "B.O.B. is not just the song of the decade— it is the decade." Pitchfork's review called the song a "fast-forwarded highlight-reel prophecy of what the next 10 years held in store".

== Music video ==
The music video for "B.O.B" was directed by Dave Meyers. Shmoop said it "combines all of your typical elements of a hip-hop music video, namely the girls, the cars, and the bling, except this video is on psychedelics. This is a good point of comparison to see just how much Outkast has changed both musically, artistically, and stylistically over the course of their career."

== Impact ==
The song became increasingly popular during the Iraq War in 2003. Many radio stations increased its airplay and U.S. troops were using it as a battle cry. Both members of Outkast have clarified that they opposed the invasion, with Big Boi wishing that the U.S. government had consulted the United Nations before taking action, further explaining that the half-hearted bombings are a metaphor for lack of dedication in the music industry.

During the 2003 NASDAQ-100 Open, the tennis player Jennifer Capriati requested it to be played.

Iggy Azalea's 2013 single "Work" was inspired by the chord progression in "B.O.B". The single's music video also paid homage to the visual elements of the "B.O.B" music video. Janelle Monáe's "Many Moons" is also influenced by the drum pattern of "B.O.B".

The song was used in the video games Saints Row IV and Mat Hoffman's Pro BMX, and in the movies How High, Head of State and Scoob!.

In October 2020, it was announced that Zack de la Rocha's remix of the song would appear on a 20th-anniversary rerelease of Stankonia later that year. This remix, which was made in fall 2000, was originally released to rock radio. It has also appeared on file-sharing sites as a remix credited to Rage Against the Machine, de la Rocha's band. During Outkast's induction into the Rock and Roll Hall of Fame in November 2025, Tyler, the Creator covered the song as part of a tribute to the duo featuring other artists.

== Track listing ==
US CD single

1. "B.O.B" (radio mix) – 4:18
2. "B.O.B" (instrumental) – 5:05
3. "B.O.B" (callout research hook) – 0:10
4. "B.O.B" (music video) – 3:23

UK DVD single

1. "B.O.B" (video) – 4:26
2. "Ms. Jackson" (video) – 4:18
3. "What Is Stankonia?" – 10:00

Europe CD single

1. "B.O.B" (UK radio edit) – 4:14
2. "B.O.B" (album version) – 5:05
3. "B.O.B" (CD-ROM video) – 4:26

US vinyl single
Side A

1. "B.O.B" (radio mix) – 4:18
2. "B.O.B" (instrumental) – 5:05

Side B

1. "B.O.B" (club mix) – 5:04
2. "B.O.B" (a cappella) – 2:58

UK vinyl single

A "B.O.B" (album version) – 5:05
B "B.O.B" (instrumental) – 5:05

Europe enhanced CD single

1. "B.O.B" (UK radio edit) – 3:42
2. "B.O.B" (album version) – 5:05
3. "B.O.B" (enhanced video) – 4:26

== Credits ==
=== Outkast ===
- André 3000 – vocals, backing vocals
- Big Boi – vocals

=== Other Personnel ===
- Morris Brown College Gospel Choir – backing vocals
- Earthtone III – keyboards, producer, arranger
- Kennet Wright – keyboards
- Matt Still – keyboards
- Nein H. Pogue – arranger
- David Whild – guitar solo
- Donny Mathis – guitar
- Cutmaster Swiff – cuts

== Charts ==
=== Weekly charts ===
| Chart (2000) | Peak position |
|---|---|
| UK Singles (OCC) | 61 |
| UK Hip Hop/R&B (Official Charts) | 9 |
| US Hot R&B/Hip-Hop Songs (Billboard) | 69 |

=== Year-end charts ===
| Chart (2001) | Position |
|---|---|
| Canada (Nielsen SoundScan) | 84 |

== Certifications ==
| Region | Certification | Certified units/sales |
|---|---|---|
| New Zealand (RMNZ) | Gold | 15,000^{‡} |
| United States (RIAA) | Platinum | 1,000,000^{‡} |
^{‡} Sales+streaming figures based on certification alone.

== Release history ==
| Region | Date | Format(s) | Label(s) | Ref(s). |
|---|---|---|---|---|
| United States | August 29, 2000 | Rhythmic contemporary; urban radio | LaFace; Arista | |
| United Kingdom | December 11, 2000 | 12-inch vinyl; CD | LaFace; Arista | |

== See also ==
- List of anti-war songs
