= Street Talkin' =

1999 single by Slick Rick featuring Outkast

Single by Slick Rick featuring OutKast

from the album The Art of Storytelling
- Released: September 4, 1999
- Recorded: 1998
- Genre: Hip hop
- Length: 3:41
- Label: Def Jam Recordings
- Songwriters: Ricky Walters, Antwan Patton
- Producer: Jazze Pha

Slick Rick singles chronology
"Da Art of Storytellin' (Pt. 1)" (1999)	"Street Talkin'" (1999)	"Hip Hop Police" (2007)

Outkast singles chronology
"Da Art of Storytellin' (Pt. 1)" (1999)	"Street Talkin'" (1999)	"B.O.B" (2000)

"Street Talkin'" is the only single released from Slick Rick's fourth album, The Art of Storytelling. It was released in 1999 and produced by Jazze Pha. It also features a verse from Big Boi of Outkast and a music video was released along with the single in 1999. The song peaked at #65 on the Hot R&B/Hip-Hop songs chart and #22 on the Hot Rap Tracks.

== Uses ==
- In March 2021, the song was featured in Last Chance U: Basketball, in the first season's first episode "The Window".

== Charts ==
Chart (1999)	Peak position
US Hot R&B/Hip-Hop Songs (Billboard)	65
US Hot Rap Songs (Billboard)	22
