= Behind Bars (Slick Rick song) =

Single by Slick Rick

from the album Behind Bars
- B-side: "Behind Bars (Remix)"
- Released: November 8, 1994
- Recorded: 1994
- Genre: Hip hop
- Length: 3:24
- Label: Def Jam Recordings
- Songwriter: Ricky Walters
- Producers: Epitome Of Scratch, Warren G

Slick Rick singles chronology
"It's a Boy" (1991)	"Behind Bars" (1994)	"Sittin' in My Car" (1995)

Music video
- "Behind Bars" on YouTube

"Behind Bars" is the first single released from Slick Rick's third album, Behind Bars. It was released on November 8, 1994. The single was released while Rick was still in jail and featured an entirely animated music video for the remix that was produced by Warren G (who also contributed a verse on one of his mixes); the music video was animated and directed by Sash Andranikian. "Behind Bars" became Slick Rick's first and only single to reach the Billboard Hot 100, peaking at 87 on the chart, the song also made it to 63 on the Hot R&B/Hip-Hop Songs and 12 on the Hot Rap Singles.

== Single track listing ==
=== A-Side ===
1. "Behind Bars" (Dum Ditty Dum Mix) - 3:21
2. "Behind Bars" (Dum Ditty Dum Mix) - 3:21 (Featuring Warren G)

=== B-Side ===
1. "Behind Bars" (LP Version) - 3:24
2. "Behind Bars" (Dum Ditty Dum Instrumental) - 3:21

== Charts ==
Chart (1994)	Peak position
US Billboard Hot 100	87
US Billboard Hot Black Singles	63
US Billboard Hot Rap Singles	12
