= I Shouldn't Have Done It =

Single by Slick Rick

from the album The Ruler's Back
- B-side: "I Shouldn't Have Done It"
- Released: November 6, 1990
- Recorded: 1990
- Genre: Hip hop
- Length: 4:05
- Label: Def Jam; Columbia
- Songwriter: Ricky Walters
- Producer: Vance Wright

Slick Rick singles chronology
"Hey Young World" (1989)	"I Shouldn't Have Done It" (1990)	"Mistakes of a Woman in Love with Other Men" (1991)

Music video
- "I Shouldn't Have Done It" on YouTube

"I Shouldn't Have Done It" is the first single released from Slick Rick's second album, The Ruler's Back. It was released on June 6, 1991, by Def Jam Recordings with production from Vance Wright and lyrics written by Slick Rick. It would be the most successful single from the album, being the only one of five singles to make it to the Billboard charts. It reached number fifty on the Hot R&B Singles chart and number two on the Hot Rap Singles chart.

The music video was very low-budget and mostly involved close-ups of Slick Rick rapping and others dancing. A goof occurs in the video when a female dancer's earring falls off, but she carries on.

The single was used in the soundtrack for the motion picture Livin' Large!, and clips from the film was used in the music video for the song.

== Track listing ==
=== A-side ===
1. "I Shouldn't Have Done It" (Extended Mix)- 4:05
2. "I Shouldn't Have Done It" (Radio Edit)- 3:08

=== B-side ===
1. "I Shouldn't Have Done It" (Instrumental)- 4:06
2. "I Shouldn't Have Done It" (A Cappella)- 3:08

== Charts ==
Chart (1990–1991)	Peak position
US Billboard Hot Black Singles	50
US Billboard Hot Rap Singles	2
