= Teenage Love (song) =

Single by Slick Rick

from the album The Great Adventures of Slick Rick
- B-side: "Treat Her Like a Prostitute"
- Released: November 1988
- Recorded: 1988
- Genre: Hip hop
- Length: 4:53
- Label: Def Jam; Columbia
- Songwriter(s): Ricky Walters
- Producer(s): Slick Rick; The Bomb Squad

Slick Rick singles chronology
"Teenage Love" (1988)	"Children's Story" (1989)

Music video
- "Teenage Love" on YouTube

"Teenage Love" is the first single released from Slick Rick's 1988 debut album, The Great Adventures of Slick Rick. It was released in November 1988 as his debut single and was produced by Slick Rick and The Bomb Squad. "Teenage Love" would prove to be a hit for Slick Rick, making it to number 16 on the Hot Black Singles chart and number 8 on the Hot Rap Singles. It wasn't as successful as the next single, "Children's Story", released the following year.

== Reception ==
Writing for the Los Angeles Times, music journalist Soren Baker stated that the song "deftly blended social commentary, self-examination and unparalleled arrogance." Jesse Ducker of Albumism praised the single, stating that it "is filled with insights into how teenagers deal with relationships, including their eventual dissolution."

== Track listing ==
A-side

1. "Teenage Love" – 4:48
2. "Teenage Love" (dub) – 4:40

B-side

1. "Treat Her Like a Prostitute" (album version) – 3:54
2. "Treat Her Like a Prostitute" (movie version) – 3:34

== Charts ==
Chart (1989)	Peak position
US Hot R&B/Hip-Hop Songs (Billboard)	16
US Hot Rap Songs (Billboard)	8
