= Behind Bars: The World's Toughest Prisons =

- Genre: Documentary
- Directed by: Florian Fielder; Daniel Koschera; Sina Hutt; Daniel Lange
- Countries of origin: Germany; United States
- Original language: English
- No. of series: 4
- No. of episodes: 19

Production
- Producer: Christian Schene
- Running time: 48 minutes
- Production company: Maximus

Original release
- Network: Amazon Prime Video; Discovery Channel; Viasat World
- Release: 18 September 2016 – 17 April 2024

Behind Bars The World's Toughest Prisons is a German-made American documentary series about life and the day-to-day operations of supermax prisons. Each episode features a different prison in a different part of the world.

Initially released on Amazon Prime Video, it was sold to Viasat World for season 2.
