= Nautilus (instrumental) =

Song by Bob James

from the album One
- Released: 1974
- Genre: Smooth jazz, jazz fusion
- Length: 5:08
- Label: CTI Records
- Songwriter: Bob James
- Producer: Creed Taylor

"Nautilus" is the sixth and final track on the 1974 album One, by American jazz keyboardist Bob James.

== Background and recording ==
"Nautilus" was recorded in 1974 at Van Gelder Studio in Englewood Cliffs, New Jersey, under the production of Creed Taylor, founder of CTI Records. The track's title was inspired by Taylor, who noted that the song's deep, resonant tones and fluid keyboard lines evoked the sound of a submarine submerging into the ocean. Bob James composed the piece, drawing on his blend of jazz, funk, and soul influences, which characterized much of his work during the 1970s.

The recording features Bob James' distinctive Fender Rhodes electric piano, layered with atmospheric synthesizer textures, creating a hypnotic and groove-heavy sound.

== Legacy ==
"Nautilus" is widely recognized as one of the most influential tracks in jazz and hip-hop. It is said to be one of the most sampled tracks in hip-hop history. Music database WhoSampled reports "Nautilus" has been sampled in over 410 songs as of 2025.

The first sampling of "Nautilus" is believed to be by Ultramagnetic MCs (“Bait”, 1986). Other artists who have sampled "Nautilus" include Run-DMC ("Beats to the Rhyme," 1988), A Tribe Called Quest ("Clap Your Hands," 1993), and Naughty by Nature ("O.P.P.," 1991).

== Personnel ==
- Bob James (keyboards)
- Gary King (bass)
- Idris Muhammad (drums)
