= Victory (Slick Rick album) =

Studio album by Slick Rick
- Released: June 13, 2025
- Genre: Hip-hop
- Length: 27:13
- Labels: 7Wallace; Mass Appeal
- Producers: Dirty Harry; Mandy Aragones; Martin Ikin; M. Rodriguez; Parker Ighile; Pro Logic; Q-Tip; Rory Taylor; Show N Prove; Slick Rick; Troy White

Slick Rick chronology
The Art of Storytelling (1999)	Victory (2025)

Legend Has It... chronology
Victory (2025)	The Emperor's New Clothes (2025)

Victory is the fifth studio album by American rapper Slick Rick. It was released on June 13, 2025, through 7Wallace Music and Mass Appeal Records. Victory was Rick's first album since 1999's The Art of Storytelling, as well as the first album in Mass Appeal's "Legend Has It..." series, in which seven albums by Golden Age East Coast rappers were released during the span of 2025. It features guest appearances from Giggs and Nas.

== Background ==
On April 16, 2025, Mass Appeal Records announced a series titled "Legend Has It...", which features seven albums set to be released in 2025, from Nas & DJ Premier, Ghostface Killah, Raekwon, Mobb Deep, De La Soul, Big L, plus one "guest of honour", which later turned out to be Slick Rick.

== Reception ==
Professional ratings
Review scores
Source	Rating
Pitchfork	6.7/10
Rolling Stone	3/5 stars
Spectrum Culture	45%
Tom Hull – on the Web	B+

Pitchfork rated the album 6.7 out of ten and described it as "a short, stylish legacy album born out of boredom and an apparent itch to jog the memories of anyone who might've forgotten that this rap thing wouldn't be the same without MC Ricky D."

Rolling Stone assigned it three stars, noting it "resembles a visual album akin to Beyoncé's Lemonade, but without that piece's poetic reflections on Black identity and culture."

It was given a score of 45 percent by Spectrum Culture, which remarked, "Despite one outlandish and provocative track, this album from a hip hop legend feels like a perfunctory lifetime achievement award given by the artist himself."

Stereogum gave a positive review, calling Victory "a worthwhile adventure—even with some lame detours." Reviewer Peter A. Berry praised Slick Rick's enduring wit and delivery, writing that the album "sees Slick Rick in cruise control of all his preternatural gifts" and that tracks like "Documents" showcase "two masters of their realm" in Rick and Nas. Berry noted, however, that the interludes "oscillate between self-serious and just flat-out shallow", slowing the album's momentum.

== Track listing ==
Victory track listing
No.	Title	Writer(s)	Producer(s)	Length
1.	"Victory Intro"	Richard Walters	Mandy Aragones	0:23
2.	"Stress" (featuring Giggs)	Walters; Nathaniel Thompson	Slick Rick; Parker Ighile	2:38
3.	"Angelic"	Walters	Slick Rick; Parker Ighile; Dirty Harry	2:40
4.	"Foreign"	Walters	Slick Rick; Rory Taylor	1:42
5.	"I Did That"	Walters	Mandy Aragones	1:42
6.	"Come One Let's Go"	Walters	Slick Rick; M. Rodriguez	1:51
7.	"Landlord"	Walters	Slick Rick	3:44
8.	"Mother Teresa"	Walters	Slick Rick	0:27
9.	"Spirit to Cry"	Walters	Slick Rick; Pro Logic; Troy White; Parker Ighile	1:54
10.	"Documents" (featuring Nas)	Woods; Nasir Jones	Slick Rick; Parker Ighile	2:49
11.	"So You're Having My Baby"	Walters	Slick Rick; Rory Taylor	1:57
12.	"Cuz I'm Here"	Walters	Slick Rick; Martin Ikin	2:04
13.	"Matrix"	Walters	Slick Rick	0:12
14.	"We're Not Losing"	Walters	Show N Prove; Slick Rick	1:31
15.	"Another Great Adventure"	Walters; Kamaal Fareed	Q-Tip; Slick Rick	1:33
Total length:				27:13
