= Behind Bars (Slick Rick album) =

Studio album by Slick Rick
- Released: November 22, 1994
- Recorded: 1993–94
- Genre: Hip hop
- Length: 40:14
- Label: Def Jam
- Producers: Slick Rick; the Epitome of Scratch; Easy Mo Bee; Warren G; Pete Rock; Large Professor; Vance Wright

Slick Rick chronology
The Ruler's Back (1991)	Behind Bars (1994)	The Art of Storytelling (1999)

Singles from Behind Bars
- 1. "Behind Bars" Released: November 8, 1994; 2. "Sittin' in My Car" Released: February 14, 1995

Behind Bars is the third studio album by the British-American rapper Slick Rick, released in 1994 on Def Jam Recordings.

Behind Bars peaked at number 51 on the Billboard 200, and number 11 on the Top R&B/Hip-Hop Albums chart. The album spawned two singles, "Behind Bars" and "Sittin' in My Car", which made it to number 12 and number 11 on the Hot Rap Singles, respectively.

== Production ==
The album contains production from Vance Wright, Pete Rock, Large Professor, Easy Mo Bee, and Warren G. Doug E. Fresh, Nice & Smooth, and Warren G make guest appearances on a few tracks. Like The Ruler's Back, Rick recorded the album while on furlough from prison, and the music was constructed around his vocals—on some tracks, years after being recorded. Part of the album was also recorded during a 1993 work release period.

== Critical reception ==
Professional ratings
Review scores
Source	Rating
AllMusic	2/5 stars
Chicago Sun-Times	2/4 stars
Robert Christgau	(choice cut)
The Cincinnati Post	B+
The Encyclopedia of Popular Music	3/5 stars
Entertainment Weekly	B
(The New) Rolling Stone Album Guide	2/5 stars
The Source	3/5 stars
Spin Alternative Record Guide	7/10
USA Today	3/4 stars

Trouser Press wrote that the album "touches on the live-from-inside chill of an Iceberg Slim novel in the title track, but otherwise doesn’t mention [Rick's incarceration] ... Rick doesn’t seem very connected to the music, but his complaints ring with the rancid air of preoccupation by someone with too much time to obsess about his frustrations." Vibe thought that "Rick's legendary street brilliance and sparkling, charming wit can even be distilled from behind bars." The Independent praised Rick's "worldly, laconic delivery and freewheeling, unexpurgated tales of everyday B-boy tribulations." The Spin Alternative Record Guide opined: "When the fantasy and reality collapse into one another ... the effect is a hip-hop revelation, opening a new space in the black male autobiographical narrative."

== Track listing ==
No.	Title	Writer(s)	Producer(s)	Length
1.	"Behind Bars"	Ricky Walters; Paul Huston	Paul Huston; Epitome of Scratch (remix)	3:25
2.	"All Alone (No One to Be With)"	Walters; Vance Wright	Vance Wright	4:05
3.	"Sittin' in My Car" (featuring Doug E. Fresh)	Walters; Wright; William Stewart	Wright	3:47
4.	"A Love That's True (Part I)"	Walters	Ricky Walters	3:55
5.	"Cuz It's Wrong"	Walters; Osten Harvey; Tom Baird; Wesley Henderson; Lynn Henderson	Easy Mo Bee	3:23
6.	"Let's All Get Down" (featuring Nice & Smooth)	Darryl Barnes; Greg Mays; Walters	Greg Nice	3:41
7.	"I'm Captive"	Walters; Wright; Allen Toussaint	Wright; Pete Rock (remix)	4:11
8.	"Get a Job"	Walters; Wright	Wright; Rock (remix)	4:03
9.	"A Love That's True (Part II)"	Walters	Walters	2:20
10.	"It's a Boy (Remix)"	Walters; Wright	Wright; Large Professor (remix)	4:01
11.	"Behind Bars (Dum Ditty Dum Mix)" (featuring Warren G)	Huston; Les McCann	Huston; Warren G (remix)	3:22

Sample credits

- "Sittin' in My Car" contains a sample of "Sitting in the Park", written and performed by Billy Stewart.
- "Cuz It's Wrong" contains an interpolation of "In Bed", written by Tom Baird, Wesley Henderson, and Lynn Henderson.
- "I'm Captive" embodies portions of the compositions:
  - "Get Out of My Life", written by Allen Toussaint, performed by Wilmer & the Dukes.
  - "Peter Piper", written by Joseph Simmons and Darryl McDaniels, performed by Run-DMC.
- "Get a Job" contains a sample of "Soul Lover", written by Jerry Murray, performed by Jerry-O.
- "Behind Bars (Dum Ditty Dum Mix)" contains a sample of "Sometimes I Cry", written and performed by Les McCann.

== Personnel ==
- Slick Rick - performer, producer
- Warren G - performer, producer, remixing
- Nice & Smooth - performer, producer
- Doug E. Fresh - performer
- Vance Wright - producer
- Prince Paul - producer
- Pete Rock - producer, remixing
- Large Professor - producer, remixing
- Easy Mo Bee - producer
- Al "Purple" Hayes - bass
- Joe Quinde - engineer, mixing, mixing engineer
- Yianni Papadopoulos - engineer, mixing
- Darroll Gustamachio - engineer
- Doug Wilson - engineer
- Mike Glowik - assistant engineer, mixing assistant
- Leroy Southwell - assistant engineer
- Rich July - remixing, mixing, mixing engineer
- Djinji Brown - remixing, mixing engineer
- Greg Geitzenauer - remixing, mixing engineer
- Epitome of Scratch - remixing

== Charts ==
=== Weekly charts ===
Chart (1994)	Peak position
US Billboard 200	51
US Top R&B/Hip-Hop Albums (Billboard)	11

=== Year-end charts ===
Chart (1995)	Position
US Top R&B/Hip-Hop Albums (Billboard)	64
