= The Ruler's Back =

Studio album by Slick Rick
- Released: July 2, 1991
- Recorded: 1990–91
- Genre: Hip hop
- Length: 45:55
- Labels: Def Jam; Columbia
- Producers: Vance Wright; Slick Rick; Mr. Lee

Slick Rick chronology
The Great Adventures of Slick Rick (1988)	The Ruler's Back (1991)	Behind Bars (1994)

Singles from The Ruler's Back
- 1. "I Shouldn't Have Done It" Released: November 6, 1990; 2. "Mistakes of a Woman in Love with Other Men" Released: June 1991; 3. "It's a Boy" Released: November 21, 1991

The Ruler's Back is the second studio album by British-American rapper Slick Rick, released in 1991 on Def Jam Recordings.

The Ruler's Back achieved notable chart success, peaking at number 29 on the Billboard 200, and number 18 on the Top R&B/Hip-Hop Albums chart. The album features the hit single "I Shouldn't Have Done It", which peaked at number 2 on the Hot Rap Singles.

== Production ==
The album contains production from Vance Wright, Slick Rick and Mr. Lee. The Ruler's Back was recorded in three weeks, while Rick was on bail before starting a jail sentence that would end in 1996.

== Critical reception ==
Professional ratings
Review scores
Source	Rating
AllMusic	4/5 stars
Robert Christgau	A−
The Encyclopedia of Popular Music	2/5 stars
Entertainment Weekly	B
Los Angeles Times	4/5 stars
(The New) Rolling Stone Album Guide	3.5/5 stars
Spin Alternative Record Guide	5/10

The Los Angeles Times wrote that "there’s the eerie feeling that you’ve experienced something but you’re not sure what, as you might after reading a Denis Johnson novel or seeing an old Cocteau film late at night on public TV. The Ruler’s Back moves along at the speed of thought." Trouser Press called the album Rick's "most entertaining and least offensive longplayer." The Washington Post called the album "disappointing," writing that "for some reason, Rick has adopted a high-speed rapping style that undercuts his two great strengths -- humor and storytelling grace."

== Track listing ==
All tracks are written by Ricky Walters and Vance Wright, except where noted.

The Ruler's Back track listing
No.	Title	Writer(s)	Producer	Length
1.	"King"		Vance Wright; Slick Rick	3:42
2.	"I Shouldn't Have Done It"		Wright	4:05
3.	"Bond"		Wright	2:53
4.	"Moses"		Wright; Slick Rick	4:04
5.	"Tonto"		Wright; Slick Rick	3:17
6.	"Mistakes of a Woman in Love with Other Men"		Wright; Slick Rick	4:08
7.	"Venus"	Wright; Walters; Ed Marshall	Wright	3:45
8.	"Ship"		Wright; Slick Rick	3:05
9.	"It's a Boy"		Wright	3:29
10.	"Top Cat"		Wright; Slick Rick	3:23
11.	"Runaway"	Walters	Slick Rick; Wright	3:49
12.	"Slick Rick – The Ruler"	Lee Haggard; Walters	Mr. Lee	6:06

== Samples ==
- "I Shouldn't Have Done It"
  - "The New Rap Language" by Spoonie Gee and the Treacherous Three
  - "La Di Da Di" by Doug E. Fresh and Slick Rick
  - "Think (About It)" by Lyn Collins
- "It's a Boy"
  - "Impeach the President" by the Honey Drippers
  - "Mister Magic" by Grover Washington, Jr.
- "King"
  - "Uphill Peace of Mind" by Kid Dynamite
  - "La Di Da Di" by Doug E. Fresh and Slick Rick
  - "The Ruler's Back" by Slick Rick
  - "King of Rock" by Run-DMC
- "Mistakes of a Woman in Love with Other Men"
  - "Double Barrel" by Dave & Ansel Collins
  - "Think (About It)" by Lyn Collins
  - "I'm Broken Hearted" by James Brown
- "Moses"
  - "Sunday Coming" by Alton Ellis
  - "Impeach the President" by the Honey Drippers
  - "Different Strokes" by Syl Johnson
- "Bond"
  - "Sing a Simple Song" by Please
  - "Bring the Noise" by Public Enemy
  - "Stoned Out of My Mind" by the Chi-Lites
  - "Theme from the Planets" by Dexter Wansel
  - "Do the Funky Penguin" by Rufus Thomas
  - "Kool Is Back" by Funk, Inc.
- "Runaway"
  - "Think (About It)" by Lyn Collins
  - "The Show" by Doug E. Fresh, Slick Rick and the Get Fresh Crew
- "Ship"
  - "Change the Beat (Female Version)" by Fab 5 Freddy feat. Beside
  - "La Di Da Di" by Doug E. Fresh and Slick Rick
- "Slick Rick - the Ruler"
  - "La Di Da Di" by Doug E. Fresh and Slick Rick
- "Top Cat"
  - "Funky President" by James Brown
  - "Rock Steady" by Aretha Franklin
  - "Don't Worry About It" by Jimmy "Bo" Horne
- "Venus" (1991) sampled
  - "Venus" by Frankie Avalon
  - "Synthetic Substitution" by Melvin Bliss
  - "Bring the Noise" by Public Enemy
  - "La Di Da Di" by Doug E. Fresh and Slick Rick
  - "Change the Beat (Female Version)" by Fab 5 Freddy feat. Beside
  - "Atomic Dog (Extended Version)" by George Clinton

== Personnel ==
- Slick Rick – performer, producer, executive producer
- Vance Wright – producer, executive producer
- Mr. Lee – producer
- Russell Simmons – executive producer
- Francesca Spero – executive producer
- Darroll Gustamachio – engineer, mixing
- Thom Leinbach – engineer, mixing
- Everett Ramos – engineer, mixing
- Rory Young – programming, engineer
- Cey Adams – design
- Jules T. Allen – photography

== Charts ==
Chart performance for The Ruler's Back
Chart (1991)	Peak position
US Billboard 200	29
US Top R&B/Hip-Hop Albums (Billboard)	18
