= La Di Da Di =

1985 song

Single by Doug E. Fresh and MC Ricky D
- Released: November 21, 2025; 1985 (original promo single)
- Recorded: 1984
- Genre: New school hip hop; beatboxing
- Length: 4:31; 4:58 (original version)
- Label: Fat Beats; Reality/Fantasy (original promo single)
- Songwriters: Douglas Davis; Richard Walters
- Producers: Dennis Bell & Ollie Cotton (City Slicker Productions)

1985 Promotional release

"La Di Da Di" is a song performed by Doug E. Fresh, who provides the beatboxed instrumental, and MC Ricky D (later known as Slick Rick), who performs the vocals. It was released on August 13, 1985, as the B-side to "The Show" and later that year as the lead track of a promotional single. In 2025, to mark the 40th anniversary of its original release, "La Di Da Di" was issued commercially for the first time as the lead track. This limited edition was released by Fat Beats on November 21, 2025.

The song has since gained a reputation as an early hip hop classic, and it is one of the most sampled songs in history.

It was inducted into the National Recording Registry by the Library of Congress in April 2024.

== Content ==
"La Di Da Di" is a light-hearted party song wherein MC Ricky D (Slick Rick) tells a seemingly autobiographical story of a typical day in which he wakes up, bathes, gets dressed, and upon leaving his apartment is accosted by a female love interest, and then by her mother.

== Different edits ==
There are two releases of the song. The original vinyl and cassette versions contain sung lyrics from "Sukiyaki" by A Taste of Honey, but due to a lack of clearance, CD versions are missing the following [slightly modified] refrains in the middle of the song:

"It's all because of you, I'm feelin' sad and blue
You went away, now my life is [filled with] rainy day[s]
[And] I love you so, how much you'll never know
'Cause you took your love away from me"

== Snoop Doggy Dogg cover ==
"Lodi Dodi"

Song by Snoop Doggy Dogg featuring Nanci Fletcher

from the album Doggystyle
- Released: November 23, 1993
- Genre: West Coast hip-hop; gangsta rap; G-funk
- Length: 4:24
- Label: Death Row; Interscope
- Songwriters: Calvin Broadus; Douglas Davis; Hachidai Nakamura; Ei Rokusuke; Ricky Walters
- Producer: Dr. Dre

Snoop Doggy Dogg covered "La Di Da Di" (titled "Lodi Dodi") on his 1993 debut album Doggystyle. An animated music video was released on November 5, 2026, directed by Tristan Zammit.

=== "Lodi Dodi" charts ===
Chart (1994)	Peak position
US Hot 100 Airplay (Billboard)	63
US Rhythmic Airplay (Billboard)	34

== Legacy ==
"La Di Da Di" has gained a reputation for consistently being sampled and referenced by many artists. The line, "Hit it!" for example, has appeared in songs like Rob Base & DJ EZ Rock's "It Takes Two", Ludacris and Mary J. Blige's "Runaway Love," Beastie Boys' "Hold It Now, Hit It," N.W.A.'s "Gangsta Gangsta", Naughty by Nature's "O.P.P.", and Ini Kamoze's "Here Comes the Hotstepper." The line, "We like to party" has appeared in such songs as Vengaboys' "We Like to Party", Miley Cyrus' "We Can't Stop", and Beyoncé's "Party" (not to mention Slick Rick's own later songs “Hey Young World”, "The Ruler's Back", and "Children's Story").

Slick Rick's lyrics have been interpolated in several songs. Namely "Lost Souls" by 2Pac and Outlawz; "Shyne" by Shyne featuring Mashonda; "4 All Y'all" by Conspirituality; "You're Welcome" by Jay-Z and Mary J. Blige.

The following is a list of other songs that referenced "La Di Da Di":

- Gucci Crew II parodied the song in their 1989 song "Fuddy Duddy": "Fuddy duddy, we hates to study. We don't bother people when we eat our Nutty Buddys."
- A Tribe Called Quest sampled the song on their penultimate album The Love Movement on the track "The Love".
- Spice 1's song "Strap on The Side" says the line, La di da di, I shot up his body".
- InI & Pete Rock in their collaborative song "Think Twice" use a line saying "Throw a phat party and invite everybody, and play all the old school hits like La Di Da Di".
- ADOR's song "From the Concrete" says the line, "Slam the child on the hard concrete" in the hook.
- Robbie Williams's song "Rock DJ" borrows the line "and when we rock the mic, we rock the mic" with the high-pitched "right!"
- DJ Premier sampled the song for Big Daddy Kane's song "Show & Prove".
- Rap rock band Hed PE's songs "Crazy Legs" and "Murder" both have references to the song.
- The hook of The Notorious B.I.G.'s song "Hypnotize" interpolates Slick Rick's lyrics: "Ricky Ricky Ricky, can't you see? Somehow your words just hypnotize me, and I just love your jazzy ways, oh MC Rick my love is here to stay", changing them to "Biggie Biggie Biggie, can't you see? Sometimes your words just hypnotize me, and I just love your flashy ways, I guess that's why they're broke and you're so paid."
- Ini Kamoze samples the words "hit it" in his song "Here Comes The Hotstepper".
- Mos Def's song "Perfect Timing" (from True Magic) repeats the line "'cause this type of shit happens every day".
- Jim's Big Ego's song "Feelin' Groovy" contains a rap section, much of which is slightly altered "La Di Da Di" lyrics, including the title.
- The end of the hook of The Black Eyed Peas song "Don't Lie" samples the words "stop lyin'".
- The intro to the Ludacris and Mary J. Blige song "Runaway Love" samples the beginning of "La Di Da Di" by scratching the two words "like this".
- Ludacris's verse on Jennifer Hudson's song "Pocketbook" from her self-titled album: "Baby because tonight is da night/And when we rock upon the mic we rock the mic right".
- Will Smith's song "So Fresh" from his 1999 album Willennium samples this at the end of the song.
- De La Soul samples the word "emcee" in the song "Supa Emcees" on their album Stakes Is High. They also sampled the phrase "I can't be your lover" as a running gag in several tracks on their album De La Soul Is Dead, including their Hip-house parody, "Kicked Out The House". Also on the De La Soul Is Dead album, the phrase "slammed the child on the hard concrete" in the song "My Brother Is A Basehead".
- Pusha T also quotes the phrase "slammed the child on the hard concrete", making it part of the first verse of his song titled "Blocka"—the fourth track of his 2013 mixtape titled Wrath of Caine.
- Kanye West references the song in 2010's GOOD Fridays release "Take One for the Team", which features Pusha T, Keri Hilson and Cyhi the Prynce: "This here a classic like the La Di Da Di verse".
- The intro to the Mary J. Blige song "No One Else" samples the beginning of "La Di Da Di" by sampling the phrase "there is no competition".
- Das EFX samples the words "just some men that's on the mic" in the song "Jussummen" on their album Dead Serious.
- Black Sheep samples the phrase "on and on she kept on" in their song "La Menage", featuring Q-Tip on their album A Wolf in Sheep's Clothing. They also sample the beatboxed, "you know what?" intro (right before the first verse starts) in their song "To Whom It May Concern" on their album A Wolf in Sheep's Clothing.
- Color Me Badd samples the phrase "to the heart, tick tock, you don't stop" in the song "I Wanna Sex You Up" on their album C.M.B.
- Ice Cube paraphrases the song in his track "Stop Snitchin'", singing "Nigga nigga nigga/Can't you see/Somehow your words incarcerate me". He also samples the phrase "Stepped out my house stopped short" in the hook of "Look Who's Burnin", on his album Death Certificate.
- Ice-T's track "Radio Suckers" from the Power album contains a reference to the song in the lyrics: "They bleeped words from Doug's La-Di-Da-Di, I can't get a bleep - What's the deal? Maybe my words are just too real".
- The end of "Millionaire" by Kelis and Andre 3000 samples the phrase "I feel insane"
- Black Thought quotes the song on "Mellow My Man" track on The Roots album Do You Want More?!!!??! by saying: "La Di Da Di, who likes to party? Like Slick Rick the Ruler, I'm cool as a ice brick"
- N.W.A sample the intro part that says 'let it go a little something like this/Hit it!' in their song "Gangsta Gangsta".
- Del the Funky Homosapien samples the line "Went to the bathroom to wash up, Put some soap on my face" in his song "If You Must" from his album Both Sides of the Brain.
- Junior M.A.F.I.A. samples the line "This type of shit it happens everyday" in the chorus to "Player's Anthem".
- Jazmine Sullivan's "Holding You Down (Goin' in Circles)" contains a sample of the line "on and on and on she kept on".
- Mariah Carey samples the word "emcee" in the song "It's Like That".
- Beyoncé samples the song on her "Party" collaboration with André 3000 of her album 4. In 2003, she also used the song's line "You're about witness... before" as a prelude to "Hip Hop Star" during her Dangerously in Love Tour. The performance appeared on the 2004 DVD, Live at Wembley.
- Slick Rick quotes the song title after a line in a Mos Def song ("Auditorium" from The Ecstatic), which features him: "Walk over kicked, one of my fabulous raps (la di da di)".
- DJ Honda samples "La Di Da Di" into "On The Mic", an underground hip-hop posse cut featuring verses from Cuban Link, JuJu, A.L. (All Lyrics) and Missin' Linx (Al' Tariq, Problemz and Black Attack). In addition, Cuban raps "La di da di, we love to party, we always cause trouble when we guzzle Bacardi" in the song's chorus.
- Earl Sweatshirt in the song "Oldie" on The OF Tape Vol. 2 raps "La di da di, back in here to fuck the party up"
- J. Cole borrows a verse and uses the expression "La Di Da Di" in his featured appearance on Beyoncé's "Party".
- Hi-C samples the line "And with your wrinkled pussy, I can't be your lover" in "I'm Not Your Puppet".
- 50 Cent in his song "I'm On It": "La Di Da Di, we like to party".
- Tech N9ne references the song in his song "Dysfunctional": "La di da di, La-di-da-di, I'm at the party, On a drunk night with a punk, might dudes tryin' to pick a fight because he's sorry."
- Miley Cyrus references the song in the chorus of her 2013 single "We Can't Stop": "La da di da di, we like to party..."
- Die Antwoord references the song in their song "Happy Go Sucky Fucky" on their 2014 album Donker Mag: "La di da di, yo we party."
- Tyler the Creator references the song in his song "Deathcamp" on his 2015 album Cherry Bomb: "La-di-da-di, I'm going harder than coming out the closet to conservative Christian fathers."
- Kid Ink references the song in his song "Be Real" on his 2015 album Full Speed: "Roll up good Cali, la di da di."
- Redfoo references the song in his 2013 single "Let's Get Ridiculous": "I'm fresh, I'm slick, I'm la di da di."
- Fun Lovin' Criminals reference the song in Come Find Yourself's "King of New York": "La di da di, free John Gotti, the King of New York, the King of New York!"
- Iggy Azalea also references the line "Ricky, Ricky, Ricky, can't you see, somehow your words just hypnotize me" in her song "Beg For It" featuring MØ changing the lyrics to: "Iggy, Iggy, Iggy, can't you see, that everybody wanna put their hands on me".
- In the Gorillaz's original version of "Clint Eastwood" with Phi Life Cypher, the word "Concrete (concrete, concrete)" is repeated at the end of one verse. This is likely an allusion to the line "Slam the child on the hard concrete" from "La Di Da Di".
- Future referenced the title of the song twice in "King's Dead", which also features Jay Rock, Kendrick Lamar, and James Blake: "La di da di da, slob on me knob...La di da di da, motherfuck the law." His verse also references the track "Slob on My Knob", by Tear Da Club Up Thugs, a side-project of Three 6 Mafia.
- BigBang references the song in their 2008 song "How Gee": "La di da di, we came to party"
- The GD & TOP song "High High" contains a sample of "La Di Da Di"
- Mindless Self Indulgence covered "La Di Da Di" for a bonus track on their 2005 album "You'll Rebel to Anything"
- 2NE1 in their 2010 song "Can't Nobody" references the line: "콧노래 Ladi dadi"
- Atmosphere in their 2001 song "Like Today" Slug says he is "Fresh, dressed like fifty cents" in reference to Slick Rick's "Fresh, dressed like a million bucks."
- Psy references the song in his song "Year of 77 (77학 개론)" on his 2012 EP Psy 6 (Six Rules), Part 1
- BTS references the song in their 2017 song "Mic Drop": "La di da di, 아 너무 바빠."
- Will Smith's beatboxing scene in the film Men in Black II (his beatboxing answer of Booo's answer) samples the beatboxing outro of this song.
- The Coup referenced the line "fresh, dressed, like a million bucks" in their song "Fat Cats, Bigga Fish" from the 1994 album Genocide & Juice.
- Sublime samples the line "I'm feeling sad and blue" in their song "April 29, 1992"
- Onyx sampled the line "So listen close to what we say, because this type of shit happens everyday" to "Just listen up to what I say, the feds get shot daily, everyday" off their song Live Niguz.
- The USA Network reality show Peter Perfect, S2:E7 "Brewing Up Success" (2009), featured a makeover of a children's tea party event space in Ohio called "La Tea Dolly (We Like Tea Party)."
- 100 Gecs referenced the song in the line "la di da di da di, all I wanna do is party" in their song "757" from the 2023 album 10,000 Gecs.
- Nelly references the title of the song and Slick Rick himself during the second verse of his song, "Body on Me" featuring Akon and Ashanti, when he sings "She's slicker than La Di Da Di..."

In 2024, "La Di Da Di" was selected for preservation in the United States National Recording Registry by the Library of Congress as being "culturally, historically, or aesthetically significant".
