= Hey Young World =

Single by Slick Rick

from the album The Great Adventures of Slick Rick
- B-side: "Mona Lisa"
- Released: June 15, 1989
- Recorded: 1988
- Genre: Political hip hop, conscious hip hop
- Length: 4:37
- Label: Def Jam; Columbia
- Songwriter: Ricky Walters
- Producer: Slick Rick

Slick Rick singles chronology
"Children's Story" (1989)	"Hey Young World" (1989)	"I Shouldn't Have Done It" (1990)

Music video
- "Hey Young World" on YouTube

"Hey Young World" is the third single released from Slick Rick's debut album, The Great Adventures of Slick Rick. It was released in 1989 as the follow-up to Slick Rick's popular "Children's Story" and was both written and produced by Slick Rick himself. "Hey Young World" did not reach the same level of success as "Children's Story", reaching number 42 on the Hot Black Singles chart and number 17 on the Hot Rap Singles chart. The B-side contained the popular song, "Mona Lisa".

The song was referenced in Keri Hilson's song "Knock You Down" by guest rapper Kanye West and also in "Pray" by Jay-Z. A sequel of sorts was created by Macy Gray for her album The Id in form of "Hey Young World (Part 2)." It was sampled by TLC for their single "Creep" and by Queen Latifah for her single Just Another Day.... It was also sampled by the Lost Boyz for their single "Love, Peace and Nappiness." The song was also covered instrumentally by jazz trumpeter Wallace Roney on his album Mystikal (2005). The song was also covered on Fashawn's debut album Boy Meets World and was sampled on Kanye West's song No Mistakes

== Track listing ==
=== A-side ===
1. "Hey Young World"- 4:37

=== B-side ===
1. "Mona Lisa"- 4:05

== Charts ==
Chart (1989)	Peak position
US Billboard Hot Black Singles	42
US Billboard Hot Rap Singles	17
