= The Show (Doug E. Fresh song) =

1985 single by Doug E. Fresh & the Get Fresh Crew

Single by Doug E. Fresh & the Get Fresh Crew
- B-side: "La Di Da Di"
- Released: August 13, 1985
- Recorded: 1985
- Genre: Hip hop
- Length: 6:40
- Label: Reality; Fantasy
- Songwriters: Douglas Davis; Richard Walters
- Producers: Dennis Bell and Ollie Cotton; Doug E. Fresh (co.); Teddy Riley

Doug E. Fresh & the Get Fresh Crew singles chronology
"The Original Human Beatbox" (1984)	"The Show" (1985)	"All The Way To Heaven" (1986)

"The Show" is a single by Doug E. Fresh & the Get Fresh Crew. Originally released as a single, the track was later remixed and included on the 1986 Oh, My God! album.

Described as "a reality show of a Hip Hop performance" the track focuses on a conversation between Doug E. Fresh and MC Ricky D (later known as Slick Rick) as they prepare for a show. The song incorporates portions of the melody from the theme song of the animated series Inspector Gadget. The original issue of the song featured a line where Slick Rick mockingly sings a verse from the Beatles' "Michelle" (1965), but all subsequent reissues have removed this line since the rights to the song were never secured.

It sold a million records and was certified gold by the RIAA in 1986.

== Reception ==
"The Show" was named Spin magazine's top rap single of the year, and in Europe (where it received air time on pop music stations such as BBC Radio 1) it broke the record for the best selling rap single of all time. The song peaked at No. 7 on the UK Singles Chart in December 1985 and was #8 on Jet's top 20 for the same month. The record was produced by Dennis Bell & Ollie Cotton for City Slicker Productions.

While one 1985 critic for Spin included the song in a list of "stupid music"—making fun of Doug E. Fresh's lyrics about his shoes, and calling Slick Rick's sendup of "Michelle" "pathetic"—he still concluded that the single is "the shit". Billboard refused to take it seriously, declaring it the "funniest comedy album of the year". Even when it became only the fourth rap single ever to reach gold record status, the same reviewer stated that it only proved that "talk isn't always cheap".

== Legacy ==
The song is featured in New Jack City and CB4, but is not included in the soundtrack album of either film. Chris Rock, who starred in both these films, would later have Slick Rick perform the song live to introduce his HBO special Bigger & Blacker.

In response to the song's popularity, Hurby Azor and his female hip hop group, Super Nature recorded a diss track entitled "The Showstopper". While not a hit in its own right, it did become the breakout track for the group that would later be known as Salt-n-Pepa.

Another diss track entitled "No Show" by The Symbolic Three was released in 1985.

The song is sampled in “Spirit”, another track by Doug E. Fresh which was created for the 1989 soundtrack of Ghostbusters II.

The song is briefly sampled in the song "Oodles of O's" by De La Soul, from their 1991 album De La Soul Is Dead.

Some of the lyrics in this song were interpolated by Snoop Doggy Dogg for the chorus of his 1996 song "Sixx Minutes".

In 1997, The Roots covered the song for the compilation album In tha Beginning...There Was Rap.

The "Six minutes Doug E. Fresh, you're on!" was referenced by Eminem in the song "Remember Me?" from The Marshall Mathers LP (2000) which itself was referenced in the single "Rap God" from the sequel to the same album released in 2013 with the intro featuring Eminem saying "Six minutes Slim Shady, you're on" in the background.

== Charts ==
Chart (1985)	Peak position
Netherlands (Single Top 100)	13
UK Singles (Official Charts)	7
US Hot R&B/Hip-Hop Songs (Billboard)	4

== Certifications ==
Region	Certification	Certified units/sales
United Kingdom (BPI)	Silver	250,000^{^}
United States (RIAA)	Gold	1,000,000^{^}
^{^} Shipments figures based on certification alone.
