= The Great Adventures of Slick Rick =

Studio album by Slick Rick
- Released: November 1, 1988
- Genre: Hip hop
- Length: 49:46
- Labels: Def Jam; Columbia
- Producers: Jam Master Jay; Slick Rick; the Bomb Squad

Slick Rick chronology
The Great Adventures of Slick Rick (1988)	The Ruler's Back (1991)

Singles from The Great Adventures of Slick Rick
- 1. "Teenage Love" Released: November 1988; 2. "Children's Story" Released: April 4, 1989; 3. "Hey Young World" Released: June 15, 1989

The Great Adventures of Slick Rick is the debut studio album by English-American hip hop artist Slick Rick, released on November 1, 1988. Widely considered one of the most influential hip hop albums of all time, it introduced Slick Rick’s distinctive storytelling style, blending humor, vivid narratives, and complex rhymes. The album was a critical and commercial success, and its influence can be seen in generations of rappers who followed.

It topped Billboard's Top R&B/Hip-Hop Albums chart for five nonconsecutive weeks and peaked at number 31 on the Billboard 200.

== Reception ==
Professional ratings
Review scores
Source	Rating
AllMusic	5/5 stars
Mojo	4/5 stars
NME	7/10
Q	4/5 stars
Rolling Stone	2/5 stars
The Rolling Stone Album Guide	4/5 stars
Select	4/5
The Source	5/5 stars
Spin Alternative Record Guide	9/10
The Village Voice	C+

The Philadelphia Inquirer called "Let's Get Crazy" "one of the year's most jolting, exciting pieces of music." The Orange County Register concluded that "Rick's goofy rap style makes him seem less a braggart than a beleaguered Everyman and, with its wickedly sharp production, The Great Adventures of Slick Rick sounds great."

In 1998, The Great Adventures of Slick Rick was selected as one of The Source's "100 Best Albums". The album was retrospectively awarded a perfect "five-mic" score by the magazine in 2002. In 2012, it was ranked at number 99 on Slant Magazine's list of "The 100 Best Albums of the 1980s". In VH1's 2008 ranking of the "100 Greatest Hip Hop Songs", the single "Children's Story" placed at number 61.

Hip hop artist Nas cites The Great Adventures of Slick Rick as one of his favorite albums. In 2009, fellow rapper Busta Rhymes said of the album:

No artist before or since has painted pictures as vividly as Slick Rick did on that album. He embodied what it was to be a superstar: the over-the-top persona, the jewellery, the clothes, his swagger, charisma, attitude. He had that London twang and the mannerisms, but still had the 'hood mentality – the urban, edgy approach. Nobody else had that combination.

== Track listing ==
No.	Title	Writer(s)	Producer(s)	Length
1.	"Treat Her Like a Prostitute"	Ricky Walters	Slick Rick	3:55
2.	"The Ruler's Back"	Ricky Walters	Jam Master Jay	5:38
3.	"Children's Story"	Ricky Walters	Slick Rick	4:02
4.	"The Moment I Feared"	Ricky Walters; Hank Shocklee; Eric Sadler	The Bomb Squad	3:36
5.	"Let's Get Crazy"	Ricky Walters; Hank Shocklee; Eric Sadler	The Bomb Squad	3:51
6.	"Indian Girl (An Adult Story)"	Ricky Walters	Slick Rick	3:17
7.	"Teenage Love"	Ricky Walters; Hank Shocklee; Eric Sadler	The Bomb Squad	4:53
8.	"Mona Lisa"	Ricky Walters	Slick Rick	4:08
9.	"Kit (What's the Scoop)"	Ricky Walters; Hank Shocklee; Eric Sadler	The Bomb Squad	3:22
10.	"Hey Young World"	Ricky Walters	Slick Rick	4:37
11.	"Teacher, Teacher"	Ricky Walters; N. Johnson; Hank Shocklee; Eric Sadler	The Bomb Squad	5:00
12.	"Lick the Balls"	Ricky Walters; Hank Shocklee; Eric Sadler	The Bomb Squad	3:56
Total length:				49:46

Deluxe 30th Anniversary Edition
No.	Title	Length
13.	"Children's Story" (Demo)	2:49
14.	"A Teenage Love" (Demo)	4:17
15.	"Mona Lisa" (Demo)	3:19
16.	"Hey Young World" (Demo)	4:38
17.	"Snakes of the World Today"	2:39

== Personnel ==
- Glen E. Friedman—photography
- Jason Mizell (as Jam Master Jay)—producer
- Jerry Martin—producer
- Eric "Vietnam" Sadler—producer
- Hank Shocklee—producer
- Slick Rick—vocals
- Ricky Walters—producer
- Rick Rubin—executive producer

== Charts ==
=== Weekly charts ===
Chart (1989)	Peak position
US Billboard 200	31
US Top R&B/Hip-Hop Albums (Billboard)	1

=== Year-end charts ===
Chart (1989)	Position
US Billboard 200	70
US Top R&B/Hip-Hop Albums (Billboard)	5

== Certifications ==
Region	Certification	Certified units/sales
United States (RIAA)	Platinum	1,000,000^{^}
^{^} Shipments figures based on certification alone.

== See also ==
- List of number-one R&B albums of 1989 (U.S.)
