= Slick Rick =

British-American rapper and record producer (born 1965)

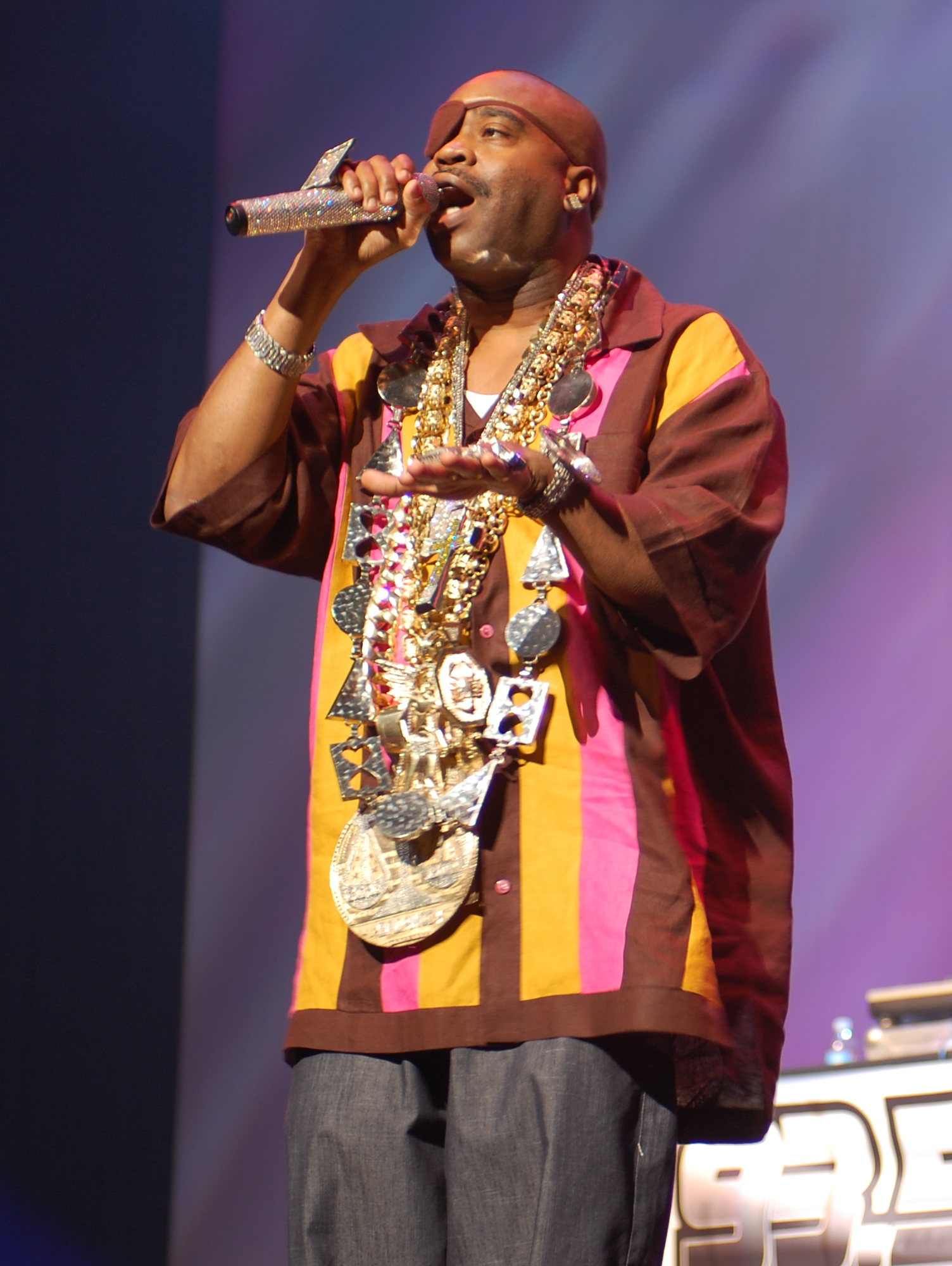
- Slick Rick performing in 2009
- Born: Ricky Martin Lloyd Walters; January 14, 1965 (age 61); London, England
- Other names: Rick the Ruler; MC Ricky D
- Citizenship: United Kingdom; United States
- Occupations: Rapper; songwriter; record producer
- Years active: 1984–present
- Spouse: Mandy Aragones (m. 1997)
- Children: 2
- Musical career
- Origin: New York City, U.S.
- Genre: Hip-hop
- Works: Slick Rick discography
- Labels: Def Jam; Columbia; Mass Appeal; 7Wallace

Ricky Martin Lloyd Walters (born January 14, 1965), known professionally as Slick Rick, is a British and American rapper, songwriter, and record producer based in New York City. He rose to prominence as part of Doug E. Fresh & the Get Fresh Crew in the mid-1980s. His songs "The Show" and "La Di Da Di" are considered early hip-hop classics, and "La Di Da Di" is considered one of the most sampled songs in history.

As Slick Rick, Walters became the third artist to sign with Def Jam Recordings in 1986. He debuted with The Great Adventures of Slick Rick (1988), showcasing his storytelling structure mixed with humor and complex rhymes, including his signature song, "Children's Story".

In 1991, he released The Ruler's Back. The following year, he pleaded guilty to two counts of attempted murder and other charges over a 1990 incident, and was sentenced to five years in prison. While incarcerated, he released Behind Bars in 1994. After being released in 1997, Walters made a comeback with his fourth studio album, The Art of Storytelling (1999). In 2025, he dropped Victory on Mass Appeal Records. A VH1 Hip Hop Honors honoree, About.com ranked Slick Rick No. 12 on its list of the Top 50 MCs of Our Time, while The Source ranked him No. 15 on its list of the Top 50 Lyricists of All Time.

== Early life, family and education ==
Ricky Martin Lloyd Walters was born January 14, 1965, in the southwest London area of Mitcham to Jamaican parents. He was blinded in the right eye by broken glass as an infant, which led him to adopt his signature eye patch in his career. In 1976, when Walters was 11, his family immigrated to the United States, settling in the Baychester area of the Bronx in New York City.

While he attended the Fiorello H. Laguardia High School of Music & Art, Walters majored in visual art and met fellow student Dana Dane. The pair became close friends and formed the Kangol Crew, performing in school contests, parks, and small local clubs. Walters met Doug E. Fresh at a 1984 talent showcase. Fresh was impressed by Walters' talent and made Walters a member of his Get Fresh crew. Fresh's beatbox and Walters' fresh flow turned "The Show"/"La Di Da Di" into international anthems that showcased hip-hop in its early years. Walters became the launching pad for "hip-hop's greatest storyteller."

== Career ==
=== Initial fame (1985–88) ===
Walters' career began in 1985; he first gained success in the rap industry after joining Doug E. Fresh's Get Fresh Crew, using the stage name MC Ricky D. He was featured on the single "The Show" and its even more popular B-side, "La Di Da Di", which featured Walters' rapping over Fresh's beatbox. Both tracks gained some mainstream attention, they appeared on Top of the Pops and Soul Train with the Get Fresh Crew. Reflecting on the single in Rolling Stone magazine, Roots drummer and Tonight Show bandleader Ahmir "Questlove" Thompson said, "Point blank: Slick Rick's voice was the most beautiful thing to happen to hip-hop culture [...] Rick is full of punchlines, wit, melody, cool cadence, confidence and style. He is the blueprint."

In 1986, Walters joined Russell Simmons's Rush Artist Management and became the third artist signed to Def Jam Records, the leading rap/hip-hop label at the time. Collaborating with his friend, DJ Vance Wright, Walters produced his solo debut, The Great Adventures of Slick Rick, which came out in 1988 on Def Jam. The album was very successful, reaching the No. 1 spot on Billboard's R&B/Hip-Hop chart. It also featured four charting singles: "Children's Story", "Mona Lisa", "Hey Young World", and "Teenage Love". The release is known for its storytelling and vocal characterizations. "With the combination of Rick's Dick Van Dyke-on-dope accent and his unique narrative style, the record was an instant classic," wrote critic Matt Weiner. "Each of Rick's songs was an amusing, enthralling story that lasted from the first groove to the last."

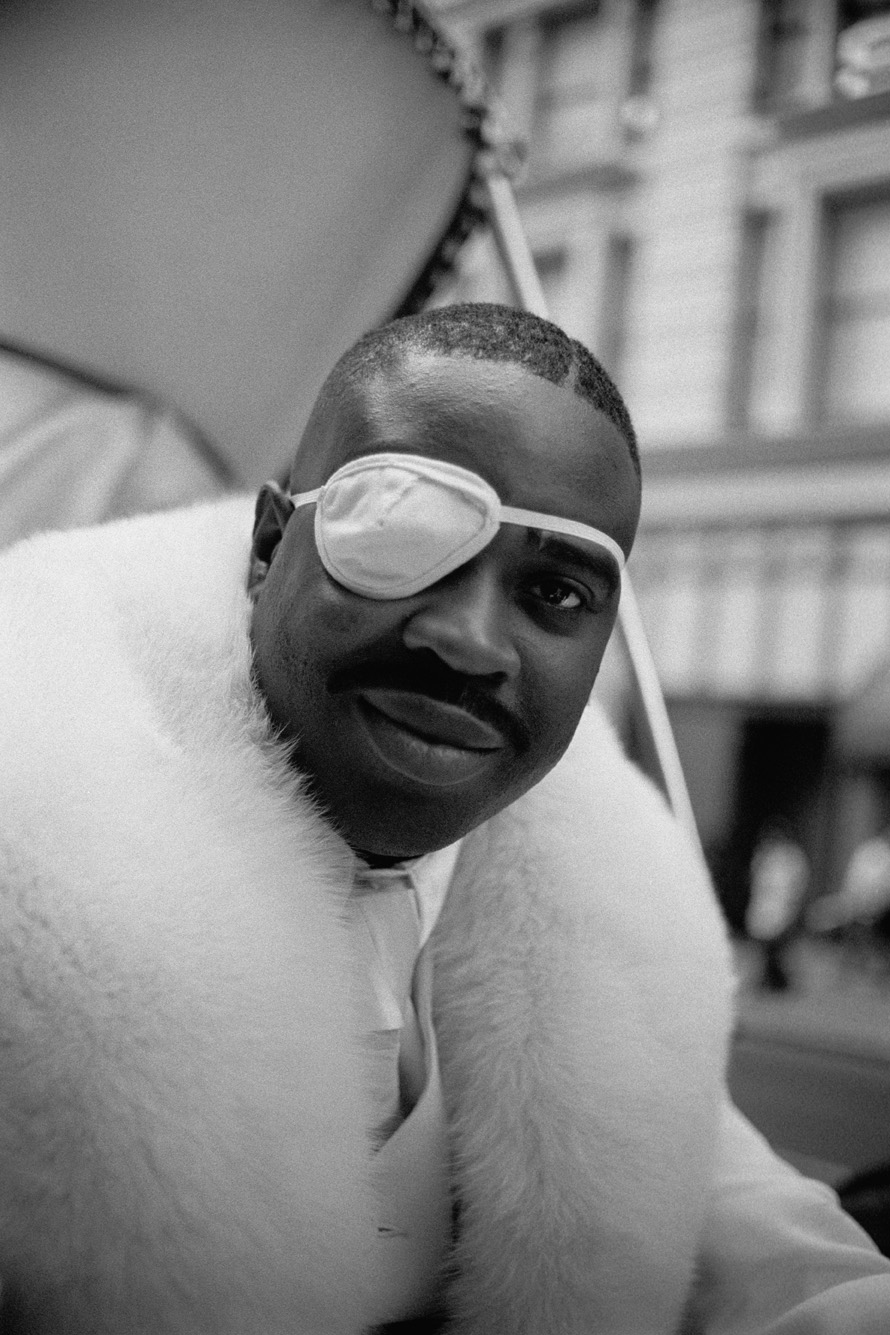
Slick Rick in 1997

=== The Ruler's Back, Behind Bars, and subsequent albums (1989–2018) ===
Walters recorded his second album, The Ruler's Back, released in 1991. Despite peaking at No. 29 on the Billboard Hot 100, the album received mixed reviews and was not as commercially successful as his debut.

Walters' third studio album (the fourth for Def Jam), Behind Bars, was released in 1994 while he was still incarcerated. It was met with lukewarm sales and reviews. Behind Bars peaked at No. 11 on the Billboard Top R&B/Hip-Hop Albums chart, and No. 51 on the Billboard 200.

Walters remained with Def Jam and released a fourth album The Art of Storytelling on May 25, 1999. The comeback album paired him with prolific MCs including Nas, OutKast, Raekwon, and Snoop Dogg. The Los Angeles Times announced it as the "triumphant return of rap's premier yarn-spinner", calling the song "2 Way Street" "a much-needed alternative to rap's misogynistic slant". It charted higher than any of his prior releases: No. 8 on the Billboard 200; and No. 1 on the Top R&B/Hip-Hop Albums chart.

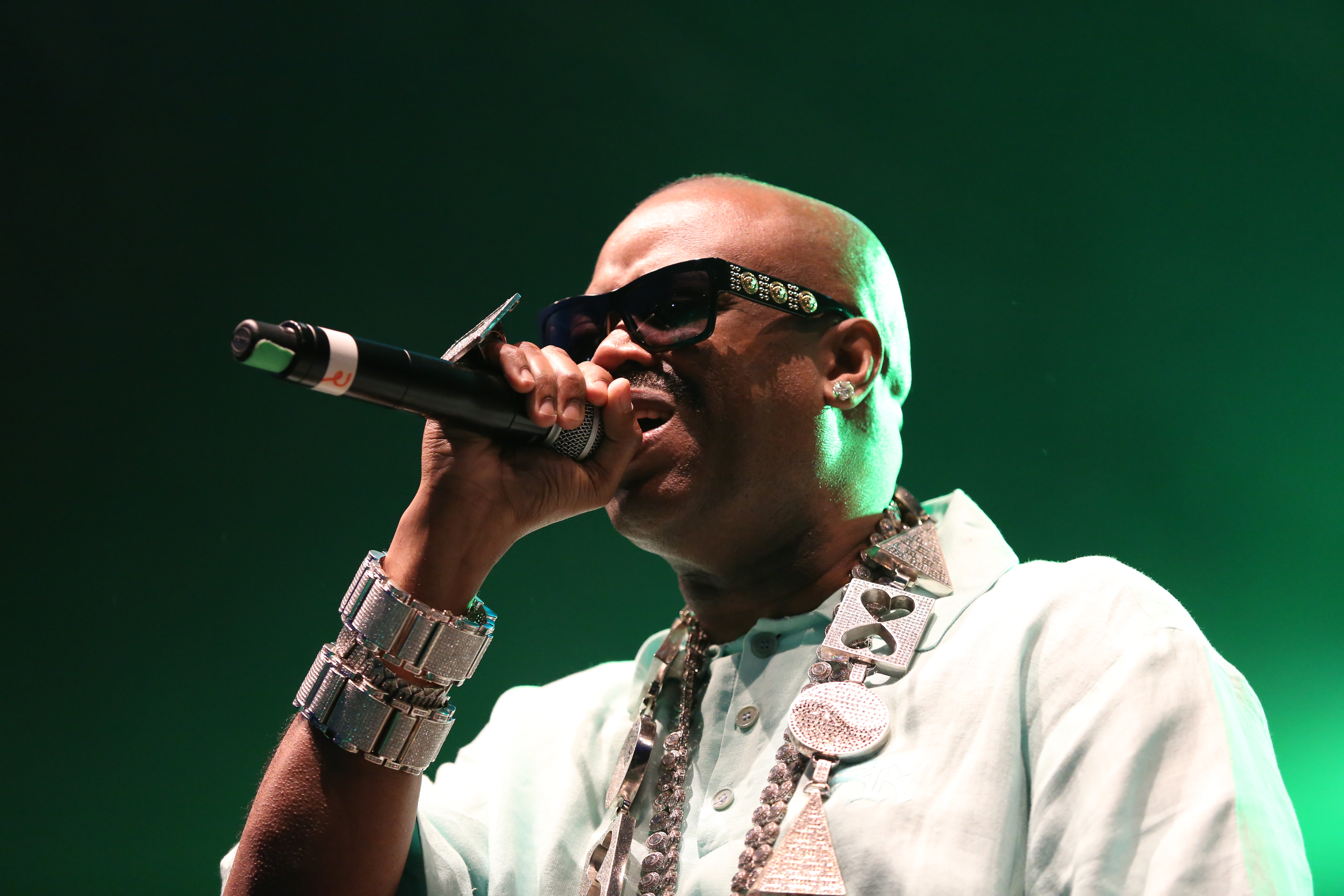
Slick Rick at the Out4Fame Festival in 2016

=== Later career ===
Walters and the Soul Rebels Brass Band collaborated on June 21, 2012, in Washington, DC at the historic Howard Theatre, which re-opened in April 2012.

On November 2, 2018, Walters released the single "Snakes of the World Today". In 2020, Walters was featured on Westside Gunn's album Who Made the Sunshine. In September 2023, it was announced that Walters was finishing up work on a new solo album, his first since The Art of Storytelling. The album, Victory, was released through Idris Elba's 7Wallace record label and Mass Appeal Records. Tracks feature guest rappers Giggs, Nas, and Estelle. It was accompanied by a film to premiere at Tribeca Film Festival on June 7, 2025.

== Legal issues ==
In 1989, Walters' mother, Veronica, hired his first cousin, Mark Plummer, as Walters' bodyguard. By 1990, Plummer had become a liability, trying to extort money from the artist numerous times. Plummer was fired and, unsatisfied with his severance package, tried to rob Walters on several occasions and also threatened to kill the rapper and his mother. When Walters found bullet holes in his front door, he bought guns for protection. On July 3, 1990, Walters spotted Plummer in his neighborhood and fired at least four shots. One bullet hit Plummer; another caught a passerby in the foot. Neither suffered life-threatening injuries.

Walters pleaded guilty to two counts of attempted murder and other charges, including assault, use of a firearm, and criminal possession of a weapon. The rapper called it an act of self-defense. He spent five years in prison, two for the then-second-degree attempted-murder charges he received for the shooting, and three for disputes with the Immigration and Naturalization Services over his residency in the U.S. He was released from prison in 1997. In the documentary film The Show, Russell Simmons interviewed Walters while he was imprisoned on Rikers Island.

In June 2002, Walters was arrested by the Immigration and Naturalization Service (INS) as he re-entered the United States through Florida after performing on a Caribbean cruise ship. He was promptly told that he was being deported under a law allowing deportation of foreigners convicted of felonies. Walters was refused bail for 17 months and was released on November 7, 2003. In October 2006, the Department of Homeland Security began a new attempt to deport Walters to the United Kingdom, moving the case from the United States Court of Appeals for the Second Circuit based in New York to the more conservative Eleventh Circuit. The court is based in Atlanta, Georgia, but the trial was expected to proceed in Florida, where immigration agents originally arrested Walters.

On May 23, 2008, New York Governor David Paterson granted Walters a full and unconditional pardon on the attempted murder charges. The governor was pleased with his behavior since the attempted murders. Slick Rick volunteered his time to mentor kids about violence.

On April 15, 2016, Walters was naturalized as a U.S. citizen, remarking, "I am so proud of this moment—and so honored to finally become an American citizen." He retains his UK citizenship.

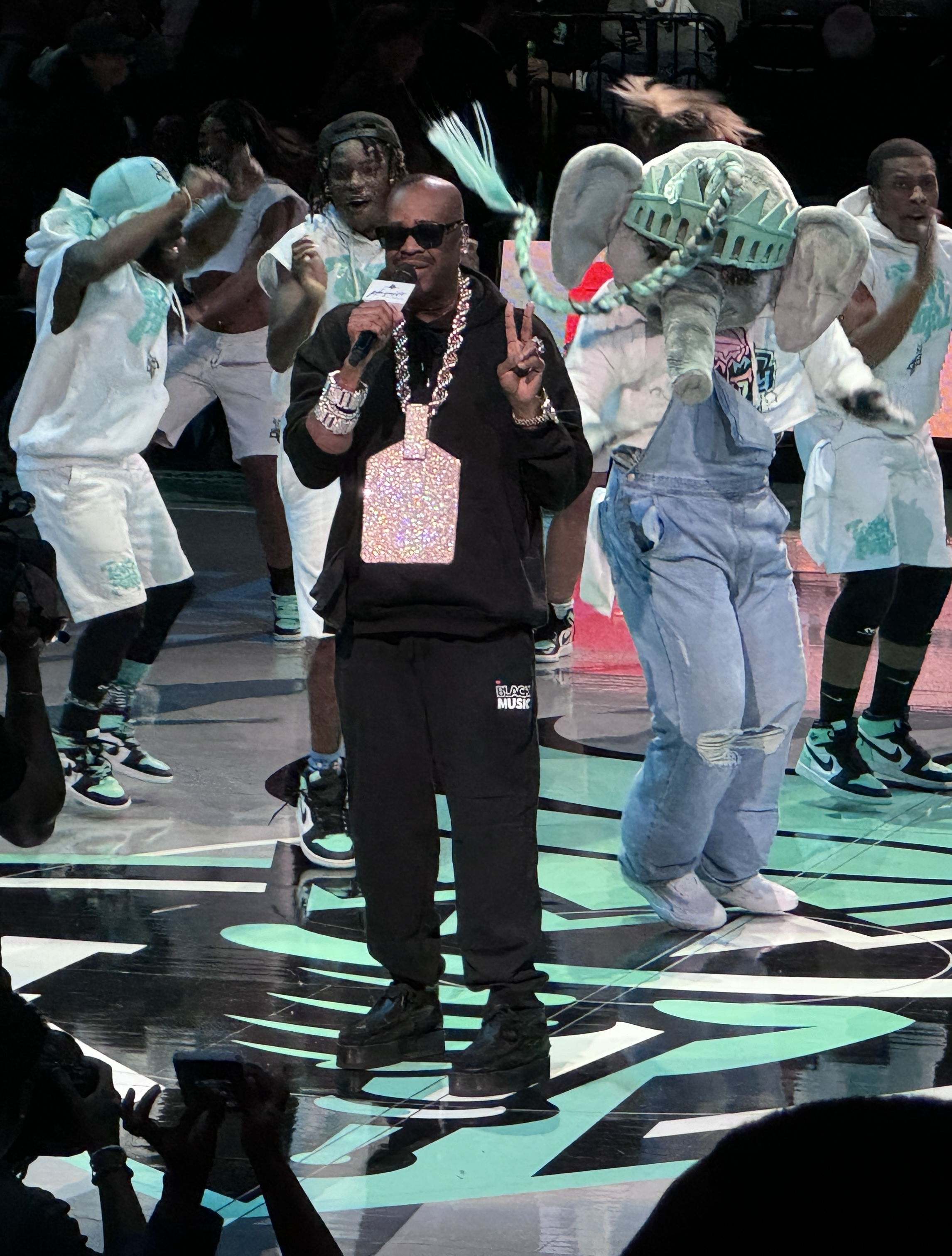
Slick Rick performs at Halftime of the WNBA Playoffs during the NY Liberty/Las Vegas Aces semi-final game on September 29, 2024.

== Rapping style ==
Walters' style has been commended by music critics. Music journalist Peter Shapiro wrote, "'Children's Story' was important because of its narrative structure and Walters' understanding of how crucial little sonic details—such as his use of a female voice and his yawning rap—were to hip hop style."

"Children's Story"
A 24-second sample of Walters' signature song, "Children's Story." The song's structure is in the form of a cautionary children's tale, with themes of robbery and shooting.

As Slick Rick, he is largely known for his story raps, such as "Children's Story" and "La Di Da Di". Shapiro wrote that Walters "largely introduced the art of narrative into hip hop... none of the spinners of picaresque rhymes who followed did it with the same grace or humor." AllMusic states that he has the "reputation as hip hop's greatest storyteller." In the book Check the Technique, Walters is quoted as saying: "I was never the type to say freestyle raps, I usually tell a story, and to do that well I've always had to work things out beforehand." Kool Moe Dee commented that "Slick Rick raised the lost art of hip hop storytelling to a level never seen again." Devin the Dude noted that Slick Rick's "Indian Girl" is a good example of the type of humor that existed in hip hop's golden era, and Peter Shapiro said that "he was funnier than Rudy Ray Moore or Redd Foxx."

Walters retains some British pronunciations, which led Shapiro to say that Walters raps in the "Queen's English". O.C. states: "The Great Adventures of Slick Rick is one of the greatest albums ever... the stuff he was just saying on there, it was so clear... the [clear] syllable dude was Slick Rick for me". He is also renowned for his unique "smooth, British-tinged flow" which contains distinct structures. In the book How to Rap, it is noted that on the song "I Own America", he "puts a rest on almost every other 1-beat so that each set of two lines begins with a rest." Kool Moe Dee stated that, "Rick accomplished being totally original at a time when most MCs were using very similar cadences." He has what is described as "singsong cadences"; Andy Cat of Ugly Duckling mentions that Slick Rick uses a melodic delivery on the track "Hey Young World". Walters is also known to use punch ins extensively, especially in his story rhymes as different characters; According to Kool Moe Dee, Walters used "multi-voices to portray multiple characters".

== Honors ==
- VH1 Hip Hop Honors (2008)
- Mixx Cares Humanitarian Award (2015)
- Bronx Walk of Fame (2018)
- Grammy Lifetime Achievement Award (2023)
- MOBO Lifetime Achievement Award (2026)

== Personal life ==
Walters married Mandy Aragones in April 1997, four years after the couple met at a Manhattan nightclub. The couple have donated about a dozen items from Walters' collection to the Smithsonian National Museum of African American History and Culture. He has two children from a previous relationship.

== Discography ==
Studio albums

- The Great Adventures of Slick Rick (1988)
- The Ruler's Back (1991)
- Behind Bars (1994)
- The Art of Storytelling (1999)
- Victory (2025)

== Filmography ==
Walters makes an appearance as a playable character in the video games Def Jam: Fight for NY and Def Jam Fight for NY: The Takeover.
