= Onyx discography =

- Studio albums: 15
- Extended plays: 1
- Compilation albums: 8
- Singles: 60
- Music videos: 54
- Collaborative albums: 2

The discography of American hardcore hip-hop group Onyx consist of 14 studio albums, 2 collaborative albums, 1 EP, 8 compilation albums and 60 singles. Eight singles of the group were in the top ten of the Billboard charts. The group is best known for their platinum-certified hit "Slam".

== Albums ==
=== Studio albums ===
List of studio albums, with selected chart positions and certifications
Title	Album details	Peak chart positions		Certifications
Title	Album details	US	US R&B	Certifications
Bacdafucup	Released: March 30, 1993; Label: JMJ, Chaos, RAL; Format: CD, LP, cassette, digital download	17	8	RIAA: Platinum; MC: Gold
All We Got Iz Us	Released: October 24, 1995; Label: JMJ, RAL; Format: CD, LP, cassette, digital download	22	2	
Shut 'Em Down	Released: June 2, 1998; Label: JMJ, Def Jam; Format: CD, LP, cassette, digital download	10	3	
Bacdafucup: Part II	Released: July 9, 2002; Label: Koch; Format: CD, LP, cassette, digital download	46	11	
Triggernometry	Released: July 22, 2003; Label: D3; Format: CD, digital download	—	66	
Wakedafucup	Released: March 18, 2014; Label: Goon MuSick; Format: CD, LP, cassette, digital download	—	—	
Black Rock	Released: February 16, 2018; Label: X-Ray; Format: CD, LP, digital download	—	—	
Snowmads	Released: November 15, 2019; Label: Goon MuSick; Format: CD, LP, digital download	—	—	
Onyx 4 Life	Released: April 9, 2021; Label: X-Ray; Format: CD, LP, digital download	—	—	
1993	Released: March 4, 2022; Label: 100 Mad; Format: CD, LP, cassette, digital download	—	—	
Onyx Versus Everybody	Released: May 13, 2022; Label: Surface Noise; Format: CD, LP, digital download	—	—	
Blood On Da X	Released: May 5, 2023; Label: X-Ray; Format: CD, digital download	—	—	
World Take Over	Released: October 6, 2023; Label: 100 Mad; Format: CD, LP, digital download	—	—	
Lower East Side	Released: April 11, 2025; Label: X-Ray; Format: CD, LP, digital download	—	—	
It All Started in Brooklyn	Released: July 31, 2026 Label: X-Ray Format: CD, LP, digital download			

=== Collaborative albums ===
Title	Album details
Shotgunz in Hell (with Dope D.O.D.)	Released: May 29, 2017; Label: 100 Mad, Dope D.O.D.; Format: CD, LP, digital download
Battle Royale (with L’uZine)	Released: April 29, 2025; Label: 100 Mad; Format: CD, digital download

=== Compilation albums ===
Title	Album details
Cold Case Files: Vol. 1	Released: August 19, 2008; Label: Iceman; Format: CD, digital download
Cold Case Files: Vol. 2	Released: August 10, 2012; Label: Major Independents; Format: CD, digital download
Turndafucup	Released: July 8, 2014; Label: X-Ray; Format: CD, digital download
Icon	Released: September 25, 2015; Label: Def Jam; Format: CD, digital download
Lost Treasures	Released: February 7, 2020; Label: X-Ray; Format: CD, digital download
Ghetto Anthems	Released: June 14, 2024; Label: X-Ray; Format: CD, digital download
Cold Case Files: Vol. 3	Released: October 22, 2024; Label: 100 Mad; Format: CD, digital download

== Extended plays ==
Title	EP details
Against All Authorities	Released: May 5, 2015; Label: Goon MuSick; Format: CD, digital download

== Singles ==
Year	Single	Chart positions					Certifications	Album
Year	Single	Billboard				UK	Certifications	Album
Year	Single	US	US R&B	US Rap	Dance	UK	Certifications	Album
1990	"Ah, And We Do It Like This"	-	-	-	-	-		Non-album single
1992	"Throw Ya Gunz"	81	61	1	24	34		Bacdafucup
1993	"Slam"	4	11	1	1	31	RIAA: Platinum	Bacdafucup
1993	"Shifftee"	92	52	2	14	-		Bacdafucup
1993	"Da Nex Niguz/Da Nex DingDong"	-	-	-	-	-		Bacdafucup
1993	"Judgment Night" (with Biohazard)	-	-	-	-	-		Judgment Night (soundtrack)
1995	"Live Niguz"	102	81	17	13	-		The Show (soundtrack)/All We Got Iz Us
1995	"Last Dayz"	89	61	10	28	-		All We Got Iz Us
1996	"Thangz Changed"	-	-	-	-	-		Sunset Park (soundtrack)
1997	"Vissi D'Arte"	-	-	-	-	-		The Rapsody Overture
1998	"The Worst" (with Wu-Tang Clan)	-	64	22	6	-		Ride (soundtrack); Shut 'Em Down
1998	"React" (featuring 50 Cent, Bonifucco, Still Livin' and X-1)	115	62	44	-	-		Shut 'Em Down
1998	"Shut 'Em Down" (featuring DMX)	107	61	43	26	136		Shut 'Em Down
1998	"Broke Willies / Ghetto Starz"	-	-	-	-	-		Shut 'Em Down
2002	"Hold Up"	-	-	-	-	-		Bacdafucup Part II
2002	"Big Trucks/Bring 'Em Out Dead"	-	-	-	-	-		Bacdafucup Part II
2002	"Slam Harder/Hold Up"	-	-	-	-	-		Bacdafucup Part II
2002	"Slam Harder/Bring 'Em Out Dead"	-	-	-	-	-		Bacdafucup Part II
2003	"Mama Cryin'/Wild N Here"	-	-	-	-	-		Triggernometry
2008	"Neva Goin' Bac"	-	-	-	-	-		Black Rock
2009	"Money In The Sky" (featuring Saprano The Great)	-	-	-	-	-		
2009	"Black Rock (U Know Wht It Iz)"	-	-	-	-	-		Black Rock
2009	"The Real Black Rock"	-	-	-	-	-		Black Rock
2009	"Slam Boyz"	-	-	-	-	-		Black Rock
2009	-"Love Is a Gun" (featuring Mezmo)	-	-	-	-			Black Rock
2009	-"Blinded By The Light" (featuring Optimus)	-	-	-	-			
2010	"Black Hoodie Rap" (featuring Makem Pay)	-	-	-	-	-		CUZO
2010	"Mad Energy"	-	-	-	-	-		CUZO
2011	"Classic Terror"	-	-	-	-	-		CUZO
2011	"I'm So 90's"	-	-	-	-	-		CUZO
2011	"If The Hood Was Mine" (featuring Keith Robinson)	-	-	-	-	-		CUZO
2011	"We On That" (featuring Young Kazh)	-	-	-	-	-		CUZO
2011	"You Ain't Ready For Me"	-	-	-	-	-		CUZO
2011	"What You Gonna Do"	-	-	-	-	-		CUZO
2012	"2012" (featuring Myster DL)	-	-	-	-	-		CUZO
2012	"Belly Of The Beast"	-	-	-	-	-		CUZO
2013	"Slam" (Re-Recorded)	-	-	-	-	-		Urban Classics of the 80's 90's & 2000's
2014	"Crime Pays"	-	-	-	-	-		Crime Pays - Single
2014	"Last Dayz" (Re-Recorded)	-	-	-	-	-		Songs of the 90's
2014	"WakeDaFucUp" (featuring Dope D.O.D.)	-	-	-	-	-		#WakeDaFucUp
2014	"We Don't Fuckin' Care" (featuring A$AP Ferg & Sean Price)	-	-	-	-	-		#WakeDaFucUp
2014	"The Tunnel" (featuring Cormega)	-	-	-	-	-		#WakeDaFucUp
2014	"Whut Whut"	-	-	-	-	-		#WakeDaFucUp
2015	"Against All Authorities"	-	-	-	-	-		Against All Authorities
2015	"Strike Bac" (featuring Sick Flo)	-	-	-	-	-		Against All Authorities
2016	"Jingle Bells, Shotgun Shells"	-	-	-	-	-		Hip Hop & R&B Christmas Gold
2016	"Do U Back Down" (Re-Recorded)	-	-	-	-	-		Never Back Down: No Surrender
2017	"XXX"	-	-	-	-	-		Shotgunz in Hell
2017	"Piro"	-	-	-	-	-		Shotgunz in Hell
2017	"Problem Child"	-	-	-	-	-		Silicon Valley (Music from the HBO Original Series)
2018	"Ima F*ckin Rockstar" (featuring Skyzoo)	-	-	-	-	-		Black Rock
2018	"O.D." (featuring R.A. the Rugged Man)	-	-	-	-	-		Black Rock
2019	«Ain’t No Time To Rest» (featuring Dope D.O.D.)	-	-	-	-	-		SnowMads
2019	«Kill Da Mic»	-	-	-	-	-		SnowMads
2019	«Mad Shoot Outs» (featuring Flee Lord)	-	-	-	-	-		SnowMads
2020	«Rat Tat Tat» (featuring Quadro & Ufo Fev)	-	-	-	-	-		SnowMads
2020	«Street Art» (featuring SickFlo)	-	-	-	-	-		SnowMads
2020	«Bandits» (featuring DJ Access & Snowgoons)	-	-	-	-	-		
2020	«Kill Da Mic (Remix)» (featuring Ali (45 Scientific))	-	-	-	-	-		
2020	«Jingle Bells, Shotgun Shells»	-	-	-	-	-		

== Soundtrack appearances ==
- August 21, 1993: Strapped
- September 14, 1993: Judgment Night
- October 14, 1993: Beavis and Butt-Head ("Buff 'N' Stuff")
- March 18, 1994: Beavis and Butt-Head ("Rabies Scare")
- April 6, 1995: The Addiction
- August 15, 1995: The Show
- April 23, 1996: Sunset Park
- February 17, 1998: Ride (Music From The Dimension Motion Picture)
- December 21, 2001: How High
- October 29, 2002: 8 Mile
- March 18, 2003: The Shield
- October 24, 2005: Grand Theft Auto: Liberty City Stories
- July 14, 2009: A Day in the Life
- June 19, 2015: Dope
- December 13, 2015: Brooklyn Nine-Nine
- August 5, 2016: The Tonight Show Starring Jimmy Fallon
- December 17, 2016: Why Him?
- June 7, 2016: Never Back Down: No Surrender
- February 16, 2017: Fist Fight
- June 23, 2017: Silicon Valley (Music from the HBO Original Series)
- May 24, 2020: Tiger Slam
- August 14, 2020: Ted Lasso ("Biscuits")

== Guest appearances ==
- 1993: "Livin' Loc'd"; "A Blind Date With Boss" by Bo$$ (feat. Onyx) from Bo$$ Born Gangstaz
- 1993: "Get Open" by Run-D.M.C. (feat. Onyx) from Run-D.M.C. Down With The King
- 1995: "I'll Murder You Remix" by Gang Green (feat. Onyx) from Gang Green I'll Murder You - Single
- 1997: "Santa Baby" by Rev. Run (feat. Mase, Diddy, Snoop Dogg, Salt-N-Pepa, Onyx & Keith Murray) from Various Artists A Very Special Christmas 3
- 1998: "Xtreme" by All City (feat. Onyx) from All City Metropolis Gold
- 1999: "Roc-In-It" by Deejay Punk-Roc (feat. Onyx) from Deejay Punk-Roc Deejay Punk-Roc vs. Onyx – Roc-In-It
- 2001: "Shut 'Em Down 2001" by Stone Rivers (feat. Sticky Fingaz, Fredro Starr) from Stone Rivers All My Life
- 2001: "Soldierz" by Fredro Starr from Firestarr
- 2002: "Go Hard (Remix)" by Made Men (feat. Onyx, Cadillac Tah & Black Child, Kurupt, Crooked I & Eastwood) from Made Men Rebirth Of The West Coast EP
- 2003: "Last Days Reloaded" by Dead Prez (feat. Onyx) from Dead Prez Turn Off The Radio: The Mixtape Vol. 2-Get Free Or Die Tryin
- 2005: "Don't Go" by Darryl Riley (feat. Onyx & Henesseys) from Darryl Riley Man On Fire
- 2009: "International Thug" by Mal Da Udal (feat. Onyx) from Mal Da Udal International Thug
- 2009: "International Thug" by Mal Da Udal (feat. Onyx) (Thug Version) from Mal Da Udal International Thug
- 2009: "Vodka Rap" by Mal Da Udal (feat. Fredro Starr, B-Reign & Partymaker_Stef) from Mal Da Udal International Thug
- 2010: "Say What" by Mal Da Udal (feat. Onyx & Dzham) from Mal Da Udal Рэп не ради денег
- 2010: "Vrijeme je" by Nered & Stoka (feat. Onyx)
- 2010: "Запоминай" by ZB (feat. Onyx, Soprano, TK) from ZB Авородз
- 2011: "Arretez Les Tchatches" by Storm B (feat. Onyx)
- 2011: "Bringin' Bac Da Madface" by Annakin Slayd (feat. Fredro Starr & Sticky Fingaz of Onyx) from Annakin Slayd Once More We Survive
- 2011: "Get 'Em!" by Deep Frost (feat. Onyx & MC Profound)
- 2011: "Ready For War" by Soulkast (feat. Onyx & Brahi) from Soulkast Honoris Causa
- 2011: "Corner Store Hip-Hop" by SYDAFX (feat. Onyx)
- 2012: "Classic Hardcore (feat. Onyx) by Babo (feat. Onyx) from Babo Legends never die
- 2012: "Vandalize Shit" by Snak The Ripper (feat. Onyx) from Snak The Ripper White Dynamite
- 2012: "Dogz" by Agallah (feat. Onyx)
- 2012: "Bloodsport" by Duke Montana (feat. Onyx) from Duke Montana Stay Gold
- 2012: "45 Game" by Monstar361 & Massaka (feat. Onyx) from Monstar361 & Massaka Blutbeton 2
- 2012: "Colabo" by Slums Attack (feat. Onyx & TEWU) from Slums Attack CNO2
- 2012: "Sweet Nothing" by So Sick Social Club (feat. Onyx & Jason Rockman of Slaves On Dope) from So Sick Social Club Dead Friends Don't Tell
- 2012: "My Purpose" by Young Noble (feat. Onyx & E.D.I.) from Young Noble Outlaw Rydahz, Vol. 1
- 2013: "Yasanan Dram" by Onder Sahin & Rahmi Polat a.k.a. Babo (feat. Onyx & Ceza & Crak)
- 2013: "Fuck Out My Face" by ASAP Ferg (feat. B-Real, Onyx & Aston Matthews) from ASAP Ferg Trap Lord
- 2013: "Unite 2 United" by Click Click Boom (feat. Onyx) from Click Click Boom Click Click Boom
- 2013: "Panic Room" by Dope D.O.D. (feat. Onyx) from Dope D.O.D. Da Roach
- 2013: "Small World" by Krazy K (feat. Onyx) from Krazy K Small World
- 2013: "We Get Live" by Myster DL (feat. Onyx) from Myster DL We Get Live
- 2013: "Do U Bac Down" by Snowgoons (feat. Onyx) from Snowgoons Black Snow 2
- 2014: "Represent" by N'Pans (feat. Onyx) from N'Pans Aktsent
- 2014: "Represent" (Portuguese - Creole version) by N'Pans (feat. Onyx) from N'Pans Aktsent
- 2014: "My Brother's Keeper" by DJ Kay Slay (feat. The Outlawz, Onyx) from DJ Kay Slay The Last Hip Hop Disciple (Mixtape)
- 2014: "Schocktherapie" by Best.E (feat. Satan & Onyx) from Best.E Der Blaue Reiter
- 2014: "Schocktherapie" (Remix) by Best.E (feat. Satan & Onyx)
- 2014: "Mayday" by Dirrty D & Morsdood (feat. Onyx)
- 2014: "Get Up" by DJ Jean Maron (feat. Onyx) from DJ Jean Maron True School
- 2014: "Coming for You" by Ryzhun (feat. Onyx)
- 2014: "Bazdmeg" by Killakikitt (feat. Onyx) from Killakikitt KillaGoons
- 2014: "Madd Rush" by OptiMystic (feat. Onyx & JR.) from OptiMystic Day Of The Guiding Light
- 2015: "Fight" by Лигалайз (feat. Onyx) from Лигалайз Fight - Single
- 2015: "Nobody Move" by MoSS (feat. Onyx & Havoc) from MoSS Marching to the Sound of My Own Drum
- 2015: "Las Calles Me Lo Exigen" by Tankeone (feat. Onyx) from Tankeone Las Calles Me Lo Exigen - Single
- 2016: "Downward Spiral" by Ras Kass (feat. Freddie Foxxx & Onyx) from Ras Kass Intellectual Property: SOI2
- 2016: "E.A.T." by Ali Vegas (feat. Onyx & a Dash) from Ali Vegas Just Let Me Rhyme
- 2016: "Give It Up" by Рем Дигга (feat. Onyx) from Рем Дигга 42/37
- 2016: "Freestyle" by Sam The Sleezbag & DJ Mekalek (feat. Onyx, Bishop Brigante) from Sam The Sleezbag & DJ Mekalek #SleezbagMekalekTape
- 2017: "Slam Wieder" by Eko Fresh (feat. Samy Deluxe, Afrob & Onxy) from Eko Fresh König von Deutschland
- 2017: "Hardcore Rap" by Klee Magor (feat. Onyx) from Klee Magor Hardcore Rap (feat. ONYX) - Single
- 2017: "900" by Onyx, H16 & DMS
- 2017: "100 Mad Vets" by N.B.S. (feat. Onyx) from N.B.S. 100 Mad Vets - Single
- 2018: "Where They At" by N.B.S. (feat. Onyx) from N.B.S. SwissVets 2
- 2018: "Heat" by Suspect (feat. Onyx) from Suspect Razorblade Music
- 2018: "Out for Blood" by Armada the Producer (feat. Onyx, Kali Ranks) from Armada the Producer The Formula - EP
- 2018: "Uliczna Autonomia 2" by Street Autonomy (feat. Onyx) from Street Autonomy Uliczna Autonomia
- 2018: "Turn The Volume Up" by N.B.S. (feat. Onyx) from N.B.S. Lost In Budapest
- 2018: "Make It Count" by Larceny (feat. Onyx) from Larceny Make It Count
- 2018: "Represent" (Remix) by N'Pans (feat. Onyx) from N'Pans Легенда
- 2019: "Murda" by Marso & Bobkata (feat. Onyx)
- 2020: "Whats Up" by Lords of the Underground (feat. Onyx) from Lords of the Underground So Legendary
- 2020: "6 Feet" by Crack Brodas (feat. Onyx) from Crack Brodas 6 Feet - Single
- 2020: "Golden Era" by Yumalesra (feat. Onyx) from Yumalesra Golden Era (feat. Onyx) - Single
- 2020: "B******t" by Sick Boy Simon & Dirty Dagoes (feat. Onyx) from Sick Boy Simon & Dirty Dagoes B******t (feat. Onyx) - Single
- 2020: "We Made It Up" by Iceman (feat. Onyx) from Iceman We Made It Up - Single
- 2023: "Traversée Solitaire" by Coeff feat. Hit l'Agité (feat. Onyx) from COEFF Traversée Solitaire - Single
- 2025: "Hole In Ya Chest" by SnowGoons & Ben Shorr & Onyx (Prod. by Sicknature)

== Music videos ==
- 1992: "Throw Ya Gunz" | Directed by Diane Martel
- 1992: "Bacdafucup" | Directed by Steve Carr
- 1993: "Slam" | Directed by Parris Mayhew
- 1993: "Da Nex Niguz" | Directed by Brett Ratner
- 1993: "Shifftee" | Directed by Parris Mayhew
- 1993: "Slam" (Bionyx Remix) (feat. Biohazard) | Directed by Parris Mayhew
- 1993: "Judgment Night" (feat. Biohazard) | Directed by David Perez Shadi
- 1995: "All We Got Iz Us" | Directed by Joseph Kahn
- 1995: "Last Dayz" | Directed by Joseph Kahn
- 1995: "I'll Murder You" (feat. Gang Green) | Directed by Zodiac Fishgrease
- 1995: "Live Niguz" | Directed by Diane Martel
- 1995: "Walk In New York" | Directed by Zodiac Fishgrease
- 1998: "Shut 'Em Down" (feat. DMX) | Directed by Gregory Dark
- 1998: "The Worst" (feat. Wu-Tang Clan) | Directed by Diane Martel
- 1998: "React" (feat. Still Livin', X1 & 50 Cent) | Directed by Little X
- 1998: "Broke Willies" | Directed by Little X
- 2002: "Slam Harder" | Directed by Zodiac Fishgrease
- 2008: "Neva Goin' Bac" | Directed by Russell Harvin & Fredro Starr
- 2009: "Money In The Sky" (feat. Soprano Da Great)
- 2009: "Black Rock (U Know Wht It Iz)" | Directed by Jeffrey Elmont
- 2009: "The Real Black Rock" (Dame Dash Diss W- Jay-Z Soundalike Voice-overs) | Directed by Jeffrey Elmont
- 2010: "Black Hoodie Rap" (feat. MakemPay) | Directed by Sticky Fingaz
- 2011: "Classic Terror" | Directed by Sticky Fingaz
- 2011: "I'm So 90's" | Directed by Brazil
- 2011: "Mad Energy" | Directed by Sticky Fingaz
- 2011: "We On That" (feat. Young Kazh) | Directed by Big Shot Music INC.
- 2011: "Wut U Gonna Do" | Directed by Myster DL
- 2011: "Hammers On Deck" | Directed by Myster DL
- 2011: "You Ain't Ready For Me" | Directed by Big Shot Music INC.
- 2012: "2012" (feat. Myster DL) | Directed by Myster DL
- 2012: "2012" (Russian version) | Directed by Ярослав Кардэлло и Артем Стряпан
- 2012: "Belly Of The Beast" | Directed by Kevin KJ Johnson
- 2014: "#WakeDaFucUp" (feat. Dope D.O.D.) | Directed by Home Run
- 2014: "Whut Whut" | Directed by Big Shot Music INC.
- 2014: "Buc Bac" | Directed by DJ Illegal; Filmed by Gigo Flow; Edited by SirQlate
- 2014: "Hammers On Deck" | Directed by Brian De Palma
- 2014: "TurnDaFucUp" | Directed by Rome York & Trash Secco
- 2014: "The Realest" | Directed by Big Shot Music INC.
- 2015: "Against All Authorities" | Directed by Rome York
- 2015: "Fuck Da Law" | Directed by Rome York
- 2016: "#WakeDaFucUp Reloaded" (feat. Dope D.O.D.) | Directed by Home Run
- 2016: "BOOM!!" | Directed by Eyes Jacking
- 2016: "Slam" (Devil s Domain movie) | Directed by Jared Cohn
- 2017: "Hustlin Hours" | Directed by DJ Illegal
- 2017: "XXX" by Onyx & Dope D.O.D. | Directed and edited by Andres Fouche
- 2017: "Piro" by Onyx & Dope D.O.D. | Animation by Martijn Bosgraaf, Ricardo Gómez & Lars Kiewiet
- 2017: "Don't Sleep" by Onyx & Dope D.O.D. | Directed and edited by Andres Fouche
- 2018: "Black Rock" | Directed by Vicente Cordero
- 2019: "Ain't No Time To Rest" (feat. Dope D.O.D.) | Directed by Gigo Flow
- 2019: "Kill Da Mic" | Directed by Rok Kadoic
- 2019: "Monsters Gorillas" | Directed by ShotByDon
- 2020: "Hoodies Down" | Directed by Gigo Flow & DJ Illegal
- 2021: "Coming Outside" | Directed by Vicente Cordero / Industrialism Films
- 2021: "Ahh Yeah" | Directed by Vicente Cordero / Industrialism Films
