= Black Rock (Onyx album) =

Studio album by Onyx
- Released: February 16, 2018
- Recorded: 2004–2017
- Studio: Steakhouse Recording Studios (Los Angeles); OPM Studios (Los Angeles)
- Genre: East Coast hip-hop; hardcore hip-hop; rap rock
- Length: 35:17
- Label: X-Ray
- Producer: Fredro Starr (exec.); Sticky Fingaz (exec.); Omar "Iceman" Sharif (exec.); Desmond "DSP" Powell (co-prod.); Onyx; Emiljo Albert Cassagrande

Onyx chronology
Shotgunz in Hell (2017)	Black Rock (2018)	Snowmads (2019)

Singles from Black Rock
- 1. "Ima F*ckin Rockstar" Released: January 30, 2018; 2. "O.D." Released: February 14, 2018

Professional ratings
Review scores
Source	Rating
HipHop4Real	5/5 stars
Faygoluvers	4/5 stars
HotNewHipHop	HOTTTTT

Black Rock is the seventh studio album by American rap group Onyx, released on February 16, 2018, via X-Ray Records. The whole album was produced by 18-year-old Slovenian producer Emiljo Albert Cassagrande. The album features appearances by American rappers Optimus (also known as Jordy Towers), Skyzoo, R.A. the Rugged Man, Sick Flo, Snak the Ripper and DJ Nelson

== Background ==
In late 2002, Onyx decided to record a new rap-rock album with live instruments and hip-hop drums. The album was planned to be released on the D3 Entertainment label in 2003, and the group planned to record their first metal song together with Crazy Town for the soundtrack to the film Torque (2004).

Onyx returned to the process of recording the album in 2006, when Sticky Fingaz first announced that Onyx is working on a new album called "Black Rock".

"...There is a new Onyx album coming out the end of this year," he revealed. "The name of the new album is called 'The Black Rock'. That will be on [Jones' new company] Major Independents as well."

Onyx back to talk about a new album in 2008.

"...Black Rock is a hybrid album – Rock influenced with Hip Hop underneath it. It's us repping for the rebels of the world, the rebels of the street who Onyx represents. It's a where hip-hop meets the mosh pit."

In 2008, Fredro Starr and Sticky Fingaz met a young talented singer Optimus (also known as Jordy Towers), who featured on 3 songs for the album "Black Rock": "The Greatest Day of My Life", "Chasing The Devil" and "Blinded By The Light" and even starred in a video for the last song. The whole album was produced by Desmond "DSP" Powell. The album was done in June 2008 according to the interview with Sticky Fingaz. In a 2008 interview for AllHipHop Fredro said that the album should have been released in 1994. It should have been Onyx second album.

== Controversy ==
The album was due out in late 2009. In the summer of the same year Onyx did a tour "Black Rock U.S.A. Tour Summer 2009" consist of the cities of United States. But the album's release was postponed because of Damon Dash, one of the three founders of Roc-A-Fella Records, who together with Ohio-based rock duo The Black Keys with the participation of New York City-based rappers like Mos Def, Billy Danze, Q-Tip and RZA released an album called "Blakroc" in late 2009 (a collaboration of rap and rock), thus destroying the plans of Onyx.

The first single from Damon Dash's project "BlakRoc" was released on September 14, 2009, and thus announced the release of a new project. A week later, on September 21, on Angela Yee and Leah Rose's "Lip Service" radio show on Shade 45, Onyx spoke about this:

"...Niggas is biting the whole fuckin' movement", Fredro Starr explained. "The 'Black Rock' shit, we been rocking with that. Now I'm hearing other niggas coming out with it. I ain't sayin' no fuckin' names. You know what it is man, holla at me niggas, 100 mad niggas with guns niggas, stop playing games with me!"

"...Onyx is putting out a 'Black Rock' project, and that's it! And anybody else, tryna put putting out a black rock project, you biting!", blustered Sticky Fingaz. "If that shit come out, I promise you I put trademarks around your fuckin' eyes. All of y'all niggas. I'm do to y'all niggas like the fuckin' candyman, come find y'all niggas one at a fuckin' time! It ain't about who put it out first, it's about who getting punched in they fuckin' eye first."

== New "Black Rock" ==
"Black Rock" is a hybrid album of hip-hop and rock and roll. Onyx mixes hardcore vocal delivery with heavy guitar riffs to create the most aggressive release of the group's career. All the songs were produced by 18-year-old Slovenian producer Emiljo Albert Cassagrande. In March 2017, Emiljo sent his beats to Fredro Starr and hoped for further cooperation. Fredro immediately appreciated the experience of the young beatmaker, and from the following month began work with his cousin Sticky Fingaz on the new album "Black Rock". Fredro and Sticky re-recorded their 10-year-old acappellas over new music from Emiljo. Then they pulled up to the project other rappers – Sick Flo (from Atlanta), Snak the Ripper (from Canada) and DJ Nelson (from France). In late July they were joined by two rappers from New York: Skyzoo and R.A. the Rugged Man. The vocals that Optimus (also known as Jordy Towers) recorded in 2008 was decided to remain unchanged.

The inspiration for this new album came from their 1993 "Judgement Night" track with Brooklyn's hardcore punk/heavy metal fusion band Biohazard which was the lead single on the influential Judgment Night movie soundtrack, where hip-hop meet rock in many of its various forms.

== Singles ==
"Ima F*ckin Rockstar" is the first single from "Black Rock" featuring Skyzoo was released on January 30, 2018. The single was premiered on XXL (magazine), where Fredro tells the story about the song:

"...We linked with Skyzoo after we heard the song 'Bamboo' on his Peddler Themes EP; he was basically paying homage to [my] character in the movie Strapped"

The second single "O.D." featuring R.A. the Rugged Man was released on February 14, 2018. The single was premiered on HipHopDX

== Videos ==
Onyx released three videos from the first version of "Black Rock" album: "Neva Goin' Bac" (2008), "Black Rock (U Know Wht It Iz)" (2009), "The Real Black Rock" (2009). Another video for the song "Blinded By The Light" is still unreleased. The video was shot by Preston Whitmore in the Mojave Desert, California on April 26, 2009. At that time, the song had another producer, Desmond "DSP" Powell, which is credited as co-producer on this album.

Onyx released visuals for the title track "Black Rock" in March 2018. Video was premiered on XXL (magazine). A new video from Onyx for the song "Black Rock" reminds the movie "Kazaam" (1996), where a young boy with the help of boombox woke up a black genie, played by the basketball player and rapper Shaquille O'Neal. The role of the genies was played by Fredro Starr and Sticky Fingaz, but instead of a boombox they have been held captive for many years by the Marshall's guitar amplifier, which the young girl connected to the guitar, and made a real hip-hop party with Onyx.

== Track listing ==
#	track	featured guest(s)	producer(s)	length
01.	"Onyx!!"		Emiljo Albert Cassagrande	0:28
02.	"Black Rock"	DJ Nelson	Emiljo Albert Cassagrande	2:54
03.	"What U Want from Me"		Emiljo Albert Cassagrande	2:42
04.	"Blinded by the Light"	Optimus	Emiljo Albert Cassagrande	3:42
05.	"Ima F*ckin Rockstar"	Skyzoo	Emiljo Albert Cassagrande	3:05
06.	"Lighters Intro"		Emiljo Albert Cassagrande	0:21
07.	"Lighters"		Emiljo Albert Cassagrande	3:11
08.	"Greatest Day"	Optimus	Emiljo Albert Cassagrande	3:02
09.	"O.D."	R.A. the Rugged Man	Emiljo Albert Cassagrande	3:04
10.	"Love Is a Gun"		Emiljo Albert Cassagrande	3:54
11.	"Point Em Out"		Emiljo Albert Cassagrande	2:45
12.	"Chasing the Devil"	Optimus; Sick Flo; Snak the Ripper	Emiljo Albert Cassagrande	6:02
