= X1 (rapper) =

American rapper (1979–2007)

- Born: Bruce David Sandlin; March 6, 1979; Brooklyn, New York City, U.S.
- Origin: Queens, New York City, U.S.
- Died: July 4, 2007 (aged 28) Las Vegas, Nevada, U.S.
- Genres: East Coast hip-hop; hardcore hip-hop
- Occupations: Rapper; songwriter; actor
- Years active: 1994–2007
- Labels: Armee; Tyson; Ball'r; Dynasty
- Formerly of: Gang Green
- Website: x1world.com

Bruce David Sandlin (March 6, 1979 – July 4, 2007), better known by his stage name X1, was an American rapper best known in the 1990s as a member of Gang Green and affiliated with Onyx.

== Early life ==
X1 was born on March 6, 1979, in Brooklyn. His family lived on 1088 Bushwick Ave. A year later he moved to Queens with his parents. When he was 16 he was selling drugs in the corners of Queens trying to get rich quick. But he realized that this was not the way to achieve success. Hip-hop became a part of his life when he began performing freestyles in public and at his school.

== Career ==
One day Bruce met some teenagers from his neighborhood and formed a group that included in addition to him, Dez (who later changed his name to Still Livin), Chop, Cyph Certified and Whosane the younger brother of Fredro Starr. That is when he created a nickname X1. The guys would rap at the intersection of 131st Street and Rockaway Blvd in front of a Kennedy Fried Chicken. They were eventually discovered by the popular hip-hop group Onyx which immediately invited them to the studio. The name of the group Gang Green appeared from the lines of Fredro Starr. Onyx signed them to their own label Armee Records which was distributed by Capitol Records and Mercury Records.

Soon Gang Green released their first single I'll Murder You produced by Fredro Starr. The B-side contains a remix recorded with Onyx. The excerpt from this remix was on the second album of Onyx All We Got Iz Us. Then the group made a video for the song which was in rotation on local TV channels including the Video Music Box. Then followed interviews and concerts including Apollo Theater and The Tunnel.

Over time Gang Green gained more knowledge, connections and experience in the music industry. X1 and Still Livin' together took part in the video for the Onyx's song React, where the then-unknown 50 Cent also took part. Gang Green also attended the studio while Onyx recorded songs including Evil Streets Remix studio session with Method Man in 1994. Unreleased songs by X1 and his group were released only after many years on Onyx's collections, Cold Case Files: Vol. 1 and Cold Case Files: Vol. 2.

They were popular in their neighborhood but for some reason the labels were not interested in them. Every record label they brought their demos to asked "Who's that one kid???" meaning X1. Onyx quickly learned about this and took the X1 on board. X1 immediately took part in the recording of three albums by Onyx: Shut 'Em Down, Bacdafucup: Part II and Triggernometry, and in the recording of Fredro Starr and Sticky Fingaz's solo albums.

After taking part in the recording of Onyx's third album Shut 'Em Down and touring with them, X1 focused on his solo career leaving Onyx but still on good terms with them he later on helped them with there solo projects. In 2000 X1 signed to the label of Mike Tyson Tyson Records. A year after that the label did not quite take off the way X1 expected so he then went and signed a new deal with California record company Ball'R Records which had a roster consisting of three acts: Krayzie Bone, The Relativez and X1. The label ended folded before X1 could release some. Then X1 signed to the label Dynasty Records (based out of Las Vegas) where he was due to release his debut album Young, Rich and Gangsta on September 19, 2006.

== Death ==
X1 was found dead in his Las Vegas home on July 4, 2007. His friends believe that he was killed and that his death was staged as a suicide during an Independence Day firework display. The cause of death is still unknown. It is known that during his life Bruce always carried a weapon. X1 was found by his recently divorced ex-wife fashion designer Angel Brinks, following a short three-month marriage. His ex-wife, who was nine months pregnant at the time, said he committed suicide after she said something horrible to him.

His first wife Baby Vasquez who he was married to for four years as shown in public records, had X1's first son Justyle Sandlin. Baby has vocalized questions regarding his alleged suicide saying she believes he could have been set up.

Nevada public records show X1 was not married at the time of his death yet Angel lied on record claiming they were married at the time of his death which has been proven false information. Angel says, "my son's father committed suicide when I was 9 months pregnant. I found him and I couldn't really enjoy the birth of my son, but mourn a loss of my husband at the time." He was 28 years old. Hip-hop website AllHipHop.com was the first to write about the rapper's death. The article came out with the headline "Sticky Fingaz Brother/Rapper X1 Found Dead In Las Vegas." On July 19, 2007, Bruce’s second son was born. As of now, X1's sons have not yet met.

== Discography ==
=== Albums ===
- Young, Rich and Gangsta (2006)

=== Mixtapes ===
- It’s a New Era Vol.1 (2005)
- It’s a New Era Vol.2 (2005)
- The Connect (with DJ Snake Eyes) (2007)

=== Soundtracks ===
- A Day in the Life (2009)

=== Singles ===
- I'll Murder You (with Gang Green) (1995)
- Everywhere We Go (feat. Lil' Flip) (2006)

=== Videos ===
- I'll Murder You (with Gang Green) (1995)
- Walk in New York (with Onyx) (1995)
- Broke Willies (with Onyx) (1998)
- React (feat. 50 Cent, Bonifucco and Still Livin, with Onyx)
- Shut 'Em Down (feat. DMX, with Onyx)
- The Worst (feat. Wu-Tang Clan and Killa Sin, with Onyx)
- Everywhere We Go (feat. Lil' Flip) (2006)

=== Films ===
- Def Jam Survival of the Illest — Live from 125 N.Y.C. (1998)
- Onyx: 15 Years of Videos, History and Violence (2008)
- A Day in the Life (2009)
