= Snowmads =

SnowMads

Studio album by Onyx
- Released: November 15, 2019
- Recorded: 2018–2019
- Studio: Steakhouse Recording Studios (Los Angeles, California); A2Z Studio (Prague, Czech Republic)
- Genre: East Coast hip-hop; hardcore hip-hop
- Length: 43:53
- Label: Goon MuSick
- Producer: DJ Illegal (exec.); Fredro Starr (exec.); Snowgoons; Tengo

Onyx chronology
Black Rock (2018)	SnowMads (2019)

Singles from SnowMads
- 1. "Ain't No Time To Rest" Released: September 16, 2019; 2. "Kill Da Mic" Released: November 13, 2019; 3. "Mad Shoot Outs" Released: December 13, 2019; 4. "Rat Tat Tat" Released: March 7, 2020; 5. "Street Art" Released: April 16, 2020

Professional ratings
Review scores
Source	Rating
UndergroundHipHopBlog	8/10 stars
HipHopDX	3.7/5

SnowMads is the eighth studio album by American hip-hop group Onyx, released on November 15, 2019 via Goon MuSick.

The album is entirely produced by Snowgoons. This is not the first time the two groups have worked together. Five years prior, Snowgoons had forced Onyx to release the LP #WakeDaFucUp, which was named as one of the best hip-hop albums of 2014 by XXL. Over the course of 5 years, Onyx had collaborated several times with Snowgoons and had also performed in Europe together. SnowMads included 15 tracks and guest appearances from rappers Bumpy Knuckles, Nems, Knuckles (N.B.S.), Quadro, Ufo Fev, SickFlo, Flee Lord and Dope D.O.D.

== Critical response ==
In his review of the album for UndergroundHipHopBlog, Legends Will Never Die rated the album 8 out of 10 and added: "I’ve been wanting a #WAKEDAFUCUP follow-up for a while now & I’m finally glad they did it. Some of the features I could do without, but the Snowgoons‘ raw production yet again fits the duo’s cutthroat lyricism".

In his review of the album for HipHopDX, Riley Wallace rated the album 3.7 out of 5 and added: "This isn’t a perfect album, but in a year that’s seen some of the genre’s most revered icons treat fans to gems worthy of their collections, Sticky and Fredro provide a polished slice of refined, hard-edged Hip Hop — the same flavor that birthed some of the game’s grimiest (whether they get roses for it or not)."

The album was chosen as "The best rap album of 2019" by the Russian website Rap.Ru, as well as "one of the best rap albums of 2019" by the editors of the Russian website HipHop4Real. The album was featured on a Russian late-night talk show Evening Urgant hosted by Ivan Urgant on Channel One, where Onyx performed their most famous hit "Slam", as well as on the Bulgarian show Шоуто на Николаос Цитиридис on bTV, where members of the group gave an interview and performed the song "Kill Da Mic".

== Singles ==
On September 16, 2019, Onyx released "Ain't No Time To Rest" (feat. Dope D.O.D.) as the first single from the upcoming album SnowMads entirely produced by Snowgoons. On October 27, 2019, was released a video for the song "Ain't No Time To Rest", and it was also announced that a new album would be released on November 8. In an interview for FileUnderHipHop DJ Illegal from Snowgoons announced a new release date for the album - November 15. On November 10, 2019, the group released a video for the song "Kill Da Mic" and three days later a self-titled single was released on digital platforms. Onyx has released a new visual for their single "Monsters Gorillas" (featuring Knuckles) on November 29. The third single from the album, "Mad Shoot Outs", was released on December 13. A new video for the song "Hoodies Down" was released on January 7, 2020. The fourth single "Rat Tat Tat" (feat. Quadro & Ufo Fev) was released on March 7, 2020. The fifth single "Street Art" (feat. SickFlo) was released on digital platforms on April 16, 2020.

== Track listing ==
#	Title	Length
01.	"SnowMads Intro"	0:41
02.	"Who Da Fuc"	2:31
03.	"Robbing Hip Hop" (feat. Bumpy Knuckles & Nems)	4:01
04.	"Monsters Gorillas" (feat. Knuckles (N.B.S.))	3:42
05.	"Rat Tat Tat" (feat. Quadro & Ufo Fev)	3:13
06.	"Hoodies Down"	2:47
07.	"Kill Da Mic"	2:56
08.	"Street Art" (feat. SickFlo)	3:09
09.	"Trolling" (feat. Knuckles (N.B.S.))	2:26
10.	"Ringolevio"	3:05
11.	"Built Like That"	2:49
12.	"Mad Shoot Outs" (feat. Flee Lord)	3:26
13.	"I Got The Tec-9"	2:32
14.	"Ain't No Time To Rest" (feat. Dope D.O.D.)	3:50
15.	"Good Fight" (Bonus Track)	2:37
