= Cold Case Files: Vol. 1 =

2008 compilation album by Onyx

Compilation album by Onyx
- Released: August 19, 2008
- Recorded: 1992–2003
- Genre: East Coast hip-hop; gangsta rap; hardcore hip-hop
- Length: 54:45
- Label: Iceman
- Producer: Omar "Iceman" Sharif (exec.); Fredro Starr; Jam Master Jay; Keith Horne; Self; Kronic Tones; Dominche

Onyx chronology
Triggernometry (2003)	Cold Case Files: Vol. 1 (2008)	Cold Case Files: Vol. 2 (2012)

Cold Case Files: Vol. 1 is a compilation album by American hardcore rap group Onyx released on August 19, 2008, by Iceman Music Group. This compilation contains singles and lost studio recordings from the group's albums.

The album was produced by Jam Master Jay, Fredro Starr, Kronic Tones, Dominche, Self and Keith Horne. The album features guest appearances from Method Man, X1, Panama P.I., Smoothe da Hustler, Trigger tha Gambler, D.V. Alias Khrist, All City, Still Livin', Gang Green, Whosane and Chocolate.

== Background ==
After conquering Hollywood, Onyx return to the scene, emerging from their musical vaults with a new album, Cold Case Files, a 16-track collection of previously unreleased songs executive produced by the members of Onyx and Omar "Iceman" Sharif. The collection features underground singles, lost studio recordings from the group's first three albums, and appearances from Method Man, deceased Onyx affiliate X1, and Gang Green. According to the group, revisiting these sessions also served as a tribute to fallen soldiers Jam Master Jay, X1, Big DS, and all Onyx affiliates who have passed away in the last five years; some of which are still unsolved murders.

Fredro's younger brother, Whosane, archived most of the unreleased tracks. Sonny Seeza, who served as album supervisor shares, "Whosane was usually in the studio with us and kept all our classic recordings that never made it onto albums in the Onyx music vault; so when the time came to select tracks for Cold Case Files, he had tracks that we didn't even know existed on everything from cassettes, DATs, CDs to 2-inch reels. According to Fredro Starr, Onyx has at least 60 tracks, and this is just the first volume of unheard material. DJ Infinite, one of Fredro's good friends, came up with the idea to make this album:

"...We wanted to put something out for the fans, especially the true Onyx fans. DJ Infinite, one of my good friends and associates came up with the idea of doing this album and putting out some of these tracks. So my brother Whosane had the cassettes and the DATs saved from back in the days and we just transferred all that into the digital age and now you got the Cold Case album."

== Critical response ==
Professional ratings
Review scores
Source	Rating
HipHopDX	3.00/5 stars
AllHipHop.com	5.50/10 stars
AllMusic	3.5/5 stars
UG Rap	7.5/10 stars
BoomBapReviews	4.0/5 stars

RomanCooper of HipHopDX gave the album three stars out of five, saying "...This album is easily worth copping – if you're an Onyx fan. If you're not familiar with their music, you'd be much better served scooping up either Bacdafucup or All We Got Iz Us. Cold Case Files doesn't really manage to distinguish itself from common issues associated with compilation albums. That being said, even cuts that didn't make Onyx's albums manage to bring you back to the gritty early 1990s. With a gem or two nestled among these tracks, fans of that sound may want to check this.".

Tika Milan of AllHipHop.com gave the album 5.5 stars out of 10, noting that many of the songs sound so similar that if you don't pay attention, it's hard to tell where one ends and the other begins. The production is built on simple basement beats: a drum machine, a few keyboard chords, and a looped sample or two.

== Track listing ==
#	Title	Featured guest(s)	Producer(s)	Samples	Length	Year
01.	"U.S.G."		Jam Master Jay		0:15	1992
02.	"Ghetto Way Of Thinking"		Fredro Starr		4:40	1995
03.	"O.N.Y.X."		Kronic Tones; Dominche (co-producer)	"You're A Big Girl Now" by The Stylistics	3:21	2003
04.	"See U In Hell Pt. 2 (Freestyle)"	X1		"I Loves You, Porgy" by Nina Simone	3:22	1998
05.	"Evil Streets (Remix)"	Method Man; Panama P.I.	Fredro Starr	"Georgia Rose" by Esther Phillips; "Vamos A Rapiar" by Main Source	4:13	1994
06.	"Rock U"		Fredro Starr		4:14	1996
07.	"Hydro"		Keith Horne		3:06	1996
08.	"Purse Snatchaz Pt. 2"	Smoothe Da Hustler; Trigger Tha Gambler; D.V. Alias Khrist	Fredro Starr	"Love Is My Life" by Jimmy McGriff	3:32	1994
9.	"Wili'n Wili'n"	All City; X1; Still Livin'			4:08	1998
10.	"See You In Hell (Freestyle)"			"American Fruit, African Roots" by Zulema	3:39	1997
11.	"I'll Murda U (Remix)"	Gang Green	Fredro Starr	"Candy Man Blues" by Ten Wheel Drive; "Handclapping Song" by The Meters	3:43	1995
12.	"Mad World"	Whosane; X1	Self		4:16	1997
13.	"I Don't Want To Die"	Chocolate	Keith Horne	"I Believe I Can Fly" by R. Kelly	3:47	1997
14.	"Return Of The Madface"		Kronic Tones	"Donna" by Gerome Ragni	3:22	2003
15.	"Candy Man"	X1	Fredro Starr	"Candy Man Blues" by Ten Wheel Drive	2:12	1995
16.	"Hard To Be A Thug"		Sticky Fingaz		3:09	1999

== Personnel ==
Credits for Cold Case Files: Vol. 1 adapted from AllMusic and CD booklet.

- Onyx — performer, vocals
- Fredro Starr — performer, vocals, executive producer
- Sticky Fingaz — performer, vocals, executive producer
- Sonny Seeza — performer, vocals, executive producer
- Omar "Iceman" Sharif — executive producer
- Method Man — guest artist
- X1 — guest artist
- Panama P.I. — guest artist
- Smoothe da Hustler — guest artist
- Trigger Tha Gambler — guest artist
- D.V. Alias Khrist — guest artist
- All City — guest artist
- Still Livin' — guest artist
- Gang Green — guest artist
- Whosane — guest artist
- Chocolate — guest artist
- Jam Master Jay — producer
- Kronic Tones — producer
- Dominche — producer
- Self — producer
- Keith Horne — producer
- DJ Infinite — associate producer
- Salvatore "Dagrind" Mula — A&R
- David Rivera — A&R
- Dagrind Entertainment — A&R
- Whosane — album supervisor
- Inkpen — art direction, design

== Cold Case Files: Vol. 2 ==
Cold Case Files: Vol. 2

Compilation album by Onyx
- Released: August 10, 2012
- Recorded: 1993–1999
- Genre: East Coast hip-hop; hardcore hip-hop
- Length: 66:51
- Label: Major Independents
- Producer: Keith Horne; Onyx; 8-Off Assassin; 3rd Eye; Jam Master Jay

Onyx chronology
Cold Case Files: Vol. 1 (2008)	Cold Case Files: Vol. 2 (2012)	#WakeDaFucUp (2014)

Cold Case Files Vol. 2 is a compilation album by American hip-hop group Onyx released on August 10, 2012 by Major Independents. Physical copies became available on January 23, 2014. The album contained unreleased tracks from the group's first three albums, Bacdafucup, All We Got Iz Us and Shut 'Em Down.

The album was produced by Keith Horne, Onyx, 8-Off Assassin, 3rd Eye (a.k.a. Jesse West) and Jam Master Jay. The album features guest appearances from Naughty By Nature, Biggie Smalls, 3rd Eye (a.k.a. Jesse West), Gang Green (X1, Sife, Still Livin'), All City (Greg Valentine), Jared "Choclatt" Crawford и Tracy "Sunshiine" Woodall.

== Background ==
One of the main findings of this collection was the never released before track "Flip Dat Shit". In January 1993, at the recording studio The Hit Factory in NYC, rappers Naughty By Nature, Onyx, Chyskillz, Jam Master Jay, Biggie Smalls, Puff Daddy and producer/rapper Jesse West (also known as 3rd Eye) joined together to record a track "Flip That Shit" special for the soundtrack to the new movie "Who's the Man?". Many years later, fans were still able to hear the track "Flip That Shit" thanks to DJ JS1, who passed this digitized tape to Sticky Fingaz, who added this track to the collection of unreleased songs of Onyx's "Cold Case Files Vol. 2"

The track "To All Ya'll Crews, Whatever", which was not included on the album "All We Got Iz Us", was leaked on Onyx's website in CD quality on March 22, 2016. Earlier, this track was released on Cold Case Files Vol. 2 in poorly digitized cassette quality.

== Critical reception ==
Professional ratings
Review scores
Source	Rating
Rate Your Music	3.16/5 stars
Sputnikmusic	2.5/5 stars
BoomBapReviews	4.0/5 stars

BOOM BAP REVIEWS gave this release a good response saying "The important thing is that Onyx actually took the bold step and we're here now with yet another Onyx collection that appealed. So, is it any good? The very nature of this project should be a godsend to Onyx fans. Plus, for the assholes out there, they're simply telling you to buy it for free. And besides, 6 crap songs out of 16 is still a bargain, right? Right?!".

== Track listing ==
#	track	featured guest(s)	producer(s)	sample(s)	length	year
01.	"Set It Str8"	X1; Sife (a.k.a. Certified from Gang Green)		"Mystique Blues" by The Crusaders (1971)	3:55	1997
02.	"Kidz From Queens"	Still Livin'		"The World Is a Ghetto" by War (1972)	3:41	1995
03.	"Bring It" (also known as "Hey!") (The Philadelphia Flyers half time anthem)		Keith Horne	"Rock 'N Roll, Part 2" by Gary Glitter (1972)	4:02	1998
04.	"Hi Hoe"			"What Are You Doing The Rest Of Your Life" by Cal Tjader (1971)	3:03	1997
05.	"Crime Stories"			"Throw Ya Gunz" by Onyx (1992)	4:41	1997
06.	"Punk Motherfukaz" (Full Length)		Onyx; 8-Off Assassin (co-producer)	"Long Red" by Mountain (1972)	4:40	1995
07.	"To All Ya'll Crews, Whatever"		Onyx	"The Breakdown (Part II)" by Rufus Thomas (1971); "Here 'N' Now" by Onyx (1993)	3:20	1995
08.	"Anything Goes"		Onyx	"Foxy Lady" by Jimi Hendrix (1967); "Come Together" by The Beatles (1969)	3:20	1997
9.	"Give It All You Got"	Greg Valentine		"Risin' To The Top" by Keni Burke (1982)	3:43	1999
10.	"Flip Dat Shit"	Naughty By Nature; Biggie Smalls; 3rd Eye (a.k.a. Jesse West)	3rd Eye	"Nautilus" by Bob James (1974); "16 Bars" (Live at the Lyricist Lounge) by Biggie Smalls (1993)	4:10	1993
11.	"Pussy On The Regular"		Keith Horne	"Coldblooded" by James Brown (1974)	4:03	1997
12.	"Take That" (Full Version)		Keith Horne	piano from "Rhapsody Rabbit" (1946)	4:03	1996
13.	"Raze It Up" (Demo version with different lyrics)		Keith Horne	piano from Yusef Lateef; drums from "Uphill Peace of Mind" by Kid Dynamite; drums from "Flava In Ya Ear" by Craig Mack; bassline from Ohio Players	4:03	1996
14.	"Love Of Money '96" (Unreleased rock version with different lyrics)	X1; Chocolate		"Repent Walpurgis" by Procol Harum (1967); "For The Love of Money" by The O'Jays (1973)	4:55	1996
14b.	"You Must Be Outta Your Mind"	X1; Sunshine			3:44	1997
15.	"We Comin' Thru Ya'll" (a similar beat was used later on "Broke Willies")		Keith Horne	"Miss You" by The Rolling Stones (1978)	3:57	1997
16.	"Walk In New York" (Jam Master Jay original "working" version with different beat and some different lyrics)		Jam Master Jay		3:18	1995

Notes:

- Information about samples was taken from WhoSampled.

== Personnel ==
Credits for Cold Case Files: Vol. 2 adapted from CD booklet.

- Onyx — performer, vocals, producer
- Fredro Starr — performer, vocals
- Sticky Fingaz — performer, vocals, executive producer
- Sonny Seeza — performer, vocals
- Naughty By Nature — guest artist
- Biggie Smalls — guest artist
- 3rd Eye (a.k.a. Jesse West) — guest artist
- Gang Green — guest artist
- X1 — guest artist
- Sife — guest artist
- Still Livin' — guest artist
- All City — guest artist
- Greg Valentine — guest artist
- Jared "Choclatt" Crawford — guest artist
- Tracy "Sunshiine" Woodall — guest artist
- Keith Horne — producer
- Jam Master Jay — producer
- 8-Off Assassin — producer
- 3rd Eye (a.k.a. Jesse West) — producer
- Paul Scavone — associate producer, album supervisor
