= Sunset Park (film) =

1996 film directed by Steve Gomer

- Theatrical release poster
- Directed by: Steve Gomer
- Written by: Seth Zvi Rosenfeld; Kathleen McGhee-Anderson
- Produced by: Danny DeVito; Michael Shamberg; Dan Paulson
- Starring: Rhea Perlman
- Cinematography: Robbie Greenberg
- Edited by: Arthur Coburn
- Music by: Miles Goodman; Kay Gee
- Production companies: Jersey Films; TriStar Pictures
- Distributed by: Sony Pictures Releasing
- Release date: April 26, 1996
- Running time: 99 minutes
- Country: United States
- Language: English
- Box office: $10,163,782

Sunset Park is a 1996 American sports comedy drama film directed by Steve Gomer, based upon a screenplay by Seth Zvi Rosenfeld and Kathleen McGhee-Anderson. The film stars Rhea Perlman as Phyllis Saroka, the head coach of a high school boys basketball team from the Sunset Park neighborhood in New York City. The film also stars Onyx rapper Fredro Starr and features an early film appearance from Terrence Howard. It was produced by Perlman's husband Danny DeVito, along with Michael Shamberg and Dan Paulson.

Filming took place in New York City. Included in filming locations were various high schools and public buildings as well as the world-famous Madison Square Garden. The Sunset Park soundtrack featured one of the first solo appearances of Ghostface Killah. Sunset Park was released on April 26, 1996 and went on to gross about $10 million at the box office.

== Plot ==
Phyllis Saroka is a P.E. teacher at Sunset Park High School in New York City, who reads a flyer that her school is looking for a new boys basketball coach. Looking for more money to pursue opening a restaurant on St. Croix, Virgin Islands, she decides to give the job a shot despite knowing nothing of basketball. She contacts the correct people and is given the job.

Phyllis shows up for her first day on the job and the team is already skeptical of her. When she walks in, she lets basketball players run the team, calling their own fouls, running their own plays and basically allowing them to be carefree. During a game, she makes some bad decisions which irks some of the players on the team. This inspires her to learn more about the game with the assistance of her players. They help her and the team begins to slowly find success.

The team also has to deal with outside forces that threaten the team. Tyrik "Shorty Doo-Wop" Russell is on probation and eventually gets into more trouble. Bernard "Spaceman" Williams is also on probation, is constantly using drugs and has trouble with teacher Morris Bernstein. Leonard "Busy-Bee" Mutumbo gets shot during the season and misses several games. Several other players are having academic trouble and some don't even get along with each other. The team also find out that Phyllis only plans to stay with them one season and then leave to open a restaurant.

The team eventually comes together despite their differences and troubles. They end up with very successful season and get into the city championship. They go to Madison Square Garden to face their opponent Washington Heights and lose by a small margin. Afterward, Phyllis informs them that they should be proud of themselves and that she will return next season.

== Cast ==
- Rhea Perlman as Phyllis Saroka, a physical education coach who takes a job coaching boys basketball at Sunset Park.
- Fredro Starr as Tyrik "Shorty Doo-Wop" Russell, the point guard and leader of the Sunset Park basketball team.
- Carol Kane as Mona, Phyllis' best friend who supports all of Phyllis' decisions.
- Terrence DaShon Howard as Bernard "Spaceman" Williams, a care-free, weed smoking, quiet member of the team and a close friend of Shorty.
- Camille Saviola as Barbara, a lawyer and friend of Phyllis.
- De'aundre Bonds as Leonard "Busy-Bee" Mutumbo, the undersized youngest player on the team.
- James Harris as James "Butter" Radar, the main post player on the team. He constantly brags about how many women he has and has had in the past.
- Anthony Hall as Andre Johnson, a member of the team who takes a free throw at Madison Square Garden.
- Antwon Tanner as Dante "Drano" Al-Hassan, a guard who at first is scared to shoot the ball despite having good shooting skills.
- Shawn Michael Howard as Kurt, an unmotivated member of the team.
- Garin Casdorph as "Vanilla Thunder ". He comes off the bench to provide highlight reel dunks.
- Guy Torry as "Boo Man", a comedic character and heckler in the crowd during Sunset Park's games.
- Scott Burkholder as Morris Bernstein, a teacher who has conflict with Spaceman.
- John Aprea as Dominic
- John Vargas as Mr. Santiago, the principal that acts as a minor antagonist to both Phyllis and the players.
- Rhonda Stubbins White as Carla
- Hattie Winston as Judge Meyer
- Tracy Vilar as Shirley
- Gary Dourdan as Dreadlock Guy
- Vincent Pastore as Charlie
- Malinda Williams as Cheryl

== Reception ==
The film has a 13% rating on Rotten Tomatoes.

== See also ==
- List of basketball films
- List of hood films
