= React (Onyx song) =

Single by Onyx featuring 50 Cent, Bonifucco, Still Livin' and X1

from the album Shut 'Em Down
- B-side: "Broke Willies"; "Shut 'Em Down (Remix)"
- Released: June 2, 1998
- Studio: Track Record Studios, North Hollywood, Los Angeles
- Genre: East Coast hip-hop; hardcore hip-hop
- Length: 4:26
- Label: JMJ; Def Jam; Rush
- Songwriters: Fred Scruggs; Kirk Jones; Tyrone Taylor; Stephen Anderson; Bruce Sandlin
- Producer: Bud'da

Onyx singles chronology
"Shut 'Em Down" (1998)	"React" (1998)	"Broke Willies / Ghetto Starz" (1998)

50 Cent singles chronology
"React" (1998)	"How to Rob" (1999)

Music video
- "React" on YouTube

"React" is a song by American hip hop group Onyx. It was released on June 2, 1998, by JMJ Records, Rush Associated Labels and Def Jam as the third single from Onyx's third album, Shut 'Em Down. The song featured Onyx affiliates X1, Bonifucco and Still Livin' and then-unknown 50 Cent in his first official appearance on a song.

Produced by Bud'da, React was successful on the R&B and rap charts, peaking at 62 on the US Billboard's Hot R&B/Hip-Hop Singles & Tracks and 44 on the US Hot Rap Singles.

Allmusic highlighted the song itself when they reviewed the album.

== Background ==
50 Cent mentioned Jam Master Jay as the man who put him on a song, during his book From Pieces to Weight: Once Upon a Time in Southside, Queens:

"...Jam Master Jay got me on a song called "React". At the time we did a song, no one expected it to be a single. They just put me on the song as a favor to Jay because I was the new nigga in his camp.

== Music video ==
"React" was the first music video directed by Canadian filmmaker Director X; and it premiered on "Rap City" aired on BET on June 13, 1998. The video concept called for rappers to be hockey players. 50 Cent spoke on his appearance in the video "React" when asked about the last time he went ice-skating.

"...It actually was the Onyx video. I had to learn for the video. I didn't know why. I was like 'What the—?' I asked them to put me in the box. Like an actual [penalty box]".

The video can be found on the 2008's DVD Onyx: 15 Years Of Videos, History And Violence.

== Controversy ==
The beef between Onyx and 50 Cent started on Def Jam's "Survival Of The Illest" concert at the legendary world-famous Apollo Theater. The concert was held on July 18, 1998. During performing the song "React" rapper Scarred 4 Life (also known as Clay Da Raider) performed 50 Cent's verse. Later, 50 would diss Sticky Fingaz on a number of mixtapes, including 50's underground hit "How To Rob". Then he would fight with Fredro at the rehearsal for the 2003 VIBE Awards. In a 2008 interview for AllHipHop Fredro Starr made a comment about 50 Cent:

"...50 is a smart businessman and at the end of the day we gave him respect. We put him on records when we was at the top of the game. He didn't even have a car. We gave him respect on the strength of Jam Master Jay. What did we get in return? Someone talking slick on mixtapes? Swinging on n****s?"

== Releases ==
=== 12" vinyl single track listing ===
A-Side:

1. "React" (Radio Edit) - 4:25 (Featuring 50 Cent, Bonifucco, Still Livin, X1 [Uncredited])
2. "Broke Willies" (Radio Edit) - 4:08 (Featuring X1 [Uncredited])
3. "Shut 'Em Down" (Remix)- 4:07 (Featuring Big Pun, Noreaga)

B-Side:

1. "React" (TV track)- 4:26
2. "Broke Willies" (TV Track) - 4:09
3. "Shut 'Em Down" (Remix) (TV Track) - 4:07

=== CD promo single track listing ===
1. "React" (Radio Edit)- 4:26 (Featuring 50 Cent, Bonifucco, Still Livin, X1 [Uncredited])
2. "Broke Willies" (Radio Edit)- 4:11 (Featuring X1 [Uncredited])
3. "Shut 'Em Down (Remix)" (Radio Edit)- 4:02 (Featuring Big Pun, Noreaga)

Notes

- The single version of "Broke Willies" is very different in music from the album version.

== Samples ==
- "Eastside Connection" by Frisco Disco

Notes

- LL Cool J is the first rap artist who used the same sample in his 1985 song "You'll Rock" (Remix) produced by Rick Rubin.

== Personnel ==
- Onyx - performer, vocals, co-producer ("Broke Willies")
- Fredro Starr - performer, vocals
- Sticky Fingaz - performer, vocals
- Sonny Seeza - performer, vocals
- Bud'da - producer ("React")
- Keith Horne - producer ("Broke Willies")
- Don Elliot - engineer ("Broke Willies")
- Self - producer ("Shut 'Em Down (Remix)")
- Ken "DURO" Ifill - engineer, mixing
- DJ LS One - engineer, mixing, scratches
- Patrick Viala - remixing ("Shut 'Em Down (Remix)")
- Tony Black - mixing, remixing ("Shut 'Em Down (Remix)")
- Tom Coyne - mastering

== Charts ==
=== Weekly charts ===
Chart	Position
US Hot R&B/Hip-Hop Singles & Tracks (Billboard)	62
US Hot Rap Singles (Billboard)	44
