= Shotgunz in Hell =

Shotgunz In Hell

Studio album by Onyx & Dope D.O.D.
- Released: May 29, 2017
- Recorded: 2014–2016
- Genre: East Coast hip-hop; hardcore hip-hop; dubstep; EDM
- Length: 36:30
- Label: Onyx & Dope D.O.D.
- Producer: Onyx (exec.); Dope D.O.D. (exec.); Perry Papadakos (assoc prod.); Tjibz; Nightwatch; Peter Songolo Cookin' Soul; Ezra; Bananaz; Chubeats

Onyx & Dope D.O.D. chronology
Against All Authorities (2015)	Shotgunz In Hell (2017)	Black Rock (2018)

Singles from Shotgunz in Hell
- 1. "XXX" Released: January 9, 2017; 2. "Piro" Released: May 9, 2017

Professional ratings
Review scores
Source	Rating
HipHop4Real	5/5 stars

Shotgunz In Hell is a collaborative studio album by American hardcore hip-hop group Onyx and Dutch hardcore hip-hop group Dope D.O.D., released on May 29, 2017, by Onyx & Dope D.O.D. Records. Physical copies of the album became available on July 15, 2017. The album was produced by Dutch producers Tjibz, Nightwatch, Peter Songolo (Jay Reaper's brother), Ezra, Bananaz and Chubeats, and Spanish producer Cookin' Soul. The album features appearances by American rappers Sick Flo, Snak the Ripper, Dope D.O.D.'s ex-member Dopey Rotten and DJ Nelson.

== Background ==
Onyx first met the group Dope D.O.D. at the "Urbano Festival" in France on June 29, 2012, where both groups performed. After the performance Dope D.O.D.'s Skits Vicious hooked up with Onyx's Fredro Starr and exchanged phone numbers. Fredro Starr remembers the day he first heard the group Dope D.O.D.:

"...I was overseas doing a show by myself. It's crazy cuz Sticky was doing a movie... But, there were these kids coming on before me. I'm in my dressing room. I never heard of them before. They music all crazy, niggas is wylin'. So I leave my dressing room to see them perform, which I don't normally do... After they had got off stage and shit, they were all 'Yo, Fredro. You a legend' we put one in the air and vibed out. Once we vibed out, we just had that connection. They just reminded me of a young Onyx."

In the same year, both groups recorded a joint track "Panic Room" for the second album of Dope D.O.D. "Da Roach" released on April 19, 2013. The second joint track was "WakeDaFucUp", which became the title track for the next Onyx's album "#WakeDaFucUp" released on March 18, 2014. Then both groups decided to release an EP. Skits Vicious shares his memories:

"...We were actually thinking of this before I spoke with Fredro. Fredro hit me up and said 'Let's do an EP together'. That was his initiative."

== Conception of album title ==
"Shotgun" is to inhale from a pipe or other smoking device, followed shortly by an exhalation into someone else's mouth. This term was developed by US troops in Vietnam, who actually would put a marijuana cigarette ("spliff") into the open chamber of an unloaded shotgun and blow it into each other's faces. An example of this can be seen in the movie Platoon directed by Oliver Stone about The Vietnam War (1957–1975). According to the movie the word "hell" US soldiers called "Vietnam". Nas was the first rapper who used this phrase "Shotguns In Hell" in his song "It Ain't Hard to Tell". Fredro came up with the name for the album.

"...Tell you the truth, I came up with the title... I remember Nas line 'shotguns in hell', he was talking about the weed perspective of it when you give somebody a shotgun or whatever. But.. I don't know, it kinda just stuck in my head. I was like 'let's name our album that'. We tried coming up with titles afterward, but 'Shotgunz in Hell' was just too ill."

== Singles ==
"XXX" is the first single from "Shotgunz In Hell" produced by Tjibz was released on January 9, 2017. The second single "Piro" featuring Dope D.O.D.'s ex-member Dopey Rotten was released on May 9, 2017.

== Videos ==
Onyx and Dope D.O.D. released 3 music videos from this album: "XXX", "Piro", "Don't Sleep". Onyx dropped visuals for the song "XXX" via Noisey. The video shows members of Dope D.O.D., Skit Vicious and Jay Reaper, along with Onyx, Sticky Fingaz and Fredro Starr, mean mugging through the streets of LA. The video was shot in Los Angeles by Andres Fouche on March 12, 2016. The second video "Piro" was made in the form of animation by a Dutch graphic designer Martijn Bosgraaf. The third video "Don't Sleep" was released on the album release day.

== Track listing ==
#	track	featured guest(s)	producer(s)	scratches	length
01.	"Shotgunz in Hell (Intro)"		Tjibz	DJ Friss	1:42
02.	"Can't Hear You"	Sick Flo	Peter Songolo	DJ Friss	4:12
03.	"XXX"		Tjibz		3:14
04.	"Piro"	Dopey Rotten	Nightwatch	DJ Nelson	2:45
05.	"Spit in Ya Face"		Cookin' Soul		2:41
06.	"Doomsday"		Ezra		3:04
07.	"Die Slow"		Bananaz		2:56
08.	"What's Your Drug of Choice? (Skit)"		Bananaz		1:35
09.	"Don't Sleep"		Peter Songolo		2:57
10.	"Psychopath"	Snak the Ripper	Chubeats		3:05
11.	"Playa"		Peter Songolo		3:52
12.	"The Body (Skit)"		Chubeats		1:15
13.	"Stacking"		Peter Songolo		3:12
