= Triggernometry =

Triggernometry may refer to:

- Triggernometry (podcast), a British podcast
- Triggernometry (album), by Onyx
