= Dance 360 =

American competition television series

- Genre: Hip-hop, music, Reality television, game show
- Developed by: Claude Brooks
- Directed by: Richard Brian DiPirro
- Presented by: Fredro Starr; Kel Mitchell
- Theme music composer: Chris Taylor
- Country of origin: United States
- Original language: English
- No. of episodes: 65

Production
- Executive producers: Claude Brooks; Ralph Farquhar
- Production companies: C to the B Productions; Regan Jon Productions; Paramount Domestic Television

Original release
- Network: Syndication, UPN
- Release: August 30, 2004 – May 2005

Dance 360 (2004–2005) was a modern hip-hop television series that aired on UPN in which different dancers competed to win 360 dollars, an Xbox or a cell phone from Boost Mobile, and a Fuse Sunbird scooter. Sometimes, clothing gear from Ecko Unlimited or Meoshe Sport was awarded. It was hosted by Fredro Starr and Kel Mitchell with DJ K-Sly providing the beats for the dancers.

The dancers were selected from the audience at the beginning of the show, and they competed one-on-one, with the winner going on to the next round. They were judged by the level of audience applause, according to a noise meter. In addition to the prizes awarded, the winner was also given the last few seconds of the show to give "shout-outs" to friends and family. The show's title comes from the circle on the dance floor where the dancers competed.

The first battle starts with Kel previewing the battle, "Tag Ya Man!", then points to one of the dancers to start after K-sly plays a beat, and another person comes to the dance floor and dance. The two people go for a face-to-face dance battle. The three people will be voted to go to the second battle.

The second battle is called, "Master the Move." The hosts, including a special guest from a radio station, will pick three people from the audience to dance a move of their own. Each of the contestants has to perform one of these dances. Two people will be voted to move on to the final battle of the show. If two dancers are tied with the same lower score, they will have to go head-to-head.

The third and final battle features two dancers dancing solo in two rounds with two different beats, and then go head-to-head. At the end, the audience decided who is the winner is by looking at videotapes of the dancers.

The program aired for one season in 2004 until cancellation in 2005 due to Paramount head executives being changed and new executives did not see the vision .

The show was filmed and located at Hollywood Center Studios in Hollywood, Area Of Los Angeles, California, USA.

Both hosts later starred in the straight-to-DVD film, Ganked in 2005.

== Notable competitors ==
Actress Caity Lotz, who is known for her role as Sara Lance / White Canary in The CW's Arrowverse television series, and has appeared in Arrow, Legends of Tomorrow, The Flash, and Supergirl, competed in the competition in 2004 when she was 18 years old. Tiffany Haddish also appeared on an episode. Also Sheik Kargbo of Beast Games ref- https://m.imdb.com/title/tt31812476/mediaviewer/rm3557072642/?ref_=tt_ph_1_2 Dance 360 ref- https://m.imdb.com/title/tt0407378/
