= Bacdafucup: Part II =

Album by Onyx

Studio album by Onyx
- Released: July 9, 2002 (US)
- Recorded: 2001–2002
- Studio: OPM Studios (Los Angeles, California)
- Genre: East Coast hip-hop; hardcore hip-hop
- Length: 48:58
- Label: Koch
- Producer: Fredro Starr (exec.); Sticky Fingaz (exec.); Omar "Iceman" Sharif (exec.); Davinci; DR Period; Havoc; Self; Ant Boogie; Co-Stars; Scott Storch

Onyx chronology
Shut 'Em Down (1998)	Bacdafucup: Part II (2002)	Triggernometry (2003)

Singles from Bacdafucup: Part II
- 1. "Hold Up" Released: 2002; 2. "Big Trucks/Bring 'Em Out Dead" Released: 2002; 3. "Slam Harder/Hold Up" Released: 2002; 4. "Slam Harder/Bring 'Em Out Dead" Released: 2002

Bacdafucup: Part II is the fourth studio album from rap group Onyx, released on July 9, 2002, by Koch Records. The album was produced by Davinci, DR Period, Havoc, Self, Ant Boogie, Co-Stars, Scott Storch. The album features appearances by American rappers X1, Still Livin', Versatile, Platinum Plus and Felisa Marisol.

Bacdafucup: Part II debuted at number 46 on the US Billboard 200, number 11 on the Top R&B/Hip Hop Albums and number 2 on the Top Independent Albums chart.

== Background ==
Bacdafucup: Part II is the first album released by Onyx after the group left Def Jam Recordings. Onyx returns after Sticky Fingaz, Fredro Starr and Sonny Seeza took time off to do solo albums and become film stars. Onyx made a deal with Koch Records to release one album and came back with the sequel to their very successful debut LP Bacdafucup. Onyx reunited for Bacdafucup: Part II. The album cover even echoes that of the debut, although only the three remaining members of Onyx are featured on the new album. The album consists of 12 new tracks and includes a return to their biggest hit "Slam Harder", the DR Period track uses a clever sample of the theme song from the TV show "Welcome Back, Kotter" to introduce the song and provide melody throughout. However, "Slam Harder" is censored on the album when the rest of the LP is explicit. The song "Feel Me" was recorded on the night of the September 11 attacks and dedicated to the events that happened that day in the USA.

Mobb Deep's Havoc and X1 guest on the new album, contributing to the fast-paced "Hold Up." Other cuts include the ode to females "She's Straight Gangster" and "Gun Clap Music," on which the trio pays tribute to three of its late hip-hop heroes—Fredro Starr apes the Notorious B.I.G.'s style, Sonee Seeza raps like Big Pun, and Sticky Fingaz delivers a 2Pac-esque verse. "We're bringing it back to the streets," Fingaz said in a statement about the new album. "A lot of things that's on the radio nowadays is candy-coated. I'll be listening to radio and I want to hear the hard s***, but it don't exist no more."

Many artists and fans alike cite a lack of creativity for the recent glut of uninspired rap albums. Onyx blames something else: lack of energy. With Bacdaf—up: Part 2, due for a June release, Onyx wants to prove that they are still the kings of hardcore grime. After the relatively lukewarm response to debut solo albums from Starr (2001's Firestarr) and Fingaz (2001's [Black Trash] The Autobiography of Kirk Jones), the group has plenty of motivation to come with another batch of irresistible musical fury.

== Singles ==
Four singles from this album were released: "Hold Up", "Big Trucks/Bring 'Em Out Dead", "Slam Harder/Hold Up" and "Slam Harder/Bring 'Em Out Dead"

== Critical response ==
Professional ratings
Review scores
Source	Rating
AllMusic	3.0/5 stars
RapReviews	5/10 stars
MVRemix	5.5/10 stars
RapArtAge	3.5/5 stars
Sputnikmusic	2.4/5 stars
Oocities	4.5/10 stars

The album mostly received negative reception from critics. Complex claimed that the album and "the passion and energy behind it wasn't nearly as believable as it was back in the early 1990s." MVRemix said of the album in retrospect that "this LP has gotten horrible reviews by critics as well as die hard Onyx fans. After the incredible Sticky Fingaz solo album or the last very dense Onyx LP ("Shut 'Em Down"), this album does seem somewhat lazy and sloppy."

== Accolades ==
In 2012 in the Russian version of the magazine GQ rapper Влади commented on the choice of favorite CDs Макса Коржа, among which was the album Onyx Bacdafucup: Part II. In 2013 Complex put the album in their list A History of Rap Album Sequels. In 2015 LA Weekly put the album in their list The Top 20 Rap Album Sequels of All Time.

Publication	Country	Accolade	Year	Rank
GQ	Russia	ВЫБОР МАКСА КОРЖА: ОЦЕНКА ВЛАДИ	2012	*
Complex	United States	A History of Rap Album Sequels	2013	*
LA Weekly	United States	The Top 20 Rap Album Sequels of All Time	2015	19

== Track listing ==
#	track	featured guest(s)	producer(s)	sample(s)	length
01.	"What's Onyx"		Davinci		2:57
02.	"Bring 'Em Out Dead"		DR Period		3:44
03.	"Slam Harder"	Versatile	DR Period	"Welcome Back" by John Sebastian (1976)	4:38
04.	"Hold Up"	X1	Havoc		4:03
05.	"Bang 2 Dis"		Davinci		4:06
06.	"Gangsta"	X1; Platinum Plus	DR Period		4:19
07.	"Hood Beef"	X1; Still Livin'	Self		3:40
08.	"Big Trucks"		DR Period		4:58
09.	"Clap And Rob 'Em"	Versatile	Ant Boogie	"Rockin' Robin" by Bobby Day (1958)	3:15
10.	"Onyx Is Back"	Felisa Marisol	CoStars	"Fat Boys Are Back" by Fat Boys (1985)	3:32
11.	"Feel Me"		Davinci		5:32
12.	"Wet The Club"		Scott Storch		4:14

=== US edition bonus tracks ===
1. "Hold Up (DJ Infinite Mix)" – 3:54
2. "V-12" (Produced by Davinci) – 4:01

=== Japanese edition bonus tracks ===
1. "Hold Up (Remix)" – 3:54

== Chart positions ==
Chart (2002)	Peak position
US Billboard 200	46
US Top R&B/Hip-Hop Albums (Billboard)	11
US Independent Albums (Billboard)	2
German Albums (Offizielle Top 100)	66
