= Ah, And We Do It Like This =

1990 song by Onyx

Single by Onyx
- Released: April 30, 1990
- Recorded: 1989
- Studio: York Studio (Brooklyn, NY)
- Genre: Hip hop
- Length: 5:05
- Label: Profile
- Songwriters: Tyrone Taylor; Marlon Fletcher; Fred Scruggs
- Producer: B-Wiz

Onyx singles chronology
"Ah, And We Do It Like This" (1990)	"Throw Ya Gunz" (1992)

Professional ratings
Review scores
Source	Rating
Rate Your Music	2.44/5

"Ah, And We Do It Like This" is the debut single by American hip hop group Onyx. It was released on April 30, 1990, by Profile Records.

In February 2012, "Ah, And We Do It Like This" was remastered and included in Arista Records' compilation album Giant Single: The Profile Records Rap Anthology.

== Background ==
In 1989, Onyx signed Jeffrey Harris as their manager, who helped them secure a single deal with the label Profile Records. In 1990, at York Studio in Brooklyn, they recorded their first single, "Ah, And We Do It Like This", which was released to low sales on April 30, 1990, on Profile. The song was produced by Onyx's first producer B-Wiz.

"...That very first record was produced by a producer named B-Wiz. B-Wiz was the first producer of that record. He produced “Ah, And We Do It Like This,” and a lot of the original shit in like ’89, ’87, and ’88 for Onyx."

== Production ==
In Brian Coleman's book Check the Technique, Fredro Starr describes the song as made in a country style:

"...I went down south every summer to visit my grandmother and I kind of picked up a southern accent from my time down there. So when I got back to New York I was rhyming like I was from the south, country style. It was a whole different style. Smoother, and with the country thing. It was about partying, girls in the club, having fun with it."

WEFUNK Radio has marked the song as very jazz influenced, much unlike their later work.

Queens's resident B-1 describes the song as popular in clubs at the time: They first song was “Ahh, And We Do It Like This” on Profile Records. They used to have a different type of style, but that was the style back then. The whole club style.

In Andrew J. Rausch's book I Am Hip-Hop: Conversations on the Music and Culture, Sticky Fingaz said that with this single Onyx is ahead of their time:

"...It wasn't the Onyx sound that we know today, but actually I think they were ahead of their time. They were kind of singing, and that's where hip-hop is at right this second. So they were like 20 years ahead of their time."

According to Fredro, Kool DJ Red Alert played on the radio only instrumental from this single. When Fredro met Red Alert at the club, he asked him why he only played the instrumental, to which Red honestly told him that he just didn't like the lyrics in this song.

== Single track listing ==
=== A-Side ===
1. "Ah, And We Do It Like This" - 5:05
2. "Ah, And We Do It Like This" (Dub Club) - 5:05

=== B-Side ===
1. "Ah, And We Do It Like This" (Dub Vocal) - 5:16
2. "Ah, And We Do It Like This" (Instrumental) - 5:12

== Personnel ==
- Onyx - performer, vocals
- Fredro Starr - performer, vocals
- Suave - performer, vocals
- Big DS - performer, vocals
- Jeffrey Harris - manager, producer
- B-Wiz - producer
- Salah - engineer
