= Onyx (hip-hop group) =

American hip hop group

- Original lineup circa 1993: left to right: Suavé, Big DS, Sticky Fingaz and Fredro Starr

Background information
- Origin: Queens, New York City, U.S.
- Genres: East Coast hip-hop; hardcore hip-hop
- Works: Onyx discography
- Years active: 1988–present
- Labels: JMJ; Rush; Chaos; Def Jam; Armee; MNRK; D3; Goon MuSick; Mad Money Movement; Major Independents; X-Ray; 100 Mad; Profile
- Members: Fredro Starr; Sticky Fingaz
- Past members: Big DS; Sonny Seeza
- Website: onyxhq.com

Onyx is an American hardcore hip hop group from New York City, formed in 1988 by Fredro Starr, Suavé (also known as Sonny Seeza) and the late Big DS. Sticky Fingaz joined the group in 1991.

They are best known for their 1993 platinum hit single "Slam", which The Source magazine described as a song that introduced the art of slam dancing into hip-hop. The group has released eight studio albums, three of which have charted in the Billboard 200 albums chart Top 25. Their debut album, Bacdafucup, has been certified platinum, won Best Rap Album at the Soul Train Music Awards and was selected as one of The Source magazine's 100 Best Rap Albums.

They have been quoted as describing their style as loud screaming, aggression, fighting with each other, stage diving, throwing water, rapping with grimy voices, and bald head fashion.

== History ==
Onyx was formed in 1988 by schoolmates Fredro Starr, Sonny Seeza, and Big DS. They decided to name the band after the onyx stone. The band began recording their first demos in the basement of B-Wiz with drum machine beats from an SP-12. In 1989, Onyx signed Jeffrey Harris as their manager, who helped them secure a contract with the label Profile Records. On April 25, 1990, the group released their first single, Ah, And We Do It Like This, to low sales.

On July 13, 1991, while in a traffic jam at The Jones Beach GreekFest Festival, the band members met music producer Jam Master Jay, who agreed to give them two months to submit a demo to his record company. When the deadline came, Seeza and Big DS couldn't make it to the studio to record the demo, so Jeffrey Harris, the manager of Onyx, asked Fredro to come to the studio with his cousin, Kirk Jones, who at the time was doing a solo career under the name Trop. Fredro and Jones recorded two records for the demo, "Stik 'N' Muve" and "Exercise".

The demo was accepted by Jam Master Jay, who signed the band to his record label, Jam Master Jay Records. Jones subsequently joined the band with the stage name Sticky Fingaz. In 1991 the band lost all of its records when its music producer, B-Wiz, was killed while selling cocaine in Baltimore. Later that year, Onyx hired Chyskillz as its new music producer.

In 1993, Onyx released their debut album, entitled Bacdafucup. The album proved to be successful, receiving a platinum certification from the RIAA and peaked at No. 10 on the Billboard 200, the group's highest debut at that point. In 1998, the album was selected as one of The Source's 100 Best Albums. Three of the album's songs reached the Billboard charts; "Throw Ya Gunz", "Slam", and "Shiftee". Their breakout single, "Slam", was aired on MTV and BET, causing the song to reach No. 4 on the Billboard Hot 100. "Slam" was certified Platinum by the RIAA on August 10, 1993. In 1994, Big DS left the group to start a solo career, producing music under his own record label called Illyotic Music.

In 1995 Onyx released its second album, All We Got Iz Us, and founded its own record label, Armee Records, distributed through MCA Records. Through its record label, the band produced music by Gang Green, All City, Panama P.I., and Choclatt. In April 1995 Marvel Music, a short-lived imprint of Marvel Comics, released a comic book based on the band called "Onyx: Fight!". Written by Karl Bollers and drawn by Larry Lee, the comic depicted a post-apocalyptic New York City where Onyx forms an underground rebellion.

In 1998 the band released their third album Shut 'Em Down, which featured appearances from other bands, including X-1, DMX, 50 Cent, All City, Mr. Cheeks, Wu-Tang Clan, N.O.R.E., and Big Pun. Produced by Keith Horne, Self, and others, the album peaked at No. 10 on the Billboard 200, selling 500,000 units. Three of the album's songs reached the Billboard charts; The Worst, Shut 'Em Down, and React. Shut 'Em Down was Onyx's last album on the Def Jam Recordings label.

In 2001, Onyx released their fourth album, Bacdafucup Part II, through Koch Records. Produced by Davinci, DR Period, and others, the album included twelve new tracks, including "Feel Me", which was recorded on the night of September 11, 2001, and was dedicated to the events that had happened that day. In 2003 Onyx released their fifth album, Triggernometry, consisting of ten new tracks, with eleven stories from the lives the group's members in between the tracks. On May 22, 2003, former Onyx member Big DS died in a hospital in Queens, New York at the age of 31 after receiving chemotherapy for lymphatic cancer.

Onyx released a sixteen-track collection of previously unreleased songs Cold Case Files through Iceman Music Group on August 19, 2008. The collection features underground singles, lost studio recordings from the group's first three albums, and appearances from Method Man, deceased Onyx affiliate X1, and Gang Green.

In 2009, Onyx was planning to release an album called Black Rock, but postponed its release due to the release of another rap album called "Blakroc". The same year, Sonny Seeza left the band to begin a solo career. On October 31, 2012, after having returned from an overseas tour, Onyx released the first track of their upcoming album CUZO on YouTube. Despite announcing that the CUZO album would be released on September 5, 2013, it was never released. In August 2012, Onyx released their second compilation album, titled Cold Case Files Vol. 2.

On March 18, 2014, Onyx released their first album in over a decade, called Wakedafucup. Released through Goon MuSick, the album is entirely produced by Snowgoons. The album features guest appearances from Sean Price, Papoose, Cormega, Reks, Snak the Ripper, and ASAP Ferg. WakeDaFucUp was named by XXL as one of the best hip-hop albums of 2014. In 2014, X-Ray Records, a division of Cleopatra Records, released a compilation of Onyx's unreleased songs called #TURNDAFUCUP. The collection mainly contained songs from the unreleased album CUZO, in addition to modern trap style remixes of several of their older songs. It featured guest appearances by Busta Rhymes, Raekwon, Myster DL, Ras Kass, and Ill Bill.

In 2015, Onyx released Against All Authorities, a six-track EP protesting police brutality in the United States. The EP was produced by Canadian producer Scopic and features appearances by Sick Flo, Ras Kass, Jasia'n, and Canadian rapper Merkules. Later that year, Def Jam released an eleven-track compilation of Onyx's classic songs called ICON. On November 22, 2015, Snowgoons attempted to raise funds on Kickstarter for a new project called Onyx vs. M.O.P., planned to be a new collaboration album that would have been released in spring of the next year. Because the project only received $10,000 out of its $30,000 goal, it was canceled on December 18, 2015. In 2017, Onyx collaborated with the Dutch hardcore hip hop group Dope D.O.D. to release the collaboration album Shotgunz in Hell. The album features appearances by Sick Flo, Snak the Ripper, Dopey Rotten, and DJ Nelson.

In 2018, Onyx released Black Rock, which was produced by Onyx and Slovenian producer Kid AC.

On May 31, 2019, the album "100 Mad" was released, the title referring to Onyx's artist collective. Production on the album included Snowgoons and The Alchemist, and guest vocalists included Conway the Machine, Tha God Fahim, Jay Nice, Planet Asia, Termanology and more.

In July 2019, Onyx announced the release of a new compilation of unreleased songs called Lost Treasures. The cover for this compilation was drawn by a designer from Russia. The compilation was released through X-Ray Records on February 7, 2020.

On November 15, 2019, the group released the eighth studio album SnowMads, entirely produced by Snowgoons. Among the guests on the album were rappers Bumpy Knuckles aka Freddy Foxxx, Flee Lord, Nems, SickFlo, Knuckles of NBS and Ufo Fev. The album was chosen as "The best rap album of 2019" by the Russian website Rap.Ru, as well as "one of the best rap albums of 2019" by the editors of the Russian website HipHop4Real. The album was featured on a Russian late-night talk show Evening Urgant hosted by Ivan Urgant on Channel One, where Onyx performed their most famous hit "Slam", as well as on the Bulgarian show Шоуто на Николаос Цитиридис on bTV, where members of the group gave an interview and performed the song "Kill Da Mic".

In 2020, Lords of the Underground released a video for the song "Whats Up", recorded with Onyx, later was released a single for this song.

On April 9, 2021, the group released their ninth studio album Onyx 4 Life. The album features rappers Mad Lion, Cappadonna, Panama P.I., Planet Asia, SickFlo and Snak the Ripper. Music for the album was produced by Chilean beatmakers Crack Brodas (DJ Audas and El Bruto CHR). Onyx released a two visuals for "Coming Outside" and "Ahh Yeah". The cover for the new album was painted by the Russian tattoo artist Alexey Mashkow.

On March 4, 2022, Onyx released their tenth studio album 1993 via 100 Mad. The release consists of 13 tracks. The music for the album was produced by Ukrainian beatmaker Stasevich. The beats sounds like it was made in 1993 with hard drums and dark samples. According to the group, the album was recorded in 24 hours in one studio session: “We didn't write any lyrics on this album, this is a vibe”. In support of the release, Onyx released three visuals for the songs "Bo! Bo! Bo!", "Ruff & Rugged" and "Just Slam".

On May 6, 2022, Onyx released the compilation #Turndafucup (The Original Sessions) via X-Ray Records. A reissue of the 2014 compilation, it features the 6 tracks in their original form before they were reworked and remixed. It also includes two bonus tracks that were recorded during the same session but have never been released on an album before.

On May 13, 2022, Onyx released their eleventh studio album Onyx Versus Everybody via Surface Noise Records. The release consists of 10 tracks. The album features rappers Termanology, Harrd Luck, Ricky Bats, and Big Twin. The music for the album was produced by one of the group members, Fredro Starr. On June 15, Onyx released the visuals for "Shoot Wit".

On May 14, 2022, Onyx competed in a music rap battle against Cypress Hill at Fight Night Music at The Kia Forum in Inglewood, California. Cypress Hill ran through their classics "When The Shit Goes Down", "Hand On The Pump", "How Could I Just Kill A Man", "Insane In The Brain", and more, while Onyx countered with their noteworthy hits including "Throw Ya Gunz", "Last Dayz", "Shut 'Em Down", and "Slam" among others.

On September 9, 2022, Onyx released their twelfth studio album World Take Over via 100 Mad. The release consists of 12 tracks and features rappers from all over the world. On October 6, 2023, a deluxe version of the album was released, including six versions of the single "What We Doing'?", recorded with artists from Australia, Italy, Colombia, Germany and Norway. On July 17, Onyx released the visuals for "What We Doing'?".

On May 5, 2023, Onyx released their thirteenth studio album Blood On Da X via 100 Mad. The release consists of 13 tracks. It features rapper EnWhy on the track "Get the Fuc Outta Here". The album's music was produced by Dom Dirtee, Pauly Cicero, Alcapella, Fredro Starr, Lord Nez, Sticky Fingaz & Quab. On March 23, Onyx released the visuals for "The Boom Boom Bap".

On July 21, 2023, German label Goon MuSick released Bacdafucup Remixed, a compilation of remixes of tracks from the debut album. The music for the album was produced by German beatmaking team Snowgoons, except for two tracks, which were remixed by German producers BoFaatBeatz ("Atak Of Da Bal-Hedz") and Jn'Ration ("Da Nex Niguz").

On March 15, 2024, Onyx released a new single "The Money Kids". On July 9, a music video was released in which director Luca De Massis transformed Onyx into computer-generated puppets and sent them traveling around New York City.

On June 14, 2024, X-Ray Records of Cleopatra Records Inc. released Ghetto Anthems, a compilation of re-recorded Onyx hits, some of which were recorded back in 2013. The release was supplemented by a new single "WTF U Talkin' About". The music for all tracks was produced by Frenchman Eric Debris of Métal Urbain and German producer Jürgen Engler of Die Krupps. Both producers work out of X-Ray Records's studio, located in Austin.

On March 3, 2025, Onyx released the first single "Black Skinheads" from their upcoming album Lower East Side. On March 27, the second single "Tear Shit Up" was released. On March 31, Onyx released a joint track with the French rap group L’uZine — "Paris Is Burning" from the upcoming joint album Battle Royale, the release of which is scheduled for April 29. On April 11, X-Ray Records will release Onyx's fourteenth album Lower East Side on CD and vinyl, produced entirely by Queens-born beatmaker Lord Nez. The release consists of 13 tracks and was recorded at Overtones Recording Studio in North Hollywood, Los Angeles.

== Members ==
=== Current members ===
- Fredro Starr (1988–present)
- Sticky Fingaz (1991–present)

=== Former members ===
- Big DS (1988–1994) (died 2003)
- Sonny Seeza (1988–2009)

== Video games ==
- Rap Jam: Volume One (1995)
- Law & Order: Criminal Intent (2005)

== Discography ==
Studio albums

- Bacdafucup (1993)
- All We Got Iz Us (1995)
- Shut 'Em Down (1998)
- Bacdafucup: Part II (2002)
- Triggernometry (2003)
- Wakedafucup (2014)
- Black Rock (2018)
- Snowmads (2019)
- Onyx 4 Life (2021)
- 1993 (2022)
- Onyx Versus Everybody (2022)
- Blood On Da X (2023)
- World Take Over (2023)
- Lower East Side (2025)
- It All Started in Brooklyn (2026)

Collaborative albums

- Shotgunz in Hell (with Dope D.O.D.) (2017)
- Battle Royale (with L’uZine) (2025)

== Awards and nominations ==
In 1994, for the album Bacdafucup, Onyx was nominated for "Favorite New Rap/Hip-Hop Artist" at the American Music Awards and won "Best Rap Album" at the Soul Train Music Awards. Onyx was also nominated five times at The Source Hip Hop Music Awards ceremony in 1994.

Year	Award	Nominated work	Category	Result
1994	American Music Awards of 1994	Bacdafucup	Rap/Hip-Hop New Artist	Nominated
1994	1994 Soul Train Music Awards	Bacdafucup	Best Rap Album	Won
1994	The Source Hip Hop Music Awards	Onyx	New group of the year	Nominated
1994	The Source Hip Hop Music Awards	Onyx	New artist of the year	Nominated
1994	The Source Hip Hop Music Awards	Onyx	Live performer of the year	Nominated
1994	The Source Hip Hop Music Awards	"Slam"	Single of the year	Nominated
1994	The Source Hip Hop Music Awards	Bacdafucup	Album of the year	Nominated

At the end of 1993, the US magazines Billboard and Cashbox placed Onyx on several of their final annual charts. In 1996, CMJ New Music Monthly placed the album All We Got Iz Us in their list The 25 Best Hip-Hop Albums of 1995. In 2014, #WakeDaFucUp was named as one of the best hip-hop albums of 2014 by XXL. In 2020, SnowMads was chosen as "The Best Rap Album of 2019: Readers' Choice" by the Russian website Rap.Ru.

Year	Work	Publication	Country	Accolade	Rank
1993	Onyx	Billboard	United States	Hot Rap Artists	1
1993	Onyx	Billboard	United States	Top Billboard 200 Album Artists	64
1993	Onyx	Billboard	United States	Top R&B Album Artists	20
1993	Onyx	Billboard	United States	Hot 100 Singles Artists	45
1993	Onyx	Cashbox	United States	Top New Groups	4
1996	All We Got Iz Us	CMJ New Music Monthly	United States	The 25 Best Hip-Hop Albums of 1995	17
2014	#WakeDaFucUp	XXL	United States	The 25 Best Hip-Hop Albums of 2014	–
2020	SnowMads	Rap.Ru	Russia	The Best Rap Album of 2019: Readers' Choice	1
