= Triggernometry (album) =

Studio album by Onyx
- Released: July 22, 2003 (EU); August 12, 2003 (US)
- Recorded: 2002–2003
- Studio: OPM Studios (Los Angeles, California)
- Genre: East Coast hip-hop; hardcore hip-hop; gangsta rap
- Length: 48:18
- Label: D3
- Producer: Fredro Starr (exec.); Sticky Fingaz (exec.); Omar "Iceman" Sharif (exec.); Kronic Tones; Dominche (co-prod.); Hector Delgado (co-prod.)

Onyx chronology
Bacdafucup: Part II (2002)	Triggernometry (2003)	Cold Case Files: Vol. 1 (2008)

Singles from Triggernometry
- 1. "Mama Cryin'/Wild N Here" Released: 2003

Triggernometry is the fifth studio album from hardcore rap group Onyx, released on July 22, 2003, by D3 Entertainment. The whole album was produced by Kronic Tones. The album features appearances by American rappers T Hussle, Genovese, Begetz, X1, Bad Luck, and Dirty Getinz. The album peaked at No. 66 on the Top R&B/Hip-Hop Albums music chart.

== Background ==
Triggernometry is an album consisting of 10 new tracks and 11 stories from the life of the group Onyx, told by the group members themselves in the gap between the songs. All the songs were produced by one producer Kronic Tones, who had already produced 7 tracks for Fredro Starr's second solo album Don't Get Mad Get Money. The album was criticized by the fans of the group Onyx, who believe that such production is suitable only for nightclubs, but not for the streets. Originally, the album was due out on October 31 under the title Triggernometry: The Study of Guns, but later the name was shortened to Triggernometry, and the album was released earlier.

== Singles ==
The one and only single, "Mama Cryin'/Wild N Here" featuring X1, Begetz, Dirty Getinz, Bad Luck was released in 2003.

== Critical response ==
Professional ratings
Review scores
Source	Rating
Rate Your Music	2.09/5 stars
AllMusic	1.5/5 stars

In 2003, the editor of the Russian online newspaper NewsLab.ru, Mitya Meshalkin, praised the album, adding that Triggernometry, despite the frightening (a mixture of the words "trigger" and "trigonometry") name, had noticeably less street negligence and noticeably more "musicality".

In 2003, RapReviews.com editor Steve "Flash" Juon gave the album a 4 out of 10, calling it "pathetic attempt to relive past Onyx glories". The author also noted that Sticky exhibits the same problem he did on "Decade," namely that he sounds tired and unenthused, like he's going through the motions. Sticky and Fredro seem equally uninterested in resurrecting the name Onyx and shouldn't have even tried.

== Track listing ==
#	track	featured guest(s)	producer(s)	length
01.	"Trigonometry Intro"			0:58
02.	"Gun Clap Music"		Kronic Tones	4:08
03.	"Stick Up"			0:27
04.	"JMJ"		Kronic Tones	4:10
05.	"Def Scams"			0:39
06.	"Street Is Us"	T Hussle	Kronic Tones	2:52
07.	"Source Awards"			1:04
08.	"Wild N Here"		Kronic Tones	3:58
09.	"'93 Flex"			0:39
10.	"O.N.Y.X. RMX"	Genovese	Kronic Tones; Dominche (co-producer)	3:54
11.	"Wu Da Competition"			1:06
12.	"Over"	Begetz	Kronic Tones; Hector Delgado (co-producer)	4:13
13.	"B.I.G."			1:17
14.	"Look Dog"	X1	Kronic Tones	3:16
15.	"Irv Da A&R"			0:53
16.	"Da Next, Pt. 2"		Kronic Tones	3:42
17.	"Rappers in Flicks"			0:31
18.	"Champions"	X1	Kronic Tones	3:23
19.	"Holla Back 50"			2:30
20.	"Mama Cryin"	X1; Begetz; Dirty Getinz & Bad Luck	Kronic Tones	4:01
21.	"Trigonometry (Outro)"			0:37

== Samples ==
Gun Clap Music

- "Calypso Rock" by Original Tropicana Steel Band

O.N.Y.X. (Unreleased Original Version)

- "You're a Big Girl Now" by The Stylistics (1970)

== Personnel ==
Credits for Triggernometry adapted from AllMusic and CD booklet.

- Onyx — performer, vocals
- Fredro Starr — performer, vocals, executive producer
- Sticky Fingaz — performer, vocals, executive producer
- Sonny Seeza — performer, vocals
- Omar "Iceman" Sharif — executive producer
- T Hussle — guest artist
- Genovese — guest artist
- Begetz — guest artist
- X1 — guest artist
- Bad Luck — guest artist
- Dirty Getinz — guest artist
- Kronic Tones — producer
- Dominche — co-producer
- Hector Delgado — recording, mixing, co-producer
- Brian Porizek — artwork, design
- Aldy Damian — label direction

== Charts ==
Chart (2003)	Peak position
US Top R&B/Hip-Hop Albums	66
