= Strapped =

1993 television crime drama film directed by Forest Whitaker

- Genre: Crime drama
- Written by: Dena Kleiman
- Directed by: Forest Whitaker
- Theme music composer: Joe Romano
- Country of origin: United States
- Original language: English

Production
- Executive producer: Colin Callender
- Producer: Nellie Nugiel
- Cinematography: Larry Banks
- Editor: Glenn Morgan
- Running time: 104 minutes
- Production companies: HBO Showcase; Osiris Films

Original release
- Network: HBO
- Release: August 21, 1993

Strapped is a 1993 American television crime drama film produced by HBO Showcase. The film was directed by Forest Whitaker and is the cinematic debut of Bokeem Woodbine. It features several rappers including Fredro Starr, Sticky Fingaz, Monie Love, Busta Rhymes, Yo-Yo and Kool Moe Dee.

== Plot ==
Diquan Mitchell is a 19-year old ex-con who is attempting to turn his life around and start legitimate work. Upon arriving home, Mitchell witnesses an argument between two youths, Chucky and Pharaoh, turn into a shooting in the stairwell of his apartment building. Deciding not to expose the youth who did the shooting to law enforcement, Mitchell takes the handgun used in the killing from him and tells him to run. Mitchell lives in a Brooklyn public housing project apartment with his mother, grandmother, and two sisters, and has a girlfriend named Latisha Jordan, who is 8 months pregnant.

Mitchell's girlfriend, also a convicted felon, gets caught selling crack cocaine to an undercover New York City police officer. After a hearing, a judge sets bail at $2,500 for Jordan. Due to not having the funds to bail her out, Mitchell join forces with the police in a complicated undercover operation that involves selling guns on the street while selling information to the police. In addition to becoming an informant, Mitchell is also promised a deal by the cops that the lengthy imprisonment (of either 18 months or 8 years) and the case for Jordan would be dismissed if they successfully take down a gun salesman named Ben, who has been selling guns to neighborhood youths.

Mitchell teams up with his long-time friend, Bamboo, to help out with the case while pocketing cash from gun sales on the side. Shortly after bailing his girlfriend out of jail, Mitchell and Bamboo speak with Ann, who puts them in contact with her brother in Georgia to buy guns to make their own profits. The cops later stake out the location where Ben set up to make sales, having arrested him earlier for possession of 150 firearms at his suburban-area home.

The cops are later informed by the ATF that they can't charge him due to a lack of evidence that he is selling the weapons to youths. They later tell Mitchell that they need more evidence on Ben. After his run-in with the cops, Ben returns to the neighborhood to locate Bamboo and runs into other youths who give him Bamboo's beeper number in return for multiple firearms.

Ben then reaches Bamboo on the phone and tells him that he is aware that Bamboo has been speaking with the cops about his gun selling business and threatens his life. Thereafter, Mitchell and Bamboo visit a local convenience store where Bamboo gets into an argument with a Korean cashier over the size of a sandwich. Bamboo then accidentally shoots a little girl who is right behind him. After being interrogated by the cops for the shooting, Mitchell and Bamboo are released from jail. Upon returning to the neighborhood, Mitchell is told by Lay-Lay that everybody has been saying he has been working with the cops.

After learning about Mitchell worked as a police informant, Bamboo later shows up at Mitchell's apartment to confront him about the news, which leads to a fight and shootout between the two. Bamboo escapes from police and is never seen again afterwards.

The film ends with Mitchell accepting responsibility for the youth killed at the beginning of the film, having used the gun during the shootout. In return for his guilty plea, the case against his girlfriend is dismissed. In court, Mitchell is sentenced to prison.

== Cast ==
- Bokeem Woodbine as Diquan Mitchell
- Kia Joy Goodwin as Latisha Jordan
- Fredro Starr (credited as Fredro) as Mark "Bamboo" Rivers
- Michael Biehn as Matthew McRae
- Craig Wasson as Ben DiLorenzo
- Jermaine Hopkins as Lay-Lay
- Paul McCrane as Mitch Corman
- Samuel E. Wright as Dave
- Willie James Stiggers, Jr. as Chucky
- Chi-Ali as Pharaoh Dodson
- Starletta DuPois as Mrs. Mitchell
- Monie Love as Yvonne Mitchell
- Isaiah Washington as Willie
- Yo-Yo as Ann
- Yul Vazquez as Latisha's attorney
- Busta Rhymes as Buster
- Dorothi Fox as Grandmother
- Kool Moe Dee as Chaz

== See also ==
- List of hood films
