= SomeKindaWonderful =

American rock band

- Origin: Cleveland, Ohio, U.S.
- Genres: Alternative rock, neo soul
- Years active: 2013–present
- Labels: Downtown; Vertigo/Capitol (non-USA)
- Members: Jordy Towers; Ben Schigel; Sarah Dryer; Justin Andres
- Past members: Matthew Gibson
- Website: somekindawonderful.com

SomeKindaWonderful is an American rock band from Cleveland, Ohio, consisting of Jordy Towers on vocals, Sw1tched singer Ben Schigel on drums, Justin Andres on bass and keys and Sarah Dryer on percussion and vocals. Towers, a singer-songwriter formerly signed to Interscope Records, formed the band in January 2013 during a visit to Olmsted Falls, Ohio after meeting and befriending local musicians Matthew Gibson and Schigel at a bar, eventually heading to a studio and recording the song "Reverse".

The band later signed to Downtown Records and released their self-titled debut studio album on June 16, 2014. "Reverse" (written the night they met in a bar just outside of Cleveland Ohio) was released as their debut single and garnered initial support from Los Angeles modern rock station KROQ, eventually peaking at number 1 on the Billboard Alternative Songs chart. The band went on a US tour supporting New Politics and Bad Suns in Fall 2014. Spring 2015 they did a US Headlining tour, "Burn It Up Tour," supported by Marc Scibilia. Following all of this, each of the members, except Jordy Towers (Lead Singer), decided to retire from the touring life to start families.

In 2016, Towers decided to start creating new SomeKindaWonderful music. SKW was his brain child and did not want to give it up since the success of "Reverse" kept fans wondering where SKW had gone. In July of the same year, Towers connected with German producer Nikolai Potthoff and started creating a new sound for SKW. Towers says, "I think Nikolai and I have captured the natural progression of where SKW should be. As we all know the musical landscape changes so rapidly and I think we've created some timeless records here and have changed with the times nicely".

The EP is forthcoming. The lead single, released in July 2017, is titled "Wheels Up" and featured rapper Casey Veggies. Towers says, "the track is a bass heavy alt soul song we wrote in 10 minutes one night on sleep deprivation and weed."

Towers came into music as a rapper. Touring with Lupe Fiasco as his opening act on "The Cool" tour in 2008 when Towers went by the name "Optimus."

== Discography ==
=== Studio albums ===
List of studio albums, with selected chart positions
Title	Album details	Peak chart positions
Title	Album details	US Heat
SomeKindaWonderful	Released: June 16, 2014 (US); Label: Downtown; Formats: CD, LP, digital download	31

=== Singles ===
List of singles, with selected chart positions, showing year released and album name
Title	Year	Peak chart positions			Album
Title	Year	US Alt.	US Rock Air.	GER	Album
"Reverse"	2013	18	30	30	SomeKindaWonderful
"California Love"	2014	—	—	—	Non-album single
"Wait For Me"	2015	—	—	—	Non-album single (US)
"—" denotes a recording that did not chart or was not released in that territory.
