= Wakedafucup =

WakeDaFucUp

Studio album by Onyx
- Released: March 18, 2014
- Recorded: 2011–2013
- Studio: Major Independents Studio
- Genres: East Coast hip-hop; hardcore hip-hop
- Length: 45:32
- Label: Goon MuSick
- Producers: DJ Illegal (exec.); Fredro Starr (exec.); Snowgoons; J.S. Kuster; Sicknature; Det Gunner

Onyx chronology
Cold Case Files: Vol. 2 (2012)	WakeDaFucUp (2014)	Against All Authorities (2015)

Singles from WakeDaFucUp
- 1. "WakeDaFucUp" Released: February 11, 2014; 2. "We Don't Fucking Care" Released: February 21, 2014; 3. "The Tunnel" Released: March 6, 2014; 4. "Whut Whut" Released: March 13, 2014

#WakeDaFucUp is the sixth studio album by American hip hop group Onyx, released on March 18, 2014 by Goon MuSick. The album is entirely produced by Snowgoons. The album features guest appearances from Sean Price, Makem Pay, Papoose, Cormega, Dope D.O.D., Reks, Snak the Ripper and ASAP Ferg.

#WakeDaFucUp was named by XXL as one of the best hip-hop albums of 2014 in "THE 25 BEST HIP-HOP ALBUMS OF 2014", described by UndergroundHipHop.com as the best-selling CD album of 2014 in "Top 100 Hip Hop Albums For 2014 - CDs" and recognized by Hip-Hop Chamber as the best album of 2014 in "Best Album of 2014", beating Wu-Tang Clan's album A Better Tomorrow.

== Background ==
In 2011, Fredro Starr was on tour as a member of his group Onyx; he connected backstage with DJ Illegal who performed with his group Snowgoons and M.O.P. at the club in Munich, Germany. At that time, Snowgoons were working on a new album called Snowgoons Dynasty and they asked Fredro to be on their album, so DJ Illegal sent Fredro a beat for the song "The Legacy", which Fredro immediately liked and asked Snowgoons to send him some more beats. After listening to some new music, Fredro offered the producers: "Let's just do an album".

On November 6, 2013, in an interview with XXL, it was announced that production on #WakeDaFucUp, which would be entirely produced by German hip-hop production group Snowgoons, would begin. The album title, #WakeDaFucUp, has become widespread by Onyx fans on social networks due to the usage of the hashtag.

== Sonny Seeza ==
To the disappointment of many Onyx fans, the third member of the group, Sonny Seeza, does not appear on the album. Fredro explained this situation in an interview with HipHopDX:

"...Sonsee is not on this album. Sonsee don't rock with us no more, but we never broke up. I still speak to Sonsee, and it ain't no beef. He just don't rock with us, and we can't wait for nobody. If Sonsee ain't gonna rock with us, we gotta go get a nigga like Papoose to do a verse. Somebody like Snak the Ripper will fill in that third spot, and that's the reason why we did some features."

Fredro comments on the situation with Sonsee in an interview on "White Label Radio":

"...Sonsee wasn't on the album cause we recorded it in LA, and we're ain't over Internet shit... So we just did it without him and we just got a couple of features to filling the third verse we needed."

In an interview with Arena, Fredro says that Sonny Seeza himself decided to leave the group:

"...Sonsee is family, forever. But when the train takes off, if you're not on the train... you've got to keep the brand moving. We've got one of the best logos in hip-hop, millions of fans out there, and Sonsee doesn't want to get with us in the studio, then he's got to do what he's got to do."

== Conception of album title ==
"#WakeDaFucUp" is Onyx's first album in the last 10 years. For these 10 years, hip hop changed. This album with its sound should bring back hip hop fans to the original New York sound of the 90's. "Wake the fuck up!" is the call of the group in regards to how Onyx feel about Hip Hop. Fredro Starr explains what happened to hip-hop over the past 10 years:

"...When Nas said, 'Hip Hop is Dead', it wasn't dead. I just think the sound has changed over the last 10 years, so it's hard for any New York rapper with a New York sound to be progressive, do what they want to do successfully and make money. That's why you had every New York rapper trying to rhyme on Down South beats. To this day, you got [New York] rappers trying to rhyme on trap beats, because they want a deal to pay their bills. That's what sells. So you lose the integrity of New York Hip Hop. I just think the fashion in Hip Hop and the way it's being portrayed is definitely colorful. We're about to bring it back to the dark side. That's the Hip Hop we know about-that street shit."

Sticky briefly explains: "Nas said hip-hop is dead, hip-hop is not dead, it's just been sleeping, and it's time for hip-hop to wake the fuck up".

== World Tour ==
In February 2014, in support of a new album, Fredro and Sticky went on a world tour and visited 30 countries. Also were printed exclusive t-shirts and hoodies with album logo "WakeDaFucUp".

== Singles ==
The first single "Wakedafucup" featuring Dope D.O.D. was released on February 11, 2014. Rose Lilah of HotNewHipHop gave the single an HOTTTTT rating, while users gave the single a VERY HOTTTTT rating, saying "2014 is the year of Onyx's return".

The second single "We Don't Fucking Care" featuring A$AP Ferg & Sean Price was released on February 21, 2014. Philip Cheek of HotNewHipHop gave the single a VERY HOTTTTT rating, saying "It sounds great, and A$AP Ferg especially delivers with a verse showcasing a talent we wish we saw more of on Trap Lord". In a February 2014, interview with HipHopDX, Onyx spoke about collaborating with A$AP Ferg on "We Don't Fuckin Care":

"...It's crazy how we connected with him. His DJ is my man, Hectic. And Hectic has been down with Onyx since I did my Firestarr album. I did my album in his bathroom, and we was rockin'. He rocks with them, and said that A$AP Ferg was doing a mixtape called Trap Lord. He wanted us to jump on the mixtape, and then the mixtape turned out to be an album. So in return—just out of respect—it was like, "Hey we'll jump on a joint, and then you can jump on ["We Don't Fucking Care"] on our album." So it was just a mutual respect."

The third single "The Tunnel" featuring Cormega & Papoose was released on March 6, 2014. Onyx pay homage to the venerable venue. In the 90's, NYC's club "The Tunnel" was a premier destination for listening to Hip-Hop.

The fourth single "Whut Whut" was released on March 13, 2014. Onyx slams the alley-oop down with angry rapping about disfiguring your face and what will follow if you don't recognize. The brooding new song finds Sticky Fingaz and Fredro Starr trading aggro bars over ominous keys and stormy atmosphere.

Instrumental for the song "TurnDaFucUp" was later released on the album Snowgoons "Goonstrumentals Vol. 1" (July 11, 2014)

== Videos ==
Snowgoons's DJ Sixkay made visual videos for all tracks from this album. Also Onyx released 11 official music videos from this album: "#WakeDaFucUp", "Whut Whut", "Hammers On Deck (Scarface version)", "Buc Bac", "TurnDaFucUp", "TurnDaFucUp (On Shade 45 With DJ Kay Slay)", "The Realest", "#WakeDaFucUp Reloaded", "Boom!!", "Hammers On Deck (Myster DL version)" and "Hustlin' Hours".

== Critical response ==
Professional ratings
Review scores
Source	Rating
HipHopDX	3.5/5 stars
RapReviews	8/10
XXL	4/5 (XL)

#WakeDaFucUp was met with generally positive reviews from music critics. Homer Johnsen of HipHopDX gave the album three and a half stars out of five, saying "Overall Wakedafucup is multi-faceted. It has street records ("Whut Whut"), Horrorcore verses and inclinations ("Wakedafucup"), first person narratives ("Hustlin Hour"), storytelling ("Trust No Bitch") and conscious Rap ("One 4 Da Team"). There is a lot going on, but it's stays digestible as a whole, and never loses sight of itself. It's also a welcome album during a time in which comparable street records are few and far between. Veterans like U-God of the Wu-Tang Clan and Diddy have said Hip Hop is getting too soft, so to see Onyx drop a record that's truer to its roots than most similar Rap music these days is both welcome and refreshing."

Kellan Miller of XXL gave the album an XL rating, saying "With Wakedafucup, Onyx have followed in the footsteps of what made the recent studio releases of their New York contemporaries Nas and Jay successful: having fun. It just so happens that Onyx's brand of fun has nothing to do with popping Molly or even rocking Tom Ford, but rather rocking the eardrums with psychotic intensity. Saving the best for last, the album concludes with "Turndafucup," a record that could just as easily been dubbed "Slam Part 2" because it is just that good. If you've been sleeping on Onyx the last decade or so, it's clearly time to wakedafucup."

Grant Jones of RapReviews gave the album an eight out of ten, saying "This is brutal listening, yet never boring and that is testament to both Onyx's energetic displays and Snowgoons willingness to provide understated production where necessary, rather than simply providing bangers on every song. Given how well this has been received by the fans, it's likely a sequel may be in order, but the only way this could be outdone is by gathering Onyx and M.O.P. together for a collaborative project - produced exclusively by Snowgoons. Now that really would make people wake the fuck up!"

== Awards ==
- #WakeDaFucUp was named by XXL as one of the best hip-hop albums of 2014 in "THE 25 BEST HIP-HOP ALBUMS OF 2014" (June 30, 2014).
- #WakeDaFucUp was described by UndergroundHipHop.com as the best-selling CD album of 2014 in "Top 100 Hip Hop Albums For 2014 - CDs" (December 11, 2014).
- #WakeDaFucUp was recognized by Hip-Hop Chamber as the best album of 2014 in "Best Album of 2014", beating Wu-Tang Clan's album A Better Tomorrow.

== #WakeDaFucUp Reloaded ==
Two years later, on April 18, 2016, Onyx re-released the album #WakeDaFucUp with the new name #WakeDaFucUp Reloaded with 4 new remixes and new featuring guests. The following tracks were added: "WakeDaFucUp (Reloaded Remix)" (feat. Dope D.O.D.), "The Tunnel (Big Kap Tribute Remix)" (feat. Ali Vegas, Nature, Steele & Sadat X), "Dirty Cops (Reloaded Remix)" (feat. Chris Rivers), "TurnDaFucUp (100 Mad Remix)" (feat. Sick Flo, Sicknature & Snak the Ripper). The release was accompanied by the premiere of a new video for the track "Boom !!" and "#WakeDaFucUp Reloaded". Also the delivery package included a free bonus disk Onyx "Against All Authorities" and an exclusive poster

A year later, on April 18, 2017, #WakeDaFucUp Reloaded was released on vinyl with a limited edition of 300 copies. The vinyl included 11 songs. The release was accompanied by the premiere of a new video for the track "Hustlin Hours"

== #WakeDaFucUp Part 2 ==
In December 2017, during a telephone interview for "Menu Melody Podcast", Fredro Starr said that Onyx has plans to record with Snowgoons album #WakeDaFucUp (Part 2).

== Track listing (#WakeDaFucUp) ==
#	track	featured guest(s)	scratches	length
01.	"WakeDaFucUp Intro"			0:42
02.	"Whut Whut"			2:50
03.	"We Don't Fuckin Care"	A$AP Ferg; Sean Price		4:45
04.	"Hustlin Hours"	Makem Pay	DJ Danetic	3:26
05.	"Buc Bac"			3:06
06.	"WakeDaFucUp"	Dope D.O.D.		4:49
07.	"The Tunnel"	Cormega; Papoose	DJ Danetic	4:19
08.	"The Realest"			2:51
09.	"Dirty Cops"	Snak the Ripper		3:47
10.	"Boom!!"		DJ Illegal	2:41
11.	"Trust No Bitch"			3:02
12.	"One 4 Da Team"	Reks		3:47
13.	"Hammers On Deck"			2:31
14.	"TurnDaFucUp"		DJ Crypt	2:56

== Track listing (#WakeDaFucUp Reloaded - CD) ==
#	track	featured guest(s)	scratches	length
15.	"WakeDaFucUp (Reloaded Remix)"	Dope D.O.D.		4:51
16.	"The Tunnel (Big Kap Tribute Remix)"	Ali Vegas; Nature; Steele; Sadat X	DJ Danetic	4:01
17.	"Dirty Cops (Reloaded Remix)"	Chris Rivers		3:49
18.	"TurnDaFucUp (100 Mad Remix)"	Sick Flo; Sicknature; Snak the Ripper		4:12

== Track listing (#WakeDaFucUp Reloaded - Vinyl) ==
#	track	featured guest(s)	scratches	length
01.	"WakeDaFucUp"	Dope D.O.D.		4:49
02.	"We Don't Fuckin Care"	A$AP Ferg; Sean Price		4:45
03.	"The Realest"			2:51
04.	"Buc Bac"			3:06
05.	"The Tunnel (Reloaded)"	Ali Vegas; Nature; Steele; Sadat X	DJ Danetic	4:01
06.	"Hustlin Hours"	Makem Pay	DJ Danetic	3:26
07.	"Dirty Cops (Reloaded Remix)"	Chris Rivers		3:49
08.	"Boom!!"		DJ Illegal	2:41
09.	"Whut Whut"			2:50
10.	"Hammers On Deck"			2:31
11.	"TurnDaFucUp (Reloaded)"	Sick Flo; Sicknature; Snak the Ripper		4:12
