= Snak the Ripper =

Canadian rapper

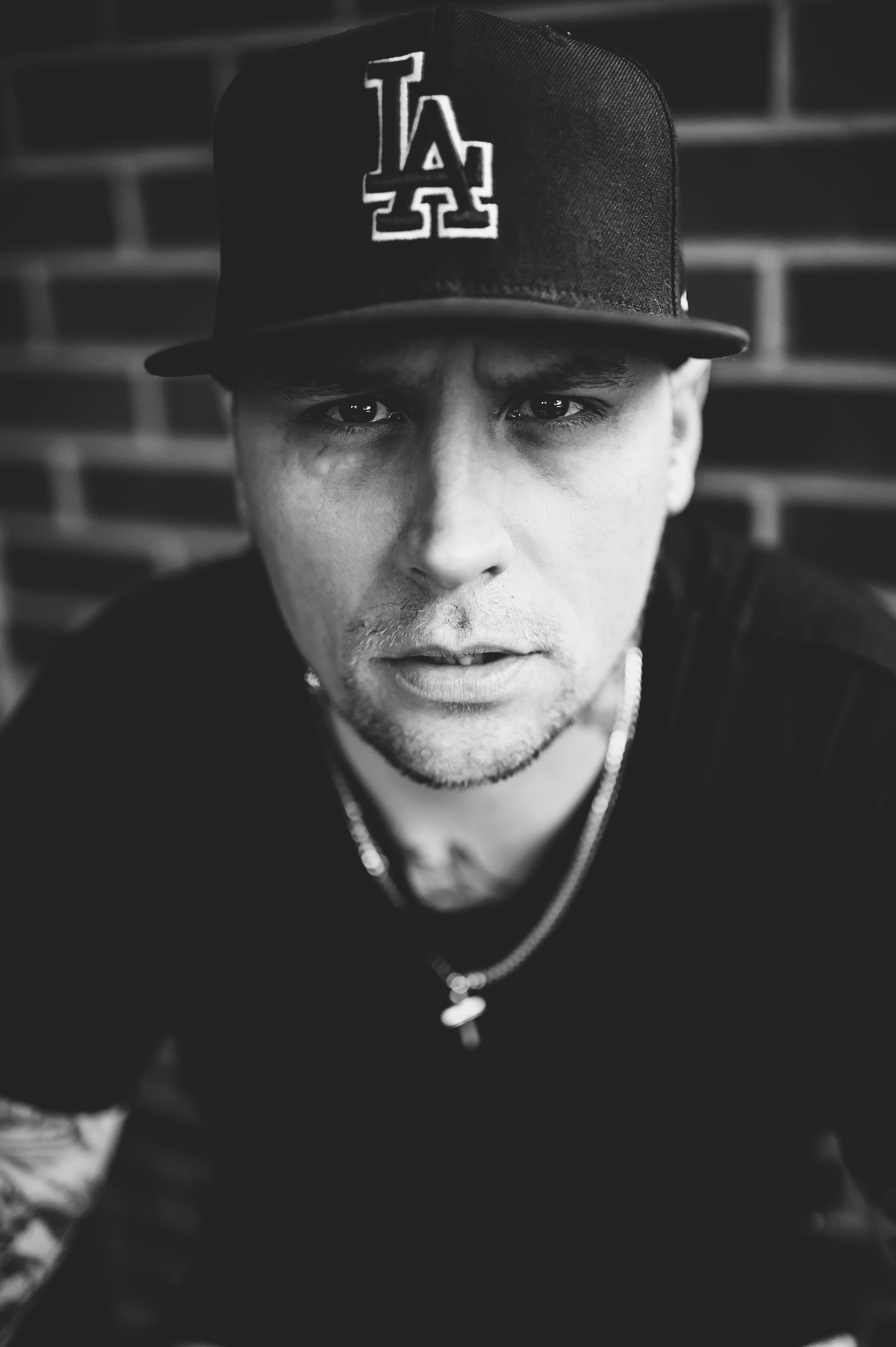
- Snak the Ripper in 2017

Background information
- Born: William Scott Fyvie; November 16, 1982 (age 43); Maple Ridge, British Columbia, Canada
- Origin: Vancouver, British Columbia, Canada
- Genre: Hip-hop
- Occupation: Rapper
- Years active: 2006–present
- Labels: Stealth Bomb, Camobear Records (former)
- Website: snaktheripper.com

William Scott Fyvie (born November 16, 1982), better known by his stage name Snak the Ripper, is a Canadian rapper from British Columbia.

He was a founding member of Stompdown Killaz (SDK), a hip hop collective and graffiti crew. In 2010, he became a member of 100 MAD, a hip hop collective founded by Fredro Starr and Sticky Fingaz of New York City rap group Onyx.

== Early life ==
Snak was born in 1982 in Maple Ridge, British Columbia and grew up in a suburb of Vancouver. In high school, he was in a small band. He dropped out of high school, began painting and for a while was living as a homeless graffiti artist. In 1998, he was charged with 150 counts of mischief, but due to lack of evidence, the charges were dropped. He began going by the name "Snak" in 2001.

Between 2003 and 2006, Snak moved around between Vancouver, Montreal and Toronto developing his graffiti skills and building notoriety in the Canadian hip-hop scene. He was homeless and struggled with substance abuse, using his love for writing songs as an escape.

== Career ==
Snak began writing music in 2006. In 2007, Snak released his debut album The Ripper. He integrated "the Ripper" into his stage name that year. His album Sex Machine was released on Camobear Records in 2010. In 2011, he released Fear of a Snak Planet which featured several Spanish collaborations. His 2012 album White Dynamite was also released on Camobear Records. In 2012, Snak the Ripper collaborated with dubstep producer Datsik.

In 2014, Snak released the album Just Giver, and subsequently went on tour in Canada.

In October of 2015 following a deleted social media post by Madchild, Snak the Ripper released a series of diss tracks aimed at him known as The Sadchild Trilogy, which included "Assisted Suicide", "Child Abuse" and "Triple Homicide". Madchild responded with the tracks "The Funeral" and "Fatal Attraction".

Snak was nominated for "Hip Hop Recording of the Year" at the Western Canadian Music Awards in 2015 and 2016. His 2016 release From the Dirt debuted at number one on iTunes Hip Hop & Rap Charts. From the Dirt peaked at number 40 on the Canadian Albums Chart. In 2018, his album Off the Rails peaked at 47 on the Canadian Albums Chart. He promoted the album with a European tour.

In 2020, he collaborated with Dax and Classified. In 2021, he released two live albums; Live in Los Angeles 2018 and Pissing Off The Neighbours (Live). In 2022, he released the album Let It Rip.

Snak is the founder and owner of the record label Stealth Bomb Records. It was established in 2013 after he was dissatisfied with his previous label. The label was on hiatus from 2017 through 2020.

== Discography ==
List adapted from Spotify on March 29, 2023:

=== Studio albums ===
- The Ripper (2007)
- Fatt Snak (2008; with Fatt Matt)
- Sex Machine (2009)
- Fear of a Snak Planet (2011)
- White Dynamite (2012)
- Just Giver (2014)
- From the Dirt (2016)
- Off the Rails (2018)
- Let It Rip (2022)
- Kill the Messenger (2025)

=== Live albums ===
- Live in Los Angeles 2018 (2021)
- Pissing Off The Neighbours (Live) (2021)
- Pissing Off The Neighbours 2 (2022)
