= AllHipHop =

Hip hop news website founded in 1998

- Website type: Music website
- Available in: English
- Owner: AHH Holdings LLC
- Creators: Greg Watkins; Chuck Creekmur
- Revenue: US$4 million (as of 2007)
- Website: allhiphop.com
- Commercial: Yes
- Registration: Optional
- Launched: 1998
- Current status: Active

AllHipHop is a hip-hop news website founded by Greg Watkins and Chuck Creekmur in 1998. It publishes music news, interviews, commentary, reviews, and other coverage of hip-hop culture. The website grew out of Watkins's online promotion of artists signed to Oblique Recordings and Creekmur's journalism website Tantrum Online.

== History ==
The website was founded in 1998 by Greg Watkins and Chuck Creekmur. In 1997, Watkins registered the allhiphop.com domain to promote the artists on Oblique Recordings, a small record label he operated. The website provided music downloads to promote the label's artists. After reaching 30,000 downloads a month, Watkins struck deals with eMusic and other retailers to sell downloads.

Creekmur, a freelance journalist, had launched a website, tantrum-online, in New York City. After merging the companies, they adapted Trantrum's exclamation point logo for AllHipHop. By 2004, the business generated enough revenue for Watkins and Creekmur to work full-time on the website. In 2007, the revenue exceeded US$4 million.

On August 12, 2017, AllHipHop announced a partnership with Maven, a company based in Seattle, to manage its entire digital media platform.

Figures from May 2008 show it attracted over 37 million page views a month.

== Accolades ==
In 2006, AllHipHop won the Rising Stars Award from Black Enterprise magazine.

Essence magazine dubbed AllHipHop "the CNN of hip-hop" in 2008.
