= Fredro Starr =

American rapper and actor (born 1971)

- Also known as: Magic; Kool Fredro; Mickey Billy; Never; Firestarr; Dro Starr
- Born: Fred Lee Scruggs Jr. April 18, 1971 (age 55); East Flatbush, New York, U.S.
- Origin: Queens, New York City, U.S.
- Genres: East Coast hip-hop; hardcore hip-hop
- Occupations: Rapper; actor
- Years active: 1988–present
- Labels: JMJ; Def Jam; Mad Money Movement
- Member of: Onyx

Fred Lee Scruggs Jr. (born April 18, 1971), better known by his stage name Fredro Starr, is an American rapper and actor best known as a member of the hardcore rap group Onyx. Fredro Starr was discovered by the late hip hop star Jam Master Jay of Run-DMC who signed Onyx on his label JMJ Records. Onyx went on to release three top selling albums before Fredro began his solo career. As a part of Onyx, Fredro Starr was nominated as "Favorite Rap/Hip-Hop New Artist" on American Music Awards of 1994 and won "Best Rap Album" on 1994 Soul Train Music Awards.

Fredro Starr has starred in more than 55 films and television shows. He made his acting debut in the HBO drama Strapped. His film credits include Spike Lee's Clockers, Sunset Park, Ride, Light It Up, Save the Last Dance and Torque. He also performed the Save the Last Dance's theme song, "Shining Through", with Jill Scott on the multi-platinum soundtrack.

Starr made his television debut in Law & Order and New York Undercover, but he is known for his role of Quentin 'Q' Brooks on UPN's Moesha starring Brandy. He also appeared in HBO's The Wire, NYPD Blue, Blade, and CSI: Miami. Fredro also co-hosted Dance 360, a daily, half-hour urban dance competition show on Paramount Television.

== Early life ==
Fred Lee Scruggs Jr. was born in Kings County Hospital Center on April 18, 1971 in East Flatbush, Brooklyn, New York City. He grew up in Flatbush, Brooklyn. In 1984, at the age of 13, he moved with his brother David Scruggs to South Jamaica, Queens. Between 1984 and 1988, Fredro Starr studied at John Adams High School (Queens). Other students at John Adams High School included Marlon Fletcher (also known as Big DS), Tyrone Taylor (Suave, Sonny Seeza), Mr. Cheeks, and Freaky Tah. Fredro first met Suave at a rap battle in Ajax Park in Jamaica, Queens (now called "Dr. Charles R. Drew Park").

== Music career ==
=== 1984–1988: Career beginnings ===
Fred started out doing breakdancing after watching the movie "Beat Street" (1984), he was known by the name Magic.

In late 1985, Fredro Starr decided to become a street poet after watching the movie "Krush Groove" (1985). He was inspired by the style of LL Cool J.

Starr credits an instance in 1986 on the Baisley Park, Queens, basketball court as the first time he rapped with his friends over live mixes by GrandMasta Vic and CutMasta JT. He has stated that he was joined by Cocheeks (also known as Mr. Cheeks), Freaky Tah, Dot-a-Rock, Spank G and Panama P.I. (also known as Big Prince). In this place were usually held jams, and often there were shoot-outs, but this did not stop anyone. Fredro was then known as Kool Fredro. In an interview with Brian Coleman, Fredro Starr remembers:

The same year, Fred started working at "Nu Tribe Barbershop" on Jamaica Avenue in Queens. His younger cousin Kirk Jones (also known as Sticky Fingaz) joined him as a barber three years later after moving from Brooklyn to Queens. At "Nu Tribe Barbershop" Fred had to cut local drug dealers from Supreme Team (gang), as well as celebrities such as Kool G Rap, Rakim, Big Daddy Kane and others. In this barbershop Fred and Kirk made money until they heard on the radio their song "Throw Ya Gunz" in November 1992.

At the same time Fredro along with his cousin Kirk Jones, then known as Trop, visited the nightclubs of New York. The guys wore green dreadlocks and dressed in Dr. Martens boots. In an interview with Unkut, hip hop artist B-1 described his friendship with Fredro and Sticky:

=== Onyx ===
In 1988, after graduating from school at the age of 17, Fredro Starr created the rap group Onyx along with his schoolmates Big DS and Suavé (also known as Sonny Seeza). Big DS came up with the name for the group, he named it after the black stone Onyx. They began to make the first demos in the basement of B-Wiz with drum machine beats from an SP-12.

In 1989, Onyx signed Jeffrey Harris as their manager, who helped them secure a contract with the label Profile Records. In 1990, at York Studio in Brooklyn, they recorded their first single, "Ah, And We Do It Like This", which was released to low sales on April 25, 1990, on Profile.

Fredro Starr, Big DS and Suave (also known as Sonny Seeza) met Jam Master Jay in a traffic jam at The Jones Beach GreekFest Festival on July 13, 1991. Jay give them about two months to get a demo, but Suave and Big DS they didn't make it to the studio because they were stranded in Connecticut. So Jeff Harris, the manager of Onyx, asked Fredro to come to the studio with his cousin, Kirk Jones, who at the time was doing a solo career under the name Trop and working in the barbershop making a thousand dollars a week cutting high school. Fredro and Sticky Fingaz made two records, "Stik 'N' Muve" and "Exercise". Jam Master Jay liked these songs and that's how Sticky joined the group, because Jay said, "If Sticky ain't in the group, it ain't no group!". Jay signed the group to his label, JMJ Records, for a single deal, then for an EP deal followed by an album deal because they did 10 songs on a budget of 6 songs.

In 1991, despite the reproaches from Fredro, the Onyx's music producer, B-Wiz, sold his drum machine SP-12 and went to Baltimore to sell crack, and eventually he was killed in Baltimore. Thus, all Onyx records were lost.

In 1993, Onyx released their debut album entitled "Bacdafucup". It proved to be a commercial success and eventually went multi-platinum, largely due to the well known single "Slam". Then Onyx released on JMJ Records another two albums: All We Got Iz Us and Shut 'Em Down.

=== Solo career ===
In 2000, Fredro Starr signed a deal with Koch Records and released a mixtape "Firestarr" (Hosted & Mixed by DJ Clue) in the same year. In the following year he released his debut album "Firestarr". From this moment, another nickname is established behind him: Firestarr. Alongside Jill Scott, he contributed to the soundtrack of Save the Last Dance for the lead single of the movie "Shining Through". Starr's next album, Don't Get Mad Get Money, arrived in 2003.

In 2003, Fredro Starr started a new movement "100 Mad". Sticky Fingaz came up with the term "100 Mad". It means the following: "No matter where in the world Onyx, there are always 100 crazy niggas with it". In 2019, "100 Mad" released an album, the title referring to Onyx's artist collective. Production on the album included Snowgoons and The Alchemist, and guest vocalists included Conway The Machine, Tha God Fahim, Jay Nice, Planet Asia, Termanology and more.

In 2011, Fredro Starr founded his own label "Mad Money Movement" in Los Angeles. The first release of the label was his solo album "Made In The Streets", a collaboration album with producer Audible Doctor, which was dropped on December 25, 2013. Other releases include Onyx "#WAKEDAFUCUP" (2014), Onyx "Against All Authorities" (2015), ONYX "#WAKEDAFUCUP Reloaded" (2016), Onyx "#WAKEDAFUCUP Reloaded (Picture Disc Vinyl Import)" (2017), Onyx & Dope D.O.D. "Shotgunz In Hell" (2017), Onyx "Black Rock (Onyx album)" (2018)

On May 13, 2013, Starr released his mixtape and first solo project in 10 years entitled "Live 4Ever, Die 2Day". On November 26, 2013, Starr released his first single from his upcoming third album The Firestarr 2 entitled "What If 2". On January 8, 2014, he released the official video for the single.

On October 4, 2015, at the Milk River restaurant in Brooklyn was held a rap-battle between Fredro Starr and Keith Murray. On the results of 3 rounds, Fredro Starr won with a score of 3–0.

On March 9, 2018, Fredro Starr released his 4th solo album "Firestarr 2" on Mad Money Movement. In 2011, Fredro Starr announced via Twitter that he was working on the follow-up of his debut work. The album was due out in the summer of 2012, but later the release was postponed to the first half of 2013. In the end, the project was abandoned, as Fredro met producer Audible Doctor.

In 2020, Fredro Starr released a video "Fuck Corona" on the subject of the COVID-19 pandemic. The single "Corona Freestyle" was released on April 17. During the year, Fredro Starr took part in the recording of albums by N.B.S. & Snowgoons — Still Trapped In America ("Reparations" feat. Fredro Starr), OptiMystic MC — Salty Waterz 2 ("Get 'em" feat Fredro Starr, MDMC & Sickflo).

On September 7, 2021, together with his younger brother 6ambu Starr (ex-Bambu Gutta), Fredro Starr released 6lunt 6rothers (EP). The release consists of six tracks and was entirely produced by DJ Audas. On August 23, was released the visuals for "Onyx OG" (directed by Pinkall Productions). During the year, Fredro Starr took part in the recording of albums by DJ Kay Slay — Accolades ("Rolling 110 Deep"), Taiyamo Denku — Hip-Hop Or Death ("Follow My Lead" feat. Fredro Starr), Outlawz — One Nation ("Dat Cloth" feat. Supreme C, Fredro Starr, Kxng Crooked), Dope D.O.D. & ChuBeats — The Whole Planet Shifted ("Cold Summer" feat. Fredro Starr, Rook Da Ruckus, Willy Snypa & SickFlo).

On September 2, 2022, 100 Mad released on digital platforms a 6-track EP by rapper Phenam Presto, entirely produced by Fredro Starr. The track "Brazil" was adapted for the screen. On September 23, was released Smoovth's album Project Near You, entirely produced by Fredro Starr. The recording featured Hus Kingpin and JD Era. A music video was filmed for "Project Near You" (feat. Fredro Starr) (directed by Akin Films). On November 4, 100 Mad released on digital platforms Fredro Starr's fifth studio album Jazz. The album got its name from the genre of the original samples used in creating the music. The release consists of 10 tracks. The album featured rappers Jonny Vulgar, N.B.S., Mac Mason, Harrd Luck, Marin Big Bags, and Jonny Vegas. All the music for the album was produced by Fredro himself, and each one wrote his own lyrics. Videos were filmed for the tracks "Heartbeat" (feat. Mac Mason) and "Electric Hummers" (feat. N.B.S.) (both videos were directed by Droneworks Ent). During the year, Fredro Starr took part in the recording of albums by Snowgoons — Renaissance Kings ("The 90’s Are Back Pt. 3" feat. Chi-Ali, Royal Flush, Nocturnal, Sadat X, D.V. Alias Khryst, Fredro Starr, Ali Vegas & Will Sully), V Knuckles (N.B.S.) — Winter Warfare ("G’z Up" feat. Millyz & Fredro Starr), Fortunato "All We Know" feat. Fredro Starr (Produced by Snowgoons), DJ Audas — 100 Mad Presents: Oros Tape, Vol. 1 ("Ya’ Don’t Stop" by Fredro Starr, N.B.S. & DJ Audas), McGyver — Camillionizm ("187" feat. Fredro Starr), Termanology — Determination ("Shut 'Em Down Again" feat. Fredro Starr).

In early 2023, Fredro Starr announced the end of his musical career. However, by the end of the year, on November 17, 2023, 100 Mad released on digital platforms Fredro Starr's sixth studio album Legends Corner. The album featured rappers RJ Payne, Sheek Louch, Jacob G., Mr. Cheeks, Nature. The entire album was produced by Jay Wex and Fredro himself. The video for "Down Like That" (directed by Pinkall Productions) was released two years ago, on November 13, 2021. On December 8, 2023, 100 Mad released the compilation Beats by Dro, Vol. 1, consisting of 11 tracks featuring Starr's music. Featuring Harrd Luck, Ricky Bats, Inspectah Deck, N.B.S., LaQuan, Jody Larenz, SmooVth, Hus KingPin, Manolo Rose, Illa Ghee, Lord Nez, JD Era, Jiggidy, Mysonne, Jonny Vulgar, Zab Judah, Da Inphamus Amadeuz. During the year, Fredro Starr took part in the recording of albums by Snowgoons — 1st of da Month Vol. 2 ("Metaverse" feat. Fredro Starr & DoItAll), Skits Vicious (Dope D.O.D.) — Nice Night for a Walk Volume 1 ("White Noise" feat. Fredro Starr), Meeco & DJ Access — We Run Shit ("Mentality" feat. Lil Fame & Fredro Starr), Gotham City Boys & Ricky Bats — Gotham City Boys ("Squad with Me" feat. Fredro Starr, Rel Lyfe, Pop Burna, Smiley the Ghetto Child & Drew Wolf), Jay NiCE — Rise & Shine ("Los Angeles Times" feat. Fredro Starr & Recognize Ali), V Knuckles & Phoniks — The Next Chapter ("Fully Loaded" feat. Fredro Starr & Flash), DJ Kay Slay — Rolling 200 Deep ("Rolling 200 Deep XIII" feat. Young Buck, 88 LO, Smooth B, King Malachi, Master Rob, Vita, Merkules, Nytro, Iron Sheikh, Bishop Lamont, Capitalist, Jade Diamonds, Sparky D & Fredro Starr).

On May 20, 2024, together with his younger brother 6ambu Starr (ex-Bambu Gutta), Fredro Starr released the second part of 6lunt 6rothers, Vol. 2 (EP). The release consists of five tracks and was entirely produced by DJ Audas. Two tracks featured rappers Ricky Bats and WhoSane (Fredro's younger brother). On June 7, was released the visuals for "Blunt Brothers" (feat. Whosane) (directed by Briese.Digital), and on August 19 — "#QGTM" (directed by Akin Films). On June 28, 100 Mad released on digital platforms the UFO Fev's album Strapped, entirely produced by Fredro Starr. The recording featured Red Inf, Termanology and Tek. It featured a videos for "Fast Life", "Batumi" and "Peace God" (all videos was directed by Akin Films). On December 27, Starr filmed a joint single with Ricky Bats, "Raze It Up" (directed by Mark Garcia). During the year, he participated in the recording of the album Hus Kingpin & 9th Wonder — The Supergoat ("Box Office" feat. Fredro Starr).

On January 10, 2025, 100 Mad released on digital platforms Fredro Starr's seventh studio album Soul. Similar to his previous release, Jazz (2022), the album was named for the genre of the original samples used to create the music. The release consists of 10 tracks and was recorded at The Watche Studio in North Hollywood, California. The album featured rappers Pryce Whyte, Siggy, Big Al, and Ricky Bats. All the music for the album was produced by Fredro himself, and each one wrote his own lyrics. It featured a video for "Hood Jealousy", which follows Starr as he and his friends head to his neighborhood to smoke marijuana and rap while his girlfriend waits for him in the car. On February 4, a video for the track "Back in Reverse" (directed by Akin Films) was released, similar in plot to the previous video: Starr is still spending the evening in one of the New York City areas and rhyming with rapper Big Al on the topic of representation. On March 28, 2025, 100 Mad released the compilation Beats By Dro, Vol. 2, consisting of 11 tracks featuring Starr's music. Featuring Ufo Fev, Rayza, Ricky Bats, Laquan, YaH-Ra, Red Inf, Jody Larenz, Kidd Pryde.

=== Yung Onyx ===
In 2006, Starr formed a new group called Yung Onyx, but the group later disbanded.

== Acting career ==
Encouraged by his manager, Jeff Harris, to try his hand at acting, Fredro Starr began reading for roles and was immediately selected to co-star in a television pilot called B Boys (1992). Unfortunately, the project was soon abandoned. Less than a year later, he landed his first role as Bamboo in Forest Whitaker's critically acclaimed HBO film Strapped, which earned him a CableACE Award nomination for "Best Supporting Actor". Fredro Starr also starred in the critically acclaimed drama Clockers, and in Abel Ferrara's The Addiction. Starr moves into his first leading role as Shorty in Sunset Park. In addition to starring in Sunset Park, Fredro co-wrote and performs the title track "Thangz Changed".

Other film credits include Ride, Light It Up, and Save the Last Dance.

On television, Starr had a regular role on Moesha as the title character's boyfriend and fiancé. He appeared in three episodes of HBO's The Wire as Marquis "Bird" Hilton. Starr co-hosted Paramount Domestic Television's daily half-hour urban dance competition, Dance 360, with actor Kel Mitchell. The program aired for one season in 2004 before being canceled due to poor ratings.

Starr also filmed guest appearances on NYPD Blue, Law & Order, Blade: The Series (in which Sticky Fingaz starred in the title role), and Promised Land. He played Ricky Gannon on a CSI: Miami episode that aired February 2, 2009, and appeared on New York Undercover in the episode entitled "Student Affairs."

Fredro produced a documentary about his mentor, Jam Master Jay, entitled Two Turntables and a Microphone: The Life and Death of Jam Master Jay and served as Executive Consultant on the Sticky Fingaz-directed Lionsgate hip-hop musical feature film, A Day in the Life, which he also stars in.

Between 2009 and 2010, Starr starred in 12 episodes for the web series Tales of the Industry. Director: Sanz Pareil TV (Sanz Pareil & Brian "BK" Kim).

In 2012, Starr starred in 20 episodes for the web series 16 Bars with Fredro Starr. Director: Myster DL.

Starr plays the lead in the independent feature-length film Diamond Ruff, which had its premiere in Hartford, Connecticut on November 1, 2013.

In 2018, was filmed the movie Firestarr 2, consisting of video clips for songs from the album Firestarr 2.

== Other career ==
In 2011, Fredro Starr released two children's books: "Lil Freddy: The Red Sock" and "Lil Freddy: The Bully Kid".

== Controversy ==
=== 50 Cent ===
The beef between Onyx and 50 Cent started on Def Jam's "Survival of the Illest" concert at the Apollo Theater. The concert was held on July 18, 1998. During performing the song "React" rapper Scarred 4 Life performed 50 Cent's verse. A few years later according to the Rap News Network, 50 Cent started a confrontation with Starr at the 2003 Vibe Awards. In a 2003 interview Starr explained, "50 Cent basically started shit with me, started a scuffle, and a bodyguard broke us up. He's a punk. He's disrespectful to Jam Master Jay ever since he passed." In an interview with The Source, Fredro Starr said that 50 Cent had been disrespectful towards the Onyx rap group even though Onyx had given him his first breakthrough on a song called "React" from the 1998 album, Shut 'Em Down. In a 2008 interview for AllHipHop Fredro made a comment about 50 Cent.

=== Brandy ===
In a 2008 interview for C.O.D DVD (now called Forbez DVD) Fredro talked about relations with R&B singer Brandy but later said "I never meant to put her on blast and say she gave me head. It was a joke and the media ran with it. That's what it was."

=== DMX ===
On September 18, 2012, Fredro Starr dropped a freestyle that was aimed at fellow pioneer New York City rapper DMX. On September 26, 2012, during a radio interview DMX responded to the diss.

== Personal life ==
His cousin and fellow Onyx group member is Sticky Fingaz. Fredro Starr has 3 children, with his wife, Croatian model Korina Longin, whom he married in 2007.

== Discography ==
Studio albums

- Firestarr (2001)
- Don't Get Mad Get Money (2003)
- Made in the Streets (2013)
- Firestarr 2 (2018)
- Jazz (2022)
- Legends Corner (2023)
- Soul (2025)

EP

- A Few Joints (2021)
- 6lunt 6rothers (with 6ambu Starr) (2021)
- 6lunt 6rothers, Vol. 2 (with 6ambu Starr) (2024)

Compilation albums

- Soul on Fire (2021)
- Stash Box (2021)
- 16 Bars wit Firestarr (2021)
- Real Rap wit Fredro Starr (2021)
- Beats by Dro, Vol. 1 (2023)
- Beats by Dro, Vol. 2 (2025)

Mixtapes

- Firestarr (Mix-Tape) (Hosted & Mixed by DJ Clue) (2000)
- Live 4ever Die 2day (2013)

Albums as a producer

- Onyx — All We Got Iz Us (produced by Fredro Starr, Sticky Fingaz, Sonee Seeza, 8-Off Assassin) (1995)
- Phenam — Presto (EP) (produced by Fredro Starr) (2022)
- Smoovth — Project Near You (produced by Fredro Starr) (2022)
- UFO Fev — Strapped (produced by Fredro Starr) (2024)
- JD Era — Yellow Goose (produced by Fredro Starr) (2025)
- Jay Nice — Flairstarr (produced by Fredro Starr) (2025)

== Awards and nominations ==
Year	Award	Nominated work	Category	Result
1994	American Music Awards of 1994	"Bacdafucup"	Rap/Hip-Hop New Artist	Nominated
1994	1994 Soul Train Music Awards	"Bacdafucup"	Best Rap Album	Won

== Filmography ==
=== Films ===
Year	Title	Role	Notes
1993	Strapped	Bamboo	TV movie
1995	The Addiction	Black	
1995	Clockers	Go	
1996	Sunset Park	Shorty	
1998	Ride	Geronimo	
1999	Black and White	Himself	
1999	Light It Up	Rodney J. Templeton	
2001	Save the Last Dance	Malakai	
2001	Flossin	D-Mack	
2001	Commitments	Himself	TV movie
2004	Torque	Junior	
2004	Almost Gangsta	Ice Cold	Short
2005	Ganked	Ice Pick	Video
2005	Detroit Hoopz	Erick Powell	Video
2006	Loyalty & Respect	Himself	
2006	My Brother	Pharaoh	
2006	Forbidden Fruits	Brian Casey	Video
2007	Vegas Vampires	Carl Weaver	
2007	All Lies on Me	J-Dub	Video
2008	Show Stoppers	Clem	
2008	Darling Nikki: The Movie	Jason	
2008	Nite Tales: The Movie	Twan	
2008	The Next Hit	Rodson Gray	
2009	A Day in the Life	Phya	
2009	Busted	AK	
2009	The Eddie Black Story	Psycho	
2011	Comrades	Cy	
2011	Queen of Media	Lamont	
2011	After Hours: The Movie	Rocko	
2013	Deceitful	Isaac	
2015	Diamond Ruff	Diamond Ruff	
2015	The Road Movie	Fredro Starr	Short
2017	The Fearless One	Wali	
2018	88 (proof of concept)	Pops Freeman	TV movie
2019	Clinton Road	Fredro	
2019	Duke	Jimmy	
2020	Equal Standard	Du	
2020	For NYC	Tyrone	Short
2020	Young Ballerz	Coach Rich Daniels	Short
2021	Asbury Park	Jerome	
2022	Kill Box	Tre	

=== Television ===
Year	Title	Role	Notes
1994	Law & Order	Tony 'G-Dog' Rowland	Episode: "Competence"
1995	New York Undercover	Alphonse	Episode: "Student Affairs"
1996	Dangerous Minds	Kareem	Episode: "Evolution"
1996–2000	Moesha	Quinton "Q" Brooks	Main cast: seasons 2–3, Guest: season 4, recurring cast: seasons 5–6
1998	In the House	Trey	Episode: "Mr. Hill Goes to New York"
1998	Promised Land	Marley	Episode: "Denver, Welcome Home"
1998	NYPD Blue	Leon	Episode: "Speak for Yourself, Bruce Clayton"
2002	NYPD Blue	Terrell 'Charles' Cooper	Episode: "Death by Cycle"
2002–03	The Wire	Marquis 'Bird' Hilton	Episode: "The Pager, One Arrest, All Prologue"
2003	Karen Sisco	6-Pak	Episode: "Justice"
2004	Dance 360	Himself/co-host	Main Co-Host
2004	Method & Red	Fear	Episode: "Da Shootout"
2006	Blade	Jermaine Turner	Episode: "Bloodlines"
2009	CSI: Miami	Ricky Gannon	Episode: "Smoke Gets in Your CSIs"
2009	CSI: NY	Deacon	Episode: "Cuckoo's Nest"
2016	The Grind TV 1.0	Pipino	Episode: "Theft"
2011	Ultimate MC	Terrance	TV series
2022	Bust Down	Reebok	Episode: "Beige Rage"

=== Video games ===
Year	Title	Role	Notes
1995	Rap Jam: Volume One	Himself	

=== Music videos ===
Year	Title	Artist	Role
2000	Let's Get Married	Jagged Edge	Man in couple

== Bibliography ==
- Slam: Let the Boyz B Boyz (TBA)
