= Warren G discography =

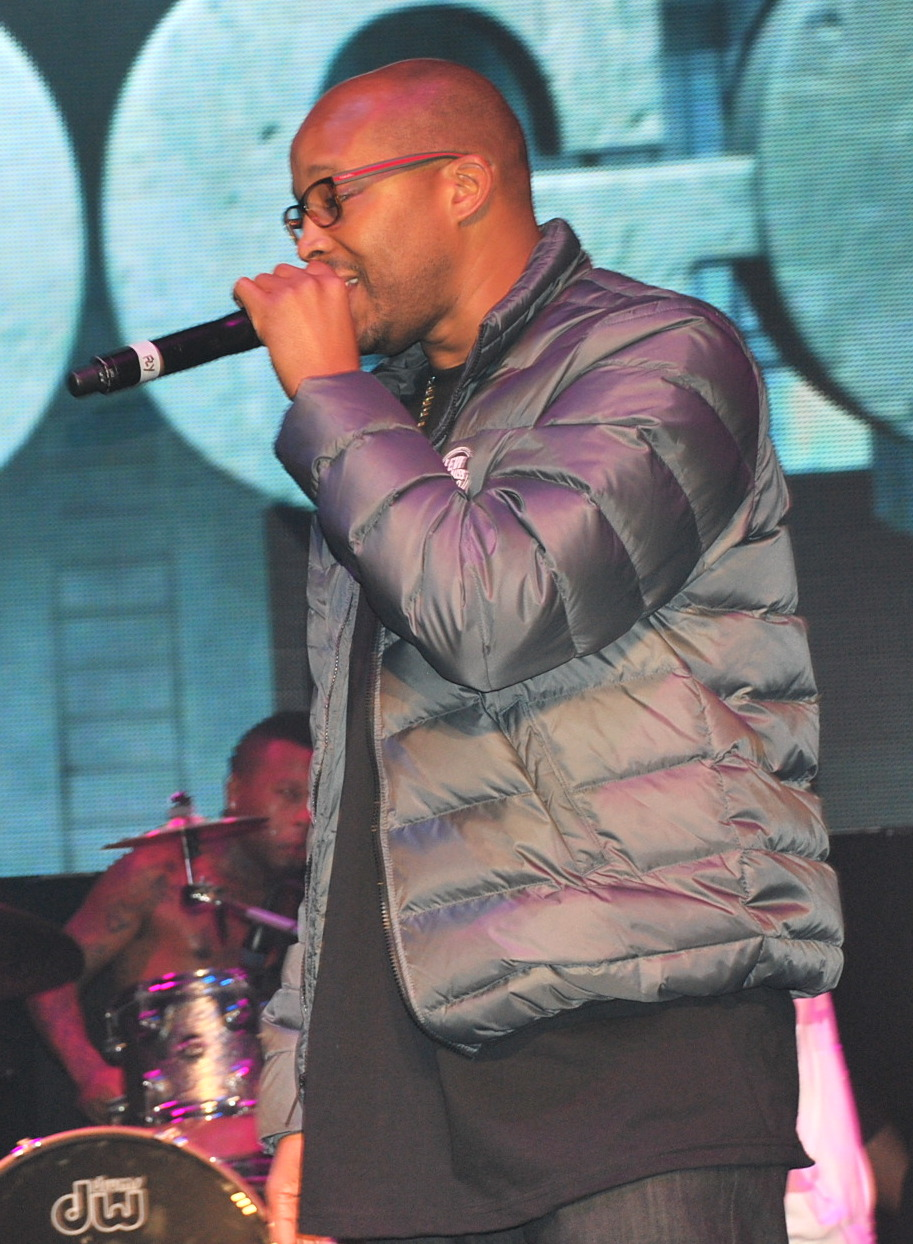
- Studio albums: 6
- Extended plays: 1
- Soundtrack albums: 1
- Singles: 17
- Music videos: 19

This discography of American rapper Warren G consists of 6 studio albums, 1 EP (extended play), 17 singles, 1 soundtrack album and 19 music videos.

== Albums ==
=== Studio albums ===
List of studio albums, with selected chart positions, sales figures and certifications
Title	Album details	Peak chart positions										Sales	Certifications
Title	Album details	US	US R&B	AUS	CAN	FRA	GER	NZ	SWE	SWI	UK	Sales	Certifications
Regulate... G Funk Era	Released: June 7, 1994; Label: Violator, Def Jam; Format: CD, LP, cassette, digital download	2	1	42	27	—	15	26	12	—	25	US: 3,000,000	RIAA: 3× Platinum; BPI: Silver; MC: Gold; SNEP: Gold
Take a Look Over Your Shoulder	Released: March 25, 1997; Label: G-Funk, Def Jam; Format: CD, LP, cassette, digital download	11	4	22	20	14	8	10	25	9	20	US: 767,000	RIAA: Gold; BPI: Silver
I Want It All	Released: October 12, 1999; Label: G-Funk, Restless; Format: CD, LP, cassette, digital download	21	4	57	56	54	82	—	—	—	—		RIAA: Gold
The Return of the Regulator	Released: December 11, 2001; Label: G-Funk, Universal; Format: CD, LP, cassette, digital download	83	14	—	—	87	—	—	—	—	—		
In the Mid-Nite Hour	Released: October 11, 2005; Label: G-Funk, Hawino; Format: CD, LP, digital download	80	15	—	—	—	—	—	—	—	—		
The G Files	Released: September 29, 2009; Label: TTL, Koch; Format: CD, digital download	—	88	—	—	—	—	—	—	—	—		

=== Collaborative albums ===
List of collaborative albums, with selected chart positions, sales figures and certifications
Title	Album details	Peak chart positions											Sales	Certifications (sales threshold)
Title	Album details	US	US Ind	US R&B/HH	AUS	BEL	CAN	DUT	GER	NZ	SWI	UK R&B	Sales	Certifications (sales threshold)
The Hard Way (with 213)	Released: August 17, 2004; Label: Doggystyle, TVT; Format: CD, LP, cassette, digital download	4	1	1	50	57	3	57	34	21	33	35	US: 500,000	RIAA: Gold; MC: Gold

== Extended plays ==
List of extended plays, with selected chart positions
Title	EP details	Peak chart positions
Title	EP details	US R&B/HH
Regulate... G Funk Era, Part II	Released: August 6, 2015; Label: G-Funk; Format: Digital download	34

== Singles ==
=== As lead artist ===
List of singles as lead artist, with selected chart positions and certifications, showing year released and album name
Title	Year	Peak chart positions										Certifications	Album
Title	Year	US	US R&B	US Rap	AUS	FRA	GER	NZ	SWE	SWI	UK	Certifications	Album
"Regulate" (featuring Nate Dogg)	1994	2	7	1	16	7	7	5	4	5	5	RIAA: 2× Platinum; ARIA: Gold; BPI: 2× Platinum; BVMI: Gold; RMNZ: 5× Platinum	Above the Rim (soundtrack) / Regulate... G Funk Era
"This D.J."	1994	9	14	3	95	25	37	5	22	—	12	RIAA: Gold; RMNZ: Platinum	Regulate... G Funk Era
"Do You See"	1994	42	45	11	—	—	—	49	—	—	29		Regulate... G Funk Era
"What's Love Got to Do with It" (featuring Adina Howard)	1996	32	36	5	2	9	3	1	2	6	2	ARIA: Platinum; BPI: Gold; BVMI: Gold; RMNZ: Platinum	Supercop (soundtrack) / Take a Look Over Your Shoulder
"I Shot the Sheriff"	1997	20	16	5	8	30	27	1	11	12	2	RIAA: Gold; ARIA: Gold; RMNZ: Gold	Take a Look Over Your Shoulder
"Smokin' Me Out" (featuring Ron Isley)	1997	35	20	4	70	21	—	3	—	—	14	RMNZ: Gold	Take a Look Over Your Shoulder
"I Want It All" (featuring Mack 10)	1999	23	11	1	88	—	—	—	—	—	—	RIAA: Gold	I Want It All
"Game Don't Wait" (Remix) (featuring 213 and Xzibit)	1999	—	58	—	—	—	—	—	—	—	—		I Want It All
"Lookin' at You"	2001	—	72	—	—	45	—	—	—	—	60		The Return of the Regulator
"Ghetto Village"	2002	—	112	—	—	—	—	—	—	—	—		The Return of the Regulator
"Get U Down" (featuring B-Real and Side Effect)	2005	—	120	—	—	—	—	—	—	—	—		In the Mid-Nite Hour
"I Need a Light" (featuring Nate Dogg)	2005	—	—	—	—	—	—	—	—	—	—		In the Mid-Nite Hour
"Ringtone"	2009	—	—	—	—	—	—	—	—	—	—		The G Files
"Crush" (featuring Ray J)	2009	—	—	—	—	—	—	—	—	—	—		The G Files
"Party We Will Throw Now!" (featuring Nate Dogg and The Game)	2012	—	—	—	—	—	—	—	—	—	—	RMNZ: Platinum	Non-album single
"My House" (featuring Nate Dogg)	2015	—	—	—	—	—	—	—	—	—	—		Regulate... G Funk Era, Part II
"And You Know That" (featuring Ty Dolla $ign)	2020	—	—	—	—	—	—	—	—	—	—		Non-album single
"Life is Beautiful"	2022	—	—	—	—	—	—	—	—	—	—		TBA
"—" denotes a recording that did not chart or was not released in that territory.

=== As featured artist ===
List of singles as featured performer, with selected chart positions and certifications, showing year released and album name
Title	Year	Peak chart positions										Certifications	Album
Title	Year	US	US R&B	AUS	BEL (FL)	FRA	GER	NZ	SWE	SWI	UK	Certifications	Album
"Indo Smoke" (Mista Grimm featuring Warren G & Nate Dogg)	1993	—	—	—	—	—	—	—	—	—	—		Poetic Justice
"Behind Bars" (Dum Ditty Dum Mix) (Slick Rick featuring Warren G)	1994	—	—	—	—	—	—	—	—	—	—		Behind Bars
"Prince Igor" (The Rapsody featuring Warren G and Sissel)	1997	—	—	—	9	6	8	41	3	11	15	BEA: Gold; BVMI: Gold; IFPI SWE: Platinum	The Rapsody Overture
"All Night, All Right" (Peter Andre featuring Warren G)	1998	—	—	30	49	—	74	13	48	—	16		Time
"Nobody Does It Better" (Nate Dogg featuring Warren G)	1998	18	18	—	—	—	71	—	—	—	—		Woo / G-Funk Classics, Vol. 1 & 2
"Wake Up" (Shade Sheist featuring Nate Dogg and Warren G)	2002	—	53	—	—	—	—	—	—	—	—		Informal Introduction
"—" denotes a recording that did not chart or was not released in that territory.

=== Promotional singles ===
List of singles, showing year released and album name
Title	Year	Album
"Birthday" (Refix) (Mark Morrison featuring Warren G and Trina)	2012	Non-album single

== Other certified songs ==
List of songs, with selected certifications, showing year released and album name
Title	Year	Certifications	Album
"Ain't No Fun (If the Homies Can't Have None)" (Snoop Dogg featuring Nate Dogg, Warren G and Kurupt)	1994	RMNZ: Platinum	Doggystyle

== Guest appearances ==
List of non-single guest appearances, with other performing artists, showing year released and album name
Title	Year	Other artist(s)	Album
"Deeez Nuuuts"	1992	Dr. Dre, Snoop Dogg, Nate Dogg, Dat N***a Daz	The Chronic
"Ain't No Fun (If the Homies Can't Have None)"	1993	Snoop Dogg, Nate Dogg, Kurupt	Doggystyle
"Pass the Hooter"	1994	DFC	Things in tha Hood
"Biological Didn't Bother (G-Funk Version)"	1994	Shaquille O'Neal	Shaq Fu: Da Return
"My Dear"	1994	Shaquille O'Neal	Shaq Fu: Da Return
"Flow On"	1994	Cedric Ceballos & Warren G	B-Ball's Best Kept Secret
"1st Round Draft Pick"	1994	The Twinz	Jason's Lyric (soundtrack) / Conversation
"Still Can't Fade It"	1995	Warren G w/ Twinz & Bo-Roc	The Show (soundtrack)
"So Many Ways (Bad Boy Version)"	1995	Warren G	Bad Boys (soundtrack)
"Eastside LB"	1995	Twinz	Conversation
"Sorry I Kept You"	1995	Twinz	Conversation
"Pass It On"	1995	Twinz	Conversation
"We Want Yo' Hands Up"	1996	Warren G w/ Mr. Malik	The Nutty Professor (soundtrack)
"Groupie"	1996	213, Tha Dogg Pound, Charlie Wilson	Tha Doggfather
"Friends"	1997	Val Young	Good Burger (soundtrack)
"Friends"	1998	213	G-Funk Classics, Vol. 1 & 2
"Protectors of 1472"	1998	Jermaine Dupri, Snoop Dogg, R.O.C.	Life in 1472
"Fast Money"	1999	Mac Dre, Kokane, Dutches	Rapper Gone Bad
"Don't Tell"	1999	213, Mausburg	No Limit Top Dogg
"Never Gonna Give It Up"	1999	Kurupt, 213, Tray Dee, Soopafly	Tha Streetz Iz a Mutha
"Be Thankful"	2000	Tha Eastsidaz, Kam	Snoop Dogg Presents: Tha Eastsidaz
"Str8 Westcoast" (Remix)	2002	Knoc-turn'al, Xzibit, Shade Sheist, Nate Dogg	L.A. Confidential presents: Knoc-turn'al
"From Long Beach 2 Brick City"	2002	213, Redman	Paid tha Cost to Be da Boss
"What We Do"	2004	Knoc-turn'al, Nate Dogg, Xzibit	The Way I Am
"I Get Lifted"	2011	Snoop Dogg, Wiz Khalifa, Latoiya Williams	Mac & Devin Go to High School
"Never Had It Like This"	2014	Snoop Dogg, T-Fly	California Times

== Music videos ==
=== As lead artist ===
- 1994: "Regulate"
- 1994: "This DJ"
- 1994: "Do You See"
- 1994: "So Many Ways"
- 1996: "What's Love Got to Do with It"
- 1997: "What We Go Through"
- 1997: "Smokin' Me Out"
- 1997: "I Shot The Sheriff"
- 1997: "Prince Igor"
- 1999: "I Want It All"
- 1999: "Game Don't Wait"
- 2001: "Lookin' at You"
- 2004: "Groupie Love" (as 213)
- 2005: "Get U Down Part"
- 2005: "I Need A Light"
- 2011: "This is Dedicated To You"
- 2012: "Party We Will Throw Now"
- 2012: "No One Could Do it Better"
- 2014: "My House"

=== Cameo appearances ===
- 1992: Dr. Dre - Let Me Ride
- 1992: Dr. Dre - Dre Day (feat. Snoop Dogg)
- 1992: Dr. Dre - Nuthin But a G Thang (feat. Snoop Dogg)
- 1993: Snoop Dogg - What's Ny Name?
- 1994: Snoop Dogg - Gin and Juice
- 1995: The Luniz - I Got 5 On It (Remix) (feat. Dru Down, E-40, Richie Rich, Shock G & Spice 1)
- 1999: Dr. Dre - The Next Episode (feat. Snoop Dogg & Nate Dogg)
- 1999: Snoop Dogg - Just Dippin' (feat. Dr. Dre & Jewell)
- 2002: Ali - Boughetto (feat. Murphy Lee)
- 2002: Snoop Dogg - From tha Chuuuch to da Palace (feat. Pharrell)
- 2003: Obie Trice - The Set Up (feat. Nate Dogg)
- 2005: Snoop Dogg - Ups & Downs\Bang Out (feat. The Bee Gees)
- 2008: E-40 - Wake It Up (feat. Akon)
- 2012: Young Jeezy - Leave You Alone (feat. Ne-Yo)
- 2015: Rap Monster - P.D.D
