= Reasons (Earth, Wind & Fire song) =

Single by Earth, Wind & Fire

Song by Earth, Wind & Fire

from the album That's the Way of the World
- Recorded: Autumn 1974
- Genre: R&B; soul
- Length: 4:59
- Label: Columbia
- Songwriters: Philip Bailey; Charles Stepney; Maurice White

"Reasons" is a love ballad by Earth, Wind & Fire from their sixth studio album That's the Way of the World. The song features the falsetto singing of Philip Bailey on lead vocals.

The ballad is considered a love song by listeners and fans and as such, is often played at weddings - a fact that surprised band members, since the song and lyrics tell a story about a one-night stand ("Longing to love you, just for a night"). After the couple makes love, disillusionment strikes. ("After the love game has been played / All our illusions were just a parade / And all our reasons have to fade.")

== Critical reception ==
Alex Henderson of AllMusic called "Reasons" "a gorgeous ballad". When reviewing the album, Rolling Stone's Gordon Fletcher described the song as among their ballads cut from The Four Tops/Tavares mold. Over twenty years later, one album guide described it as one of the group's seminal hits. The song was also included in the 2023 film Guardians of the Galaxy Vol. 3.

== Charts ==
Chart performance
| Chart (2026) | Peak position |
|---|---|
| Jamaica Airplay (JAMMS) | 6 |

== Reel Tight version ==
"Reasons"

Single by Reel Tight

from the album Back to the Real
- Released: 1999
- Genre: R&B
- Length: 4:30
- Label: G-Funk Records
- Songwriters: Maurice White, Charles Stepney, Philip Bailey
- Producers: Warren G (exec.), Larry Dunn

Reel Tight singles chronology
| "Reasons" (1999) | "I Want U" (1999) |

In 1999, R&B group Reel Tight released a cover of "Reasons" as a single on G-Funk Records for their album Back to the Real. The song reached No. 22 on the Billboard Adult R&B Songs chart.

=== Overview ===
Reel Tight's version of "Reasons" was produced by Larry Dunn and executive produced by Warren G.

== Other covers and samples ==
"Reasons" has also been covered by artists such as The Manhattans on The Manhattans (1976), Miki Howard on Love Confessions (1987), Maxi Priest on Maxi (1987), and Nelson Rangell on Far Away Day (2000). Musiq Soulchild also covered the song on the 2007 Earth, Wind & Fire tribute album Interpretations: Celebrating the Music of Earth, Wind & Fire and Omarion covered the song in 2017.

"Reasons" has been sampled by Master P on "Intro/17 Reasons" featured on his 1995 album 99 Ways to Die and by Shabba Ranks on the song "Muscle Grip" from his 1992 album X-tra Naked. The song was also sampled by Bone Thugs-N-Harmony on "Budsmokers Only" from their 1995 LP E. 1999 Eternal, by Cam'ron on "More Reasons" (featuring Jaheim) from his 2004 album Purple Haze and by E-40 on "Seasoned" from his 1999 album Charlie Hustle: The Blueprint of a Self-Made Millionaire.
