= Edward Tony Green =

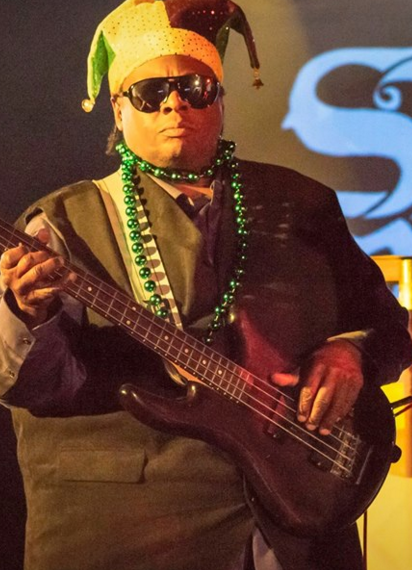
- Green performing in 2015

Background information
- Also known as: T. Money Green
- Born: September 22, 1956 (age 70); Mount Clemens, Michigan
- Origin: Detroit, Michigan, United States
- Genres: Funk, soul, rock, hip hop
- Occupations: Producer, musician, songwriter, composer
- Instrument: Bass guitar
- Years active: 1972 - present
- Labels: Hyped International, Death Row Records, Westbound/Bridgeport, G-Funk Entertainment, Downsound Records, Interscope Records, Stax Records, Bellmark Records, P-Vine Records, Windswept Records
- Website: https://www.hyped.international

Edward Anthony Green (born September 22, 1956) a.k.a. Tony "T. Money" Green is an American bass player, record producer, and award-winning songwriter well known for his work with Death Row Records, Dr. Dre, George Clinton, Five Special, Snoop Dogg, The Dramatics, Tupac, and Warren G.

== Biography ==
Tony began playing the bass at 14 years old. After forming his band in 1971, the Roadwork crew, Tony's passion for the music business grew tremendously. In 1975, L.J. Reynolds from The Dramatics noticed Tony's talent playing at a local club in Detroit. After auditioning for The Dramatics, Tony earned the bass players position in the group. Tony played bass, wrote, and produced many of their many of their hits including four songs from The Dramatic's gold album ‘Do What You Wanna Do’, as well as their last top 10 song ‘Welcome Back Home’.

In 1978, Tony Green and Ron Banks of the Dramatics teamed up with George Clinton and wrote one of hip-hop's most sampled songs ‘One Of Those Funky Things’ from Parliament's ‘Motor Booty Affair’. Even greater success came when Tony became the band director and bass player for Death Row Records in 1993. Throughout the development of the G-Funk sound, Tony's signature bass lines elevated several hit projects that went platinum including the Doggystyle album by Snoop Dogg, the All Eyez on Me album by Tupac, the Poetic Justice Soundtrack, the Above The Rim Soundtrack, the Grammy award-winning ‘Let Me Ride’ (Remix) by Dr. Dre, and Regulate by Warren G.

As Founder and CEO of Hyped International Records, Tony has continued to develop a repertoire of compositions referred to as ‘The Vault’. Many of his projects are an eclectic blend of R&B, Hip-Hop, Funk, Soul, and Rock n’ Roll. His works have been sampled by artists such as DMX, EPMD, Erykah Badu, Ice Cube, Gang Starr, Master P, Ruff Ryders, The Game, and Tupac.

== Discography ==
=== Samples ===
- DMX/Ruff Ryders - ‘The Ruff Ryders Anthem’ from the ‘It's Dark & Hell is Hot’ album (Sample of One of Those Funky Things by Parliament)
- EPMD - ‘Head Banger’ ft. K-Solo & Redman from the ‘Business Never Personal’ album (Sample of One of Those Funky Things by Parliament)
- Erykah Badu - ‘Jump Up In the Air and Stay There’ ft. Lil Wayne & Bilal from the ‘New Amerykah Part Two’ album (Sample of Jump Up In The Air by Original P) & ‘U Don't Have To Call’ from the ‘But You Caint Use My Phone’ mixtape (Sample of 86 Degreez by Kiko ft. T. Money Green)
- Ice Cube - 'I Wanna Kill Sam' from the 'Death Certificate' Album (Sample of One of Those Funky Things by Parliament)
- Gang Starr – ‘Make Em’ Pay’ ft. Krumbsnatcha from the ‘Moment of Truth’ album (Sample of You're Something Special by Parliament)
- Master P - ‘How Ya Do Dat’ ft. Young Bleed and C-Loc from the ‘I'm Bout It’ soundtrack (Sample of One of Those Funky Things by Parliament)
- The Game - ‘Cali Sunshine’ ft. Bilal from the ‘LAX’ album (Sample of California Sunshine by The Dramatics)
- Tupac - ‘Tha Lunatic’ from the ‘2Pacalypse Now’ album (Sample of One of Those Funky Things by Parliament)
- XV – ‘Lights Please Vizzy Remix' ft. J. Cole (Sample of You're Something Special by Five Special)

=== Soundtracks ===
- Writer/Producer/Musician (Bass) for "Above The Rim" on ‘Jus So Ya Know’ by CPO and ‘My Money Right’ by Lord G
- Vocals/Musician (Bass) for "Murder Was The Case" on the entire album including ‘21 Jumpstreet’, ‘What’ Would You Do’, ‘U Better Recognize’, ‘Dollaz + Sense’, ‘The Eulogy’, and ‘One More Day’
- Musician (Bass) for "Clueless" on ‘Rollin With My Homies’ by Coolio
- Musician (Bass) for "Jason's Lyric" on ‘First Round Draft Pick’ by The Twinz ft. Warren G, and ‘Walk Away’ by The Five Footaz
- Musician (Bass) for "Poetic Justice" on ‘Indo Smoke’ by Mista Grimm, and ‘Niggas Don't Give a Fuck’ by Tha Dogg Pound

== Awards and honors ==
- 2017 – The Made Man Detroit Honoree, Presented by the 100 Black Men and Urban League
- 2017 – Detroit Music Awards; Outstanding Rap Recording ‘The Ghetto’, Outstanding Rap Producer, Outstanding Rap Composer
- 2016 – Detroit Music Awards; Outstanding Rap Producer
- 2015 - Detroit Music Awards; Urban Musician
- 2011 – Detroit Music Awards; Outstanding Urban/Funk/Hip-Hop Recording for “One Shot” & Outstanding

Urban/Funk Vocalist

- 2008 – Urban/Funk Award for Musicianship & Urban/Funk Songwriter of the Year
- 1995 – 2008 (in progress)
- 1995 – Source Awards Winner for Soundtrack of the Year for the ‘Above The Rim’ Soundtrack
- 1993 – Grammy Award for the ‘Let Me Ride’ single (honorable mention in lyrics)
- 1980 - ASCAP "Hit Song" Award for The Dramatics "Welcome Back Home"
- 1980 - ASCAP "Hit Song" Award for Five Special's "Why Leave Us Alone"
- 1979 - RIAA Platinum, Writer for George Clinton's "Motor Booty Affair” Album
- 1977 - RIAA Gold, Writer/Musician for The Dramatics "Do What you Wanna Do" Album
