= Supercops =

Supercops, Super Cop, or variation, may refer to:

== Film ==
- Supercop, aka Police Story 3, a 1992 Hong Kong film
  - Supercop (soundtrack), 1996 U.S. soundtrack album for the Hong Kong film
    - "Supercop" (song), 1996 song by Devo off the eponymous soundtrack for the eponymous film, see Supercop (soundtrack)
- Supercop 2, a 1993 Hong Kong follow-up to Supercop
- The Super Cops, a 1974 American film directed by Gordon Parks
- Crime Busters, a 1977 Italian film with alternative title of Two Supercops
- Miami Supercops, a 1985 Italian film
- RoboCop, a 1987 film, whose original working title was SuperCop
- Yes Madam, a 1985 Hong Kong film with Super Cops as its European title
- Ping Lacson: Super Cop, a 2000 Philippine biographical action film

== People ==
- James Simone (born 1948) nicknamed "Super Cop"; of the Cleveland Police
- William Bratton (born 1947) nicknamed "Supercop" by the British press; former NYPD commissioner

=== Fictional characters ===
- Supercop, a motorcycle traffic cop from Scotch & Wry, portrayed by Rikki Fulton

== Other uses ==
- "Supercops" (2010 TV episode) episode 18 of The Good Guys (2010 TV series)

== See also ==
- Super (disambiguation)
- Cop (disambiguation)
