= Back to the Real =

Studio album by Reel Tight
- Released: April 13, 1999
- Genre: R&B
- Length: 56:15
- Labels: G-Funk; Restless
- Producers: Arvel McClinton III; Co-T; Larry Dunn; Reel Tight; Rob Fusari; Sauce; Speedy & Taka; Vincent Herbert; Warren G; Younglord

Singles from Back to the Real
- 1. "(Do You) Wanna Ride" Released: October 13, 1998; 2. "I Want U" Released: March 16, 1999; 3. "Reasons" Released: 1999

Professional ratings
Review scores
| Source | Rating |
|---|---|
| AllMusic | 2.5/5 stars |
| Vibe | (favorable) |

Back to the Real is the only studio album by American R&B group Reel Tight. It was released on April 13, 1999, via G-Funk Music/Restless Records. The album was produced by Warren G, who also served as executive producer, Co-T, Larry Dunn, Vincent Herbert, Rob Fusari, Arvel McClinton III, Sauce, Speedy & Taka, Younglord, and Reel Tight. The album debuted at number 197 on the Billboard 200, number 32 on the Top R&B/Hip-Hop Albums and number 13 on the Heatseekers Albums charts. Its lead single, "(Do You) Wanna Ride", peaked at number 80 on the Billboard Hot 100 and number 32 on the Hot R&B/Hip-Hop Songs charts. The second single, "I Want U", made it to number 38 on the Hot R&B/Hip-Hop Songs chart. The third and final single, a cover version of Earth, Wind & Fire's "Reasons", reached number 22 on the Adult R&B Songs chart.

== Track listing ==
| No. | Title | Length |
|---|---|---|
| 1. | "(Do You) Wanna Ride" | 3:31 |
| 2. | "I Want U" | 3:48 |
| 3. | "I Lied" | 3:02 |
| 4. | "I'm So Sorry" (featuring Jessica) | 4:11 |
| 5. | "No More Pain" | 5:08 |
| 6. | "Don't Wake Me" | 4:38 |
| 7. | "How Can I See" | 4:56 |
| 8. | "Lady" | 4:33 |
| 9. | "Sittin in the Club" | 4:36 |
| 10. | "Don't Be Afraid" | 5:19 |
| 11. | "It's a Lulu Ya'll (Interlude)" | 0:40 |
| 12. | "Reasons (New Millennium Version)" | 6:03 |
| 13. | "Thank You Lord" | 1:25 |
| 14. | "(Do You) Wanna Ride (Diplomat Remix)" (featuring Cam'ron) | 4:25 |
| Total length: | | 56:15 |

== Charts ==
| Chart (1999) | Peak position |
|---|---|
| US Billboard 200 | 197 |
| US Top R&B/Hip-Hop Albums (Billboard) | 32 |
| US Heatseekers Albums (Billboard) | 13 |
