= I Want It All =

I Want It All may refer to:

- "I Want It All" (Queen song), 1989
- I Want It All (album), a 1999 album by Warren G
  - "I Want It All" (Warren G song), 1999
- "I Want It All" (Dangerous Muse song), 2009
- "I Want It All" (High School Musical song), 2008
- "I Want It All" (Eve's Plum song), 1993
- "I Want It All" (Karmin song), 2014
- "I Want It All", a song by Krokus from their album Rock the Block
- "I Want It All", a 2005 song by Depeche Mode from the album Playing the Angel
- "I Want It All", a 2013 song by Arctic Monkeys from the album AM
- "I Want It All", a song by Eurythmics from the album Peace (Eurythmics album)
- "I Want It All", a song by Trans Am from the album Red Line (album)
- "I Want It All," a song from the soundtrack to the 2014 movie Barbie and the Secret Door
- "I Want It All", a song by The Wanted from the album Battleground
- "I Want It All", a 2023 song by The Drums
- "I Want It All", a 2025 song by Rise Against
