= My House (Warren G song) =

Single by Warren G featuring Nate Dogg

from the EP Regulate... G Funk Era, Part II
- Released: July 13, 2015
- Recorded: 2015
- Genre: West Coast hip hop; G-funk
- Length: 2:51
- Label: G-Funk
- Songwriters: Warren Griffin III; Nathaniel Hale
- Producer: Warren G

Warren G singles chronology
"Party We Will Throw Now!" (2012)	"My House" (2015)

Nate Dogg single singles chronology
"Boss' Life" (2007)	"My House" (2015)

"My House" is a song by American rapper Warren G, featuring posthumous vocals from American singer Nate Dogg. was released on July 13, 2015 as the first single of his first EP Regulate... G Funk Era, Part II, with the record label G-Funk Entertainment. The song was produced by Warren G.

== Music video ==
The music video was released on August 6, 2015.

== Track listing ==
- Download digital
1. My House (featuring Nate Dogg) — 2:51

== Release history ==
Region	Date	Format(s)	Label
United States	July 13, 2015	G-Funk Entertainment	Digital download
