= Regulate... G Funk Era, Part II =

EP by Warren G
- Released: August 6, 2015
- Recorded: 2013–15
- Genre: Hip hop; West Coast hip hop; gangsta rap; G-funk
- Length: 15:32
- Label: G-Funk
- Producer: Warren G

Warren G chronology
The G Files (2009)	Regulate... G Funk Era, Part II (2015)

Singles from Regulate... G Funk Era, Part II
- 1. "My House" Released: July 13, 2015

Regulate... G Funk Era, Part II is the first extended play (EP) by American hip hop recording artist Warren G. The EP was released on 6 August 2015 through G-Funk Entertainment. It is Warren G's first project since 2009's The G Files and serves as a sequel to his 1994 debut. The EP is notable for featuring unreleased vocals of the late Nate Dogg, who was a friend of Warren G.

== Commercial performance ==
The song "Keep On Hustlin" peaked at number 119 on the French SNEP chart.

== Track listing ==
All tracks produced by Warren G.

No.	Title	Length
1.	"Intro" (featuring Reverened TaaaDow)	0:52
2.	"My House" (featuring Nate Dogg)	2:51
3.	"Saturday" (featuring E-40, Too Short and Nate Dogg)	3:39
4.	"Keep On Hustlin" (featuring Jeezy, Bun B and Nate Dogg)	3:52
5.	"Dead Wrong" (featuring Nate Dogg)	3:56

== Charts ==
Chart (2015)	Peak position
US Top R&B/Hip-Hop Albums (Billboard)	34
