= List of G-funk artists and producers =

The following list of g-funk artists and producers includes artists and producers who have been described as a part of the G-funk scene at some point in their career. G-funk is a sub-genre of gangsta rap, that emerged in the late '80s and early '90s. Artists who made a couple of songs in the genre but did not fully partake in the genre, such as The D.O.C. on ("The Formula"), and The Notorious B.I.G. on ("Big Poppa"), are omitted from the list.

== G-funk artists and producers ==
- 213
- 2Pac
- 5th Ward Boyz
- Above the Law
- Big Mello
- Bone Thugs-N-Harmony
- C-Bo (The Autopsy era)
- Cold 187um
- Compton's Most Wanted
- Coolio
- Daz Dillinger
- DJ Quik
- Dr. Dre
- Eazy-E
- E.S.G.
- Geto Boys
- Ice Cube
- Jermaine Dupri
- Kokane
- Kurupt
- Lil Zane
- Low Profile
- Mac Dre
- Mack 10
- MC Hammer (The Funky Headhunter era)
- Mista Grimm
- Nate Dogg
- N.W.A
- Paperboy
- Scarface
- Snoop Dogg
- Spice 1
- Suga Free
- Tha Dogg Pound
- Thug Life
- Warren G
- Westside Connection
