= I Want It All (album) =

Studio album by Warren G
- Released: October 12, 1999
- Recorded: 1998–1999
- Genres: West Coast hip-hop; G-funk
- Length: 59:40
- Labels: G-Funk; Restless
- Producers: Warren G; Soopafly; Vada Nobles

Warren G chronology
Take a Look Over Your Shoulder (1997)	I Want It All (1999)	The Return of the Regulator (2001)

Singles from I Want It All
- 1. "I Want It All" Released: August 31, 1999; 2. "Game Don't Wait" Released: September 9, 1999

I Want It All is the third studio album by the American rapper Warren G. It was released on October 12, 1999, via his own label, G-Funk Entertainment, in conjunction with Restless Records. Snoop Dogg, Nate Dogg, Tha Dogg Pound, Mack 10, Eve, Jermaine Dupri, and Slick Rick make guest appearances. I Want It All contains less vocals by Warren G, who focused more on the producing.

== Critical reception ==
Professional ratings
Review scores
Source	Rating
AllMusic	4/5 stars
Q	4/5 stars
RapReviews	7/10
The Source	3.5/5 stars
USA Today	3/4 stars

Entertainment Weekly wrote that Warren G "attempts to regulate his chart position with superstar cameos; but even Snoop Dogg, Eve, and Memphis Bleek can’t bring enough edge."

AllMusic thought that "though I Want It All occasionally skirts the borders of hip-hop lite, it's chocked with quality mid-tempo productions and excellent rapping."

== Track listing ==
All tracks produced by Warren G, except track 8 produced by Soopafly and tracks 10 & 15 produced by Vada Nobles

No.	Title	Length
1.	"Intro"	0:37
2.	"Gangsta Love" (featuring Kurupt, Nate Dogg and RBX)	4:02
3.	"Why Oh Why" (featuring Tha Dogg Pound)	4:01
4.	"Dollars Make Sense" (featuring Crucial Conflict and Kurupt)	4:31
5.	"I Want It All" (featuring Mack 10)	5:07
6.	"Havin' Things" (featuring Jermaine Dupri and Nate Dogg)	3:00
7.	"You Never Know" (featuring Snoop Dogg, Phats Bossi and Reel Tight)	3:44
8.	"My Momma (Ola Mae)"	4:33
9.	"G-Spot" (featuring El DeBarge and Val Young)	5:16
10.	"We Got That" (featuring Eve, Drag-On and Shadow)	3:46
11.	"Dope Beat"	3:19
12.	"World Wide Ryders" (featuring Neb Love and K-Bar)	3:57
13.	"Game Don't Wait" (performed by 213)	4:15
14.	"If We Give You a Chance" (featuring Slick Rick, Phats Bossi and Val Young)	4:13
15.	"I Want It All (Remix)" (featuring Memphis Bleek, Drag-On and Tikki Diamond)	4:14
16.	"Outro"	1:33

== Charts ==
Chart (1999)	Peak position
Canadian R&B Albums (Nielsen SoundScan)	6
US Billboard 200	21
US Top R&B/Hip-Hop Albums (Billboard)	4

== Certifications ==
Region	Certification	Certified units/sales
United States (RIAA)	Gold	500,000^{^}
^{^} Shipments figures based on certification alone.
