= Lookin' at You (song) =

Single by Warren G featuring LaToiya Williams

from the album The Return of the Regulator
- Released: October 30, 2001
- Recorded: 2001
- Genre: G-funk; R&B; West Coast hip hop
- Length: 4:14
- Label: Universal
- Songwriter: Warren Griffin III
- Producer: Dr. Dre

Warren G singles chronology
"Game Don't Wait" (1999)	"Lookin' at You" (2001)	"Get U Down" (2005)

"Lookin' at You" is the lead single released from Warren G's fourth album, The Return of the Regulator. Like his previous single, "Lookin' at You" was produced by his step-brother Dr. Dre and featured R&B singer LaToiya Williams.

To date, "Lookin' at You" is Warren G's last solo single to reach any of the Billboard charts; it peaked at #72 on the US R&B chart. The music video directed by Benny Boom and features actresses Angelle Brooks and Daphnée Duplaix along with fellow rapper WC.

== Single track listing ==
=== A-Side ===
1. "Lookin'at You" (Radio Version)- 4:18
2. "Getaway"- 4:39

=== B-Side ===
1. "Somethin'to Bounce To"- 3:28
2. "Lookin'at You" (Album Version)- 4:15

== Weekly charts ==
Chart (2001–2002)	Peak position
France (SNEP)	45
Scotland Singles (OCC)	84
UK Singles (OCC)	60
UK Hip Hop/R&B (OCC)	13
US Hot R&B/Hip-Hop Songs (Billboard)	72

=== Year-end charts ===
Chart (2002)	Position
UK Urban (Music Week)	39
