= I Shot the Sheriff (Warren G song) =

Single by Warren G

from the album Take a Look Over Your Shoulder
- Released: February 3, 1997
- Genre: Hip hop
- Length: 4:10
- Label: Def Jam
- Songwriters: Bob Marley; Warren Griffin
- Producer: Warren G

Warren G singles chronology
"What's Love Got to Do with It" (1996)	"I Shot the Sheriff" (1997)	"Smokin' Me Out" (1997)

Music video
- "I Shot the Sheriff" on YouTube

"I Shot the Sheriff" is the lead single from American rapper Warren G's second album, Take a Look Over Your Shoulder. The song takes its title from and samples Bob Marley's 1973 song of the same name with R&B singer Nancy Fletcher singing a version of the original chorus, though Warren G, who produced the song himself, replaces Marley's lyrics with those of his own, though Marley is giving sole songwriting credit. The song was a hit in several countries; in Warren G's native US, it peaked at number 20 on the Billboard Hot 100 and was certified gold by the Recording Industry Association of America (RIAA). It was a bigger hit overseas, peaking at number two in the United Kingdom and at number one in New Zealand.

The official remix was produced by EPMD member Erick Sermon, it is based around EPMD's "Strictly Business", which also sampled Clapton's version of the song.

== Charts ==
=== Weekly charts ===
Chart (1997)	Peak position
Australia (ARIA)	8
Austria (Ö3 Austria Top 40)	18
Belgium (Ultratip Bubbling Under Flanders)	16
Belgium (Ultratop 50 Wallonia)	31
Europe (Eurochart Hot 100)	11
Finland (Suomen virallinen lista)	6
France (SNEP)	30
Germany (GfK)	27
Ireland (IRMA)	11
Italy (Musica e dischi)	11
Italy Airplay (Music & Media)	2
Netherlands (Dutch Top 40 Tipparade)	5
Netherlands (Single Top 100)	63
New Zealand (Recorded Music NZ)	1
Norway (VG-lista)	19
Scotland Singles (Official Charts)	9
Sweden (Sverigetopplistan)	11
Switzerland (Schweizer Hitparade)	12
UK Singles (Official Charts)	2
UK Dance (Official Charts)	8
UK Hip Hop/R&B (Official Charts)	1
US Billboard Hot 100	20
US Dance Singles Sales (Billboard)	26
US Hot R&B/Hip-Hop Songs (Billboard)	16
US Hot Rap Songs (Billboard)	5

=== Year-end charts ===
Chart (1997)	Position
Australia (ARIA)	58
New Zealand (RIANZ)	19
Romania (Romanian Top 100)	71
UK Singles (OCC)	77
US Billboard Hot 100	85

== Certifications ==
Region	Certification	Certified units/sales
Australia (ARIA)	Gold	35,000^{^}
New Zealand (RMNZ)	Gold	5,000^{*}
United States (RIAA)	Gold	600,000
^{*} Sales figures based on certification alone.^{^} Shipments figures based on certification alone.

== Release history ==
Region	Date	Format(s)	Label(s)	Ref.
Worldwide	February 3, 1997	—N/a	Def Jam	
United Kingdom	February 10, 1997	12-inch vinyl; CD; cassette	Def Jam	
United States	February 11, 1997	12-inch vinyl	Def Jam	
United States	February 25, 1997	Rhythmic contemporary radio	Def Jam	
Japan	February 26, 1997	CD	Def Jam	
