= Game Don't Wait =

Single by Warren G featuring Nate Dogg, Snoop Dogg and Xzibit

from the album I Want It All
- B-side: "Game Don't Wait"
- Released: September 9, 1999
- Recorded: 1999
- Genre: Hip hop
- Length: 3:47
- Label: Restless

Warren G singles chronology
"I Want It All" (1999)	"Game Don't Wait" (1999)	"Lookin' at You" (2001)

Snoop Dogg singles chronology
"Chin Check" (1999)	"Game Don't Wait" (1999)	"Down for My N's" (1999)

Nate Dogg singles chronology
"Bitch Please" (1999)	"Game Don't Wait" (1999)	"The Next Episode" (2000)

Xzibit singles chronology
"Bitch Please" (1999)	"Game Don't Wait" (1999)	"Year 2000" (2000)

Game Don't Wait is the second single released from Warren G's third album, I Want It All. The remix of the song, which was the version released as a single, was produced by Warren G's stepbrother Dr. Dre and featured fellow 213 members Nate Dogg and Snoop Dogg, as well as Xzibit. It peaked at 58 on the Hot R&B/Hip-Hop Singles & Tracks. The original song was produced by Warren G and featured only Nate Dogg and Snoop Dogg.

== Single track listing ==
1. "Game Don't Wait" (Remix) (Clean)- 3:35
2. "Game Don't Wait" (Remix) (Album)- 3:47
3. "Game Don't Wait" (Remix) (Instrumental)- 3:33
4. "Game Don't Wait" (Remix) (A Cappella)- 3:04

=== B-Side ===
1. "Game Don't Wait" (Clean)- 4:16
2. "Game Don't Wait" (Album)- 4:15
3. "Game Don't Wait" (Instrumental)- 4:15
4. "Game Don't Wait" (A Cappella)- 4:15

== Charts ==
Chart (2000)	Peak position
US Hot R&B/Hip-Hop Songs (Billboard)	58
US Hot R&B/Hip-Hop Airplay (Billboard)	54
