= This D.J. =

Single by Warren G

from the album Regulate... G Funk Era
- B-side: "Regulate" (remix)
- Released: July 5, 1994
- Studio: Track Record, Inc. (North Hollywood, Los Angeles)
- Genre: G-funk
- Length: 3:23
- Label: Violator; RAL
- Songwriters: Warren Griffin; Calvin Broadus (uncredited)
- Producer: Warren G

Warren G singles chronology
"Regulate" (1994)	"This D.J." (1994)	"Do You See" (1994)

Music video
- "This D.J." on YouTube

"This D.J." is a song by American hip hop artist Warren G, released in July 1994 by Def Jam as the second single from his debut album, Regulate...G Funk Era (1994). Released as the follow-up to his hit song "Regulate", "This D.J." was another success for Warren G, becoming his second consecutive top-10 single in the US, peaking at number nine on the Billboard Hot 100 and receiving gold certification by the Recording Industry Association of America (RIAA), having sold 600,000 copies.

Warren G revealed in 2023, during an interview for Drink Champs, that "This DJ"'s chorus was written by Snoop Dogg, that was supposed to perform it as well, but because of discrepancies between their labels, he couldn't be on the song and Warren G performed it instead. Because of the label's involvement, Snoop Dogg was ultimately not credited for the writing as well. The song was nominated for the Best Rap Solo Performance at the 37th Annual Grammy Awards.

== Critical reception ==
Larry Flick from Billboard magazine wrote, "This gangsta-funk follow-up [to 'Regulate'] is a solid sophomore shot aimed directly at the top spot. The rhythm is strictly laid-back, with a lazy bass line, casual lyrical flow, and cooing female backup vocals." Taylor Parkes from Melody Maker named it Single of the Week, describing it as "smoother still, an ecstatic groove." Pan-European magazine Music & Media commented, "Regulate your choices, DJs out there. Please don't forget to add a chunk of lazy hip hop. Warren G's got such incredible swing in a field overcrowded by hyper-stiff two left-legged dance acts." Dele Fadele from NME came to the conclusion that the song is "a good thing, a way to sidestep reality and just luxuriate in sound. Whistling keyboard noises, boosted bass, subtle guitar licks, no obvious Michael McDonald sample, and the smooth, considered rapping all add up to pop thrills." Jordan Paramor from Smash Hits gave it a score of four out of five, writing, "WHOA! Close your eyes and suddenly you're in downtown LA, cruising through the backstreets, bopping along to another funky laid-back masterpiece from Mr Warren G Esq. He's undoubtedly the king of cool (even if he does use rude words). Buy it, you'll love it."

== Single track listing ==
=== A-Side ===
1. "This D.J." (LP Version)- 3:23
2. "This D.J." (Radio Edit)- 3:23

=== B-Side ===
1. "This D.J." (LP Instrumental)- 3:23
2. "This D.J." (Remix Instrumental)- 3:43
3. "Regulate" (Remix)- 4:18

== Charts ==
=== Weekly charts ===
Chart (1994)	Peak position
Australia (ARIA)	95
Europe (Eurochart Hot 100)	39
France (SNEP)	25
Germany (GfK)	37
Iceland (Íslenski Listinn Topp 40)	28
New Zealand (Recorded Music NZ)	5
Scottish Singles Sales (Official Charts)	12
Sweden (Sverigetopplistan)	22
UK Singles (Official Charts)	12
UK Dance (Official Charts)	10
UK Hip Hop/R&B (Official Charts)	9
UK Airplay (Music Week)	36
UK Club Chart (Music Week)	51
US Billboard Hot 100	9
US Dance Singles Sales (Billboard)	3
US Hot R&B/Hip-Hop Songs (Billboard)	14
US Hot Rap Songs (Billboard)	3
US Rhythmic Airplay (Billboard)	5

=== Year-end charts ===
Chart (1994)	Position
UK Singles (OCC)	172
US Billboard Hot 100	59
US Hot R&B Singles (Billboard)	81
US Hot Rap Singles (Billboard)	22
US Maxi-Singles Sales (Billboard)	38

== Certifications ==
Region	Certification	Certified units/sales
New Zealand (RMNZ)	Platinum	30,000^{‡}
United States (RIAA)	Gold	500,000^{^}
^{^} Shipments figures based on certification alone.^{‡} Sales+streaming figures based on certification alone.
