= Take a Look Over Your Shoulder =

1997 studio album by Warren G

Take a Look Over Your Shoulder (Reality)

Studio album by Warren G
- Released: March 25, 1997
- Studios: G-Funk Studios (Lakewood, CA); Golden Lady (New York, NY); Track Record (North Hollywood, CA); Lighthouse Studios; Enterprise Recording Studios (Burbank, CA)
- Genres: West Coast hip-hop; gangsta rap; G-funk
- Length: 52:33
- Label: Rush Associated Labels
- Producer: Warren G

Warren G chronology
Regulate... G Funk Era (1994)	Take a Look Over Your Shoulder (Reality) (1997)	I Want It All (1999)

Singles from Take a Look Over Your Shoulder (Reality)
- 1. "What's Love Got to Do with It" Released: August 6, 1996; 2. "I Shot the Sheriff" Released: February 10, 1997; 3. "Smokin' Me Out" Released: May 6, 1997

Professional ratings
Review scores
Source	Rating
AllMusic	2/5 stars
Entertainment Weekly	B+
Muzik	2/10
NME	8/10
RapReviews	8.5/10
Rolling Stone	3.5/5 stars
Spin	6/10
The New Rolling Stone Album Guide	2/5 stars
The Source	3.5/5 stars
The Village Voice	(dud)

Take a Look Over Your Shoulder is the second solo studio album by American hip-hop musician Warren G. It was released on March 25, 1997, via Rush Associated Labels. The recording sessions took place at G-Funk Studios in Lakewood, Golden Lady in New York, Track Record in North Hollywood, LightHouse Studios, and Enterprise Recording Studios in Burbank. Produced by Warren G, it features guest appearances from Adina Howard, Arnita Porter, Bad Azz, Dorinda Roberts, Jah-Skillz, Jayo Felony, K-9, Knee-Hi, Mr. Malik, Nancy Fletcher, Nate Dogg, Neb Luv, PC, Perfec, Reel Tight, Ricky Harris, Ronald Isley, and Twinz.

In the United States, the album peaked at number 11 on the Billboard 200 and number 4 on the Top R&B/Hip-Hop Albums charts. It was certified gold by the Recording Industry Association of America on May 28, 1997, for sales of over 500,000 in the US alone. The album was supported with three charted singles: "What's Love Got to Do with It", "I Shot the Sheriff" and "Smokin' Me Out". The lyrics off the track "Reality" were also used in "Prince Igor", a collaboration with the Rapsody and Sissel Kyrkjebø.

== Track listing ==
No.	Title	Writer(s)	Length
1.	"Intro"	Warren G Griffin	0:32
2.	"Annie Mae (featuring Nate Dogg)"	Griffin; Nathaniel Hale	3:52
3.	"Smokin' Me Out" (featuring Ron Isley)	Griffin; Ronald Isley; Rudolph Isley; Ernest Isley; Marvin Isley; O'Kelly Isley; Chris Jasper	3:40
4.	"Reverend Eazy Dick"	Griffin	0:31
5.	"Reality"	Griffin; Sylvester Stewart	3:30
6.	"Interlude"	Griffin	0:16
7.	"Young Fun" (featuring Knee-Hi and Jayo Felony)	Griffin; Ericka Martin; James Savage	3:36
8.	"What We Go Through"	Griffin; Ricardo Brown; Delmar Arnaud; LaMorris Edwards; Jamarr Stamps	3:40
9.	"We Brings Heat"	Griffin; Martin; Jamali Carthorn; Deon Williams; Dewayne Williams; Danielle Hollis	3:46
10.	"Can You Feel It"	Griffin; Darren Robinson; Mark Morales; Danny Harris; Kurtis Walker; Damon Wimbley; David Ogrin	3:20
11.	"Transformers"	Griffin	3:01
12.	"Reel Tight" (Intro)	Griffin	0:20
13.	"Relax Ya Mind" (featuring Reel Tight)	Griffin; Billy Stewart	3:29
14.	"To All D.J.'s"	Griffin; Edwards; Ronald Larkins, Jr.; Larry Price; Stephen Hague; Malcolm McLaren; Trevor Horn	3:00
15.	"Back Up"	Narada Greenaway; P. Short	3:46
16.	"What's Love Got to Do with It" (featuring Adina Howard)	Terence Britten; Graham Lyle	4:15
17.	"I Shot the Sheriff"	Robert Nesta Marley	4:06
18.	"What's Love Got to Do with It" (Remix)	Britten; Lyle	3:53
Total length:			52:33

Sample credits

- Track 2 contains a sample of "Bitches Ain't Shit" written by Andre Young, Tracy Curry, Calvin Broadus, Ricardo Brown and Delmar Arnaud.
- Track 3 contains an interpolation of "Cooling Me Out" written by Ronald Isley, Rudolph Isley, Ernest Isley, Marvin Isley, O'Kelly Isley and Chris Jasper.
- Track 5 contains an interpolation of "If You Want Me to Stay" written by Sylvester Stewart.
- Track 10 contains an interpolation of "Can You Feel It?" written by Darren Robinson, Mark Morales, Danny Harris, Kurtis Walker, Damon Wimbley and Dave Ogrin.
- Track 13 contains an interpolation of "I Do Love You" written by Billy Stewart.
- Track 14 contains an interpolation of "Hey D.J." written by Ronald Larkins Jr., Larry Price, Stephen Hague and Malcolm McLaren and a sample from "She's Looking Like a Hobo" written by Malcolm McLaren and Trevor Horn.
- Track 17 contains a sample of "Love's Gonna Get Cha" written by Lawrence Parker and Antoinette Colandero.
- Track 18 contains an interpolation of "One Love" written by Jalil Hutchins and Lawrence Smith.

== Personnel ==
- Warren "Warren G" Griffin III – vocals, keyboards (track: 5, 9), vibraslap (track 17), producer, executive producer
- Nathaniel "Nate Dogg" Hale – additional vocals (track 2)
- Ronald Isley – additional vocals (track 3)
- Ricky Harris – additional vocals (tracks: 6, 9)
- Ericka "Knee-Hi" Martin – additional vocals (tracks: 7, 9)
- James "Jayo Felony" Savage – additional vocals (track 7)
- LaMorris "Mr. Malik" Edwards – additional vocals (track 8), rap vocals (track 14)
- Perfec – additional vocals (track 8)
- Jamarr "Bad Azz" Stamps – additional vocals (track 8)
- Deon Williams – additional vocals (track 9)
- Dewayne Williams – additional vocals (track 9)
- Jamali "Jah-Skillz" Carthorn – additional vocals (track 9)
- Danielle "Neb Luv" Hollis – additional vocals (track 9)
- Nancy Fletcher – background vocals (tracks: 10, 17)
- Reel Tight – additional vocals (tracks: 12, 13)
- Dorinda Roberts – additional vocals (track 14)
- Arnita Porter – additional vocals (track 14)
- K-9 – additional vocals (track 15)
- P-C – additional vocals (track 15)
- Adina Howard – additional vocals (track 16)
- Ricardo Rouse – guitar (tracks: 2, 3, 7, 10, 11, 13-15, 18), bass (tracks: 3, 7), keyboards (track 18)
- A.J. Luke – keyboards (tracks: 2, 5, 8-10, 14, 15, 17), guitar & bass (track 17)
- Del Atkins – guitar & bass (track 5)
- Sean "Barney" Thomas – keyboards (tracks: 11, 13, 18)
- Greg Geitzenauer – vocoder (track 11), keyboards (track 14), recording & mixing, re-mixing (track 18)
- Lance Pierre – recording & mixing (track 7)
- Kenny Ochoa – engineering assistant
- Charles Nasser – engineering assistant
- David Huron – engineering assistant
- Dave Hancock – engineering assistant
- Scott Gutierrez – engineering assistant
- Sergio Garcia – engineering assistant
- David Huron – engineering assistant
- Bernie Grundman – mastering
- Aaron Anderson – co-executive producer, production coordinator
- Brian "B+" Cross – photography
- Tina Davis – A&R

== Charts ==
Chart (1997)	Peak position
Australian Albums (ARIA)	22
Austrian Albums (Ö3 Austria)	23
Belgian Albums (Ultratop Flanders)	48
Belgian Albums (Ultratop Wallonia)	40
Canadian Albums (Billboard)	20
Dutch Albums (Album Top 100)	32
Finnish Albums (Suomen virallinen lista)	32
French Albums (SNEP)	14
German Albums (Offizielle Top 100)	8
Hungarian Albums (MAHASZ)	23
New Zealand Albums (RMNZ)	10
Scottish Albums (Official Charts)	54
Swedish Albums (Sverigetopplistan)	25
Swiss Albums (Schweizer Hitparade)	9
UK Albums (Official Charts)	20
UK R&B Albums (Official Charts)	3
US Billboard 200	11
US Top R&B/Hip-Hop Albums (Billboard)	4

== Certifications ==
Region	Certification	Certified units/sales
United Kingdom (BPI)	Silver	60,000^{‡}
United States (RIAA)	Gold	500,000^{^}
^{^} Shipments figures based on certification alone.^{‡} Sales+streaming figures based on certification alone.
