= Do You See =

1994 single by Warren G

Single by Warren G

from the album Regulate...G Funk Era
- B-side: "What's Next"
- Released: October 29, 1994
- Studio: Track Record, Inc. (North Hollywood, Los Angeles)
- Genre: G-funk
- Length: 3:59
- Label: Violator; RAL
- Songwriters: Warren Griffin; Ricardo Brown (uncredited)
- Producer: Warren G

Warren G singles chronology
"This D.J." (1994)	"Do You See" (1994)	"What's Love Got to Do with It" (1996)

Music video
- "Do You See" on YouTube

"Do You See" is a song by American hip hop artist Warren G. It was released in October 1994 by Violator and RAL as the third and final single from his debut album, Regulate...G Funk Era (1994). It found some success in the United States, reaching number 42 on the Billboard Hot 100. The song found more success in the United Kingdom, peaking at number 29 on the UK Singles Chart in March 1995.

== Composition ==
The song uses the samples from "Juicy Fruit" by Mtume for the main beat and "Mama Used to Say" by Junior for the background tune. The spoken introduction is by Gil Scott-Heron, from the version of his spoken word "Bicentennial Blues" found on his live album It's Your World.

== Critical reception ==
Pete Stanton from Smash Hits gave "Do You See" a top score of five out of five and named it Best New Single, writing, "Warren G's vocals have the ability to make butter melt at 50 yards. His debut album, Regulate... The G-Funk Era played at full blast could turn the whole of Sainsbury's cheese counter into mush. If you don't own said album, then remove the jelly from your head and put a brain in there. Best get a doctor to do that for you, though. This is the third single from that album, and quite frankly, it's amazing. A simple rap, a gentle rhythm... perfection. There is only one way to chill-out properly, and that's listening to this. Don't be a fool — enjoy!"

== Music video ==
The music video for "Do You See" was released in October 1994 and features a cameo by Dr. Dre.

== Track listing ==
A1. "Do You See" (clean LP version) – 3:57
A2. "Do You See" (instrumental) – 3:57
B1. "What's Next" (clean LP version) – 3:26
B2. "What's Next" (instrumental) – 3:26

== Charts ==
Chart (1994–1995)	Peak position
New Zealand (Recorded Music NZ)	49
Scottish Singles Sales (Official Charts)	56
UK Singles (Official Charts)	29
UK Dance (Official Charts)	26
UK Hip Hop/R&B (Official Charts)	4
US Billboard Hot 100	42
US Dance Singles Sales (Billboard)	28
US Hot R&B/Hip-Hop Songs (Billboard)	45
US Hot Rap Songs (Billboard)	11
US Rhythmic Airplay (Billboard)	33

== Release history ==
Region	Date	Format(s)	Label(s)	Ref.
United States	November 1, 1994	12-inch vinyl; cassette	Violator; Rush Associated Labels	
United Kingdom	March 13, 1995	12-inch vinyl; CD; cassette	Violator; Rush Associated Labels; Island	
