= What's Love Got to Do with It (Warren G song) =

1996 single by Warren G

Single by Warren G featuring Adina Howard

from the album Supercop (soundtrack) and Take a Look Over Your Shoulder
- Released: August 6, 1996
- Length: 4:17
- Label: Interscope
- Songwriters: Terry Britten; Graham Lyle; Warren Griffin
- Producer: Warren G

Warren G singles chronology
"Do You See" (1994)	"What's Love Got to Do with It" (1996)	"I Shot the Sheriff" (1997)

Adina Howard singles chronology
"It's All About You" (1995)	"What's Love Got to Do with It" (1996)	"(Freak) And U Know It" (1997)

Music video
- "What's Love Got to Do with It" on YouTube

"What's Love Got to Do with It" is a song recorded by American artists Warren G and Adina Howard for the Supercop soundtrack. The song both sampled and interpolated the chorus of Tina Turner's 1984 song of the same name, though Warren G replaced the original lyrics with his own. Released in August 1996, by Interscope Records, "What's Love Got to Do with It" became a hit, making it to number 32 on the US Billboard Hot 100, becoming Warren G's third top-40 single, as well as number five on the Billboard Hot Rap Singles chart. The single found greater success outside the US, peaking at number one in New Zealand, number two in Australia, Sweden, and the United Kingdom, and reaching the top 10 in an additional ten countries.

== Critical reception ==
British magazine Music Week gave "What's Love Got to Do with It" a score of four out of five in their review of the single.

== Music video ==
A music video was produced to promote the single, directed by Joseph Kahn. It features footage of Warren G and Adina Howard performing the song, with clips from the film Police Story 3: Super Cop. Jackie Chan also appears near the end of the video, dancing along with the artists.

== Track listing ==
- A-side
1. "What's Love Got to Do with It?" (album version) – 4:17
2. "What's Love Got to Do with It?" (clean radio version) – 4:17
- B-side
1. "What's Love Got to Do with It?" (a cappella) – 4:15
2. "What's Love Got to Do with It?" (instrumental) – 4:15

== Charts ==
=== Weekly charts ===
Chart (1996)	Peak position
Australia (ARIA)	2
Austria (Ö3 Austria Top 40)	5
Belgium (Ultratip Bubbling Under Flanders)	11
Belgium (Ultratop 50 Wallonia)	29
Denmark (IFPI)	5
Europe (Eurochart Hot 100)	2
Europe (European Dance Radio)	2
Finland (Suomen virallinen lista)	14
France (SNEP)	9
Germany (GfK)	3
Hungary (Mahasz)	9
Iceland (Íslenski Listinn Topp 40)	16
Ireland (IRMA)	7
Israel (Israeli Singles Chart)	10
Italy (Musica e dischi)	14
Netherlands (Dutch Top 40)	9
Netherlands (Single Top 100)	9
New Zealand (Recorded Music NZ)	1
Norway (VG-lista)	7
Scottish Singles Sales (Official Charts)	11
Sweden (Sverigetopplistan)	2
Sweden (Swedish Dance Chart)	1
Switzerland (Schweizer Hitparade)	6
UK Singles (Official Charts)	2
UK Dance (Official Charts)	5
UK Hip Hop/R&B (Official Charts)	1
UK Airplay (Music Week)	7
UK Pop Tip Club Chart (Music Week)	26
US Billboard Hot 100	32
US Hot R&B/Hip-Hop Songs (Billboard)	36
US Hot Rap Songs (Billboard)	5
US Rhythmic Airplay (Billboard)	27

=== Year-end charts ===
Chart (1996)	Position
Australia (ARIA)	9
Europe (Eurochart Hot 100)	63
France (SNEP)	86
Germany (Media Control)	45
Netherlands (Dutch Top 40)	96
New Zealand (RIANZ)	30
Sweden (Topplistan)	26
Sweden (Swedish Dance Chart)	7
UK Singles (OCC)	45

Chart (1997)	Position
Europe (Eurochart Hot 100)	82

== Certifications ==
Region	Certification	Certified units/sales
Australia (ARIA)	Platinum	70,000^{^}
Germany (BVMI)	Gold	250,000^{^}
New Zealand (RMNZ) Physical sales	Platinum	10,000^{*}
New Zealand (RMNZ) Digital sales + streaming	Gold	15,000^{‡}
Norway (IFPI Norway)	Gold	
United Kingdom (BPI)	Silver	200,000^{^}
^{*} Sales figures based on certification alone.^{^} Shipments figures based on certification alone.^{‡} Sales+streaming figures based on certification alone.

== Release history ==
Region	Date	Format(s)	Label(s)	Ref.
United States	August 6, 1996	Rhythmic contemporary radio	Interscope	
United Kingdom	November 11, 1996	12-inch vinyl; CD; cassette	Interscope; MCA	
