= The G Files =

Studio album by Warren G
- Released: September 29, 2009
- Recorded: 2008–2009
- Genre: West Coast hip hop
- Length: 49:36
- Labels: Koch Records; TTL Records
- Producer: Warren G

Warren G chronology
In the Mid-Nite Hour (2005)	The G Files (2009)	Regulate... G Funk Era, Part II (2015)

Singles from The G Files
- 1. "Ringtone" Released: June 8, 2008; 2. "Crush" Released: July 27, 2008

Professional ratings
Review scores
Source	Rating
The Smoking Section	3.5/5 stars
USA Today	2.5/4 stars

The G Files is the sixth studio album by American rapper and musician Warren G. The album features guest performances from fellow 213 members, Snoop Dogg and Nate Dogg, Raekwon, RBX, Mr. Lucc from Dubb Union, as well as Cassie Davis, Ray J, BJ, and Blink-182 drummer Travis Barker, among others.

The first single, titled "Ringtone", was released June 8, 2008. A second single, titled "Crush", featuring singer Ray J was released July 27, 2008. Warren G has also leaked the well-received "Mr. DJ"; he later admitted that it would not be included on the album because he had forgotten where he found the sample. Warren G also released another street single, titled "Gigolos Get Lonely 2", however, it did not make the album.

== Track listing ==
No.	Title	Length
1.	"Intro"	0:37
2.	"The West Is Back" (featuring Halla & Mr. Lucc)	3:19
3.	"True Star" (featuring BJ)	2:55
4.	"Let's Get High (420 Anthem)" (featuring Travis Barker & Black Nicc)	4:05
5.	"100 Miles and Runnin'" (featuring Raekwon & Nate Dogg)	3:23
6.	"Skate Skate" (featuring Halla)	3:18
7.	"Drinks Ain't Free"	3:32
8.	"Swagger Rich" (featuring Snoop Dogg & Cassie Davis)	3:30
9.	"Suicide*" (featuring RBX)	4:15
10.	"Masquerade" (featuring Halla & Mr. Lucc)	4:30
11.	"Hold On"	3:39
12.	"What's Wrong" (featuring Black Nicc & Halla)	3:51
13.	"Ringtone"	4:38
14.	"Crush" (featuring Ray J)	4:04

- Note: "Suicide" was featured in the 2003 video-game True Crime: Streets of LA under the name "What U Wanna Do", suggesting it was an unreleased track until The G Files.
