= I Want It All (Warren G song) =

Single by Warren G featuring Mack 10

from the album I Want It All
- Released: August 31, 1999
- Recorded: 1999
- Genre: Gangsta rap
- Length: 4:45
- Label: G-Funk; Restless
- Songwriters: Warren Griffin III; Dedrick Rolison; Eldra DeBarge; Etterlene Jordan; William DeBarge
- Producer: Warren G

Warren G singles chronology
"Nobody Does It Better" (1998)	"I Want It All" (1999)	"Game Don't Wait" (1999)

Mack 10 singles chronology
"Money's Just a Touch Away" (1998)	"I Want It All" (1999)	"You Can Do It" (1999)

Music video
- "I Want It All" on YouTube

"I Want It All" is a song performed by American rappers Warren G and Mack 10. It was released on August 31, 1999 through G-Funk/Restless Records as the lead single from Warren G's third studio album I Want It All. Produced by Warren G himself, who used a sample of DeBarge's "I Like It". An accompanying music video was directed by Paul Hunter.

In the United States, the song peaked at number 23 on both the Billboard Hot 100 and Rhythmic Airplay, number 11 on the Hot R&B/Hip-Hop Songs, number 36 on the R&B/Hip-Hop Airplay and atop the Hot Rap Songs charts. On October 5, 1999, the song received gold certification by the Recording Industry Association of America for selling 500,000 copies in the US alone.

A remix version of the song features Memphis Bleek, Drag-On and Tikki Diamond.

== Track listing ==
No.	Title	Length
1.	"I Want It All" (Radio Edit)
2.	"I Want It All" (Album Version)
3.	"I Want It All" (Instrumental)
4.	"I Want It All" (Clean A Cappella)

== Charts ==
Chart (1999)	Peak position
US Billboard Hot 100	23
US Hot R&B/Hip-Hop Songs (Billboard)	11
US R&B/Hip-Hop Airplay (Billboard)	36
US Hot Rap Songs (Billboard)	1
US Rhythmic Airplay (Billboard)	23

== Certifications ==
Region	Certification	Certified units/sales
United States (RIAA)	Gold	500,000^{^}
^{^} Shipments figures based on certification alone.
