= James Simone =

American patrol officer

Jim Simone
- Born: March 21, 1948 (age 78); Cleveland, Ohio
- Other name: Supercop
- Spouse: Lynne Dorothy Stachowiak-Simone
- Police career
- Department: Cleveland Division of Police
- Service years: 1973 - 2011
- Rank: Patrolman
- Badge no.: 387
- Awards: Cleveland Police Medal of Valor. Twice named "Officer of the Year"

James Simone, often referred to as "Supercop," is a retired patrol officer with the Cleveland Division of Police.

During his 38 years as a police officer, Simone was involved in several high-profile incidents. He shot 11 people in the line of duty, killing 5 of them. All of his deadly force incidents were investigated and ruled justifiable. He was shot twice, stabbed, and hit by several cars. Simone consistently led the department in arrests and citations issued. During his career, Simone made more than 10,000 arrests, including 4,000 DUI arrests. He also wrote in excess of 100,000 traffic citations.

Simone's police work garnered him national media attention, including profiles on America's Most Wanted, Good Morning America, Eye to Eye with Connie Chung and Top Cops. He earned hundreds of awards and commendations for heroism and duty, including the Medal of Valor from the Cleveland Division of Police. He was also named "Officer of the Year" twice—the only person to do so in the history of the department. Simone has won numerous awards from MADD for his high rate of DUI arrests.

In 1980, Simone arrived at a house fire before fire department personnel. Believing there were family members inside the house, he rushed inside. He succumbed to smoke inhalation before being dragged out by rescue personnel.

On November 16, 1983, Simone and two other officers, Brian Miller and John Thomas, were shot by Dennis Workman, an emotionally disturbed ex-convict, in a church basement. Simone was shot in the face at point blank range. While laying semi-conscious on the basement floor, Simone managed to return fire and fatally wound Workman, who had continued to fire his .38 caliber revolver at the downed officers.

In 2008, Simone, while off-duty, entered a bank to deposit a check. Realizing a robbery was in progress, he ordered the suspect, Robert Hackworth, to freeze. Hackworth, who had led the tellers to believe that he had a gun in his pocket, ran from the bank towards his getaway truck, which he had stolen earlier that day from an auto dealership. As Simone chased Hackworth, a passing driver offered him a ride in her jeep. The driver stopped her vehicle directly in front of Hackworth's truck. Simone, only a few feet from Hackworth, ordered him to put his hands up. Hackworth ignored his order and instead reached towards his pocket. Simone fired once, fatally striking Hackworth in the side. No gun was found in Hackworth's truck. Investigators theorized that Hackworth was reaching towards his pants pocket to remove a bundle of stolen money that contained a dye pack. They dye pack had exploded and was likely burning his skin.

In winter 2011, Simone jumped into the frigid Cuyahoga River to save a 26-year-old woman who had fallen through the ice and disappeared below the surface. For his actions, he earned his second "Officer of the Year" award.
