= Regulate... G Funk Era =

1994 studio album by Warren G

Studio album by Warren G
- Released: June 7, 1994
- Recorded: 1993–1994
- Studios: Track Record, Inc. (North Hollywood, Los Angeles); Saturn Sound (Burbank, California); Sound City (Van Nuys, Los Angeles); G-Child (Long Beach, California)
- Genres: West Coast hip-hop; gangsta rap; G-funk
- Length: 36:50
- Labels: Violator; RAL
- Producer: Warren G

Warren G chronology
Regulate... G Funk Era (1994)	Take a Look Over Your Shoulder (1997)

Singles from Regulate... G Funk Era
- 1. "Regulate" Released: April 23, 1994; 2. "This D.J." Released: July 5, 1994; 3. "Do You See" Released: October 29, 1994

Regulate... G Funk Era is the debut studio album by American rapper Warren G. It was released on June 7, 1994, by Violator and distributed by Rush Associated Labels, a division of Def Jam Recordings. The album's biggest hit was the single "Regulate", a gritty depiction of West Coast gang life which samples singer Michael McDonald's hit "I Keep Forgettin' (Every Time You're Near)" and featured Nate Dogg. The album also featured the top ten hit "This D.J." The song "Regulate" was also featured on the Above the Rim soundtrack, which was released on March 22, 1994. An altered version of the song "So Many Ways" appeared in the 1995 film Bad Boys.

Warren G received two Grammy nominations: "This D.J." was nominated for a 1995 Grammy Award for Best Rap Solo Performance, while "Regulate" was nominated for a 1995 Grammy for Best Rap Performance by a Duo or Group. The album was nominated for Best Rap Album at the 1995 Soul Train Music Awards.

== Critical reception ==
Professional ratings
Initial reviews (in 1994)
Review scores
Source	Rating
Chicago Tribune	3.5/4 stars
Entertainment Weekly	B+
Music Week	3/5 stars
NME	8/10
Q	4/5 stars
Rolling Stone	3/5 stars
Select	3/5 medals
Smash Hits	4/5 stars
USA Today	3/4 stars

Professional ratings
Retrospective reviews (after 1994)
Review scores
Source	Rating
AllMusic	4/5 stars
Christgau's Consumer Guide	B+
RapReviews	8/10

The album received generally positive reviews from critics. Spin highly recommended the album, concluding: "Truth be told, Warren G. wasn't cut out to be a hardass. He's a romantic, in love with soft sound." The New York Times opined that Regulate... G Funk Era "is the first gangster rap album with crossover appeal... The music is slow, smooth and soulful. The arrangements are complicated, and the melodies sweet." Critic Robert Christgau commented positively regarding the coolly menacing nature of the music.

== Commercial performance ==
The album debuted at No. 2 on the US Billboard Top 200 albums chart, selling 176,000 in its opening week. The album later went on the sell over three million copies in the US and has been certified triple platinum by the Recording Industry Association of America (RIAA).

== 2014 re-release ==
The album was re-released in 2014 to coincide with its 20th anniversary. It includes three additional mixes of "Regulate": the "Destructo & Wax Motif Remix", featuring Motif, the "Photek Remix" featuring Nate Dogg, and the "Jauz Remix", also featuring Nate Dogg.

== Track listing ==
- All songs produced by Warren G

No.	Title	Writer(s)	Length
1.	"Regulate" (featuring Nate Dogg)	Warren Griffin; Nathaniel Hale; Michael McDonald; Ed Sanford; Jerry Leiber; Mike Stoller	4:08
2.	"Do You See"	W. Griffin; R. Brown	3:59
3.	"Gangsta Sermon" (featuring B-Tip and Ricky Harris)	W. Griffin; R. Harris	0:36
4.	"Recognize" (featuring the Twinz)	W. Griffin; D. Williams; D. Williams	2:59
5.	"Super Soul Sis" (featuring Jah Skills)	W. Griffin	2:56
6.	"'94 Ho Draft" (featuring B-Tip and Ricky Harris)	W. Griffin; R. Harris	1:00
7.	"So Many Ways"	W. Griffin; D. Williams	3:24
8.	"This D.J."	W. Griffin; C. Broadus	3:23
9.	"This Is the Shack" (featuring the Dove Shack)	W. Griffin; M. Makonie; A. Blunt; G. Brown	4:05
10.	"What's Next" (featuring Lil Malik)	W. Griffin; M. Edwards	3:26
11.	"And Ya Don't Stop"	W. Griffin	3:22
12.	"Runnin' wit No Breaks" (featuring Jah Skills, Bo Roc, G Child and the Twinz)	W. Griffin	3:32
Total length:			36:50

*Special Bonus Tracks (Bonus CD in Special Version of 2007)
No.	Title	Length
1.	"Regulate (Remix)" (featuring Nate Dogg)	4:19
2.	"Do You See (Stepz Remix)"	5:15
3.	"Do You See (Old Skool Mix)"	5:17
4.	"This D.J. (Remix)" (featuring O.G.L.B.)	3:46
5.	"This D.J. (Dobie's Rub Part 1)" (featuring O.G.L.B.)	4:02
6.	"What's Next (Instrumental)"	3:29

*Re-Release Bonus Tracks (2014)
No.	Title	Length
1.	"Regulate (Destructo & Wax Motif Remix)" (featuring Motif)	4:56
2.	"Regulate (Photek Remix)" (featuring Nate Dogg)	3:54
3.	"Regulate (Jauz Remix)" (featuring Nate Dogg)	5:40

== Personnel ==
- Warren G – vocals, background vocals, producer
- Chris Lighty, Paul Stewart – executive producer
- John Philip Shenale – editing
- John Morris – assistant engineer, mixing, mixing assistant
- Greg Geitzenauer – keyboards, mixing, engineer
- Mike Ainsworth – assistant engineer
- Ulysses Noriega – assistant engineer
- George "Yorrgi" Gallegos – assistant engineer
- Christopher C. Murphy – assistant engineer/runner
- Tony Green, Daniel Shulman – bass
- Che Laird, Andreas Straub, Morris O'Connor – guitar
- Sean "Barney" Thomas – keyboards
- Carl "Butch" Small – percussion
- Nate Dogg, Ricky Harris, B-Tip, Deon, Dewayne, Lady Levi, Jah-Skilz – vocals
- The Dove Shack – vocals, background vocals
- O.G.L.B. – background vocals
- Bernie Grundman – mastering
- Michael Miller – photography

== Samples ==
"Regulate"

- "I Keep Forgettin' (Every Time You're Near)" by Michael McDonald
- "Sign of the Times" by Bob James
- "Let Me Ride" by Dr. Dre

"Do You See"

- "Bicentennial Blues" by Gil Scott-Heron
- "Juicy Fruit" by Mtume
- "Mama Used to Say" by Junior

"Super Soul Sis"

- "Don't Stop (Ever Loving Me)" by One Way
- "Why Have I Lost You" by Cameo
- "Nuthin' but a 'G' Thang (Freestyle Remix)" by Snoop Dogg

"94 Ho Draft"

- "Groove to Get Down" by T-Connection

"This Is The Shack"

- "Ode to Billie Joe" by Lou Donaldson
- "Pass the Dutchie" by Musical Youth

"This D.J."

- "Curious" by Midnight Star
- "Juicy Fruit" by Mtume
- "Paid in Full" by Eric B. & Rakim

"And Ya Don't Stop"

- "Janitzio" by Don Julian

"Runnin' wit No Breaks"

- "Go On and Cry" by Les McCann and Eddie Harris
- "N.T." by Kool & the Gang
- "Tha Next Episode (Unreleased)" by Snoop Doggy Dogg and Dr. Dre

"So Many Ways"

- "Take Your Time (Do It Right)" by the S.O.S. Band

"What's Next"

- "Adventures of Super Rhyme (Rap)" by Jimmy Spicer
- "Mind Blowing Decisions" by Heatwave
- "Conjunction Junction" by Bob Dorough, featuring Jack Sheldon and Terri Morel

"Recognize"

- "Doggy Dogg World" by Snoop Dogg, featuring Kurupt, Daz Dillinger, and the Dramatics
- "Genius Is Back" by Mix Master Spade and Compton Posse

== Charts ==
=== Weekly charts ===
Chart (1994)	Peak position
Australian Albums (ARIA)	42
Canada Top Albums/CDs (RPM)	27
Dutch Albums (Album Top 100)	19
German Albums (Offizielle Top 100)	15
New Zealand Albums (RMNZ)	26
Scottish Albums (Official Charts)	59
Swedish Albums (Sverigetopplistan)	12
UK Albums (Official Charts)	25
UK R&B Albums (Official Charts)	9
US Billboard 200	2
US Top R&B/Hip-Hop Albums (Billboard)	1

=== Year-end charts ===
Chart (1994)	Position
German Albums (Offizielle Top 100)	73
US Billboard 200	32
US Top R&B/Hip-Hop Albums (Billboard)	9

Singles – Billboard (North America)

Year	Single	Chart	Position
1994	"Do You See"	Billboard Hot 100	42
1994	"Regulate"	Billboard Hot 100	2
1994	"This D.J."	Billboard Hot 100	9

== Certifications ==
Region	Certification	Certified units/sales
Canada (Music Canada)	Gold	50,000^{^}
France (SNEP)	Gold	100,000^{*}
United Kingdom (BPI)	Silver	60,000^{^}
United States (RIAA)	3× Platinum	3,000,000^{^}
^{*} Sales figures based on certification alone.^{^} Shipments figures based on certification alone.

== See also ==
- List of number-one R&B albums of 1994 (U.S.)
