= The Return of the Regulator =

Studio album by Warren G
- Released: December 11, 2001
- Recorded: 2000–2001
- Studios: Track Records; G-Factory; Record One Studios (Los Angeles, California)
- Genres: West Coast hip-hop; g-funk
- Length: 1:00:15
- Labels: G-Funk; Universal
- Producers: Dr. Dre; Soopafly; Warren G

Warren G chronology
I Want It All (1999)	The Return of the Regulator (2001)	The Hard Way (2004)

Singles from The Return of the Regulator
- 1. "Lookin' at You" Released: October 30, 2001; 2. "Ghetto Village" Released: March 26, 2002

Professional ratings
Review scores
Source	Rating
AllMusic	3/5 stars
HipHopDX	4/5
Los Angeles Times	2/4 stars
Q	3/5 stars
RapReviews	6.5/10
The Source	3.5/5 stars
USA Today	2/4 stars

The Return of the Regulator is the fourth studio album by American rapper Warren G. It was released on December 11, 2001 via Universal Records. Production was handled by Warren G himself, except for two songs produced by Dr. Dre and Soopafly. It features guest appearances from Mista Grimm, Butch Cassidy, CPO Boss Hogg, Damone, El DeBarge, George Clinton, Kokane, Lady Mo, LaToiya Williams, Soopafly, WC, and fellow 213 members Nate Dogg and Snoop Dogg.

The album peaked at number 83 on the Billboard 200 and number 14 on the Top R&B/Hip-Hop Albums charts in the United States and number 87 in France. Its lead single, "Lookin' at You", made it to number 45 in France, number 60 on the Official Singles Chart and number 13 on the Official Hip Hop and R&B Singles Chart in the UK, and number 72 on the Hot R&B/Hip-Hop Songs in the US.

== Track listing ==
No.	Title	Writer(s)	Producer(s)	Length
1.	"Intro"	Warren Griffin III; Damone Coleman	Warren G	3:34
2.	"Lookin' at You" (featuring Toi)	Griffin III; LaToiya Williams; Andre Young; Mike Elizondo; Camara Kambon; Darawn Collins; Priest Brooks	Dr. Dre	4:13
3.	"Here Comes Another Hit" (featuring Nate Dogg and Mista Grimm)	Griffin III; Nathaniel Hale; Rojai Trawick; Collins; Rudy Ray Moore	Warren G	3:33
4.	"Somethin' to Bounce To" (featuring Soopafly)	Griffin III; Brooks	Soopafly	3:24
5.	"This Gangsta Shit Is Too Much" (featuring Butch Cassidy)	Griffin III; Collins	Warren G	3:45
6.	"Pump Up" (Skit)	Griffin III	Warren G	1:47
7.	"Young Locs Slow Down" (featuring W.C. and Butch Cassidy)	Griffin III; William Calhoun; Danny Means	Warren G	4:22
8.	"Speed Dreamin'" (featuring George Clinton and Mista Grimm)	Griffin III; George Clinton; Trawick; Collins	Warren G	5:03
9.	"Yo' Sassy Ways" (performed by 213)	Griffin III; Calvin Broadus; Hale	Warren G	3:58
10.	"Deez Nuts Part II" (Skit)	Griffin III	Warren G	0:59
11.	"It Ain't Nothin' Wrong With You" (featuring Mista Grimm, Boss Hogg and Damone)	Griffin III; Trawick; Vincent Edwards; Coleman	Warren G	3:48
12.	"Ghetto Village"	Griffin III; E. White; Stevie Wonder	Warren G	3:54
13.	"They Lovin' Me Now" (featuring Butch Cassidy and Boss Hogg)	Griffin III; Means; Edwards; Collins	Warren G	4:08
14.	"Streets of LBC" (featuring Lady Mo)	Griffin III; White; Joseph Salter; Douglas Wood	Warren G	4:10
15.	"G-Funk Is Here 2 Stay" (featuring Mista Grimm and Kokane)	Griffin III; Trawick; Jerry Long; Collins	Warren G	4:32
16.	"Keepin' It Strong" (featuring El DeBarge)	Griffin III; Eldra DeBarge; Royal Harbor	Warren G	5:05
Total length:				1:00:15

Bonus Track
No.	Title	Producer(s)	Length
17.	"Getaway" (featuring Mista Grimm)	Warren G	4:38

Sample credits

- Track 3 contains excerpts from "Dolemite" written and performed by Rudy Ray Moore.
- Track 12 contains excerpts from the composition "Village Ghetto Land (Songs in the Key of Life)" written by Stevie Wonder.
- Track 14 contains interpolations from the composition "New York, New York" written by Joseph Salter and Douglas Wood.

== Personnel ==
- Warren "Warren G" Griffin III – vocals, drums, producer, executive producer
- Damone Coleman – vocals
- LaToiya Williams – vocals
- Rojai "Mista Grimm" Trawick – vocals
- Nathaniel "Nate Dogg" Hale – vocals
- Priest "Soopafly" Brooks – vocals, producer
- Danny "Butch Cassidy" Means – vocals
- William "WC" Calhoun – vocals
- George Clinton – vocals
- Calvin "Snoop Dogg" Broadus – vocals
- Vincent "CPO Boss Hogg" Edwards – vocals
- Lady Mo – vocals
- Jerry "Kokane" Long – vocals
- Eldra Patrick "El" DeBarge – vocals
- Traci "TrayBlack" Brown-Bailey – backing vocals
- Val Young – backing vocals
- Craig Brockman – keyboards
- Camara Kambon – keyboards
- Scott Storch – additional keyboards
- Theron Feemster – additional keyboards
- Marlon Williams – guitar
- Mike Elizondo – guitar
- Andrew Gouche – bass
- Andre "Dr. Dre" Young – producer, mixing
- Booker T. Jones III – recording, engineering
- Charles Nasser – recording, engineering, mixing
- Mauricio "Veto" Iragorri – tracking, engineering
- Rich Travali – mixing
- Zach Will – Pro Tools engineering
- Jamie Duncan – mixing assistant
- Rich Johnson – mixing assistant
- Darrell Thorp – engineering assistant
- John Tyree – engineering assistant
- Rouble Kapoor – engineering assistant
- Tom Sweeney – engineering assistant
- Brian Gardner – mastering
- Kevin Law – executive producer, A&R direction
- Derek "LA" Jackson – executive producer, management
- Cey Adams – art direction, design
- Tonya Blackstone – art direction, design
- Jonathan Mannion – photography
- Chrystal Chambers – A&R administrator
- Jennifer Havey – A&R coordinator

== Charts ==
Chart (2001)	Peak position
French Albums (SNEP)	87
US Billboard 200	83
US Top R&B/Hip-Hop Albums (Billboard)	14
