= Regulate (song) =

1994 single by Warren G and Nate Dogg

Single by Warren G and Nate Dogg

from the album Regulate... G Funk Era and Above the Rim (soundtrack)
- B-side: "Pain"; "Mi Monie Rite"; "Loyal to the Game"
- Released: April 1994
- Genre: West Coast hip-hop; gangsta rap; G-funk
- Length: 4:11
- Label: Death Row; Interscope; Violator; Def Jam
- Songwriters: Warren Griffin III; Nathaniel Hale; Michael McDonald; Ed Sanford; Jerry Leiber; Mike Stoller; John Fusco
- Producer: Warren G

Warren G singles chronology
"Indo Smoke" (1993)	"Regulate" (1994)	"This D.J." (1994)

Nate Dogg singles chronology
"Indo Smoke" (1993)	"Regulate" (1994)	"One More Day" (1994)

Music video
- "Regulate" on YouTube

"Regulate" is a song performed by American rappers Warren G and Nate Dogg. It was released in April 1994 as the first single from the soundtrack to the film Above the Rim and later Warren G's debut album, Regulate... G Funk Era (1994). It became an MTV staple and the song reached No. 2 on the US Billboard Hot 100 and No. 8 on the R&B/Hip-Hop chart. "Regulate" was number 98 on VH1's 100 Greatest Songs of Hip Hop and number 108 on Pitchfork Media's "Top 200 Tracks of the 90s".

The West Coast hip-hop track employs a four-bar sample of the rhythm of Michael McDonald's song "I Keep Forgettin' (Every Time You're Near)". It also samples "Sign of the Times" by Bob James and interpolates "Let Me Ride" by Dr. Dre. The music video featured scenes from Above the Rim, including a cameo by Tupac Shakur. "Regulate" starts with dialogue spoken by Casey Siemaszko performing as the character Charlie Bowdre from the 1988 film Young Guns:

We regulate any stealing of his property – we're damn good too! ...But you can't be any geek off the street, gotta be handy with the steel, if you know what I mean, earn your keep.

== Background ==
Warren had bought a stack of vinyl records for $250 from a poor man he felt bad for outside of a Roscoe's in Hollywood. Among them was Michael McDonald's "I Keep Forgettin'", a song he recalled from his stepmother and father's gatherings in North Long Beach. Warren decided to sample a four bar loop from the track for "Regulate".

At the time, Warren was living in a dingy apartment which had no furniture and dog feces on the floor. It was located by Long Beach Boulevard and San Antonio Drive in North Long Beach. His setup included recording equipment in the bedroom and a vocal booth in the bathroom and closet. His gear consisted of a Numark mixer, Technics 1200 turntables and an Akai MPC 60.

While watching Young Guns, Warren was inspired by the line "Regulators: We regulate any stealing of this property, and we're damn good, too". He resonated with the term "regulate" which he and his crew frequently used. Together with his engineer, Greg Geitzenauer, Warren rented the film on VHS and recorded the sample using ADAT, a brand new S-VHS-based digital recording technology at the time, allowing them to affordably record the sample. Warren used his label advance to purchase a multi-track home studio rig. Geitzenauer went to Guitar Center to get a console, microphone preamps, speaker monitors, the ADATs, and cabling and set up all the gear in the apartment. The ADAT and VCR was then plugged with quarter-inch to RCA adapters into the MPC 60 sequencer to sample the line.

Warren also whistled a riff from Bob James' 1981 funk-jazz fusion album Sign of the Times. Geitzenauer added keyboards with a string sound derived from a Yamaha SY77; the riff was in the style of a Hammond organ at the end of every fourth bar. A Minimoog-type sound was used during the Young Guns dialogue, this was one of the last parts added to the song.

Before this session, Warren had been producing beats and saving them. When Nate Dogg was invited over to visit the apartment, he immediately liked the instrumental for "Regulate". They began writing and recording the song together in the same session, inspired by the duet style of Snoop Dogg and Dr. Dre's "Nuthin' but a 'G' Thang", and Run-DMC. They decided the song only needed verses and no chorus. The lyrics were semi-autobiographical, but the lyrics related to the dice game incident happened to a friend of theirs they witnessed on 61st Street.

In an NME interview, Warren G explained: "That record was things that I went through, and friends of ours went through. We'd witnessed that and we'd been a part of it. We just told the story, and then on the hook we just let everybody's imagination flow."

Geitzenauer re-recorded the song's vocals at Track Studio in North Hollywood, noting that the track's lack of a hook was unusual with only the intro having the main riff. A radio-friendly version was also recorded, as Chris Lighty from Def Jam requested a cleaner version as the original would have had too many explicit words censored. The radio version became the main album version, while the original explicit version was never released.

The final version of "Regulate" was initially shopped around before being added to the Above the Rim soundtrack. A&R Mike Lynn, a long time associate of Dr. Dre, was shown a cassette of the track in Warren's 1985 Buick Regal. Lynn and played it for Dre, and the cassette eventually reached Jimmy Iovine, who pushed for "Regulate" as the single. Despite a label dispute—Nate was signed to Death Row Records and Warren to Def Jam—clearance was granted to Suge Knight and Death Row and the single was released. Lyor Cohen and Def Jam eventually re-released the single.

During the music video shoot, Warren missed most of it due to an incident where he drove off from a gas station with the gas pump hose still attached. He was pulled over by police leading to an arrest for outstanding warrants. He was then released from jail the same evening.

== Synopsis ==
Warren G is driving alone through Eastside, Long Beach, California at night, looking for women. He finds a group of men playing dice and tries to join them, but they pull out their guns and rob him instead. Thinking he's about to die, Warren G sings out, "if I had wings I would fly"; one critic describes this moment as "the hook" of the song. Meanwhile, Nate Dogg is looking for Warren G. He passes a car full of women, who are so fixated on him that they crash their car. He finds Warren G and shoots at the robbers, apparently killing them. The two friends then return to the women and ride away with them, with the intent of taking them to the "Eastside motel". In the third verse, Warren and Nate explain their G-funk musical style; the song "constructs itself as inaugurating a new era".

== Critical reception ==
Bill Speed and John Martinucci from the Gavin Report noted that here, the hip hop artists "tap blue-eyed soulman Michael McDonald's 'I Keep Forgettin'' for the music bed and the familiar groove fuels the duo's narrative raps as they 'Regulate'." Pan-European magazine Music & Media commented, "Sung in a Bill Withers meets pioneer rapper Kurtis Blow timbre, there's something lovely old-fashioned about this soul number off the Above the Rim soundtrack." Music & Media editor Maria Jimenez named it a "laidback lyric-flowing hip hop jam". Alan Jones from Music Week described it as a "mellow" song/rap sung over a sample of the 1986 remake. He added, "Sterling support from 2 Pac, Lord G and Treach/Riddler make this an excellent single." Dele Fadele from NME felt that "Dr Dre and his brother hitch a sad, ominous keyboard refrain onto the smooth, laid-back song and suggest there's more to the situation than meets the eye."

James Hamilton from the Record Mirror Dance Update named it a "lovely languid 0-95.3bpm US smash gangsta rap with catchy whistling" in his weekly dance column. Gareth Grundy from Select wrote that songs like 'Regulate' "are smooth jeep beats that even a fully paid-up Klan member would struggle to resist." Charles Aaron from Spin commented, "Funny (or maybe not) how pop's young soul rebels sound more comfortably sincere when they're romancing their gats than when they're sweet-talking their ladies. Guess you gotta start somewhere. Anyway, as a rapper, Warren G's a regular-joe version of childhood bud Snoop Dogg; as a producer, his gangsta fantasyland is even more slickly diminished than big brother Dr. Dre. Imagine a stripped Mothership up on blocks with a fresh paint job."

== Impact and analysis ==
"Regulate" became Def Jam's biggest single. During much of the summer of 1994, the video stayed number one on the MTV charts. In the video as played on MTV, some of the lyrics are censored with the word "cold" being blanked from the line "Nate Dogg is about to make some bodies turn cold"; an action that Spin equated with racism because more explicit songs by white artists like Johnny Cash were not being censored. The video contained "everyday footage" from the film Above the Rim, as well as new footage, although guest vocalist Nate Dogg did not appear due to conflict between Suge Knight and Def Jam.

The lyrics have been described as "a surreal pastiche of half-sung lyrics about fighting and fucking". Craig Marks recommended "Regulate" for its "lite rock synth lines and rippling bass" but thought that Warren G's rapping abilities were "average". The mockumentary series Yacht Rock featured "Regulate" in its episode No. 7, where Michael McDonald and Kenny Loggins make a bet about the popularity of the song, "I Keep Forgettin' (Every Time You're Near)". Ten years later, the Long Beach-based rappers accidentally hit McDonald with their car and take him back to their house, where they sample McDonald's smooth keyboard groove.

== Awards and nominations ==
1995 International Dance Awards

- Tune of the Year – "Regulate" by Warren G and Nate Dogg (nominated)

1995 MTV Movie Awards

- Best Movie Song – "Regulate" by Warren G and Nate Dogg (nominated)

1995 Grammy Awards

- Best Rap Performance by a Duo or Group - "Regulate" by Warren G and Nate Dogg (nominated)

== Track listing ==
"Regulate" was released as a maxi single by Interscope, catalog number 6544-95917-0 (12-inch vinyl) and 6544-95917-2 (CD), along with three other tracks.

1. "Regulate" - Warren G (feat. Nate Dogg)
2. "Pain" - 2Pac (feat. Stretch)
3. "Mi Monie Rite" - Lord G
4. "Loyal to the Game" - 2Pac (feat. Treach, Riddler)

== Charts ==
=== Weekly charts ===
Chart (1994)	Peak position
Australia (ARIA)	16
Austria (Ö3 Austria Top 40)	19
Belgium (Ultratop 50 Flanders)	10
Denmark (IFPI)	10
Europe (Eurochart Hot 100)	7
Europe (European AC Radio)	13
Europe (European Dance Radio)	9
Europe (European Hit Radio)	12
Finland (Suomen virallinen lista)	13
France (SNEP)	7
Germany (GfK)	7
Iceland (Íslenski Listinn Topp 40)	6
Ireland (IRMA)	5
Netherlands (Dutch Top 40)	7
Netherlands (Single Top 100)	5
New Zealand (Recorded Music NZ)	5
Norway (VG-lista)	4
Scottish Singles Sales (Official Charts)	10
Sweden (Sverigetopplistan)	4
Switzerland (Schweizer Hitparade)	5
UK Singles (Official Charts)	5
UK Dance (Official Charts)	2
UK Hip Hop/R&B (Official Charts)	11
UK Airplay (Music Week)	13
UK Dance (Music Week)	2
UK Club Chart (Music Week)	48
US Billboard Hot 100	2
US Hot R&B/Hip-Hop Songs (Billboard)	7
US Hot Rap Songs (Billboard)	1
US Pop Airplay (Billboard)	32
US Rhythmic Airplay (Billboard)	3

=== Year-end charts ===
Chart (1994)	Position
Australia (ARIA)	47
Belgium (Ultratop)	91
Europe (Eurochart Hot 100)	38
Germany (Media Control)	37
Iceland (Íslenski Listinn Topp 40)	44
Netherlands (Dutch Top 40)	71
Netherlands (Single Top 100)	69
New Zealand (RIANZ)	16
Sweden (Topplistan)	26
Switzerland (Schweizer Hitparade)	31
UK Singles (OCC)	35
UK Airplay (Music Week)	36
US Billboard Hot 100	22

Chart (1995)	Position
France (SNEP)	60

== Certifications ==
Region	Certification	Certified units/sales
Australia (ARIA)	Gold	35,000^{^}
Denmark (IFPI Danmark)	Gold	45,000^{‡}
Germany (BVMI)	Gold	250,000^{^}
New Zealand (RMNZ)	5× Platinum	150,000^{‡}
United Kingdom (BPI)	2× Platinum	1,200,000^{‡}
United States (RIAA)	2× Platinum	2,000,000^{‡}
^{^} Shipments figures based on certification alone.^{‡} Sales+streaming figures based on certification alone.

== Remixes and covers ==
- The song was covered live by Umphrey's McGee as early as 2007.
