= In the Mid-Nite Hour =

Studio album by Warren G
- Released: October 11, 2005
- Recorded: 2004–2005
- Genre: Hip-hop
- Length: 61:48
- Label: Hawino Records
- Producers: Warren G; Terrace Martin; Raphael Saadiq; Marlon Williams

Warren G chronology
The Hard Way (2004)	In the Mid-Nite Hour (2005)	The G Files (2009)

In the Mid-Nite Hour is the fifth studio album by Warren G, released on the label Hawino Records on October 11, 2005. His first single was "Get U Down" featuring Ice Cube, B-Real, and Snoop Dogg, and his follow up single was "I Need A Light" featuring Nate Dogg. Neither single was able to make the Billboard charts for music and the album peaked at number 80 on the Billboard 200 album chart selling 14,800 in its first week. It is notable for having a laid back feel to it and featuring rapper Bishop Lamont on seven tracks. The album was released in the UK on March 25, 2006.

== Critical reception ==
Professional ratings
Review scores
Source	Rating
AllMusic	3.5/5 stars
RapReviews	(7.5/10)
Vibe	2.5/5 stars

Steve 'Flash' Juon of RapReviews praised Warren's musicianship for crafting well-produced tracks with a strong featured cast while maintaining his smooth flow, saying that "In the Mid-Nite Hour may not raise him to prominence, but it won't disappoint his audience or the casual purchaser who wants some nice shit to cruise to." Jason Birchmeier of AllMusic praised the independent approach to the album and found it more approachable than Warren's previous effort The Return of the Regulator. Jozen Cummings of Vibe commended Warren for attempting to recapture his early work but found it too brief and often backfiring on itself, concluding that "it's no secret that his G-funk prime has passed."

== Track listing ==
No.	Title	Length
1.	"Shhhhh"	0:04
2.	"On My Mind (11:59 p.m.)" (featuring Chevy Jones, Bishop Lamont, Mike Anthony and Bokey)	3:43
3.	"Make It Do What It Do" (featuring Bishop Lamont)	3:52
4.	"In Case Some Shit Go Down" (featuring Mike Jones and Frank Lee White)	3:29
5.	"I Need a Light" (featuring Nate Dogg)	4:42
6.	"Get U Down" (featuring B-Real and Side Effect)	3:48
7.	"A Chronic Break"	0:21
8.	"Weed Song" (featuring Frank Lee White)	1:58
9.	"Wheels Keep Spinning"	4:01
10.	"PYT" (featuring Snoop Dogg and Nate Dogg)	4:05
11.	"Walk These Streets" (featuring Raphael Saadiq)	3:49
12.	"Garilla Pimpin" (featuring Bishop Lamont)	4:11
13.	"Turn It Up Loud" (featuring Chuck Taylor)	3:40
14.	"In the Mid-Nite Hour" (featuring Nate Dogg)	3:44
15.	"I Like That There" (featuring Bishop Lamont)	4:00
16.	"Yes Sir" (featuring Snoop Dogg, Bishop Lamont and Frank Lee White)	3:59
17.	"Ahh" (featuring Bishop Lamont, Frank Lee White and Chuck Taylor)	4:43
18.	"All I Ask of You" (featuring Frank Lee White, Bishop Lamont and Chevy Jones)	3:39

Bonus track
No.	Title	Length
1.	"Get U Down (Remix)" (featuring B-Real, Side Effect, Snoop Dogg and Ice Cube)	5:02
