= Supercop (soundtrack) =

Soundtrack album by various artists
- Released: July 30, 1996
- Recorded: 1996
- Genre: Alternative rock; hip hop
- Label: Interscope
- Producer: Ray Santamaria (exec.); Devo; Mark Walk; 2Pac; Danny Saber; Daz Dillinger; Dimebag Darrell; Ed Ackerson; Goat; Joel McNeely; John Reis; No Doubt; Phil Nicolo; Roger Greenawalt; Scott Crane; Sterling Winfield; Warren G

Singles from Supercop
- 1. "What's Love Got to Do With It" Released: August 17, 1996

Professional ratings
Review scores
Source	Rating
AllMusic	4/5 stars

Supercop is the soundtrack to the US version of the 1992 Hong Kong action film Supercop. It was released on July 30, 1996 via Interscope Records and consists of various types of music including alternative rock and hip hop. The soundtrack was not much of a success, only making it to #133 on the Billboard 200, but Warren G and Adina Howard's version of "What's Love Got to Do With It" made it #32 on the Billboard Hot 100 and #5 on the Hot Rap Songs. 2Pac's song with the Outlawz on this soundtrack would reappear as the only single to the Gang Related – The Soundtrack after his death following Supercop's release.

== Track listing ==
No.	Title	Writer(s)	Producer(s)	Length
1.	"Kung Fu Fighting" (performed by Tom Jones featuring Ruby)	C. Douglas	Mark Walk; Scott Crane	2:36
2.	"What's Love Got to Do With It" (performed by Warren G featuring Adina Howard)	G. Lyle; T. Britten	Warren G	4:18
3.	"Harry the Dog" (performed by Black Grape)	P. Leveridge; S. Ryder; D. Saber	Danny Saber	4:09
4.	"Head Like a Hole" (performed by Devo)	M. Reznor	Devo	4:53
5.	"Made Niggaz" (performed by 2Pac featuring Outlawz)	T. Shakur; Outlawz	2Pac; Johnny "J" (co.)	5:04
6.	"Caged in a Rage" (performed by Dimebag Darrell)	D. Abbott	Dimebag Darrell; Sterling Winfield	3:24
7.	"On a Rope" (performed by Rocket from the Crypt)	J. Reis	John Reis	2:53
8.	"Stayin' Alive" (performed by Siobhan Lynch)	B. Gibb; M. Gibb; R. Gibb	Mark Walk	4:37
9.	"I'll Do It" (performed by Tha Dogg Pound featuring Kausion)	D. Arnaud; F. Moore; R. Brown; M. Meador; R. Moore	Dat Nigga Daz	5:16
10.	"Great Life" (performed by Goatboy)	A. Rosen	Goatboy; Roger Greenawalt	2:56
11.	"Open the Gate" (performed by No Doubt)	G. Stefani; E. Stefani; T. Dumont; T. Kanal; A. Young	No Doubt	3:40
12.	"Pubstar" (performed by Pur)	K. Giunta; T. Hannigan	Phil Nicolo; Ian Cross (co.); Pur (co.)	3:46
13.	"Scorched Youth Policy" (performed by Polara)	E. Ackerson	Ed Ackerson	1:54
14.	"Supercop" (performed by Devo)	G. Pizzute; M. Mothersbaugh	Devo	4:15
15.	"Main Title from Supercop" (performed by Joel McNeely)	J. McNeely	Joel McNeely	1:44

== Charts ==
Chart (1996)	Peak position
US Billboard 200	133
