= Smokin' Me Out =

1997 single by Warren G featuring Ron Isley

Single by Warren G featuring Ron Isley

from the album Take a Look Over Your Shoulder
- B-side: "We Brings Heat"
- Released: May 13, 1997
- Length: 3:40
- Label: Def Jam; Rush Associated Labels
- Songwriters: The Isley Brothers; Warren Griffin
- Producer: Warren G

Warren G singles chronology
"I Shot the Sheriff" (1997)	"Smokin' Me Out" (1997)	"Prince Igor" (1997)

Ron Isley singles chronology
"Come with Me" (1996)	"Smokin' Me Out" (1997)	"Friend of Mine" (remix) (1998)

Music video
- "Smokin' Me Out" on YouTube

"Smokin' Me Out" is the third and final single released from American rapper Warren G's second album, Take a Look Over Your Shoulder. The song features Ron Isley on the chorus and samples the Isley Brothers' song "Coolin' Me Out", for which all of the brothers were given writing credits. "Smokin' Me Out" was Warren G's fifth US top-40 single, peaking at 35 on the Billboard Hot 100. The song was also a hit in the United Kingdom, where it peaked at number 14, and in New Zealand, where it reached number three.

== Track listing ==
A1. "Smokin' Me Out" (radio)
A2. "Smokin' Me Out" (LP version)
A3. "Smokin' Me Out" (instrumental)
B1. "We Brings Heat" (radio)
B2. "We Brings Heat" (instrumental)
B3. "Smokin' Me Out" (acappella)

== Charts ==
=== Weekly charts ===
Chart (1997)	Peak position
Europe (Eurochart Hot 100)	53
France (SNEP)	21
New Zealand (Recorded Music NZ)	3
Scotland Singles (OCC)	29
UK Singles (OCC)	14
UK Dance (OCC)	20
UK Hip Hop/R&B (OCC)	3
US Billboard Hot 100	35
US Hot R&B/Hip-Hop Songs (Billboard)	20
US Hot Rap Songs (Billboard)	4

=== Year-end charts ===
Chart (1997)	Position
New Zealand (RIANZ)	34
US Hot Rap Singles (Billboard)	36

== Certifications ==
Certification for "Smokin' Me Out"
Region	Certification	Certified units/sales
New Zealand (RMNZ)	Gold	15,000^{‡}
^{‡} Sales+streaming figures based on certification alone.

== Release history ==
Region	Date	Format(s)	Label(s)	Ref.
United States	May 13, 1997	Rhythmic contemporary; contemporary hit radio	Def Jam; Rush Associated Labels	
United Kingdom	May 19, 1997	12-inch vinyl; CD; cassette	Def Jam; Rush Associated Labels	
