= Reel Tight =

- Origin: Chattanooga, Tennessee
- Genres: R&B
- Years active: 1997–1999
- Label: G-Funk / Restless
- Members: Bobby Kane; Bobby Rice; Danny Johnson; Reggie Long

Reel Tight was an American R&B group from Chattanooga, Tennessee, consisting of singers Danny Johnson, Bobby Kane, Reggie Long, and Bobby Rice. They were discovered and mentored by Warren G. Their sole album Back to the Real was released in 1999, and two singles from the album reached the Billboard charts.

In 2011, songwriter Ernest Lee Straughter sued Usher over allegations that he plagiarized Reel Tight's "No More Pain".

== Discography ==
Year	Title	Chart positions	
Year	Title	U.S.	U.S. R&B
1999	Back to the Real: Released: April 13, 1999; Label: G-Funk / Restless	197	32
