= G-funk =

Music genre

- Stylistic origins: West Coast hip-hop; gangsta rap; funk; psychedelic funk
- Cultural origins: Late 1980s, Greater Los Angeles, California
- Typical instruments: DJ equipments; turntables; DJ mixer; music workstation; sampler; sequencer; drum machine; synthesizer; electric piano; electric guitar; electric bass guitar; talkbox

Regional scenes
- Greater Los Angeles, California

Local scenes
- Compton; Long Beach; Watts; South; Pomona

Other topics
- Mobb; hyphy; funktronica

Example of a G-funk instrumental

G-funk, short for gangsta funk, is a sub-genre of gangsta rap that emerged from the West Coast scene in the early 1990s. The genre is heavily influenced by the synthesizer-heavy 1970s funk sound of Parliament-Funkadelic (aka P-Funk), often incorporated through samples or re-recordings. It is represented by commercially successful albums such as Dr. Dre's The Chronic (1992), Snoop Dogg's Doggystyle (1993), and 2Pac's All Eyez on Me (1996).

== Characteristics ==
G-funk, which uses funk with an artificially altered tempo, incorporates multi-layered and melodic synthesizers, slow hypnotic grooves, a deep bass, heavy use of the snare drum, background female vocals, the extensive sampling of P-Funk tunes, and a high-pitched portamento saw wave synthesizer lead. G-funk is typically set at between 90 and 100 BPM. The lyrical content depended on the artist; it could consist of sex, drug use (especially marijuana), love for a city, and love for friends. There was also a slurred "lazy" or "smooth" way of rapping in order to clarify words and stay in rhythmic cadence. Many R&B and pop singles of the 1990s incorporated the G-funk sound to their music.

The trademark West Coast G-funk style of hip-hop was a very defining element of the region's music. The genre helped distinguish West Coast hip-hop from the rivaling rap scene on the East Coast. In essence, the smooth, slow-tempo sound of G-funk accompanied the perceived "laid-back" stereotype of Californian culture whereas East Coast hip-hop typically featured more aggressive attitudes alongside a fast-paced tempo (e.g. hardcore hip-hop).

Unlike other earlier rap acts that also utilized funk samples (such as EPMD and the Bomb Squad), G-funk often utilized fewer, unaltered samples per song. Music theorist Adam Krims has described G-funk as "a style of generally West Coast rap whose musical tracks tend to deploy live instrumentation, heavy on bass and keyboards, with minimal (sometimes no) sampling and often highly conventional harmonic progressions and harmonies". Dr. Dre, a pioneer of the G-funk genre, normally uses live musicians to replay the original music of sampled records. This enabled him to produce music that had his own sounds, rather than a direct copy of the sample.

== History and origins ==
=== 1987–1991: Beginning ===
Dr. Dre produced tracks by N.W.A such as "Dope Man" (1987) and "Gangsta Gangsta" (1988). Both tracks sampled the squealing synth solo from Ohio Players' "Funky Worm"; the song would later go on to be sampled many times by other artists, including Michigan duo MC Breed & DFC on their mid-1991 hit "Ain't No Future in Yo' Frontin'". This solo, moreover, provided the blueprint for G-funk's distinctive synth tone in later years. Dre also produced the D.O.C.'s "It's Funky Enough" and "The Formula" in 1989. The former was an early minor hit for the genre, reaching No. 12 on the Hot R&B/Hip-Hop Songs chart. Two years later, in 1991, N.W.A released another early example of the genre with their album Niggaz4Life; the album reached No. 1 on the Billboard 200, and No. 2 on Billboard's Top R&B/Hip-Hop Albums. The same year, Ice Cube's diss track towards N.W.A, "No Vaseline", was made in the style. Dr. Dre, who produced No One Can Do It Better and Niggaz4Life, is often seen as the originator/creator of the G-funk sound. However, these claims have been disputed with Cold 187um (a member of Above the Law) claiming that he came up with the name and sound.

=== 1992–1997: Mainstream peak ===
The genre experienced a breakout year in 1992, with Dr. Dre dropping his album The Chronic. The album was a massive success. It had three top 40 singles: "Nuthin' but a 'G' Thang", the Eazy-E diss track "Dre Day", and "Let Me Ride." It also reached No. 3 on the Billboard 200, and No. 1 on the Top R&B/Hip-Hop Albums chart. The album was eventually certified Triple Platinum by the RIAA in 1993 for selling three million copies; it has also been selected by the Library of Congress for preservation in the National Recording Registry for being "culturally, historically, or aesthetically significant". Though G-funk had previously existed, The Chronic is often seen as the beginning of the genre.

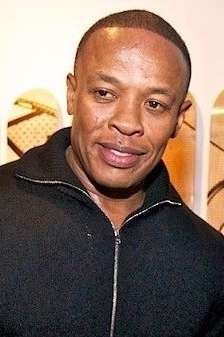
Dr. Dre, considered a pioneer of G-funk.

The following year had numerous successful songs and albums, such as Ice Cube's songs "It Was a Good Day" and "Check Yo Self"; both made it to the top 20 (peaking at No. 15 and No. 20 respectively) and were both certified at least gold. "It Was a Good Day" is commonly placed high on best of lists for the genre, being considered "one of the best G-Funk tracks ever made". Snoop Dogg released his first album Doggystyle, which debuted at No. 1 on the Billboard 200. The album contained the hits "Gin and Juice" and "What's My Name?"; both songs reached No. 8 on the Hot 100. The album was certified Quadruple Platinum, and both singles were certified gold. Eazy-E released the G-funk-influenced album It's On (Dr. Dre) 187um Killa, which reached No. 5 on the Billboard 200, and contained the No. 42 hit "Real Muthaphuckkin G's", which was made as a response to Dre's song "Dre Day" from the previous year.

The genre's popularity grew even bigger in 1994. This was early because of Warren G's song "Regulate", which was featured on the Above the Rim soundtrack. The single reached the top 10 peaking at No. 2. His album Regulate... G Funk Era which also contained the song, and another top 10 hit "This D.J.", reached No. 2 on the Billboard 200. Popular rapper MC Hammer went for a more gangsta image and G-funk sound on his album The Funky Headhunter, which contained the No. 26 single "Pumps and a Bump". The G-funk group Thug Life, featuring 2Pac, released their first and only album, Thug Life: Volume 1; it peaked at No. 42 on the Billboard 200. The album had minor hit single with "Cradle to the Grave". The song charted on the Hot R&B/Hip-Hop Songs and on the Hot Rap Songs charts; it placed No. 91 on the former and No. 25 on the latter. West coast rapper Coolio released his debut album It Takes a Thief in 1994. The album peaked at No. 8; it contains the Top-10 hit "Fantastic Voyage".

In 1995, 2Pac released the album Me Against the World; although it is not entirely G-funk, the album has been described as having "half the record [resound] to the boom and bap of New York" while having "the rest [shimmer] in a G-funk haze". The album reached No. 1 on the Billboard 200, and was certified Double Platinum. Later in the year, he released the G-funk classic "California Love" which as a double A-side with "How Do U Want It", hit No. 1 on the Hot 100. In October 1995, Tha Dogg Pound released their debut album Dogg Food and it debuted at No. 1 on the billboard, continuing G-funk's dominance in the mainstream with the top 50 singles "New York, New York" and "Let's Play House".

In 1996, 2Pac released his album All Eyez on Me, which has been described as "lush G-funk" and as having a "commercial G-funk sheen". The album hit No. 1. Later in this year the super-group Westside Connection released Bow Down. The album had two hit singles, "Bow Down" and "Gangstas Make the World Go Round", which peaked at No. 21 and No. 40, respectively. The album itself peaked at No. 2 on the Billboard 200, and was certified Platinum by the RIAA in 1997. In 1997, Warren G released his second album, Take a Look Over Your Shoulder, which peaked at No. 11 on the Billboard 200; it had two Top-40 singles, a cover of "I Shot the Sheriff" and "Smokin' Me Out".

Although the majority of G-funk has come out of California, the overall sound has been utilized by additional US rappers and hip-hop groups that were based in other states across the U.S. during the time of the style's popularity in the 1990s. Some of the most notable of these artists include Outkast (Georgia), G-Slimm (Louisiana), Bone Thugs-n-Harmony (Ohio), Tela (Tennessee), Top Authority (Michigan), E.S.G. (Texas) and DMG (Minnesota).

In the 1990s, Houston, Texas, had a small, but noteworthy, G-funk scene at the peak of the genre's popularity. Artists from the city include the Geto Boys, Blac Monks, E.S.G., 5th Ward Boyz, Street Military, Big Mello, Scarface, Ganksta N-I-P, Bushwick Bill, Big 50, 5th Ward Juvenilez and South Circle.

=== 1998–present: Influences on modern hip-hop ===
By the end of the 1990s and the beginning of the 2000s, G-funk significantly declined in mainstream popularity. Dr. Dre's 1999 album 2001, produced by Mel-Man in 1998 and released in 1999, was noted as "reinvent[ing] his sound, moving away from G-funk to something more gothic and string-heavy."

In 2001, Warren G released his fourth studio album, The Return of the Regulator. The album includes "Here Comes Another Hit" (which featured Nate Dogg and Mista Grimm) and Lookin' at You (featuring LaToiya Williams). The album can be considered a return to the roots of G-funk West Coast gangsta music; however, it sold less than the rapper's two previous albums.

Midwestern rapper Tech N9ne made use of the G-funk style on his early releases, most notably his second studio album, The Worst (2000). His 2001 follow-up album, Anghellic, incorporated the subgenre's characteristics to a much lesser extent.

Most recently, starting in the 2010s, many contemporary West Coast rappers have released albums which contain strong G-funk influences. Examples include Kendrick Lamar with Good Kid, M.A.A.D City as well as To Pimp a Butterfly, YG with Still Brazy, Schoolboy Q with Blank Face LP, Nipsey Hussle with Victory Lap, Buddy with Harlan & Alondra and Tech N9ne with The Gates Mixed Plate.

== See also ==
- Golden age hip-hop
- List of G-funk artists and producers
- Ice-T
