= G-Funk Entertainment =

American record label

- Parent company: Universal Music Group
- Founded: 1995
- Founder: Warren G
- Distributor: Fontana Distribution
- Genre: West Coast hip hop; G-funk; R&B
- Country of origin: United States
- Location: Los Angeles, California

G-Funk Entertainment (formerly known as G-Funk Records and later renamed G-Funk 2000: The New Millennium) is an American vanity label founded by West Coast hip hop artist Warren G. It was a subsidiary of Def Jam Recordings, where it was dropped off and signed to Restless Records in 1998 under a new name to finally arrive to Hawino Records as G-Funk Entertainment in 2005, where Warren G released his album In the Mid-Nite Hour.

== Roster ==
- Warren G
- Reel Tight
- Jessica Betts
- Twinz
- Da 5 Footaz
- The Dove Shack

== See also ==
- List of record labels
