= Warren G =

American rapper (born 1970)

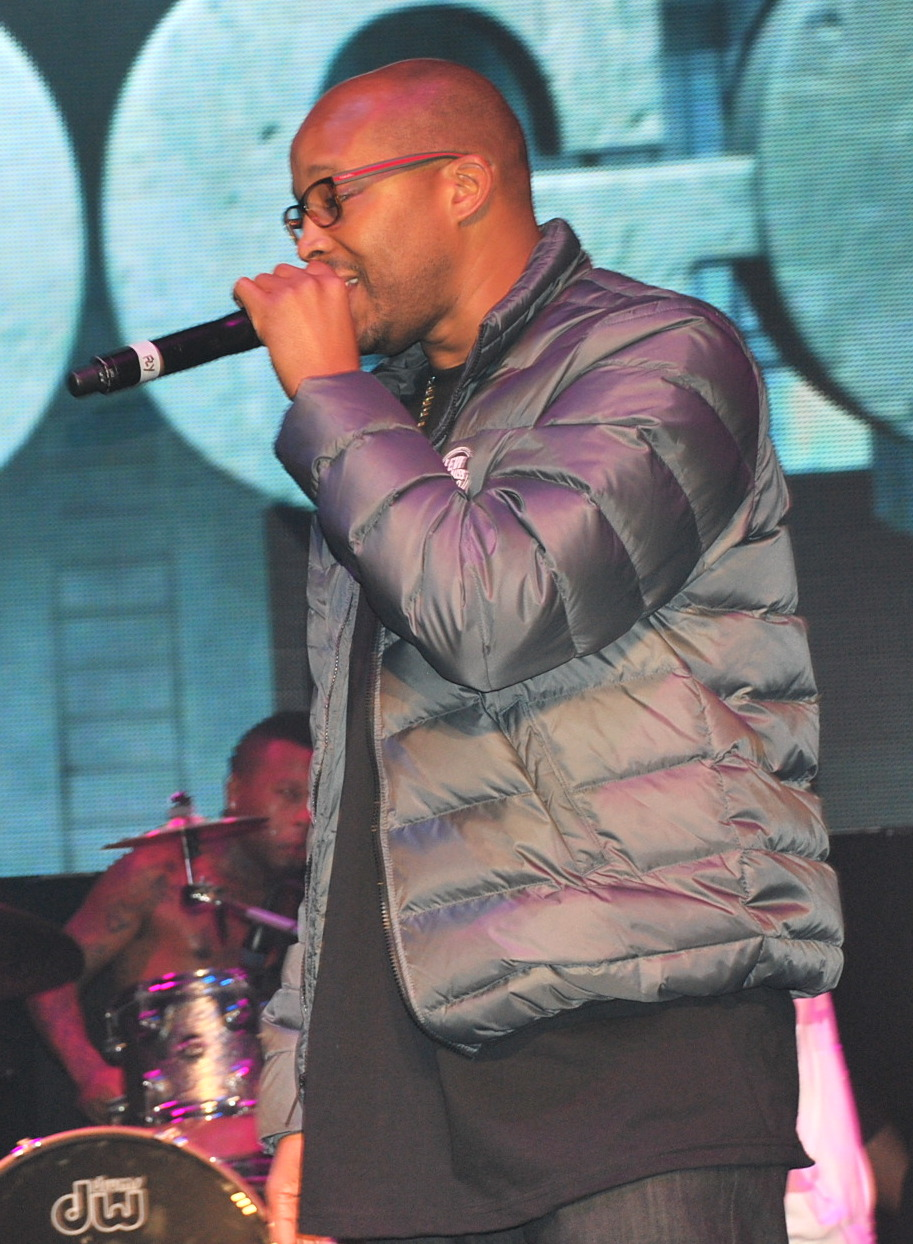
- Warren G in 2015
- Born: Warren Griffin III; November 10, 1970 (age 56); Long Beach, California, U.S.
- Other names: G-Child, G-Dub
- Occupations: Rapper; songwriter; record producer; disc jockey; actor
- Years active: 1990–present
- Spouse: Tennile Griffin (m. 1998)
- Children: 6, including Olaijah
- Relatives: Dr. Dre (step-brother)
- Awards: Full list
- Musical career
- Genres: West Coast hip-hop; G-funk
- Labels: G-Funk; Violator; RAL; Def Jam
- Formerly of: 213
- Website: warreng.com

Warren Griffin III (born November 10, 1970) is an American rapper, record producer and DJ. He is known for his role in popularizing West Coast hip hop during the 1990s, and is credited as a pioneer of its subgenre G-funk.

Griffin attained mainstream success with his 1994 single "Regulate" (featuring Nate Dogg), which peaked at number 2 on the Billboard Hot 100. His debut album, Regulate... G Funk Era (1994), debuted at number 2 on the U.S. Billboard 200, selling 176,000 in its first week. It has since received triple Platinum certification by the Recording Industry Association of America (RIAA), signifying sales of three million copies. "Regulate" spent 18 weeks within the Top 40 of the Billboard Hot 100, with three weeks at number 2, while its follow-up, "This D.J.", peaked at number 9. At the 37th Annual Grammy Awards, both songs received nominations for Best Rap Performance and Best Rap Solo Performance.

Three songs from his second album, Take a Look Over Your Shoulder (1997), peaked within the Top 40, as did his 1998 duet with Nate Dogg, "Nobody Does It Better". Both the album and its follow-up, I Want It All (1999), received Gold certifications by the RIAA. His fourth album, The Return of the Regulator (2001), was less of a success. Along with longtime collaborators Snoop Dogg and Nate Dogg, he formed the hip-hop trio 213, named for Long Beach, California's area code; they released the album The Hard Way (2004) to mild success. His next two albums, 2005's In the Mid-Nite Hour and then 2009's The G Files, were released independently and self-produced.

He is credited with discovering Snoop Dogg, having introduced the rapper to record producer Dr. Dre. In 2015, he released Regulate... G Funk Era, Part II, an extended play featuring archived recordings of Nate Dogg, who died in 2011.

== Early life ==
Warren Griffin III was born on November 10, 1970, and grew up in Long Beach, California. He had three sisters and was the only son of Warren Griffin Jr., an airplane mechanic, and Ola, a dietician. His parents divorced when Griffin was four, and he lived with his mother and three sisters in East Long Beach.

In 1982, Griffin went to live with his father in North Long Beach. His new stepmother, Verna, had three children from a prior marriage, one of whom was Andre Young (Dr. Dre), who in the mid-1980s was a member of the electro-rap group World Class Wreckin' Cru, which in 1987 put out the Los Angeles area's first rap recording under a major label. Griffin attended Jordan High School and played football.

In 1988, Griffin was jailed at age 17 for gun possession. While incarcerated, he took the nickname Warren G. By this time, Dr. Dre was already beginning to experience success as the writer and record producer for Ruthless Records, as well as being a member of N.W.A with Ruthless Records founder Eazy-E and Ice Cube. N.W.A's landmark album, Straight Outta Compton (1989), was driving the Los Angeles area's rap scene to swiftly drop electro for gangsta. After his release, Griffin worked at the Long Beach shipyards and began focusing on music after Dr. Dre taught him how to use a drum machine.

By 1990, Warren G had formed the trio 213 with two longtime running mates, Nate Dogg and Snoop Dogg. 213 was a contributor to the G-funk sound soon to emerge in rap. The trio dissolved after Warren G connected them to Dr. Dre. At that point, two solo careers were launched: Dr. Dre's and Snoop Dogg's, upon G-funk. Nate, too, signed to Dr. Dre's Death Row Records. Warren G initially helped there; not desiring a career in his mentor and stepbrother's shadow, however, he signed to Def Jam Recordings in New York City.

== Career ==
=== Start with 213 (circa 1990) ===
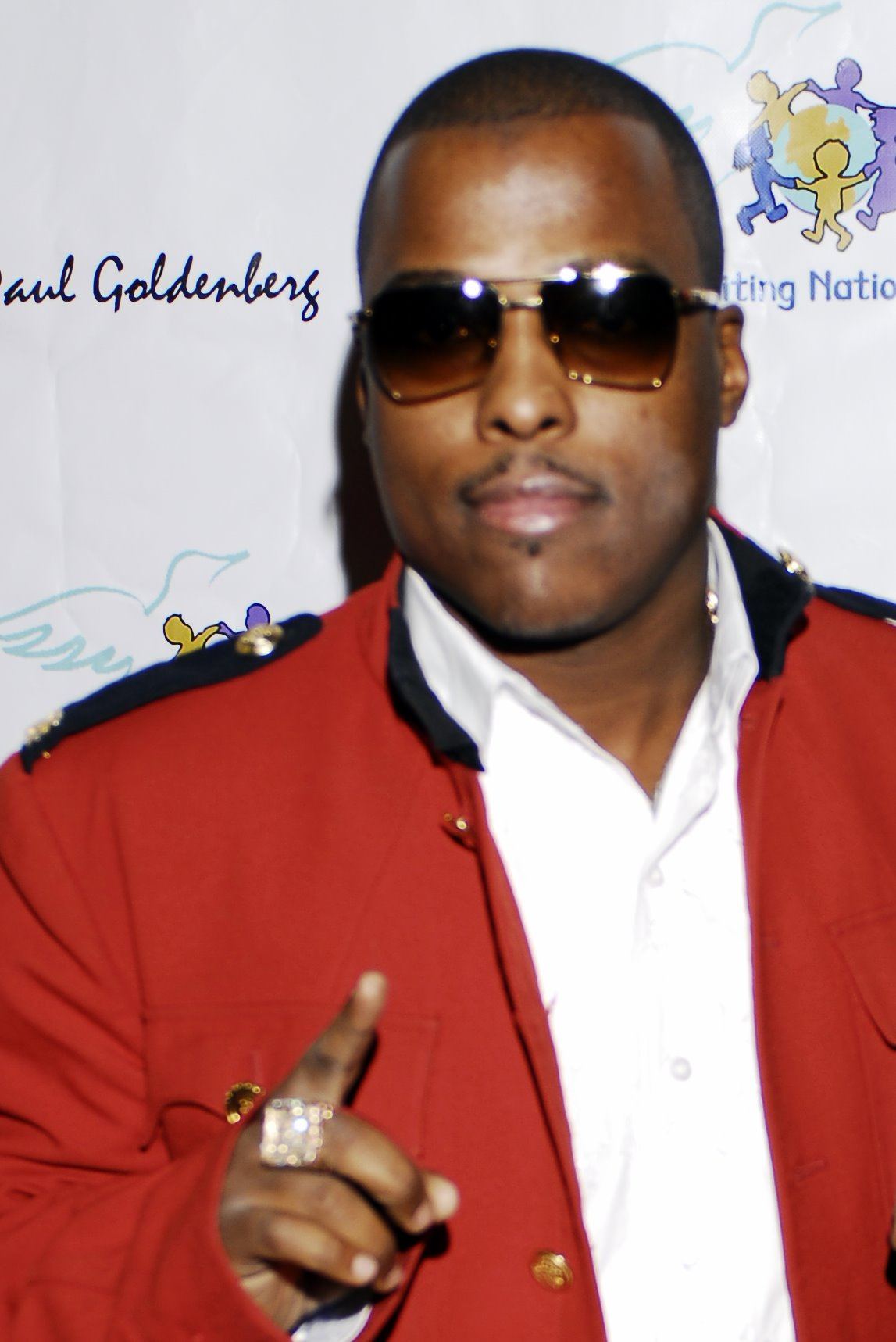
Warren G. at the 79th Annual Academy Awards Children United afterparty (Mueller, 2007)

By 1990, as a record producer and rapper, Griffin formed a music trio with two of his longtime running mates, Nate Dogg and Snoop Dogg, in his hometown of Long Beach. In his 1994 single "Do You See", Warren G reminisces on his background, while incidentally noting, twice, that 213 had originally been Warren G, Nate Dogg, and Snoop Rock, amid visuals that briefly show the V.I.P record shop [Warren G, a singerlike rapper. The Long Beach trio, fond of Oakland rap group 415, named for the Bay area's area code, took the name 213, the Los Angeles area's. Practicing and recording in the modest studio in Long Beach record store V.I.P., they cut a demo tape. Dr. Dre, already a celebrity, rebuffed his younger stepbrother Griffin's requests for him to listen.

Before long, homemade copies of 213's songs spread in Los Angeles county, particularly the cities Compton and Pomona, and Los Angeles city's sections Watts and South Central, but no label picked them up. One day, Griffin phoned Dre to catch up, and found him at a bachelor party—thrown for Dre's friend Andre "LA Dre" Bolton, another record producer—whereupon Griffin found himself invited to join it. There, once the songs began to repeat, Griffin offered LA Dre the 213 tape. Liking it, he summoned Dr. Dre, who, hearing the Snoop rap "Super Duper Snooper", immediately welcomed the trio. Days later, 213 moved into Dre's lavish troubadour-style house in Calabasas, home to both his wife and his recording studio.

In April 1992, Dr. Dre's debut solo single "Deep Cover" introduced America to Snoop Doggy Dogg, the track's guest but instantly star rapper. Griffin helped Dre find sounds for Dre's debut solo album The Chronic, further debuting Snoop, whereby superstardom chased Snoop into 1993 and, via Snoop's own debut solo album, Doggystyle, captured him by 1994. By then, also solo, Nate, too, had joined Dre's label, Death Row Records. Griffin, returning to Long Beach, aimed to find his own way. In 2004, a 213 album finally arrived: The Hard Way.

=== Solo stardom (1993–1996) ===
During 1993, at Dr. Dre's studio, Griffin met John Singleton, director of Boyz n the Hood, the seminal film named for Eazy-E's debut single, produced by Dre. Singleton asked Griffin to produce a song for the soundtrack of his forthcoming film Poetic Justice. Griffin thus produced Mista Grimm's song "Indo Smoke", featuring Warren G and Nate Dogg. The single's success led to Griffin's invitation to Russell Simmons's label Def Jam Recordings, where Warren G signed a record deal. Also that year, Griffin and Nate, along with Kurupt—whom the 213 trio had brought to Dre to help on his album The Chronic—feature on "Ain't No Fun (If the Homies Can't Have None)", a huge underground hit, too risque to be a single, on Snoop's Doggystyle album, released in November.

On the Above The Rim soundtrack, from Death Row Records in April 1994, the single "Regulate" was a duet cowritten and performed by Warren G and Nate Dogg. Spending 20 weeks on the popular songs chart, the Billboard Hot 100, with 18 of them in the Top 40, including three weeks at No. 2 in May, it was the summer's top rap hit. Certified gold, half a million copies sold, since June, it attained platinum, a million copies, in August. In January 2017, via digital downloading, it was certified 2x multi-platinum. Back in the American summer of 1994, it stood at No. 1 on the MTV charts. Performing in Japan, he would discover fans who apparently understood no English, but knew all the lyrics. Into the 21st century, it remained Def Jam's biggest hit single. Russell Simmons, a Def Jam founder, explains, "Warren's music was worldwide because the melody plays no matter what the language."

Yet further, unlike other G-funk (short for gangsta funk) artists, Warren G, even called "a romantic" at heart, voiced simpler concerns. And his modest rap styling maximized, by heeding, his modest lyricism. "Regulate" doubled as the lead single Warren G's debut album, Regulate... G Funk Era, arriving in June 1994. Selling a million copies in three days, it debuted at No. 2 on the popular albums chart, the Billboard 200. In August, it was certified 2x multi-platinum, two million copies sold. Its second single, "This D.J.", went gold, half a million copies, in September, while peaking in July at No. 9. At the 1995 Grammy Awards, in March, both singles were nominated. And in January, the album's other single, "Do You See", had peaked at No. 42. In August, the album was certified 3x multi-platinum. That month also brought some Warren G collaborations on two albums from his Long Beach associates, Twinz only album Conversation (album) and The Dove Shack trio's This Is the Shack. And 1996 saw Warren G on the "Groupie" track of Snoop's second album, Tha Doggfather.

=== Follow-up albums (1997–2001) ===
Warren G's second album, Take a Look Over Your Shoulder, released in March 1997. It was certified gold, with half a million copies sold, in May. Sharing with the Supercop soundtrack the single "What's Love Got To Do with It", featuring singer Adina Howard, a spin on the 1984 single by Tina Turner, reached No. 2 on the UK Singles Chart, and peaked in the U.S. at No. 32 on the Billboard Hot 100. "Smokin' Me Out", featuring Ron Isley of the classic soul group, reaching No. 35, was big on the Los Angeles area's radio play. "I Shot the Sheriff", a lyrical spin on the 1973 single by Bob Marley & the Wailers, yet an instrumental borrow from rap group EPMD's 1988 single "Strictly Business", which itself samples that Wailers classic, reached No. 20. Yet a letdown overall, the album missed his debut's superstar potential.

In July 1998, Warren G's sixth appearance in the Billboard Hot 100's upper tier Top 40 became Nate Dogg's single "Nobody Does it Better"—on Nate's repeatedly delayed debut album—featuring Warren G, in another duet, which peaked at No. 18 on the Billboard Hot 100. Here, incidentally, Griffin raps a bar indicating his transition to family life. Warren's third album, I Want It All, released in October 1999, has Griffin mainly producing—where, perhaps, his greater comparative strength among musical peers abides—while vocals go largely to guest artists, including Nate Dogg, Snoop Dogg, RBX, Kurupt, Eve, Slick Rick, and Jermaine Dupri. Certified gold in November 1999, it bears the single "I Want It All", featuring Mack 10, which, becoming Warren's most recent Top 40 appearance, peaked on the Hot 100 at No. 23.

Over 20 years later, his 1997 and 1999 albums remain at gold certification, which none of his subsequent albums have achieved. Released in December 2001, Warren's fourth album, The Return of the Regulator, with a litany of collaborators, including the P-Funk father and G-funk godfather George Clinton and, elsewhere, Dr. Dre producing a track, is allegedly overdone, a comeback undone by Warren's reaching beyond his strengths and being outdone by his guests. He "wastes a hot, Dre-produced beat", in the single "Lookin' at You", alleges a Vibe writer, who finds G-funk on its deathbed and Warren G "administering the fatal shot". The album peaked at number 83 the Billboard 200, and became his final album under a major record label, here Universal Music Group, before returned on an independent label.

=== Indie career (2005–present) ===
On on October the 11th, 2005, Warren G released his ftith album In the Mid-Nite Hour through Hawino Records which was his first release without a major Record label being involved. The album featured his groupmates from his former group 213 Nate Dogg and Snoop Dogg on many of the tracks in the album. In The Mid-Nite Hour is devotedly Warren's own project since it was homemade on a low budget. Music critics evaluated the album to carry Warren's own behavior as a regular G-funk artist.

His sixth album, in September 2009, The G Files, "still the same basic G-funk sound", adds to "that classic soul vibe", Griffin explains, "a taste of that modern electro sound". Disliking what he put as the rap standard of "some drums and one synth sound", he titled "The West is Back" for return to "that great soulful sound". "100 Miles and Running" features Nate Dogg—recorded before Nate's strokes in 2007 and 2008—and the Wu-Tang Clan's Raekwon.

From June to September 2013, Griffin toured in the West Coast Fest, "an OG affair" with DJ Quik, Mack 10, the Dogg Pound, Bone Thugs N Harmony, and others. Meanwhile, in a guest role, Griffin played OG Hemingway in the sitcom Newsreaders on the Cartoon Network's Adult Swim programming. And in August 2014, on the Mnet channel's reality series American Hustle Life, he directed an alternate music video for "Boy In Luv", by South Korean boy band BTS.

Nostalgic fans would ask Griffin for more of classic G-funk, and even ask for more from Nate Dogg, who had died in 2011. The single "My House", leading Warren G's first EP, arrived on July 13, 2015. With four songs, the EP, premised as a sequel to the 1994 original, is titled Regulate... G Funk Era, Part II. Released on August 6, it features E-40, Too Short, Jeezy, Bun B, and, in all four songs, Nate Dogg. With his unique knack for intuiting Griffin's production cues, Nate leaves behind some of his 213 partner's favorite recordings.

== Other ventures ==
In 2019, Warren G launched a line of barbecue sauces and rubs, Sniffin Griffin's BBQ, for retail and restaurant supply. This was inspired by his father, a cook in the U.S. Navy and avid barbecue chef.

In October 2025, Warren G collaborated with Howlin' Ray's to create a pop-up kitchen in Long Beach. A limited-edition entry listed under "Howlin' Ray's Long Beach" on Postmates allowed customers to choose from three combo meal options, some of which were accompanied by exclusive sticker sets or T-shirts. In 2025, Warren G joined the ownership group of the Long Beach Coast in the independent Pioneer League beginning in the 2026 season.

== Personal life ==
Griffin has six children with his wife, Tennile Griffin. Getting older, increasingly identifying with his father, fond of cooking and storytelling, Warren G embraces "his morals and good family fun".

His oldest son, Olaijah, played college football for the USC Trojans at the cornerback position from 2018 to 2020; he was also recognized with all-conference honors in 2019 and 2020. In April 2021, Olaijah was signed by the NFL's Buffalo Bills as an undrafted free agent.

== Discography ==
Studio albums

- Regulate... G Funk Era (1994)
- Take a Look Over Your Shoulder (1997)
- I Want It All (1999)
- The Return of the Regulator (2001)
- In the Mid-Nite Hour (2005)
- The G Files (2009)

Collaborative albums

- The Hard Way (with 213) (2004)

== Filmography ==
- The Show (1995)
- Speedway Junky (1999)
- Little Richard (2000)
- The Parkers (2000)
- Old School (2003)
- All of Us (2005)
- BTS American Hustle Life (2014)
- The Eric Andre Show (2016), 1 episode

== Video games ==
- Rap Jam: Volume One (1995)
- Def Jam: Fight for NY (2004)
- Def Jam Fight for NY: The Takeover (2006)

== Awards and nominations ==
=== Grammy Awards ===
Year	Song	Category	Result
1995	"Regulate"	Best Rap Performance by a Duo or Group	Nominated
1995	"This D.J."	Best Rap Solo Performance	Nominated

=== American Music Awards ===
Year	Nominee / work	Award	Result
1995	Warren G	Favorite Rap/Hip-Hop Artist	Nominated

=== Brit Awards ===
Year	Nominee / work	Award	Result
1995	Warren G	International Male Solo Artist	Nominated
1995	Warren G	International Breakthrough Act	Nominated

=== MTV Movie & TV Awards ===
Year	Nominee / work	Award	Result
1995	Regulate	Best Song from a Movie	Nominated

=== Soul Train Music Awards ===
Year	Nominee / work	Award	Result
1995	Regulate...G Funk Era	Best Rap Album	Nominated

=== NME Awards ===
Year	Nominee / work	Award	Result
1995	Warren G	Best Rap Artist	Won
