= Sticky Fingaz discography =

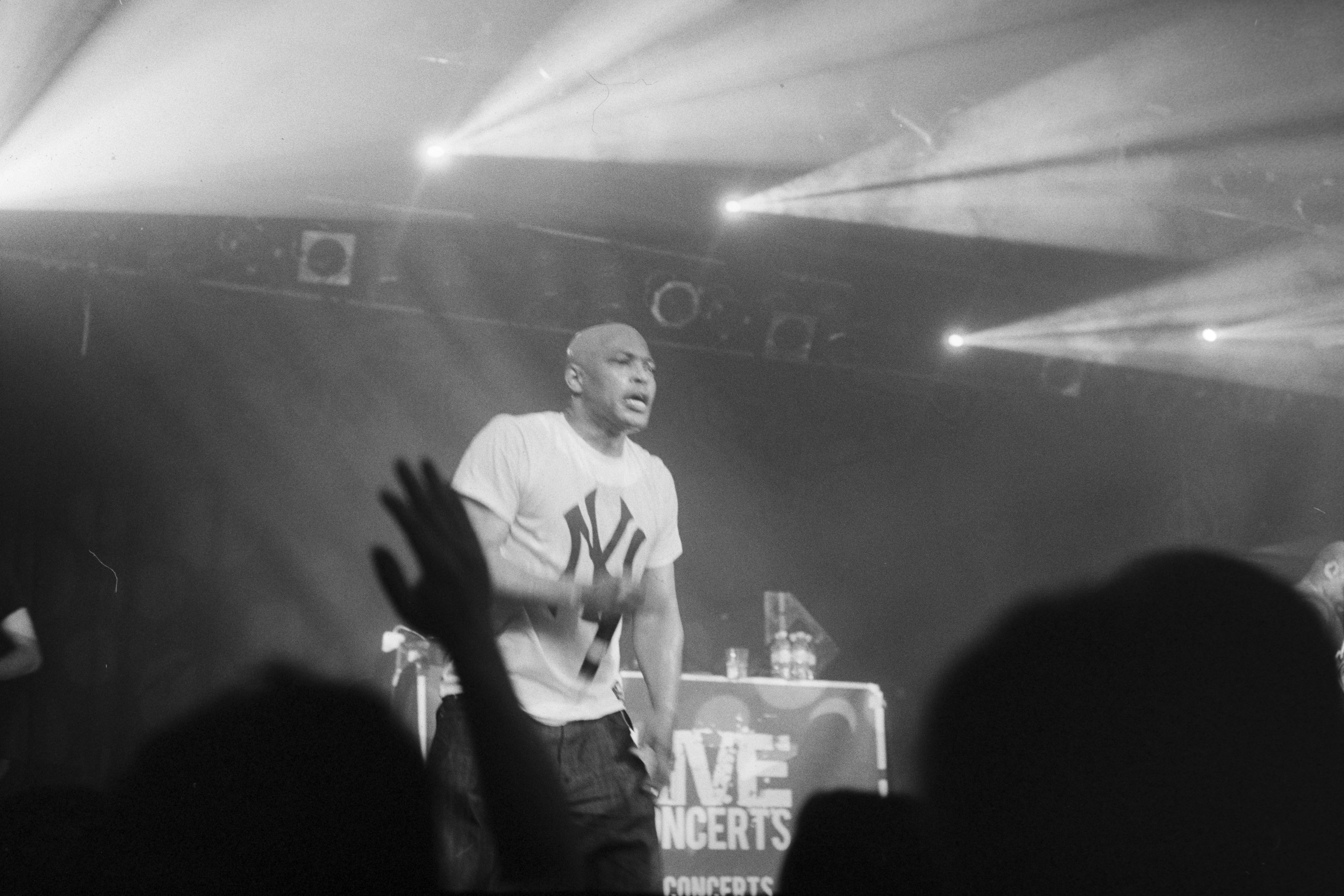
- Sticky Fingaz at a concert in München (2014)
- Studio albums: 3
- Soundtrack albums: 3
- Compilation albums: 2
- Singles: 16
- Music videos: 20

The discography of Sticky Fingaz, American hardcore rapper, record producer, actor, film director, film editor and writer, best known as a member of multi-platinum hardcore rap group Onyx, consists of 3 solo studio albums, 2 compilation albums, 3 soundtrack albums, 13 singles.

In 1991, Sticky Fingaz was discovered by Jam Master Jay of Run-D.M.C., who signed Onyx on his label JMJ Records provided that Sticky will be in the group. His signature lazy eye, raspy voice, and boundless energy brought attention to the group, and he became the front man. Onyx went on to release three top-selling albums before Sticky Fingaz began his solo career. As a part of Onyx, Sticky Fingaz was nominated as "Rap/Hip-Hop New Artist" on American Music Awards and won "Best Rap Album" on Soul Train Music Awards.

== Studio albums ==
List of studio albums, with selected chart positions
Title	Album details	Peak chart positions	
Title	Album details	US	US R&B/ HH
Black Trash: The Autobiography of Kirk Jones	Released: May 22, 2001; Label: Universal; Formats: CD, MD, LP	44	10
Decade: "...but wait it gets worse"	Released: April 29, 2003; Label: D3; Formats: CD, MD, LP	176	37
It's About T.I.M.E.	Released: February 14, 2019; Label: Major Independents; Formats: MD, LP, USB		

== Mixtapes ==
List of mixtapes
Title	Mixtape details
Stickyfingaz.com	Released: February, 2009; Label: Major Independents
God of the Underground	Released: April 21, 2010; Label: Ill Mannered Records, Major Independents

=== Soundtrack albums ===
- August 22, 2000: The Original Kings Of Comedy - "Ghetto" by Sticky Fingaz (feat. Petey Pablo)
- July 14, 2009: A Day in the Life
- February 5, 2013: Caught On Tape

== Singles ==
=== As lead artist ===
List of singles, with selected chart positions, showing year released and album name
Title	Year	Peak chart positions			Album
Title	Year	(United States) Billboard Hot 100	(United States) Hot R&B/Hip-Hop Songs	(United States) Hot Rap Tracks	Album
1999	"Sticky Fingaz vs. 50 Cent (Jackin' For Beats)"	—	—	—	
2000	"Get It Up"	—	—	—	Black Trash: The Autobiography of Kirk Jones
2001	"Come On"	—	—	—	Black Trash: The Autobiography of Kirk Jones
2001	"Ghetto"	—	—	—	Black Trash: The Autobiography of Kirk Jones
2001	"Baby Brother"	—	—	—	Black Trash: The Autobiography of Kirk Jones
2003	"Can't Call It"	—	—	—	Decade: "...but wait it gets worse"
2008	"Debo The Game"	—	—	—	Debo The Game - Single
2012	"(Theme From) Changing The Game"	—	—	—	Changing The Game - Soundtrack
2012	"Rap Starr" (feat. Heidi Marie)	—	—	—	Rap Starr - Single
2015	"Unwonderful World"	—	—	—	Unwonderful World - Single
2015	"Man Up" (Dirty Version)	—	—	—	Man Up - Single
2016	"Celebrate Life" (feat. Just Gii)	—	—	—	Celebrate Life (feat. Just Gii) - Single
2017	"Ebenezer Scrooge" (feat. N.O.R.E.)	—	—	—	Ebenezer Scrooge (feat. N.O.R.E.) - Single
2019	«Bust Down» (Kodak Black Diss)	—	—	—	Bust Down (Kodak Black Diss) — Single
2019	«Listen Up» (feat. Bubba Smiff)	—	—	—	Listen Up (feat. Bubba Smiff) — Single
2023	«Blink»	—	—	—	Blink - Single

=== As lead artist (Free singles) ===
- 1995: "Ain't Like That" from New York Undercover (season 1 episode 17)
- 1995: "You Gets No Respect" from New York Undercover (season 1 episode 17)
- 1996: "Freestyle" from Tony Touch - #50 - Power Cypha (Featuring 50 MCs)
- 1998: "Freestyle" from Sway & King Tech - Wake Up Show Freestyles Vol. 4
- 1999: "Come On" by Sticky Fingaz from Green Lantern - It's Just Us And The Guns
- 1999: "I Want" by Sticky Fingaz, X1 from DJ Whoo Kid - Set It Off Part 4
- 1999: "Hard To Be A Thug" from DJ Whoo Kid - Niggas Don't Want It!, DJ Envy - Keep It Gangsta, DJ Green Lantern - Rookie Of The Year
- 1999: "Livin-N-Hell" (feat. X1 & Blaze) from Various Artists The Union presents: Organized Rhymes
- 2000: "The Price Of Air"
- 2000: "Freestyle" from DJ Whoo Kid -N- DJ Stretch Armstrong - Murda Mixtape Pt. 4
- 2001: "Freestyle" from DJ Whoo Kid -N- DJ Stretch Armstrong - Final Destination
- 2001: "Feel It" (feat. Dr. Dre) from DJ Whoo Kid - The Afterparty Part 11
- 2004: "Man Up" from Def Jam: Fight for NY (Soundtrack)
- 2006: "You Know Me" from Breaking Point (Soundtrack)
- 2008: "One Way Or Another" (feat. Domination)
- 2008: "Some Of Us Got 2 Rob" (feat. Mr. D & Treach)
- 2009: "Da Next (feat. M Bars, Peeple$)
- 2009: "Dough Boys" (feat. Begetz) from Dough Boys (Soundtrack)
- 2009: "Eastwest Shyt" (feat. Knoc-Turn'al, Ms Roq, W-Ballz)
- 2009: "I Will Get Ya (Freestyle)"
- 2009: "Raised In The System" (a.k.a. "Just Tryin' To Get By") (feat. DCAP)
- 2009: "We Bring Gangsta To You"
- 2009: "You Don't Know Me" (a.k.a. "The Whole Damn New York")

== Guest appearances ==
- 1998: "Strange Fruit" by Pete Rock (feat. Tragedy Khadafi, Cappadonna, Sticky Fingaz) from Pete Rock Soul Survivor
- 1998: "Live for Today" by M.A.D. Kutz (feat. Sticky Fingaz) from M.A.D. Kutz - Reelizm
- 1998: "Massive Heat" by Lord Tariq & Peter Gunz (feat. Kurupt & Sticky Fingaz) from Lord Tariq & Peter Gunz Make It Reign
- 1999: "Thugz Cry (Freestyle)" by Flesh-N-Bone, Wish Bone & Sticky Fingaz for 92.3
- 1999: "Buck 'Em" by Snoop Dogg (feat. Sticky Fingaz) from Snoop Dogg No Limit Top Dogg
- 1999: "New World Disorder" by Biohazard (feat. Sticky Fingaz, Christian Olde Wolbers & Igor Cavalera) from Biohazard New World Disorder
- 1999: "Full Clip (Remix)" by Gang Starr (feat. Sticky Fingaz) from Gang Starr - Full Clip Remix / Work Remix
- 2000: "Remember Me" by Eminem, RBX & Sticky Fingaz from DJ Evil Dee - Ha!! Ha!!
- 2000: "Ballers (Up In Here) (Universal Gangsters Platinum Remix)" by Ram Squad feat. Sticky Fingaz & Nelly from Ram Squad – Ballers (Up In Here) (Remixes & Instrumentals)
- 2000: "Look Out" by Caz (feat. Sticky Fingaz and Rappin' 4-Tay) from Caz - Thundadome
- 2000: "Love Of My Life" by De'Sean Superstar (feat. Sticky Fingaz)
- 2000: "Remember Me?"" by Eminem (feat. Sticky Fingaz & RBX) from Eminem The Marshall Mathers LP
- 2000: "Get It Up (Remix)" by Xzibit (feat. Sticky Fingaz, Method Man & Redman) from Xzibit Likwit Rhymes
- 2001: "Get Up (Remix)" by Sticky Fingaz, Method Man, Redman, Xzibit from DJ Whoo Kid & Stretch Armstrong - Unbreakable - Dirty Money 2001
- 2001: "What If I Was White" by Sticky Fingaz (feat. Eminem) from Various Artists Down To Earth Soundtrack
- 2001: "Money Talks" by Sticky Fingaz (feat. Raekwon) from Tony Touch - #64 - Rockin' Steadily
- 2001: "Get It Up (Remix)" by Sticky Fingaz (feat. Xzibit, Method Man & Redman) from Tony Touch - #64 - Rockin' Steadily
- 2001: "Freestyle" by Sticky Fingaz from DJ Whoo Kid & Stretch Armstrong - Final Destination
- 2001: "Thug Warz" by Fredro Starr (feat. The Outlawz and Sticky Fingaz) from Fredro Starr Firestarr
- 2001: "Soldierz" by Fredro Starr (feat. Sticky Fingaz & X1) from Fredro Starr Firestarr
- 2002: "See Thru My Eyes" by Johnny Blanco (feat. Sticky Fingaz)
- 2002: "The Rah Rah Nigga" by MC Eiht (feat. Sticky Fingaz) from MC Eiht - Underground Hero
- 2002: "Kill A Man" by Sticky Fingaz & Bizarre
- 2003: "All Out" by Fredro Starr (feat. Begetz, Sticky Fingaz & X-1) from Fredro Starr Don't Get Mad Get Money
- 2003: "Gangsta" by Concise (feat. Sticky Fingers And Checkmate) from Concise - F.A.M.E.
- 2003: "Do It Do It" by Sticky Fingaz & Method Man from Essman - Esspionage, Vol. 1
- 2004: "How I'm Livin'" by Double A & Sticky Fingaz from Doing Hard Time (OST)
- 2004: "Life" by G'Sharp, Omar Epps & Sticky Fingaz from BKNYCRecords Presents... The Get Back. Volume 1
- 2005: "Exclusive" by Sticky Fingaz from DJ Suprema One - Supremacy Volume 1
- 2006: "Back Again" by Basscamp & Sticky Fingaz from Basscamp & Sticky Fingaz - Southern Face
- 2006: "How High" by Ta Smallz (feat. Sticky Fingaz) from Ta Smallz - Having My Way
- 2006: "Money" by Sticky Fingers, 4Tay* & Caz from Layzie Bone & Mo Thugs Presents Various - 100% Pure Thug Tour
- 2007: "Get Lifted (Remix)" by The Whoridas (feat. Sticky Fingaz)
- 2008: "Cocaine Sex" by Nemesis Jackson (feat. Macy Gray & Sticky Fingers) from Nemesis Jackson - Snacs Vol. 1
- 2008: "Just Like You" by Skit Slam & The Beatnikz (feat. Cymarshall Law & Sticky Fingaz) from Skit Slam & The Beatnikz - A Blessing In Disguise
- 2009: "That's Still The Way" by Bishop Brigante (feat. MC Lyte & Sticky Fingaz) from Bishop Brigante - The Value Of A Hustle
- 2009: "Afraid Of Death" by C-Trizh (feat. Sticky Fingaz, Zeriouz) from C-Trizh - The Sampler
- 2010: "We Be G's" by M.O.P. (Feat. Sticky Fingaz & Busta Rhymes) from M.O.P. - Clear The Whole Projects (Mixtape)
- 2010: "Clappin!" by Mic Griffin (feat. Sticky Fingaz and Tash) from Mic Griffin - Gzup.com
- 2011: "O.P.M. (Other Peoples Money)" by Angerville (feat. Johnny Rourke & Sticky Fingaz)
- 2011: "Sticky Fingaz Freestyle" by Sticky Fingaz from Annakin Slayd - Once More We Survive
- 2012: "Royalty" by DJ Lordjazz (feat. Doitall, Mr. Funke, J-Ro, Tash & Sticky Fingaz) from DJ Lordjazz - The Plain Dealer
- 2012: "Unleashed" by Jah Skillz (feat. Xzibit, Sticky Fingaz & Da 5 Footaz) from Jah Skillz - Who Is Diana Floss?
- 2012: "Dramitics" by Makem Pay (feat. Sticky Fingaz) from DJ Smooth Montana - Rise Of Power 3
- 2012: "Whoop Ass" by Oh No (feat. Sticky Fingaz) from Oh No - Ohnomite
- 2013: "Fine Day" by Makem Pay (feat. Sticky Fingaz & Rah Bigalow)
- 2013: "Heavy With the Drop" by HMan (feat. Sticky Fingaz) from HMan - R.A.W (Rolling and Winning)
- 2013: "Europe Top Team - Unstoppable" by D.One (feat. Sticky Fingaz) from D.One - Europe Top Team: Unstoppable
- 2013: "Black Russians" by Славо (feat. Sticky Fingaz, Спрут) from Славо - ГРЕМУЧАЯ СМЕСЬ
- 2014: "Keep It Moving" by Pknuckle (feat. Sticky Fingaz & R-Mean) from Pknuckle - EPIC
- 2014: "Death Warrant" by Sadistik (feat. Sticky Fingaz & Tech N9Ne) from Sadistik Ultraviolet
- 2015: "Scum Bag" by Merkules (feat. Sticky Fingaz) from Merkules - Scars
- 2015: "True-n-Livin' Nightmares" by William Cooper (feat. Reef The Lost Cauze & Sticky Fingaz) from William Cooper - God's Will
- 2016: "Get 'Em Now" by Empire Cast (feat. Sticky Fingaz) from Empire Cast - Get 'Em Now - Single
- 2016: "Same G'z by Johnny Rourke (feat. Sticky Fingaz, JBRU, The K.I.D., P.Moody, 3D, Ghetto Child, Bobby Vintage)
- 2016: "I Can't Breathe" by Samuel L. Jackson, Sticky Fingaz, Talib Kweli, Mad Lion, Brother J & KRS-One
- 2016: "The 90's Are Back" by Snowgoons (feat O.C., DoItAll, UG, Sticky Fingaz, Dres, Nine, Sonny Seeza, Ras Kass & Psycho Les) from Snowgoons Goon Bap
- 2017: "Inferno" by Empire Cast (feat. Remy Ma & Sticky Fingaz) from Empire Cast - Inferno (feat. Remy Ma & Sticky Fingaz) - Single
- 2017: "Crime Lords" by Thirstin Howl The 3rd (feat. Sticky Fingaz) from Thirstin Howl The 3rd - Skillmatic
- 2018: "Time Of My Life" by Brand B (feat. Sticky Fingaz) from Brand B - The End Was Just The Beginning
- 2018: "Pass the Mic" by D.Craze the Destroyer (feat. Gorilla Voltage, Bizzy Bone, Chino XL & Sticky Fingaz) from D.Craze the Destroyer - The Great Unknown
- 2018: "I'm a G (Remix)" by Mr. ESQ (feat. Merkules, Sticky Fingaz & Method Man) from Mr. ESQ Kriminal Ties - EP
- 2018: "All Handz on Deck" by Optimystic (feat. Sticky Fingaz & Rockness Monsta) from Optimystic Salty Waterz
- 2020: "Judgement" by American Terror (feat. Sticky Fingaz) [Remix]
- 2020: "Hip-Hop Iz All I Do" by OptiMystic MC (feat. Sticky Fingaz, Sickflo, Mic Handz) from OptiMystic MC — Salty Waterz 2
- 2020: "King Me" by Grazza (feat. Sticky Fingaz)
- 2021: "The HAND" by DNT UncontaineD (feat. Sticky Fingaz)
- 2021: "Rolling 110 Deep" by DJ Kay Slay from DJ Kay Slay — Accolades
- 2021: "THIS" by Taiyamo Denku (feat. Sticky Fingaz & Sonny Seeza) from Taiyamo Denku — Hip-Hop Or Death
- 2021: "Fearless" by Irv Da God, Sticky Fingaz & Bizkit
- 2021: "Death Smile" by M7ofatc (feat. Sticky Fingaz)
- 2021: "Bullets Go" by Krazy K (feat. Sticky Fingaz & Grip)
- 2021: "Buffoonery" by Dope D.O.D. (feat. Sticky Fingaz) from Dope D.O.D. & ChuBeats — The Whole Planet Shifted
- 2022: "Had to Be Done" by Milez Grimez (feat. Sticky Fingaz) from Milez Grimez — Milezstone
- 2022: "Shotz Fired" by OptiMystic MC (feat. Sticky Fingaz) from OptiMystic MC Hip-Hop Temperament (EP)
- 2022: "Disrespect" by Fieldhouse & Myster DL (feat. Sticky Fingaz)
- 2022: "Time is Up" by Sticky Fingaz, Realio Sparkzwell, DJ Audas & Left Lane Didon from DJ Audas — 100 Mad Presents: Oros Tape, Vol. 1
- 2022: "From the Barrio" by Sticky Fingaz, Jesuly, Capaz Hernandez, Matiah Chinaski & DJ Audas from DJ Audas — 100 Mad Presents: Oros Tape, Vol. 1
- 2022: "Killah Copz" by Zangrenegra & Sticky Fingaz
- 2023: "Soul of Every Rapper" by Amadeus 360 the Beat King (feat. Sticky Fingaz) from Amadeus 360 the Beat King — The MPC Jedi
- 2023: "Katastrophic" by Kurt Dog & Sticky Fingaz
- 2023: "Destiny" by Annakin Slayd (feat. Sticky Fingaz & Inspectah Deck)
- 2023: "Rolling 200 Deep XIV" by DJ Kay Slay (feat. Sticky Fingaz, Paula Perry, Tah Mel, Da Inphamus Amadeuz, Cortez Bodega, Superstar Floss, Innocent, MC TNT, Tracey Lee, Aobie, Kurtis Blow & Suits TM) from DJ Kay Slay — Rolling 200 Deep
- 2024: "Mad House" by Mr. Peter Parker, Cory Gunz & Sticky Fingaz (feat. King Ilabash)
- 2024: "Flow Phenomenal" by Bloodshot & Sticky Fingaz

== Music videos ==
- 2000: "Get It Up" | Directed by Marc Klasfeld
- 2003: "Can't Call It" | Directed by George Yamamoto
- 2008: "Debo The Game" | Directed by Kevin Johnson
- 2011: "The Whole Damn New York" (a.k.a. "You Don't Know Me") | Directed by Sticky Fingaz & Myster DL
- 2012: "Rap Starr" (feat. Heidi Marie) | Directed by Sticky Fingaz
- 2016: "Celebrate Life" (feat. Just Gii) | Directed by Teddy Knock and Sticky Fingaz
- 2017: "Made Me" (feat. Cassidy) | Directed by Sticky Fingaz
- 2018: "Change My Life" | Directed by Sticky Fingaz
- 2018: "New York Niguhz In Hollywood" (feat. N.O.R.E.) | Directed by Sticky Fingaz
- 2018: "Put Your Fingaz Up" | Directed by Sticky Fingaz
- 2018: "S.T.F.U." (feat. Fredro Starr, M.O.P.) | Directed by Sticky Fingaz
- 2018: "S.T.F.U." (feat. Fredro Starr, M.O.P.) (Clean Version) | Directed by Sticky Fingaz
- 2019: "Bucket List" | Directed by Sticky Fingaz
- 2019: "Domestic Violence" (feat. Bubba Smiff) | Directed by Sticky Fingaz
- 2019: "Maybe I’m A Hater" | Directed by Sticky Fingaz
- 2021: "Fearless" by Irv Da God, Sticky Fingaz & Bizkit | Directed by Sticky Fingaz
- 2023: "Soul of Every Rapper" by Amadeus 360 the Beat King (feat. Sticky Fingaz) | Directed by Sticky Fingaz
- 2023: "Blink" | Directed by Sticky Fingaz
- 2023: "Tell 'Em" (video teaser) | Directed by Sticky Fingaz
- 2024: "Bac On My Shit" (video teaser) | Directed by Sticky Fingaz
