= Fredro Starr discography =

Discography

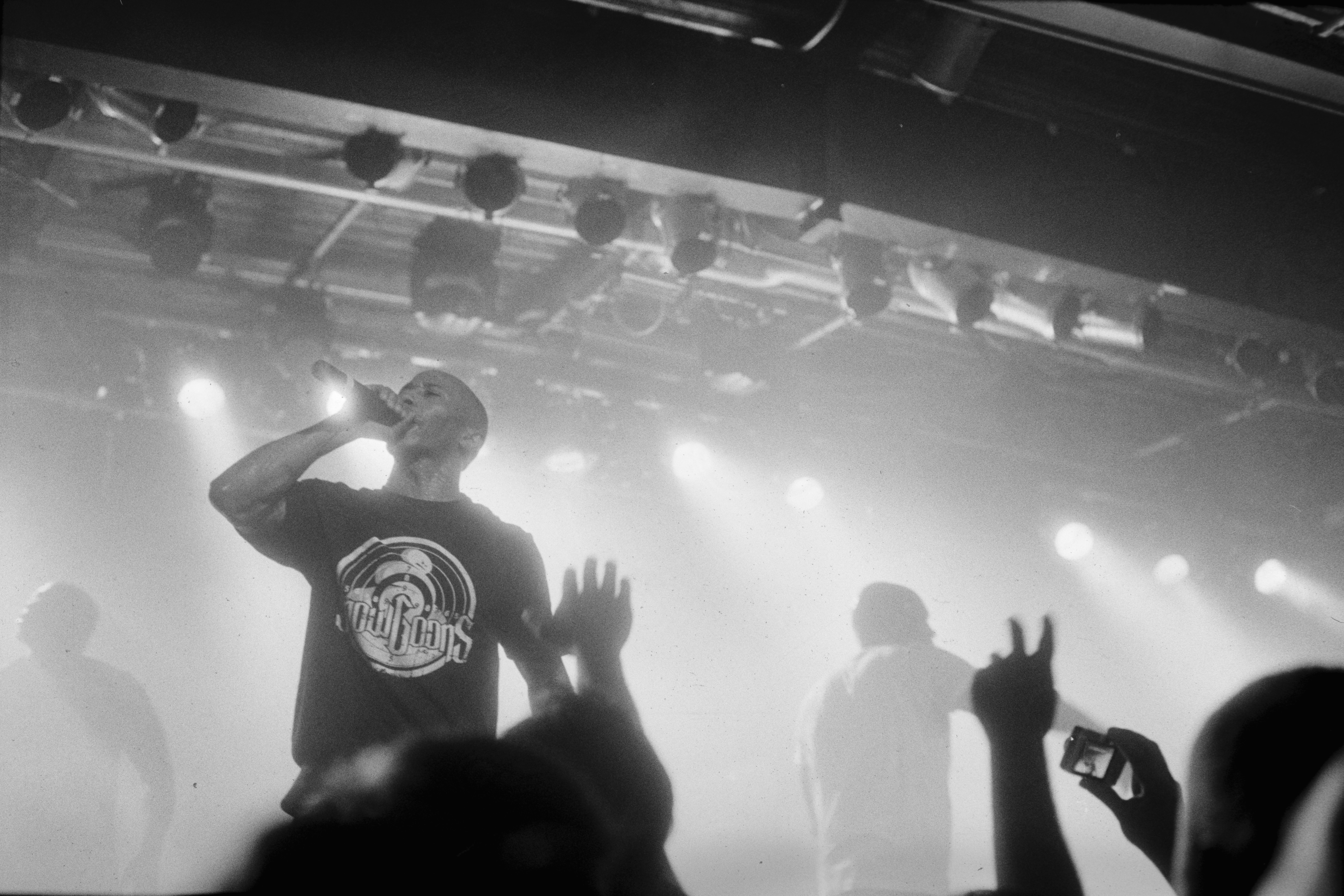
- Fredro Starr at a concert in München (2014)
- Studio albums: 7
- Soundtrack albums: 4
- Compilation albums: 6
- Singles: 23
- Music videos: 30

The discography of American hardcore rapper, record producer, actor and author Fredro Starr, best known as a member of multi-platinum hardcore rap group Onyx, consists of 7 solo studio albums, 3 EPs, 6 compilation albums, 4 soundtrack albums, 23 singles.

In 1984, Fredro Starr started as a breakdancer, he goes by the name Magic. In late 1985 Fredro Starr decided to become a street poet under the name Kool Fredro. In 1988, after graduating from school at the age of 17, Fredro Starr created the rap group Onyx along with his schoolmates Big DS and Suavé (also known as Sonny Seeza). In 1991, Fredro Starr was discovered by Jam Master Jay of Run-D.M.C. who signed Onyx on his legendary label JMJ Records. In the same year Sticky Fingaz joined the group. Onyx went on to release three top selling albums before Fredro began his solo career. As a part of Onyx, Fredro Starr was nominated as "Rap/Hip-Hop New Artist" on American Music Awards and won "Best Rap Album" on Soul Train Music Awards.

== Albums ==
=== Studio albums ===
List of albums, with selected chart positions, sales figures and certifications
| Title | Album details | Peak chart positions | |
| Title | Album details | (United States) Billboard 200 | (United States) Top R&B/Hip-Hop Albums |
|---|---|---|---|
| Firestarr | Released: February 13, 2001; Label: Koch Records; Formats: CD, MD, LP | 76 | 18 |
| Don't Get Mad Get Money | Released: May 20, 2003; Label: D3 Entertainment; Formats: CD, MD, LP | — | 99 |
| Made In The Streets | Released: December 25, 2013; Label: Mad Money Movement, Goon MuSick; Formats: MD, CD | — | — |
| Firestarr 2 | Released: March 9, 2018; Label: Mad Money Movement; Formats: MD | — | — |
| Jazz | Released: November 4, 2022; Label: 100 Mad; Formats: MD | — | — |
| Legends Corner | Released: November 17, 2023; Label: 100 Mad; Formats: MD | — | — |
| Soul | Released: January 10, 2025; Label: 100 Mad; Formats: MD | — | — |

=== Extended plays ===
| Title | EP details |
|---|---|
| A Few Joints (EP) | Released: March 1, 2021; Label: Onyx |
| 6lunt 6rothers (EP) (with 6ambu Starr) | Released: September 7, 2021; Label: 100 Mad |
| 6lunt 6rothers, Vol. 2 (EP) (with 6ambu Starr) | Released: May 20, 2024; Label: 100 Mad |

=== Compilation albums ===
| Title | Compilation details |
|---|---|
| Soul On Fire | Released: January 1, 2021; Label: Mad Money Movement |
| Stash Box | Released: May 9, 2021; Label: Onyx |
| 16 Bars Wit Firestarr | Released: May 15, 2021; Label: Onyx |
| Real Rap Wit Fredro Starr | Released: July 31, 2021; Label: Onyx |
| Beats By Dro, Vol. 1 | Released: December 8, 2023; Label: 100 Mad |
| Beats By Dro, Vol. 2 | Released: March 28, 2025; Label: 100 Mad |

=== Mixtapes ===
Fredro Starr's mixtapes and details
| Title | Mixtape details |
|---|---|
| Firestarr (Mix-Tape) (Hosted & Mixed by DJ Clue) | Released: 2000; Label: Koch Records |
| Live 4ever Die 2day | Released: May 13, 2013; Label: Mad Money Movement |

=== Albums as a producer ===
- October 24, 1995: Onyx — All We Got Iz Us (produced by Fredro Starr, Sticky Fingaz, Sonee Seeza, 8-Off Assassin)
- September 2, 2022: Phenam — Presto (EP) (produced by Fredro Starr)
- September 23, 2022: Smoovth — Project Near You (produced by Fredro Starr)
- June 28, 2024: UFO Fev — Strapped (produced by Fredro Starr)
- February 14, 2025: JD Era — Yellow Goose (produced by Fredro Starr)
- February 28, 2025: Jay Nice — Flairstarr (produced by Fredro Starr)

=== Soundtrack albums ===
- November 9, 1999: Light It Up
- December 19, 2000: Save the Last Dance
- July 14, 2009: A Day in the Life
- July 2, 2018: China Salesman (Music Inspired from the Motion Picture)

== Singles ==
=== As lead artist ===
List of singles, with selected chart positions, showing year released and album name
| Title | Year | Peak chart positions | | | Album |
| Title | Year | (United States) Billboard Hot 100 | (United States) Hot R&B/Hip-Hop Songs | (United States) Hot Rap Tracks | Album |
|---|---|---|---|---|---|
| 2000 | "Shining Through (Theme from Save the Last Dance)" (featuring Jill Scott) | — | — | — | Save the Last Dance: Soundtrack |
| 2000 | "Dying For Rap" | — | — | — | Firestarr |
| 2000 | "Dat B Dem / Dying For Rap" | — | — | — | Firestarr |
| 2001 | "Perfect Chick" | — | — | — | Firestarr |
| 2003 | "California Girls" | — | — | — | Don't Get Mad Get Money |
| 2013 | "Holdin' It Down" | — | — | — | Made In The Streets |
| 2013 | "That New York" | — | — | — | Made In The Streets |
| 2013 | "Made In The Streets RMX" | — | — | — | Made In The Streets |
| 2013 | "Ain't No Other Kings" | — | — | — | Made In The Streets |
| 2013 | "Everyday Hell" | — | — | — | Made In The Streets |
| 2013 | "What If 2" | — | — | — | Firestarr 2 |
| 2014 | "No Design To This" | — | — | — | |
| 2018 | "Do U Know" | — | — | — | Firestarr 2 |
| 2018 | "Invasion Of The Body Catchers" | — | — | — | |
| 2020 | "Corona Freestyle" | — | — | — | |
| 2021 | "Onyx OG" (Fredro Starr & 6ambu Starr) | — | — | — | 6lunt 6rothers (EP) (with 6ambu Starr) |
| 2021 | "Down Like That" | — | — | — | Legends Corner |
| 2021 | "Main Squeeze" (feat. Jacob G) | — | — | — | Legends Corner |
| 2022 | "Fire Payne" (feat. RJ Payne) | — | — | — | Legends Corner |
| 2023 | "Not for the Weak" (Jody Larenz & Fredro Starr) | — | — | — | |
| 2023 | "Polo Assassins" (Fredro Starr, Ras Kass & Vincent Pryce) | — | — | — | |
| 2024 | "Come And Get This Money" (Fredro Starr, 5ive Mics & Diddy Bop da Boss) | — | — | — | |
| 2025 | "Hood Jealousy" | — | — | — | Soul |
| 2025 | "Back in Reverse" (feat. Big Al) | — | — | — | Soul |

=== As lead artist (Free singles) ===
- 2003: "So Called Beef (50 Cent Diss)"
- 2004: "Thug Love"
- 2004: "Wifey" (No Chorus Demo)
- 2008: "Heaven Records"
- 2008: "No He Didn't"
- 2009: "Blood (a.k.a. Rahs Wake)"

== Guest appearances ==
- 1998: "Xtreme" All City - Metropolis Gold
- 1999: "Ghetto's a Battlefield" Blaze - Light It Up (soundtrack)
- 1999: "Serious Shit"Blaze Da Golden Jaw - Next Year / Serious Shit / Dual Action
- 2001: "Get It Up" Sticky Fingaz - Blacktrash: The Autobiography of Kirk Jones
- 2001: "Don't Be Afraid" Jerzey Mob - Outlawz Present Jerzey Mob Vol. 1
- 2003: "I Don't Know" Sticky Fingaz - Decade: "...but wait it gets worse"
- 2004: "Smoke As Life" Grandmasta Vic feat. Fredro Starr & Mr Cheeks)
- 2006: "Ride For The Block" Various Artists - Straight Out Da Hood
- 2008: "The Greatest" Ruler Divine feat. Fredro Starr, Mr. Cheeks
- 2009: "International Thug" Mal Da Udal - International Thug
- 2009: "Vodka Rap" Mal Da Udal - International Thug
- 2009: "Queens - Ростов" Песочные Люди (feat. Fredro Starr & БТР) - Сухое Горючее
- 2009: "Black Bagz (100MAD Anthem Remix)" Chi King, Planet Asia, Fredro Starr & I$aid
- 2009: "100 Mad Gang (Slam Again)" Skotadistes (Greece) feat. Fredro Starr
- 2009: "Can You Hear Me" Various Artists (Detroit Diamonds, Fredro Starr & Sticky Fingaz) - A Day In the Life (The Soundtrack)
- 2009: "Mexican Standoff" Various Artists (Fredro Starr, Michael K. Williams & Sticky Fingaz) - A Day In the Life (The Soundtrack)
- 2009: "The Setup #2" Various Artists (Fredro Starr, Malik Barnhardt, Melinda Santiago, Mezmo, Sticky Fingaz & Tony Hussle) - A Day In the Life (The Soundtrack)
- 2009: "The Assassination" Various Artists (Bokeem Woodbine, Fredro Starr & Hassan Johnson) - A Day In the Life (The Soundtrack)
- 2009: "Can't Live Forever" Various Artists (Bokeem Woodbine, Fredro Starr & Keith Robinson) - A Day In the Life (The Soundtrack)
- 2009: "The Airport" Various Artists (Bokeem Woodbine, Faizon Love, Fredro Starr, Melinda Santiago, Michael Rapaport, Sticky Fingaz & Tyrin Turner) - A Day In the Life (The Soundtrack)
- 2010: "Queens - Ростов" [Capella (За Полк) Remix] Песочные Люди (feat. Fredro Starr & Смоки Мо) - Горючая Смесь (Альбом Ремиксов)
- 2010: "Queens - Ростов" [DJ Superman] Песочные Люди (feat. Fredro Starr) - Горючая Смесь (Альбом Ремиксов)
- 2010: "Hustle101" Roc C – Scapegoat
- 2010: "Time Is Money" Ese Lonely (feat. Chi King & Fredro Starr) - Time Is Money
- 2010: "Time Is Money" Stranga The Great (feat. Chi King & Fredro Starr) - Time Is Money
- 2010: "Multy" Chi-King - The Big Heist
- 2010: "100MAD Anthem" Rah Bigalow - Bigalow Doctrine Part II Ruff
- 2010: "Nobody Fear You" I$aid feat. Fredro Starr and Chi King
- 2011: "Time Is Money" Stranga The Great (feat. Chi King, Fredro Starr, 12 O' Clock, and Illwerd) - Time Is Money
- 2011: "That's Us" Rah Bigalow (feat. Fredro Starr, Snak The Ripper & Chi King) - The Wack Rapper Assassinator
- 2011: "Knuckle Up" Milez Grimez Ft. Fredro Starr & Rock (Of Heltah Skeltah)
- 2011: "Celebrate" Fredro Starr & Layzie Bone - Fire Squad [EP]
- 2011: "Fire Squad" Fredro Starr & Layzie Bone - Fire Squad [EP]
- 2011: "Going In For The Kill" Fredro Starr & Layzie Bone - Fire Squad [EP]
- 2011: "SMASHIN'" W.d.B.m. (Jay Monaco & Ray Ray Intl) feat. Fredro Starr
- 2011: "SMASHIN'" (Italian Remix) W.d.B.m. (Jay Monaco & Ray Ray Intl) feat. Fredro Starr & Duke Montana
- 2012: "Turn Da Heat Up" Krazy Drayz (of Das EFX) - Showtime
- 2012: "The Legacy" Snowgoons ft. Esoteric, Ill Bill, Godilla, Fredro Starr (of Onyx), Sicknature, Punchline, Reks, Thirstin Howl the 3rd, Planetary (of Outerspace, Virtuoso, Maylay Sparks, Swann, Sav Killz, M-Dot & Reef The Lost Cauze - Snowgoons Dynasty
- 2012: "100MadSouth" B-HI
- 2012: "My Purpose" Young Noble - Outlaw Rydahz Vol. 1
- 2012: "Wie die Zeit vergeht" Eko Fresh - Ek to the Roots
- 2012: "Everybody Wins" T.O.B. - תהילה
- 2013: "Panic Room" Dope D.O.D. - Da Roach
- 2013: "Laughing To The Bank" J. Thaddeus - The Disgruntled Gentleman
- 2013: "Reality Rap" Skripture - Still Standing
- 2014: "My Brother's Keeper" Young Noble & Hussein Fatal of Outlawz, Sticky Fingaz & DJ Kay Slay - Outlaw Nation Vol. 4
- 2014: "Unholy" Reks (feat. Fredro Starr & Ruste Juxx) - Eyes Watching God
- 2015: "Kill 'em All" Merkules - Scars
- 2015: "Till" Mic Check feat. Fredro Starr & Hason - Str8Biz Legendz - EP
- 2015: "Goonavision" Savage Brothers - Freedom Or Death
- 2016: "LuCypher" by Reel Wolf (feat. Fredro Starr, Ghettosocks, Sars, Kid Fade, Sean Strange, Swifty Mcvay & DJ Tmb) from Reel Wolf The Underworld 2
- 2016: "Greca (cold world)" by Nigheddò Awamakers (feat. Fredro Starr) from Nigheddò Awamakers Retròvirus
- 2016: "Nasty's World" by A$AP Mob (feat. A$AP Nast & Fredro Starr) from A$AP Mob Cozy Tapes, Volume 1
- 2016: "Team Death Match" by Snowgoons (feat. Diabolic, Chino XL, Lil' Fame, Fredro Starr & Justin Tyme) from Snowgoons Goon Bap
- 2017: "Bamboo Skit" by A$AP Twelvyy (feat. Fredro Starr) from A$AP Twelvyy 12
- 2017: "The War" by Alphamale (feat. Fredro Starr) from Alphamale The Battleground
- 2017: "Journey" by Larceny (feat. Fredro Starr & Metaphorz) from Larceny The Last Boyscout
- 2017: "Journey [Remix]" by Larceny (feat. Fredro Starr & Metaphorz)
- 2018: "Tomorrow Ain't Promised" by Evante & Fredro Starr from China Salesman (Music Inspired from the Motion Picture)
- 2018: "Running from Reality" by OptiMystic MC (feat. Kali Ranks, Rampage & Fredro Starr) from OptiMystic MC Salty Waterz
- 2018: "Still Fakin' The Funk" by Neek The Exotic (feat. Fredro Starr) from Neek The Exotic Hell Up In Queens
- 2018: "Wreck Boulevard" by NiCE Supreme (feat. Fredro Starr) from NiCE Supreme Loud Pack From Paris (EP)
- 2020: "Reparations" by N.B.S. & Snowgoons (feat. Fredro Starr) from N.B.S. & Snowgoons — Still Trapped In America
- 2020: "Get 'em' by OptiMystic MC (feat Fredro Starr, MDMC & Sickflo) from OptiMystic MC — Salty Waterz 2
- 2021: "Rolling 110 Deep" by DJ Kay Slay from DJ Kay Slay — Accolades
- 2021: "Follow My Lead" by Taiyamo Denku (feat. Fredro Starr) from Taiyamo Denku — Hip-Hop Or Death
- 2021: "Dat Cloth" by Outlawz (feat. Supreme C, Fredro Starr, Kxng Crooked) from Outlawz — One Nation
- 2021: "Cold Summer" by Dope D.O.D. (feat. Fredro Starr, Rook Da Ruckus, Willy Snypa & SickFlo) from Dope D.O.D. & ChuBeats — The Whole Planet Shifted
- 2022: "The 90’s Are Back Pt. 3" by Snowgoons (feat. Chi-Ali, Royal Flush, Nocturnal, Sadat X, D.V. Alias Khryst, Fredro Starr, Ali Vegas & Will Sully) from Snowgoons — Renaissance Kings
- 2022: "G’z Up" by V Knuckles (feat. Millyz & Fredro Starr) from V Knuckles (N.B.S.) — Winter Warfare
- 2022: "All We Know" by Fortunato (feat. Fredro Starr) (Produced by Snowgoons)
- 2022: "Ya’ Don’t Stop" by Fredro Starr, N.B.S. & DJ Audas from DJ Audas — 100 Mad Presents: Oros Tape, Vol. 1
- 2022: "187" by McGyver (feat. Fredro Starr) from McGyver — Camillionizm
- 2022: "Shut 'Em Down Again" by Termanology (feat. Fredro Starr) from Termanology — Determination
- 2022: "16 Bar Verse by Fredro Starr of Onyx" by Anno Domini
- 2023: "Metaverse" by Snowgoons (feat. Fredro Starr & DoItAll) from Snowgoons — 1st Of Da Month Vol. 2
- 2023: "White Noise" by Skits Vicious (feat. Fredro Starr) from Skits Vicious (Dope D.O.D.) — Nice Night For a Walk Volume 1
- 2023: "Mentality" by Meeco & DJ Access (feat. Lil Fame & Fredro Starr) from Meeco & DJ Access — We Run Shit
- 2023: "Squad with Me" by Gotham City Boys & Ricky Bats (feat. Fredro Starr, Rel Lyfe, Pop Burna, Smiley The Ghetto Child & Drew Wolf) from Gotham City Boys & Ricky Bats — Gotham City Boys
- 2023: "Los Angeles Times" by Jay NiCE (feat. Fredro Starr & Recognize Ali) from Jay NiCE — Rise & Shine
- 2023: "Fully Loaded" by V Knuckles & Phoniks (feat. Fredro Starr & Flash) from V Knuckles & Phoniks — The Next Chapter
- 2023: "Rolling 200 Deep XIII" by DJ Kay Slay (feat. Young Buck, 88 LO, Smooth B, King Malachi, Master Rob, Vita, Merkules, Nytro, Iron Sheikh, Bishop Lamont, Capitalist, Jade Diamonds, Sparky D & Fredro Starr) from DJ Kay Slay — Rolling 200 Deep
- 2024: "Box Office" by Hus Kingpin & 9th Wonder (feat. Fredro Starr) from Hus Kingpin & 9th Wonder — The Supergoat
- 2024: "Make The Boom Bap Great Again" by Lenwa Dura (feat. Fredro Starr, Johnny Mendoza, DJ See All) from Lenwa Dura El Hombre Tras La Rima

== Music videos ==
- 2001: "Dat Be Dem/Dyin For Rap" | Directed by Jeff Byrd
- 2001: "Perfect Chick" | Directed by Jeff Byrd
- 2003: "California Girls"
- 2012: "180 On The Dash" | Directed by David Tikva
- 2012: "All Or Nothing" (feat. Begetz) | Directed by David Tikva
- 2012: "February" | Directed by 416PRINCEBEATZ
- 2012: "Made In The Streets" | Directed by The Visionariez
- 2012: "Private Jet To Heaven" | Directed by David Tikva
- 2012: "Bout That / Die 2day" | Directed by Dave Manigault & Fredro Starr
- 2013: "Change Up / End Of The Day" | Directed by Dave Manigault & Fredro Starr
- 2013: "Lock and Key / Everything I Love" | Directed by Dave Manigault & Fredro Starr
- 2013: "U Make Me Flyer / Top Floor" | Directed by Dave Manigault & Fredro Starr
- 2013: "What If 2" (Original Video) | Directed by Andre Sigur & Only1RichHustle
- 2014: "What If 2" | Directed by JB Adkins
- 2014: "Everyday Hell" | Directed by JB Adkins
- 2014: "That New York" | Directed by Angel "OZ" Navarro
- 2014: "Polo Wars" | Directed by Angel "OZ" Navarro
- 2016: "The Truth" | Directed by Angel "OZ" Navarro
- 2018: "Firestarr 2" (Short Movie) | Directed by Fredro Starr and Michal Nemtuda | Edited by Boris Beharka
- 2018: "South America" | Directed by Fredro Starr and Pandora Films
- 2020: "Fuck Corona" | Directed by Fredro Starr
- 2021: "Onyx OG" (with 6ambu Starr) | Directed by Pinkall Productions
- 2021: "Down Like That" | Directed by Pinkall Productions
- 2022: "Heartbeat" (feat. Mac Mason) | Directed by Droneworks Ent
- 2022: "Electric Hummers" (feat. N.B.S.) | Directed by Droneworks Ent
- 2024: "Blunt Brothers" (with 6ambu Starr) (feat. Whosane) | Directed by Briese.Digital
- 2024: "#QGTM" (with 6ambu Starr) | Directed by Akin Fims
- 2025: "Hood Jealousy" | Directed by Akin Fims
- 2025: "Back in Reverse" | Directed by Akin Fims
- 2025: "Sailing To Get Fly" (with Ricky Bats and A.L.) | Directed by Sergio Parra
