= Made in the Streets =

Made in the Streets may refer to:

- Made in the Streets (charity), a Christian charitable and educational organization in Nairobi, Kenya
- Made in the Streets (album), a 2013 album by Fredro Starr
