= It's About T.I.M.E. =

Studio album by Sticky Fingaz
- Released: February 14, 2019
- Recorded: 2014–2018
- Genres: East Coast hip hop, hardcore hip hop
- Length: 49:17 (USB, iDitty card), 42:55 (LP), 22:19 (MD), 26:54 (Bonus tracks) (MD)
- Label: Major Independents
- Producer: Nottz Raw

Sticky Fingaz chronology
Decade: "...but wait it gets worse" (2003)	It's About T.I.M.E. (2019)

It's About T.I.M.E. is the third studio album by Onyx member Sticky Fingaz, released on February 14, 2019 through Major Independents. The album is available only on Sticky's own website.

The album was released as a "digital album movie" and is accompanied by musical film, which tells about the life of Sticky Fingaz, starting from his birth to the entry into Onyx. There are three young actors that play the evolution of a rapper. Sticky Fingaz not only wrote the script for this film, but also presented himself as a director, cinematographer and producer of the film, and also he played a role in it. All the music for the movie was created by Nottz Raw.

In March, after Fingaz responded to quotes from Kodak Black, his "digital album movie" became available on his website along with the diss track on Kodak, "Bust Down". In July, the album became available on the iDitty platform as an interactive souvenir card. Bonus tracks from the album were released on digital platforms on April 7, 2020, and the album itself was released on May 1. In 2020, the album will be released on vinyl.

== Plot and concept ==
The film tells the story of the life of an American rapper Sticky Fingaz, from the experience he gained in childhood, to his growing up and becoming a hip-hop icon. All this is accompanied by songs performed by the rapper himself. According to the director of the film, this movie can shake the art to the ground for many years.

The movie was shot in 2016 in Los Angeles, and partly in Dakar. The rapper himself says that the title of this release has a double meaning. First, he didn't release a solo album for so long, so now it's about time. Secondly, "T.I.M.E." is also an acronym for "The Illest Man Ever". This is the life story of Sticky Fingaz.

== Background ==
In November 2017, American rapper Sticky Fingaz, a member of the rap-group Onyx, published a cover and a link to pre-order his new album-movie titled It's About T.I.M.E.. At first, a teaser for the new movie was published, and then the trailer itself.

The release of the album-movie was continually delayed, but the interest in it was supported by the release of videos for songs which were added as bonus tracks to the new release: «Made Me» (feat. Cassidy), «Change My Life», «Ebenezer Scrooge» (feat. N.O.R.E.), «Put Your Fingaz Up», «S.T.F.U.» (feat. Onyx and M.O.P.).

Sticky Fingaz released a teaser on February 12, 2019, which was accompanied by the release date of the movie.

== USB flash drive ==
In April 2018, Sticky Fingaz demonstrated the media on which his album-movie will be released. This is USB flash drive, made in the form of a silicone finger authentic thumb of Sticky Fingaz. In this form album-movie was released in limited edition for collectors. This flash drive contains several bonus tracks, independent of the film, which were produced by Desmond "DSP" Powell and various other producers. Rap-groups Onyx and M.O.P., as well as rappers N.O.R.E., Cassidy, Kurupt and Vado took part in the recording of the songs. Each bonus track is also accompanied by a visual as well. The main song among them is a song called "Put Your Fingaz Up", because the video for this song is filmed with the most amazing visual technology of today: VR 360, which allows you to rotate the video image while watching it.

== Tracklist (soundtrack) ==
- "Pay Attention"
- "110373"
- "Never Was Born"
- "Just A Kid"
- "So Beautiful"
- "I'm A Teenager"
- "City Boy"
- "Run Away"
- "Until It Gets Dark"
- "Hunger Taught Me To Cook"

== Tracklist (bonus-tracks) ==
- "Put Your Fingaz Up" [Producer: Desmond "DSP" Powell & Sticky Fingaz]
- "Change My Life" [Producer: MaD LiON]
- "I'm A Hater" [Producer: Desmond "DSP" Powell & Sticky Fingaz]
- "S.T.F.U." (feat. ONYX and M.O.P.) [Producer: Tru .P]
- "Ebenezer Scrooge" (a.k.a. "New York Niguhz In Hollywood") (feat. N.O.R.E.) [Producer: Chyskillz]
- "Made Me This Way" (feat. Cassidy) [Producer: Desmond "DSP" Powell & Sticky Fingaz]
- "Blue" (feat. Kurupt) [Producer: Desmond "DSP" Powell & Sticky Fingaz]
- "Bucket List" (feat. Desmond "DSP" Powell) [Producer: Desmond "DSP" Powell & Sticky Fingaz]

== Cast ==
Actor	Character
Sticky Fingaz	Himself
Malik Sinegal	Sticky Fingaz at the age of 15 years
Just Gii	Herself
