= Firestarr =

Studio album by Fredro Starr
- Released: February 13, 2001
- Recorded: 1999–2000
- Studios: OPM Studios (Los Angeles, California), Studio 76 (Cleveland, Ohio) ("I Don't Wanna...")
- Genres: East Coast hip hop Hardcore hip hop
- Length: 55:18
- Label: Koch Records
- Producers: Fredro Starr, DaVinci, Ant Beats, Omar "Iceman" Sharif (exec.)

Fredro Starr chronology
Firestarr (2001)	Don't Get Mad Get Money (2003)

Singles from Firestarr
- 1. "Shining Through" Released: 2000; 2. "Dying For Rap" Released: 2000; 3. "Dat B Dem / Dying For Rap" Released: 2000; 4. "Perfect Chick" Released: 2001

Firestarr is the debut studio album by American hardcore rapper Fredro Starr, best known as a member of multi-platinum hardcore rap group Onyx, released on February 13, 2001 by Koch Records.

The album was produced by Fredro Starr, DaVinci and Ant Beats. The album was featured by members of the group Outlawz - E.D.I. Mean, Napoleon and Young Noble, as well as Sticky Fingaz, X1, Ice-T, Capone-N-Noreaga, Cuban Link, Aaron Hall and many others.

The album debuted at number 76 on the US Billboard 200, number 18 on the Top R&B/Hip Hop Albums chart and number 2 on the Top Independent Albums on March 3, 2001.

== Background ==
Onyx's front man, Fredro Starr, after leaving Def Jam, focused his attention on releasing a solo release. For this, he even had to move from New York to Los Angeles, where he met Omar "Iceman" Sharif, thanks to whom they came up with an idea of releasing a solo album on the independent label Koch Records. Later on the same label will be released the fourth album of Onyx, Bacdafucup: Part II. The result of Fredro Starr's effort was his debut album, Firestarr, consisting of 15 tracks.

== Recording and production ==
The album was recorded from 1999 to 2000 at OPM Studios in Hollywood (Los Angeles, California). And only one song "I Don't Wanna..." was recorded with singer Aaron Hall in 2000 at Studio 76 in Cleveland, Ohio. Most of the album was produced by Fredro Starr and DaVinci. Four tracks on the album were produced by Ant Beats.

== Releases ==
The Japanese edition of the album included one bonus track "V12 - Niggaz", which previously appeared on the compilation Race Riot in 2000 (July 18, 2000). The song "Dangerous" was recorded with Still Livin' special for this album, but later was released on the second album. The song "Thugz N My Killaz" was recorded with X1 and Begetz special for this album, but was unreleased. The song "Perfect Chick (Remix)" was released as a single and is a reference to the remix on the track "Me & My Bitch" by The Notorious B.I.G.

== Singles ==
Four singles from this album were released: "Shining Through" (Theme From "Save The Last Dance") (2000), "Dying For Rap" (2000), "Dat B Dem / Dying For Rap" (2000), "Perfect Chick" (2001). In support of the release of the album, two videos were filmed: "Dyin' 4 Rap / Dat Be Dem" and "Perfect Bitch".

== Critical response ==
Professional ratings
Review scores
Source	Rating
AllMusic	2.5/5 stars
RapReviews	6.0/10 stars
HipHopDX	3.5/5 stars
Vibe	2.0/5 stars
30Rap.com	3.5/5 stars

Jon Azpiri of AllMusic gave the album two and a half stars out of five, saying "...With his signature rapping style, former Onyx frontman Fredro Starr creates an impressive solo album that features enough party tracks to keep Onyx fans happy while also offering some deeper tracks that will appeal to a new audience. After appearing in several films and the television series Moesha, many have questioned Starr's street credibility, and he replies capably with hard tracks like 'Thug Warz'. Starr also shows a more pensive side on 'What If'. Unfortunately, the album is weighed down by too many guest appearances by unseasoned rappers like Mieva. Still, Firestarr is a solid reply to his critics and proof that, if given the chance, Fredro Starr can still shine."

Steve 'Flash' Juon of RapReviews gave the album six stars out of ten, and stated "...Fredro has moved a bit from his angrier and grittier Onyx style on this release. He still has the gruff, hardcore b-boy voice, and there are still energetic adrenaline laced songs like 'Dyin' 4 Rap' and 'Dat Be Dem'; but Fredro also shares his personal thoughts on life's mysteries with 'What If' and the struggles to survive with 'Shining Through.'"

HipHopDX gave the album three and a half stars out of five, stating "...Some of negative aspects to Fredro Starr's debut would be that the collabos are inconsistent and fall short from captivating the embodiment of the album. Polished Stars like Cuban Link, Capone-N-Noreaga and Ice-T only cause confusion to Firestarr. The musical production on cuts like Soldier and I Don't Wanna are not up to par and are puzzling edition to otherwise decent album."

Stefan Johannesberg of Laut.de negatively responded to the flow, lyrics and production of the album, saying: "...The predictable defeat. His flow is pleasantly unobtrusive, and the lyrics are not quite as bland as expected. Unfortunately the beats are only lower average. It dominate 08/15 synth sounds, which are underlaid with the commercial, hectic rhythms. 'What If', 'Perfect Bitch' and the remix of 'Save the last dance' quite acceptable songs can be found on 'Firestarr'. The 'What If' theme has already explained to us Q-Tip in the early nineties, but Fredro drops a few funny lines. The same applies to 'Perfect Bitch'. Here he makes his perfect wife from all known erotic stars of this planet. ('The ass of Jennifer Lopez, the breasts of Janet Jackson, etc.')."

== Track listing ==
#	Title	Performer(s)	Producer(s)	Length
01.	"Comin' At The Game"		Ant Beats	1:24
02.	"Dyin' 4 Rap"		Fredro Starr, DaVinci	3:24
03.	"What If"		Fredro Starr, DaVinci	4:36
04.	"Thug Warz"	Outlawz (E.D.I. Mean, Napoleon), Sticky Fingaz (backing vocals)	Fredro Starr, DaVinci	3:36
05.	"Perfect B!tch"		Ant Beats	3:23
06.	"Electric Ice"	X1, Mieva	Fredro Starr, DaVinci	2:47
07.	"Who F#!k Betta"		Fredro Starr, DaVinci	3:34
08.	"Big Shots"	Sin, Begetz (backing vocals)	Fredro Starr, DaVinci	3:29
09.	"Soldierz"	Sticky Fingaz, X1	Fredro Starr, DaVinci	4:08
10.	"One Night"	Begetz, Ice-T, Versatile, Mieva (backing vocals)	Ant Beats	3:13
11.	"Dat Be Dem"	Begetz (backing vocals)	Fredro Starr, DaVinci	3:53
12.	"Dyin' 4 Rap (Remix)"	Capone-N-Noreaga, Young Noble, Cuban Link	Fredro Starr, DaVinci; DJ Hectic (scratches)	3:46
13.	"I Don't Wanna..."	Aaron Hall	Fredro Starr, DaVinci	5:05
14.	"America's Most"		Ant Beats	1:20
15.	"Shining Through (Remix)"	Sunshine (backing vocals)	Fredro Starr, DaVinci; Hector Delgado (remix)	3:32

Bonus Track Japan Edition

#	Title	Performer(s)	Producer(s)	Length
16.	"V-12 Niggaz"	Sunshine (backing vocals)	DaVinci, Fredro Starr	4:00

== Personnel ==
Credits for Firestarr adapted from AllMusic and CD booklet.

- Fredro Starr — performer, vocals, producer, recording, mixing, sequencer
- E.D.I. Mean — guest artist
- Napoleon — guest artist
- Sticky Fingaz — guest artist, backing vocals
- X1 — guest artist
- Mieva — backing vocals
- Sin — guest artist
- David "Begetz" Cooper — guest artist, backing vocals, A&R
- Ice-T — guest artist
- Versatile — guest artist
- Capone — guest artist
- Noreaga — guest artist
- Capone-N-Noreaga — guest artist
- Cuban Link — guest artist
- Young Noble — guest artist
- Aaron Hall — guest artist
- Sunshine — guest artist
- DaVinci — producer
- Ant Banks — producer
- DJ Hectic — scratches
- Omar "Iceman" Sharif — executive producer, management
- Just — management
- Hector Delgado — recording, mixing, sequencer
- Mauly T. — recording ("I Don't Wanna...")
- Chris Gehringer — mastering
- Jonathan Mannion — photographer
- Jeff Chenault — art direction, design

== Charts ==
Chart (2001)	Peak position
US Billboard 200	76
US Top R&B/Hip-Hop Albums (Billboard)	18
US Independent Albums (Billboard)	2
