= Breaking Point (2009 film) =

- Directed by: Jeff Celentano
- Written by: Vincent Campanella
- Produced by: Jay Webb; Vincent Campanella; Robert Capelli Jr.
- Starring: Tom Berenger; Armand Assante; Busta Rhymes; Sticky Fingaz; Musetta Vander; Frankie Faison; Robert Capelli Jr.
- Cinematography: Emmanuel Vouniozos
- Edited by: Doug Crise; Ryan Folsey
- Music by: Pinar Toprak
- Production company: Evolving Productions
- Distributed by: Cinema Epoch
- Release date: December 4, 2009
- Running time: 97 minutes
- Country: United States
- Language: English

Breaking Point is a 2009 action-thriller film starring Tom Berenger, Busta Rhymes, Musetta Vander and Sticky Fingaz. It is directed by Jeff Celentano with a screenplay written by Vincent Campanella. The film was showcased in Cannes and was released theatrically on December 4, 2009.

== Plot summary ==
A troubled lawyer takes on a high profile murder case that forces him to come to terms with his own past.

== Cast ==
- Tom Berenger as Steven Luisi
- Busta Rhymes as Al Bowen
- Armand Assante as Marty Berlin
- Musetta Vander as Celia Hernandez
- Frankie Faison as Judge Green
- Sticky Fingaz as Richard Allen (as Kirk 'Sticky Fingaz' Jones)
- Curtiss Cook as Byron Young
- Jill Nicolini as Veronica Taylor
