= Don't Get Mad Get Money =

Studio album by Fredro Starr
- Released: May 20, 2003
- Recorded: 2000–2003
- Studios: OPM Studios (Los Angeles, California)
- Genres: East Coast hip hop; hardcore hip hop
- Length: 41:59
- Label: D3 Entertainment
- Producers: Kronic Tones; Porky; Fredro Starr; Hector Delgado; Ess

Fredro Starr chronology
Firestarr (2001)	Don't Get Mad Get Money (2003)	Made In The Streets (2013)

Singles from Don't Get Mad Get Money
- 1. "California Girls" Released: May 6, 2003

Don't Get Mad Get Money is a second studio album by American rapper Fredro Starr released on May 20, 2003 on D3 Entertainment.

The album was produced by Kronic Tones, Porky, Fredro Starr, Hector Delgado and Ess. The album features appearances by American rappers Sticky Fingaz, X1, Begetz, Still Livin', and Dirty Get-Inz.

The album debuted at number 99 on the US Top R&B/Hip Hop Albums chart on June 14, 2003.

The album was released on D3 Entertainment, owned by the label Riviera Entertainment.

== Critical response ==
Professional ratings
Review scores
Source	Rating
AllMusic	2.5/5 stars
Vibe	2.5/5 stars
RapReviews	7.0/10 stars
30Rap.com	3.5/5 stars

Donnie Kwak of Vibe gave the album two and a half stars out of five, saying "...After lukewarm responses to his solo debut, "Firestarr", and last year's forgettable Onyx reunion, "Bacdafucup Part II", Fredro Starr tries his hand at more radio friendly step-alongs on "Don't Get Mad Get Money". Songs like "Finer Things", with its Ashanti-like chorus, and "California Girls", which mimics the Neptunes down to the falsetto crooning on the hook, expose the overtly pop direction. Starr's flow, however, remains polished (along with protege Icarus's). But after the production retreads and the tired threats and punch lines, "Don't Get Mad... doesn't get even."

Steve 'Flash' Juon of RapReviews gave the album seven stars out of ten, and stated "...Last time around Fredro Starr tried to do his own production, but this time he wisely passes the torch to cats like Porky and Kronic Tones. Never heard of them? You'll get to know the latter from his Just Blaze/Kanye West style work on "Pranksta," his melodic grit on "All Out" featuring Sticky Fingaz and X1, the smoothed out title track and the ominous "Reaper's Anthem." Porky's work on "California Girls" shines, but he also handles the bouncy flute of "Finer Things" nicely and still blasts it out for the streets on "Timberlands," Fredro's free advertisement for his favorite kicks."

== Singles ==
The one and only single, "California Girls" featuring Dirty Get-inz and Felisa Marisol was released on May 6, 2003. The video shows some kind of party near the pool.

== Track listing ==
#	track	featured guest(s)	producer(s)	length
01.	"Man Up"	Dirty Get-Inz, X1	Kronic Tones	3:22
02.	"Dangerous"	Still Livin'	Ess	2:36
03.	"California Girls"	Dirty Get-Inz, Felisa Marisol	Porky	3:46
04.	"Rambo"	T Hussle	Kronic Tones	2:53
05.	"Finer Things"		Porky	2:44
06.	"Just Like That"		Kronic Tones	3:13
07.	"Yo Mike (Skit)"		Kronic Tones	1:22
08.	"Funtime"		Ess	3:41
9.	"All Out"	Begetz, Sticky Fingaz, X1	Kronic Tones	2:24
10.	"Timberlands"		Porky	3:33
11.	"Where's The Love"		Fredro Starr, Hector Delgado	3:02
12.	"Don't Get Mad, Get Money"	X1	Kronic Tones	2:46
13.	"Reaper's Anthem (Torque)"		Kronic Tones	2:41
14.	"California Girls (Remix)"	Dirty Get-Inz, Felisa Marisol	M3	3:56

== Personnel ==
Credits for Don't Get Mad Get Money adapted from AllMusic and CD booklet.

- Fredro Starr — performer, vocals, producer ("Where's The Love"), executive producer
- Sticky Fingaz — guest artist, executive producer
- X1 — guest artist
- David "Begetz" Cooper — guest artist
- Dirty Get-Inz — guest artist
- Still Livin' — backing vocals
- T Hussle — backing vocals
- Felisa Marisol — backing vocals
- Kronic Tones — producer
- Porky — producer
- Ess — producer
- Omar "Iceman" Sharif — executive producer
- Hector Delgado — recording, mixing, producer ("Where's The Love")
- Jonathan Mannion — photographer
- Debra Young — photographer
- Brian Porizek — art direction, design
- Aldy Damian — label direction
- M3 — remix

== Charts ==
Chart (2003)	Peak position
US Top R&B/Hip-Hop Albums (Billboard)	99
