= Firestarr 2 =

Album by Fredro Starr

Studio album by Fredro Starr
- Released: March 9, 2018
- Recorded: 2017–2018
- Studios: Steakhouse Recording Studios (Los Angeles, California)
- Genres: East Coast hip hop Hardcore hip hop
- Length: 35:01
- Label: Mad Money Movement UMG
- Producers: The Elite Producers, The Korruption, Paul Cabbin

Fredro Starr chronology
Made In The Streets (2013)	Firestarr 2 (2018)

Singles from Firestarr 2
- 1. "Do U Know" Released: February 26, 2018

Professional ratings
Review scores
Source	Rating
HipHop4Real	5.0/5 stars

Firestarr 2 is a fourth studio album by American hardcore rapper Fredro Starr, released on March 9, 2018, by Mad Money Movement. The album was released only on digital platforms.

The album was produced by American producers The Elite Producers, The Korruption and Paul Cabbin. The album features appearances by American rappers Vado, The Kid Daytona, Begetz, Ali Vegas, River, vocalist of the American rock band XO Stereo, Cooper Campbell, and French DJ Nelson.

== Background ==
In 2011, Fredro Starr announced via Twitter that he was working on the follow-up of his debut work. The album was due out in the summer of 2012, but later the release was postponed to the first half of 2013. In the end, the project was abandoned, as Fredro met producer The Audible Doctor. A few tracks recorded for the album "Firestarr 2" was featured on the mixtape "Live 4Ever, Die 2Day" (2013)

== Singles ==
The one and only single, "Do U Know" featuring Vado and The Kid Daytona was released, February 26, 2018. The single "What If 2" that was released in 2013 and was marked as the first single from the upcoming album "Firestarr 2" never got to this album.

== Videos ==
In November 2017, was filmed a short film "Firestarr 2" by Slovak film director Michal Nemtuda, by the script of Fredro Starr. The film shows one day from the life of Firestarr. The soundtrack to this movie is the studio album "Firestarr 2" by Fredro Starr. The music video "South America" was filmed in the beautiful city of Medellin, Colombia November 7, 2016 and was released on April 26, 2018. The music video for "Private Jet To Heaven" was released in 2012.

== Track listing ==
#	track	featured guest(s)	producer(s)	length
01.	"Passion and Pain"	DJ Nelson	The Elite Producers	1:56
02.	"Do U Know"	Vado, The Kid Daytona	Korruption Camp	3:18
03.	"Murder Mami"		Paul Cabbin	2:59
04.	"Everything Ain't 4 The Gram (Skit)"			0:13
05.	"Counting My Blessings"	Begetz	Paul Cabbin	3:01
06.	"Sipping Pyru"	Ali Vegas	Korruption Camp	4:29
07.	"Time Sit Still (Skit)"			0:09
08.	"100,000 Miles"	River	Korruption Camp	4:38
09.	"South America"		Korruption Camp	3:03
10.	"Hate 2 Lose"	Cooper Campbell	Paul Cabbin	3:57
11.	"Who Does That"		Paul Cabbin	2:56
12.	"Life Is A Movie (Skit)"			0:04
13.	"Private Jet 2 Heaven"		Paul Cabbin	4:18

== Personnel ==
Credits for Firestarr 2 adapted from back cover of release.

- Fredro Starr — performer, vocals, executive producer
- Omar "Iceman" Sharif — executive producer
- Sam Madill — recording, mixing, mastering
- Vado — guest artist
- The Kid Daytona — guest artist
- Begetz — guest artist
- Ali Vegas — guest artist
- River — guest artist
- Cooper Campbell — guest artist
- DJ Nelson — guest artist, scratches
- The Elite Producers — producer
- The Korruption — producer
- Paul Cabbin — producer
- Woah! Graphics — design
