= Made in the Streets (charity) =

Non-profit organization based in Kenya

Made in the Streets is a Christian charitable and educational organization that focuses on rescuing street children from the slums of Nairobi, Kenya. Made in the Streets provides basic education and job-skills training in a residential facility, as well as food and supplies to young people living on the streets. Along with these activities the program also provides ministry to the spiritual needs of street kids.

== History ==
Made in the Streets was started by Charles and Darlene Coulston in 1995. The current organizational structure dates back to 1999. Since that time, the Coulstons have served as advisors, with administrative leadership provided by native Kenyans. Manna International, a relief and development organization based in Redwood City, California, provided sponsorship until that organization closed in 2004.

== Branches ==
Made in The Streets Kenya offices are located in Kamulu, Nairobi.
