= Black Trash: The Autobiography of Kirk Jones =

Album by Sticky Fingaz

Studio album by Sticky Fingaz
- Released: May 22, 2001
- Recorded: 1998 – 2000
- Studios: Unique Studios, NYC; LoRider Studios, Englewood, NJ
- Genres: East Coast hip-hop; hardcore hip-hop; underground hip-hop
- Length: 70:51
- Label: Universal
- Producers: Bud'da; Rockwilder; DJ Scratch; Nottz; Chuckie Madness; Epitome; Joe Naughty; Shamello; Fran Lover; Spydaman; Damon Elliott; Big D Evans; Mike "Punch" Harper; Sticky Fingaz

Sticky Fingaz chronology
Black Trash: The Autobiography of Kirk Jones (2001)	Decade: "...but wait it gets worse" (2003)

Singles from Black Trash: The Autobiography of Kirk Jones
- 1. "Get It Up" Released: July 11, 2000; 2. "Come On" Released: February 2001; 3. "Ghetto" Released: April 2001; 4. "Baby Brother" Released: August 28, 2001

Black Trash: The Autobiography of Kirk Jones is the debut solo studio album by Onyx member Sticky Fingaz, released on May 22, 2001, by Universal Records. Scripted like a movie, the concept album portrays the fictional character Kirk Jones, a felon just released from prison who is now struggling to come to terms with life outside jail.

Black Trash was produced by several producers including Self, Bud'da, Rockwilder, DJ Scratch, Nottz, Damon Elliott and others. It features guest appearances from Onyx's affiliate X1, Black Child, Raekwon, Still Livin, Canibus, Rah Digga, Redman, Dave Hollister, Petey Pablo, Eminem, Fredro Starr (as Firestarr), actor Omar Epps and others.

The album debuted at number 44 on the US Billboard 200 and number 10 on the Top R&B/Hip Hop Albums chart.

== Background ==
In 1998, Sticky Fingaz planned to release a solo album on Def Jam, but due to the label underfunding the project in Sticky's eyes, only offering him $250,000, he announced plans to leave the label and release the album elsewhere. He filed bankruptcy to get out of his Def Jam agreement and left for Los Angeles, California, where he began working with Dr. Dre. The first song he recorded in California was "Remember Me?", which was originally supposed to be on Dr. Dre's 2001 album, but was eventually released on Eminem's third album The Marshall Mathers LP. While working with Dr. Dre, the two came up with the idea of making an album scripted like a movie. Sticky originally planned to sign a solo deal with Dr. Dre's Aftermath Entertainment, but when he returned to New York to sign his friend X1 to Universal Records, he also received an offer from Universal after they listened to his new material. Universal gave him a proposal of $800,000 to record a solo album, which Sticky agreed to.

...They were like "X1 is dope, but we want to sign you". And they gave me a proposal for $800,000. Dre had gone to Jimmy Iovine and told him that I wanted a million dollars, but Jimmy Iovine said he would only give me $500,000. [I] always wonder what would have happened if I had signed with Dre instead of Universal. But that $300,000 difference was the money that I used to buy my mother the first house that she ever owned in her entire life, so I would never change that. - Sticky Fingaz

== Recording and production ==
Sticky Fingaz wrote the entirety of the album to be scripted like a movie, telling the story of Kirk Jones, a fictionalised version of himself who has recently been released from prison and struggles to adjust to live in the outside world. All guest verses were written by Sticky Fingaz with adjustments made by the guest artists accordingly, except for Canibus who wrote all of his verses from scratch.

Fred Durst of nu metal band Limp Bizkit was originally supposed to appear on the song "What If I Was White", but refused after reading the lyrics. After Durst refused, Sticky Fingaz proposed the track to Eminem, who also initially refused to provide a verse, but agreed to perform the intro and hook. The original solo version of "What If I Was White" was included on a 1998 mixtape Street Sweepers Pt. 4 by DJ Kay Slay and Dazon.

Heavy metal group Slipknot were supposed to be on the album, with two songs being recorded during production; "End Of The World" featuring lead singer Corey Taylor and "Oh My God", a song recorded in Slipknot's signature heavy metal style.

The original version of the song "Wonderful World" was much different than the version that made it on to the album. It was changed heavily after the estate of Louis Armstrong expressed their distaste for Sticky's altered lyrics, which referenced drugs and violence. In response, Sticky Fingaz wrote a detailed letter asking for the song to be used, and they granted him permission under the condition he could not change a single word from the original version.

The song "Just Do It", produced and featuring Dr. Dre was recorded especially for this album, but did not make the final cut. It eventually appeared on the soundtrack for the John Singleton film, Baby Boy.

== Releases ==
An advanced copy of "Black Trash" which consisted of 34 tracks was released in November 2000 and contained some minor differences compared to the official release. "What If I Was White" did not yet feature Eminem's vocals, and there are several skits that do not exist on the final release. This version also contains a number of different song titles than the official release, and features the original unedited version of "Wonderful World".

Universal Records pushed the release of the album back four times due to excessive bootlegging. The first release date was scheduled for Halloween 2000, but was later postponed to November 21, 2000, and was again pushed back to February 2001, before finally being released on May 22, 2001.

Also, in September 2000, Universal Records released a CD promo sampler Scenes From The Album Black Trash (The Autobiography Of Kirk Jones) with seven snippet tracks from the album up to that point.

In 2001, Universal Records released a 12" vinyl promo sampler Selections From The Album Blacktrash: The Autobiography Of Kirk Jones (Clean Versions) with clean versions of six tracks from the album.

Sticky Fingaz played live tracks from the "Black Trash" album only in April 2001, when he was on tour with Royce Da 5'9" and Nelly.

== Critical response ==
Professional ratings
Review scores
Source	Rating
AllMusic	3/5 stars
HipHopDX	3.5/5 stars
NME	7/10
RapReviews	8.5/10
Rolling Stone	3/5 stars
The Source	4/5 stars
Uncut	4/5 stars
Vibe	3.5/5 stars

Black Trash: The Autobiography of Kirk Jones was met with generally positive reviews from music critics. Matt Conaway of AllMusic gave the album three stars out of five, saying "...Scripted to fit the silver screen, Black Trash chronicles the trials and tribulations of Kirk Jones, a down-on-his-luck knucklehead who always manages to find trouble. However, it is hard to feel sympathetic for the character, as he is a man who, through the course of this LP, shows little regard for human life, kills his best friend, beats his wife, and deserts his child. Black Trash is an emotional roller coaster that tackles the quintessential tale of good vs. evil."

J-23 of HipHopDX gave the album three and a half stars out of five, stating "...This album showed a lot more maturity than his Onyx showings. Sticky has the potential to be one of the best emcees in Hip Hop instead of just in gangsta rap."

Steve 'Flash' Juon of RapReviews gave the album eight and a half stars out of ten, and stated "...Despite the long delays, Sticky Fingaz' solo is INDEED worth the wait - and worth its weight in gold."

Neil Drumming of Vibe gave the album three and a half stars out of five, and wrote "...On his first solo album, an engaging fictional account of the life of an ex-con, Sticky finds balance between acting and rapping. Trash proves that Sticky Fingaz is a lot more thoughtful than he used to be. Even if he ain't mad anymore, at least he can still act like it."

Jermaine Hall of The Source gave the album four stars out of five, and commented "... This album, arguably hip-hop's most visual work of the new millenium, is a cinematic experience. Influenced by Hollywood's high-impact action scripts, Sticky puts together a 34-track production that stars Kirk Jones (his government name). And in spite of the lengthy player, Black Trash is a hip-hop treasure." (The Source Magazine, Issue #135 - December, 2000).

Kris Ex of Rolling Stone gave the album three stars out of five, and wrote "...[This] has some great moments....[It] manages to bring some new ideas and energy to the rap game." (Rolling Stone Magazine, Issue #862 - February 15, 2001, page 78).

Uncut gave the album four stars out of five, saying "...Kirk Jones' extraordinary LP merits reassessment: it runs the gamut from satiric outrage to gospel rapprochement..." (Uncut Magazine, Issue 51 - August 2001, page 112).

NME gave the album seven out of ten, and stated "...It had to happen. The frustrated actor/movie director within many a rapper couldn't be suppressed for much longer. Eventually, someone was going to come up with a grandiose, operatic, information-overload spectacle of a concept LP. And that's precisely what the former Onyx frontman Sticky Fingaz has done. All of which all adds up to magic realism, hip-hop style..." (NME Magazine, June 9, 2001, page 40).

Hao Nguyen of Stop The Break said "you're surprised at the level of depth and sincerity Sticky managed to muster."

== Retrospect ==
Magazine	Country	Article	Year	Rank
SensCritique	France	Hip Hop Concept Album	2013	*
The Word Is Bond	United States	Top 10 Hip Hop Concept Albums	2013	5
Complex	United States	7 Rap Concept Albums That Would Make Good Movies	2014	*
HotNewHipHop	United States	Top 10 Narrative-Driven Rap Albums	2016	*
RateYourMusic	United States	Top 25 Hip-Hop Concept Albums of All Time	2016	17
Vinyl Me, Please	United States	The 10 Best Hip-Hop Concept Albums To Own On Vinyl	2017	*
Hip Hop Golden Age	United States	Top 15 Hip Hop Concept Albums	2018	7

== Track listing ==
#	Title	Performer(s)	Producer(s)	Samples	Length
1	"Intro"	Sticky Fingaz		"Universal Pictures Fanfare" by Jerry Goldsmith	1:47
2	"Come On"	Intro/Hook: Sticky Fingaz; First/Second/Third verse: Sticky Fingaz	Self	"Oh Love" by Creative Source	4:26
3	"My Dogz Iz My Gunz"	Hook 1: Sticky Fingaz; Bridge 1/Bridge 2: Sticky Fingaz; First/Second verse: Sticky Fingaz; Hook 2: Black Child	Bud'da; Joe Naughty; Shamello		4:25
4	"Not Die'n"	First/Second verse: Sticky Fingaz; Hook: Sticky Fingaz	Self	"Beware Of The Man (With The Candy In His Hand)" by The Dramatics	2:21
5	"Kirk Jones Conscience"	Omar Epps; Skit: Sticky Fingaz		"Get Outta Yourself" by Rupert Holmes	1:37
6	"Money Talks"	Intro: Raekwon; First/Second/Third verse: Sticky Fingaz; Hook: Raekwon	Rockwilder		4:34
7	"Why"	First verse: Sticky Fingaz, Still Livin and X1; Hook: Still Livin; Second/Third verse: Sticky Fingaz, X1 and Narrator	DJ Scratch		4:57
8	"Oh My God"	Sticky Fingaz	Self, Sticky Fingaz	"Return From the Ashes Theme" by John Dankworth	4:26
9	"State vs. Kirk Jones"	First verse: Rah Digga, Canibus, Superb, Redman, Scarred 4 Life; Second verse: Rah Digga, Redman, Guess Who, Sticky Fingaz	Nottz		4:15
10	"Kirk Jones Conscience II"	Omar Epps		"Get Outta Yourself" by Rupert Holmes	0:48
11	"Baby Brother"	First / Second verse: Sticky Fingaz; Hook: Dave Hollister	DJ Scratch	"Say It Again" by Danny Pearson	5:40
12	"Cheatin'"	Intro: Sticky Fingaz; First/Second verse: Sticky Fingaz; Hook: Sticky Fingaz	Rockwilder		4:00
13	"What Chu Want"	Hook: Sticky Fingaz, X1; First Verse: X1; Second Verse: Sticky Fingaz	Bud'da, Chuckie Madness, Epitome, Shamello		4:15
14	"Ghetto"	Intro: Sticky Fingaz; Hook: Sticky Fingaz, Petey Pablo; First/Second verse: Sticky Fingaz	Bud'da, Fran Lover, Shamello, Spydaman		4:18
15	"What If I Was White"	Intro: Eminem, Sticky Fingaz; Hook: Eminem; First/Second/Third verse: Sticky Fingaz	Damon Elliott		4:33
16	"Sister I'm Sorry"	Intro: Sticky Fingaz, Choclatt; First/Second verse: Sticky Fingaz; Hook: Choclatt	Big D Evans, Sticky Fingaz		4:28
17	"Get It Up"	Intro: Fredro Starr; Hook: Sticky Fingaz, Fredro Starr; First/Second/Third verse: Sticky Fingaz	DJ Scratch	"Jackin for Beats" by Sticky Fingaz	3:59
18	"Kirk Jones Conscience III"	Omar Epps		"Get Outta Yourself" by Rupert Holmes	0:36
19	"Licken Off In Hip Hop"	Hook: Sticky Fingaz, Columbo the Shining Star; First/Second verse: Sticky Fingaz	Mike "Punch" Harper		4:15
20	"Wonderful World"	Sticky Fingaz	Big D Evans, Sticky Fingaz	"What a Wonderful World" by Louis Armstrong; "Incarcerated Scarfaces" by Raekwon	2:11

== Personnel ==
Credits for Blacktrash: The Autobiography of Kirk Jones adapted from AllMusic and CD booklet.

- Sticky Fingaz - performer/vocals/producer/executive producer/art direction/compiling/editing/sequencer/production manager
- Black Child - performer
- Raekwon - performer
- Still Livin - performer
- X1 - performer
- Canibus - performer
- Guess Who - performer
- Rah Digga - performer
- Redman - performer
- Scarred 4 Life - performer
- Superb - performer
- Dave Hollister - performer, vocals
- Petey Pablo - backing vocals
- Eminem - performer
- Choclatt - performer
- Firestarr - performer
- Columbo The Shining Star - performer
- Self - producer
- Rockwilder - producer
- DJ Scratch - producer
- Dominick "Nottz" Lamb - producer
- Buddah - producer
- Joe Naughty - producer
- Shamello - producer
- Chuckie Madness - producer
- Epitome - producer
- Fran Lover - producer
- Spyda Man - producer
- Damon Elliott - producer
- Big D Evans - producer
- Mike "Punch" Harper - producer
- Elaine Lee - A&R coordinator
- Dino Delvaille - A&R direction, executive producer
- Bento Design - art direction
- Sandy Brummels - art direction
- Tony Prendatt - compiling/editing/ mixing/sequencer/production manager
- Bento Design - design
- Andy Tavel Law Group - legal counsel
- Steve Lobel - management
- Mike Fossenkemper - mastering
- Ken "Duro" Ifill - mixing
- Brian Stanley - mixing
- Dave "Hard-Drive" Pensado - mixing
- Dave Guerrero - assistant mixing
- Rick Travali - mixing
- Tommy Uzzo - mixing
- John Eder - photographer
- Steve Eigner - engineer
- Omar Epps - voice actor

== Charts ==
=== Weekly charts ===
Chart (2001)	Peak position
US Billboard 200	44
US Top R&B/Hip-Hop Albums (Billboard)	10
UK Albums (Official Charts Company)	161

=== Singles chart positions ===
Year	Song	Chart positions	
Year	Song	US Hot Rap Singles (Billboard)	UK Singles (Official Charts Company)
2000	Get It Up	43	77
