= Made in the Streets (album) =

Studio album by Fredro Starr
- Released: December 25, 2013
- Recorded: 2012–2013
- Genres: East Coast hip hop Hardcore hip hop
- Length: 38:06
- Labels: Mad Money Movement; Goon MuSick
- Producer: The Audible Doctor

Fredro Starr chronology
Don't Get Mad Get Money (2003)	Made in the Streets (2013)	Firestarr 2 (2018)

Singles from Made In The Streets
- 1. "Holdin' It Down" Released: July 5, 2013; 2. "That New York" Released: July 25, 2013; 3. "Made In The Streets RMX" Released: August 15, 2013; 4. "Ain't No Other Kings" Released: August 22, 2013; 5. "Everyday Hell" Released: September 18, 2013

Professional ratings
Review scores
Source	Rating
RateYourMusic	3.11/5 stars
Sputnikmusic	4.0/5 stars
EyeKnowHipHop	5.0/5 stars
The Essence of Rap and Hip-Hop	4.25/5 stars

Made in the Streets is a third studio album by American hardcore rapper Fredro Starr, best known as a member of multi-platinum hardcore rap group Onyx, released on December 25, 2013, by Mad Money Movement. Album was released on CDs on the Snowgoons's label Goon MuSick after several months, on September 9, 2014.

The album was entirely produced by The Audible Doctor. The album features appearances by American rappers Makem Pay, Mike Raw, Philly Swain and French DJ Nelson.

== Background ==
It's been over 10 years since Fredro Starr of Onyx dropped his last solo album. In 2012 he hooked up with Brown Bag AllStars's producer The Audible Doctor, who provides sample-heavy beats for Fredro's cinematic street tales. At first they planned to release EP but then they have decided to turn the EP into a full-length album. The Audible Doctor produced all songs on an album. On that album Fredro and Doctor taking back their listeners to 1989.

== Relations with Drake ==
In 2010 Canadian rapper Drake mentioned Fredro Starr on his song "Light Up":

"...The shit feel like when Fredro Starr was in Sunset Park, stuntin' hard in his yellow goose."

In response to this Fredro samples Drake for his song "The Truth".

"...I mean yeah I respect him for that reason. He shout me out on his first album on a record with Jay Z, on the ‘Light Up’ record which was probably one of the hottest records on his first album. Sampling Drake on the Made In The Streets joint ‘The Truth’ was just an ode back to him. Like somebody giving you dap, I’m giving dap right back."

== Singles ==
The first single, "Holdin' It Down" featuring Makem Pay and DJ Nelson was released, July 5, 2013. The song features sampled vocals from the late great Big L

The second single, "That New York" was released, July 25, 2013. The video was directed by one of Fredro Starr's production partners, Angel OZ Navarro, and was filmed for one day with another video "Polo Wars". The video portrays the daily life of New York: dice game over grocery store, theft of gold chains on the street, graffiti on the walls, skyscrapers of New York, Manhattan Bridge.

The third single, "Made In The Streets RMX" was released, August 15, 2013. The title track, which gave the name to the whole album

The next single, "Ain't No Other Kings" featuring DJ Nelson was released, August 22, 2013. The song "Ain't No Other Kings" is not a response to Kendrick Lamar, the song is dedicated to The Notorious B.I.G. that's why Biggie sampled on this song.

The final single, "Everyday Hell" was released, September 18, 2013. The song features on "Grand Theft Audio V Mixtape". The video was shot by JB Adkins on Christmas Eve in some kind of tunnel in Los Angeles.

== Videos ==
The first video from the album entitled "Everyday Hell" was released on January 2, 2014. In July 2014, two more videos were shot by Angel OZ Navarro in New York: "That New York" and "Polo Wars" And the last video "The Truth" was released on December 11, 2016.

== Track listing ==
#	track	featured guest(s)	cuts	length
01.	"Everyday Hell"			3:34
02.	"That New York"			3:18
03.	"The Truth"			3:16
04.	"This Ain't My Day"			3:54
05.	"Holdin' It Down"	Makem Pay	DJ Nelson	3:28
06.	"Polo Wars"			2:48
07.	"What U Going Thru"			3:23
08.	"Racing"	Mike Raw		2:52
09.	"Suicide Queens"			2:55
10.	"Ain't No Other Kings"	DJ Nelson	DJ Nelson	3:06
11.	"Hit Man 4 Hire"	Philly Swain		2:27
12.	"Made In The Streets RMX"			3:04

== Personnel ==
Credits for Made In The Streets adapted from AllMusic and CD booklet.

- Fredro Starr — performer, vocals, executive producer
- Sam Madill — mixing, mastering, executive producer
- Makem Pay — guest artist
- Mike Raw — guest artist
- Philly Swain — guest artist
- DJ Nelson — guest artist, scratches
- The Audible Doctor — producer
- DJ Illegal — coordinator
- SirQLate — design
