= A Day in the Life (film) =

2009 film directed by Sticky Fingaz

- Directed by: Kirk "Sticky Fingaz" Jones
- Written by: Kirk "Sticky Fingaz" Jones
- Produced by: Peter Block; Keith Louis Brown; Jason Constantine; Sticky Fingaz; Mario Jones; Erik Voake
- Starring: Drena De Niro; Omar Epps; Kirk "Sticky Fingaz" Jones; Faizon Love; Mekhi Phifer; Michael Rapaport; Fredro Starr; Clarence Williams III; Michael K. Williams; Bokeem Woodbine
- Cinematography: Erik Voake
- Edited by: Michael McReynolds; Jon Schnepp
- Music by: Kirk "Sticky Fingaz" Jones; Shelton "Ess Man" Rivers
- Production companies: Major Independents; Lionsgate
- Distributed by: Major Independents; Lionsgate
- Release date: July 7, 2009
- Running time: 90 minutes
- Country: United States
- Language: English
- Budget: $3 million

A Day in the Life is a 2009 American musical crime film, written, directed by and starring Sticky Fingaz, released on July 7, 2009, by Major Independents and Lionsgate. The film tells about one day in the life of Sticky, the leader of the gang, who is trying to escape from criminal life. A Day in the Life contains no spoken dialogue. Instead, the actors rap all their lines over a hip-hop beat.

The main role in the film was played by Sticky Fingaz. He also wrote the script and presented himself as a producer and composer of the film. The film co-stars Bokeem Woodbine, Michael Rapaport, Omar Epps, Mekhi Phifer and rappers Fredro Starr, Kurupt and Treach from the rap-group Naughty By Nature. It's the last film appearance of Lamont Bentley who died in a car accident four years earlier. It is also the final film appearance of Michael Taliferro who died of a stroke in 2006.

== Plot ==
Sticky Fingaz plays a main role in a rap musical about gangster that gets caught up in a bloody war between two criminal families. When the Black's family attacks a crack house and kills its people, Sticky is forced to choose between retreat and revenge, which may involve him in a vicious circle of violence.

== Cast ==
- Sticky Fingaz as "Sticky"
- Fredro Starr as "Phya"
- Bokeem Woodbine as "Bam-Bam"
- Mekhi Phifer as "King Khi"
- Michael Rapaport as Detective Grant
- Tyrin Turner as Detective Lou
- Omar Epps as "O"
- Faizon Love as Ike "Black Ike" Smith
- Drena De Niro as "P"
- Kurupt as "Murder"
- Melinda Santiago as "Heaven"
- Michael Kenneth Williams as Mike "Killer Mike"
- Omar "Iceman" Sharif as Ose
- Anthony "Treach" Criss as "Armor"
- Shelton "Ess Man" Rivers as Barry Grey
- Steve Lobel as "Hawk"
- X1 as "Nex"
- Ray J as Pinky
- Nadine Velazquez as Special Agent Natasha
- Troy Garity as Officer Klute
- Tony Curran as Dr. Reynolds
- Clarence Williams III as Sam
- Darris Love as "No Love"

== Production ==
The film was made in the rap opera genre and was filmed in Los Angeles in 2003, that's when Sticky Fingaz first mentioned this film in the press in an interview for the MVRemix portal.

"... My next album is called 'A Day In The Life Of Sticky Fingaz'. The whole thing is almost like 'Black Trash', like a story where the whole thing connects but each song makes sense and stands alone by itself. The whole thing is one day... It's not even an album... You'll be able to play it or watch it or do both simultaneously as the songs go. It's almost like a hip-hop Broadway play. It will be a new age in music."

In 2007, in an interview for The A-List Magazine, the director figuratively described the plot of the film as a story in which "The Godfather" meets "Romeo and Juliet". In the same year, in an interview based on fan questions from the Onyx website's forum, Sticky Fingaz called his film "Shakespearean rap opera".

"... I'm going to sharply change the game. I have a film in which I am a director and I play a main role, it's called "A Day In The Life". It's like a Shakespearean rap opera, I still don't know which genre to assign to it. I will be the first person to show my album in cinemas. Now all the music will be visual. Do you know how cinema has less impact without inserted music? This is the opposite. Music is less effective without visuals. I am going to change this situation."

In 2008, in an interview for the portal RapReviews, Sticky Fingaz referred to the new film as a movie built on rap: "A Day In The Life – basically it's Black Trash, the Kirk Jones album, on steroids. The whole entire movie is a wrap. There are no regular parts in the movie at all, all the dialogue is in rap."

== Release ==
The film premiered on July 2, 2009, in West Hollywood, California. The film was released on DVD 5 days later, on July 7, 2009. In Russia, the film was released on DVD by the company Mysteriya Zvuka on March 31, 2011. The Russian edition was accompanied by Russian subtitles.

In 2015, Sticky Fingaz released the film How To Make A Major Independent Movie in which he talked about how the film A Day In The Life was created: "When I started filming A Day In The Life I wanted to make film and describe the process I went through. That's how was created the documentary How To Make A Major Independent Movie, which provides behind-the-scenes tips and tricks to aspiring filmmakers, alongside words of advice from many others.

== Soundtrack ==
A Day In The Life: The Soundtrack

Soundtrack album by Various Artists
- Released: July 14, 2009 (iTunes) , August 18, 2009 (CD)
- Recorded: 2003
- Genres: Soundtrack, rap opera
- Length: 100:52
- Labels: Major Independents; Tommy Boy Records
- Producers: Kirk "Sticky Fingaz" Jones, Shelton "Ess Man" Rivers, Desmond "DSP" Powell

A Day In The Life: The Soundtrack is the official soundtrack to the 2009 movie of the same name, released digitally on July 14, 2009 by Major Independents and Tommy Boy Records. Physical CDs were released on August 18, 2009. The music for the film was produced by Shelton "Ess Man" Rivers and Kirk "Sticky Fingaz" Jones. The very first track, "Prologue", and 4 bonus tracks were produced by Desmond "DSP" Powell.

CD 1

No.	Title	Performers	Length
1.	"Prologue"	Ben Patrick, K.C. «Mezmo» Collins, Erik Palladino, Nadine Velazquez, Melinda Santiago, Drena De Niro, Bokeem Woodbine, Sticky Fingaz, Tony Curran, Faizon Love, Omar Epps, Michael K. Williams, Fredro Starr, Troy Garity, Michael Rapaport, Tyrin Turner, Mekhi Phifer, Clarence Williams III & Ryan Toby	2:49
2.	"Home Invasion #1"	Page Kennedy, Alvin Holland, K.C. «Mezmo» Collins, Steve Lobel, Veronica Gray & Ian «Blaze» Kelly	2:23
3.	"The Beach"	Sticky Fingaz, Melinda Santiago & Keith Robinson	2:26
4.	"The Pick Up"	Raymond «Detroit Diamonds» Wells & Sticky Fingaz	1:35
5.	"Can You Hear Me"	Sticky Fingaz, Fredro Starr, Raymond «Detroit Diamonds» Wells & Lamont Bentley	3:07
6.	"Mexican Standoff"	Sticky Fingaz, Michael K. Williams, Fredro Starr & James «730 Da Boss» Smith	2:54
7.	"The Car Chase"	Sticky Fingaz, Michael K. Williams, Ray J & Shorty Mack	2:08
8.	"The Setup #1"	Malik Barnhardt, Faizon Love, K.C. «Mezmo» Collins & Malinda Williams	3:09
9.	"Snitches"	Tyrin Turner, Michael Rapaport, Darren «Akten Up» Miller & Sticky Fingaz	2:57
10.	"The Setup #2"	Sticky Fingaz, Melinda Santiago, Malik Barnhardt, K.C. «Mezmo» Collins, Tony Hussle & Fredro Starr	1:19
11.	"Phya Is Shot"	Sticky Fingaz, Truth Hurts, Raymond «Detroit Diamonds» Wells & Tony Curran	1:56
12.	"Prego"	Melinda Santiago, Sticky Fingaz & Chocolatt	2:29
13.	"I Need Some Advice"	Josh Levien, Omar Epps & Sticky Fingaz	3:18
14.	"The Gun Dealer"	Treach, Sticky Fingaz & Omar «Iceman» Lindsey	2:48
15.	"Streets Ain’t Got No Love"	Gill Gayle, Erik Palladino, Nadine Velazquez, Jon Schnepp, Pat Alphonse, Chris Fleming & Sticky Fingaz	2:20
16.	"Gun Loader"	Bruce «X1» Sandlin, Omar «Iceman» Lindsey & Sticky Fingaz	1:09
17.	"Home Invasion #2"	Sticky Fingaz, Kurupt, James «730 Da Boss» Smith, Vilma Santiago, Toni Hunter & Lil' Zane	2:32
18.	"Body Bags"	Tyrin Turner, Troy Garity, Michael Rapaport, Shelton «Essman» Rivers, Tash & Faizon Love	2:09
19.	"The Hit Man"	Faizon Love, Mekhi Phifer & Radha Nilia	1:45
20.	"Drop A Jewel On Me"	Clarence Williams III, Sticky Fingaz, Marcus Smith III & Gromyko Collins	3:28

CD 2

No.	Title	Performers	Length
1.	"Ain’t Scared Of No Police"	Michael Rapaport, Tyrin Turner & Sticky Fingaz	2:18
2.	"Gotta Die"	Sticky Fingaz, Michael K. Williams, Mario Jones & Bokeem Woodbine	2:43
3.	"Brother To Brother"	Bokeem Woodbine & Sticky Fingaz	2:45
4.	"The Preacher"	Sticky Fingaz & Malik Whitfield	2:39
5.	"Getting' Outta The Game"	Sticky Fingaz, Peter «Pistol Pete» Torres & Drena De Niro	2:31
6.	"Don’t Owe Me Nothin'"	Omar Epps & Sticky Fingaz	2:22
7.	"The Assassination"	Hassan Johnson, Vivian Smallwood, Nancye Ferguson, Fredro Starr & Bokeem Woodbine	2:13
8.	"Not To Kill Black"	Melinda Santiago & Sticky Fingaz	2:06
9.	"Can’t Live Forever"	Bokeem Woodbine, Fredro Starr, James «730 Da Boss» Smith & Keith Robinson	2:24
10.	"Love To Love You"	Melinda Santiago	3:02
11.	"Police Chief"	Erik Palladino, Gill Gayle & Nadine Velazquez	0:43
12.	"Plot Is Gettin' Thicker"	Faizon Love, Tash, Dontwon & Michael «Big Bear» Taliferro	2:14
13.	"Cops Following Me"	Tyrin Turner & Michael Rapaport	0:52
14.	"The Airport"	Tash, Kenneth «Mustafa» Robertson, Faizon Love, Sticky Fingaz, Melinda Santiago, Bokeem Woodbine, Fredro Starr, Tyrin Turner & Michael Rapaport	3:16
15.	"I’m Dead"	Sticky Fingaz & Melinda Santiago	2:42
16.	"Love Is A Gun (Bonus Track)"	Onyx, Mezmo	4:35
17.	"Debo The Game (Bonus Track)"	Sticky Fingaz	3:56
18.	"Blinded By The Light (Bonus Track)"	Onyx, Optimus	4:48
19.	"Onyxdomain.com (Bonus Track)"	Onyx	3:45
20.	"No Swagger (iTunes Bonus Track)"	Sticky Fingaz	3:42

== Reception ==
Professional ratings
Review scores
Source	Rating
Allmusic	2.5/5 stars

The film received mixed to positive reviews from critics. Erin Burris from JustPressPlay wrote her review: "...The movie was just an endless array of flashy camera and flashier guns and jewelry. It was shot after shot of shot after shot. The whole film was a glorified music video and an excuse to show ladies in hot tubs and gratuitous gun shot wounds. No wonder it didn’t have a theatrical release."

Bart Rietvink from Cine Magazine also spoke on this subject: "...Women like sex objects, gangsters, shoot outs, and pampered rides abound in 'A Day in the Life', but it all thunders little when the lyrics reach the viewer (usually) in rhyme and accompanied with a nice beat."

Tyler Foster from DVDTalk gave his own assessment: "...And yet A Day in the Life is a highly entertaining and extremely watchable movie, because the plot and direction all take a backseat to Jones' central conceit, which is clever, interesting and different."

Christopher Armstead from FilmCriticsUnited summed up: "...I did enjoy watching ‘A Day in the Life’ which is the second Hip Hopera I’ve seen with the first being ‘Confessions of a Thug’. ‘Thug’ was probably an overall better movie than ‘Life’ even though it had a quarter of a percent of the star power of ‘Life’, but... ‘A Day in the Life’ was 100% pure hip-hop."

Jeff from The Jaded Viewer gave his final forecast: "See this movie. At least, for novelty sake. I mean this film has singlehandedly reaffirmed my faith in modern black cinema. I had once been lost and confused. Searching for something to fill the emptiness in my soul that was once filled with rap and gang violence. But now, I can say, once again, I am whole. Yes, I have found my savior. And my savior’s name is Sticky Fingaz."

== See also ==
- List of hood films
