= Decade: "...but wait it gets worse" =

Studio album by Sticky Fingaz
- Released: April 29, 2003
- Recorded: 2002–2003
- Studios: OPM Studios (Los Angeles, California)
- Genres: East Coast hip-hop; hardcore hip-hop
- Length: 57:11
- Label: D3
- Producers: Scott Storch; S-Man; DSP; Porky; Denny Smothers; Goldstein; Bird; Sticky Fingaz

Sticky Fingaz chronology
Black Trash: The Autobiography of Kirk Jones (2001)	Decade: "...but wait it gets worse" (2003)

Singles from Decade: "...but wait it gets worse"
- 1. "Can't Call It" Released: April 8, 2003

Professional ratings
Review scores
Source	Rating
AllMusic	2.5/5 stars
RateYourMusic	2.11/5 stars
MVRemix	6.5/10 stars

Decade: "...but wait it gets worse" is the second studio album by Onyx member Sticky Fingaz, released on April 29, 2003 by D3 Entertainment. The album is the follow-up to Black Trash: The Autobiography of Kirk Jones.

Decade was produced by several producers including Scott Storch, S-Man, DSP and Sticky Fingaz. It features guest appearances from Onyx's member Fredro Starr, Onyx's affiliate X1, actor Omar Epps, Missy Elliott and others.

The album picked at number 176 on the US Billboard 200, number 37 on the Top R&B/Hip-Hop Albums and debuted at number 9 on the Top Independent Albums chart.

== Background ==
Sticky Fingaz made a deal with D3 Entertainment to release one album. He chose this label because he into owning his masters and getting the most from his work, 7 dollars a record over here. Basically, D3 Entertainment is just like a distributor and the really label is OPM aka Other People's Money.

The first half for the album title, "Decade...", refers to 2003 being the 10th anniversary since the first Onyx album was released. The second half, "But Wait It Gets Worse", is a reference to a lyric from Sticky's verse in Onyx's 1993 hit single "Slam" and was intended to help lead up to Sticky's third solo album "A Day in the Life of Sticky Fingaz", which was released later in 2009. The song "I Love da Streets" was said to be Sticky's favorite song on the album.

The album is dedicated to the memory of the late DJ of Run-D.M.C., Jam Master Jay, Sticky Fingaz mentor.

"...I dedicate this motherfucking album to my motherfucking nigga, my mentor, my brother, the nigga that fucking put me on, Jam Master Jay [...] I am not going to fucking mourn his death, I am going to celebrate his motherfucking life!"

The album was released in two versions: one is an enhanced disc which features a short behind the scenes documentary on the making of album, and the other without. The album is now out of print.

== Track listing ==
#	Title	Featuring	Producer(s)	Length
1	"Intro"	Iceman	S-Man	2:27
2	"Let's Do It"	X-1 & Columbo The Shining Star	S-Man	3:00
3	"What Chu Here For"	Omar Epps, Detroit Diamond & Rio	S-Man	3:40
4	"Can't Call It "	Missy Elliott	Scott Storch	2:33
5	"Hot Now"		Scott Storch	3:55
6	"I Love Da Streets"	Omar Epps	DSP, Sticky Fingaz	2:51
7	"Bad Guy"	My Quan	DSP, Sticky Fingaz	3:31
8	"Shot Up"		Porky	2:52
9	"Girl"		DSP, Sticky Fingaz	2:47
10	"Caught In Da Game"	Blaze Da Tyrant	DSP, Sticky Fingaz	4:45
11	"No More"	My Quan	DSP, Sticky Fingaz	3:50
12	"Do Da Dam Thing"	E.S.T., X-1	Scott Storch	2:56
13	"Another Niguh"		DSP	2:20
14	"I Don't Know"	Fredro Starr	Denny Smothers, Porky	3:32
15	"Suicide Letter"		S-Man	3:09
16	"Just Like Us"	X1, Geneveese	Goldstein	4:43
17	"Get Smashed Up"	Seven O.D., Lex & Thirty	Bird	4:20

== Personnel ==
Credits for Decade: "...but wait it gets worse" adapted from AllMusic.

- Columbo - Featured Artist, Guest Artist, Vocals
- Detroit Diamond - Featured Artist, Guest Artist, Vocals
- DSP - Producer
- Omar Epps - Executive Producer, Featured Artist, Guest Artist, Vocals
- Geneveese - Featured Artist
- Iceman - Primary Artist
- K. Jones - Composer
- Kirk T. Jones - Composer
- Lex & Thirty - Featured Artist
- Brian Porizek - Artwork, Design
- Porky - Producer
- My Quan - Featured Artist
- Rio - Featured Artist
- Riviera - Record Label
- The S-Man - Producer
- Seven O.D. - Featured Artist
- Fredro Starr - Executive Producer, Featured Artist, Guest Artist, Vocals
- Sticky Fingaz - Executive Producer, Primary Artist, Producer, Vocals
- Scott Storch - Executive Producer, Producer
- Esbjörn Svensson Trio - Featured Artist
- 30 - Guest Artist, Vocals
- X 1 - Guest Artist, Vocals
- X-1 - Featured Artist
- Debra Young - Photography

== Charts ==
=== Weekly charts ===
Chart (2003)	Peak position
US Billboard 200	176
US Top R&B/Hip-Hop Albums (Billboard)	37
US Independent Albums (Billboard)	9
