= Sticky Fingaz =

American rapper (born 1973)

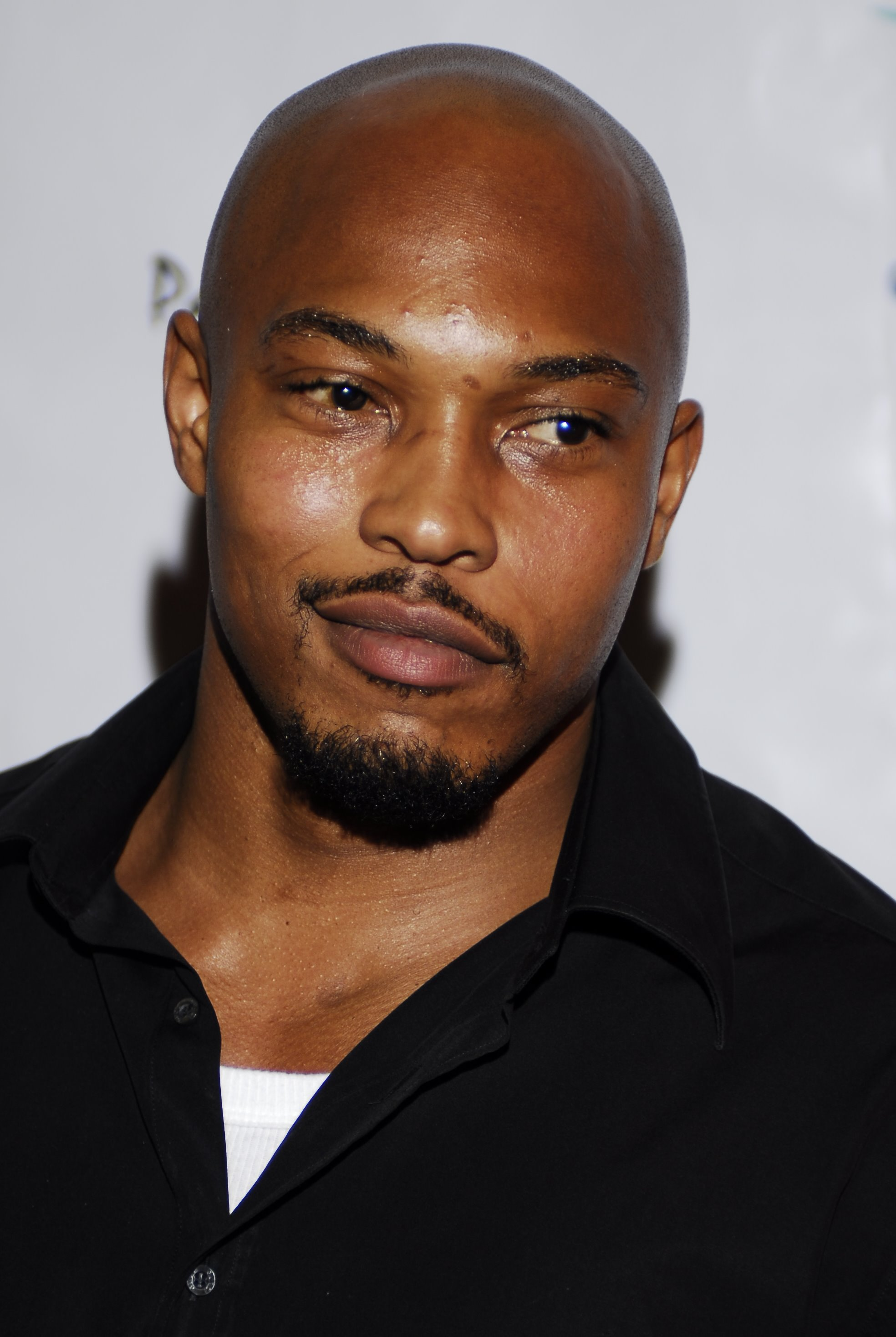
- Jones in 2007

Background information
- Also known as: Trop; Sticky
- Born: Kirk Jones; November 3, 1973 (age 52); East Flatbush, New York, U.S.
- Origin: Queens, New York City, U.S.
- Genres: East Coast hip-hop; hardcore hip-hop
- Occupations: Rapper; record producer; director; film editor; writer; actor
- Years active: 1991–present
- Labels: JMJ; Def Jam; Universal; D3; Major Independents
- Member of: Onyx
- Website: stickyfingaz.co

Kirk Jones (born November 3, 1973), better known by his stage name Sticky Fingaz, is an American rapper, record producer and actor best known as a member of platinum selling hardcore rap group Onyx.

Sticky Fingaz was discovered by Jam Master Jay of Run-D.M.C., who signed Onyx on his label JMJ Records provided that Sticky would be in the group. His lazy eye, raspy voice, and boundless energy brought attention to the group, and he became the frontman. Onyx went on to release three top-selling albums before Sticky Fingaz began his solo career.

Sticky Fingaz starred in more than 80 films and television shows. In 1993, he made his acting debut in Forest Whitaker's award-winning HBO drama Strapped. His feature film credits include Spike Lee's Clockers, In Too Deep, Lockdown, Doing Hard Time and Breaking Point, but is best known for his role as "Tyrone" in Next Friday. He made his television debut in New York Undercover and Nash Bridges, but is best known for his role as the Marvel Comics superhero Blade in Blade: The Series. In 2022, he had a recurring role in the Showtime comedy series, Flatbush Misdemeanors.

Sticky Fingaz wrote, produced, directed, and starred in two feature films done entirely in the genre of "hip hopera" through his production company Major Independents: A Day in the Life and Caught On Tape. Both films were released by Lionsgate Home Entertainment. In 2019, Fingaz released It's About T.I.M.E., which he describes as a "Digital Album Movie".

On August 12, 2020, Sticky Fingaz was unanimously voted to be President of the newly formed Hunger Aid Foundation. In July 2021, Sticky Fingaz opened K. Jones & Company, a holding company that develops strategy and brand building in the culture.

== Early life ==
Jones was born in Kings County Hospital Center on November 3, 1973 in the East Flatbush neighborhood in Brooklyn, New York. He grew up in the Flatbush, Brooklyn neighborhood. When he was a child, he wanted to be a DJ.

In an interview with DJ Vlad, Jones revealed that he had been a member of the "Lo-Lifes," a local Brooklyn street gang that mainly engaged in petty retail theft of Polo clothing (rather than in drug dealing or violent turf wars). This was the reason for his nickname "Sticky Fingaz" ("sticky fingers" is an idiomatic term meaning an inclination to steal).

When his mother moved the family to Bloomfield, New Jersey, she enrolled Jones in Manhattan's High School of Art and Design, hoping he would focus on his talents, in particular his gift for drawing. In 1990, at age 16, Jones moved out of his mother's house to South Jamaica, Queens to live with his cousin Fredro Starr, who worked in Queens as a barber.

== Music career ==
=== Onyx ===
Fredro Starr, Big DS and Suave (also known as Sonny Seeza) met Jam Master Jay in a traffic jam at The Jones Beach GreekFest Festival on July 13, 1991. Jay give them about two months to get a demo, but Suave and Big DS didn't make it to the studio because they were stranded in Connecticut. So Jeff Harris, the manager of Onyx, asked Fredro to come to the studio with his cousin, Kirk Jones, who at the time was doing a solo career under the name Trop and working in the barbershop. Fredro and Sticky Fingaz made two records, "Stik 'N' Muve" and "Exercise".

In 1993, Onyx released their debut album entitled Bacdafucup. It proved to be a commercial success and eventually went multi-platinum, largely due to the well known single "Slam". Then Onyx released on JMJ Records another two albums: All We Got Iz Us and Shut 'Em Down. JMJ Records as well as Onyx was officially removed from Def Jam on "Black Thursday" – January 21, 1999 – because the label PolyGram, who in 1994 purchased 50% of Sony's Def Jam, was sold to Seagram on December 10, 1998.

Only four years earlier, Onyx were "saving Def Jam", as Sticky Fingaz put it, but now they were hoping the label would save them. Their third—and what would become their final—album on Def Jam, "Shut 'Em Down", barely went gold.

=== Solo career ===
Jones released his debut solo album in 2001 which was titled Black Trash: The Autobiography of Kirk Jones, a concept album that followed the (fictionalized) life of Kirk Jones in a hip-hopera storytelling fashion starting from his release from prison and ultimately ending with his death. The album was a critical success, being noted as very creative with substantial content, though it didn't gain much commercial recognition despite featuring well-known artists such as Eminem, Raekwon, Rah Digga, Dave Hollister, Redman and Canibus.

In 2003, he released his second album, Decade "...but wait it gets worse", which was less well received by critics and gained even less mainstream acknowledgement, featuring on this album were performances from Fredro Starr and Omar Epps.

In 2019, Fingaz released his third album, It's About T.I.M.E. The album was released as a "digital album movie" and is accompanied by musical film, which tells about the life of an American rapper Sticky Fingaz, starting from his birth to the entry into Onyx. The album is available only on Sticky's own website.

== Acting career ==
Jones was a regular on the short-lived UPN series Platinum as Grady Rhames. He also played the part of Pvt. Maurice "Smoke" Williams in the FX television series Over There, which depicts life as an American soldier in Iraq. He played Tyrone in Next Friday. Jones also played a recurring role as Kern Little, a gang leader and hiphop musician/producer on the FX series The Shield. He has also appeared in the direct-to-video and Sci-Fi Channel release House of the Dead 2.

Starting in 2006, Jones was cast as the half-human/half-vampire Blade in Blade: The Series, a continuation of the Blade film series starring Wesley Snipes, with the show airing on Spike TV. The series was cancelled on September 29, 2006, through a press release from Spike. He has completed his work on a movie titled Karma, Confessions and Holi where he plays the character Rich Smooth. Jones was a major character in the remake of the movie Flight of the Phoenix. In the video game Def Jam: Fight for NY he supplied his own voice and is one of the main antagonists throughout the story. He also has an appearance in the sequel, Def Jam: Icon, under the name Wink. Fingaz wrote, co-produced, co-directed and starred in the movie A Day in the Life.

Fingaz released a movie It's About T.I.M.E. through his production company Major Independents on February 14, 2019. Sticky Fingaz not only wrote the script for this film, but also presented himself as a director, cinematographer and producer of the film, and also he played a role in it. A feature of this film is the format in which it was released – "Digital Album Movie", created by the rapper.

Jones had a recurring role in Season 2 of Showtime's Flatbush Misdemeanors where he played Anthony, the brother of Hassan Johnson's character, Drew. Jones and Johnson previously worked together on Clockers.

== Discography ==
Studio albums

- Black Trash: The Autobiography of Kirk Jones (2001)
- Decade: "...but wait it gets worse" (2003)
- It's About T.I.M.E. (2019)

Mixtapes

- Stickyfingaz.com (2009)
- God of the Underground (2010)

Soundtracks

- A Day in the Life (2009)
- Caught On Tape (2013)

== Filmography ==
=== Film ===
Year	Title	Role	Notes
1993	Strapped	Suspect in Lineup	TV movie
1995	Clockers	Scientific	
1995	Dead Presidents	Martin	
1998	Ride	Brotha X	
1998	Le New Yorker	Harlem Homeboy	
1999	In Too Deep	Ozzie	
1999	Black and White	Himself	
1999	Game Day	Wille	
1999	Love Goggles	Jason	
2000	Next Friday	Tyrone	
2000	Boricua's Bond	Tyler	
2000	The Price of Air	D	
2000	Lockdown	Broadway	
2000	The Playaz Court	T-Bone	
2001	Lift	Quik	
2001	MacArthur Park	E-Max	
2002	L.A.X.	Leon	
2002	Reality Check	Brock	
2003	Malibooty!	Raymond	Video
2003	Ride or Die	Demise	Video
2003	Leprechaun: Back 2 tha Hood	Cedric	Video
2003	Hot Parts	Toby	Video
2004	Doing Hard Time	Eddie Mathematic	Video
2004	Flight of the Phoenix	Jeremy	
2004	True Vinyl	Power Z	
2004	Gas	Craig	
2005	House of the Dead 2	Sergeant Dalton	
2008	Nite Tales: The Movie	Dice	
2009	Dough Boys	Deuce	
2009	Karma, Confessions and Holi	Rich Smooth	
2009	A Day in the Life	Stick	
2009	Steppin: The Movie	Cedric	
2009	Breaking Point	Richard Allen	
2010	Once Fallen	Leshaun	
2010	Love Chronicles: Secrets Revealed	Kevin	Video
2010	Hard Breakers	Shay	
2011	Fanaddict	Alex	
2012	Changing the Game	Craig Jenkins	
2012	Speed Demons	Kenny	
2013	Caught On Tape	Mark	
2013	Vampire Riderz	T.J.	
2013	Brooklyn Knight	Knight	
2014	Motel	Lizard	
2014	The Dead Sea	Sergeant Brooks	
2015	The Road Movie	Himself	Short
2017	The Fearless One	Tre	
2019	Fanatic	Sosa	TV movie
2019	Paradise City	Chief Frank Murdoch	
2019	It's About T.I.M.E.	Himself	Short
2022	One Bad Habit	Leonard Williams	
2022	Brooklyn Knight	Knight	
2024	Halfway House	Xavier	
2024	Darkness of Man	Yates	
2025	Shattered Reflection	Red	
TBA	Drifter †	TBA	Filming

=== Television ===
Year	Title	Role	Notes
1993	Soul Train	Himself	Episode: "Onyx/Jody Watley/Erick Sermon"
1995	New York Undercover	Khalil	Episode: "You Get No Respect"
1997	Good News	Tony	Episode: "A Joyful Noise"
1997	413 Hope St.	Max	Episode: "Lost Boys and Gothic Girls"
1997	New York Undercover	Assassin	Episode: "No Place Like Hell"
1999	Nash Bridges	Mario Baptiste	Episode: "Get Bananas"
1999	The Parkers	Dwayne	Episode: "It's a Family Affair"
2000	18 Wheels of Justice	Shooter	Episode: "Two Eyes for an Eye"
2002	The Twilight Zone	Ricky	Episode: "Harsh Mistress"
2002	Just Cause	Lucas	Episode: "Fading Star"
2002–06	The Shield	Kern Little	Recurring Cast: Season 1-3 & 5
2003	Platinum	Grady Rhames	Main Cast
2005	Over There	Pvt. Maurice 'Smoke' Williams	Main Cast
2005	CSI: Miami	Scott Owens	Episode: "10–7"
2006	Blade: The Series	Eric Brooks / Blade	Main Cast
2007	Law & Order: Criminal Intent	Detective Harry Williams	Episode: "Flipped"
2007	Tell Me You Love Me	Terrance	Episode: "Episode #1.8"
2008	The Real World: Hollywood	Himself	Recurring Cast
2009	The Beast	Caesar	Episode: "Pilot"
2009	Burn Notice	Felix Cole	Episode: "Hot Spot"
2009	Raising the Bar	Mr. Cantwell	Episode: "Happy Ending"
2010	NCIS: Los Angeles	Rashad 'Slide' Hollander	Episode: "Blood Brothers"
2010	Rizzoli & Isles	Himself	Episode: "When the Gun Goes Bang, Bang, Bang"
2011	CSI: Miami	Leo Kendry	Episode: "Countermeasures"
2012	NYC 22	Monsta White	Episode: "Firebomb"
2015	Blue Bloods	Clinton 'Ice' Wallace	Episode: "New Rules" & "The Art of War"
2016	The Night Of	Rikers Inmate	Episode: "A Dark Crate" & "The Art of War"
2016	The Grind TV 1.0	Sticky	Episode: "Theft"
2016	Loosely Exactly Nicole	Little Stroke	Episode: "Brother Visits"
2016-17	Empire	Brikk	Episode: "A Furnace for Your Foe" & "Sound & Fury"
2017	Grown Folks	Fatsy Bulger	Episode: "Snitches Get Stitches"
2019	Broken Ground	Marcus	Episode: "The Big Payback"
2022	Flatbush Misdemeanors	Anthony	Recurring Cast: Season 2

=== Video games ===
Year	Title	Role	Notes
1995	Rap Jam: Volume One	Himself	
2004	Def Jam: Fight for NY	Himself (voice)	
2005	Law & Order: Criminal Intent	Detective Harry Williams (voice)	
2006	Def Jam Fight for NY: The Takeover	Himself	
2007	Def Jam: Icon	Wink (voice)	

== Awards and nominations ==
Year	Award	Nominated work	Category	Result
1994	American Music Awards of 1994	"Bacdafucup"	Rap/Hip-Hop New Artist	Nominated
1994	1994 Soul Train Music Awards	"Bacdafucup"	Best Rap Album	Won
2020	ASCAP Pop Music Awards	Travis Scott — "Sicko Mode" (as writer)	The most performed songs of 2019	Won
2020	ASCAP Pop Music Awards	Travis Scott — "Sicko Mode" (as writer)	The top streamed songs of 2019	Won
