= Warren G production discography =

The following is a discography of production by Warren G from 1993 to 2016.

== 1993 ==
=== MC Breed - The New Breed ===
- 03. "Gotta Get Mine" (feat. 2Pac) {Produced with Colin Wolfe}
- 05. "Comin' Real Again" (feat. 2Pac) {Produced with Colin Wolfe}
- 07. "Watch Your Own Back" (feat. Admiral D, Black Ceasar, Jibri)
- 09. "Conversations"

=== Various Artists - Poetic Justice (soundtrack) ===
- 02. "Indo Smoke" (Mista Grimm w/ Warren G & Nate Dogg)
- 08. "Definition of a Thug Nigga" (2Pac) {Produced with 2Pac}

== 1994 ==
=== DFC - Things in tha Hood ===
- 06. "Pass the Hooter" (feat. Warren G)

=== Various Artists - Above the Rim (soundtrack) ===
- 07. "Regulate" (Warren G feat. Nate Dogg)
  - Sample Credit: "I Keep Forgettin' (Every Time You're Near)" by Michael McDonald
  - Sample Credit: "Sign of the Times" by Bob James

=== Warren G - Regulate... G Funk Era ===
- 01. "Regulate" (feat. Nate Dogg)
  - Sample Credit: "I Keep Forgettin' (Every Time You're Near)" by Michael McDonald
  - Sample Credit: "Sign of the Times" by Bob James
- 02. "Do You See"
  - Sample Credit: "Juicy Fruit" by Mtume
  - Sample Credit: "Mama Used To Say" by Junior Giscombe
- 03. "Gangsta Sermon" (feat. B-Tip and Ricky Harris)
- 04. "Recognize" (feat. Twinz)
- 05. "Super Soul Sis" (feat. Jah Skills)
  - Sample Credit: "Don't Stop (Ever Loving Me)" by One Way
  - Sample Credit: "Why Have I Lost You" by Cameo
  - Sample Credit: "Nuthin' but a 'G' Thang (Freestyle Remix)" by Snoop Dogg
- 06. "94' Ho Draft" (feat. B-Tip and Ricky Harris)
  - Sample Credit: "Groove to Get Down" by T-Connection
- 07. "So Many Ways" (feat. Wayniac and Lady Levi)
- 08. "This D.J."
  - Sample Credit: "Curious" by Midnight Star
  - Sample Credit: "Juicy Fruit" by Mtume
  - Sample Credit: "Paid in Full" by Eric B. & Rakim
- 09. "This Is the Shack" (feat. The Dove Shack)
- 10. "What's Next" (feat. Mr. Malik)
- 11. "And Ya Don't Stop"
  - Sample Credit: "Janitzio" by Don Julian
- 12. "Runnin' wit No Breaks" (feat. Jah Skills, Bo Roc, G Child and The Twinz)
  - Sample Credit: "Go On and Cry" by Les McCann & Eddie Harris
  - Sample Credit: "N.T." by Kool & the Gang
- 00. "This DJ (Remix)"

=== Various Artists - Jason's Lyric (soundtrack) ===
- 09. "Walk Away" (Da 5 Footaz)
- 14. "First Round Draft Pick" (Twinz w/ Warren G)

=== Thug Life - Thug Life: Volume 1 ===
- 06. "How Long Will They Mourn Me?" (feat. Nate Dogg) (Produced with Nate Dogg)

=== Shaquille O'Neal - Shaq Fu: Da Return ===
- 03. "Biological Didn't Bother (G-Funk Version)"
- 04. "My Dear" (feat. Warren G)

=== Slick Rick - Behind Bars ===
- 11. "Behind Bars (Dum Ditty Dum Mix)" [feat. Warren G]

=== Various Artists - B-Ball's Best Kept Secret ===
- 06. "Flow On" (Cedric Ceballos & Warren G)

== 1995 ==
=== Kam - Made in America ===
- 11. "Keep tha Peace" {Produced with Kam}

=== Various Artists - Bad Boys (soundtrack) ===
- 02. "So Many Ways (Bad Boys Version)" (Warren G)

=== Various Artists - The Show (soundtrack) ===
- 20. "Still Can't Fade It" (Warren G w/ Twinz & Bo-Roc)

=== The Dove Shack - This Is the Shack ===
- 03. "This Is the Shack"

=== Twinz - Conversation ===
- 01. "Conversation # 1"
- 02. "Round & Round" (feat. Nancy Fletcher)
- 03. "Good Times" (feat. Nancy Fletcher)
- 05. "Jump Ta This"
- 06. "Eastside LB" (feat. Warren G & Nancy Fletcher)
- 07. "Sorry I Kept You" (feat. Warren G & Nancy Fletcher)
- 08. "Conversation # 2"
- 09. "Journey wit Me" (feat. Bo-Roc)
- 10. "Hollywood" (feat. Neb, Jah-Skillz and Nanci Fletcher)
- 11. "1st Round Draft Pick" (feat. Warren G)
- 12. "Conversation # 3"
- 13. "Don't Get It Twisted" (feat. New Birth)
- 14. "Pass It On" (feat. Foesum & Warren G)

== 1996 ==
=== Various Artists - The Nutty Professor (soundtrack) ===
- 08. "We Want Yo Hands Up" (Warren G w/ Mr. Malik)

=== New Edition - Hit Me Off 12" ===
- 00. "Hit Me Off ("G" Formulated Mix)"

=== Various Artists - Supercop (soundtrack) ===
- 02. "What's Love Got to Do with It" (Warren G w/ Adina Howard)
  - Sample Credit: "What's Love Got to Do with It" by Tina Turner

=== Yo-Yo - Total Control ===
- 10. "Yo-Yo's Night"

== 1997 ==
=== Various Artists - Good Burger (soundtrack) ===
- 05. Friends (Warren G)

=== Warren G - Take a Look Over Your Shoulder ===
- 01. "Star Trek Intro"
- 02. "Annie Mae" (feat. Nate Dogg)
- 03. "Smokin' Me Out" (feat. Ron Isley)
  - Sample Credit: "Coolin' Me Out" by The Isley Brothers=
- 04. "Ricky in Church"
- 05. "Reality"
- 06. "Ricky and G-Child"
- 07. "Young Fun" (feat. Jayo Felony & Knee-Hi)
- 08. "What We Go Through" (feat. Mr. Malik, Bad Azz & Perfec)
- 09. "We Brings Heat" (feat. Twinz & Da Five Footaz)
- 10. "Transformers"
- 11. "Real Tight Intro"
- 12. "Relax Ya Mind" (feat. Reel Tight)
- 13. "To All DJ's"
- 14. "Back Up"
- 15. "Can You Feel It"
  - Sample Credit: "Can You Feel It" by The Fat Boys
- 16. "I Shot the Sheriff"
  - Sample Credit: "I Shot the Sheriff" by Bob Marley
- 17. "I Shot the Sheriff (EPMD Remix)"

=== 2Pac - R U Still Down? (Remember Me) (Disc 1) ===
- 10. "Lie to Kick It" (feat. Richie Rich)
- 13. "Definition of a Thug Nigga"

== 1998 ==
=== Various Artists - Woo (soundtrack) ===
- 04. "Nobody Does It Better" (Nate Dogg w/ Warren G)
  - Sample Credit: "Let's Get Closer" by Atlantic Starr

=== Nate Dogg - G-Funk Classics, Vol. 1 & 2 (Disc 2: The Prodigal Son) ===
- 07. "No Matter Where I Go" (feat. Barbara Wilson)
- 09. "Friends" (feat. Snoop Dogg & Warren G)
- 12. "Nobody Does It Better" (feat. Warren G)
  - Sample Credit: "Let's Get Closer" by Atlantic Starr

=== Kurupt - Kuruption! ===
- 10. "That's Gangsta"

=== Redman - I'll Bee Dat! 12" ===
- 03. "Pick It Up (Warren G Remix)"

== 1999 ==
=== Reel Tight - Back to the Real ===
- 03. "I Lied"
- 04. "I'm So Sorry" (feat. Jessica)
- 08. "Lady"
- 09. "Sittin' in the Club" (feat. Ronnie DeVoe)

=== Mac Dre - Rapper Gone Bad ===
- 04. "Fast Money" (feat. Warren G, Kokane & Dutches)

=== Warren G - I Want It All ===
- 01. "Intro"
- 02. "Gangsta Love" (feat. Kurupt, RBX & Nate Dogg)
- 03. "Why Oh Why" (feat. Tha Dogg Pound )
- 04. "Dollars Make Sence" (feat. Kurupt & Crucial Conflict)
  - Sample Credit: "Painted Pictures" by Commodores
- 05. "I Want It All" (feat. Mack 10)
  - Sample Credit: "I Like It" by DeBarge
- 06. "Havin' Thangs" (feat. Jermaine Dupri)
- 07. "You Never Know" (feat. Snoop Dogg, Phats Bossi & Reel Tight)
  - Sample Credit: "Sweet Love" by Lionel Richie
- 09. "G-Spot" (feat. El DeBarge & Val Young)
  - Sample Credit: "Valdez In The Country" by D. Hathaway
- 11. "Dope Beat"
  - Sample Credit: "Private World" by Side Effect
- 12. "World Wide Ryders" (feat. Neb Love and K-Bar)
- 13. "Game Don't Wait" (feat. Snoop Dogg, Nate Dogg & Xzibit)
- 14. "If We Give You a Chance" (feat. Slick Rick, Phats Bossi & Val Young)
- 15. "I Want It All (Remix)" (feat. Memphis Bleek, Drag-On & Tikki Diamond)
- 16. "Outro"

== 2000 ==
=== Tha Eastsidaz - Tha Eastsidaz ===
- 14. "Big Bang Theory" (featuring Xzibit, Kurupt, CPO & Pinky)

=== Before Dark - Monica 12" ===
- 00. "Monica (Flawless Warren G. Mix)"

=== TQ - The Second Coming ===
- 10. "One Day" (featuring Layzie Bone)
- 14. "The Grind" (featuring Warren G)

=== Various Artists - Big Momma's House (soundtrack) ===
- 06. "Radio" (Kurupt with Phats Bossi)

== 2001 ==
=== Various Artists - Uninvited Guests (soundtrack) ===
- 03. "Through the Rain" (Phats Bossi)

=== Various Artists - Bones (soundtrack) ===
- 11. "If You Came Here to Party" (Snoop Dogg with Tha Eastsidaz & Kola)

=== Daz Dillinger - Who Ride wit Us: Tha Compalation, Vol. 1 ===
- 20. "Why oh Why" (featuring Warren G & Kurupt)

=== Warren G - The Return of the Regulator ===
- 01. "Intro"
- 03. "Here Comes Another Hit" (featuring Mista Grimm & Nate Dogg)
- 05. "This Gangsta Shit Is Too Much" (featuring Butch Cassidy)
- 06. "Pump Up (Skit)"
- 07. "Young Locs Slow Down" (featuring WC & Butch Cassidy)
- 08. "Speed Dreamin'" (featuring George Clinton & Mista Grimm)
- 09. "Yo' Sassy Ways" (featuring Snoop Dogg & Nate Dogg)
- 10. "Deez Nuts Part II (Skit)"
- 11. "It Ain't Nothin' Wrong With You" (featuring Mista Grimm, Boss Hogg & Vic Damone)
- 12. "Ghetto Village"
- 13. "They Lovin' Me Now" (featuring Boss Hogg & Butch Cassidy)
- 14. "Streets of LBC" (featuring Lady Mo)
- 15. "G-Funk Is Here to Stay" (featuring Mista Grimm & Kokane)
- 16. "Keepin' It Strong" (featuring El DeBarge)

== 2003 ==
=== Various Artists - True Crime: Streets of LA (soundtrack) ===
- 04. "What U Wanna Do" (Warren G with RBX)

== 2004 ==
=== 213 - The Hard Way ===
- 00. "Groupie Luv (G Funk "Grown Up" Remix)"

=== Knoc-turn'al - The Way I Am ===
- 10. "What We Do" (featuring Xzibit, Warren G & Nate Dogg)

=== Various Artists - West Coast Unified ===
- 12. "Turn It Up Now" (Warren G featuring Chuck Taylor)
- 25. "After Dark" (Snoop Dogg featuring Warren G, Bad Azz, Kokane, Daz Dillinger & E-White)

== 2005 ==
=== Various Artists - XXx: State of the Union (soundtrack) ===
- 11. "Lookin' For U" (Chingy with G.I.B.)

=== Warren G - In the Mid-Nite Hour ===
- 01. "Intro Shhhh"
- 02. "On My Mind" (featuring Bishop Lamont, Chevy Jones, Mike Anthony & Bokey)
- 03. "Make It Do What It Do" (featuring Bishop Lamont)
- 04. "In Case Some Shit Go Down" (featuring Mike Jones & Frank Lee White)
- 05. "I Need a Light" (featuring Nate Dogg)
- 06. "Get U Down'" (featuring B-Real & Side Effect)
- 07. "A Chronic Break"
- 08. "Weed Song" (featuring Frank Lee White)
- 09. "Wheels Keep Spinin'"
- 11. "Walk These Streets" (featuring Raphael Saadiq) (Produced with Raphael Saadiq)
- 12. "Garilla Pimpin" (featuring Bishop Lamont)
- 13. "Turn It Up Loud" (featuring Chuck Taylor)
- 14. "In the Mid-Nite Hour"
- 15. "I Like That There" (featuring Bishop Lamont)
- 16. "Yes Sir" (featuring Snoop Dogg, Bishop Lamont & Frank Lee White)
- 17. "Ahh" (featuring Bishop Lamont, Frank Lee White and Chuck Taylor)
- 18. "All I Ask of You" (featuring Frank Lee White, Bishop Lamont and Chevy Jones)
- 19. "Get U Down, Part II" (featuring B-Real, Snoop Dogg, Ice Cube & Side Effect)

== 2006 ==
=== Ice Cube - Laugh Now, Cry Later ===
- 22. "Race Card" (Best Buy Bonus Track)

== 2009 ==
=== Ray J - For the Love of Ray J ===
- 03. "Crush" (featuring Warren G)

=== Gucci Mane ===
- 00. "Crush on You"

=== Wale and 9th Wonder - Back to the Feature ===
- 20. "Rhyme and Reason" (featuring Tre)

=== Warren G - The G Files ===
- 01. "Intro"
- 02. "The West Is Back" (featuring Bad Lucc & Halla)
- 03. "True Star" (featuring BJ)
- 04. "Let's Get High (420 Anthem)" (featuring Travis Barker & Black Nicc)
- 05. "100 Miles and Runnin" (featuring Raekwon & Nate Dogg)
- 06. "Skate, Skate" (featuring Halla)
- 07. "Drinks Ain't Free"
- 08. "Swagger Rich" (featuring Snoop Dogg & Cassie Davis)
- 09. "Suicide" (featuring RBX)
- 10. "Masquerade" (featuring Bad Lucc & Halla)
- 11. "Hold On"
- 12. "What's Wrong" (featuring Black Nicc & Halla)
- 13. "Ringtone"
- 14. "Crush" (featuring Ray J)

== 2011 ==
=== Styles P - Master of Ceremonies ===
- 01. "How I Fly" (featuring Avery Storm)

=== Snoop Dogg & Wiz Khalifa - Mac & Devin Go to High School (soundtrack) ===
- 02. "I Get Lifted" (featuring LaToiya Williams)

=== Young Jeezy - Thug Motivation 103: Hustlerz Ambition ===
- 05. "Leave You Alone" (featuring Ne-Yo)

== 2012 ==
=== E-40 - The Block Brochure: Welcome to the Soil 3 ===
- 13. "What Happened to Them Days" (featuring J Banks)

=== Young Jeezy - It's tha World ===
- 09. "Just Got Word" (featuring YG)

== 2013 ==
=== Mistah F.A.B. - I Found My Backpack 3 ===
- 01. "Dreams"

=== Problem - The Separation ===
- 12. "Phone"

== 2015 ==
=== RM and Warren G ===
- 00. "P.D.D"

== 2016 ==
=== Bishop Lamont - The Reformation G.D.N.I.A.F.T ===
- 09. "Razor Blade"

== Singles produced ==
- 1993
  - "Gotta Get Mine" (MC Breed featuring 2Pac)
  - "Indo Smoke" (Mista Grimm featuring Warren G & Nate Dogg)
- 1994
  - "Regulate" (Warren G featuring Nate Dogg)
  - "How Long Will They Mourn Me?" (Thug Life featuring Nate Dogg)
  - "This D.J." (Warren G)
  - "Do You See" (Warren G)
- 1995
  - "Round & Round" (Twinz featuring Nancy Fletcher)
  - "Steady Dippen" (Mista Grimm)
- 1996
  - "Eastside LB" (Twinz featuring Warren G & Nancy Fletcher)
  - "What's Love Got to Do with It" (Warren G featuring Adina Howard)
- 1997
  - "I Shot the Sheriff" (Warren G)
  - "Smokin' Me Out" (Warren G featuring Ron Isley)
- 1998
  - "Nobody Does It Better" (Nate Dogg featuring Warren G)
- 1999
  - "I Want It All" (Warren G featuring Mack 10)
- 2005
  - "Get U Down, Part II" (Warren G featuring B-Real, Snoop Dogg, Ice Cube & Side Effect)
  - "I Need a Light" (Warren G featuring Nate Dogg)
- 2009
  - "Ringtone" (Warren G)
  - "Crush" (Warren G & Ray J)
- 2011
  - "This Is Dedicated To You" (Warren G featuring LaToiya Williams)
- 2012
  - "Leave You Alone" (Young Jeezy featuring Ne-Yo)
  - "What Happened To Them Days" (E-40 featuring J Banks)
  - "Party We Will Throw Now!" (Warren G featuring Nate Dogg & The Game)
- 2015
  - "P.D.D." (RM and Warren G)
