= All We Got Iz Us =

Studio album by Onyx
- Released: October 24, 1995
- Studio: LGK (Leonia, New Jersey)
- Genres: East Coast hip-hop; hardcore hip-hop; horrorcore
- Length: 44:58
- Labels: JMJ; RAL
- Producers: Onyx; 8-Off Assassin

Onyx chronology
| Bacdafucup (1993) | All We Got Iz Us (1995) | Shut 'Em Down (1998) |

Singles from All We Got Iz Us
- 1. "Live Niguz" Released: July 18, 1995; 2. "Last Dayz" Released: October 3, 1995

All We Got Iz Us is the second studio album by American hip hop group Onyx, released on October 24, 1995, by JMJ Records and Rush Associated Labels. The album was produced by Onyx. The album features guest appearances from rap group All City and rapper from Queens, Panama P.I.

All We Got Iz Us debuted at number 22 on the US Billboard 200, and number 2 on the Top R&B/Hip Hop Albums chart. The album has sold over 500,000 copies. However, it did not approach the success of the first album.

Two charting singles were released from the album, "Last Dayz" which made it to 89 on the Billboard Hot 100 and 10 on the Hot Rap Singles and "Live Niguz", also known as "Live!!!", made it to 17 on the Hot Rap Singles and 81 on the R&B charts. "Live Niguz" appeared in the soundtrack to the 1995's documentary The Show and "Last Dayz" was used in the film "8 Mile".

== Background ==
In March 1994, when Fredro Starr was on the set of Dangerous Minds, Lyor Cohen came to him and offered him a million dollars for recording a new album, All We Got Iz Us. Big DS left the group at the same time to start a solo career. Onyx recorded 25 songs for this album, but only 15 of them were included on the album by Jam Master Jay's decision.

In the same year members of Onyx have formed a label, Armee Records, and have signed production and distribution deals with Capitol Records and Mercury Records. Onyx signed contracts with the artists All City (Greg Valentine and J. Mega) and Panama P.I., who featured on Onyx's sophomore set, "All We Got Iz Us", Gang Green and singer Choclatt (Jared Crawford).

== Aliases ==
On the album two group members came up with new aliases:

- Fredro Starr: Never.
- Suave: Sonee Seeza. Sonsee

== Conception of album title ==
The title All We Got Iz Us came up because it was a state of mind for Onyx at that time.

"...We made that title one day at the studio. At that time niggas was on the knees, crying, praying almost like 'I love you my nigga' and that's how All We Got Iz Us album came about. That album was pain. Now you got to run around with a Mac-12 in your trunk, bulletproof vest, mad money niggas, you think that niggas going to kill you, so this was our frame of mind."

== Lyrics ==
All We Got Iz Us this name was chosen because it is much more grimy than Bacdafucup. It is widely considered to be a great follow up to their debut Bacdafucup with many fans actually citing it as Onyx's best album. Turning away from the more humorous approach of their debut, All We Got Iz Us had an overall darker and more serious tone, dealing with subjects such as suicide, heavy substance abuse and racism. For example, the intro/opening track features a split-personality monologue: Sticky Fingaz threatening himself at gunpoint, eventually committing suicide.

== Singles ==
Two singles were released from this album: "Live Niguz" and "Last Dayz".

The first single, "Live Niguz", also known by its censored title "Live!!!", was released on July 18, 1995, as a single from Def Jam's The Show: The Soundtrack and as the first single from Onyx's second album, All We Got Iz Us. Produced by 8-Off Assassin and all three members of Onyx, "Live!!!" only found minor success on the R&B and rap charts, becoming the group's first single not to reach the Billboard Hot 100.

The second single, "Last Dayz" was released on October 3, 1995. Produced by 8-Off Assassin and Onyx, Last Dayz making it to number 89 on the US Billboard Hot 100. Instrumental of this song was used in the film 8 Mile for the rap battle between Lotto and B-Rabbit. In 2013, the song was re-recorded by Fredro Starr and Sticky Fingaz, and released on a compilation album Songs of the 90's.

Music videos were released for the tracks "Last Dayz", "All We Got Iz Us", "Walk In New York" and "Live Niguz".

== Appearance in movies and on television ==
- In 1995, "Betta Off Dead" was used in the movie The Addiction.
- In 1995, the song "Shout" appeared on the promo soundtrack for the movie Bad Boys.
- In 1995, the song "Live Niguz" appeared in the soundtrack to the documentary The Show
- In 2002, the instrumental of "Last Dayz" was used in the film "8 Mile" during the rap battle scenes.

== Critical response ==
Professional ratings
Review scores
| Source | Rating |
|---|---|
| AllMusic | 3/5 stars |
| Muzik | 3.5/5 stars |
| NME | 7/10 |
| Q | 3/5 stars |
| RapReviews | 9.5/10 |
| The Source | 3.5/5 stars |

All We Got Iz Us was met with generally positive reviews from music critics. Raymond Cunningham of The Source gave the album three and a half stars out of five, saying "...Although the LP is packed with sure shots, there are a few sure misses. "Shout", which has no business being on the LP, has a solid beat. But the hook is as corny as the Onyx comic book. Then there's "All We Got", a song that discusses the streets and isn't all bad, again, until the cheesy chorus. It may be a case where the quality of the other songs brings these down. In any event, they definitely stand out as weaker representations of the group's efforts."

Q gave the album three stars out of five, saying "...The lyrics are quickfire and the sound is dense..."

Bonz Malone of Vibe said "...Now, after a two-year hiatus, they're back with All We Got Iz Us, and the shit is hardcore. "Purse Snatchers" and "Better Off Dead" are probably the wildest. It's made by thugs for thugs...spits the real poison as seen on the streets. It's intended for immature audiences, so they'll wise up and realize that all we do have is one another. People need to hear these interesting characters."

NME gave the album seven stars out of ten, saying "although there's nothing to rock the Wu's place at the top of the NY tree, Onyx sound convincingly with it. They still paint pictures of NY that turn it into a warscape, but they've deliberated their moves so as not to re-emerge as the latest rap washouts...".

Rowald Pruyn of RapReviews gave the album nine and a half stars out of ten, saying "...In Onyx' New World Order, everything is upside-down. Black is white, bad is good. Suicide? No ultimate shame, but an honorable way out of a shitty situation. People? Either bitchassniggas or punkmotherfuckas. The first group can get a bullet in the back, the second can get it in their grills. History? Miserable Slavery and rape of great-grandmothers by greedy plantation owners. Music? Selling drugs to your own people is more profitable. Future? Drop the microphone. Drop your principals. Who needs morals when you're living in hell already?"

== Accolades ==
In 1995, the album is broken down track-by-track by Onyx in Hip-Hop Connection magazine, issue #79 (September 1995). In 1996, CMJ New Music Monthly placed the album in their list 25 Best Hip-Hop Albums of 1995. In 2008, Keith Murphy of Vibe named it the best-produced album of 1995 and selected as one of the magazine's 24 Lost Rap Classics. In 2012, Ernest Baker of Complex placed the album in his list A$AP Yams' 42 Favorite Albums. In 2015, Christopher Pierznik of Medium placed the album in his list The 20 Best Hip-Hop Albums of 1995. In 2016, Dustin J. Seibert of The Root listed the album in his list 15 Truly Underrated Hip-Hop Albums. In 2016, Cis Van Beers of Hip Hop Golden Age placed the album in his list Top 40 Hip Hop Albums 1995. In 2018, Stitcher Radio dedicated an episode of their program BUMS to review Onyx's 1995 album, "All We Got Iz Us".

| Publication | Country | Accolade | Year | Rank |
|---|---|---|---|---|
| CMJ New Music Monthly | United States | 25 Best Hip-Hop Albums of 1995 | 1996 | * |
| Vibe | United States | 24 Lost Rap Classics | 2008 | * |
| Complex | United States | A$AP Yams' 42 Favorite Albums | 2012 | * |
| Medium | United States | The 20 Best Hip-Hop Albums of 1995 | 2015 | * |
| The Root | United States | 15 Truly Underrated Hip-Hop Albums | 2016 | 1 |
| Hip Hop Golden Age | United States | Top 40 Hip Hop Albums 1995 | 2016 | * |

== Track listing ==
.

| # | Title | Performer(s) | Producer(s) | Samples | Length |
|---|---|---|---|---|---|
| 1 | "Life Or Death" (Skit) | Sticky Fingaz | Fredro Starr; Sticky Fingaz; Sonee Seeza; 8-Off Assassin (co-producer) | "Throw Ya Gunz" by Onyx | 0:48 |
| 2 | "Last Dayz" | Intro: Sticky Fingaz; First verse: Fredro Starr; Second verse: Sonee Seeza; Third verse: Sticky Fingaz | Fredro Starr | "Love Lips" by Bob James and Earl Klugh; "A Song for You" by Aretha Franklin; "Outside Love" by Brethren; Dialogue from Menace II Society | 3:56 |
| 3 | "All We Got Iz Us (Evil Streets)" | Intro: Fredro Starr, Sonee Seeza; First / sixth verse: Fredro Starr; Second / fourth verse: Sonee Seeza; Chorus: P.I.; Third / fifth verse: Sticky Fingaz | Fredro Starr | | 4:12 |
| 4 | "Purse Snatchaz" | Intro: Onyx; Chorus: Greg Valentine; First verse: Fredro Starr; Second verse: Sonee Seeza; Third verse: Sticky Fingaz | Fredro Starr; Sticky Fingaz; Sonee Seeza | "Love Is My Life" by Jimmy McGriff; "Ain't No Sunshine" by Bill Withers | 4:07 |
| 5 | "Shout" | First / sixth / seventh verse: Fredro Starr; Second / fourth / eighth verse: Sonee Seeza; Third / fifth / ninth verse: Sticky Fingaz | Fredro Starr | "Tryin' to Get the Feeling Again" by Hubert Laws; "Just Rhymin' With Biz" by Big Daddy Kane feat. Biz Markie | 3:47 |
| 6 | "I Murder U" (Skit) | Fredro Starr | Fredro Starr | "Handclapping Song" by The Meters | 0:22 |
| 7 | "Betta Off Dead" | Intro: Onyx; First / fourth verse: Sonee Seeza; Second / fifth verse: Fredro Starr; Third / sixth verse: Sticky Fingaz | Fredro Starr; Sticky Fingaz; Sonee Seeza; 8-Off Assassin (co-producer) | "Slow Dance" by Stanley Clarke; "Throw Ya Gunz" by Onyx | 4:04 |
| 8 | "Live Niguz" | Intro: Onyx; First verse: Sonee Seeza; Second / chorus: Fredro Starr; Third verse: Sticky Fingaz | Fredro Starr | "Wherever You Are" by Isaac Hayes; "I Like Funky Music" by Uncle Louie; "Kool Is Back" by Funk, Inc. | 3:19 |
| 9 | "Punkmotherfukaz" | Intro: Sticky Fingaz; First verse: Fredro Starr; Second verse: Sticky Fingaz; Third verse: Sonee Seeza | Fredro Starr; Sticky Fingaz; Sonee Seeza; 8-Off Assassin (co-producer) | "Long Red" by Mountain; "Christmas Rappin'" by Kurtis Blow; "Hold It Now" by Simon Harris | 1:00 |
| 10 | "Most Def" | Intro: Sonee Seeza; First verse: Sticky Fingaz; Chorus: Onyx; Second verse: Fredro Starr; Third verse: Sonee Seeza | Fredro Starr | | 3:55 |
| 11 | "Act Up" (Skit) | Sticky Fingaz | Sticky Fingaz | | 0:23 |
| 12 | "Getto Mentalitee" | First verse: Fredro Starr; Second verse: Greg Valentine; Third verse: Sonee Seeza; Fourth verse: J. Mega; Fifth verse: P.I.; Sixth verse: Sticky Fingaz | Fredro Starr | "School Boy Crush" by Average White Band | 4:22 |
| 13 | "2 Wrongs" | Intro: Onyx; Chorus: Sticky Fingaz; First verse: Fredro Starr; Second verse: Sonee Seeza; Third verse: Sticky Fingaz | Sticky Fingaz | "Throw Ya Gunz" by Onyx | 3:58 |
| 14 | "Maintain" (Skit) | Onyx, All City, P.I. | Fredro Starr | "Down by the River" by Buddy Miles | 1:56 |
| 15 | "Walk in New York" | Intro: Fredro Starr; First / fourth verse: Fredro Starr; Second / third verse: Sonee Seeza; Fifth verse: Sticky Fingaz | Fredro Starr | "Sweet Earth Flying, Pt. 1" by Marion Brown; "Top Billin'" by Audio Two | 4:55 |

== Personnel ==
- Onyx - performer, vocals, producer
- Fredro Starr - performer, vocals, producer
- Sticky Fingaz - performer, vocals, producer
- Sonee Seeza - performer, vocals, scratches
- Panama P.I. - performer, vocals
- Greg Valentine - performer, vocals
- All City - performer, vocals
- Jason Mizell - executive producer
- Randy Allen - executive producer
- 8-Off The Assassin - co-producer
- Don Elliott - mix engineer
- Rich Keller - mix engineer
- Flamboyant - scratches ("2 Wrongs" and "Walk In New York")
- Tony Dawsey - mastering
- Jaye Battle - project coordinator

== Charts ==
=== Weekly charts ===
| Chart (1995) | Peak position |
|---|---|
| US Billboard 200 | 22 |
| US Top R&B/Hip-Hop Albums (Billboard) | 2 |
| US Top 100 Pop Albums (Cashbox) | 34 |
| US Top 75 R&B Albums (Cashbox) | 24 |
| US Top 75 One-Stop Albums Chart (Cashbox) | 35 |
| US Gavin Rap Retail (Gavin Report) | 10 |
