= Shut 'Em Down (album) =

Studio album by Onyx
- Released: June 2, 1998
- Studio: Streetlight (New York City); Sound On (New York City); Track (North Hollywood, California)
- Genre: East Coast hip-hop; hardcore hip-hop
- Length: 70:46
- Label: JMJ; Def Jam
- Producer: Onyx (exec.); Jam Master Jay (exec.); Randy Allen (exec.); Keith Horne; DJ Scratch; Bud'da; Latief

Onyx chronology
All We Got Iz Us (1995)	Shut 'Em Down (1998)	Bacdafucup Part II (2002)

Singles from Shut 'Em Down
- 1. "The Worst" Released: December 23, 1997; 2. "Shut 'Em Down" Released: February 6, 1998; 3. "React" Released: June 2, 1998; 4. "Broke Willies / Ghetto Starz" Released: September 1998

Shut 'Em Down is the third studio album by American hip hop group Onyx, released on June 2, 1998, by JMJ Records and Def Jam. The album was produced by Keith Horne and Self, with help from DJ Scratch of EPMD, Bud'da and Latief. The album features guest appearances from Onyx's affiliate X1, DMX, a then-unknown 50 Cent, Still Livin from Gang Green, All City, Mr. Cheeks, Wu-Tang Clan, N.O.R.E., Big Pun and others.

Shut 'Em Down debuted at number 10 on the U.S. Billboard 200, and number 3 on the Top R&B/Hip Hop Albums chart and sold 90,000 copies in its first week. The album features three the Billboard singles The Worst, Shut 'Em Down and React. The album sold fairly well, moving over 500,000 units.

"Shut 'Em Down" was the last album released by Onyx on Def Jam / JMJ Records, and Onyx were also officially removed from Def Jam on "Black Thursday" - January 21, 1999 - because the label PolyGram, who in 1994 purchased 50% of Sony's Def Jam, was sold to Seagram on December 10, 1998.

== Background ==
"Shut 'Em Down" was originally supposed to be released on March 17, 1998, but was delayed until April 17, then May 19, and was finally released on June 2. Chyskillz was originally picked as the main producer of the third album. This was written in the "Billboard Magazine" on July 13, 1996.

In February 1998, in an interview for MTV over the phone line, Sticky Fingaz told about the new album:

"...It's like a combination of both of the (first two) albums taken to the next level. All We Got Iz Us was more narcissistic, it was a dark album. This one has elements of both, style flipping. We got appearances by Nas and Wu-Tang".

== Recording and production ==
The album was recorded in New York City and Los Angeles. The album features guest spots from Onyx's affiliate X1, DMX, Chocolate, Clay The Raider (also known as Scarred 4 Life), 50 Cent, Bonifucco, Still Livin' from Gang Green, Sunshine, Bubba Smith, All City's J. Mega and Greg Valentine, Mr. Cheeks, Killa Sin, Method Man, Raekwon, N.O.R.E. and Big Pun. Most of the album was produced by Self and Keith Horne, with help from DJ Scratch on the songs "Street Nigguz", "Conspiracy" and "Black Dust", Bud'da also produced the songs "React" and "Ghetto Starz". Latief made music for collaboration with Wu-Tang Clan called "The Worst".

According to Keith Horne, one of the producers of the album "Shut 'Em Down", this album was technically the fourth studio album by Onyx. It was recorded a lot of songs for two albums, but eventually only one album was released. Keith Horne made 11 songs with Onyx, but only 5 of them were included on the album. "Take That" was cut from the album to not make a double album. The song "Broke Willies" samples a portion of Rolling Stones's song Miss You.

Self was introduced to the group by Onyx's road manager Eat 'Em Up. Self did seven tracks for their third album Shut 'Em Down, but only five of them were placed on the album. He produced the single Shut 'Em Down, the first record with DMX. He also produced the remix for this song featuring Big Pun.

== Shut 'Em Down (Exclusive Advance) ==
Def Jam released a promo release on the CD in the cardboard sleeve "Shut 'Em Down (Exclusive Advance)" in February 1998. The contents of this CD differed significantly from the final version of the album: "Broke Willies" was originally called "Stones", "Rob & Vic" was originally called "Love Of Money" (and had a completely different beat), the song "I Don't Wanna Die" was later removed (since R. Kelly did not give permission for using his chorus), there was a X1 verse in the song "Ghetto Starz", "Overshine" was not a hidden track, in the song "Black Dust" the line from Sonny Seeza's verse was cut, "The Worst" was named "Onyx vs. Wu-Tang". In addition, the original cover of the album was too similar to the cover of the album "All We Got Iz Us" and the members of Onyx thought that people could get confused, so they changed it

== The 1998 Grammy Awards ==
The 40th Annual Grammy Awards, were held on February 25, 1998, at Radio City Music Hall, New York City. Sticky Fingaz told Ol' Dirty Bastard of his plan to take over the stage to promote Onyx's new album "Shut 'Em Down" at that evening the Grammys were going to take place.

"...This time I need to promote 'Shut 'Em Down' album... Me and my DJ LS One, we ain't even have tickets to the Grammys... we just walked through security, talking to each other like we supposed to be here... I went to the bathroom, I washed my hands and I'm looking at the mirror and saw a nigga ODB, I'm like 'Who the fuck is this? What up my nigga! Yo, I'm about to go shut this shit down, basically go onstage and promote the motherfucking album' and I told the nigga my plan, he's like, 'Alright! Let's go! Do it!'. Along the way, I stopped to talk to a motherfucking bitch... ODB was with U-God. I was with LS One, so I asked 'Yo! LS, where's this nigga Dirty go?'. He's like 'I don't know'. We walk into the auditorium, open the door, and who the fuck do I see onstage? ODB. I'm like, 'This motherfucker stole my shit and did it without me?'".

Ol' Dirty stole his idea and did it without him. Shawn Colvin's trip to the podium to pick up her award for Song of the Year was interrupted by the Wu-Tang Clan's Ol' Dirty Bastard who stole the mic to praise his group, and his new clothes, after Wu-Tang lost the Grammy Award for Best Rap Album. The album in question was Wu-Tang Forever. They lost to Puff Daddy's "No Way Out". O.D.B. urged the crowd to "Please calm down," and launched into a confusing speech thusly:

"...I went and bought me an outfit today that cost me a lot of money, because I figured that Wu-Tang was gonna win. I don't know how you all see it, but when it comes to the children, Wu-Tang is for the children. We teach the children. Puffy is good, but Wu-Tang is the best. I want you all to know that this is ODB, and I love you all, peace".

This incident was immortalized by Sticky Fingaz in the song "Shut 'Em Down Remix": "They scared to death mothafuckas trying to ban me / I'm the one who told Ol' Dirty to shut down the Grammys".

== Def Jam promo campaigns ==
In 1997, Def Jam released a series of 5 audio cassettes entitled "The Unstoppable Def Jam Sampler": Foxy Brown, LL Cool J, Method Man, Redman, EPMD. On each cassette was pictured one artist of Def Jam in the form of a comic book character. The packaging opened like a pack of cigarettes. All the tapes had the same 11 tracks from the artists of the label Def Jam. On all cassettes there was the same Onyx's track "Face Down" from the upcoming album "Shut 'Em Down".

In May 1998, as part of its "Survival Of The Illest" campaign, Def Jam released a series of 3 CDs called "Survival Of The Illest", vol. 1/2/3 (Limited Collector's Edition CD). The first such promotional CD was released as a bonus CD of DMX's album "It's Dark And Hell Is Hot", released on May 19, 1998. It included 11 tracks of Onyx, 10 of which were on the album "Shut 'Em Down". Another track is the freestyle "See You In Hell, Pt.2", recorded for DJ Clue's mixtape "The Curse Of The Clue" (1997), this freestyle can also be found on the compilation Cold Case Files Vol. 1 (2008). The second promo CD was released as a bonus disc of Onyx's album "Shut 'Em Down" on June 2, 1998. The third promo CD was released as a bonus disc of Def Squad's album "El Niño", released on June 30, 1998.

In May 1998, as part of its "Survival Of The Illest" campaign, Def Jam released a series of 2 vinyl records called "Survival Of The Illest", vol. 1 and vol. 2, which included new tracks from DMX, Onyx and Def Squad. The 1st collection includes Onyx's tracks from the album "Shut 'Em Down": "React" (Radio Edit) and "React" (TV Track). The 2nd collection includes Onyx's tracks from the album "Shut 'Em Down": "Broke Willies" (Radio Edit) and "Broke Willies" (TV Track).

In 1999, Def Jam released a series of 8 CDs titled "The Unstoppable Def Jam Sampler": Redman, Foxy Brown, Public Enemy, DMX, ONYX, LL Cool J, Method Man, EPMD. On each disc was one rapper of Def Jam in the form of a comic book character. On each disc there were 6 tracks from the artists of the label. On the discs "Method Man" and "EPMD" there was a freestyle called "See You In Hell" by Onyx, recorded for DJ Clue's mixtape in 1997.

In 1999, Def Jam released a series of 2 CDs entitled "The Unstoppable Def Jam Sampler", vol I and vol II. On each disc, 4 artists of the Def Jam label were shown in the form of comic book characters. On each disc there were 12 tracks from the artists of the label. On the first CD there was a freestyle called "See You In Hell" by Onyx, recorded for DJ Clue's mixtape in 1997.

== The last album on Def Jam ==
"Shut 'Em Down" is the last album released by Onyx on Def Jam. JMJ Records as well as Onyx were officially removed from Def Jam on "Black Thursday" - January 21, 1999 - because the label PolyGram, who in 1994 purchased 50% of Sony's Def Jam, was sold to Seagram on December 10, 1998.

Only four years earlier, Onyx were "saving Def Jam", as Sticky Fingaz put it, but now they were hoping the label would save them. Their third—and what would become their final—album on Def Jam, "Shut 'Em Down", barely went gold.

"...Our unity with [Jam Master] Jay was broken, our unity with the label was broken", says Sticky, who came by the office one day and threw a tantrum. "I flipped out, pulling plaques off the wall, throwing shit around, mad", he remembers.

== Singles ==
Four singles were released from this album: "The Worst", "Shut 'Em Down", "React", "Broke Willies".

The first single, "The Worst" featuring Wu-Tang Clan's Method Man, Raekwon and their affiliate Killa Sin was released, December 23, 1997. The song appeared on the Ride soundtrack. Fredro Starr and Sticky Fingaz also starred in this movie "Ride", which was originally called "I-95". The song peaked at #6 on the "Hot Dance Music/Maxi-Singles Sales" for two weeks, #22 on the "Hot Rap Singles" for two weeks, and #64 on the Billboard's "Hot R&B/Hip-Hop Songs" for two weeks. The video was directed by Diane Martel and depicts a post-apocalyptic world where rap is banned. The video was filmed in Chinatown, Manhattan, New York City (Ipoh Garden Malaysian Chinese) in December 1997 and was released on "The BOX" on March 14, 1998.

In February 1998, in an interview for MTV, Sticky Fingaz told about collaborating with Wu-Tang:

"...It was a collaboration. Working on the soundtrack was a lot like the tour we did with them, we're on the same vibe... It's about the worst of the worst, meaning the best. We're the worst nightmare for everyone in hip-hop. That shit is fucking right".

The second single, "Shut 'Em Down" featuring DMX was released on February 6, 1998. Single was released with a promo sticker "From the forthcoming album 'Shut 'Em Down' in stores March 17, 1998". The song debuted at #43 on the "Hot Rap Singles" on February 7, 1998, peaked at #26 on the "Hot Dance Music/Maxi-Singles Sales" for two weeks, and #61 on the Billboard's "Hot R&B/Hip-Hop Songs".

In the interview on "White Label Radio", Fredro Starr told a story about how Onyx recorded the title track. DMX came to the NYC's studio, "Sound On Sound Studios, to record the song "Shut 'Em Down" accompanied by his pitbulls and members of Ruff Ryders, but on the shooting of a video in Downtown Los Angeles, he arrived alone with the dogs!

The video was directed by Gregory Dark and was filmed in Downtown Los Angeles in December 1997 and was released on "The BOX" in February 1998.

The third single, "React" featuring Bonifucco, X1, 50 Cent and Still Livin was released on June 2, 1998. The song peaked at #44 on the "Hot Rap Singles", and #62 on the Billboard's "Hot R&B/Hip-Hop Songs".

"React" was debut directorial video of the famous director Little X and premiered in "Rap City" (aired on BET)

50 Cent spoke on his appearance in the video "React" when asked about the last time he went ice-skating.

"...It's been a long time," 50 Cent said. "It actually was the Onyx video. I had to learn for the video. I didn't know why. I was like 'What the—?' I asked them to put me in the box. Like an actual [penalty box]".

The fourth single, "Broke Willies / Ghetto Starz" featuring X1 and Mr. Cheeks was released in September 1998 with a promo sticker "The next single from the gold album Shut 'Em Down '98". An alternative radio version of the song "Broke Willies" was released on the singles "React" and "Broke Willies". Dirty single version is still not released.

The video was directed by Little X on August 1, and premiered in "Rap City" (aired on BET) in September 1998.

The Queens, N.Y., natives give R. Kelly's "I Believe I Can Fly" a macabre reworking, offering a somewhat controlled version of their seemingly endless rage.

In February 1998, in an interview for MTV over the phone line, Fredro Starr told about the meaning of the song "Raze It Up":

"...'Raise It Up' is about representing wherever you at, representing this real hip-hop shit, so wherever you are on the other end, you can hear it and know we know what's going on".

== Original versions ==
In 2012, the original full version of the song "Take That" was found. The song contains verses from Fredro Starr and Sonny Seeza, which were cut down on the album. Also, original versions of the songs "Raze It Up" and "Broke Willies" were found, originally called "We Comin' Thru Ya'll". Both songs contain completely different lyrics. All these songs were included in the compilation Cold Case Files Vol. 2.

In 2016, the original version of the song "Shut 'Em Down Remix" was found. The song contains completely different lyrics from all the members of the group. There's also a verse from X1 that did not get on the album.

== Tribute ==
In 2005, "Shut 'Em Down (Remix)" was featured in the video game Grand Theft Auto: Liberty City Stories.

In 2012, the Mongolian hip-hop group Ice Top recorded a cover version of the song "Shut 'Em Down Remix" by Onyx called "Shartai" and then filmed a video for this track.

In 2014, Onyx released an album called #WakeDaFucUp that included a song called "The Tunnel" dedicated to the NYC's club "The Tunnel" in which the group performed several times. In 1998, Onyx was at the club "The Tunnel" on Sunday May 31, 1998, where they come to present their new album "Shut 'Em Down" which was released after 2 days on Tuesday, June 2, 1998.

In 2017, in honor of 19th anniversary of Onyx's album "Shut 'Em Down" Atlanta's rapper Sick Flo, who's also a member of Onyx's movement "100 MAD", released a tribute video called "Shut 'Em Down".

== Critical response ==
Professional ratings
Review scores
Source	Rating
AllMusic	2.5/5 stars
Rolling Stone	3/5 stars
The Source	3.5/5 stars

Shut Em Down was met with generally positive reviews from music critics. Judson Kilpatrick of Vibe magazine saying "On their third album, Shut 'Em Down. Onyx still sound loud, grimy, and angry. But their usual cutthroat lyric barrages are now balanced by a few mellow tracks, such as “Ghetto Starz” (which features the radio-friendly Lost Boyz rapping over Queen’s thumping 1980 “Another One Bites the Dust”). Onyx even transform the O'Jays’ 1973 “For the Love of Money” into a self-help message rap-albeit one filled with graphic violence. As Sticky Fingaz says on the title track, “If men are dogs / I'm the Rottweiler.” Shut ’Em Down is worthy. This time their beats are slightly more delicate, but Onyx are anything but soft."

Soren Baker of The Source gave the album three and a half stars out of five, saying "Their third opus, Shut 'Em Down, arrives with a sound and attitude that lies somewhere between their first two projects. The excitement of “Raze It Up” and the gut-busting title track (which features yet another blazing performance from DМХ) will appeal to those thirsting for the rougher side of things. Onyx occasionally falter with their attempts at capturing the R&B/hip-hop aesthetic. Evidently, after watching most of their peers win with club songs, the bald-headed wonders decided to follow suit. “Ghetto Starz” features a guest appearance from the always lively Lost Boyz, while R. Kelly's “I Believe I Can Fly” gets a ghetto revamping on the bizarre “I Don't Wanna Die”. No question. the group is better suited when they stick to their guns and leave that club shit to P-Diddy and his Family. Flaunting a more expanded musical repertoire. Onyx's 'Shut 'Еm Down' will probably not overtake the current commercial stance of the rap game, but, for the most part, it serves as an appealing reminder of why this Q-borough crew blew up in the first place.

"Shut 'Em Down" is a favorite album of Onyx's Sticky Fingaz.

== Track listing ==
#	Title	Performer(s)	Producer(s)	Samples	Length
01.	"It Was Onyx" (Skit)	Sticky Fingaz	Onyx		0:48
02.	"Raze It Up"	Chorus: Sticky Fingaz; First verse: Fredro Starr; Second verse: Sonny Seeza; Third verse: Sticky Fingaz	Keith Horne; Onyx (co-producer)	contains elements from "Throw Ya Gunz" by Onyx	4:00
03.	"Street Nigguz"	Chorus: Sticky Fingaz; First verse: X1; Second verse: Fredro Starr; Third verse: Sonny Seeza; Fourth verse: Sticky Fingaz	DJ Scratch		4:54
04.	"Shut 'Em Down"	First verse: Fredro Starr; Second verse: Sonny Seeza; Third verse: DMX; Fourth verse: Sticky Fingaz	Self		3:58
05.	"Broke Willies"	Chorus: X1 & Sticky Fingaz; First verse: Fredro Starr & X1; Second verse: Sticky Fingaz & Sonny Seeza; Third verse: Fredro Starr, X1, Sonny Seeza, Sticky Fingaz	Keith Horne; Onyx (co-producer)	contains a sample from "Miss You" by The Rolling Stones	3:49
06.	"For Nothin'" (Skit)	Sticky Fingaz	Onyx		0:18
07.	"Rob & Vic"	Intro: Sticky Fingaz; First verse: Sticky Fingaz & X1; Second verse: Sticky Fingaz & X1; Third verse: Sticky Fingaz & X1; Chorus: Choclatt Jared	Keith Horne	contains resung elements of "For The Love Of Money" by The O'Jays; contains portions of "Theme From King Of New York" by Joe Delia	4:54
08.	"Face Down"	First verse: Fredro Starr; Second verse: Sticky Fingaz; Third verse: Sonny Seeza	Self	contains a sample from "Rampage" by EPMD (feat. LL Cool J)	4:40
09.	"Cops" (Skit)	Sticky Fingaz	Onyx		0:51
10.	"Conspiracy"	Intro: Sticky Fingaz; Chorus: Fredro Starr; First verse: X1; Second verse: Sonny Seeza; Third verse: Clay The Raider; Fourth verse: Sticky Fingaz	DJ Scratch		4:31
11.	"Black Dust"	First verse: Sonny Seeza; Chorus: Fredro Starr & Sonny Seeza; Second verse: Fredro Starr; Third verse: X1; Fourth verse: Sticky Fingaz	DJ Scratch		3:54
12.	"One Nation" (Skit)	Sticky Fingaz	Onyx		0:37
13.	"React"	Chorus: Still Livin; First verse: Bonifucco; Second verse: Sonny Seeza; Third verse: Fredro Starr; Fourth verse: 50 Cent; Fifth verse: X1; Sixth verse: Sticky Fingaz; Outro: Clay The Raider	Bud'da		4:09
14.	"Veronica"	Fredro Starr; Sticky Fingaz; Sonny Seeza; Tracy 'Sunshine' Woodall	Self; Clay The Raider (co-producer)	contains elements from "Spooky" by Cal Tjader	4:29
15.	"Fuck Dat"	Intro / Outro: Fredro Starr; First verse: J. Mega (of All City); Second verse: Greg Valentine (of All City); Third verse: Sticky Fingaz; Fourth verse: Bubba Smith; Fifth verse: X1	Self		4:58
16.	"Ghetto Starz"	Intro: Fredro Starr; First verse: Fredro Starr; Chorus: Mr. Cheeks; Second verse: Mr. Cheeks; Third verse: Sonny Seeza; Fourth verse: Sticky Fingaz	Bud'da	contains replayed elements of "Christmas Rappin'" by Kurtis Blow	3:34
17.	"Take That"	Sticky Fingaz	Keith Horne		1:27
18.	"The Worst"	First verse: Raekwon; Second verse: Fredro Starr; Third verse: X1; Fourth verse: Sonny Seeza; Fifth verse: Killa Sin; Sixth verse: Sticky Fingaz; Seventh verse: Method Man	Latief		5:34
18b.	"Overshine"	First verse: Sticky Fingaz; Chorus: All City (J. Mega and Greg Valentine); Second verse: Fredro Starr; Third verse: Sonny Seeza	Keith Horne	contains elements from *"Here We Go Again" by The Isley Brothers	3:59
19.	"Shut 'Em Down" (Remix)	First verse: Noreaga; Second verse: Sonny Seeza; Third verse: Fredro Starr; Fourth verse: Big Pun; Fifth verse: Sticky Fingaz	Self		4:14

Notes

- "The Worst" contains a hidden track - "Overshine" which is track 18b here.

== Personnel ==
Credits for Shut 'Em Down adapted from AllMusic and CD booklet.

- Onyx — executive producer, primary artist, producer
- Jason Mizell — executive producer
- Randy Allen — executive producer
- Irv Gotti — A&R direction
- Khary "Eat 'Em Up" Lee — A&R direction
- Aaron Seawood — management
- Tom Coyne — mastering
- Jazz Young — marketing
- The Drawing Board — art direction, design
- Clay McBride — photography
- Connie Johnson — stylist
- Lydia High — project coordinator
- DJ LS One — scratches
- DMX — guest artist, performer, primary artist
- The Lost Boyz — guest artist
- Method Man — vocals
- Raekwon — vocals
- Bubba Smith — vocals
- Bud'da — producer
- DJ Scratch — producer
- Keith Horne — producer
- Patrick Viala — remixing
- Tony Black — mixing, remixing
- Don Elliott — engineer, mixing
- Ken "Duro" Ifill — engineer, mixing
- Vinny Nicoletti — mixing
- John Klemmer — sample source
- J.R. Cobb — composer
- Lowell Fulson — composer
- Erin Hinson — composer
- Ernie Isley — composer
- Chris Jasper — composer
- K. Jones — composer
- Jimmy McCracklin — composer
- Mr. Cheeks — composer
- J.B. Moore — composer
- Richard Rodgers — composer
- Fred Scruggs — composer
- Clifford Smith — composer
- George Spivey — composer
- T. Taylor — composer
- K. Walker — composer
- C. Woods — composer

== Charts ==
=== Weekly charts ===
Chart (1998)	Peak position
US Billboard 200	10
US Top R&B/Hip-Hop Albums (Billboard)	3
UK Albums (Official Charts Company)	136

=== Singles chart positions ===
Year	Song	Chart positions		
Year	Song	Hot R&B/Hip-Hop Singles & Tracks	Hot Rap Singles	Hot Dance Music/Maxi-Singles Sales
1997	The Worst	64	22	6
1998	Shut 'Em Down	61	43	26
1998	React	62	44	-
