= Shut 'em Down (Onyx song) =

"Shut 'Em Down"

Single by Onyx featuring DMX

from the album Shut 'Em Down
- B-side: "Raze It Up"
- Released: February 3, 1998
- Recorded: 1997
- Studio: Sound On Sound Studios, NYC
- Genre: Hardcore hip-hop
- Length: 3:58
- Label: JMJ; Def Jam
- Songwriters: Fred Scruggs; Kirk Jones; Tyrone Taylor; Edward Hinson; Earl Simmons
- Producer: Self

Onyx singles chronology
"The Worst" (1997)	"Shut 'Em Down" (1998)	"React" (1998)

DMX singles chronology
"4, 3, 2, 1" (1997)	"Shut 'em Down" (1998)	"Get at Me Dog" (1998)

"Shut 'Em Down" is a song by American hip hop group Onyx. It was released on February 3, 1998, by Def Jam and JMJ Records as the second single from Onyx's third album, Shut 'Em Down. The song featured labelmate DMX.

Produced by Self, Shut 'Em Down was successful on the R&B and rap charts, peaking at 61 on the US Billboard's Hot R&B/Hip-Hop Singles & Tracks and 43 on the US Hot Rap Singles.

The official remix, which also appeared on the Shut 'Em Down album, featured rappers, Noreaga and Big Pun and was featured in the 2005 video game, Grand Theft Auto: Liberty City Stories.

== Background ==
In the interview on "White Label Radio", Fredro Starr told a story about how Onyx recorded the title track. DMX came to the NYC's studio, "Sound On Sound Studios, to record the song "Shut 'Em Down" accompanied by his pitbulls and members of Ruff Ryders, but on the shooting of a video in Downtown Los Angeles, he arrived alone with the dogs!

== Music video ==
The music video was directed by Gregory Dark and was filmed in Downtown Los Angeles in December 1997 and was released on "The BOX" in February 1998.

The video can be found on the 2008's DVD Onyx: 15 Years Of Videos, History And Violence.

== In popular culture ==
- In 2001, instrumental of this song was used in Santa Cruz - Uprising, the movie by Santa Cruz Skateboards about skateboarding.
- In 2005, "Shut 'Em Down (Remix)" has been featured in the video game Grand Theft Auto: Liberty City Stories.

== Tribute ==
In 2012, the Mongolian hip-hop group Ice Top recorded a cover version of the song "Shut 'Em Down Remix" by Onyx called "Shartai" and then filmed a video for this track.

In 2017, in honor of 19th anniversary of Onyx's album "Shut 'Em Down" Atlanta's rapper Sick Flo, who also a member of Onyx's movement "100 MAD", released a tribute video "Shut 'Em Down".

== Releases ==
Single was released with a promo sticker "From the forthcoming album 'Shut 'Em Down' in stores March 17, 1998".

=== 12" vinyl single track listing ===
A-Side:

1. "Shut 'Em Down" (Radio Edit)- 3:26 (featuring DMX)
2. "Shut 'Em Down" (LP Version)- 3:59 (featuring DMX)
3. "Shut 'Em Down" (Instrumental)- 3:53

B-Side:

1. "Raze It Up" (Radio Edit)- 4:03
2. "Raze It Up" (LP Version)- 4:03
3. "Raze It Up" (Instrumental)- 4:03

C-Side:

1. "Throw Ya Gunz" (Radio Edit)- 3:16
2. "Throw Ya Gunz" (LP Version)- 4:02
3. "Throw Ya Gunz" (Instrumental)- 4:12
4. "Shifftee" (LP Version)- 3:18

D-Side:

1. "Last Dayz" (Radio Edit)- 3:32
2. "Last Dayz" (LP Version)- 3:31
3. "Last Dayz" (Instrumental)- 3:31
4. "Evil Streets" (Remix)- 4:18 (featuring Method Man)

=== CD promo single track listing ===
1. "Shut 'Em Down" (Radio Edit)- 3:26

== Samples ==
- "Vieillir" by Jacques Brel

== Personnel ==
- Onyx - performer, vocals
- Fredro Starr - performer, vocals, producer ("Last Dayz")
- Sticky Fingaz - performer, vocals
- Sonny Seeza - performer, vocals
- Self - producer ("Shut 'Em Down")
- Ken "DURO" Ifill - engineer ("Shut 'Em Down")
- DJ LS One - engineer, scratches ("Shut 'Em Down")
- Tom Coyne - mastering
- Keith Horne - producer ("Raze It Up")
- Don Elliot - engineer ("Raze It Up", "Last Dayz")
- Chyskillz - producer ("Shifftee", "Throw Ya Gunz")
- Troy Hightower - engineer ("Throw Ya Gunz")
- Norman Bullard - assistant engineer ("Throw Ya Gunz")
- Jam Master Jay - producer ("Shifftee")
- Rich July - engineer ("Shifftee", "Throw Ya Gunz")
- Swift - engineer ("Evil Streets" (Remix))

== Critical reception ==
Christopher Pierznik of Medium noted that Sticky Fingaz "outperformed everyone, including red-hot guest DMX, on the album's title track". The song was also praised in a retrospective review by Boom Bap Reviews, which lauded Self's production as "one of his two best beats ever" and highlighted DMX's versatile contribution as a "team player" on the track.

== Charts ==
Chart	Position
US Hot R&B/Hip-Hop Singles & Tracks (Billboard)	61
US Hot Rap Singles (Billboard)	43
US Hot Dance Music/Maxi-Singles Sales (Billboard)	26
UK Singles (Official Charts Company)	136
