= Last Dayz =

Single by Onyx

from the album All We Got Iz Us
- B-side: "All We Got Iz Us"
- Released: October 3, 1995
- Studio: LGK Studios, Leonia, New Jersey
- Genre: East Coast hip hop; hardcore hip hop; horrorcore
- Length: 3:32
- Label: JMJ; Rush
- Songwriters: Fred Scruggs; Kirk Jones; Tyrone Taylor; Earl Klugh
- Producer: Fredro Starr

Onyx singles chronology
"Live!!!" (1995)	"Last Dayz" (1995)	"The Worst" (1997)

Music video
- "Last Dayz" on YouTube

"Last Dayz" is a song by American hip hop group Onyx. It was released on October 3, 1995 by JMJ Records and Rush Associated Labels as the second single from Onyx's second album, All We Got Iz Us.

Produced by Fredro Starr, "Last Dayz" making it to number 89 on the US Billboard Hot 100. The song was sampled by more than 10 rap artists including Jus Allah, Jedi Mind Tricks, Immortal Technique, and Vinnie Paz.

In 2013, the song was re-recorded by Onyx, and released on a compilation album Songs of the 90's.

== Music video ==
The music video was directed by Joseph Kahn, Barry Shapiro was a producer of this video. The video was filmed in an Industrial Park, New York City, and was premiered on The BOX on October 20, 1995. The video can be found on the 2008's DVD Onyx: 15 Years Of Videos, History And Violence.

== Incident in Newark ==
- In 1996, riot broke out at Onyx's concert during the performance "Last Dayz" in Newark, New Jersey. Fredro Starr told everybody in the audience that, they got the power to take over the world. They could do what the fuck they want to do. When Fredro said that, the whole crowd got vibrant.

== Appearance in movies ==
- In 2002, instrumental of this song was used in the film 8 Mile for the rap battle between Lotto and B-Rabbit.
- In 2014, the song appeared in The Brodies, the movie by Jeremy Elkin about skateboarding.

== Appearance on television ==
- In 1995, "Last Dayz" was performed live on a daytime tabloid talk show Ricki Lake on December 13, 1995.
- In 2015, Fredro Starr named "Last Dayz" as his favorite Onyx's record during interview with Steve Lobel. He also added that this is Kanye West's favorite Onyx's song too.
- In 2018, Fredro Starr said that "Last Dayz" put him on as a bonafide lyricist on B-Real's TV brand new episode of Once Upon A Rhyme.
- In 2018, the song appeared in the BET's show "Rate The Bars", in the episode with EPMD aired on July 30, 2018. On each episode of "Rate The Bars" rappers rate the bars of their peers without knowing who the lines belong to.
- In 2018, the song "Last Dayz" appeared on The Joe Budden Podcast, episode 180 "Blessed" aired on September 21, 2018.

== Cover versions ==
- In 2003, Dead Prez teamed up with Fredro Starr and Sticky Fingaz to recorded "Last Days Reloaded" for Dead Prez's mixtape Turn off the Radio: The Mixtape, Vol. 2: Get Free or Die Tryin'.

== Parodies ==
- In 2018, videographer Mylo the Cat used the song for his cartoon starring Krang from TMNT.

== Accolades ==
In 2018, The Boombox put the song in their list Rap Songs That Sample Aretha Franklin. In 2018, the song "Last Dayz" was included by WhoSampled in mix A Hip Hop Tribute to Aretha Franklin, dedicated to the memory of the Queen of Soul, Aretha Franklin, who died just under a month ago.

Publication	Country	Accolade	Year	Rank
The Boombox	United States	Rap Songs That Sample Aretha Franklin	2018	*
WhoSampled	United States	A Hip Hop Tribute to Aretha Franklin	2018	*

== Releases ==
=== CD maxi-single track listing ===
1. "Last Dayz" (LP Version)- 3:32
2. "All We Got Iz Us" (Evil Streets) (LP Version) - 4:04
3. "Walk In New York" (LP Version)- 4:55
4. "Last Dayz" (Radio Version)- 3:32
5. "All We Got Iz Us" (Evil Streets) (Radio Version) - 3:53
6. "Last Dayz" (Instrumental)- 3:32
7. "All We Got Iz Us" (Evil Streets) (Instrumental)- 4:05
8. "Last Dayz" (A Cappella)- 3:20

=== 12" vinyl single track listing ===
1. "Last Dayz" (LP Version) - 3:32
2. "Last Dayz" (Radio Version) - 3:32
3. "Last Dayz" (Instrumental) - 3:32
4. "Last Dayz" (A Cappella) - 3:20
5. "All We Got Iz Us" (Evil Streets) (LP Version) - 4:04
6. "All We Got Iz Us" (Evil Streets) (Radio Version) - 3:53
7. "All We Got Iz Us" (Evil Streets) (Instrumental)- 4:05
8. "All We Got Iz Us" (Evil Streets) (Acapella) - 3:58

=== Cassette single track listing ===
1. "Last Dayz" (LP Version)- 3:32
2. "All We Got Iz Us" (Evil Streets) (LP Version) - 4:04
3. "Walk In New York" (LP Version)- 4:55

== Samples ==
- "Love Lips" by Bob James and Earl Klugh
- "A Song for You" by Aretha Franklin
- "Outside Love" by Brethren
- Dialogue from Menace II Society

== Personnel ==
- Onyx - performer, vocals
- Fredro Starr - performer, vocals
- Sticky Fingaz - performer, vocals
- Sonee Seeza - performer, vocals, scratches ("Walk In New York")
- Flamboyant - scratches ("Walk In New York")
- Panama P.I. - additional vocals ("All We Got Iz Us")
- Jason Mizell - executive producer
- Randy Allen - executive producer
- Jaye Battle - project coordinator
- Don Elliot - engineer
- Tony Dawsey - mastering

== Charts ==
=== Weekly charts ===
Chart	Position
US Billboard Hot 100	89
US Hot R&B/Hip-Hop Singles & Tracks (Billboard)	61
US Hot Rap Singles (Billboard)	10
US Hot Dance Music/Maxi-Singles Sales (Billboard)	28
US Top 25 Rap Singles (Cashbox)	12
US Gavin Rap Retail (Gavin Report)	12
US Gavin Rap (Gavin Report)	19
