= Live Niguz =

Single by Onyx

from the album The Show and All We Got Iz Us
- B-side: "Kill Dem All"
- Released: July 18, 1995
- Recorded: 1994
- Studio: LGK Studios, Leonia, New Jersey
- Genre: East Coast hip hop; hardcore hip hop
- Length: 3:31
- Label: JMJ; Def Jam; Rush
- Songwriter(s): Fred Scruggs; Kirk Jones; Tyrone Taylor; Isaac Hayes
- Producer(s): Fredro Starr; Sticky Fingaz; Sonee Seeza

Onyx singles chronology
| "Shifftee" (1993) | "Live Niguz" (1995) | "Last Dayz" (1995) |

Music video
- "Live Niguz" on YouTube

"Live Niguz", also known by its censored title "Live!!!" is a song by American hip hop group Onyx. It was released on July 18, 1995 by Def Jam, Rush Associated Labels and JMJ Records as a single from Def Jam's The Show: The Soundtrack and as the first single from Onyx's second album, All We Got Iz Us.

Produced by all three members of Onyx, "Live!!!" only found minor success on the R&B and rap charts, becoming the group's first single not to reach the Billboard Hot 100.

== Background ==
Sticky Fingaz's verse is molded off of Slick Rick's in "La-Di-Da-Di" but flipped. For his verse, Sticky Fingaz took and redid the Slick Rick's verse from the song "La Di Da Di". Almost all the lines in a verse of Sticky begin and end with the same words as in the song by Slick Rick, but they have a completely different meaning.

In 1995, song was also included in a cassette single Onyx "Untitled".

In 2010 an original version of this song (with different intro) was found. In the beginning was dialogue between Fredro Starr and Sonee Seeza, later this part was cut from the song, and Sticky Fingaz's verse was re-recorded.

== Music video ==
The music video was directed by Diane Martel. The video was filmed in Manhattan. Prodigy, Method Man, Nas, Tyson Beckford, Keith Murray, Ja Rule and Mic Geronimo had a cameo appearance in the video. Video premiered on The BOX on Saturday, August 12, 1995. On the set of this video Prodigy and Keith Murray squashed the beef starting over record "I Shot Ya" (Remix) by LL Cool J.

Diane Martel created two versions of the video: censored for television and uncensored. In the censorship version: 1) the word "niggaz" is scraped into audio; 2) footage on which the robbers kill Sticky Fingaz at the funeral, were cut out; 3) shotgun, from which the robbers kill Sticky Fingaz, is hidden; 4) there are small differences in the lyrics of Sticky (the phrase "Kids is cruel for a cause and these fucked up conditions that we all hate but fuck it if this our fate" is replaced by "See we cruel for a cause and these dis conditions the mate when i create generate man's hate")

The video can be found on the 2008's DVD Onyx: 15 Years Of Videos, History And Violence.

== Releases ==
=== CD single track listing ===
1. "Live!!!" (LP Version)- 3:31
2. "Kill Dem All" (LP Version)- 4:47 (Kali Ranks)
3. "Live!!!" (Instrumental)- 3:31

=== 12" vinyl single track listing ===
1. "Live!!!" (LP Version)- 3:31
2. "Kill Dem All" (LP Version)- 4:47 (Kali Ranks)
3. "Live!!!" (Instrumental)- 3:31

=== 12" vinyl promo single track listing ===
1. "Live!!!" (Radio Edit)- 3:31
2. "Live!!!" (LP Version)- 3:31
3. "Kill Dem All" (LP Version)- 4:47 (Kali Ranks)
4. "Live!!!" (Instrumental)- 3:31

=== 12" vinyl promo single track listing ===
1. "Live!!!" (Clean)- 3:11
2. "Live!!!" (LP Version)- 3:22
3. "Live!!!" (A Capella)- 3:08
4. "Walk In New York" (Clean)- 4:07
5. "Walk In New York" (LP Version)- 5:00
6. "Walk In New York" (Instrumental)- 2:08

=== Cassette single track listing ===
1. "Live!!!" (LP Version)- 3:31
2. "Kill Dem All" (LP Version)- 4:47 (Kali Ranks)

== Samples ==
- "Wherever You Are" by Isaac Hayes
- "I Like Funky Music" by Uncle Louie
- "Kool Is Back" by Funk, Inc.

== Personnel ==
- Onyx - performer, vocals
- Fredro Starr - performer, vocals
- Sticky Fingaz - performer, vocals
- Sonee Seeza - performer, vocals
- Don Elliot - engineer
- Tom Coyne - mastering
- Andrew Massop - producer, engineer ("Kill Dem All")
- Marc Pomeroy - producer, engineer ("Kill Dem All")
- Element 9 - guitar, background vocals ("Kill Dem All")

== Charts ==
=== Weekly charts ===
| Chart | Position |
|---|---|
| US Hot R&B/Hip-Hop Singles & Tracks (Billboard) | 81 |
| US Hot Rap Singles (Billboard) | 17 |
| US Hot Dance Music/Maxi-Singles Sales (Billboard) | 13 |
