= Summertime in the LBC =

1995 single by The Dove Shack

Single by The Dove Shack featuring Arnita Porter

from the album This Is the Shack
- Released: June 1995
- Studio: Paramount Recording Studios (Hollywood, Los Angeles)
- Genre: West Coast hip hop; G-funk; R&B
- Length: 3:58
- Label: G-Funk; Def Jam
- Songwriters: Arnez Blount; Gary Brown; Mark Makonie; Henry "Hank" Thomas; Lamon "Sleepy" Turner
- Producers: Thomas; Turner

The Dove Shack singles chronology
"Summertime in the LBC" (1995)	"We Funk (The G Funk)" (1995)

Music video
- "Summertime in the LBC" on YouTube

"Summertime in the LBC" is the debut single by American hip hop group The Dove Shack, released in 1995 as the lead single from their debut studio album, This Is the Shack (1995). The song also appears on the soundtrack to the 1995 film The Show and features singer Arnita Porter. Produced by Henry "Hank" Thomas and Lamon "Sleepy" Turner, it samples "Feels So Good" by Midnight Star.

== Background ==
At the time that Hank Thomas and Lamon Turner produced the beat, they were living in the same apartment complex as Bo Roc and gave it to him. Bo Roc ignored it, until one of his friends came across the tape at C-Knight's grandmother's house, which the group called the "Dove Shack" and where they would hold parties. Bo Roc recalls, "He pulled me aside and said 'Man, you gotta use this.'" One day, when Arnita Porter visited Bo Roc's house, he played the beat and started writing to it. As Bo Roc sang to it, Porter chimed in and also started singing, to his surprise. Bo Roc immediately wrote Porter's verse as well.

The group was satisfied with the record, but they initially did not submit it to Def Jam Recordings. However, they then decided each member would have a solo song on the album, and Bo Roc submitted "Summertime in the LBC" as his solo. Music executive and Def Jam A&R Paul Stewart responded favorably, later recounting in an interview with Andscape, "I remember being blown away by Bo Roc's vocals. I definitely felt like it would be a hit." Bo Roc stated in the interview:

I remember the label being all hyped around "Summertime in the LBC". We actually gave resistance to them being so hyped behind the record. They were like, "Oh, this is the one," and we were like, "Oh, no it's not." We didn't want them to introduce us to the world that way. We were trying to make our name as rappers.

Def Jam also wanted the Dove Shack to submit a song for the soundtrack of The Show. The group submitted their song "Rollin Wit a Gang", but it was replaced by "Summertime in the LBC".

The label cut C-Knight and 2 Scoops' solo records from the project, but wanted "Summertime in the LBC" to be included and to have them perform on the song. Subsequently, two versions of the song were made: one with only Bo Roc and Porter performing and one with C-Knight and 2 Scoops' verses. Only the former version appears on The Show soundtrack and the latter is titled "Summertime in the LBC (Rap)" on This Is the Shack.

== Composition ==
The production is built on a sample of "Feels So Good" and contains guitar, piano and drums. Lyrically, the song revolves around life in Long Beach, California. The first version is an R&B/soul-style duet. In Bo-Roc's verse, he describes the Eastside as he knows it, referencing the gangs residing there; Arnita Porter sings about cruising in the city in a 1994 Jeep Wrangler while wearing Daisy Dukes. The second version adds short verses from C-Knight and 2 Scoops about the Dove Shack and their crew hanging out at Martin Luther King Jr. Park in Long Beach. Among the activities they mention are grilling ribs smothered in barbecue sauce, drinking beer (from 40-ounce bottles), Coca-Cola and Hennessy, and smoking marijuana.

== Critical reception ==
The song was well received by critics. Pete T. of RapReviews commented the first version "allows the versatile Bo-Roc to flex his R&B chops over a simple yet gorgeous backdrop of smooth bass and wah-wah guitars." In addition, he described it as having excellent production and hook. The Ringer included the song in their list "101 Best L.A. Rap Songs".

== Music video ==
The music video was directed by Brett Ratner and filmed in Los Angeles, since Long Beach banned the filming of hip-hop music videos. It features footage of the Dove Shack performing on rooftops and Arnita Porter and her female friends cruising in the streets.

== Charts ==
Chart (1995)	Peak position
US Billboard Hot 100	54
US Hot R&B/Hip Hop Songs (Billboard)	37
US Hot Rap Songs (Billboard)	11
US Cash Box Top 100	42
