= The Worst (Onyx and Wu-Tang Clan song) =

Single by Onyx and Wu-Tang Clan

from the album Ride and Shut 'Em Down
- Released: December 23, 1997
- Recorded: 1997
- Studio: Streetlight Studios, New York City
- Genre: East Coast hip-hop; hardcore hip-hop
- Length: 5:34
- Label: Tommy Boy
- Songwriter(s): Clifford Smith; Corey Woods; Fred Scruggs; Kirk Jones; Tyrone Taylor; Anthony Long
- Producer(s): Latief

Onyx singles chronology
"Last Dayz" (1995)	"The Worst" (1997)	"Shut 'Em Down" (1998)

Wu-Tang Clan singles chronology
"It's Yourz" (1997)	"The Worst" (1998)	"Protect Ya Neck (The Jump Off)" (2000)

Music video
- "The Worst" on YouTube

"The Worst" is a song by American hip hop groups Onyx and Wu-Tang Clan. It was released on December 23, 1997 by Tommy Boy as a single from Tommy Boy Records's Ride and as the first single from Onyx's third album, Shut 'Em Down.

Onyx is represented by Fredro Starr, Sonny Seeza and Sticky Fingaz, as well as affiliate X1. Wu-Tang Clan is represented by Method Man, Raekwon, as well as affiliate Killa Sin.

"The Worst" was a minor hit, making it to three different Billboard charts.

== Background ==
The song appeared on the Ride soundtrack. Fredro Starr, Sticky Fingaz and Sonny Seeza also starred in this movie "Ride", which was originally called "I-95". In February 1998, in an interview for MTV, Sticky Fingaz told about collaborating with Wu-Tang:

"...It was a collaboration. It's about the worst of the worst, meaning the best. We're the worst nightmare for everyone in hip-hop. When we recording this song in the studio all night, Meth said that he wouldn't leave the studio until this track will be done".

In February 1998, the song was also included in a Def Jam's promo release Shut 'Em Down (Exclusive Advance) under the name "Onyx vs. Wu-Tang".

== Music video ==
The music video was directed by Diane Martel and depicts a post-apocalyptic world where rap is banned. The video was filmed in Chinatown, Manhattan, New York City, including shooting in a restaurant Ipoh Garden Malaysian Chinese, and was released on "The BOX" on March 14, 1998.

The video can be found on the 2008's DVD Onyx: 15 Years Of Videos, History And Violence.

== Track listing ==
A-Side:

1. "The Worst" (radio edit) – 4:55
2. "The Worst" (instrumental) – 5:37

B-Side:

1. "The Worst" (album version) – 5:34
2. "The Worst" (instrumental) – 5:37

== Samples ==
- "Up Against the Wall" by Quincy Jones
- "Supercalifragilisticexpialidocious" by Julie Andrews and Dick Van Dyke
- "Protect Ya Neck" by Wu-Tang Clan
- "Step to the Rear" by Brand Nubian
- "Chitty Chitty Bang Bang" by Dick Van Dyke and Sally Ann Howes

== Personnel ==
- Onyx - performer, vocals
- Fredro Starr - performer, vocals
- Sticky Fingaz - performer, vocals
- Sonny Seeza - performer, vocals
- X1 - performer, vocals
- Method Man - performer, vocals
- Raekwon - performer, vocals
- Killa Sin - performer, vocals
- Latief - producer
- Don Elliott - engineer, mixing
- DJ LS One - additional mix engineer, scratches

== Charts ==
Chart	Position
US Hot R&B/Hip-Hop Singles & Tracks (Billboard)	64
US Hot Rap Singles (Billboard)	22
US Hot Dance Music/Maxi-Singles Sales (Billboard)	6
