= All City (rap group) =

American rap duo

- Greg Valentine (left) and J. Mega

Background information
- Origin: Brooklyn, New York City, U.S.
- Genres: Hip-hop, jazz-rap
- Years active: 1993–1998
- Labels: Armee Records, Geffen, MCA
- Members: J. Mega (Larry J. Troupe); Greg Valentine (Gregory P. Cordew)

All City was an American rap duo composed of Brooklyn-based rappers J. Mega and Greg Valentine. The duo was formed in 1993 and achieved wide popularity in 1998 with the release of the debut album, Metropolis Gold, on the MCA Records.

== History ==
All City was formed in Brooklyn in 1993. Both group members, rapper J. Mega and rapper/singer Greg Valentine performed as a solo artists at Lyricist Lounge on the Lower East Side of Manhattan, New York. After receiving a positive reaction from the fans, they decided to create their own group. The name of the duet comes from the graffiti-term "All City", this is how graffiti artists mark trains going through the whole New York.

Later they were discovered by then-popular hardcore rap group Onyx, who signed them to their new label, Armee Records, which was distributed by Mercury Records.

In 1995, All City released their debut single, "Who Dat"/"Metro Theme", through Armee Records. In the same year, the group took part in the recording of the second Onyx's album, All We Got Iz Us, in the songs "Purse Snatchaz" and "Getto Mentalitee". Three years later, the duo reappeared on the third Onyx's album, Shut 'Em Down, in the songs "Fuck Dat", "Overshine", and also on the track "Wilin' Wilin'" which was not included on the album.

In 1996, All City became the guest of Stretch & Bobbito, a popular radio show at the time. The program was broadcast on February 29, 1996. In 1997, Onyx helped get the duo a record deal with MCA Records, as a result of which their second single, "Move On You"/"Basic Training", was released on the Geffen Records. On June 9, 1998, MCA Records released their third single, "The Actual"/"Priceless", produced by DJ Premier and Pete Rock. On both tracks were shot videos, in which Onyx took part, as well as the producers of the songs themselves. DJ Premier-produced single "The Actual" peaked at number 3 on the Hot Rap Singles for 23 weeks, making the song the most hit song of the duo to date.

On September 15, 1998, MCA released another single, "The Hot Joint", with a remix of it on the B-side, on which the video was shot. The song peaked at 93 on the Hot Rap Singles. The label also released the single "Ded Right".

All City's debut album, entitled Metropolis Gold, was released on MCA Records on November 3, 1998. The album peaked at number 42 on the Top R&B/Hip Hop Albums and number 18 on the Top Heatseekers in the American magazine Billboard. However, the album was not commercially successful, not selling enough copies to reach the Billboard 200. After the release of the album, the duo disbanded without further releases. Greg Valentine continues to perform and record with other rap artists, but it's not known what J.Mega is doing today.

== Discography ==
=== Albums ===
List of albums, with selected chart positions
Title	Album details	Peak chart positions	
Title	Album details	US R&B	US Heat
Metropolis Gold	Released: November 3, 1998; Label: MCA; Format: CD, cassette, LP	42	18

=== Singles ===
- 1995: "Who Dat" / "Metro Theme"
- 1997: "Move On You" / "Basic Training"
- 1998: "The Actual" / "Priceless"
- 1998: "The Hot Joint"
- 1998: "Ded Right"

=== Videos ===
Abdul Malik Abbott shot all 3 videos:

- 1998: "The Actual"
- 1998: "Priceless"
- 1998: "The Hot Joint (Remix)"
