= Reality Has Got Me Tied Up =

Studio album by The Dove Shack
- Released: May 5, 2006
- Recorded: 2000
- Genre: West Coast hip hop; G-funk
- Label: Street Solid

The Dove Shack chronology
This Is the Shack (1995)	Reality Has Got Me Tied Up (2006)

Reality Has Got Me Tied Up is the second and final album by American G-funk group The Dove Shack. They released this follow up sophomore more than a decade after their debut. It featured guest appearances from Nate Dogg, Kam, Bad Azz, Goldie Loc, Baby Boy, Lil J, Madom Dree. The record did not hit any major music chart.

== Track listing ==
No.	Title	Length
1.	"Intro: Snoop Says"
2.	"Going Down" (featuring Kam)
3.	"Open Eyes" (featuring Baby Boy, Bad Azz, Lil' J)
4.	"We Funk G Funk"
5.	"We Bump"
6.	"Low Low"
7.	"Skit R.I.P."
8.	"What You See"
9.	"When We Ride"
10.	"Sorry We Keep Ya" (featuring Nate Dogg)
11.	"Gangsta" (featuring Madom Dree)
12.	"Ghetto Song"
13.	"Skit Train 2"
14.	"Fucc You Bitches" (featuring Goldie Loc)
15.	"What You See" (Remix)
16.	"We Bump" (Remix)

Sample credits

- Track 4 contains elements from "Funkin' for Jamaica (N.Y.)" by Tom Browne (1980) and "That's the Way (I Like It)" by KC & the Sunshine Band (1975)
- Track 5 contains elements from "Hold On" by En Vogue (1990) and "Eeny, meeny, miny, moe"
