= This Is the Shack =

Studio album by The Dove Shack
- Released: August 22, 1995
- Recorded: 1994–1995
- Studio: Cat-Artisan Studios (Hollywood, CA); Cherokee Recording Studios (Hollywood, CA); Paramount Recording Studios (Hollywood, CA); Track Record Inc. (North Hollywood, CA); Ultimate Sound Studios (Houston, TX)
- Genre: West Coast hip hop; G-funk
- Length: 1:00:38
- Label: G-Funk; Def Jam
- Producer: The Dove Shack; Clizark; Henry "Hank" Thomas and Lamon "Sleepy" Turner; Jam Master Jay; Crazy C; Warren G; Ghetto Klownz; Young Jedi; DJ Enuf

The Dove Shack chronology
| This Is the Shack (1995) | Reality Has Got Me Tied Up (2006) |

Singles from This Is the Shack
- 1. "Summertime in the LBC" Released: 1995; 2. "We Funk (the G Funk)" Released: 1995; 3. "Bomb Drop" Released: 1995

Professional ratings
Review scores
| Source | Rating |
|---|---|
| Allmusic | 3/5 stars |
| RapReviews | 7/10 stars |

This Is the Shack is the debut studio album by American G-funk trio The Dove Shack. It was released on August 22, 1995, by G-Funk Entertainment and Def Jam Recordings. The album peaked at #68 on the US Billboard 200 and #13 on the Top R&B/Hip-Hop Albums.

Its lead single, "Summertime in the LBC" featuring Arnita Porter, peaked at #54 on the Hot 100, #37 on the Hot R&B/Hip-Hop Songs, #11 on the Hot Rap Songs, #47 on the R&B/Hip-Hop Airplay, #39 on the Rhythmic, and was featured on the 1995 film The Show. Its second single, Young Jedi-produced "We Funk (The G Funk)", peaked at #44 on the Hot Rap Songs. The title track, "This Is the Shack", previously appeared on Warren G's debut album Regulate... G Funk Era, released a year prior to this album, albeit in a slightly different version.

== Track listing ==
| No. | Title | Producer(s) | Length |
|---|---|---|---|
| 1. | "Intro" (Skit) | DJ Enuf | 1:39 |
| 2. | "Smoke Out" (featuring Montell Jordan) | Keith Clizark | 4:32 |
| 3. | "This is the Shack" | Warren G | 5:50 |
| 4. | "Summertime in the LBC" (featuring Arnita Porter) | Lamon "Sleepy" Turner and Henry "Hank" Thomas | 3:58 |
| 5. | "Bomb Drop" | Jam Master Jay | 4:59 |
| 6. | "The Train" (Skit) | DJ Enuf | 2:00 |
| 7. | "Fuck Ya Mouth" | Keith Clizark | 4:15 |
| 8. | "Slap a Hoe" (Skit) | Ghetto Klownz | 1:53 |
| 9. | "Freestyle Interview" (Skit) | | 0:46 |
| 10. | "Freestyle" | Crazy C | 4:25 |
| 11. | "Crooked Cop" (Skit) | DJ Enuf | 1:13 |
| 12. | "Ghetto Life" | Crazy C | 4:47 |
| 13. | "East Side Party" | Jam Master Jay | 4:08 |
| 14. | "Rollin' Wit a Gang" | Keith Clizark | 4:09 |
| 15. | "We Funk (The G Funk)" | Young Jedi | 4:15 |
| 16. | "There'll Come a Day" | Lamon "Sleepy" Turner and Henry "Hank" Thomas | 3:53 |
| 17. | "Summertime in the LBC" (Rap) | Lamon "Sleepy" Turner and Henry "Hank" Thomas | 3:56 |
| Total length: | | | 1:00:38 |

Sample credits

- Track 3 contains elements from "Golden Lady" by Stevie Wonder (1973)
- Track 4 contains elements from "Feels So Good" by Midnight Star (1983)
- Track 5 contains elements from "You're Getting a Little Too Smart" by Detroit Emeralds (1973)
- Track 6 contains elements from "4 Play" by Y?N-Vee (1994)

== Personnel ==
- 2Scoop - vocals
- Bo-Roc - vocals
- C-Knight - vocals
- Arnita Porter - additional vocals (tracks: 4, 17)
- Tina Davis - additional vocals (track 9)
- Ricky Harris - producer (tracks: 1, 6, 11)
- Lamon "Sleepy" Turner and Henry "Hank" Thomas - Producer (tracks 4, 16, 17)
- Keith Clizark - producer (tracks: 2, 7, 14)
- Warren Griffin - producer (track 3)
- Jason Mizell - producer (tracks: 5, 13)
- Ghetto Klownz - producer (track 8)
- Simon Cullins - producer (tracks: 10, 12)
- Young Jedi - producer (track 15)
- Tony Dawsey - mastering
- Aaron Connor - mixing
- Greg Geitzenauer - mixing
- Tim Carter - photography
- Montell Jordan - uncredited vocals (track 2)
