= The Actual (song) =

Single by All City

from the album Metropolis Gold
- B-side: "Priceless"
- Released: June 9, 1998
- Genre: Hip hop
- Length: 4:12
- Label: MCA
- Songwriter(s): Larry Troupe; Gregory Cordew; Christopher Edward Martin
- Producer(s): DJ Premier

All City singles chronology
"The Actual" (1998)	"The Hot Joint" (1998)

Music video
- "The Actual" on YouTube

"The Actual" is a hip hop song written and performed by American rap duo All City. It was released on June 9, 1998 via MCA Records as the lead single from the group's only studio album Metropolis Gold. Production was handled by DJ Premier, who also shared co-writing credits.

The single peaked at number 75 on the Billboard Hot 100, number 48 on the Hot R&B/Hip-Hop Songs and number 3 on the Hot Rap Songs charts in the United States, becoming the duo's most successful song during their brief career. An accompanying music video was directed by Abdul Malik Abbott.

== Track listing ==
12" vinyl
No.	Title	Writer(s)	Producer(s)	Length
1.	"The Actual" (Clean)	Larry Troupe; Gregory Cordew; Chris E. Martin	DJ Premier
2.	"The Actual" (Dirty)	Troupe; Cordew; Martin	DJ Premier
3.	"The Actual" (Instrumental)	Troupe; Cordew; Martin	DJ Premier
4.	"Priceless" (Clean)	Troupe; Cordew; Pete Phillips; Christopher Wallace; Clifford Smith; Osten Harvey	Pete Rock
5.	"Priceless" (Dirty)	Troupe; Cordew; Phillips; Wallace; Smith; Harvey	Pete Rock
6.	"Priceless" (Instrumental)	Troupe; Cordew; Phillips; Wallace; Smith; Harvey	Pete Rock

== Personnel ==
- Larry "J. Mega" Troupe – songwriter, vocals
- Gregory "Greg Valentine" Cordew – songwriter, vocals
- Christopher "DJ Premier" Martin – songwriter, producer
- Onyx – executive producer
- Jeff Harris – management

== Charts ==
=== Weekly charts ===
Chart (1998)	Peak position
US Billboard Hot 100	75
US Hot R&B/Hip-Hop Songs (Billboard)	48
US Hot Rap Songs (Billboard)	3

=== Year-end charts ===
Chart (1998)	Position
US Hot Rap Songs (Billboard)	40
