= Metropolis Gold =

Studio album by All City
- Released: November 3, 1998
- Recorded: 1995–1998
- Genre: East Coast hip hop, underground hip hop
- Length: 71:35
- Label: MCA
- Producer: Rockwilder; Pete Rock; Latief King; Fredro Starr; DJ Clark Kent; DJ Premier; Ron "Amen-Ra" Lawrence; V. Black; EZ Elpee; Dave Atkinson

Professional ratings
Review scores
Source	Rating
AllMusic	2/5 stars
The Source	3/5 stars
The Standard	A−
XXL	L (3/5)

Metropolis Gold is the only studio album by American hip hop duo All City, released on November 3, 1998 by MCA Records. The album featured an all-star production lineup, including many prominent New York City producers such as DJ Premier, Pete Rock, Rockwilder, Fredro Starr, DJ Clark Kent, Hitmen member Ron "Amen-Ra" Lawrence, and EZ Elpee. It features guest appearances from rappers Native Souls and Onyx, which served as executive producers on the album.

Metropolis Gold peaked at #42 on the Top R&B/Hip Hop Albums and #18 on the Top Heatseekers. The album features two the Billboard singles: "The Actual" and "The Hot Joint". DJ Premier-produced single "The Actual" peaked at number 3 on the Hot Rap Singles for 23 weeks, making the song the most hit song of the duo to date.

The album was not commercially successful, not selling enough copies to reach the Billboard 200. After the release of it, the duo disbanded without further releases. Greg Valentine continues to perform and record with other rap artists, but it's not known what J.Mega is doing today.

== Track listing ==
#	Title	Featuring	Producer(s)	Length
1	"Who Dat"	Onyx	Latief King	1:16
2	"Stay Awake"		Rockwilder	4:30
3	"Priceless"	Onyx	Pete Rock	4:10
4	"Metrotheme"	Onyx	Latief King	4:11
5	"Xtreme"	Onyx	Fredro Starr	2:26
6	"The Hot Joint (Remix)"		DJ Clark Kent	5:20
7	"The Actual"		DJ Premier	4:11
8	"Live It Up"	Native Souls	Ron "Amen-Ra" Lawrence for The Hitmen	3:57
9	"Afta Hourz"		V. Black	3:34
10	"Ded Right"		EZ Elpee	5:07
11	"Get Paid"		Rockwilder	4:56
12	"Timez Iz Hard"		Latief King	4:21
13	"Daydreaming"		Dave Atkinson	5:19
14	"Favorite Things"		Fredro Starr	3:43
15	"The Hot Joint"		Ron "Amen-Ra" Lawrence for The Hitmen	4:48
16	"Move on You (Remix)"		Rockwilder	5:03
17	"Just Live"		Latief King	4:44

== Album singles ==
Single information
"Who Dat"
- Released: 1995
- Label: Armee Records
- B-Side: "Metrotheme"
"Move On You"
- Released: 1997
- Label: MCA Records
- B-Side: "Basic Training" (not on album)
"The Actual"
- Released: June 9, 1998
- Label: MCA Records
- B-Side: "Priceless"
"The Hot Joint (Remix)"
- Released: September 15, 1998
- Label: MCA Records
- B-Side: "The Hot Joint"
"Ded Right"
- Released: 1998
- Label: MCA Records
- B-Side: "Ded Right (Main)"

== Videos ==
Abdul Malik Abbott shot all 3 videos:

- 1998: "The Actual"
- 1998: "Priceless"
- 1998: "The Hot Joint (Remix)"

== Album chart positions ==
=== Weekly charts ===
Chart (1998)	Peak position
US Top R&B/Hip-Hop Albums (Billboard)	42
US Heatseekers Albums (Billboard)	18

== Singles chart positions ==
Year	Song	Chart positions		
Year	Song	Billboard Hot 100	Hot R&B/Hip-Hop Singles & Tracks	Hot Rap Singles
1998	"The Actual"	75	48	3
1998	"The Hot Joint"	-	93	49
