= Conversation (album) =

Studio album by Twinz
- Released: August 22, 1995
- Recorded: 1994–1995
- Genre: West Coast hip-hop; G-funk
- Label: Def Jam; G-Funk
- Producer: Warren G; Soopafly

Singles from Conversation
- 1. "Round & Round" Released: July 1995; 2. "Eastside LB" Released: January 30, 1996

Conversation is the only studio album by Long Beach hip-hop duo the Twinz. It was released on August 22, 1995, through Def Jam Recordings and G-Funk Entertainment and was produced by Warren G. Conversation peaked at No. 36 on the Billboard 200 and No. 8 on the Top R&B/Hip-Hop Albums chart. Two singles were released from the album, "Round & Round" and "Eastside LB". "First Round Draft Pick" first appeared on the soundtrack to the 1994 film, Jason's Lyric.

== Music videos ==
Four music videos were produced to promote the album: "4 Eyes 2 Heads", "Jump ta This", "Eastside LB" and "Round & Round". The group also performed "Round & Round" live on an episode of Nickelodeon's All That.

== Critical reception ==
Professional ratings
Review scores
Source	Rating
AllMusic	3/5 stars
Robert Christgau	(dud)
The Indianapolis Star	2.5/4 stars
NME	8/10
RapPages	3.5/5 stars
The Source	4/5 stars

The Indianapolis Star concluded that "the brothers' success depends on Warren G staying with them... For this all-too-comfy production, he could have picked anyone."

== Track listing ==
All tracks produced by Warren G except for track #4, which was produced by Soopafly

1. "Conversation # 1"
2. "Round & Round" (featuring Nanci Fletcher)
3. "Good Times" (featuring Nanci Fletcher)
4. "4 Eyes 2 Heads" (featuring Gorgeous Judah Ranks)
5. "Jump ta This"
6. "Eastside LB" (featuring Tracey Nelson and Warren G)
7. "Sorry I Kept You" (featuring Warren G)
8. "Conversation # 2"
9. "Journey Wit Me" (featuring Bo-Roc)
10. "Hollywood" (featuring Neb, Jah-Skillz and Nanci Fletcher)
11. "1st Round Draft Pick" (featuring Warren G)
12. "Conversation # 3"
13. "Don't Get It Twisted" (featuring New Birth)
14. "Pass It On" (featuring Foesum and Warren G)

== Samples ==
Eastside LB

- "Free" by Deniece Williams
- "Hot Sex" by A Tribe Called Quest

Good Times

- "You Are My Everything" by Surface

Hollywood

- "Hollywood" by Rufus and Chaka Khan

Pass It On

- "People Make the World Go Round" by the Stylistics
