= Ride (soundtrack) =

Ride (Music from the Dimension Motion Picture)

Soundtrack album by various artists
- Released: January 27, 1998
- Recorded: 1997
- Genres: Hip hop; R&B
- Length: 1:11:31
- Label: Tommy Boy
- Producers: Bill Stephney (exec.); Byron Phillips (exec.); Frank Cooper III (exec.); Al West; Ali Shaheed Muhammad; Battlecat; Chad Eliott; Craig B; DJ U-Neek; Latief; Lord Digga; M.A.S.; Moocho; Naughty by Nature; Poke; Raphael Saadiq; Rome; Somethin' for the People; Teddy Blend; The Roots; William "Skylz" Stewart

Singles from Ride
- 1. "Mourn You Til I Join You" Released: October 28, 1997; 2. "The Worst" Released: January 6, 1998; 3. "The Weekend" Released: January 31, 1998; 4. "Jam on It" Released: April 18, 1998; 5. "Callin'" Released: June 6, 1998

Professional ratings
Review scores
Source	Rating
AllMusic	3/5 stars

Ride (Music from the Dimension Motion Picture) is the soundtrack to Millicent Shelton's 1998 film Ride. It was released on January 27, 1998 (exactly 2 months before the film's release on March 27, 1998), by Tommy Boy Records and consists of hip hop and R&B music. The album has performances by Adriana Evans, Big Mike, Dave Hollister, Eric Benét, Erick Sermon, Mack 10, Mia X, Naughty by Nature, N.O.R.E., Onyx, Raphael Saadiq, Redman, Somethin' for the People, Tha Eastsidaz, The Roots and Wu-Tang Clan, among others.

The album reached number 54 on the Billboard 200 and number 13 on the Top R&B/Hip-Hop Albums chart in the United States. Five singles were released from it: "Mourn You Til I Join You", "The Worst", "Callin'", "Jam on It" and "The Weekend".

== Track listing ==
No.	Title	Producer(s)	Length
1.	"The Weekend" (Dave Hollister featuring Redman and Erick Sermon)	Teddy Blend; William "Skylz" Stewart	3:56
2.	"The Worst" (Wu-Tang Clan and Onyx)	Latief	5:35
3.	"Blood Money (Part 2)" (Noreaga featuring Nas and Nature)	Poke	4:51
4.	"Outta Sight" (Rufus Blaq)	Al West; Chad Elliott	3:43
5.	"Soldier Funk" (Mia X featuring Fiend and Mac)	Craig B	3:33
6.	"The Game" (Mack 10, Big Mike, DJ U-Neek featuring Earth, Wind & Fire)	DJ U-Neek	4:45
7.	"The Symptoms" (Black Caesar)	M.A.S.	4:32
8.	"Feels So Good" (Eastsiders featuring Snoop Doggy Dogg)	Battlecat	4:36
9.	"Mourn You Til I Join You" (Naughty by Nature)	Naughty by Nature	5:17
10.	"Jam on It" (Cardan featuring Jermaine Dupri)	Lord Digga	4:11
11.	"Higher" (Sexions)	Moocho	3:49
12.	"Callin'" (Amari)	Rome	3:47
13.	"Why" (Eric Benét and The Roots)	The Roots	4:43
14.	"No One" (Somethin' for the People featuring Trina & Tamara)	Somethin' for the People	5:13
15.	"Can't Get Enough" (Raphael Saadiq featuring Willie Max)	Raphael Saadiq; Lathun Grady (co.)	4:36
16.	"Never Say Goodbye" (Adriana Evans featuring Phife Dawg)	Ali Shaheed Muhammad	4:24
Total length:			1:11:31

== Charts ==
Chart (1998)	Peak position
US Billboard 200	54
US Top R&B/Hip-Hop Albums (Billboard)	13
