= Twinz =

American hip hop group

- Also known as: Tha Loccs
- Origin: Long Beach, California, U.S.
- Genres: West Coast hip hop; G-funk
- Years active: 1994–present
- Labels: Doggystyle; Def Jam; G-Funk
- Members: Trip Locc; Wayniac

The Twinz are a hip hop duo from Long Beach, California, consisting of twin brothers Deon and Dewayne Williams. After working with Warren G on his debut album Regulate...G Funk Era, the Twinz released their only album Conversation in 1995. That same year, the Twinz performed their hit single, "Round & Round," on an episode of Nickelodeon's All That as well as the syndicated dance music show Soul Train.

In 1997 the duo appeared on Warren G's second album Take a Look Over Your Shoulder on the track "We Brings Heat". On Tha Eastsidaz 2000 debut album, Tha Eastsidaz, the Twinz were featured on the track "Dogghouse". In 2009 with the help of Snoop Dogg, Twinz released an EP titled Tha Loccs, which has five tracks. Four of them includes the rapper Lil' ½ Dead and three tracks include Snoop Dogg.

== Discography ==
=== Studio albums ===
Title	Release	Peak chart positions		
Title	Release	US	US R&B	US Rap
Conversation	Released: August 22, 1995; Label: G-Funk, Def Jam; Format: CD, LP, cassette	36	8	—

=== Extended plays ===
- Tha Loccs (2009)

=== Singles ===
Title	Release	Peak chart positions			Album
Title	Release	US	US R&B	US Rap	Album
"Round & Round"	1995	84	60	20	Conversation
"Eastside LB"	1996	–	58	24	Conversation

=== Soundtrack appearances ===
Title	Release	Other artist(s)	Soundtrack
"First Round Draft Pick"	1994	Warren G	Jason's Lyric
"Still Can't Fade It"	1995	Warren G, Bo-Roc	The Show

=== Guest appearances ===
Title	Release	Other artist(s)	Album
"Recognize"	1994	Warren G	Regulate... G Funk Era
"So Many Ways"	1994	Warren G, Lady Levi	Regulate... G Funk Era
"Runnin' wit No Breaks"	1994	Warren G, Jah Skills, Bo-Roc, G Child	Regulate... G Funk Era
"The Ultimate Collaboration"	1996	Foesum	Perfection
"We Brings Heat"	1997	Warren G, Da Five Footaz	Take a Look Over Your Shoulder
"All Aboard"	1998	Tray Dee	C-Style Presents Straight Outta Cali
"Dogghouse"	2000	Tha Eastsidaz, Rappin' 4-Tay	Tha Eastsidaz
"Players Play"	2003	Da 5 Footaz	The Lost Scrolls
"All In the Family"	2005	E-White, Foesum, Rick D, Cigar Lee	48 Hours: The White Album

== Videography ==
=== Music videos ===
Title	Release	Other artist(s)	Album
"Jump ta This"	1995		Conversation
"Round & Round"	1995	Nanci Fletcher	Conversation
"4 Eyes 2 Heads"	1995	Gorgeous Judah Ranks	Conversation
"Eastside LB"	1996	Tracey Nelson, Warren G	Conversation
"Dogghouse"	2000	Tha Eastsidaz, Rappin' 4-Tay	Tha Eastsidaz
