= The Show (soundtrack) =

The Show: The Soundtrack

Soundtrack album by various artists
- Released: August 15, 1995
- Recorded: 1994–1995
- Genre: Gangsta rap; g-funk; hardcore hip-hop; R&B
- Length: 1:15:36
- Label: Def Jam; PolyGram
- Producer: Drew Dixon (exec.); Russell Simmons (exec.); Andrew Massop; Dave Swang; Deric "D-Dot" Angelettie; Desmond "Divine" Houston; Domino; DJ U-Neek; Easy Mo Bee; Erick Sermon; Fredro Starr; Henry "Hank" Thomas; Isaac 2 Isaac; Ajb • Jam Master Jay; Joseph Simmons; Lamon "Sleepy" Turner; LL Cool J; Marc Pomeroy; Nashiem Myrick; Prodeje; Q-Tip; Ron "Amen-Ra" Lawrence; Sean "Puffy" Combs; Sonee Seeza; Sticky Fingaz; Tony "T-Funk" Pearyer • Gmoney; Ty Fyffe; Warren G; Robert "Fonksta" Bacon (co.); Tomie Mundy (co.)

Singles from The Show: The Soundtrack
- 1. "Live!!!" Released: July 18, 1995; 2. "How High" Released: August 15, 1995

Professional ratings
Review scores
| Source | Rating |
|---|---|
| AllMusic | 4.5/5 stars |

The Show: The Soundtrack is the soundtrack to Brian Robbins' 1995 film The Show. It was released on August 15, 1995, through Def Jam Recordings, and consists of hip hop music.

== Commercial performance ==
The soundtrack album was certified gold and platinum on October 16, 1995. And sold 136,500 in its 1st week.

== Track listing ==
| No. | Title | Producer(s) | Length |
|---|---|---|---|
| 1. | "Hip Hop Is..." (performed by Kid Creole, Kid Capri & Ecstasy) | | 0:10 |
| 2. | "Live!!!" (performed by Onyx) | Fredro Starr; Sticky Fingaz; Sonee Seeza | 3:30 |
| 3. | "Move On..." (performed by Slick Rick) | | 0:14 |
| 4. | "My Block" (performed by 2Pac) | Easy Mo Bee | 5:11 |
| 5. | "What's Up Star?" (performed by Suga) | Deric "D-Dot" Angelettie; Ron "Amen-Ra" Lawrence | 4:10 |
| 6. | "Headbanger Boogie" (performed by Method Man) | | 0:16 |
| 7. | "How High" (performed by Method Man & Redman) | Erick Sermon | 4:41 |
| 8. | "It's Entertainment..." (performed by Dr. Dre) | | 0:20 |
| 9. | "Everyday Thang" (performed by Bone Thugs-n-Harmony) | DJ U-Neek | 3:56 |
| 10. | "Everyday It Rains" (performed by Mary J. Blige) | Sean "Puffy" Combs; Nashiem Myrick | 4:03 |
| 11. | "It's All I Had" (performed by The Notorious B.I.G.) | | 0:11 |
| 12. | "Ol' Skool" (performed by Isaac 2 Isaac) | Desmond "Divine" Houston; Isaac 2 Isaac; Joseph Simmons | 3:39 |
| 13. | "Domino's In the House" (performed by Domino) | Domino | 4:05 |
| 14. | "Summertime in the LBC" (performed by The Dove Shack & Arnita Porter) | Henry "Hank" Thomas; Lamon "Sleepy" Turner | 3:55 |
| 15. | "The West Coast..." (performed by Treach) | | 0:22 |
| 16. | "Sowhatusayin" (performed by South Central Cartel, Jayo Felony, MC Eiht, Sh'killa, Spice 1 & Treach) | Prodeje; Robert "Fonksta" Bacon (co.); Tomie Mundy (co.) | 6:49 |
| 17. | "Zoom Zooms and Wam Wam" (performed by Jayo Felony) | Jam Master Jay; Tony "T-Funk" Pearyer | 4:01 |
| 18. | "Droppin' Bombz" (performed by Tray D & So. Sentrelle) | Dave Swang | 4:17 |
| 19. | "Save Yourself" (performed by Snoop Doggy Dogg) | | 0:24 |
| 20. | "Still Can't Fade It" (performed by Warren G, Twinz & Bo Roc) | Warren G | 3:35 |
| 21. | "Papa Luv It" (performed by LL Cool J) | LL Cool J; Ty Fyffe | 4:56 |
| 22. | "Glamour and Glitz" (performed by A Tribe Called Quest) | Q-Tip | 3:37 |
| 23. | "Nuttin' but a Drumbeat..." (performed by Russell Simmons) | | 0:18 |
| 24. | "Kill Dem All" (performed by Kali Ranks) | Andrew Massop; Marc Pomeroy; Gmoney Ajb | 4:47 |
| 25. | "Me & My Bitch (Live from Philly)" (performed by The Notorious B.I.G. & Puff Daddy) | | 2:58 |
| 26. | "It's What I Feel Inside..." (performed by Kid Creole & Ecstasy) | | 0:25 |
| 27. | "The Show Theme" (performed by Stanley Clarke & Slick Rick) | | 0:46 |
| Total length: | | | 1:15:36 |

== Charts ==
=== Weekly charts ===
| Chart (1995) | Peak position |
|---|---|
| US Billboard 200 | 4 |
| US Top R&B/Hip-Hop Albums (Billboard) | 1 |

=== Year-end charts ===
| Chart (1995) | Position |
|---|---|
| US Billboard 200 | 84 |
| US Top R&B/Hip-Hop Albums (Billboard) | 13 |

== Certifications ==
| Region | Certification | Certified units/sales |
|---|---|---|
| United States (RIAA) | Platinum | 1,000,000^{^} |
^{^} Shipments figures based on certification alone.

== See also ==
- List of number-one R&B albums of 1995 (U.S.)
