= Round & Round (Twinz song) =

Single by Twinz

from the album Conversation
- B-side: "4 Eyes 2 Heads"
- Released: July 1995
- Recorded: 1995
- Genre: G-funk
- Length: 3:42
- Label: Def Jam
- Songwriter(s): Deon Williams; Dewayne Williams
- Producer(s): Warren G

Twinz singles chronology
"Round & Round" (1995)	"Eastside LB" (1996)

"Round & Round" is the lead single released by the Twinz from their debut album, Conversation. Produced by Warren G, "Round & Round" became the most successful single the Twinz would release during their brief existence, making to four different Billboard charts, including 84 on the Billboard Hot 100. R&B singer Nanci Fletcher is featured on the song.

== Single track listing ==
1. "Round & Round" (Radio Edit)- 3:42
2. "Round & Round" (LP Version)- 3:42
3. "Round & Round" (Instrumental)- 3:42
4. "4 Eyes 2 Heads" (LP Version)- 3:20

== Charts ==
Chart	Position
Billboard Hot 100	# 84
U.S. Hot R&B Singles	# 60
Hot Rap Singles	# 20
Hot Dance Music/Maxi-Singles Sales	# 47
