= Foesum =

American hip hop group

- Also known as: Perfection
- Origin: Long Beach, California, U.S.
- Genres: West Coast hip hop; Gangsta rap; G-funk
- Years active: 1986–present
- Labels: The Perfection Label; Tommy Boy; Penalty; Big Beat
- Members: MNMsta; DJ Glaze; T-Dubb (deceased)
- Past members: Wayniac; The Twinz; Domino; Travvy Trav (deceased)

Foesum is an American hip hop group whose members included T-Dubb, MNMsta and DJ Glaze. They recorded an album on Penalty Records/Tommy Boy called Perfection, released on October 22, 1996.

== History ==
In 1986, DJ Glaze and MNMsta created a DJ crew called Perfection and recruited members from their neighborhood and local high school in Long Beach, California. During the next three years Perfection performed at a number of school dances and parties in town. By 1989, Perfection had recruited over 10 members. Towards the end of their senior year, they came up with an idea to produce their own record. Travvy Trav, one of the older members of the group, searched for one of the "dopest" MC's in Long Beach and found Domino, who at the time attended Millikan High School. Perfection recruited Domino and purchased a Roland 808 drum machine to start making demos in the garage with the intention of securing a record deal. Dozens of songs were recorded and members Tender D and Mellow D (now known as The Twinz) were brought into the group by T-Dubb and Travvy Trav, who are also first cousins of The Twinz. After many disappointments and personality conflicts, Domino left the group for Perfection to fend for themselves. This sparked a collaboration with fellow Long Beach Eastsider Snoop Doggy Dogg called "Let 'Em Understand Perfection" on a compilation album called Please Pass The Mic which was a "diss" track aimed at Domino. This explains one of the lines by Snoop in Dr. Dre's "Nuthin' but a 'G' Thang" song, "Perfection is perfected, so I let 'em understand".

In 1991, Perfection met "Big Wes" Crockett and Suge Knight who were then bodyguards for New Edition. Big Wes was starting his own label, Lockdown Records, and took an interest in the group. After a few months, the name Perfection was dropped and Foesum was born. Foesum (slang for "foursome") had more street appeal and consisted of four members: T-Dubb, Wayniac, MNM and DJ Glaze. Foesum recorded an entire unreleased album at Solar Records, home of legendary groups like Lakeside, the Whispers and Babyface. Songs that were recorded included "Ridin' High" (re-recorded on the Twinz album), "Point of No Return", "Knick Knack Patty Wack" ,"Ain't No Fun" (featuring Kid Frost), "Much Love" and MNM's "Chrome To The Dome". With little possibility of a record deal, Foesum was inactive for about a year, but, in 1992, Wayniac was approached by Warren G who needed help writing his album Regulate...G Funk Era. Eventually, Wayniac teamed up with his brother Trip Locc as The Twinz, signing a record deal on Def Jam Records. In the meantime, Glaze, MNMsta and T-Dubb continued to record. They decided to keep the name and to make Travvy Trav (who died from a heart problem during the struggle) as the silent fourth member.

In 1994, Foesum met Tony G and Julio G of the original 1580 AM KDAY Mixmasters through Kid Frost. Ruthless Records' CEO, Eazy-E, asked Julio G to co-host The Ruthless Radio Show on 92.3 The Beat in Los Angeles. In just a few weeks and with Tony G's help, Foesum recorded "Lil Somethin' Somethin'" and "Listen To The Sound". It caught the ear of Eazy E and the hip hop entrepreneur Kevin Mitchell in New York who was able to make deals with Big Beat/Atlantic Records and Tommy Boy Records. Foesum eventually signed a deal with Atlantic Records in January 1995. The first single, "Lil Somethin' Somethin'" was released in summer 1995 on Big Beat/Atlantic Records and received major play on the video show The Box and radio stations. The album, Perfection, was released on Penalty Records/Tommy Boy in the Fall of 1996. Since then, Foesum has worked on new albums to release on their own independent venture called The Perfection Label including The FoeFathers, a greatest hits album, and solo projects.

== Discography ==
Studio albums

- Perfection (1996)
- The Foefathers (2002)
- The Lost Tapez (2004)
- U Heard of Us (2005)
- The G-Mixes (2006)
- Loyalty and Respect (2010)
- Futuristic G'z (2012)
- G Funk Shun (2014)
- Cali Life (2014)
- What Legends Are Made Of (2016)
- International Collaborations (2024)
- Two Thousand Twenty Foesum (2025)

Compilation albums

- The Greatest Hits Volume One (2004)
- The Greatest Hits Volume Two (2011)
- The Greatest Hits Volume Three (2016)

Solo albums

- DJ Glaze – Ultimate Collaborations (2002)
- MNMsta – Walk In My Shoez (2004)
- MNMsta – Here For A Reason (2007)
- MNMsta – Unbreakable (2011)

=== Guest appearances ===
- MNMsta (Foesum) & Butch Cassidy - Hard 2 Find prod. Ill Slim Collin (2026)

Title	Year	Artist(s)	Album
"Pass It On"	1995	Twinz (feat. Foesum and Warren G)	Conversation
