= Eastside LB =

Single by Twinz featuring Warren G and Tracey Nelson

from the album Conversation
- B-side: "Jump ta This"
- Released: January 30, 1996
- Recorded: 1995
- Genre: G-funk - Hip hop - R&B
- Length: 3:38
- Label: Def Jam
- Songwriters: Deon Williams; Dewayne Williams
- Producer: Warren G

Twinz singles chronology
"Round & Round" (1995)	"Eastside LB" (1996)

"Eastside LB" is the second single released by the Twinz from their debut album, Conversation. Warren G, who produced the song, was featured on "Eastside LB" along with R&B singer Tracey Nelson. The song was a minor hit on the R&B and rap charts.

== Single track listing ==
1. "Eastside LB" (LP Version)- 3:38
2. "Eastside LB" (Instrumental)- 3:38
3. "Jump ta This" (LP Version)- 2:53

== Charts ==
Chart	Position
U.S. R&B / Hip-Hop	# 58
Hot Rap Singles	# 24
