= The Show (1995 film) =

1995 US documentary film by Brian Robbins

- Home video poster
- Directed by: Brian Robbins
- Produced by: Brian Robbins; Michael Tollin
- Starring: Russell Simmons
- Cinematography: Dasal Banks; Larry Banks; Stephen Consentino; Ericson Core; John L. Demps Jr. Michael Negrin; John Simmons
- Edited by: Michael Schultz
- Music by: Stanley Clarke
- Production company: Rysher Entertainment
- Distributed by: Savoy Pictures
- Release date: August 25, 1995
- Running time: 93 minutes
- Country: United States
- Language: English
- Box office: $2,702,578

The Show is a 1995 American documentary film about hip hop music. It was directed by Brian Robbins (in his feature directorial debut) and featured interviews with some of hip hop's biggest names. Def Jam founder Russell Simmons stars in and narrates the film. The film grossed $1,482,892 in its opening weekend and $2,702,578 during its theatrical run.

== Cast ==
- Afrika Bambaataa
- The Notorious B.I.G.
- Kurtis Blow
- Sean "Puffy" Combs
- Snoop Doggy Dogg
- Dr. Dre
- Warren G
- Andre Harrell of Uptown Records
- Kid Capri
- LL Cool J
- Craig Mack
- Method Man
- Melle Mel
- Naughty by Nature
- Raekwon
- Run-D.M.C.
- Slick Rick
- Russell Simmons
- Tha Dogg Pound
- Twinz
- Whodini
- Wu-Tang Clan

== Soundtracks ==
A soundtrack consisting entirely of hip hop was released on August 15, 1995 by Def Jam Recordings. The soundtrack was very successful, peaking at 4 on the Billboard 200 and 1 on the Top R&B/Hip-Hop Albums and was certified platinum on October 16, 1995.
