= The Dove Shack =

American hip hop group

Background information
- Origin: Long Beach, California, U.S.
- Genres: G-funk, West Coast hip hop
- Years active: 1994–2006, 2017, 2018
- Label: G-Funk/Def Jam
- Past members: Bo-Roc; 2Scoops; C-Knight

The Dove Shack was an American G-funk group from Long Beach, California. Consisting of C-Knight, Bo-Roc and 2Scoops, the group made their debut with the song "This Is the Shack" on Warren G's album Regulate...G Funk Era. Under the same name they released their first album in 1995 with the substantial hit single "Summertime in the LBC" featuring Arnita Porter. They later contributed to a few compilations, and released Reality Has Got Me Tied Up in 2006.

C-Knight died from a stroke on November 7, 2023, at the age of 52.

== Discography ==
=== Studio albums ===
Title	Release	Peak chart positions	
Title	Release	US	US R&B
This Is the Shack	1995	68	13
Reality Has Got Me Tied Up	2006	—	—

=== Solo projects ===
- C-Knight – Knight Time (2001)
- 2Scoop – It's About Time (2010)
- Bo Roc – My Music, My Soul (2010)
- Bo Roc – Loves for Free EP with Sabotawj (2011)
- Bo Roc – Loves for Free II EP with Mr. Milky (2015)

=== Singles ===
Title	Release	Peak chart positions			Album
Title	Release	US	US R&B	US Rap	Album
"Summertime in the LBC"	1995	54	37	11	This Is the Shack
"We Funk (The G Funk)"	1995	—	—	44	This Is the Shack
"Bomb Drop"	1995	—	—	—	This Is the Shack
"Smoke Out"	—	—	—		

==== Guest appearances ====
Title	Release	Other artist(s)	Album
"This is the Shack"	1994	Warren G	Regulate... G Funk Era

==== Soundtrack appearances ====
Title	Release	Other artist(s)	Soundtrack album
"Summertime in the LBC"	1995	Arnita Porter	The Show

== Videography ==
=== Music videos ===
Title	Release	Album
"Summertime in the LBC"	1995	This Is the Shack
"We Funk (The G Funk)"	1995	This Is the Shack
"Bomb Drop"	1995	This Is the Shack
