= The Box (American TV channel) =

American television network

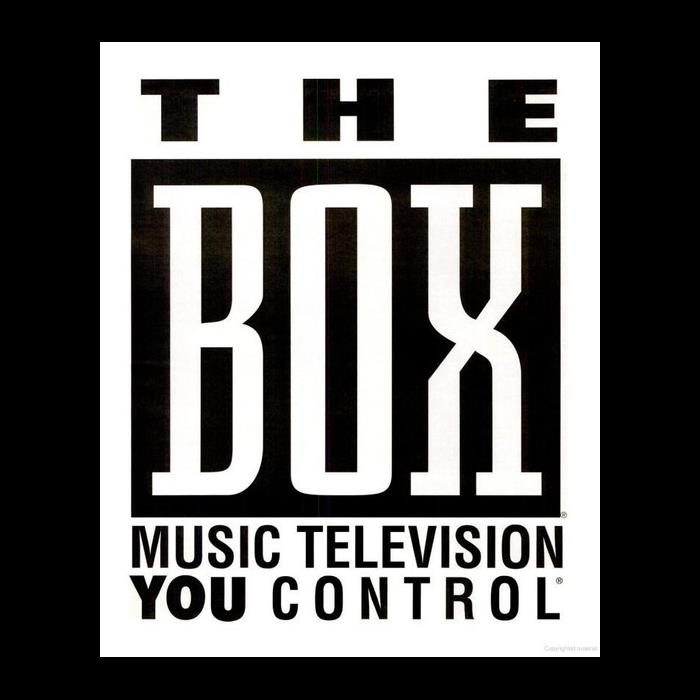
- Country: United States
- Broadcast area: Nationwide

Programming
- Language(s): English
- Picture format: 480i (SDTV)

Ownership
- Owner: Steve Peters (1985–1999); MTV Networks (Viacom) (1999–2000)
- Sister channels: MTV (1999–2000)

History
- Launched: 1985; 40 years ago
- Closed: December 31, 2000; 24 years ago
- Replaced by: MTV2
- Former names: Video Jukebox Network (1985–1992)

Links
- Website: mtv.com/mtv2 (2001–present, as MTV2; USA) boxplus.com (Channel 4-owned UK operations)

The Box, originally named the Video Jukebox Network, was an American television channel that operated from 1985 to 2001.

The network was distributed on cable and satellite providers, with additional carriage on over-the-air UHF television stations (mainly on low-power outlets).

== History ==
The network originally launched as the Video Jukebox Network in 1985; it was founded by Steve Peters, who launched it on a television station in Miami, Florida. It was initially a product of the Miami Music scene, and was hosted by a group of local Miami Bass rappers known as Miami Boyz. Peters formed a record company called Peter's Records from the revenue earned by the Video Jukebox Network. Despite having his foot in the local Miami Bass scene, and employing hip-hop producers from abroad, none of its artists managed to produce a hit record; the label was shut down before Peters sold The Box to a group which included cable operator TCI and Island Records founder Chris Blackwell.

In 1990, Les Garland—co-founder of rival Viacom-owned music networks MTV and VH1—was brought in to run the network. From 1990 to 1997, Garland, as Executive Vice President, played an essential role in the domestic and international launch of the interactive music channel. He was responsible for entertainment programming, promotion, ad sales and marketing, and he oversaw the rollout of the channel from a base of 200,000 homes at its inception to more than 30 million U.S. households and 25 million households internationally.

== Technology ==
Headends incorporated a video server which allowed for localized content mixes – local demographics could be taken into account for selecting the list of videos available for request or frequently requested genres/bands could be queued automatically. The video server had up to a 64GB HDD and the video programs were compressed in the MPEG2 format. In 2000, The Box had approximately 1,800 music videos in its inventory, 150 to 300 of which were queued across the network, at any given time. Subscribers could call the Interactive Voice Response at The Box's central office to request videos over the phone, which was typical, but could also request over the internet or via set-top box. The central office would then send the data to the individual headends regarding what was ordered.

== International services ==
=== United Kingdom ===
An indirectly related offshoot service licensing the Box branding and format commenced broadcasts in the United Kingdom on 25 April 1992, under founding owner Video Jukebox Network International Ltd. Coinciding with the consolidation of the American version with MTV2, MTV parent Viacom sold the British channel to Box Television Ltd UK (EMAP) in October 2000. The UK Box service, which was primarily distributed via satellite and streaming platforms, ceased operations on 30 June 2024, as part of a broader closure of several underperforming channels—a number of which were music channels based on Bauer Radio station brands—owned by London-based Channel Four Television Corporation (which acquired German media conglomerate Bauer Media Group's interest in sister channel The Box Plus Network in 2019).

== See also ==
- MTV2
