= Abdullah H. Abdur-Razzaq =

American activist (1931–2014)

- Born: James Monroe King Warden; December 20, 1931; Brooklyn, New York, U.S.
- Died: November 21, 2014 (aged 82); Bellevue Hospital Center, Kips Bay, Manhattan, New York, U.S.
- Other names: James 67X, James Shabazz
- Education: Lincoln University; Columbia University
- Occupation: Author

Abdullah H. Abdur-Razzaq (December 20, 1931 – November 21, 2014) was an African-American activist and Muslim known for being one of Malcolm X's most trusted associates.

Born James Monroe King Warden, he was known as James 67X among fellow members of the Nation of Islam and, later, as James Shabazz, following his split from the organization.

== Early life ==
Abdullah Abdur-Razzaq was born James Monroe King Warden in Brooklyn, New York, and raised in the Morningside Heights neighborhood of Manhattan. He attended the Bronx High School of Science, from which he graduated with honors. He enrolled in the City College of New York but transferred to Lincoln University in Chester County, Pennsylvania, after a year. He soon left that school as well to join the Army. Following his discharge, he returned to Lincoln and graduated with honors in English in 1958. He received a master's degree from Columbia University.

== His work ==
In 1958, Abdur-Razzaq joined the Nation of Islam at Mosque No. 7, on 102 West 116th Street in New York City. As was the custom among Nation of Islam members, he abandoned his surname (still Warden at the time) as a vestige of chattel slavery and became the 67th James in Mosque No. 7.

By 1960, Abdullah had been promoted to lieutenant in the Fruit of Islam. Subsequently, he was appointed circulation manager for New York, New Jersey, and Connecticut of Muhammad Speaks, answerable directly to Malcolm X.

Abdullah would split from the Nation of Islam soon after Malcolm X and join Malcolm in forming Muslim Mosque, Inc. Still known as James 67X, he was appointed the organization's secretary and captain of men. He took the name James Shabazz.

Brother James, as he was sometimes referred, was also responsible for the formation of the Organization of Afro-American Unity, a secular organization that Malcolm X had also conceived, patterned after Addis Ababa, Ethiopia's Organisation of African Unity, through which Malcolm X intended to charge the United States with violating the human rights of its chattel slave descendants.

Abdullah was a constant and willing aide to Malcolm X, in his capacity as head of Muslim Mosque, Inc. and as head of the Organization of Afro-American Unity. He remained with, and actively assisted Malcolm X, until the leader's assassination on February 21, 1965.

=== Post-Malcolm X days ===
Abdullah spent the years following Malcolm X's murder raising a family and co-founding Al-Karim School (which would later become Brooklyn's famed Cush Campus Schools) with his wife, Ora Abdur-Razzaq. He later moved to Guyana, where he worked as a farmer. Returning to the U.S. in 1988, he earned a nursing degree, and he worked as a nurse until his retirement in 2004.

In his later years, Abdur-Razzaq's work as staff consultant for the Schomburg Center for Research in Black Culture was crucial for cataloging rare photographs, letters and accounts of Malcolm X's life and times. Furthermore, his expertise was widely solicited by journalists, authors, film makers and educators. In addition to his contributions to a wide array of published works, such as Bruce Perry's Malcolm X: The Last Speeches, Abdur-Razzaq was featured in several television interviews and films, including Malcolm X: Make It Plain and Gil Noble's Like It Is. The DVD version of Jack Baxter's documentary Brother Minister: The Assassination of Malcolm X includes an "Exclusive Interview with Abdullah Abdur-Razzaq, Malcolm X's closest associate".

== Final years and death ==
In April 2013, Abdur-Razzaq returned to Lincoln University to speak about his memories and experiences working with Malcolm X.

Abdullah died of leukemia on November 21, 2014, at the age of 82, at Bellevue Hospital Center, Kips Bay, Manhattan. He was survived by 11 children. His wife Yvonne Warden preceded him in death.
