= Muslim Mosque, Inc. =

Human rights group focused on improving the lives of Afro-Americans

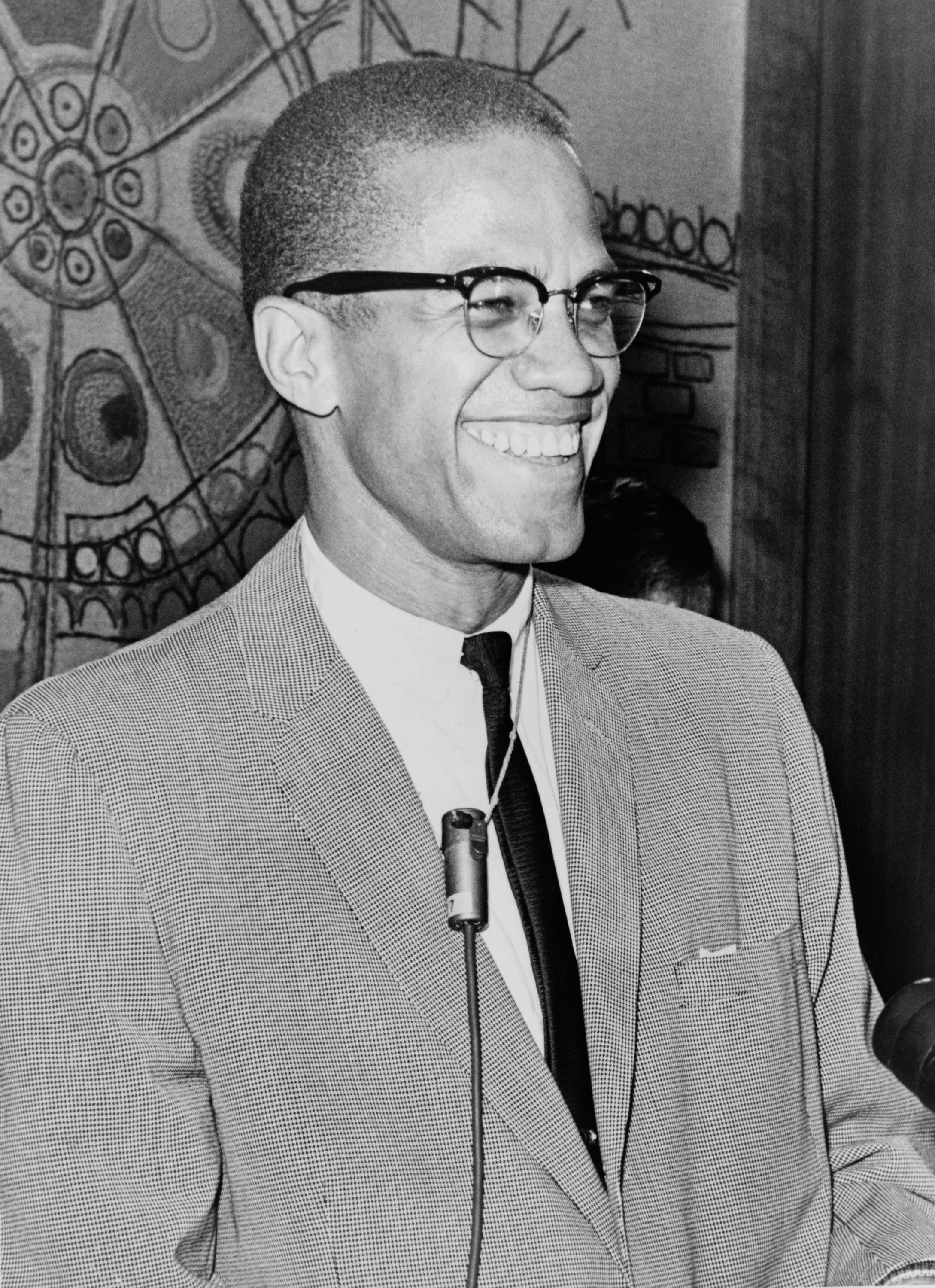
Malcolm X, March 12, 1964

Muslim Mosque, Inc. (MMI) was an Islamic organization formed by Malcolm X after he left the Nation of Islam. MMI was a relatively small group that collapsed after its founder was assassinated.

== History ==
Malcolm X announced the establishment of Muslim Mosque, Inc. on March 12, 1964, four days after his departure from the Nation of Islam. The group's membership consisted primarily of former Nation of Islam members. In a 2003 interview, one of its former leaders recalled that MMI started with a core of about 50 dedicated activists.

Malcolm X spent much of the time between March 1964 and February 1965 overseas. In his absence, James 67X Shabazz served as the de facto leader of Muslim Mosque, Inc.

Between March 1964, when he left the Nation of Islam, and February 1965, when he was assassinated, Malcolm X's philosophy evolved as he traveled through Africa and the Middle East. Those changes confused many members of Muslim Mosque, Inc.

Initially, the teachings of Muslim Mosque, Inc. were similar to those of the Nation of Islam. When Malcolm X became a Sunni Muslim, made the hajj, and wrote to the members of MMI from Mecca about his pilgrimage and how it had forced him to reject the racism that had previously characterized his views of white people, many members could not believe what they were hearing. The Nation of Islam had taught that no white people were permitted in the holy city of Mecca. Some MMI members refused to believe that Malcolm X had become a Sunni, and others thought he was being misquoted when he wrote about white people.

By May 1964, membership in Muslim Mosque, Inc. had grown to 125, and the group was attracting people who were not former Nation of Islam members.

Malcolm X sought acceptance of Muslim Mosque, Inc. by mainstream Islamic organizations. In August 1964, the Supreme Council on Islamic Affairs awarded 20 scholarships to permit young MMI members to study at Al-Azhar University tuition-free. Also in August, MMI was admitted to the Islamic Federation of the United States and Canada. The following month the World Islamic League offered 15 scholarships through MMI for study at the Islamic University of Madinah.

Following the assassination of Malcolm X in February 1965, Muslim Mosque, Inc. foundered and was disbanded.

The Mosque of Islamic Brotherhood, located at 130 West 113th Street in Harlem, is a successor to Muslim Mosque, Inc.

== See also ==
- Organization of Afro-American Unity
- Bibliography of Malcolm X
- Bibliography of Martin Luther King Jr.
