= Louis Lomax =

American journalist (1922–1970)

- Lomax in an undated photo
- Born: Louis Emanuel Lomax; August 16, 1922; Valdosta, Georgia, U.S.
- Died: July 30, 1970 (aged 47); Santa Rosa, New Mexico, U.S.
- Education: Paine College (1940–1942); American University (1945–1946)
- Occupations: Journalist, author
- Spouses: Betty Frank (m. 1958; div. 1961) Wanda Kay (m. 1961; div. 1967) Robinette Kirk (m. 1968–1970)

Louis Emanuel Lomax (August 16, 1922 – July 30, 1970) was an African-American journalist and author. He was also the first African-American television journalist.

== Early years ==
Lomax was born in Valdosta, Georgia. His parents were Emanuel C. Smith and Sarah Louise Lomax. Lomax attended Paine College in Augusta, Georgia for two years, where he later claimed he was editor of the student newspaper and had graduated in 1942. He subsequently attended American University, claiming he was awarded an M.A. in 1944, as well as claiming he attended Howard University and Yale University, where he had indicated he earned a Ph.D. in 1947. Despite reporting these credentials throughout his career, Lomax never completed a degree after his two years at Paine and his one year at American.

Lomax was married three times. His first wife was Betty Frank (1958–1961), his second was Wanda Kay (1961–1967), and his third was Robinette Kirk (1968–1970). He lived in Baldwin Harbor, New York.

== Career ==
Lomax began his journalism career at the Afro-American and the Chicago Defender. These two newspapers focused on news that interested African-American readers. In 1958, he became the first African-American television journalist when he joined WNTA-TV in New York.

In 1959, Lomax told his colleague Mike Wallace about the Nation of Islam. Lomax and Wallace produced a five-part documentary about the organization, The Hate That Hate Produced, which aired during the week of July 13, 1959. The program was the first time most white people heard about the Nation and its leader, Elijah Muhammad, as well as its charismatic spokesman, Malcolm X.

Lomax later became a freelance writer, and his articles were published in publications such as Harper's, Life, Pageant, The Nation, and The New Leader. His subjects included the Civil Rights Movement, the Nation of Islam, and the Black Panther Party. In 1961, he was awarded the Anisfield-Wolf Book Award for his book, The Reluctant African.

From 1964 to 1968, Lomax hosted a semi-weekly television program on KTTV in Los Angeles. Lomax also spoke frequently on college campuses.

Lomax was a supporter of several civil rights organizations, including the Congress of Racial Equality (CORE), the Student Nonviolent Coordinating Committee (SNCC), and the Southern Christian Leadership Conference (SCLC). In 1968, he signed the "Writers and Editors War Tax Protest" pledge, vowing to refuse tax payments in protest against U.S. involvement in the Vietnam War.

The Federal Bureau of Investigation maintained a file on Lomax containing over 150 pages. According to the Lowndes County Historical Society and Museum, the file "consists of letters, telegraphs, FBI inter-office memos, newspaper clippings; copies of speeches and several sheets headed FBI Deleted Page Information Sheet."

== Death ==
Lomax had received a $15,000 Esso Foundation grant and was writing a three-volume work about black history at the time of his death. On July 30, 1970, Lomax was returning to New York after completing a lecture tour on the West Coast when he died in a car accident along Interstate 40, 26 miles east of Santa Rosa, New Mexico. Witnesses reported that he was traveling at a high speed on the double-laned highway and lost control of his rented Ford station wagon while attempting to pass another motorist. An investigation by New Mexico State Police determined that Lomax was not wearing his seatbelt and was ejected from his car after it overturned three times. Pronounced dead at the scene, he died due to head and internal injuries. His body was identified by his Hofstra class ring.

Karl Evanzz, a staff writer for The Washington Post, wrote in his 1992 book The Judas Factor: The Plot to Kill Malcolm X that Lomax was working on a documentary concerning the role played by the FBI in the death of Malcolm X, and claimed that Lomax's own death may have been connected to that project.

== Selected works ==
- The Reluctant African (1960)
- The Negro Revolt (1962)
- When the Word Is Given: A Report on Elijah Muhammad, Malcolm X, and the Black Muslim World (1963)
- Thailand: The War That Is, The War That Will Be (1967)
- To Kill a Black Man: The Shocking Parallel in the Lives of Malcolm X and Martin Luther King Jr. (1968)
