= Ella Little-Collins =

American civil rights activist (1914–1996)

- Little-Collins in an undated photograph
- Born: Ella Mae Little; February 11, 1914; Butler, Georgia, U.S.
- Died: August 3, 1996 (aged 82); Boston, Massachusetts, U.S.
- Occupation: Activist
- Organizations: Nation of Islam; Organization of Afro-American Unity
- Children: 1
- Parents: Earl Little (father); Daisy Mason (mother)
- Relatives: Malcolm X (half-brother)

Ella Little-Collins (February 11, 1914 – August 3, 1996) was an American civil rights activist and the half-sister of Malcolm X. She was born in Butler, Georgia, to Earl Little and Daisy Little (née Mason); her paternal grandparents were John (Big Pa) Lee Little and Ella Little (née Gray), and her siblings were Mary Little and Earl Lee Little Jr. She had seven half-siblings from her father's second marriage: Wilfred, Philbert, Hilda, Reginald, Malcolm, Wesley, and Yvonne. She worked as congressman Adam Clayton Powell's secretary, the manager of her mother's grocery store, and an investor in house property, which she let out as rooming houses. She joined the Nation of Islam in the mid-1950s and helped establish its mosque in Boston and a day-care center attached to it, although she left the Nation in 1959 to become a Sunni Muslim. She supported black and ethnic studies programs in universities across the United States and founded the Sarah A. Little School of Preparatory Arts in Boston.

In his autobiography, Malcolm X wrote about the impact his first meeting with his half-sister had on him. She came to visit when he was in seventh grade, and he described her as "the first really proud black woman I had ever seen" and wrote: "I had never been so impressed with anybody." At the end of the school year, he moved to Roxbury to live with her, and she was his guardian until he turned 21. Her home, the Malcolm X—Ella Little-Collins House, is the last known surviving childhood home of Malcolm X. Its exterior was designated a Boston Landmark by the Boston Landmarks Commission in 1998, and was listed on the National Register of Historic Places in 2021.

Malcolm Little (left), two unknown women, and Little-Collins (right) in Franklin Park, Roxbury

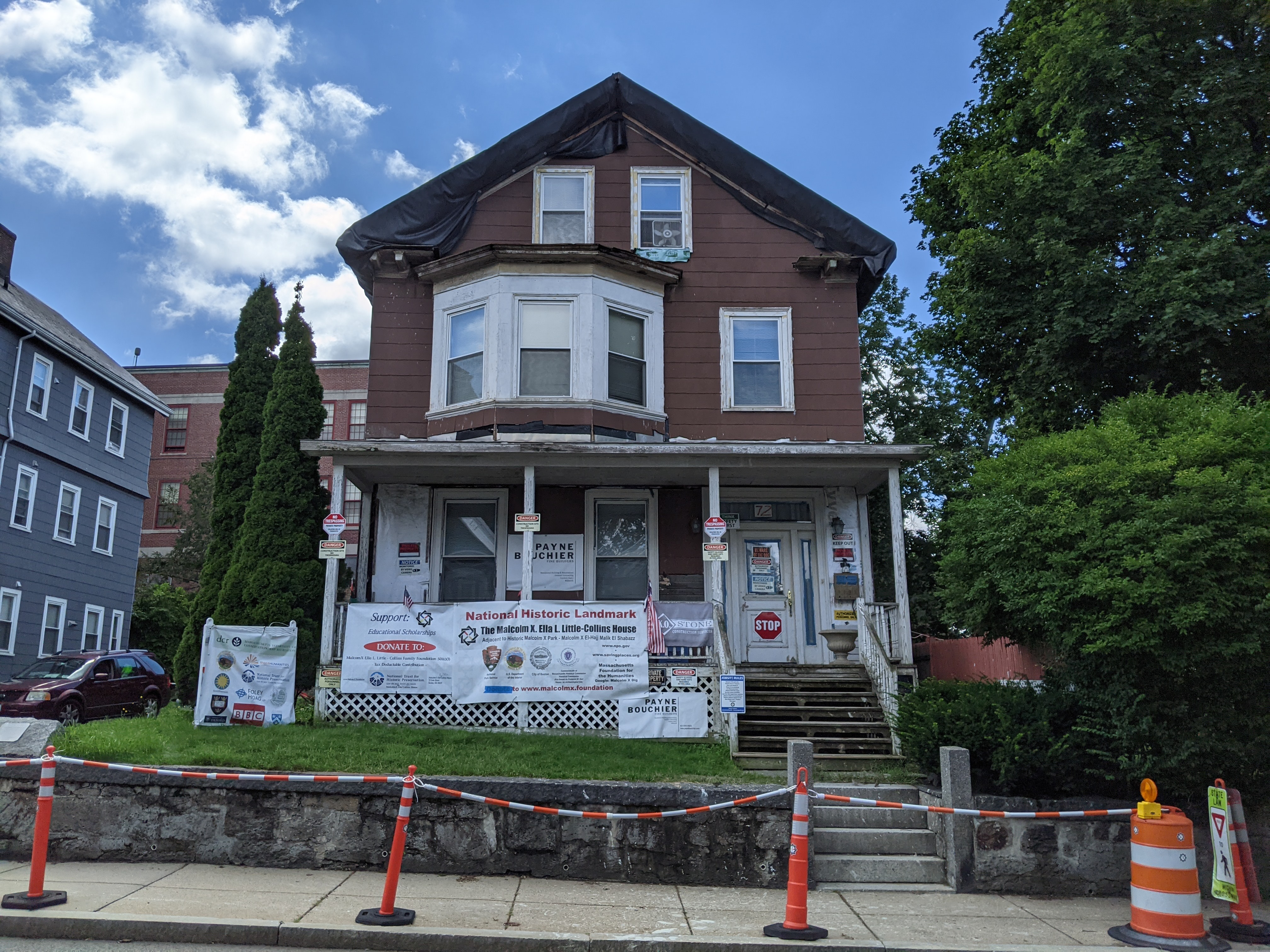
Malcolm X—Ella Little-Collins House

When Malcolm X left the Nation of Islam in 1964, Little-Collins paid for him to make the Hajj. She also paid his funeral and business expenses after his assassination, and took over his Organization of Afro-American Unity, including his project of giving 35 scholarships from Al-Azhar University in Cairo, Egypt, and from the University of Ghana to students wishing to study overseas. In 1986 she merged the Organization of Afro-American Unity with the African American Defense League.

In 1988, both of Little-Collins' legs were amputated due to gangrene. She died in 1996 at age 82.

The Ella Collins Institute at the Islamic Society of Boston Cultural Center is named after her; its goal is "to establish a vibrant community by joining a classical understanding of Islam with modern scholarship and a healthy understanding of the current cultural context."

== See also ==
- Bibliography of Malcolm X
- Bibliography of Martin Luther King Jr.
