= Malcolm X—Ella Little-Collins House =

Historic house in Massachusetts, United States

- U.S. National Register of Historic Places
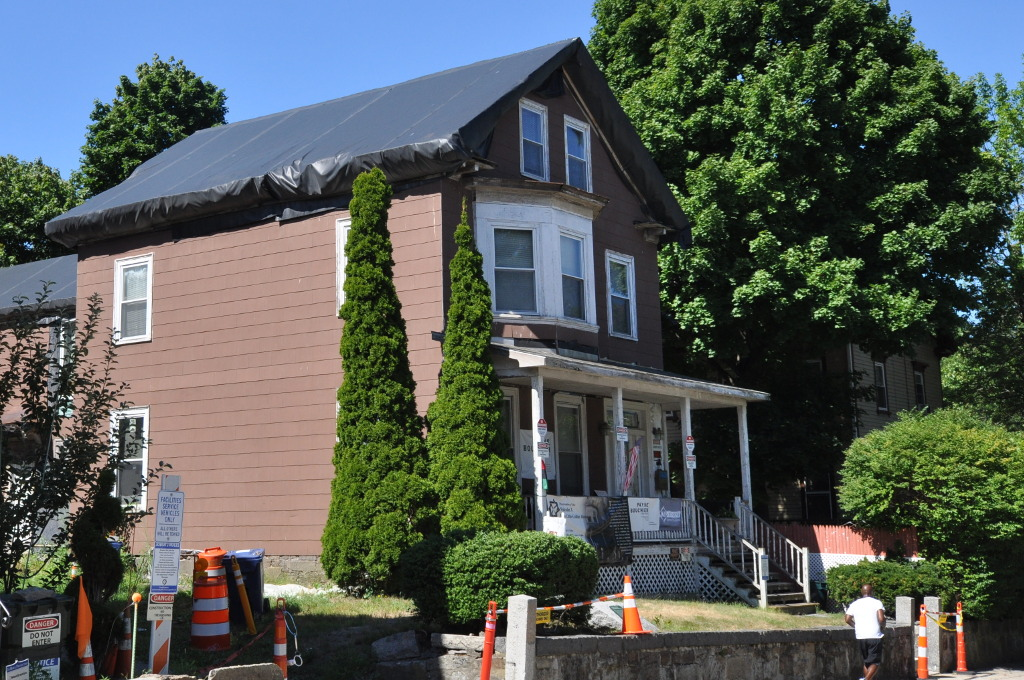

- Location within Massachusetts Location within the United States
- Location: 72 Dale St. Roxbury Boston, Massachusetts
- Coordinates: 42°19′17.5″N 71°5′11″W
- Area: 0.16 acres (0.065 ha)
- Built: 1874
- Architect: William Rumnil
- Architectural style: Queen Anne
- NRHP reference No.: 100005455
- Added to NRHP: February 12, 2021

The Malcolm X—Ella Little-Collins House is a historic house at 72 Dale Street in the Roxbury section of Boston, Massachusetts. Built in 1874, it was for many years home to Ella Little-Collins, a prominent local civil rights activist, and was home to her younger brother Malcolm X during his later teenage years. During this period Malcolm X was exposed to Islam, beginning his path to involvement in the Nation of Islam. The house was listed on the National Register of Historic Places in 2021, at which time it was still owned by the Collins family.

== Description and history ==
The Malcolm X—Ella Little-Collins House is located southwest of Roxbury's Nubian Square, on the south side of Dale Street just east of Malcolm X Park. The house is a 2 1/2-story wood-frame structure, set on a foundation of Roxbury puddingstone and covered by a gabled roof. Its exterior includes remnants of its original Queen Anne styling, while the interior retains a number of original period features. An Art Deco brick garage stands at the rear of the property.

The house was built in 1874 by William Rumnil, a local builder, on land that had previously been a country estate and farm. It was purchased in 1941 by Ella Little-Johnson, an African-American native of Georgia who moved to Boston as part of a major migration of African-Americans out of the southern United States. In that year, she also took in her brother Malcolm, who had been effectively orphaned by the institutionalization of his mother in 1939. It was Malcolm's primary residence until 1944. Malcolm's conversion to Islam (and adoption of the name "Malcolm X") began with exposure to the religion in Roxbury, and he returned to the neighborhood to establish a temple of the Nation of Islam in the 1950s. His sister Ella (who married Kenneth Collins in 1942) was also active in the Nation and other community organizations, and died here in 1996.

== See also ==
- National Register of Historic Places listings in southern Boston, Massachusetts
- Bibliography of Malcolm X
- Bibliography of Martin Luther King Jr.
