= The Hate That Hate Produced =

- Clockwise from top left: Mike Wallace, Malcolm X, Louis Lomax, Elijah Muhammad
- Starring: Elijah Muhammad; Malcolm X
- Narrated by: Mike Wallace

Production
- Producers: Mike Wallace; Louis Lomax
- Running time: Five half-hour installments
- Production company: News Beat

Original release
- Network: WNTA-TV
- Release: July 13 – July 17, 1959

The Hate That Hate Produced is a television documentary about black nationalism in the United States, focusing on the Nation of Islam and, to a lesser extent, the United African Nationalist Movement. It was produced in 1959 by Mike Wallace and Louis Lomax.

== Background ==
In 1959, Wallace and Lomax were television journalists for News Beat, a program on WNTA-TV (now WNET) in New York. Lomax told Wallace about the Nation of Islam, and Wallace became interested in the group. Lomax, who was African American, was given rare access to the organization. Accompanied by two White camera operators, Lomax conducted interviews with the Nation's leaders and filmed some of its events. The Hate That Hate Produced was broadcast in five parts during the week of July 13–17, 1959, and was repeated several days later.

== The program ==
The Hate That Hate Produced began with a narration by Wallace:

While city officials, state agencies, white liberals, and sober-minded Negroes stand idly by, a group of Negro dissenters is taking to street-corner step ladders, church pulpits, sports arenas, and ballroom platforms across the United States, to preach a gospel of hate that would set off a federal investigation if it were preached by Southern whites.

The cameras cut to a scene of Louis X (later known as Louis Farrakhan) indicting "the white man" for his crimes:

I charge the white man with being the greatest liar on Earth! I charge the white man with being the greatest drunkard on Earth.... I charge the white man with being the greatest gambler on Earth. I charge the white man, ladies and gentlemen of the jury, with being the greatest murderer on Earth. I charge the white man with being the greatest peace-breaker on Earth.... I charge the white man with being the greatest robber on Earth. I charge the white man with being the greatest deceiver on Earth. I charge the white man with being the greatest trouble-maker on Earth. So therefore, ladies and gentlemen of the jury, I ask you, bring back a verdict of guilty as charged!

Wallace returned to tell the audience:

The indictment you've just heard is being delivered over and over again in most of the major cities across the country. This charge comes at the climax of a morality play called The Trial. The plot, indeed the message of the play, is that the white man has been put on trial for his sins against the black man. He has been found guilty. The sentence is death. The play is sponsored, produced, by a Negro religious group who call themselves "The Muslims".

During the course of the program, Wallace told viewers more about the Nation of Islam, which he described as "the most powerful of the black supremacist groups". The documentary included footage of the University of Islam, a school run by the Nation, where, according to Wallace, "Muslim children are taught to hate the white man". It also showed portions of a large Nation of Islam rally, while Wallace told viewers that the organization had 250,000 members, a tremendously inflated number.

The Hate That Hate Produced included interviews between Lomax and Elijah Muhammad, the leader of the Nation of Islam. When Lomax asked him whether he was preaching hate, Muhammad answered that he was just teaching truth. Muhammad said he believed black people were divine and white people were devils. He also said that Allah was a black man.

The program also included Lomax's interviews with Malcolm X, the Nation of Islam's charismatic spokesman. Lomax asked him if all white people were evil, and Malcolm X explained that white people collectively were evil: "History is best qualified to reward all research, and we don't have any historic example where we have found that they have, collectively, as a people, done good." When he was asked about the Nation's schools, such as the University of Islam, Malcolm X denied that they taught black children to hate; he said they were being taught the same things white students were taught, "minus the 'Little Black Sambo' story and things that were taught to you and me when we were coming up, to breed that inferiority complex in us."

The program also includes interviews with James R. Lawson, the president of the United African Nationalist Movement, which advocated freedom for Africans from non-African rule. Lawson was asked about his relationship with African leaders of the time, notably President Gamal Abdel Nasser of Egypt. According to commentators Christopher Kyriakides and Rodolfo Torres, this aspect of the program "draws public attention to the significant threat that Black Nationalism, as an enemy within, is presumed to pose to American interests in the Middle East".

At the program's end, Wallace asked for support for black leaders who were "counseling patience and the relatively slow operation of legal measures". He said it was necessary to make the United States a nation that was truly "indivisible, with freedom and justice for all".

== Reaction and legacy ==
The Hate That Hate Produced had a strong impact on many of the millions of people who watched it. Most white viewers had not previously heard of the Nation of Islam and were surprised to learn that some Black people held such strong feelings toward white people. For many, it was their first exposure to a radical Black alternative to the Civil Rights Movement.

Some African Americans could not believe that black people were saying such things out loud, but more than a few agreed with them. The number of people attending Nation of Islam meetings increased significantly, and the group's membership doubled to 60,000 within weeks after the broadcast.

The Hate That Hate Produced catapulted Malcolm X to national attention. Although he had rarely been mentioned in the mainstream press before the program went out, Malcolm X soon became a frequent participant in television debates on race-related issues and one of the most sought-after speakers on college campuses across the United States.

=== Modern analysis ===
Some recent commentators feel that The Hate That Hate Produced was biased against the Nation of Islam. One writer said "its title reflected its severe view". Others have described it as "marked [by] a tendency to caricature", "blatantly one-sided", and a "piece of yellow journalism".

One of the first things Wallace said about Muhammad and Malcolm X was that they had served time in prison, a statement that seemed designed to call their leadership credentials into question and suggest the organization itself was criminal. Wallace referred to "this disturbing story" and used phrases such as "black supremacy", "black racism", and "gospel of hate" to frighten the white audience, critics say, and no effort was made to balance the presentation.

In his book White Violence, Black Response, Herbert Shapiro criticizes Wallace's opening comments that the Nation of Islam "preach[es] a gospel of hate that would set off a federal investigation if it were preached by Southern whites." He noted that some Southern whites—including state and local elected officials—did in fact preach such a gospel of hate, but the federal government had done almost nothing to stop their hate propaganda. Shapiro also argues that Wallace confused the Nation's rhetoric that condemned white people with a specific plan for violence against white people.
