= James Rupert Lawson =

African-American activist (1918–1985)

James R. Lawson
- Lawson interviewed on The Hate that Hate Produced in 1959
- Born: James Rupert Lawson; June 5, 1918; Macon, Georgia, U.S.
- Died: July 9, 1985 (aged 67); New York City, U.S.
- Occupations: publicist, activist
- Organization: United African Nationalist Movement
- Movement: Black nationalism, Pan-Africanism
- Spouse: Martha Lawson
- Children: 2

James Rupert Lawson (June 5, 1918 – July 9, 1985) was an African-American activist who founded the United African Nationalist Movement, an anti-imperialist lobbying group based in Harlem, advocating freedom for Africans from rule by non-Africans in the post World War II era.

A follower of the ideas of Marcus Garvey, he was associated with "black nationalist" ideology in the 1950s and 1960s.

== Early years ==
Lawson was born in Macon, Georgia, studying at high school there, then moving to New York, where he was based for the rest of his career. In the 1930s he participated in the Harlem Labor Union, founded by Ira Kemp. The organization had a Garveyite black nationalist philosophy, and was opposed by Frank Crosswaith's Negro Labor Committee.

== United African Nationalist Movement ==
In 1948 Lawson founded the United African Nationalist Movement (UANM), which lobbied for support for anti-Imperialist forces and promoted Pan-Africanism, in the tradition of Garvey. The UANM sponsored events such as Garvey Day in Harlem, a celebration of Garvey's work at which a "Miss Africa" was crowned.

In 1950 Lawson was imprisoned for breaching the peace when he and other UANM members protested at a local Catholic church over the church's alleged support for Italian imperialism dating back to Mussolini's invasion of Ethiopia. Lawson also regularly used the proximity of the United Nations headquarters to publicize the cause. According to fellow-activist Ora Mobley-Sweeting, "having the United Nations right there in New York city offered us the opportunity to approach this international body". Lawson would "set up picket lines at the United Nations, speaking out about African liberation."

The movement promoted links with independent African nations. In March 1957, the UANM held a dinner at the Hotel Theresa in Harlem for the ambassadors of Sudan, Morocco, and Tunisia, along with an envoy from Libya. The UANM opposed US support for European imperialism, such as supplying helicopters to France for use in the Algerian war of independence. Lawson believed that Europe and Africa should receive equal U.S. aid and endorsed more open support for anti-colonial activities. Lawson also wanted to set up a black-diaspora trading company to replace white-owned businesses that operated in South American and Caribbean countries.

In the 1959 documentary The Hate That Hate Produced Lawson's activities were linked to those of the Nation of Islam, the principal subject of the program, which addressed the rise of "black nationalism" in America. He was asked about his relationship with African leaders of the time, notably President Nasser of Egypt. According to commentators Rodolfo Torres and Christopher Kyriakides, this aspect of the program "draws public attention to the significant threat that Black Nationalism, as an enemy within, is presumed to pose to American interests in the Middle East". He was also quizzed about his support for politicians Adam Clayton Powell Jr. and Hulan Jack. He also defended his links with African leaders; criticized the NAACP because of its integrationist ideology and Jewish leadership; and defended a painting depicting Jesus as a black man, quoting scriptural passages.

In 1961 Lawson stated: "Mere crumbs from the tables of an abundant society have made millions of black men angry. That's why the black nationalist movement is growing and becoming more militant in New York and everywhere else. We believe that our future must be linked with that of our brothers in Africa." After the killing of Medgar Evers in 1963 he stated that black Americans should "arm themselves".

== Family and other activities ==
With his wife Martha, Lawson had two daughters, Kathryn Brown and Mary Birhane Lawson, and two grandchildren. He continued writing and activism into his later years. In the 1980s he campaigned for the legalization of the numbers game, in order to diminish the influence of organized crime.
