= Malcolm X =

American civil rights activist (1925–1965)

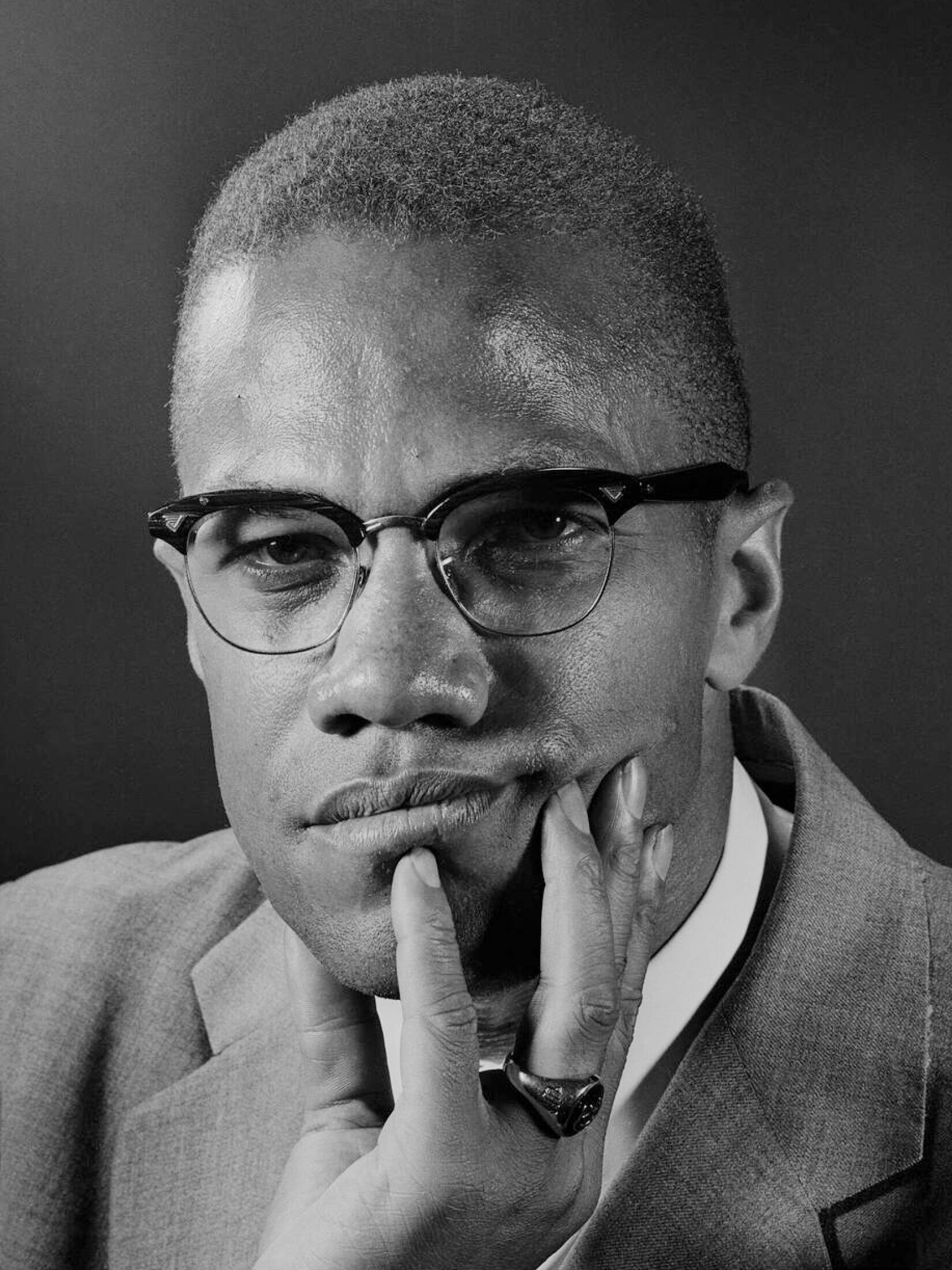
- Malcolm X in 1964
- Born: Malcolm Little; May 19, 1925; Omaha, Nebraska, U.S.
- Died: February 21, 1965 (aged 39); New York City, U.S.
- Cause of death: Assassination by gunshots
- Resting place: Ferncliff Cemetery
- Other names: Detroit Red; Malik el-Shabazz (Note: Arabic: مَالِك ٱلشَّبَازّ, romanized: Mālik ash-Shabāzz.); Omowale (Note: Translated from Yoruba as 'the son who has come back'.)
- Occupations: Minister; activist
- Organizations: Nation of Islam; Muslim Mosque, Inc.; Organization of Afro-American Unity
- Movement: Black nationalism; Pan-Africanism; Islamism
- Spouse: Betty Shabazz (m. 1958)
- Children: 6, including Attallah, Qubilah, and Ilyasah
- Parents: Earl Little (father); Louise Langdon (mother)
- Relatives: Malcolm Shabazz (grandson)

Malcolm X (born Malcolm Little, later el-Hajj Malik el-Shabazz; (Note: Arabic: الْحَجّ مَالِك ٱلشَّبَازّ, romanized: Al-Ḥajj Mālik ash-Shabāzz.) May 19, 1925 – February 21, 1965) was an African American revolutionary, civil rights leader, and Muslim minister who was a prominent figure during the civil rights movement until his assassination in 1965. He discovered the new religious movement the Nation of Islam while in prison and served as a spokesperson from 1952 until he converted to Sunni Islam in 1964. He is often regarded as one of the most significant Muslim figures in the history of the United States. A controversial figure accused of preaching violence, Malcolm X is also a celebrated figure within the African American community for his pursuit of racial justice and equality.

Malcolm spent his adolescence living in a series of foster homes and with various relatives, after his father's death and his mother's hospitalization. In 1946, he was sentenced to eight to ten years in prison for larceny and burglary. While there, he joined the Nation of Islam, adopting the name Malcolm X to symbolize his unknown African ancestral surname while discarding "the white slavemaster name of 'Little'", and after his parole in 1952, he quickly became one of the organization's most influential leaders. He was the public face of the organization for 12 years, advocating black empowerment and separation of Black and white Americans, as well as criticizing Martin Luther King Jr. and the mainstream civil rights movement for its emphasis on non-violence and racial integration. Malcolm X also expressed pride in some of the Nation's social welfare achievements such as its free drug rehabilitation program. From the 1950s onward, Malcolm X was subjected to surveillance by the Federal Bureau of Investigation (FBI).

In the 1960s, Malcolm X began to grow disillusioned with the Nation of Islam and its leader Elijah Muhammad. He subsequently embraced Sunni Islam and the mainstream civil rights movement after completing the Hajj to Mecca and became known as "el-Hajj Malik el-Shabazz", which roughly translates to "The Pilgrim Malcolm the Patriarch". After a brief period of travel across Africa, he publicly renounced the Nation of Islam and founded the Islamic MMI and the Pan-African Organization of Afro-American Unity (OAAU). Throughout 1964, his conflict with the Nation of Islam intensified and he was repeatedly sent death threats. On February 21, 1965, he was assassinated in New York City. Three Nation of Islam members were charged with the murder and given indeterminate life sentences. In 2021, two of the convictions were vacated. Speculation about the assassination and whether it was conceived or aided by leading or additional members of the Nation, or with law enforcement agencies, has persisted for decades.

Malcolm X was posthumously honored with Malcolm X Day on which he is commemorated in various cities across the United States, with Berkeley and Oakland city offices and schools closed. Hundreds of streets and schools in the United States have been renamed in his honor, while the Audubon Ballroom, the site of his assassination, was partly redeveloped in 2005 to accommodate the Malcolm X and Dr. Betty Shabazz Memorial and Educational Center.

Malcolm X's ideas were an important influence on the Black power movement. His autobiography, on which he collaborated with Alex Haley, was published posthumously in 1965.

== Early years ==
=== Childhood ===
Malcolm X was born May 19, 1925, at University Hospital in Omaha, Nebraska. He was the fourth of seven children of Louise Little (née Langdon), born in Grenada, and Reverend Earl Little, born in Reynolds, Georgia. Earl was an outspoken Baptist minister and both he and Louise, a seamstress, were admirers of Pan-African activist Marcus Garvey. Malcolm had ten siblings; his older siblings were Wilfred, Hilda and Philbert and his younger siblings were Reginald, Wesley, Yvonne (1929–2003), and Robert. Malcolm also had older half-siblings from his father's first marriage, Ella (1914–1996), Mary and Earl Jr. Earl was the local leader of the Universal Negro Improvement Association (UNIA) and Louise served as secretary and "branch reporter", sending news of local UNIA activities to Negro World; they inculcated self-reliance and black pride in their children.

The family home was located at 3448 Pinkney Street and was designated a historical site by the National Register of Historic Places. Malcolm later said that white violence killed four of his father's brothers. Due to threats by members of the Ku Klux Klan that Earl's UNIA activities were said to be "spreading trouble", the family were forced to flee to Milwaukee in 1926, and shortly thereafter to Lansing, Michigan. In Lansing, his parents were sued for eviction from their newly purchased home due to a covenant that prevented the sale to non-white buyers. They were frequently harassed by the Black Legion, a white supremacist group who Earl later accused of burning down their family home in 1929. No fire truck was dispatched to their home to extinguish the blaze.

In 1931, when Malcolm was six years old, his father Earl died unexpectedly, in what has been officially ruled a streetcar accident. His mother Louise believed Earl had been murdered by the Black Legion. Rumors that local members were responsible for his father's death were widely circulated and were very disturbing to Malcolm X as a child. As an adult, he expressed conflicting beliefs on the question. After a dispute with creditors, Louise received a life insurance benefit (nominally $1,000 ‍—‌about $21,000 in 2025) in payments of $18 per month; the issuer of another, larger policy refused to pay, claiming her husband Earl died by suicide. To make ends meet, Louise rented out part of her garden and her sons hunted game.

During the 1930s, white Seventh-day Adventists witnessed to the Little family; later on, Louise Little and her son Wilfred were baptized into the Seventh-day Adventist Church. Malcolm said the Adventists were "the friendliest white people" he ever saw.

In 1937, a man Louise had been dating‍—‌marriage had seemed a possibility‍—‌vanished from her life when she became pregnant with his child. In late 1938, she had a nervous breakdown and was committed to Kalamazoo State Hospital. The children were separated and sent to foster homes. Malcolm and his siblings secured her release 24 years later.

Malcolm attended West Junior High School in Lansing and then Mason High School in Mason, Michigan, but left high school in 1941 before graduating. He excelled in junior high school but dropped out of high school after a white teacher told him that practicing law, his aspiration at the time, was "no realistic goal for a nigger". Later, Malcolm X recalled feeling that the white world offered no place for a career-oriented black man regardless of talent.

=== Criminal career ===
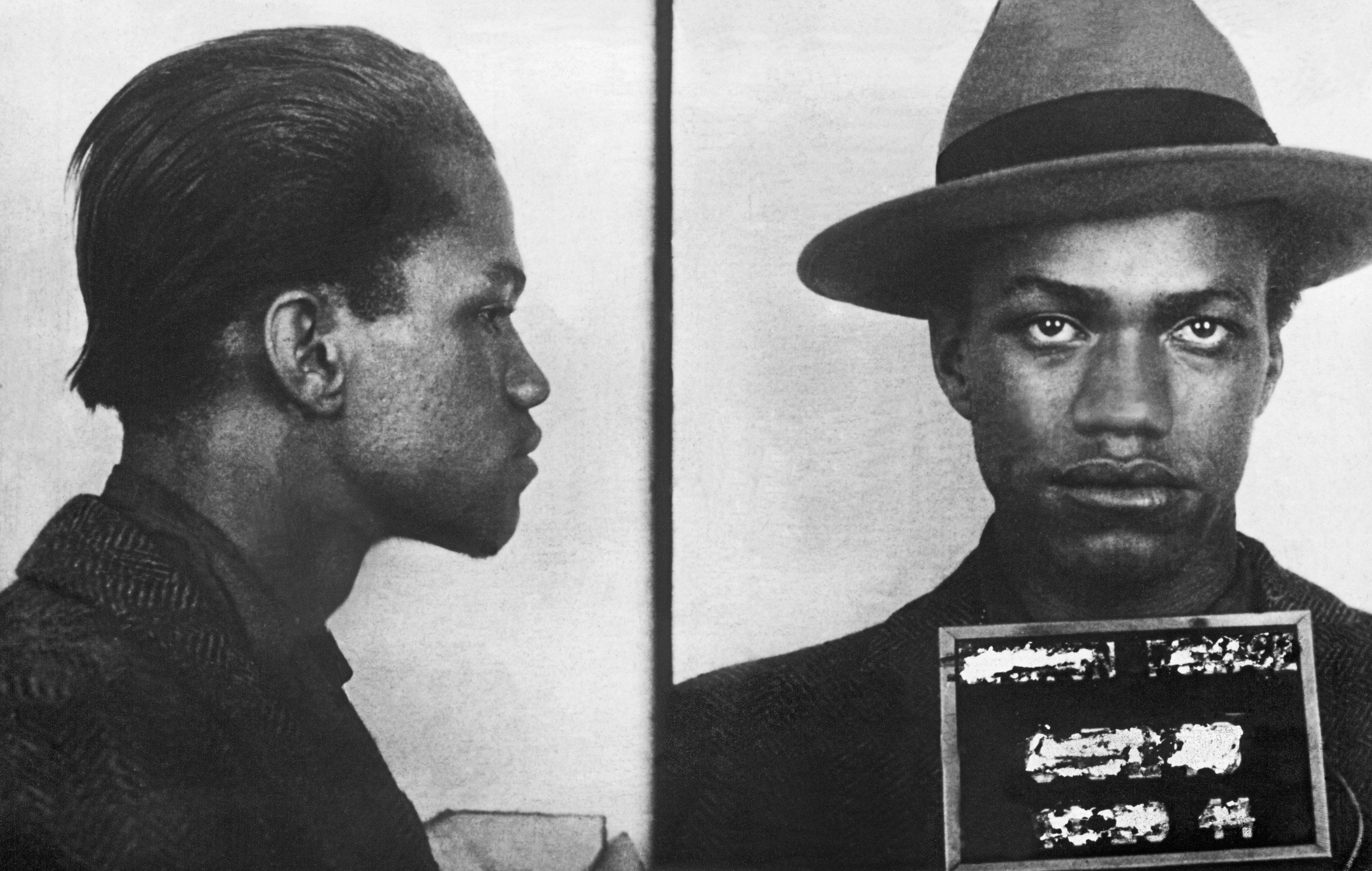
A Boston police mug shot of Malcolm taken in 1944, following his arrest for larceny

From ages 14 to 21, Malcolm held a variety of jobs while living with his half-sister Ella Little-Collins in Roxbury, a largely African American neighborhood of Boston.

After a short time in Flint, Michigan, Malcolm moved to Harlem in 1943, where he found employment on the New Haven Railroad and engaged in drug dealing, gambling, racketeering, robbery, and pimping. According to biographer Bruce Perry, Malcolm also occasionally had sex with other men, usually for money, though this conjecture has been disputed by those who knew him. (Note: The accuracy of these accounts has been questioned by some people who met Malcolm X later in life or never knew him, including Ta-Nehisi Coates, Maulana Karenga, Ilyasah Shabazz, and Raymond Winbush. For further information, see Phelps, Polk, and Street et al.) He befriended John Elroy Sanford, a fellow dishwasher at Jimmy's Chicken Shack in Harlem who aspired to be a professional comedian. Both men had reddish hair, so Sanford was called "Chicago Red" after his hometown, and Malcolm was known as "Detroit Red". Years later, Sanford became famous as comedian and actor Redd Foxx.

Summoned by the local draft board for military service in World War II in late 1943, he feigned mental disturbance by rambling and declaring: "I want to be sent down South. Organize them nigger soldiers ... steal us some guns, and kill us [some] crackers". He was then declared "mentally disqualified for military service".

In late 1945, Malcolm returned to Boston where he and four accomplices committed a series of burglaries targeting wealthy white families. In 1946, he was arrested while picking up a stolen watch he had left at a shop for repairs, and in February began serving a sentence of eight to ten years at Charlestown State Prison for larceny and breaking and entering. In 1947, he was transferred to Concord Reformatory where he served 15 months before transferring again to Norfolk Prison Colony.

== The Nation of Islam ==
=== Prison ===
Between Mr. Muhammad's teachings, my correspondence, my visitors ... and my reading of books, months passed without my even thinking about being imprisoned. In fact, up to then, I had never been so truly free in my life.

— Malcolm X

When Malcolm was in prison, he met fellow convict John Bembry, a self-educated man he would later describe as "the first man I had ever seen command total respect ... with words". Under Bembry's influence, Malcolm developed a voracious appetite for reading.

At this time, several of his siblings wrote to him about the Nation of Islam, a relatively new religious movement preaching black self-reliance and, ultimately, the return of the African diaspora to Africa (which was then undergoing the process of independence), where they would be free from white American and European domination. He showed scant interest at first, but after his brother Reginald wrote in 1948, "Malcolm, don't eat any more pork and don't smoke any more cigarettes. I'll show you how to get out of prison", he almost instantly quit smoking and began to refuse pork.

Following a visit during which Reginald detailed the group's teachings, including the notion that white people are considered devils, Malcolm initially struggled to accept this belief. Over time, however, Malcolm reflected on his past relationships with white individuals and concluded that they had all been marked by dishonesty, injustice, greed, and hatred. Malcolm, whose hostility to Christianity had earned him the prison nickname "Satan", became receptive to the message of the Nation of Islam.

In late 1948, Malcolm wrote to Elijah Muhammad, the leader of the Nation of Islam. Muhammad advised him to renounce his past, humbly bow in prayer to God and promise never to engage in destructive behavior again. Though he later recalled the inner struggle he had before bending his knees to pray, Malcolm soon became a member of the Nation of Islam, maintaining a regular correspondence with Muhammad.

In 1950, the FBI opened a file on Malcolm after he wrote a letter from prison to President Harry S. Truman expressing opposition to the Korean War and declaring himself a communist. That year, he also began signing his name "Malcolm X". Muhammad instructed his followers to leave their family names behind when they joined the Nation of Islam and use "X" instead. When the time was right, after they had proven their sincerity, he said, he would reveal the Muslim's "original name". In his autobiography, Malcolm X explained that the "X" symbolized the true African family name that he could never know. "For me, my 'X' replaced the white slavemaster name of 'Little' which some blue-eyed devil named Little had imposed upon my paternal forebears."

=== Early ministry ===
After his parole in August 1952, Malcolm X visited Elijah Muhammad in Chicago. In June 1953, he was named assistant minister of the Nation's Temple Number One in Detroit. (Note: Nation of Islam Temples were numbered according to the order in which they were established.) Later that year he established Boston's Temple Number 11; in March 1954, he expanded Temple Number 12 in Philadelphia; and two months later he was selected to lead Temple Number 7 in Harlem, where he rapidly expanded its membership.

In 1953, the FBI began surveillance of him, turning its attention from Malcolm X's possible communist associations to his rapid ascent in the Nation of Islam.

During 1955, Malcolm X continued his successful recruitment of members on behalf of the Nation of Islam. He established temples in Springfield, Massachusetts (Number 13); Hartford, Connecticut (Number 14); and Atlanta (Number 15). Hundreds of African Americans were joining the Nation of Islam every month.

Besides his skill as a speaker, Malcolm X had an impressive physical presence. He stood 6 feet 3 inches (1.91 m) tall and weighed about 180 pounds (82 kg). One writer described him as "powerfully built", and another as "mesmerizingly handsome ... and always spotlessly well-groomed".

=== Marriage and family ===
In 1955, Betty Sanders met Malcolm X after one of his lectures, then again at a dinner party; soon she was regularly attending his lectures. In 1956, she joined the Nation of Islam, changing her name to Betty X. One-on-one dates were contrary to the Nation's teachings, so the couple courted at social events with dozens or hundreds of others, and Malcolm X made a point of inviting her on the frequent group visits he led to New York City's museums and libraries.

Malcolm X proposed during a telephone call from Detroit in January 1958, and they married two days later. They had six daughters: Attallah (born 1958; Arabic for 'gift of God'); (Note: Attallah Shabazz has said she was not named after Attila, rather her name is Arabic for "the gift of God".) (Note: "People have to understand the [Autobiography of Malcolm X] was written at a time when indeed African Americans were likening themselves to warriors to underscore our revolutionary fervor. And Attallah was close to Attila the Hun, the warrior. But I'm named Attallah, which in Arabic means 'Gift of God.' I've never been Attila.") Qubilah (born 1960, named after Kublai Khan); Ilyasah (born 1962, named after Elijah Muhammad); Gamilah Lumumba (born 1964, named after Gamal Abdel Nasser and Patrice Lumumba); and twins Malikah (1965–2021) and Malaak (born 1965, both born after their father's death and named in his honor).

=== Hinton Johnson incident ===
The American public first became aware of Malcolm X in 1957, after Hinton Johnson, (Note: Some sources, including The Autobiography of Malcolm X, give the name Johnson Hinton, but Benjamin Karim (one of Malcolm X's top aides) and former Newsweek editor and Malcolm X biographer Peter Goldman both give the name Hinton Johnson.) a Nation of Islam member, was beaten by two New York City police officers. On April 26, Johnson and two other passersby‍—‌also Nation of Islam members‍—‌saw the officers beating an African American man with nightsticks. When they attempted to intervene, shouting, "You're not in Alabama ... this is New York!" one of the officers turned on Johnson, beating him so severely that he suffered brain contusions and subdural hemorrhaging. All four African American men were arrested.

Alerted by a witness, Malcolm X and a small group of Muslims went to the police station and demanded to see Johnson. Police initially denied that any Muslims were being held, but when the crowd grew to about five hundred, they allowed Malcolm X to speak with Johnson. Afterward, Malcolm X insisted on arranging for an ambulance to take Johnson to Harlem Hospital.

Johnson's injuries were treated and by the time he was returned to the police station, some four thousand people had gathered outside. Inside the station, Malcolm X and an attorney were making bail arrangements for two of the Muslims. Johnson was not bailed, and police said he could not go back to the hospital until his arraignment the following day. Considering the situation to be at an impasse, Malcolm X stepped outside the station house and gave a hand signal to the crowd. Nation members silently left, after which time the rest of the crowd also dispersed.

One police officer told the New York Amsterdam News: "No one man should have that much power." Within a month the New York City Police Department arranged to keep Malcolm X under surveillance; it also made inquiries with authorities in other cities in which he had lived, and prisons in which he had served time. A grand jury declined to indict the officers who beat Johnson. In October, Malcolm X sent an angry telegram to the police commissioner. Soon the police department assigned undercover officers to infiltrate the Nation of Islam.

=== Increasing prominence ===
By the late 1950s, Malcolm X was using a new name, Malcolm Shabazz or el-Hajj Malik el-Shabazz ("The Pilgrim Malcolm the Patriarch"), although he was still widely referred to as Malcolm X. His comments on issues and events were being widely reported, in print and on radio and television. He was featured in a 1959 New York City television broadcast about the Nation of Islam, The Hate That Hate Produced.

In September 1960, at the United Nations General Assembly in New York City, Malcolm X was invited to the official functions of several African nations. He met Gamal Abdel Nasser of Egypt, Ahmed Sékou Touré of Guinea, and Kenneth Kaunda of the Zambian African National Congress. Fidel Castro also attended the Assembly, and Malcolm X met publicly with him as part of a welcoming committee of Harlem community leaders. Castro was sufficiently impressed with Malcolm X to suggest a private meeting, and after two hours of talking, Castro invited Malcolm X to visit Cuba. After the meeting, X publicly praised Castro, stating that he was "the only white person I ever liked". While X admired Castro, he told the FBI during an interrogation after the meeting, that he could never be a communist, because according to X, communists do not believe in God.

=== Advocacy and teachings while with the Nation ===
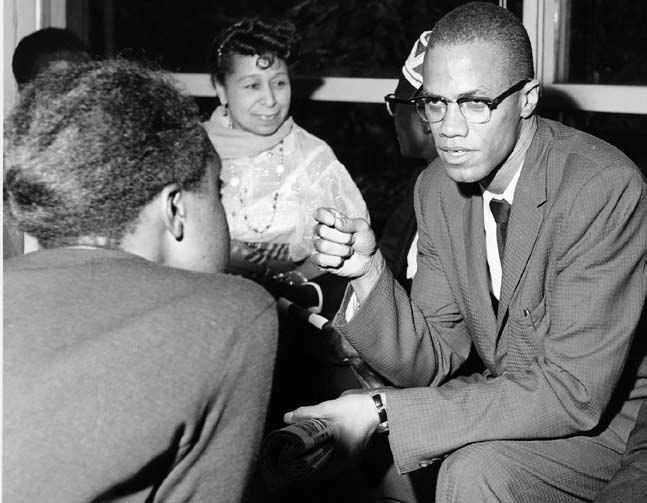
Malcolm X speaking to members of the African-American Students Foundation. (1959)

From his adoption of the Nation of Islam in 1952 until he broke with it in 1964, Malcolm X promoted the Nation's teachings. These included beliefs:

- That black people are the original people of the world
- That white people are "devils" and
- That the demise of the white race is imminent.

Louis E. Lomax said that "those who don't understand biblical prophecy wrongly label him as a racist and as a hate teacher, or as being anti-white or as teaching black Supremacy". One of the goals of the civil rights movement was to end disenfranchisement of African Americans, but the Nation of Islam forbade its members from participating in voting and other aspects of the political process. The NAACP and other civil rights organizations denounced him and the Nation of Islam as irresponsible extremists whose views did not represent the common interests of African Americans.

Malcolm X had been equally critical of the civil rights movement. During this period, he denounced Martin Luther King Jr. as a "chump", and referred to other civil rights leaders as being "stooges" of the white establishment and was strongly against any kind of racial integration. (Note: King expressed mixed feelings toward Malcolm X. "He is very articulate ... but I totally disagree with many of his political and philosophical views ... I don't want to seem to sound self-righteous ... or that I think I have the only truth, the only way. Maybe he does have some of the answer ... I have often wished that he would talk less of violence, because violence is not going to solve our problem. And in his litany of articulating the despair of the Negro without offering any positive, creative alternative, I feel that Malcolm has done himself and our people a great disservice ... [U]rging Negroes to arm themselves and prepare to engage in violence, as he has done, can reap nothing but grief." However, the veracity of this quote as recorded by Alex Haley has been called into question by Jonathan Eigs, given that it does not appear on the original interview transcript.) He called the 1963 March on Washington "the farce on Washington", and said he did not know why so many black people were excited about a demonstration "run by whites in front of a statue of a president who has been dead for a hundred years and who didn't like us when he was alive".

In 1961, Malcolm X spoke at an NOI rally alongside George Lincoln Rockwell, the head of the American Nazi Party. Rockwell saw overlap between black nationalism and white supremacy. While the civil rights movement fought against racial segregation, Malcolm X advocated the complete separation of African Americans from whites. He proposed that African Americans should return to Africa and that, in the interim, a separate country for black people in America should be created. He rejected the civil rights movement's strategy of nonviolence, arguing that black people should defend and advance themselves "by any means necessary". His speeches had a powerful effect on his audiences, who were generally African Americans in northern and western cities. Many of them‍—‌tired of being told to wait for freedom, justice, equality and respect‍—‌felt that he articulated their complaints better than did the civil rights movement.

=== Effect on Nation membership ===
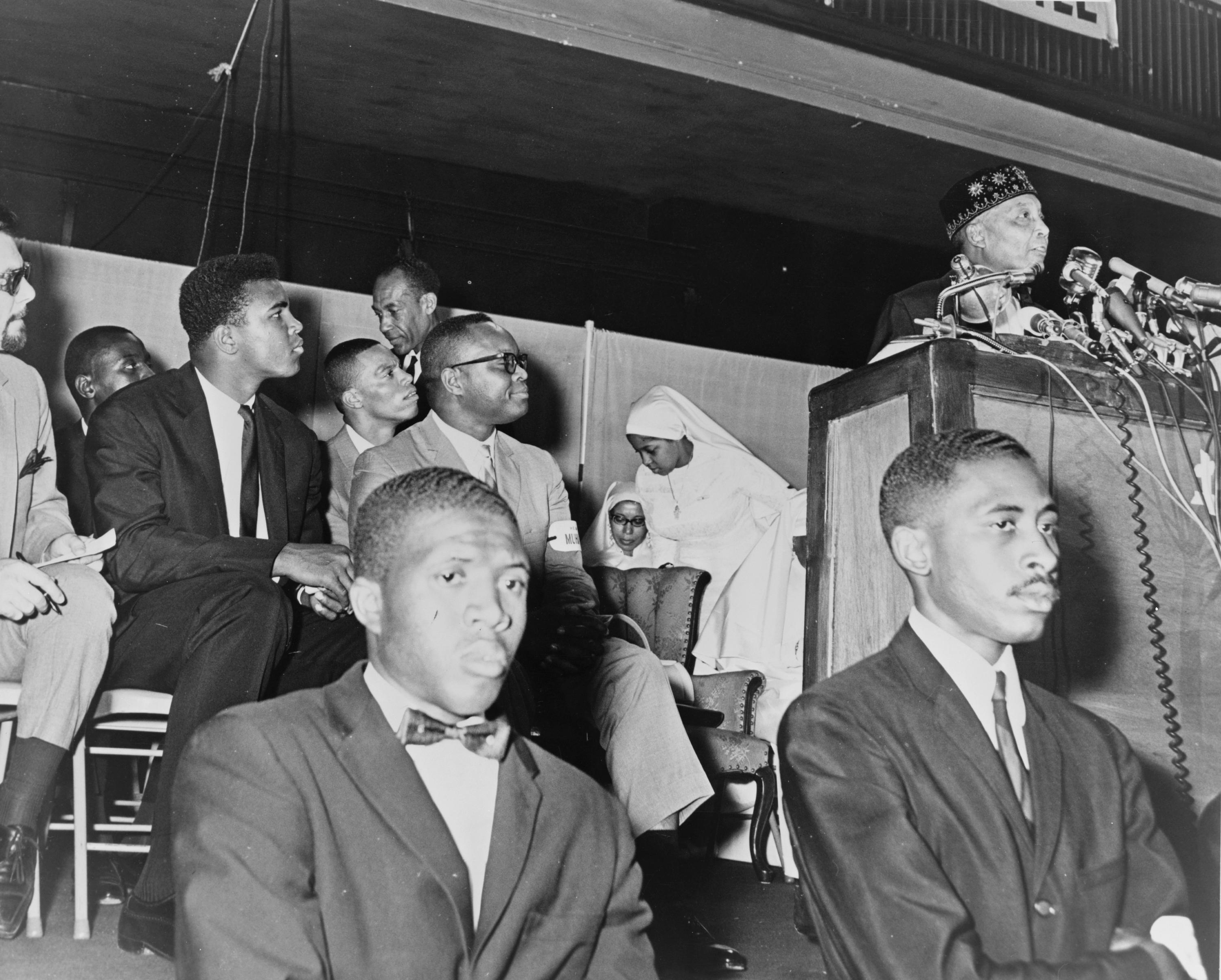
Muhammad Ali (second row, in dark suit) watches Elijah Muhammad speak, 1964

Malcolm X is widely regarded as the second most influential leader of the Nation of Islam after Elijah Muhammad. He is largely credited with helping the group's dramatic increase in membership between the early 1950s and early 1960s—from around 1,200 to between 50,000 and 100,000 members, with up to 25,000 actively attending, according to estimates. (Note: "Estimates of the Black Muslim membership vary from a quarter of a million down to fifty thousand. Available evidence indicates that about one hundred thousand Negroes have joined the movement at one time or another, but few objective observers believe that the Black Muslims can muster more than twenty or twenty-five thousand active temple people.") (Note: "The common response of Malcolm X to questions about numbers‍—‌'Those who know aren't saying, and those who say don't know'‍—‌was typical of the attitude of the leadership.")

He inspired the boxer Muhammad Ali to join the Nation, and the two became close. In January 1964, Ali brought Malcolm X and his family to Miami to watch him train for his fight against Sonny Liston. When Malcolm X left the Nation of Islam, he tried to convince Ali (who had just been renamed by Elijah Muhammad) to join him in converting to Sunni Islam, but Ali instead broke ties with him, later describing the break as one of his greatest regrets. (Note: "Turning my back on Malcolm was one of the mistakes that I regret most in my life. I wish I'd been able to tell Malcolm that I was sorry, that he was right about so many things. But he was killed before I got the chance ... I might never have become a Muslim if it hadn't been for Malcolm. If I could go back and do it over again, I would never have turned my back on him.")

Malcolm X mentored and guided Louis X (later known as Louis Farrakhan), who eventually became the leader of the Nation of Islam. Malcolm X also served as a mentor and confidant to Elijah Muhammad's son, Wallace D. Muhammad; the son told Malcolm X about his skepticism toward his father's "unorthodox approach" to Islam. Wallace Muhammad was excommunicated from the Nation of Islam several times, although he was eventually re-admitted.

== Disillusionment and departure ==
During 1962 and 1963, events caused Malcolm X to reassess his relationship with the Nation of Islam, and particularly its leader, Elijah Muhammad.

=== Lack of Nation of Islam response to LAPD violence ===
In late 1961, there were violent confrontations between the Nation of Islam members and police in South Central Los Angeles, and numerous Muslims were arrested. They were acquitted, but tensions had been raised. Just after midnight on April 27, 1962, two LAPD officers, unprovoked, shoved and beat several Muslims outside Temple Number 27. A large crowd of angry Muslims emerged from the mosque and the officers attempted to intimidate them.

One officer was disarmed; his partner was shot in the elbow by a third officer. More than 70 backup officers arrived who then raided the mosque and randomly beat Nation of Islam members. Police officers shot seven Muslims, including William X Rogers, who was hit in the back and paralyzed for life, and Ronald Stokes, a Korean War veteran, who was shot from behind while raising his hands over his head to surrender, killing him.

A number of Muslims were indicted after the event, but no charges were laid against the police. The coroner ruled that Stokes's killing was justified. To Malcolm X, the desecration of the mosque and the associated violence demanded action, and he used what Louis X (later Louis Farrakhan) later called his "gangsterlike past" to rally the more hardened of the Nation of Islam members to take violent revenge against the police.

Malcolm X sought Elijah Muhammad's approval which was denied, stunning Malcolm X. Malcolm X was again blocked by Elijah Muhammad when he spoke of the Nation of Islam starting to work with civil rights organizations, local black politicians, and religious groups. Louis X saw this as an important turning point in the deteriorating relationship between Malcolm X and Muhammad.

=== Sexual misbehavior by Elijah Muhammad ===
Rumors were circulating that Muhammad was conducting extramarital affairs with young Nation secretaries‍—‌which would constitute a serious violation of Nation teachings. After first discounting the rumors, Malcolm X came to believe them after he spoke with Muhammad's son Wallace and the girls making the accusations in April 1963. Muhammad confirmed the rumors that same year, attempting to justify his behavior by referring to precedents set by Biblical prophets.

Over a series of national TV interviews between 1964 and 1965, Malcolm X provided testimony of his investigation, corroboration, and confirmation by Elijah Muhammad himself of multiple counts of child rape. During this investigation, he learned that seven of the eight girls had become pregnant as a result of this. He also revealed an assassination attempt made on his life, through a discovered explosive device in his car, as well as the death threats he was receiving, in response to his exposure of Elijah Muhammad.

=== Remarks on Kennedy assassination ===
On December 1, 1963, when asked to comment on the assassination of John F. Kennedy, Malcolm X said that it was a case of "chickens coming home to roost". He added that "chickens coming home to roost never did make me sad; they've always made me glad." Likewise, according to The New York Times:

[I]n further criticism of Mr. Kennedy, the Muslim leader cited the murders of Patrice Lumumba, Congo leader, of Medgar Evers, civil rights leader, and of the Negro girls bombed earlier this year in a Birmingham church. These, he said, were instances of other "chickens coming home to roost".

The remarks prompted widespread public outcry. The Nation of Islam, which had sent a message of condolence to the Kennedy family and ordered its ministers not to comment on the assassination, publicly censured their former shining star. Malcolm X retained his post and rank as minister but was prohibited from public speaking for 90 days.

=== Media attention to Malcolm X over Elijah Muhammad ===
Malcolm X had by now become a media favorite, and some Nation members believed he was a threat to Elijah Muhammad's leadership. Publishers had shown interest in Malcolm X's autobiography, and when Louis Lomax wrote his 1963 book about the Nation, When the Word Is Given, he used a photograph of Malcolm X on the cover. He also reproduced five of his speeches but featured only one of Muhammad's, which greatly upset Muhammad and made him envious.

=== Departure from Nation of Islam ===
On March 8, 1964, Malcolm X publicly announced his break from the Nation of Islam. Though still a Muslim, he felt that the Nation had "gone as far as it can" because of its rigid teachings. He said he was planning to organize a black nationalist organization to "heighten the political consciousness" of African Americans. He also expressed a desire to work with other civil rights leaders, saying that Elijah Muhammad had prevented him from doing so in the past.

== Activity after leaving Nation of Islam ==
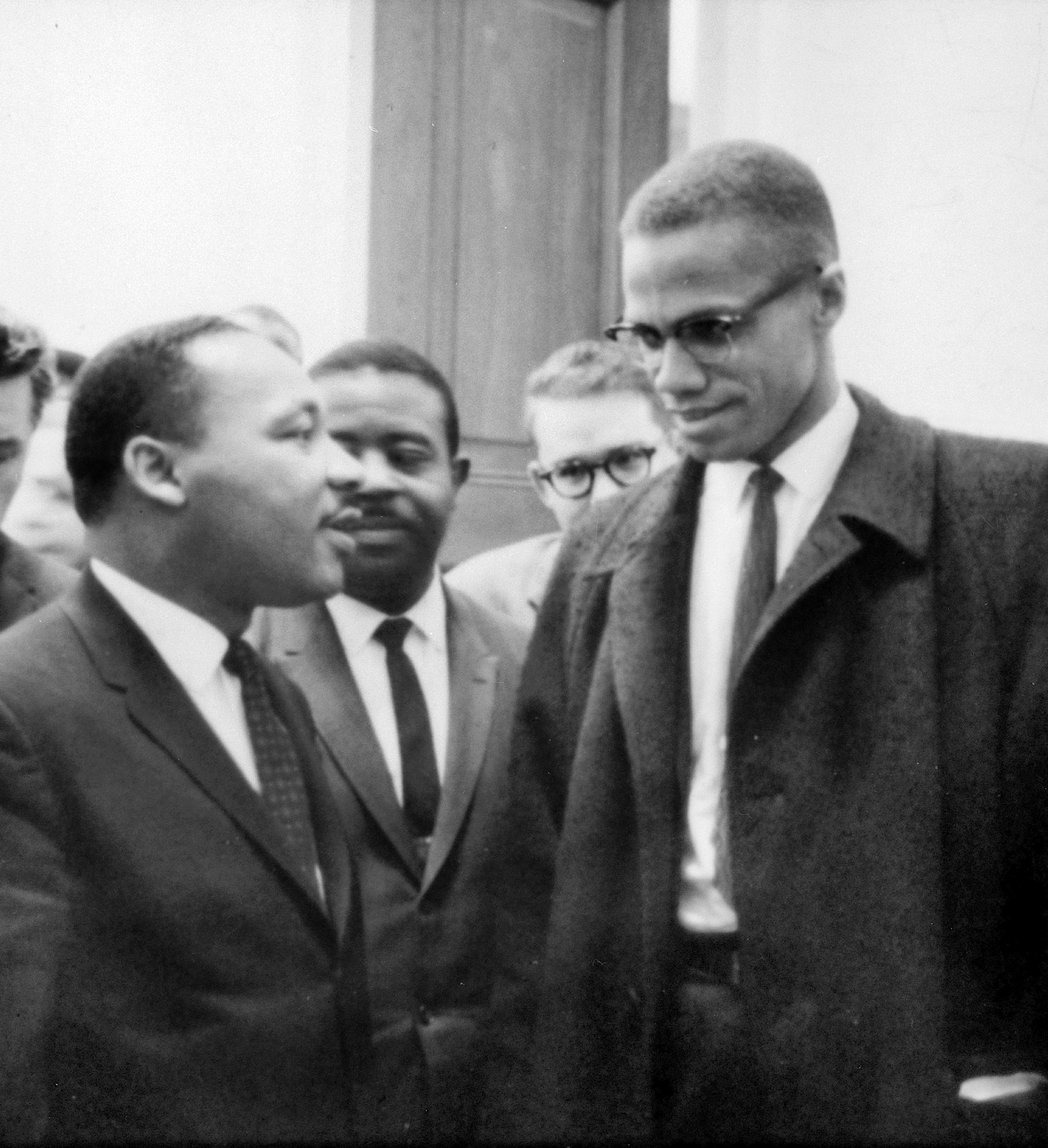
Malcolm X's only meeting with Martin Luther King Jr., March 26, 1964, during the Senate debates regarding the (eventual) Civil Rights Act of 1964.

After leaving the Nation of Islam, Malcolm X founded Muslim Mosque, Inc. (MMI), a religious organization, and the Organization of Afro-American Unity (OAAU), a secular group that advocated Pan-Africanism. On March 26, 1964, he briefly met Martin Luther King Jr. for the first and only time‍—‌and only long enough for photographs to be taken‍—‌in Washington, D.C., as both men attended the Senate's debate on the Civil Rights bill at the US Capitol building. (Note: "There was no time for substantive discussions between the two. They were photographed greeting each other warmly, smiling and shaking hands.") (Note: "Camera shutters clicked. The next day, the Chicago Sun-Times, the New York World-Telegram and Sun, and other dailies carried a picture of Malcolm and Martin shaking hands.")

In April, Malcolm X gave a speech titled "The Ballot or the Bullet", in which he advised African Americans to exercise their right to vote wisely but cautioned that if the government continued to prevent African Americans from attaining full equality, it might be necessary for them to take up arms.

In the weeks after he left the Nation of Islam, several Sunni Muslims encouraged Malcolm X to learn about their faith. He soon converted to the Sunni faith.

=== Pilgrimage to Mecca ===
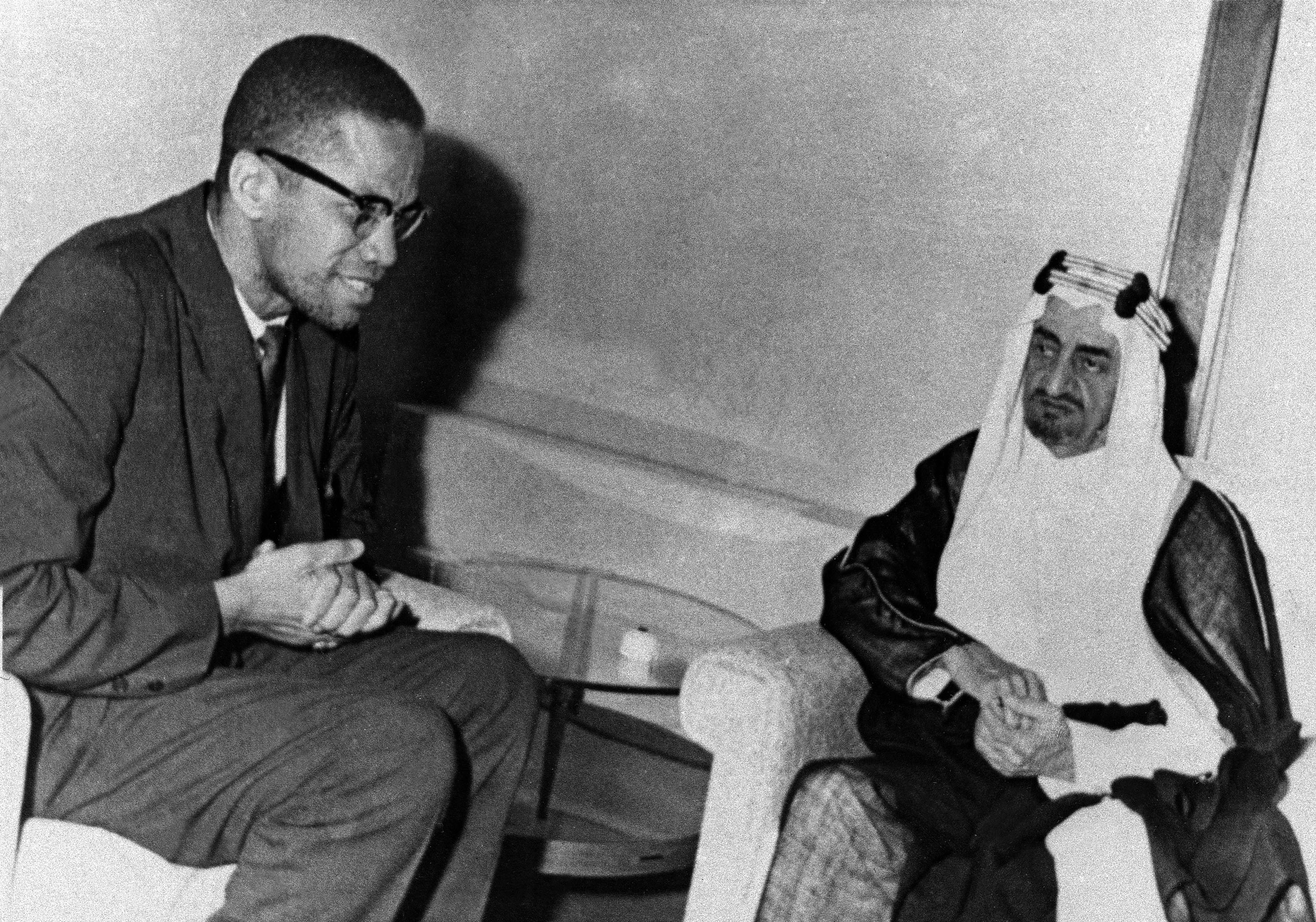
Malcolm X meeting with Prince Faisal bin Abdulaziz (1964)

In April 1964, with financial help from his half-sister Ella Little-Collins, Malcolm X flew to Jeddah, Saudi Arabia, as the start of his Hajj, the pilgrimage to Mecca obligatory for every Muslim who is able to do so. He was delayed in Jeddah when his US citizenship and inability to speak Arabic caused his status as a Muslim to be questioned.

He had received Abdul Rahman Hassan Azzam's book The Eternal Message of Muhammad with his visa approval, and he contacted the author. Azzam's son arranged for his release and lent him his personal hotel suite. The next morning Malcolm X learned that Prince Faisal had designated him as a state guest. Several days later, after completing the Hajj rituals, Malcolm X had an audience with the prince.

Malcolm X later said that seeing Muslims of "all colors, from blue-eyed blonds to black-skinned Africans", interacting as equals led him to see Islam as a means by which racial problems could be overcome.

Slavery in Saudi Arabia had been abolished only two years before his visit to Saudi Arabia, and his portrayal of racial harmony in the Arab world was a reply to the widespread criticism of African chattel slavery in Saudi Arabia from the African-American press in the US.

=== Visit to Africa ===
Malcolm X had already visited the United Arab Republic (a short-lived political union between Egypt and Syria), Sudan, Nigeria, and Ghana in 1959 to make arrangements for a tour of Africa by Elijah Muhammad. After his pilgrimage to Mecca in April 1964, he visited Africa a second time. He returned to the United States in late May and flew to Africa again in July. During these visits he met officials, gave interviews, and spoke on radio and television in Egypt, Ethiopia, Tanganyika, Nigeria, Ghana, Guinea, Sudan, Senegal, Liberia, Algeria and Morocco.

In Cairo, he attended the second meeting of the Organization of African Unity as a representative of the OAAU. By the end of this third visit, he had met with essentially all of Africa's prominent leaders; Kwame Nkrumah of Ghana, Gamal Abdel Nasser of Egypt, and Ahmed Ben Bella of Algeria had all invited Malcolm X to serve in their governments. After he spoke at the University of Ibadan, the Nigerian Muslim Students Association bestowed on him the honorary Yoruba title Omowale ('the son who has come home'). He later called this his most treasured honor.

Malcolm especially hated Moïse Tshombe of the Congo as an "Uncle Tom" figure. In a 1964 speech in New York, he called Tshombe "the worst African ever born" and "the man who in cold blood, cold blood, committed an international crime; murdered Patrice Lumumba". Tshombe's decision in 1964 to hire white mercenaries to put down the Simba rebellion greatly offended Malcolm, who accused the mercenaries of committing war crimes against the Congolese.

=== France and United Kingdom ===
On November 23, 1964, on his way home from Africa, Malcolm X stopped in Paris, where he spoke in the Salle de la Mutualité. After his return to the United States, he accused the United States of imperialism in the Congo by supporting Tshombe and "his hired killers" as he called the white mercenaries. X accused Tshombe and the American president Lyndon B. Johnson of "...sleeping together. When I say sleeping together, I don't mean that literally. But beyond that, they're in the same bed. Johnson is paying the salaries, paying the government, propping up Tshombe's government, this murderer".

X expressed much anger about Operation Dragon Rouge, where the United States Air Force dropped Belgian paratroopers into the city of Stanleyville, modern Kisangani, to rescue the white Belgian hostages from the Simbas. Malcolm X maintained that there was a double standard when it came to white and black lives, noting it was an international emergency when the lives of whites were in danger, making Dragon Rouge necessary, but that nothing was done to stop the abuses of the Congolese at the hands of "Tshombe's hired killers". X charged that the "Congolese have been massacred by white people for years and years" and that "chickens come home to roost".

A week later, on November 30, Malcolm X flew to the United Kingdom. On December 3 he took part in a debate at the Oxford Union Society. The motion was taken from a statement made earlier that year by US presidential candidate Barry Goldwater: "Extremism in the Defense of Liberty is No Vice; Moderation in the Pursuit of Justice is No Virtue". Malcolm X argued for the affirmative, and interest in the debate was so high that it was televised nationally by the BBC.

In his address at Oxford, Malcolm rejected the label of "black Muslim" and instead focused on being a Muslim who happened to be black, which reflected his conversion to Sunni Islam. Malcolm only mentioned his religion twice during his Oxford speech, which was part of his effort to defuse his image as an "angry black Muslim extremist", which he had long hated. During the debate at Oxford, he criticized the way the Anglo-American press portrayed the Congo crisis, noting the Simbas were portrayed as primitive cannibalistic "savages" who engaged in every form of depravity imaginable while Tshombe and the white mercenaries were portrayed in a very favorable light with almost no mention of any atrocities on their part.

Malcolm X charged that the Cuban émigré pilots hired by the CIA to serve as Tshombe's air force indiscriminately bombed Congolese villages and towns, killing women and children, but this was almost never mentioned in the media while the newspapers featured long accounts of the Simbas "raping white women, molesting nuns". Likewise, he felt the term mercenary was inappropriate, preferring the term "hired killer" and that Tshombe should not be described as a premier as he preferred the term "cold-blooded murderer" to describe him. Malcolm X stated that what he regarded as the extremism of the Tshombe government was "never referred to as extremism because it is endorsed by the West, it is financed by America, it's made respectable by America, and that kind of extremism is never labelled as extremism".

Malcolm X argued this extremism was not morally acceptable "since it's not extremism in defense of liberty". Many in the audience at Oxford were angered by Malcolm X's thesis and his support for the Simbas who had committed atrocities with one asking, "What sort of extremism would you consider the killing of missionaries?". In response, Malcolm X answered "It is an act of war. I'd call it the same kind of extremism that happened when England dropped bombs on German cities and Germans dropped bombs on English cities".

On February 5, 1965, Malcolm X flew to the UK again, and on February 8 he addressed the first meeting of the Council of African Organizations in London. The next day he tried to return to France, but was refused entry. On February 12, he visited Smethwick, near Birmingham, where the Conservative Party had won the parliamentary seat in the 1964 general election. The town had become a byword for racial division after the successful candidate, Peter Griffiths, was accused of using the slogan, "If you want a nigger for a neighbour, vote Liberal or Labour." In Smethwick, Malcolm X compared the treatment of ethnic minority residents with the treatment of Jews under Hitler, saying: "I would not wait for the fascist element in Smethwick to erect gas ovens."

=== Return to United States ===
After returning to the US, Malcolm X addressed a wide variety of audiences. He spoke regularly at meetings held by MMI and the OAAU, and was one of the most sought-after speakers on college campuses. One of his top aides later wrote that he "welcomed every opportunity to speak to college students". He also addressed public meetings of the Socialist Workers Party, speaking at their Militant Labor Forum. He was interviewed on the subjects of segregation and the Nation of Islam by Robert Penn Warren for Warren's 1965 book Who Speaks for the Negro?

== Death threats and intimidation from the Nation of Islam ==
Malcolm X guards his family after Nation of Islam threats in an iconic Ebony magazine photo.

Throughout 1964, as his conflict with the Nation of Islam intensified, Malcolm X was repeatedly threatened.

In February, a leader of Temple Number Seven ordered the bombing of Malcolm X's car. In March, Muhammad told Boston minister Louis X (later known as Louis Farrakhan) that "hypocrites like Malcolm should have their heads cut off"; the April 10 edition of Muhammad Speaks featured a cartoon depicting Malcolm X's bouncing, severed head.

On June 8, FBI surveillance recorded a telephone call in which Betty Shabazz was told that her husband was "as good as dead". Four days later, an FBI informant received a tip that "Malcolm X is going to be bumped off." That same month, the Nation sued to reclaim Malcolm X's residence in East Elmhurst, Queens, New York. His family was ordered to vacate but on February 14, 1965‍—‌the night before a hearing on postponing the eviction‍—‌the house was destroyed by fire.

On July 9, Muhammad aide John Ali (suspected of being an undercover FBI agent) referred to Malcolm X by saying, "Anyone who opposes the Honorable Elijah Muhammad puts their life in jeopardy." In the December 4 issue of Muhammad Speaks, Louis X wrote that "such a man as Malcolm is worthy of death."

Ebony dramatized Malcolm X's defiance of these threats by publishing a photograph of him holding an M1 carbine while peering out of a window.

== Assassination ==
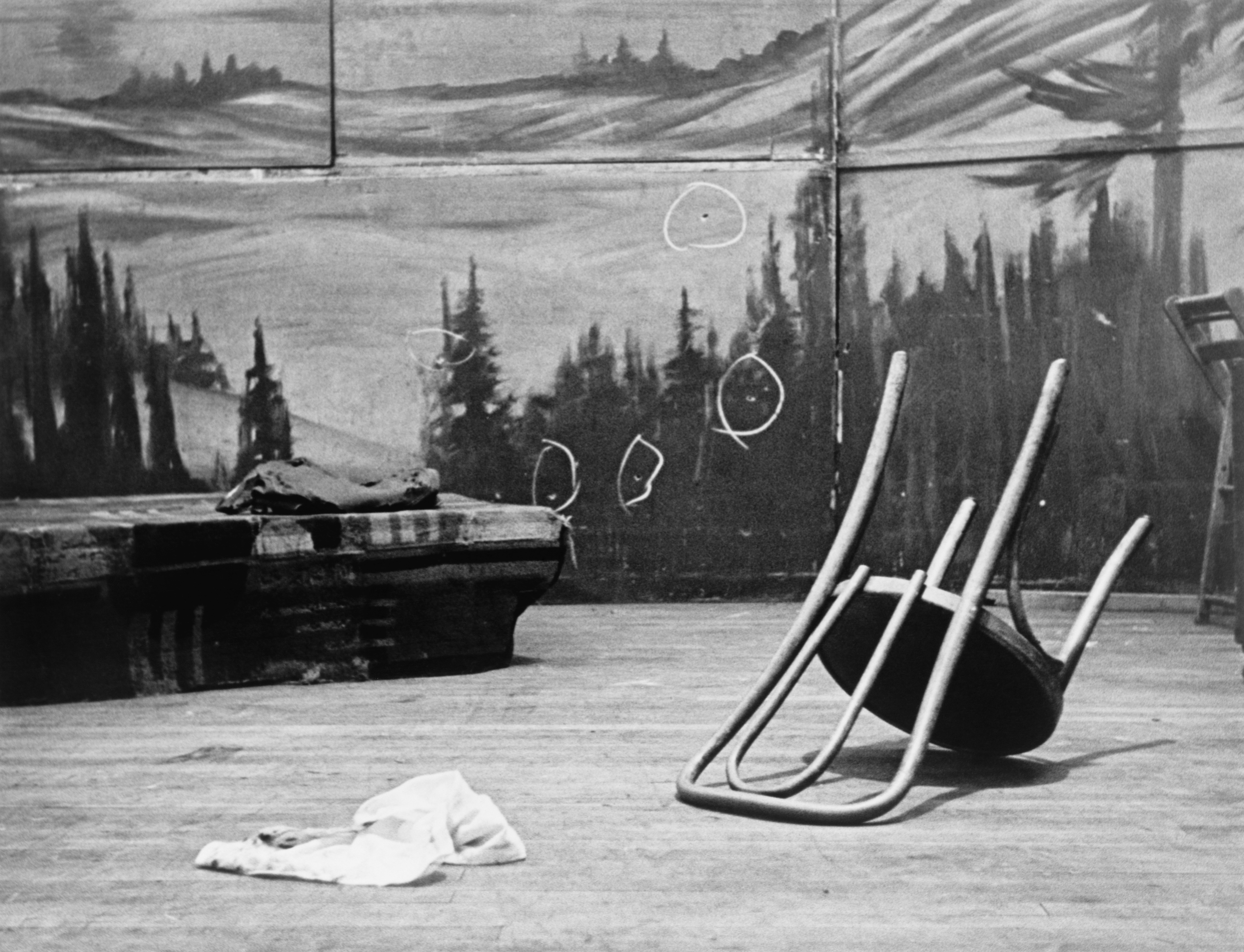
The stage of the Audubon Ballroom after Malcolm X's assassination, with bullet holes circled

External image
- "The Violent End of the Man Called Malcolm", LIFE, March 5, 1965. Photos taken moments after the fatal shots were fired, including one of activist Yuri Kochiyama cradling the dying Malcolm X's head.

On February 19, 1965, Malcolm X told interviewer Gordon Parks that the Nation of Islam was actively trying to kill him. On February 21, 1965, he was preparing to address the OAAU in Manhattan's Audubon Ballroom when someone in the 400-person audience yelled, "Nigger! Get your hand outta my pocket!"

As Malcolm X and his bodyguards tried to quell the disturbance, (Note: In his Epilogue to The Autobiography of Malcolm X, Haley wrote that Malcolm X said, "Hold it! Hold it! Don't get excited. Let's cool it, brothers" (p. 499). According to a transcript of an audio recording, Malcolm's only words were, "Hold it!", repeated ten times (DeCaro, p. 274).) a man rushed forward and shot him once in the chest with a sawed-off shotgun and two other men charged the stage firing semi-automatic handguns. Malcolm X was pronounced dead at 3:30 pm, shortly after arriving at Columbia Presbyterian Hospital. The autopsy identified 21 gunshot wounds to the chest, left shoulder, arms and legs, including ten buckshot wounds from the initial shotgun blast.

One gunman, Nation of Islam member Talmadge Hayer (also known as Thomas Hagan), was beaten by the crowd before police arrived. Witnesses identified the other gunmen as Nation members Norman 3X Butler and Thomas 15X Johnson. All three were convicted of murder in March 1966 and sentenced to life in prison.

At trial, Hayer confessed, but refused to identify the other assailants except to assert that they were not Butler and Johnson. In 1977 and 1978, he signed affidavits reasserting Butler's and Johnson's innocence, naming four other Nation members of Newark's Mosque No. 25 as participants in the murder or its planning. These affidavits did not result in the case being reopened.

Butler, today known as Muhammad Abdul Aziz, was paroled in 1985 and became the head of the Nation's Harlem mosque in 1998; he maintains his innocence. In prison, Johnson, who changed his name to Khalil Islam, rejected the Nation's teachings and converted to Sunni Islam. Released in 1987, he maintained his innocence until his death in August 2009. Hayer, who also rejected the Nation's teachings while in prison and also converted to Sunni Islam, is known today as Mujahid Halim. He was paroled in 2010.

In 2021, Muhammad Abdul Aziz and Khalil Islam (formerly Norman 3X Butler and Thomas 15X Johnson) were exonerated from their murder convictions, following a review that found the FBI and the New York Police Department withheld key evidence during the trial. On July 14, 2022, Aziz filed suit in the US District Court in Brooklyn against the City of New York, seeking $40 million in damages related to his wrongful imprisonment.

Les Payne and Tamara Payne, in their Pulitzer Prize-winning biography The Dead Are Arising: The Life of Malcolm X, claim that the assassins were members of the Nation of Islam's Newark, New Jersey mosque: William 25X (also known as William Bradley), who fired the shotgun; Leon Davis; and Thomas Hayer.

=== Funeral ===
The public viewing, February 23–26 at Unity Funeral Home in Harlem, was attended by some 14,000 to 30,000 mourners. For the funeral on February 27, loudspeakers were set up for the overflow crowd outside Harlem's thousand-seat Faith Temple of the Church of God in Christ, and a local television station carried the service live.

Among the civil rights leaders attending were John Lewis, Bayard Rustin, James Forman, James Farmer, Jesse Gray, and Andrew Young. Actor and activist Ossie Davis delivered the eulogy, describing Malcolm X as "our shining black prince ... who didn't hesitate to die because he loved us so":

There are those who will consider it their duty, as friends of the Negro people, to tell us to revile him, to flee, even from the presence of his memory, to save ourselves by writing him out of the history of our turbulent times. Many will ask what Harlem finds to honor in this stormy, controversial and bold young captain‍—‌and we will smile. Many will say turn away‍—‌away from this man, for he is not a man but a demon, a monster, a subverter and an enemy of the black man‍—‌and we will smile. They will say that he is of hate‍—‌a fanatic, a racist‍—‌who can only bring evil to the cause for which you struggle! And we will answer and say to them: Did you ever talk to Brother Malcolm? Did you ever touch him, or have him smile at you? Did you ever really listen to him? Did he ever do a mean thing? Was he ever himself associated with violence or any public disturbance? For if you did you would know him. And if you knew him you would know why we must honor him.... And, in honoring him, we honor the best in ourselves.

Malcolm X was buried at Ferncliff Cemetery in Hartsdale, New York. Friends took up the gravediggers' shovels to complete the burial on their own.

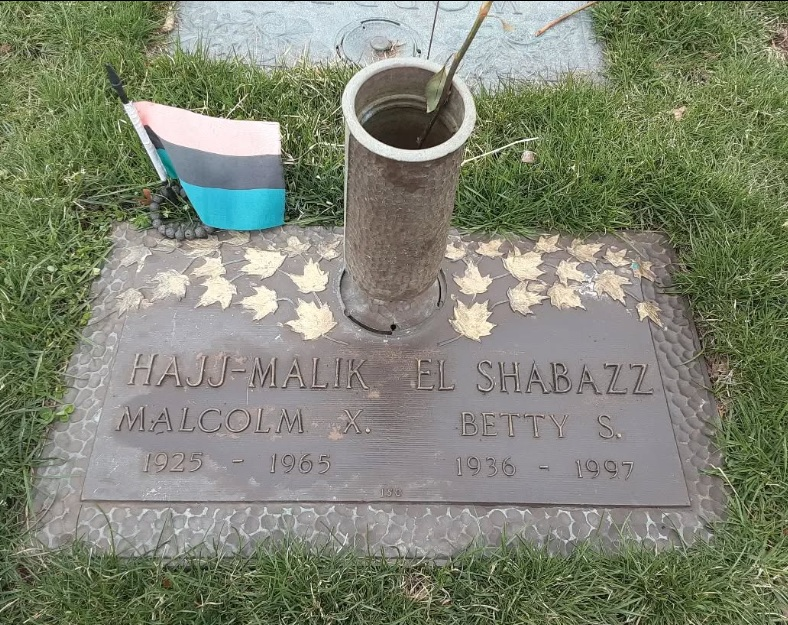
Grave plaque for Malcolm X and his wife at Ferncliff Cemetery

Actor and activist Ruby Dee and Juanita Poitier (wife of Sidney Poitier) established the Committee of Concerned Mothers to raise money for a home for his family and for his children's educations.

=== Reactions ===
Reactions to Malcolm X's assassination were varied. In a telegram to Betty Shabazz, Martin Luther King Jr. expressed his sadness at "the shocking and tragic assassination of your husband". He said:

While we did not always see eye to eye on methods to solve the race problem, I always had a deep affection for Malcolm and felt that he had a great ability to put his finger on the existence and root of the problem. He was an eloquent spokesman for his point of view and no one can honestly doubt that Malcolm had a great concern for the problems that we face as a race.

Elijah Muhammad told the annual Savior's Day convention on February 26 that "Malcolm X got just what he preached," but denied any involvement with the murder. "We didn't want to kill Malcolm and didn't try to kill him," Muhammad said, adding "We know such ignorant, foolish teachings would bring him to his own end."

Writer James Baldwin, who had been a friend of Malcolm X's, was in London when he heard the news of the assassination. He responded with indignation towards the reporters interviewing him, shouting, "You did it! It is because of you—the men that created this white supremacy—that this man is dead. You are not guilty, but you did it.... Your mills, your cities, your rape of a continent started all this."

The New York Post wrote that "even his sharpest critics recognized his brilliance‍—‌often wild, unpredictable and eccentric, but nevertheless possessing promise that must now remain unrealized." The New York Times wrote that Malcolm X was "an extraordinary and twisted man" who "turn[ed] many true gifts to evil purpose" and that his life was "strangely and pitifully wasted". Time called him "an unashamed demagogue" whose "creed was violence".

Outside the US, particularly in Africa, the press was sympathetic. The Daily Times of Nigeria wrote that Malcolm X would "have a place in the palace of martyrs". The Ghanaian Times likened him to John Brown, Medgar Evers, and Patrice Lumumba, and counted him among "a host of Africans and Americans who were martyred in freedom's cause".

In China the People's Daily described Malcolm X as a martyr killed by "ruling circles and racists" in the United States; his assassination, the paper wrote, demonstrated that "in dealing with imperialist oppressors, violence must be met with violence." The Guangming Daily, also published in Beijing, stated that "Malcolm was murdered because he fought for freedom and equal rights." In Cuba, El Mundo described the assassination as "another racist crime to eradicate by violence the struggle against discrimination."

In a weekly column he wrote for the New York Amsterdam News, King reflected on Malcolm X and his assassination:

Malcolm X came to the fore as a public figure partially as a result of a TV documentary entitled, The Hate that Hate Produced. That title points to the nature of Malcolm's life and death.

Malcolm X was clearly a product of the hate and violence invested in the Negro's blighted existence in this nation....

In his youth there was no hope, no preaching, teaching or movements of non-violence....

It is a testimony to Malcolm's personal depth and integrity that he could not become an underworld Czar, but turned again and again to religion for meaning and destiny. Malcolm was still turning and growing at the time of his brutal and meaningless assassination.…

Like the murder of Lumumba, the murder of Malcolm X deprives the world of a potentially great leader. I could not agree with either of these men, but I could see in them a capacity for leadership which I could respect, and which was just beginning to mature in judgment and statesmanship.

=== Allegations of conspiracy ===
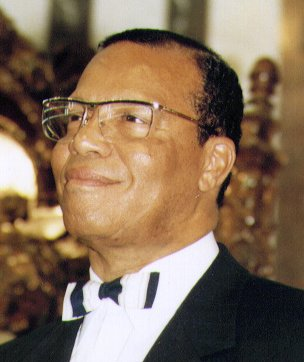
Louis Farrakhan in 2005

Within days the question of who bore responsibility for the assassination was being publicly debated. On February 23, James Farmer, leader of the Congress of Racial Equality, announced at a news conference that local drug dealers, and not the Nation of Islam, were to blame. Others accused the NYPD, the FBI, or the CIA, citing the lack of police protection, the ease with which the assassins entered the Audubon Ballroom, and the failure of the police to preserve the crime scene. Earl Grant, one of Malcolm X's associates who was present at the assassination, later wrote:

[A]bout five minutes later, a most incredible scene took place. Into the hall sauntered about a dozen policemen. They were strolling at about the pace one would expect of them if they were patrolling a quiet park. They did not seem to be at all excited or concerned about the circumstances.

I could hardly believe my eyes. Here were New York City policemen, entering a room from which at least a dozen shots had been heard, and yet not one of them had his gun out! As a matter of absolute fact, some of them even had their hands in their pockets.

In the 1970s, the public learned about COINTELPRO and other secret FBI programs established to infiltrate and disrupt civil rights organizations during the 1950s and 1960s. Louis Lomax wrote that John Ali, national secretary of the Nation of Islam, was a former FBI agent. Malcolm X had confided to a reporter that Ali exacerbated tensions between him and Elijah Muhammad and that he considered Ali his "archenemy" within the Nation of Islam leadership. Ali had a meeting with Talmadge Hayer, one of the men convicted of killing Malcolm X, the night before the assassination.

The Shabazz family are among those who have accused Louis Farrakhan of involvement in Malcolm X's assassination. In a 1993 speech Farrakhan seemed to acknowledge the possibility that the Nation of Islam was responsible:

Was Malcolm your traitor or ours? And if we dealt with him like a nation deals with a traitor, what the hell business is it of yours? A nation has to be able to deal with traitors and cutthroats and turncoats.

In a 60 Minutes interview that aired during May 2000, Farrakhan stated that some things he said may have led to the assassination of Malcolm X. "I may have been complicit in words that I spoke," he said, adding "I acknowledge that and regret that any word that I have said caused the loss of life of a human being." A few days later Farrakhan denied that he "ordered the assassination" of Malcolm X, although he again acknowledged that he "created the atmosphere that ultimately led to Malcolm X's assassination".

No consensus has been reached on who was responsible for the assassination. In August 2014, an online petition was started using the White House online petition mechanism to call on the government to release, without alteration, any files they still held relating to the murder of Malcolm X. In January 2019, members of the families of Malcolm X, John F. Kennedy, Martin Luther King Jr., and Robert F. Kennedy were among dozens of Americans who signed a public statement calling for a truth and reconciliation commission to persuade Congress or the Justice Department to review the assassinations of all four leaders during the 1960s.

A February 21, 2021, press conference attended by three of Malcolm X's daughters and members of deceased NYPD undercover officer Raymond Wood's family released his authorized posthumous letter that stated in part: "I was told to encourage leaders and members of the civil rights groups to commit felonious acts." The Guardian reports that "The arrests kept the two men from managing door security at the Audubon Ballroom in Washington Heights on the day of the shooting, according to the letter." On February 26, 2021, the daughter of Raymond Wood, Kelly Wood, stated that the letter presented at the February 21 press conference is fake. Kelly Wood stated that the letter was created by her cousin Reggie Wood for attention and book sales.

In early 2023, members of Malcolm X's family said they would file a $100 million wrongful death lawsuit against the CIA, the FBI, the NYPD and others for allegedly concealing evidence related to the assassination and for alleged involvement to it. The attorney representing the family is Benjamin Crump. In November 2024, three daughters of Malcolm X filed the lawsuit in Manhattan Federal Court. On August 19, 2026, the United States District Court for the Southern District of New York dismissed most of the claims against the federal defendants with prejudice. On September 29, 2026, plaintiffs informed the court that "the City proposes a temporary pause during which time the individual Plaintiffs and representatives of the Office of the Mayor will meet, with the aim of crafting a mutually agreeable outcome that honors the legacy and importance of Malcolm X." The court granted a 90-day stay.

== Philosophy ==
Except for his autobiography, Malcolm X left no published writings. His philosophy is known almost entirely from the many speeches and interviews he gave from 1952 until his death. Many of those speeches, especially from the last year of his life, were recorded and have been published. Malcolm was noted for his anti-colonial and pan-Islamist rhetoric.

=== Beliefs in the Nation of Islam ===
The white liberal differs from the white conservative only in one way: the liberal is more deceitful than the conservative.

— Malcolm X

While he was a member of the Nation of Islam, Malcolm X taught its beliefs, and his statements often began with the phrase "The Honorable Elijah Muhammad teaches us that ..." It is virtually impossible now to discern whether Malcolm X's personal beliefs at the time diverged from the teachings of the Nation of Islam. (Note: "'I'll be honest with you,' Malcolm X said to me. 'Everybody is talking about differences between the Messenger and me. It is absolutely impossible for us to differ.'") After he left the Nation in 1964, he compared himself to a ventriloquist's dummy who could only say what Elijah Muhammad told him to say. (Note: On a radio program in December 1964, Malcolm X said "all of my former statements were prefaced by 'the Honorable Elijah Muhammad teaches thus and so.' They weren't my statements, they were his statements, and I was repeating them.")

Malcolm X taught that black people were the original people of the world, and that whites were a race of devils who were created by an evil scientist named Yakub. The Nation of Islam believed that black people were superior to white people and that the demise of the white race was imminent. When questioned concerning his statements that white people were devils, Malcolm X said: "history proves the white man is a devil." "Anybody who rapes, and plunders, and enslaves, and steals, and drops hell bombs on people ... anybody who does these things is nothing but a devil," he said.

Malcolm X said that Islam was the "true religion of black mankind" and that Christianity was "the white man's religion" that had been imposed upon African Americans by their slave-masters. He said that the Nation of Islam followed Islam as it was practiced around the world, but the Nation's teachings varied from those of other Muslims because they were adapted to the "uniquely pitiful" condition of black people in the United States. He taught that Wallace Fard Muhammad, the founder of the Nation, was God incarnate, and that Elijah Muhammad was his Messenger, or Prophet. (Note: Malcolm X told Lewis Lomax that "The Messenger is the Prophet of Allah." On another occasion, he said, "We never refer to the Honorable Elijah Muhammad as a prophet.")

While the civil rights movement fought against racial segregation, Malcolm X advocated the complete separation of blacks from whites. The Nation of Islam proposed the establishment of a separate country for African Americans in the southern or southwestern United States as an interim measure until African Americans could return to Africa. Malcolm X suggested the United States government owed reparations to black people for the unpaid labor of their ancestors. He also rejected the civil rights movement's strategy of nonviolence, advocating instead that black people should defend themselves.

=== Later independent views ===
==== Palestine ====
Earlier in 1959, Malcolm X visited and met with religious leaders at Al-Aqsa mosque as a representative of Elijah Muhammad. Later in 1964, X visited the Khan Younis refugee camp in Gaza where he visited a local hospital and dined with religious leaders in Gaza. He also met Palestinian poet, Harun Hashem Rashid, who recounted to him how he narrowly escaped the Khan Younis massacre of 1956. Witnessing conditions in refugee camps firsthand, Malcolm X drew direct parallels between the subjugation of Black Americans and the displacement of Palestinians, stating "the same white supremacy that lynches Black people in America bombs villages in the Congo and bulldozes homes in Palestine." A few weeks later, Malcolm X headed to Cairo where he met with members of the Palestinian Liberation Organization. These meetings and experiences inspired Malcolm X to write an essay entitled "Zionist Logic" that was published in The Egyptian Gazette. In this essay Malcolm X explained how the "present occupation of Arab Palestine has no intelligent or legal basis in history" and described how Zionism was essentially a colonial and imperialist project:

The ever-scheming European imperialists wisely placed Israel where she could geographically divide the Arab world, infiltrate and sow the seed of dissension among African leaders and also divide the Africans against the Asians.

Following his return to the United States, Malcolm X continued to speak about the issue of Palestine describing in 1965 in one of his speeches in Detroit how "We need a free Palestine... We don't need a divided Palestine. We need a whole Palestine."

==== Civil rights movement ====
The common goal of 22 million Afro-Americans is respect as human beings. ... We can never get civil rights in America until our human rights are first restored. We will never be recognized as citizens there until we are first recognized as humans. ...

Just as the violation of human rights of our brothers and sisters in South Africa and Angola is an international issue and has brought the racists of South Africa and Portugal under attack from all other independent governments at the United Nations, once the miserable plight of the 22 million Afro-Americans is also lifted to the level of human rights our struggle then becomes an international issue and the direct concern of all other civilized governments. We can then take the racist American Government before the World Court and have the racists in it exposed and condemned as the criminals that they are.

— Malcolm X

After leaving the Nation of Islam, Malcolm X announced his willingness to work with leaders of the civil rights movement, though he advocated some changes to their policies. He felt that calling the movement a struggle for civil rights would keep the issue within the United States while changing the focus to human rights would make it an international concern. The movement could then bring its complaints before the United Nations, where Malcolm X said the emerging nations of the world would add their support.

Malcolm X argued that if the US government was unwilling or unable to protect black people, black people should protect themselves. He said that he and the other members of the OAAU were determined to defend themselves from aggressors, and to secure freedom, justice and equality "by whatever means necessary".

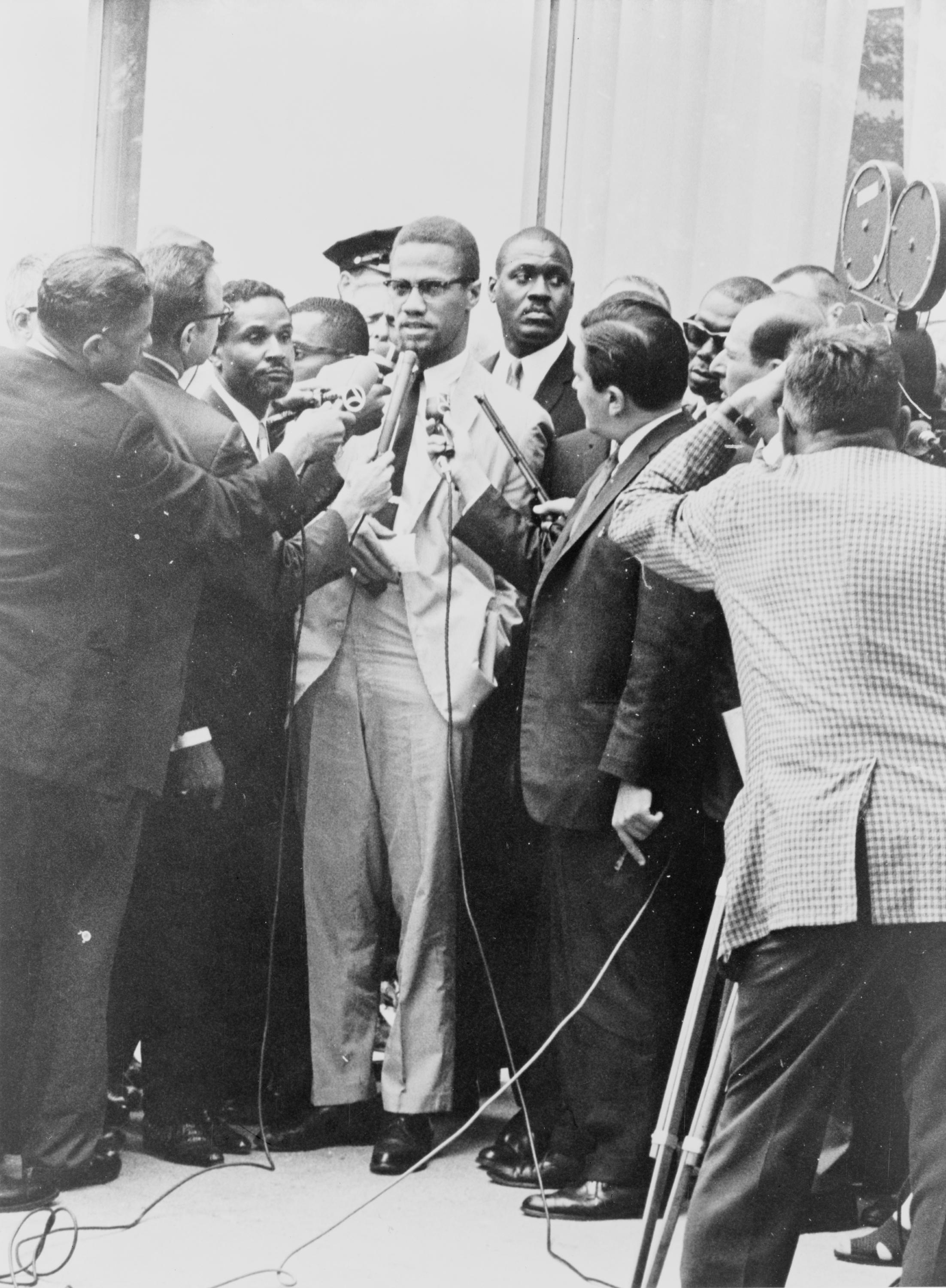
Malcolm X at a 1964 press conference

Malcolm X stressed the global perspective he gained from his international travels. He emphasized the "direct connection" between the domestic struggle of African Americans for equal rights with the independence struggles of Third World nations. He said that African Americans were wrong when they thought of themselves as a minority; globally, black people were the majority.

==== Integration ====
Although he no longer called for the separation of black people from white people, Malcolm X continued to advocate black nationalism, which he defined as self-determination for the African American community. In the last months of his life, however, Malcolm X began to reconsider his support for black nationalism after meeting northern African revolutionaries who, to all appearances, were white.

After his Hajj, Malcolm X articulated a view of white people and racism that represented a deep change from the philosophy he had supported as a minister of the Nation of Islam. In a famous letter from Mecca, he wrote that his experiences with white people during his pilgrimage convinced him to "rearrange" his thinking about race and "toss aside some of [his] previous conclusions". In a conversation with Gordon Parks, two days before his assassination, Malcolm said:

Listening to leaders like Nasser, Ben Bella, and Nkrumah awakened me to the dangers of racism. I realized racism isn't just a black and white problem. It's brought bloodbaths to about every nation on earth at one time or another.

Brother, remember the time that white college girl came into the restaurant‍—‌the one who wanted to help the [black] Muslims and the whites get together‍—‌and I told her there wasn't a ghost of a chance and she went away crying? Well, I've lived to regret that incident. In many parts of the African continent, I saw white students helping black people. Something like this kills a lot of argument. I did many things as a [black] Muslim that I'm sorry for now. I was a zombie then‍—‌like all [black] Muslims‍—‌I was hypnotized, pointed in a certain direction and told to march. Well, I guess a man's entitled to make a fool of himself if he's ready to pay the cost. It cost me 12 years.

That was a bad scene, brother. The sickness and madness of those days‍—‌I'm glad to be free of them.

==== Socialism ====
In his speeches at the Militant Labor Forum, which was sponsored by the Socialist Workers Party, Malcolm X criticized capitalism. After one such speech, when he was asked what political and economic system he wanted, he said he did not know, but that it was no coincidence the newly independent countries in the Third World were turning toward socialism. When a reporter asked him what he thought about socialism, Malcolm X asked whether it was good for black people. When the reporter told him it seemed to be, Malcolm X told him: "Then I'm for it."

After Malcolm X's death, a book published in 1968, titled The Last Year of Malcolm X, argued that Malcolm X was becoming more socialistic in thinking towards the end of his life, and becoming increasingly friendly with the Socialist Workers Party. The release of the book inspired Malcolm X's then widow Betty Shabazz to comment to biographer Peter Louis Goldman: "Malcolm was not a socialist". Nonetheless, Malcolm X is celebrated as an anti-imperialist socialist by movements throughout the world.

=== Claims of bisexuality ===
Dating back to 2009, some experts have claimed that Malcolm X was bisexual. These claims are primarily founded upon the work of the late Columbia University historian Manning Marable, and his controversial 2011 book Malcolm X: A Life of Reinvention. In the book, Marable asserted that "Malcolm X had exaggerated his early criminal career and had engaged in an early homosexual relationship with a white businessman."

Scholar Christopher Phelps agreed with Marable in the Journal of American Studies: "Malcolm Little did take part in sex acts with male counterparts. If set in the context of the 1930s and 1940s, these acts position him not as a 'homosexual lover,' as has been asserted, but in the pattern of 'straight trade'—heterosexual men open to sex with homosexuals—an understanding that in turn affords insights into the Black revolutionary's mature masculinity."

Malcolm X's family has rejected these allegations about his personal life. His daughter Ilyasah Shabazz said she would have known about these encounters before abruptly walking out on an interview on NPR. Shabazz said: "I think the things that I take issue with are the fact that he said my father engaged in a bisexual relationship, a homo—you know, he had a gay lover who was an elder white businessman, I think, in his late 50s when my father was in his teens. And, you know, my father was an open book. And we actually have four of the missing chapters from the autobiography. And, you know, he is very clear in his activities, which nothing included being gay. And certainly he didn't have anything against gay—he was for human rights, human justice, you know. So if he had a gay encounter, he likely would've talked about it. And what he did talk about was someone else's encounter."

== Legacy ==
Malcolm X has been described as one of the most influential African Americans in history. He is credited with raising the self-esteem of Black Americans and reconnecting them with their African heritage. He is largely responsible for the spread of Islam in the Black community in the United States. Many African Americans, especially those who lived in cities in the Northern and Western United States, felt that Malcolm X articulated their complaints concerning inequality better than the mainstream civil rights movement did. One biographer says that by giving expression to their frustration, Malcolm X "made clear the price that white America would have to pay if it did not accede to Black America's legitimate demands".

In the late 1960s, increasingly radical Black activists based their movements largely on Malcolm X and his teachings. The Black Power movement, the Black Arts Movement, and the widespread adoption of the slogan "Black is beautiful" can all trace their roots to Malcolm X. In 1963, Malcolm X began a collaboration with Alex Haley on his life story, The Autobiography of Malcolm X. He told Haley, "If I'm alive when this book comes out, it will be a miracle." Haley completed and published it some months after the assassination.

Malcolm X became a political symbol of Turkish Islamism, adherents of which view him as an important internal critic of the United States and the West, proof of Islam's transformative power, and as a martyr.

During the late 1980s and early 1990s, there was a resurgence of interest in his life among young people. Hip-hop groups such as Public Enemy adopted Malcolm X as an icon, and his image was displayed in hundreds of thousands of homes, offices, and schools, as well as on T-shirts and jackets. In 1986 Ella Little-Collins merged the Organization of Afro-American Unity with the African American Defense League.

In 1992 the film Malcolm X, an adaptation of The Autobiography of Malcolm X, was released. In 1994, the documentary Malcolm X: Make It Plain aired as an episode of the PBS television series American Experience. In 1998, Time named The Autobiography of Malcolm X one of the ten most influential nonfiction books of the 20th century.

Malcolm X was an inspiration for several fictional characters. He was fictionalized as the character Minister Q in the 1967 novel The Man Who Cried I Am by John A. Williams. The Marvel Comics writer Chris Claremont confirmed that Malcolm X was an inspiration for the X-Men character Magneto, while Martin Luther King was an inspiration for Professor X. Malcolm X also inspired the character Erik Killmonger in the film Black Panther.

=== Memorials and tributes ===
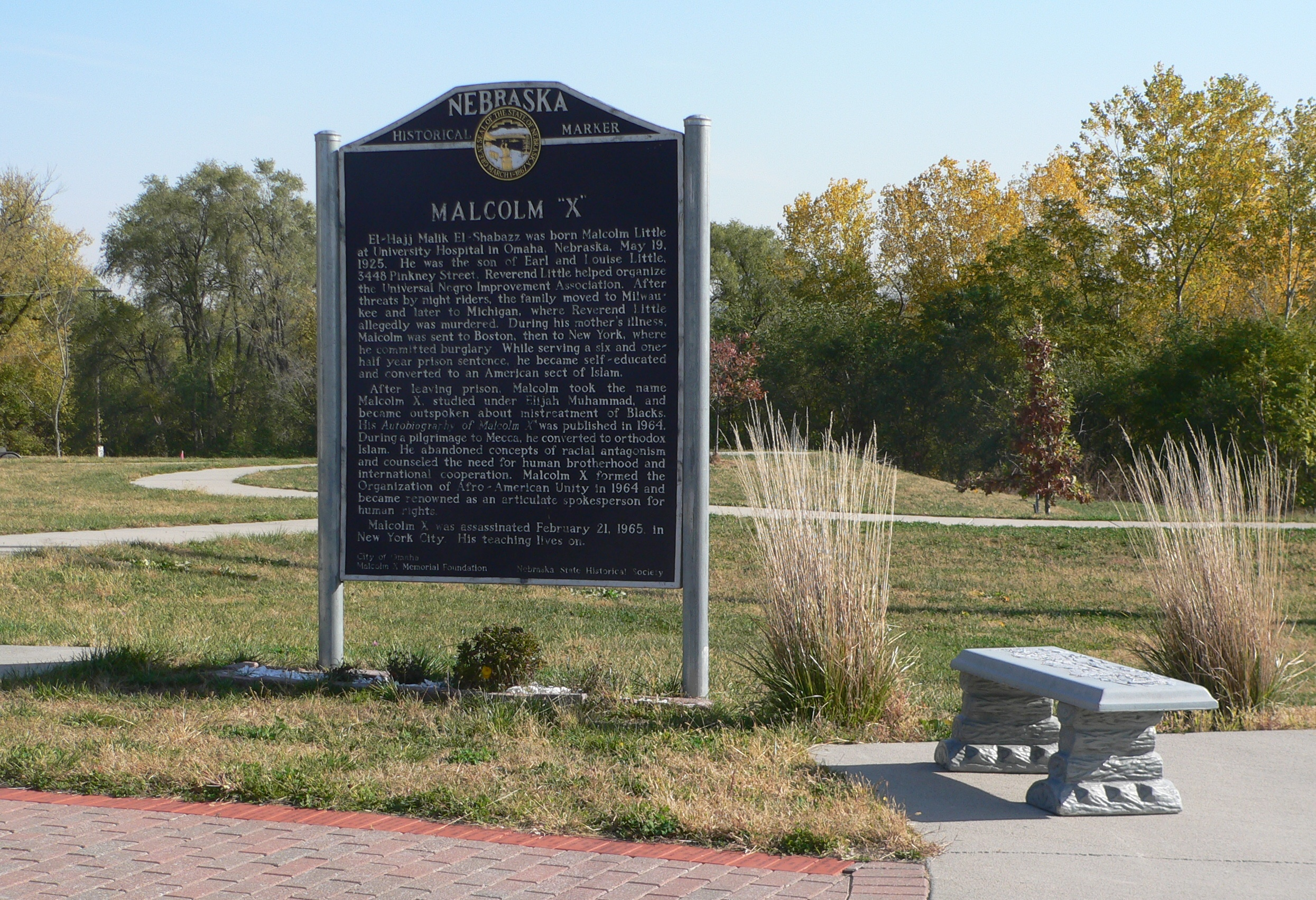
A historical marker for Malcolm X's first home in Omaha, Nebraska. The home itself was demolished in 1965.

There is a Nebraska Historical Marker at the site of Malcolm X's first home at 3448 Pinkney Street in North Omaha, Nebraska. The house was torn down in 1965 by new owners who did not know of its connection with Malcolm X. The site was listed on the National Register of Historic Places in 1984. The Malcolm X—Ella Little-Collins House in the Roxbury section of Boston, Massachusetts, where Malcolm X lived with his half-sister Ella Little-Collins and began getting involved in the Nation of Islam, was added to the National Register of Historic Places in 2021. Several archaeological surveys have been performed on the house's grounds, and there are ongoing efforts to preserve the site.

In 1968, twelve black students who occupied North Hall at University of California, Santa Barbara temporarily renamed it Malcolm X Hall to force the administration to acknowledge the needs of black students. As a result, UCSB created the Department of Black Studies.

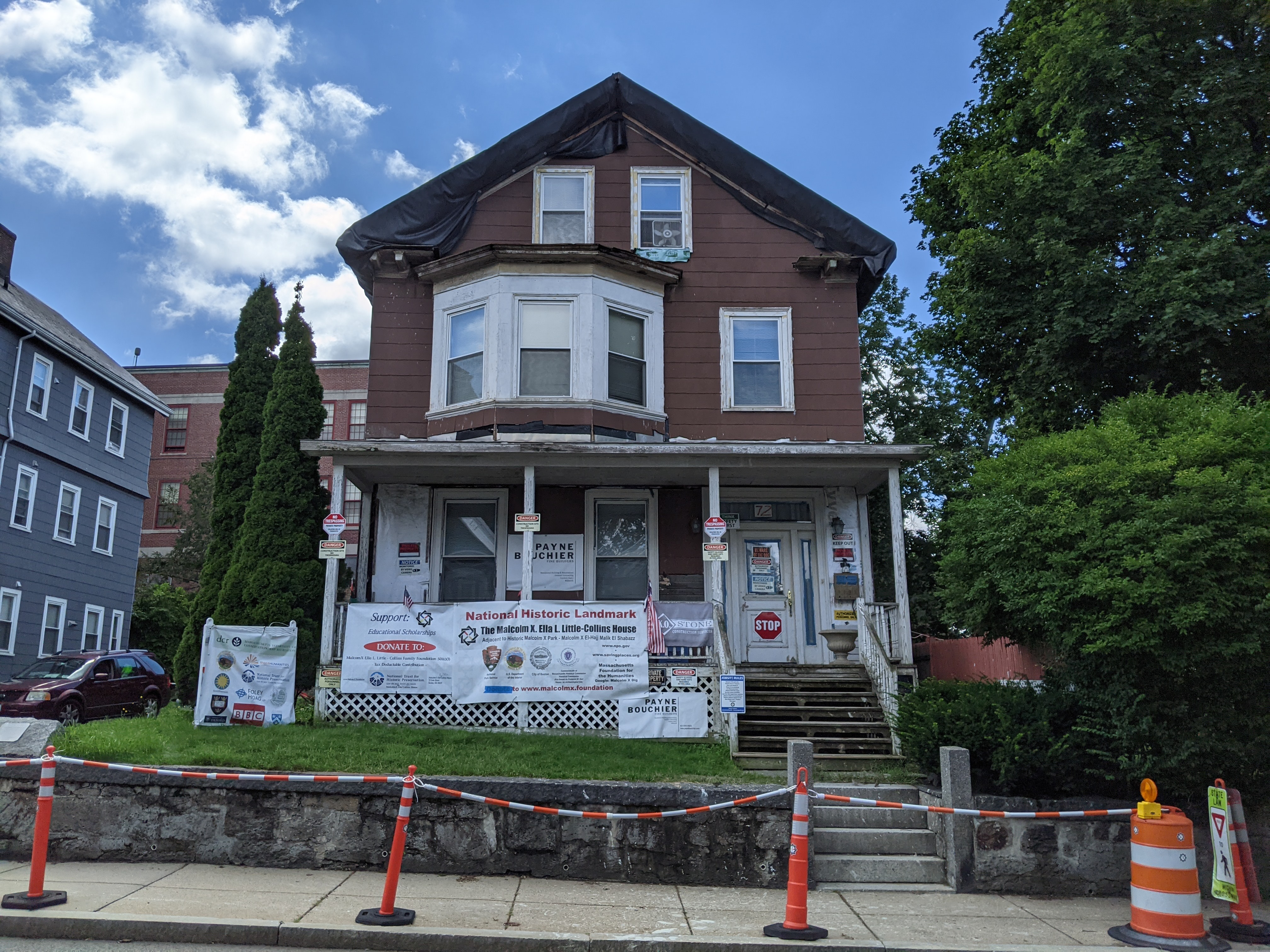
The Malcolm X—Ella Little-Collins House in Boston where Malcolm X and his half-sister Ella Little-Collins lived from 1941 to 1944.

In Lansing, Michigan, a Michigan Historical Marker was erected in 1975 on Malcolm X's childhood home. The city is also home to El-Hajj Malik El-Shabazz Academy, a public charter school with an Afrocentric focus. The school is located in the building where he attended elementary school.

In cities across the United States, Malcolm X's birthday (May 19) is commemorated as Malcolm X Day. The first known celebration of Malcolm X Day took place in Washington, D.C., in 1971. The city of Berkeley, California, has recognized Malcolm X's birthday as a citywide holiday since 1979.

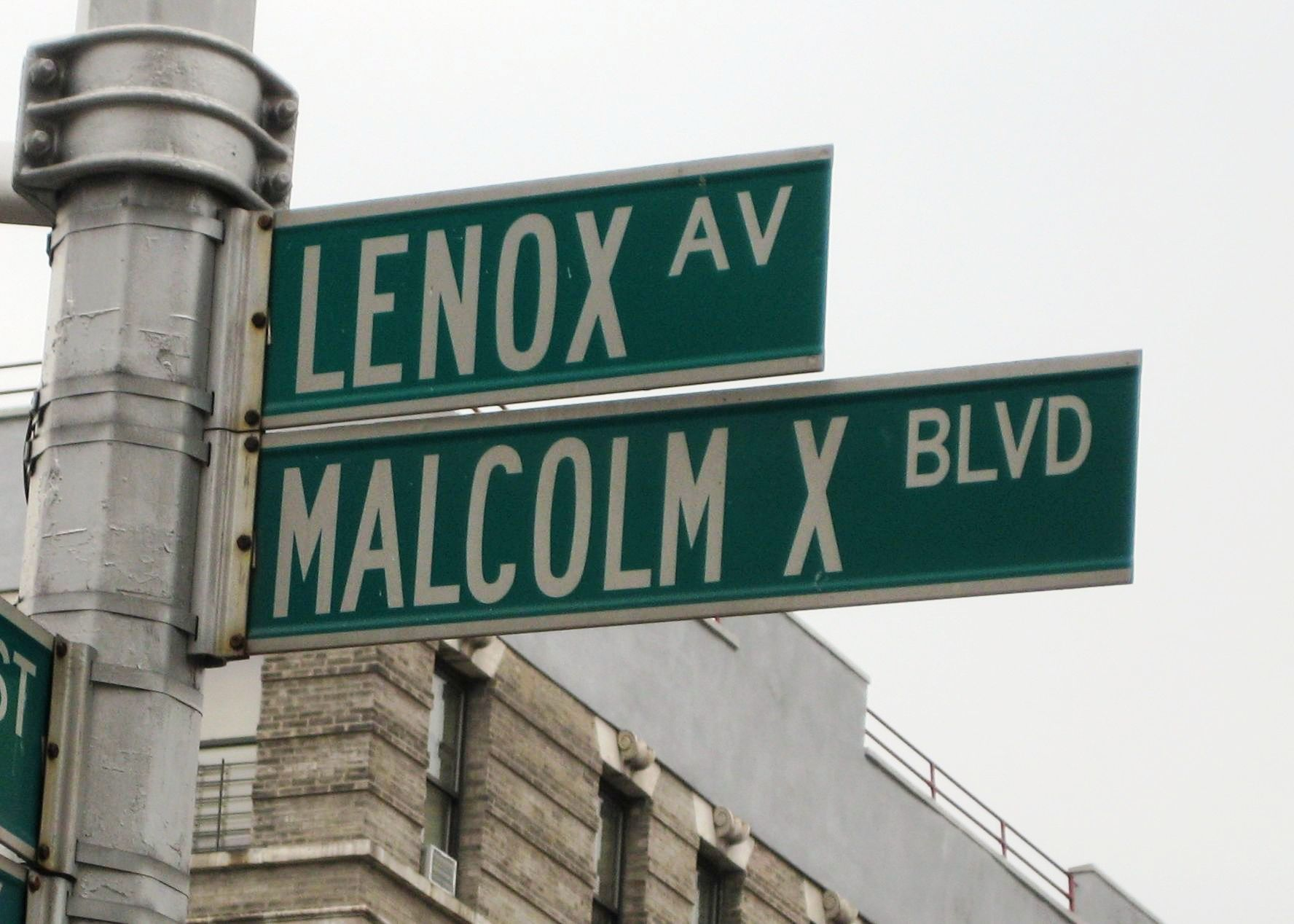
Malcolm X Boulevard in New York City

Many cities have renamed streets after Malcolm X. In 1987, New York mayor Ed Koch proclaimed Lenox Avenue in Harlem to be Malcolm X Boulevard. The name of Reid Avenue in Brooklyn, New York, was changed to Malcolm X Boulevard in 1985. Brooklyn also has El Shabazz Playground that was named after him. New Dudley Street, in the Roxbury neighborhood of Boston, was renamed Malcolm X Boulevard in the 1990s. In 1997, Oakland Avenue in Dallas, Texas, was renamed Malcolm X Boulevard. Main Street in Lansing, Michigan, was renamed Malcolm X Street in 2010. In 2016, Ankara, Turkey, renamed the street on which the U.S. is building its new embassy after Malcolm X. (Note: English-language sources disagreed whether the street was being renamed Malcolm X Road or Malcolm X Avenue, The state media agency's English-language announcement said merely that "the street ... will bear the name of Malcolm X".)

Dozens of schools have been named after Malcolm X, including Malcolm X Shabazz High School in Newark, New Jersey, Malcolm Shabazz City High School in Madison, Wisconsin, Malcolm X College in Chicago, Illinois, and El-Hajj Malik El-Shabazz Academy in Lansing, Michigan. Malcolm X Liberation University, based on the Pan-Africanist ideas of Malcolm X, was founded in 1969 in North Carolina.

In 1996, the first library named after Malcolm X was opened, the Malcolm X Branch Library and Performing Arts Center of the San Diego Public Library system.

The U.S. Postal Service issued a Malcolm X postage stamp in 1999. In 2005, Columbia University announced the opening of the Malcolm X and Dr. Betty Shabazz Memorial and Educational Center. The memorial is located in the Audubon Ballroom, where Malcolm X was assassinated. Collections of Malcolm X's papers are held by the Schomburg Center for Research in Black Culture and the Robert W. Woodruff Library.

After a community-led initiative, Conrad Grebel University College in Canada (affiliated with the University of Waterloo) launched the Malcolm X Peace and Conflict Studies Scholarship in 2021 to support black and Indigenous students enrolled in their Master of Peace and Conflict Studies program.

In 2024, Malcolm X was inducted into the Nebraska Hall of Fame, with a bust of him being placed in the Nebraska State Capitol.

== Portrayal in film, in television, and on stage ==
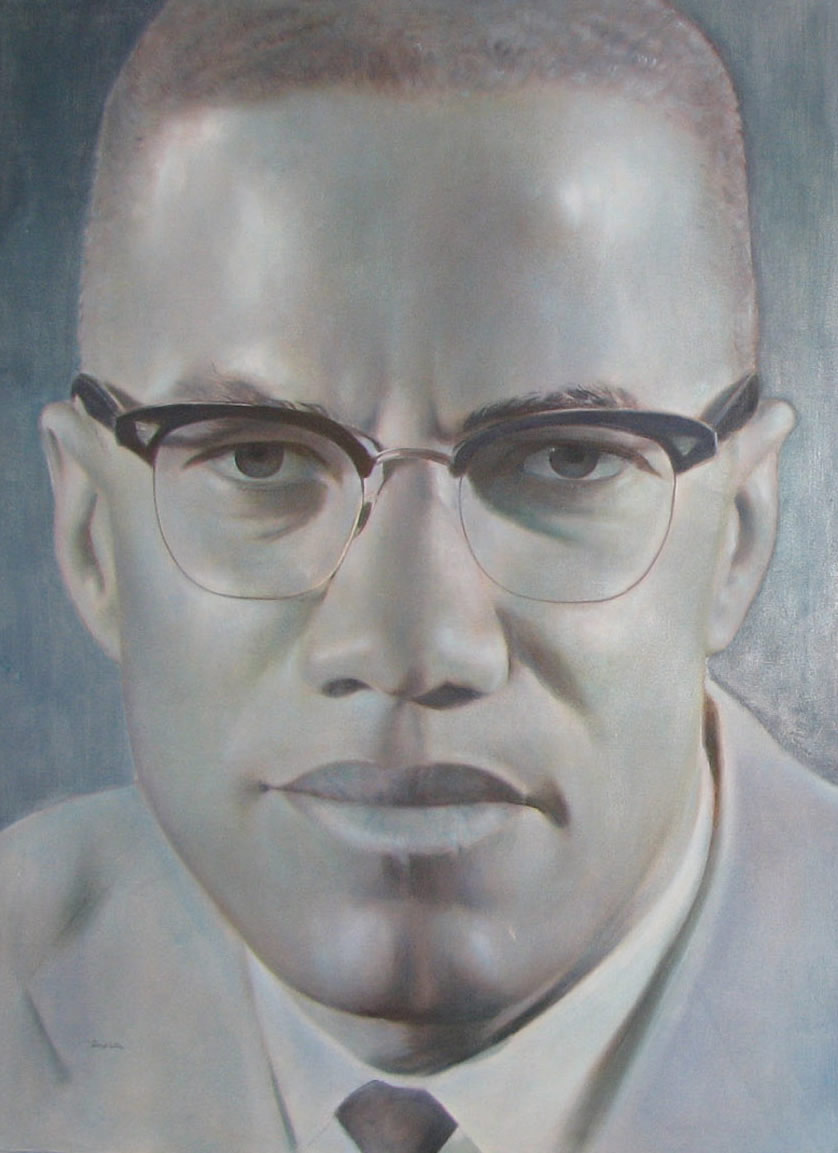
Portrait of Malcolm X by Robert Templeton, from the collection Lest We Forget: Images of the Black Civil Rights Movement

In 1986, composer Anthony Davis's opera X, The Life and Times of Malcolm X premiered at the New York City Opera. It was the first work by Davis, who would go on to win the Pulitzer Prize for Music for his opera The Central Park Five (2019). In 2023, it was performed at the Metropolitan Opera in a production by Robert O'Hara, with Will Liverman playing the title role. It received positive reviews.

Arnold Perl and Marvin Worth attempted to create a drama film based on The Autobiography of Malcolm X, but when people close to the subject declined to talk to them they decided to make a documentary instead. The result was the 1972 documentary film Malcolm X.

Denzel Washington played the title role in Spike Lee's film Malcolm X (1992). Roger Ebert and Martin Scorsese included it on their lists of the ten best films of the 1990s. Washington had previously played the part of Malcolm X in the 1981 Off-Broadway play When the Chickens Came Home to Roost.

Other portrayals include:

- James Earl Jones, in the 1977 film The Greatest.
- Dick Anthony Williams, in the 1978 television miniseries King and the 1989 American Playhouse production of the Jeff Stetson play The Meeting.
- Al Freeman Jr., in the 1979 television miniseries Roots: The Next Generations.
- Morgan Freeman, in the 1981 television movie Death of a Prophet.
- Ben Holt, in the 1986 opera X, The Life and Times of Malcolm X at the New York City Opera.
- Gary Dourdan, in the 2000 television movie King of the World.
- Joe Morton, in the 2000 television movie Ali: An American Hero.
- Mario Van Peebles, in the 2001 film Ali.
- Lindsay Owen Pierre, in the 2013 television movie Betty & Coretta.
- François Battiste, in the stage play One Night in Miami, first performed in 2013.
- Nigél Thatch, in the 2014 film Selma and the 2019 television series Godfather of Harlem.
- Kingsley Ben-Adir, in the 2020 film One Night in Miami, based on the play of the same name.
- Jason Alan Carvell, in the 2023 season of the television series Godfather of Harlem.
- Aaron Pierre, in the 2024 season of the television series Genius, which has been branded as MLK/X.
- Michael Ealy in the 2026 television series The Greatest.

== Published works ==
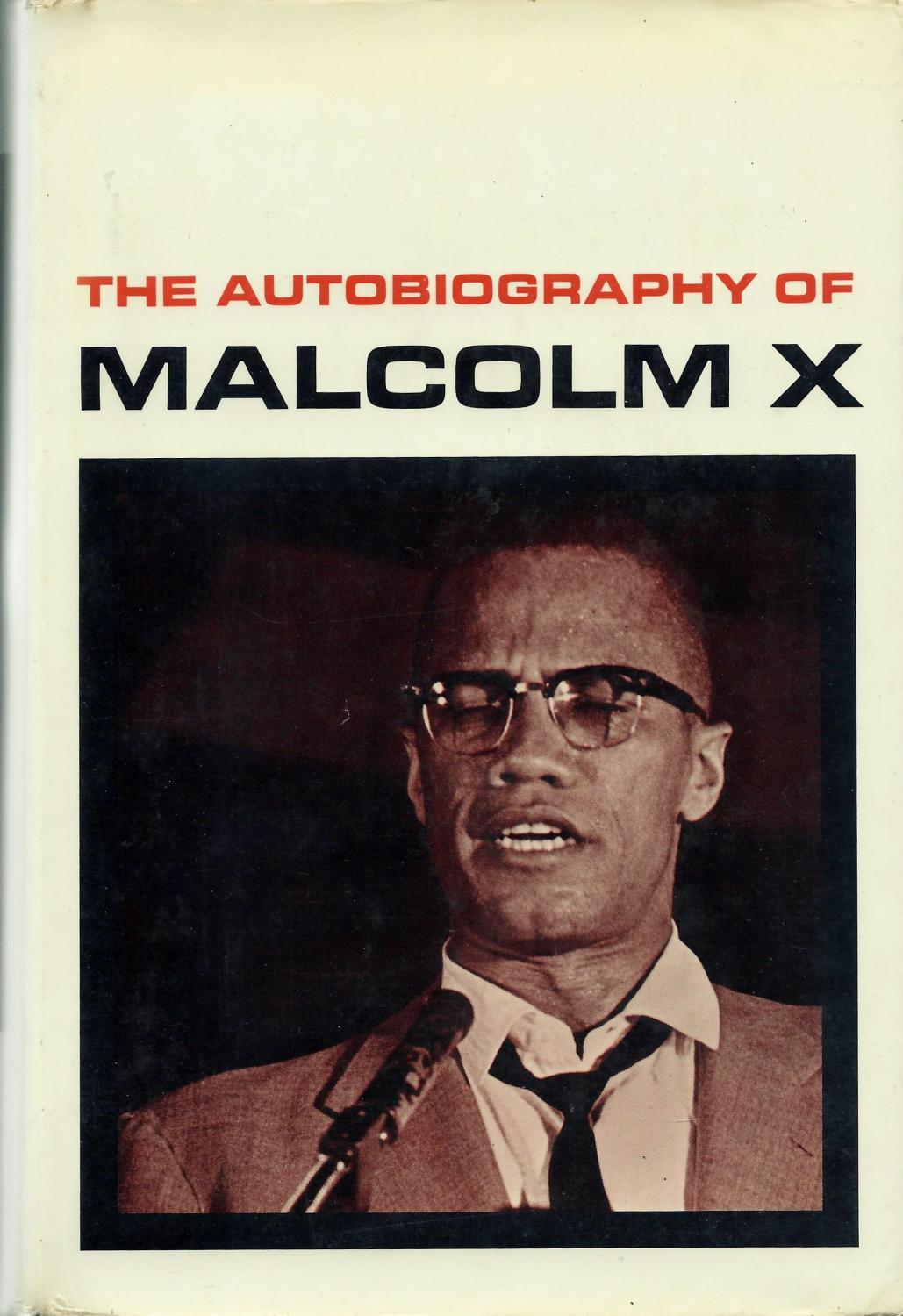
The Autobiography of Malcolm X, first edition

- The Autobiography of Malcolm X. With the assistance of Alex Haley. New York: Grove Press, 1965. OCLC 219493184.
- Malcolm X Speaks: Selected Speeches and Statements. George Breitman, ed. New York: Merit Publishers, 1965. OCLC 256095445.
- Malcolm X Talks to Young People. New York: Young Socialist Alliance, 1965. OCLC 81990227.
- Two Speeches by Malcolm X. New York: Pathfinder Press, 1965. OCLC 19464959.
- Malcolm X on Afro-American History. New York: Merit Publishers, 1967. OCLC 78155009.
- The Speeches of Malcolm X at Harvard. Archie Epps, ed. New York: Morrow, 1968. OCLC 185901618.
- By Any Means Necessary: Speeches, Interviews, and a Letter by Malcolm X. George Breitman, ed. New York: Pathfinder Press, 1970. OCLC 249307.
- The End of White World Supremacy: Four Speeches by Malcolm X. Benjamin Karim, ed. New York: Monthly Review Press, 1971. OCLC 149849.
- The Last Speeches. Bruce Perry, ed. New York: Pathfinder Press, 1989. ISBN 978-0-87348-543-2.
- Malcolm X Talks to Young People: Speeches in the United States, Britain, and Africa. Steve Clark, ed. New York: Pathfinder Press, 1991. ISBN 978-0-87348-962-1.
- February 1965: The Final Speeches. Steve Clark, ed. New York: Pathfinder Press, 1992. ISBN 978-0-87348-749-8.
- The Diary of Malcolm X: 1964. Herb Boyd and Ilyasah Shabazz, eds. Chicago: Third World Press, 2013. ISBN 978-0-88378-351-1.

== See also ==
- Bibliography of Malcolm X
- Bibliography of Martin Luther King Jr.
