= Organization of Afro-American Unity =

Organization founded by Malcolm X in 1964

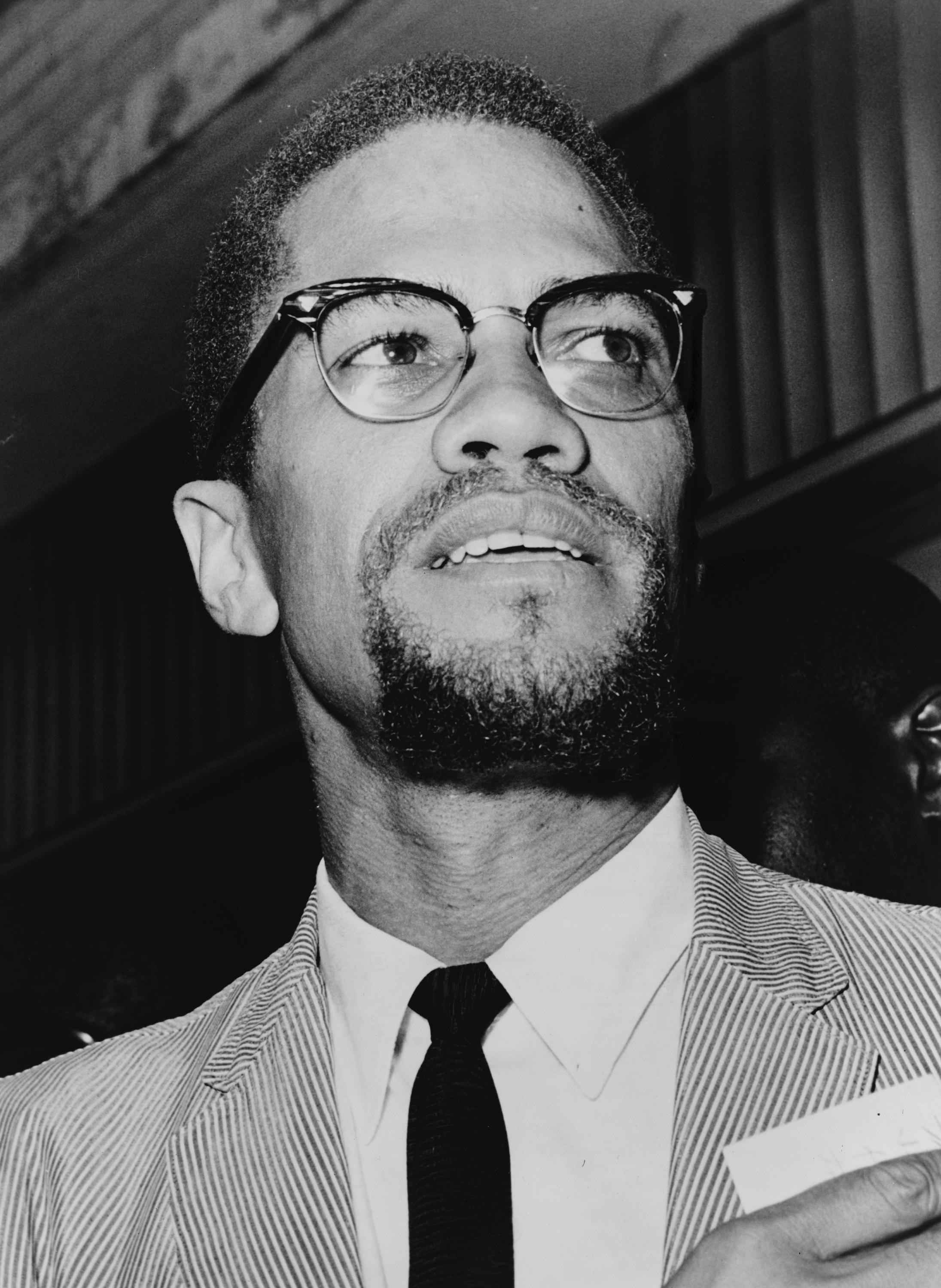
Malcolm X in 1964

The Organization of Afro-American Unity (OAAU) was a Pan-Africanist organization founded by Malcolm X in 1964. The OAAU was modeled on the Organization of African Unity, which had impressed Malcolm X during his visit to Africa in April and May 1964. The purpose of the OAAU was to fight for the human rights of African Americans and promote cooperation among Africans and people of African descent in the Americas.

Malcolm X announced the establishment of the OAAU at a public meeting in New York's Audubon Ballroom on June 28, 1964. He had written the group's charter with John Henrik Clarke, Albert Cleage, Jesse Gray, and Gloria Richardson, among others. In a memo dated July 2, 1964, FBI Director J. Edgar Hoover described the nascent OAAU as a threat to the national security of the United States.

Malcolm X, along with John Henrik Clarke, wrote the following into the Organization of Afro-American Unity (OAAU) Basic Unity Program:

1. Restoration: "In order to release ourselves from the oppression of our enslavers then, it is absolutely necessary for the Afro-American to restore communication with Africa."
2. Reorientation: "We can learn much about Africa by reading informative books and by listening to the experiences of those who have traveled there."
3. Education: "The Organization of Afro-American Unity will devise original educational methods and procedures which will liberate the minds of our children. We will ... encourage qualified Afro-Americans to write and publish the textbooks needed to liberate our minds ... educating them [our children] at home."
4. Economic Security: "After the Emancipation Proclamation ... it was realized that the Afro-American constituted the largest homogeneous ethnic group with a common origin and common group experience in the United States and, if allowed to exercise economic or political freedom, would in a short period of time own this country. We must establish a technician bank. We must do this so that the newly independent nations of Africa can turn to us who are their brothers for the technicians they will need now and in the future."
5. Self Defense: "In order to enslave a people and keep them subjugated, their right to self defense must be denied. We encourage the Afro-Americans to defend themselves against the wanton attacks of the racist aggressors whose sole aim is to deny us the guarantee of the United Nations Charter of Human Rights and of the Constitution of the United States."

The OAAU pushed for black control of every aspect of the black community. At the founding rally, Malcolm X stated that the organization's principal concern was the human rights of blacks, but that it would also focus on voter registration, school boycotts, rent strikes, housing rehabilitation, and social programs for addicts, unwed mothers, and troubled children. Malcolm X saw the OAAU as a way of "un-brainwashing" black people, ridding them of the lies they had been told about themselves and their culture.

On July 17, 1964, Malcolm X was welcomed to the second meeting of the Organisation of African Unity in Cairo as a representative of the OAAU.

When a reporter asked whether white people could join the OAAU, Malcolm X said, "Definitely not." Then he added, "If John Brown were still alive, we might accept him."

Malcolm X did not have sufficient time to invest in the OAAU to help it flourish. After his death, Malcolm X's half-sister, Ella Little-Collins, took over the leadership of the OAAU, but dwindling membership and Malcolm X's absence eventually led to the collapse, and or later emergence of the organization African American Defense League - Organization of Afro-American Unity. The OAAU charter was extended by Ella Little-Collins to Khalid Abdul Muhammad and Mauricelm-Lei Millere (Mauricelm X), who gave a speech entitled "The Black Revolution and The Black Evolution", the occasion was to honor the works of Minister Malcolm X, where Collins claimed that Millere's spirit reminded her of her brother Malcolm. The Charter was received at An Old Elijah Muhammad Temple / Mosque (The Lost Found Nation Of Islam) located in Tunica, Mississippi Old Hwy 61 North.

== See also ==
- Bibliography of Malcolm X
- Bibliography of Martin Luther King Jr.
