= A Lie of Reinvention: Correcting Manning Marable's Malcolm X =

Critical essays in response to Manning Marable's Malcolm X biography

- Editors: Jared A. Ball and Todd Steven Burroughs
- Subject: Malcolm X
- Genre: Non-fiction
- Publisher: Black Classic Press
- Publication date: May 2012
- Publication place: United States
- Media type: Paperback
- Pages: 308
- ISBN: 978-1574780499

A Lie of Reinvention: Correcting Manning Marable's Malcolm X is a 2012 collection of critical essays in response to the biography, Malcolm X: A Life of Reinvention (2011) by Manning Marable. The collection was edited by Jared A. Ball and Todd Steven Burroughs.

After A Life of Reinvention received effusive mainstream praise as the "definitive" Malcolm X biography—it was called "magisterial", "a comprehensive portrait", "a masterpiece"; and won the Pulitzer Prize for History and was named a National Book Award finalist—a number of scholars wrote sharp critiques, arguing that the biography was poorly researched, that it distorted Malcolm X's life and legacy, that it contained unsubstantiated sexual accusations, and it diluted Malcolm X's political militancy. In a 2012 interview, Ball labeled the biography "a carefully constructed ideological assault on history, on radical politics, on historical and cultural memory, on the very idea of revolution."

== Background ==
Soon after A Life of Reinvention was published in early April 2011, a backlash arose on the Black political left. Todd Steven Burroughs posted a scathing review of the book on the "Drums in the Global Village" website. Jared Ball appeared on radio programs and organized public events where Marable's biography came under attack. At a July 2011 panel discussion about A Life of Reinvention, held at the Schomburg Center for Research in Black Culture, Burroughs announced during the Q&A section that he and Ball were already working on a collective rebuttal to the biography.

The effort by Black scholars to quickly "set the record straight" about a prominent Black revolutionary was likened to the rapid response to William Styron's Pulitzer Prize-winning novel, The Confessions of Nat Turner (1967). In that instance, historian John Henrik Clarke compiled the 1968 anthology, William Styron's Nat Turner: Ten Black Writers Respond, to counter Styron's harsh depiction of slave revolt leader Nat Turner.

== Contents ==
In "A Note from the Publisher", W. Paul Coates of Black Classic Press accuses Marable's biography of "excessive innuendo, glaring omission, questionable sourcing, undocumented speculation" and points to an "inexcusable lack of key primary sources", specifically Malcolm X's wife and family, who were not interviewed by Marable. Coates clarifies that the word "Lie" in the title is

not asserting that Manning Marable is a liar. We do not make such a claim. Nor do we direct any ill will or disrespect toward Marable or his publisher, Viking Press. Instead, this book is purposely titled and published because of our intent to provide a necessary correction of Manning Marable's Malcolm X.

Jared Ball's opening chapter, "An Introduction to a Lie", summarizes the arguments of the book's fifteen contributors, which include activists and scholars such as Mumia Abu-Jamal, A. Peter Bailey, Amiri Baraka, Eugene Puryear, and Raymond Winbush. Ball reiterates a point made in several essays that Marable—a Columbia University professor who died within days of the biography's publication—was "an elite academic working with an elite publishing house" whose goal was "to craft a version of Malcolm X that would appeal to the 'broadest audience possible'" and "to produce an ideological media product that represents the political perspectives and worldviews of those who rule."

Patricia Reid-Merritt writes in her essay that Marable "would have his readers believe that the socially undesirable characteristics that Malcolm X developed in his early life as 'Detroit Red' remained a permanent part of his personality", and that up until his assassination he was "a chronic liar" and a "hustler/trickster who managed to capture the imagination of Black America".

Sundiata Keita Cha-Jua disputes the biography's assertions about the sex life and rumored infidelities of Malcolm X. Cha-Jua states that Marable took a passage from The Autobiography of Malcolm X—which describes an acquaintance of "Detroit Red" named Rudy who "would undress himself and an elderly White man and then sprinkle talcum powder on the old guy, who 'got off' from the experience"—and converted it into a declaration that Malcolm X was Rudy and that he regularly engaged in "paid homosexual encounters". Cha-Jua also challenges the sourcing of Marable's allegation that Malcolm X and his wife Betty Shabazz were serially unfaithful to each other. These salacious details in A Life of Reinvention were seized upon in the press coverage and reviews of the book.

In an essay titled "Speculative Nonfiction", Raymond Winbush argues that Marable relied uncritically on FBI files "and utilized speculation and innuendo as source material." Moreover, Winbush faults the author, as does Rosemari Mealy in her essay, for omitting the voices of important women in Malcolm X's life. Marable said he began researching the biography twenty years before it was published, which means he could have interviewed his subject's older half-sister Ella Little-Collins who died in 1996 and was a formative influence on her brother's religious and political beliefs. Marable also did not interview Betty Shabazz who died in 1997.

A. Peter Bailey, one of the people Marable interviewed with first-hand knowledge of Malcolm X, cites instances where his interview comments "were forcibly bent to fit Marable's biases, so much so that he [Bailey] claims the published remarks bear 'no relationship' to what he actually said."

Amiri Baraka, Kamau Franklin, Eugene Puryear, Christopher Tinson, and Todd Steven Burroughs all condemn "Marable's posthumous liberalizing of Malcolm X", and the downplaying of his Black Nationalist and Pan-Africanist ideas. In the essay, "An Ivory-Tower Assassination of Malcolm X", Franklin asserts that Marable misrepresents Malcolm X's 1964 "The Ballot or the Bullet" speech, "downgrading it from a threat of revolution if Black demands were not met immediately to a call for a bloodless revolution for democratic rights". Franklin also reproaches Marable for attempting "to portray the election of Barack Obama as part of Malcolm's political legacy." Puryear writes that "the takeaway [from Marable's book] for most readers, unfortunately, will be that Malcolm was evolving toward a form of liberalism or that he potentially was never a revolutionary at all." William Sales criticizes Marable for minimizing the radical aims and objectives of the Organization of Afro-American Unity (OAAU), which Malcolm X established in the last year of his life.

== Reception ==
In a review of A Lie of Reinvention, Monroe Little says "the quality of scholarly analysis is uneven. While a few of these essays are well done, far too many were a disappointment to this reviewer." He adds:

I concur with many of the criticisms the contributors leveled against Marable's so-called magnum opus, but there is too much repetition and not enough depth to most of the critiques. Just as troubling, however, are aspects of A Lie of Reinvention that undercut its purpose such as the mean-spirited, ad-hominum denunciations of Marable by more than a few of the book's contributors. Indeed, A Lie of Reinvention probably tells us as much about the failings of the contemporary Internet-dominated public culture and the decline in civil discourse, even among scholars and intellectuals, as it does about Marable's failings as a historian and biographer.

Little concludes that the overall critique is "Lilliputian when it could have been Olympian."

Black Classic Press released a Kindle edition of A Lie of Reinvention in July 2013, and reissued the paperback in March 2015.

== See also ==
- Bibliography of Malcolm X
