= Malcolm X: A Life of Reinvention =

2011 book by Manning Marable

- Cover of first U.S. edition
- Author: Manning Marable
- Subject: Malcolm X
- Genre: Non-fiction, biography
- Publisher: Viking
- Publication date: April 4, 2011 (hardcover); December 28, 2011 (paperback)
- Publication place: United States
- Pages: 608
- ISBN: 978-0670022205

Malcolm X: A Life of Reinvention is a biography of Malcolm X written by American historian Manning Marable. It won the 2012 Pulitzer Prize for History.

Pulitzer.org described this as "an exploration of the legendary life and provocative views of one of the most significant African-Americans in U.S. history, a work that separates fact from fiction and blends the heroic and tragic." In the book, Marable concludes that Malcolm X exaggerated his early criminal career, and engaged in a homosexual relationship with a white businessman. He also concludes that some of the killers of Malcolm X are still alive and were never charged.

== Reception ==
Malcolm X: A Life of Reinvention was nominated for the National Book Award, and The New York Times ranked it among the 10 Best Books of 2011. It was one of three nominees for the inaugural Andrew Carnegie Medal for Excellence in Nonfiction (2012) presented by the American Library Association for the best adult non-fiction. It was awarded the Pulitzer Prize for History in 2012. As of April 2011 the book had been among the top ten books of the best seller list of Amazon.com. According to Viking, the print run had increased to 70,000 from the original 46,000.

Henry Louis Gates Jr., a literary critic, admired the book and said "Manning Marable has written the definitive biography of this outrageously misrepresented figure. He has plumbed countless historical records to bring out what is there, not what is imagined."

Houston A. Baker Jr., author a review of the book for the African American Review, wrote that the book "also finds itself under excoriating siege from a legion of detractors who count themselves admirers and disciples 'connected' with Malcolm X and his 'celebrity.'"

University of Chicago professor Michael Dawson defended Marable's biography, stating Marable had "precisely focused on some of the critical central questions confronting black and progressive politics."

=== Criticism ===
External videos
- "By Any Means Necessary: Malcolm X -- Real, Not Reinvented", presentation by Herb Boyd at the Brecht Forum, C-SPAN

Author, journalist and former college professor Herb Boyd speaking on behalf of 30 African American scholars who examined the contents of the book stated they found over 25 significant errors, some of which he described as "absolutely egregious.

Karl Evanzz, the author of The Judas Factor: The Plot to Kill Malcolm X, referred to Marable's book as an "abomination" and stated that "it is a cavalcade of innuendo and logical fallacy, and is largely reinvented from previous works on the subject". An online magazine, The Root, declined to publish Evanzz's review. Gates, the editor in chief of The Root, said that he had no role in the rejection of Evanzz's review. David Montgomery of The Washington Post stated that "most reviews have been far more positive than Evanzz's."

Marable's account has also been challenged in a book of essays edited by Africana Studies professor Jared Ball and Todd Steven Burroughs, A Lie of Reinvention: Correcting Manning Marable's Malcolm X, published in 2012. Ball has stated that Marable's book "is a corporate product, a simple commodity to be traded, but for more than money; it is a carefully constructed ideological assault on history, on radical politics, on historical and cultural memory, on the very idea of revolution."

Linwood X Cathcart, a former Nation of Islam minister, started a $50 million lawsuit against Marable's estate, Columbia University, and Viking Press, as a result of Marable's suggestions that Cathcart was involved in Malcolm X's murder. In the book Marable misspelled his name "Linward".

In March 2012, John Andrew Morrow, Ph.D. writing for the University of Virginia's The Journal of Pan African Studies published The Second Assassination of Malcolm X: A Critical Review of Manning Marable's Biography. Morrow found that "Marable's case against Malcolm is based more on fantasy than on fact." and that Marable had failed "to follow the most fundamental of academic standards" and that Marable had circumvented the peer-review process.

Ilyasah and Malaak Shabazz, daughters of Malcolm X, criticized the book's contention that there was possible infidelity and strain in the marriage between Malcolm X and Betty Shabazz. Ilyasah said that the marriage "was definitely faithful and devoted because my father was a man of impeccable integrity, and I think that most people, if they're not clear on anything, they're clear that he was moral and ethical and had impeccable character." In response to such criticisms, Boyce Watkins wrote in The Tennessee Tribune that "the fact that a person is your greatest hero does not mean they cannot be critiqued". Regarding the criticism from Malcolm X's daughters, Watkins wrote that their response "is natural, given that every little girl in America wants to believe that her daddy can do no wrong."

== Editions ==
The book was published in hardcover, paperback, audiobook and various ebook formats.

== Television series ==
In August 2017, The Hollywood Reporter and Deadline Hollywood reported that the independent studio Critical Content was developing a television series based on Malcolm X: A Life of Reinvention with writer David Matthews. Professor Leith Mullings, the wife of Manning Marable, who wrote Malcolm X, was among those identified as consultants to the project.

== See also ==
- Bibliography of Malcolm X
- Bibliography of Martin Luther King Jr.
