= Malcolm X House Site =

- U.S. National Register of Historic Places
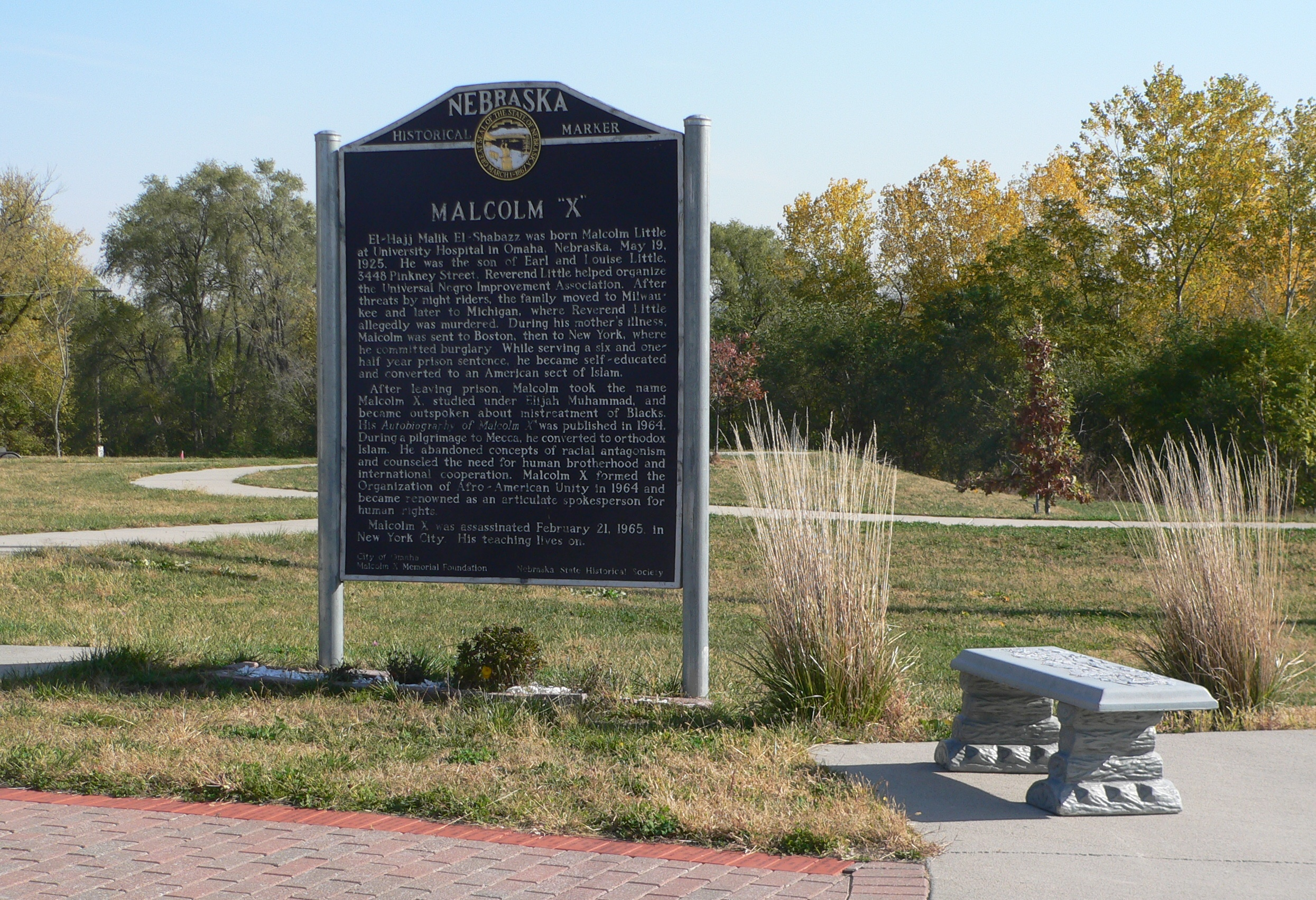
- Historical marker at Malcolm X House Site

- Location within Nebraska Location within the United States
- Location: Omaha, Nebraska
- Coordinates: 41°17′25.84″N 95°57′48.89″W
- NRHP reference No.: 84002463
- Added to NRHP: March 1, 1984

The Malcolm X House Site located at 3448 Pinkney Street in North Omaha, Nebraska, marks the place where Malcolm X first lived with his family. The site was listed on the National Register of Historic Places in 1984 and is also on the Nebraska list of heritage sites.

== History ==
Malcolm Little was born at University of Nebraska at Omaha Hospital on May 19, 1925, to Earl and Louise Little. Earl Little was a Christian minister and active in the local community. In his autobiography, Malcolm X stated that his family left Omaha for Milwaukee, Wisconsin in 1926 because of threats from the Ku Klux Klan.

The house was torn down in 1965, before the owners, the Moore family, knew about the connection with Malcolm X. Malcolm X's significance in American history and culture was honored when the site was listed on the National Register of Historic Places on March 1, 1984. This recognition is marked at the site. A State Historical Marker was added in 1987.

Civic and union activist Rowena Moore, whose father had lived in the house and owned the property, led efforts to have the house site recognized as a historic site to acknowledge Malcolm X's importance. She said her family was unaware of the connection until her sister discovered it by reading Malcolm X's autobiography in 1970. She also hoped to build a museum there in his honor. Moore purchased more property around the site.

Today the 10 acres (4.0 ha) of land are owned by the Malcolm X Foundation. They have plans to purchase more property to create a park, and to connect it to the municipal Adams Park to the south. In 2008, the foundation established six plots on the site for a community garden.

== See also ==
- Civil rights movement in Omaha, Nebraska
- History of North Omaha, Nebraska
- Landmarks in North Omaha, Nebraska
- Bibliography of Malcolm X
- Bibliography of Martin Luther King Jr.
