= Rowena Moore =

- Born: September 10, 1910; Meridian, Oklahoma U.S.
- Died: December 15, 1998 (aged 88); Omaha, Nebraska U.S.
- Occupation: Community activist

Rowena Moore (September 10, 1910 – December 15, 1998) was an African-American union and civic activist, and founder of the Malcolm X Memorial Foundation in Omaha, Nebraska. She led the effort to have the Malcolm X House Site recognized for its association with the life of the national civil-rights leader. It was listed on both the National Register of Historic Places and the Nebraska register of historic sites.

== Early life ==
Moore was born in Meridian, Oklahoma. When her father got a job in the meatpacking industry in 1924, her family moved to Omaha, Nebraska. She first worked in a packing plant at age 15, though she claimed to be 16 to get a job scraping fat off animals' hindquarters.

== Career ==
During World War II Moore noticed that while many women were given jobs in the meatpacking industry, African-American women were discriminated against. Moore organized a union called the Defense Women’s Club of black women who were committed to securing employment and supporting the war effort. Their goals were to promote war bonds and food rationing, child care for working mothers, and securing jobs for black women. They wrote letters to the federal Fair Employment Practices Committee. An official came to Omaha to order the South Omaha packing houses to stop discriminating against black women. Soon after, Moore and some 400 other women were hired. Moore worked in the meatpacking industry for twenty years, managing to retain her position after veterans returned from the war.

Moore rose to become secretary of the meat cutters’ local union. In 1948, she became secretary of the Omaha Metropolitan Labor Council. She further challenged discrimination in the 1950s, when the meatpacking plants attempted to restrict employment. These actions led to Moore's getting fired from the plants; however, she maintained her passion to fight for social justice.

Moore was elected chairwoman of the Douglas County Democratic Central Committee in 1971. She was the first black woman to run for the Omaha City Council. Inspired by listening to Malcolm X’s speeches, Moore decided to start an organization to benefit African-Americans. When she learned her father had lived in the house where Malcolm X had first lived and her family still owned the property, Moore became the founding president of the Malcolm X Memorial Foundation. Her family made their five lots the basis of the foundation's site, eventually acquiring more than 60 lots for the center. She led an effort to have the site recognized (the house was torn down in 1965 before the family recognized its association with the life of Malcolm X.) Today the Foundation works to advance cultural and educational issues.

The Foundation has preserved the Malcolm X House Site, 3448 Pinkney Street, and gained its recognition as a Nebraska historical heritage site and listing on the National Register of Historic Places. The Foundation has plans to develop the property as a park and link it to a nearby municipal park.

Moore continued to look for ways to honor Malcolm X's legacy. In 1989 she proposed renaming the North Omaha Freeway as the Malcolm X Freeway. She led an early 1990s gathering with the African-American Progressive Action Network and the National Malcolm X Commemoration Commission to celebrate Malcolm X's life.

In addition to her work in meatpacking and her public life, Moore owned a grocery store in the 1950s, managed several musical quartets and produced a movie, "The Sacred Beauty," which starred another Omaha woman.

== Personal life ==
In 1927, she married. She and her husband, who later divorced, had a son.

== See also ==
- List of people from North Omaha, Nebraska
- Bibliography of Malcolm X
- Bibliography of Martin Luther King Jr.
