= Ilyasah Shabazz =

American writer, daughter of Malcolm X (born 1962)

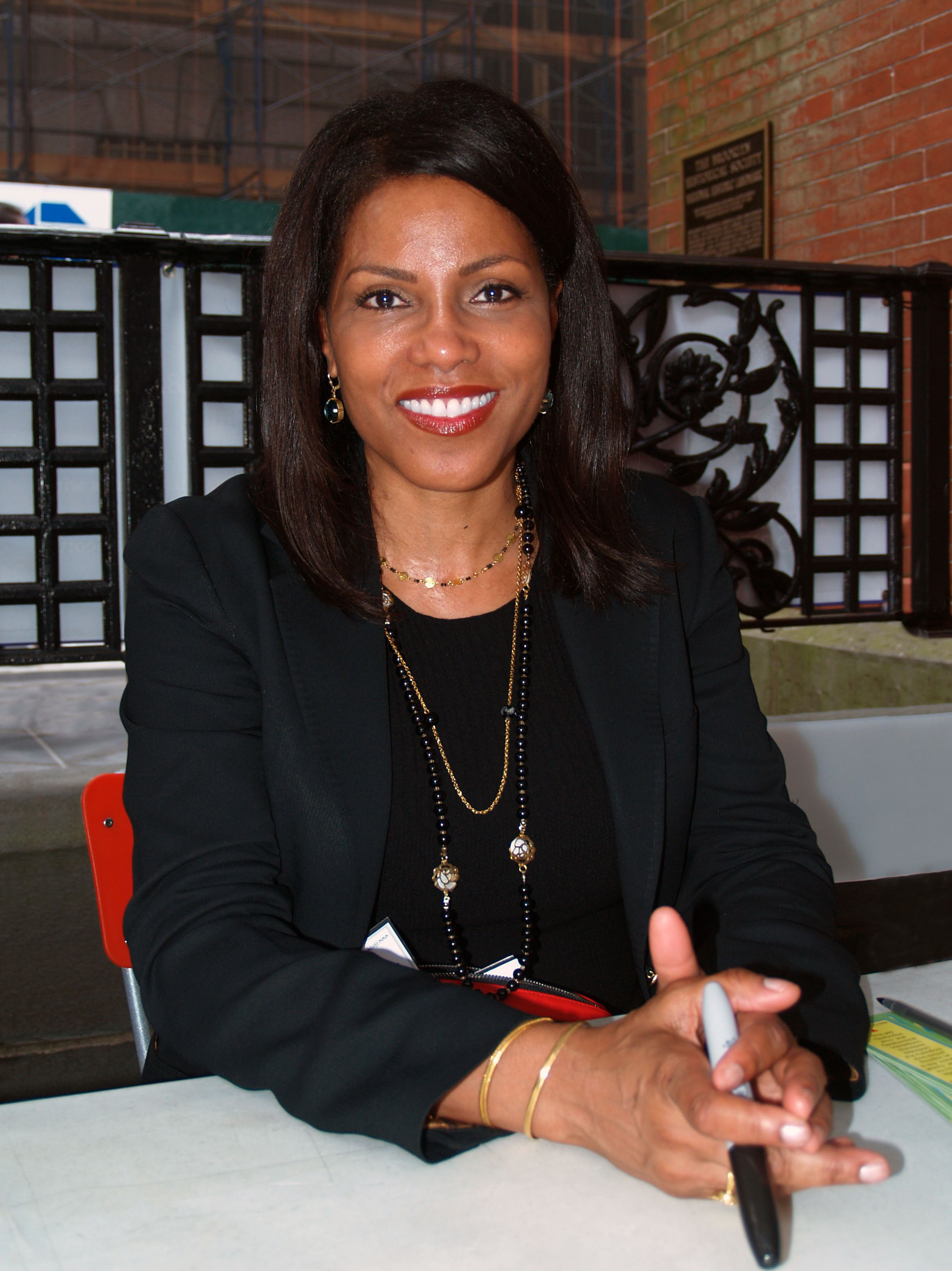
- Shabazz in 2014
- Born: July 22, 1962 (age 64); New York City, U.S.
- Education: State University of New York at New Paltz (BA); Fordham University (MA)
- Occupations: Author; motivational speaker; community organizer; social activist
- Parents: Malcolm X (father); Betty Shabazz (mother)

Ilyasah Shabazz (born July 22, 1962) is an American author, community organizer, social activist, and motivational speaker. She is the third daughter of Malcolm X and Betty Shabazz, and wrote a memoir titled Growing Up X.

== Early life ==
Shabazz was born in Brooklyn, New York, on July 22, 1962. She was named after Elijah Muhammad, leader of the Nation of Islam, the religious and Black nationalist group to which her parents belonged. Shabazz is of African-American, African-Grenadian, English and Scottish descent.

In February 1965, when she was two years old, Shabazz was present, with her mother and sisters, at the assassination of her father. She says she has no memory of the event.

Shabazz had an apolitical upbringing in a racially integrated neighborhood in Mount Vernon, New York. Her family never took part in demonstrations or attended rallies. Together with her sisters, she joined Jack and Jill, a social club for the children of well-off African Americans. She considered an acting career, though her mother was not supportive. Her mother instead took interest in trying to keep her father's presence alive, and baked her cookies, which she would break a piece off to give the impression that her father had eaten it before she arrived.

Concerning her father, Shabazz told an interviewer, "My mother always talked about our father, her husband, but ... she didn't talk about these things that defined my father as the icon." To learn about her father, Shabazz read his autobiography as a college student, and enrolled in a class to learn more.

Shabazz was a student at Hackley School. After high school, she attended State University of New York at New Paltz. When she arrived, other African-American students expected her to be a firebrand. They had already elected her an officer of the Black Student Union.

After graduating, Shabazz earned a master's degree in Education and Human Resource Development from Fordham University and a PhD from Worcester State University .

== Career ==
Shabazz worked for the city of Mount Vernon for more than a dozen years, serving at different times as Director of Public Relations, Director of Public Affairs and Special Events, and Director of Cultural Affairs.

Shabazz wrote Growing Up X, her memoir of her childhood and her personal views on her father, in 2002. It was nominated for an NAACP Image Award for Outstanding Literary Work, Nonfiction. A devout Muslim, she made the pilgrimage to Mecca, the hajj, in 2006 as her father had in 1964 and her mother did in 1965.

In 2014, Shabazz wrote Malcolm Little: The Boy Who Grew Up to Become Malcolm X, a children's book about her father's childhood. It was nominated for an NAACP Image Award for Outstanding Literary Work, Children's. The following year, she wrote a young-adult novel, X, about the same subject. The book was among the ten finalists considered for the National Book Award for Young People's Literature and it won an NAACP Image Award for Outstanding Literary Work – Youth/Teens. It also won honors from the Coretta Scott King Awards and the Walter Dean Myers Awards for Outstanding Children's Literature and was named as a 2016 Bank Street Children's Book Committee's Best Book of the Year. Her middle-grade novel about her mother's childhood, Betty Before X, was published in January 2018 alongside co-author Renée Watson. It was one of the 2019 Bank Street Children's Book Committee Best Books of the Year and received an "Outstanding Merit" recognition

Shabazz is a trustee for the Malcolm X and Dr. Betty Shabazz Memorial and Educational Center, the Malcolm X Foundation, and the Harlem Symphony Orchestra. As of 2017, she is an adjunct professor at John Jay College of Criminal Justice.

== Personal life ==
Shabazz is a longtime resident of Southern Westchester. She grew up in Mount Vernon and presently lives in New Rochelle.

== Bibliography ==
- with Kim McLarin (2002). Growing Up X: A Memoir by the Daughter of Malcolm X. New York: One World. ISBN 978-0-345-44495-0.
- ——— (2014). Malcolm Little: The Boy Who Grew Up to Become Malcolm X. Illustrated by A.G. Ford. New York: Atheneum Books for Young Readers. ISBN 978-1-4424-1216-3.
- Boyd, Herb; ———, eds. (2014). The Diary of Malcolm X: 1964. Chicago: Third World Press. ISBN 978-0-88378-351-1.
- with Kekla Magoon (2015). X: A Novel. Somerville, Mass.: Candlewick Press. ISBN 978-0-763-66967-6.
- with Renée Watson (2018). Betty Before X. New York: Farrar, Straus and Giroux. ISBN 978-0-374-30610-6.
- with Tiffany D. Jackson (2021). The Awakening of Malcolm X. Farrar, Straus and Giroux. ISBN 978-0-374-31329-6.
- ——— (2026). Malcolm in the Desert: Wisdom from the Spiritual Transformation of Malcom X. New York: Hachette. ISBN 978-1-5387-7432-8.

== See also ==
- Bibliography of Malcolm X
- Bibliography of Martin Luther King Jr.
