= Jared Ball =

American academic of communication studies

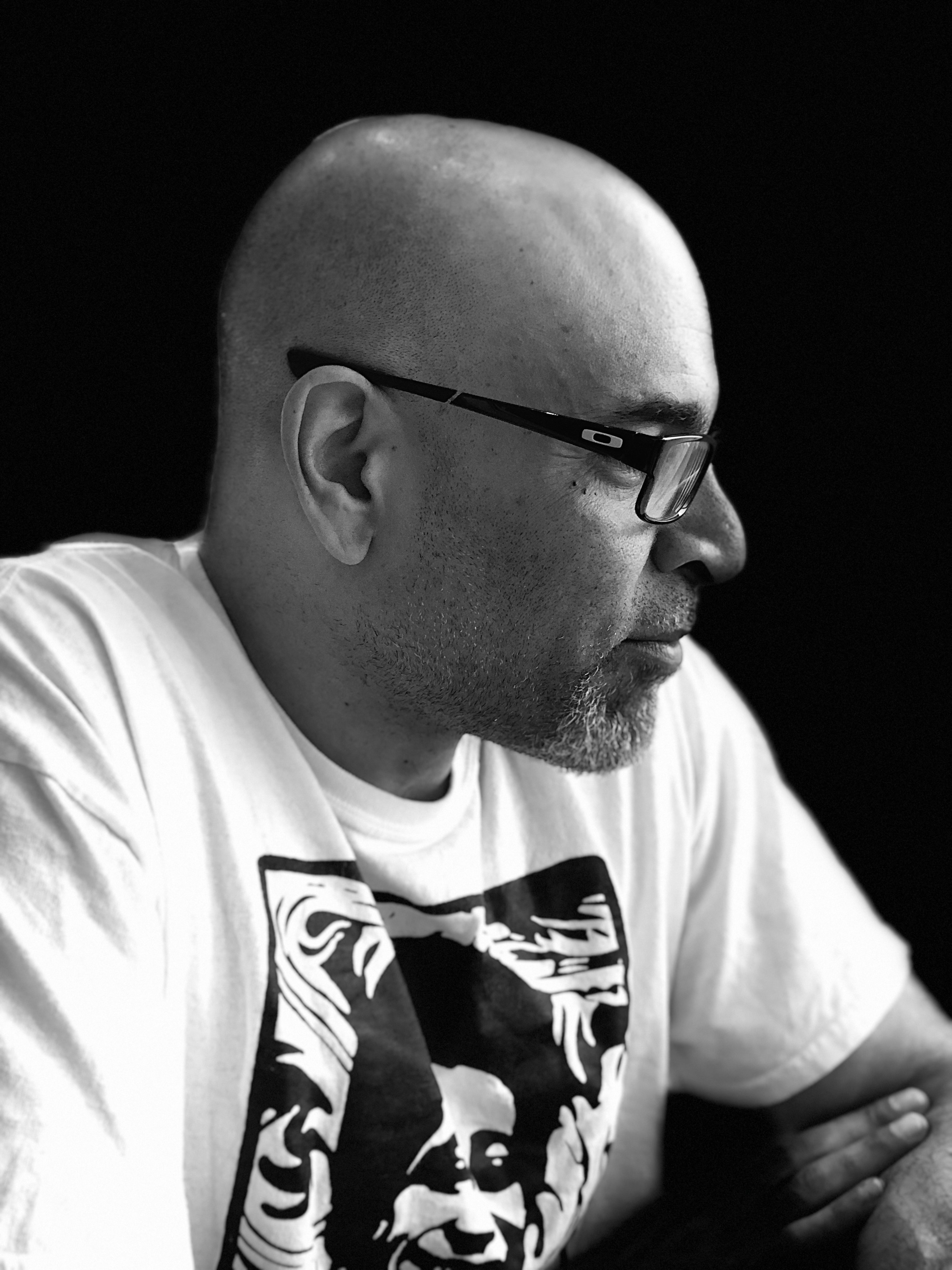
- Ball in 2019
- Education: University of Maryland at College Park(Ph.D.); Cornell University(MA); Frostburg State University(BS)
- Known for: Media Studies, Africana Studies, The Myth and Propaganda of Black Buying Power
- Scientific career
- Fields: Colonialism, Mass Media, Hip Hop Education, African American Studies
- Workplaces: Morgan State University

Jared A. Ball (born September 28, 1971) is an American academic and political activist. He is a professor of communication studies and Africana / Black Studies at Morgan State University in Baltimore, Maryland, United States. Ball is also host of the podcast “iMiXWHATiLiKE!” and a co-founder of Black Power Media. In the 2008 presidential election, Ball sought the nomination of the Green Party of the United States before eventually dropping out and endorsing Congresswoman Cynthia McKinney.

== Education and career ==
Ball is a graduate of the University of Maryland at College Park, the Cornell Africana Studies and Research Center at Cornell University and Frostburg State University. Ball is the author of The Myth and Propaganda of Black Buying Power (Palgrave Macmillan, 2020, 2nd Ed. 2023), I Mix What I Like! A Mixtape Manifesto and co-editor of A Lie of Reinvention: Correcting Manning Marable's Malcolm X, a critique of Manning Marable's Malcolm X: A Life of Reinvention. He has also been known for his work on Pacifica Radio, Black Agenda Report and iMiXWHATiLiKE.ORG.
