= Hackley School =

Private preparatory school in Tarrytown, New York, U.S.

Coordinates: 41°4′12.43″N 73°50′33.89″W

- Tarrytown, New York; United States

Information
- Type: Private, preparatory school (with small boarding)
- Motto: Iuncti Iuvamus (United, we help one another)
- Established: 1899
- Founder: Mrs. Frances A. Hackley
- Head of school: Charles Franklin
- Grades: K–12
- Gender: All-boys (at founding); became co-educational
- Enrollment: Upper School: 375; Middle School: 230
- Colors: Black, gray, yellow and white
- Mascot: Hornet
- Publication: Hackley Review
- Newspaper: The Dial
- Yearbook: The Hilltop
- Website: hackleyschool.org

Hackley School is a private college preparatory school located in Tarrytown, New York, and is a member of the Ivy Preparatory School League.

Founded in 1899 by philanthropist Frances Hackley, the school was intended to be a Unitarian alternative to Episcopal boarding schools. Since its founding, Hackley has dropped its Unitarian affiliations and changed from all-boys to coeducational.

The head of school is Charles Franklin.

== History ==
=== Founding ===
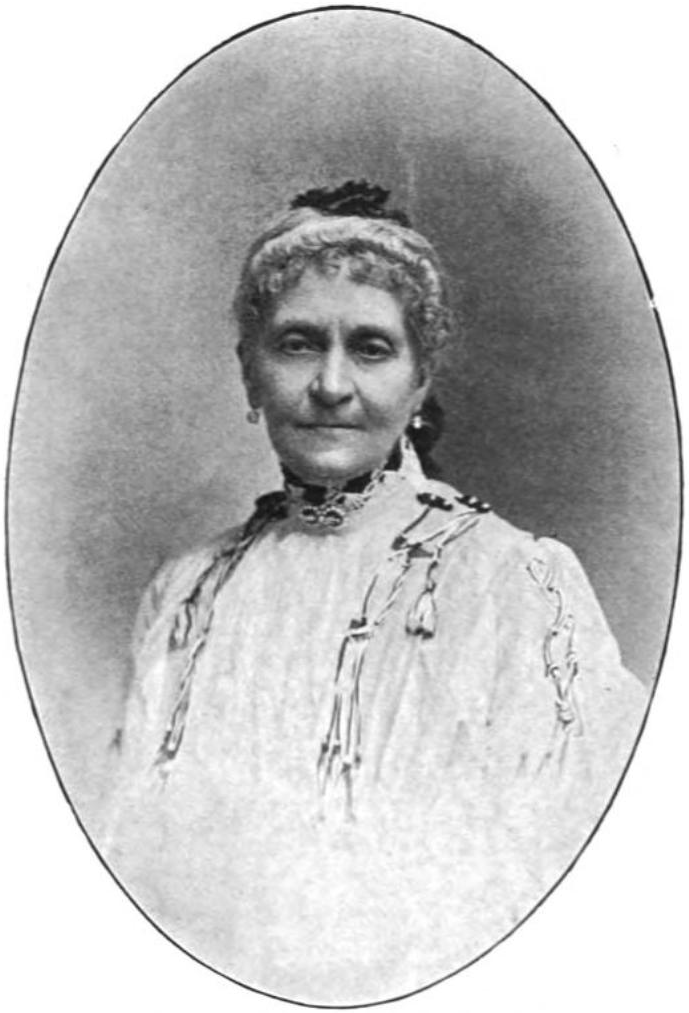
Frances Hackley (1908)

Frances Hackley, a wealthy widow and leading supporter of the Unitarian movement, decided to give her summer mansion in Tarrytown to a school for boys. She provided substantial funding to refurbish the mansion for school purposes and to operate the school for several years.

In the spring of 1899, a board of trustees was formed and a headmaster hired. The first students arrived in the autumn of 1899 and resided in what is today called Hackley Hall.

=== Expansion ===
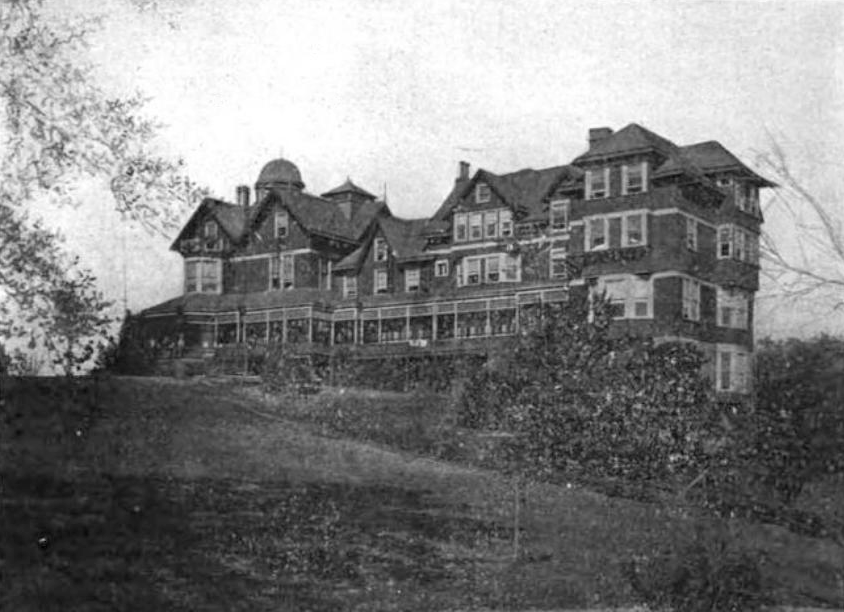
Hackley Lower School in 1908

In the fall of 1899, Theodore Chickering Williams and Seaver Buck, the first headmaster and the first master hired, respectively, searched for additional land. They found a large estate for sale near the grounds of what later became Marymount College, and purchased it with funds from Hackley. The buildings on the estate were torn down immediately, and within a short period, construction began on the buildings that would eventually join to form the Hackley quadrangle. The first buildings constructed were Goodhue Hall and the Minot Savage building. They were in use for the first time in 1902–1903. The remaining buildings, including the Sarah Goodhue King Chapel and the Headmaster's house, were completed by 1908. Inscribed above one of Hackley's doors is the phrase "Enter Here to Be and Find a Friend."

From the beginning, Hackley was non-sectarian, but shaped by Unitarian values. An early and influential president of the board of trustees was Samuel A. Eliot, a Unitarian minister. A vigorous interscholastic sports program began during the first years with football already prominent in 1900–1901.

A handbook published in 1920 stated that "Of the two hundred and sixty alumni the great majority have entered Harvard and Yale. The boys come from well to do families, chiefly of New York and New England."

Clarence Francis, a famous industrialist at the time and special consultant to President Dwight D. Eisenhower, was the commencement speaker at Hackley in 1959, in order to commemorate the school's sixtieth anniversary.

=== Headmasters ===
Walter Boutwell Gage, among the teachers who taught in Hackley's first term, was made headmaster in 1908.

Madison Grant led the school during the Second World War. In 1940, the school hosted sixty liberal ministers to address questions of war and peace for several days.

Peter Gibbon published a book titled A Call to Heroism in 2003. He also wrote for several newspapers, magazines, and professional journals. Walter Johnson was the eleventh headmaster from 1995 to 2016.

=== Destruction of Goodhue Memorial Hall (2007) ===
On August 4, 2007, a fire, sparked by an intense lightning storm, destroyed Goodhue Memorial Hall. The Kaskel Library and its 27,000 volumes, artwork, and other resources were lost. The stone facade of the building remained intact.

== Music ==
Hackley is known for the quality of its musical training. Composer Charles Griffes taught there from 1907 until 1920.

== Student life ==
=== Sports ===
The Hackley School is a part of the Ivy Preparatory School League. There are teams for boys and girls in most of the sports typically offered by New England prep schools.

=== Boarding program ===
The Upper School's five-day boarding program houses up to thirty students of all genders.

=== Student body ===
Newsweek editor Naveed Jamali, who attended the school briefly around 1990, wrote of his lasting memory of the student parking lot: it was filled with "shiny new" expensive cars like Porsches and BMWs.

== Notable people ==
=== Alumni ===
- Alan Seeger 1906, poet
- F. O. Matthiessen 1919, literary critic
- Philip Johnson 1923, architect
- Frederick R. Koch 1951, billionaire collector and philanthropist
- George Hamilton 1957, actor
- Claude Canizares 1963, astrophysicist
- Malcolm Mooney 1964, musician (notably Can's original singer) and visual artist
- Jim Reilly 1966, former football player
- Alec Wilkinson 1970, writer (The Happiest Man in the World)
- Chris Berman 1973, sportscaster (ESPN)
- Keith Olbermann 1975, newscaster
- Ilyasah Shabazz 1979, writer (Growing Up X)
- Ken Noda 1980, pianist, vocal coach, and composer
- Cathy Schulman 1983, producer of Academy Award winner for Best Picture, Crash
- Eric Bress 1987, filmmaker
- Dara Khosrowshahi 1987, chief executive officer, Uber
- Eugene Jarecki 1987, documentary filmmaker (Why We Fight)
- Nikolas P. Kerest 1990 United States Attorney for the Commonwealth of Vermont
- Ian Rapoport 1998, reporter (NFL Network)
- Jordan Rapp 1998, triathlete
- Jenifer Rajkumar 2000, politician
- Ryan Ruocco 2004, sports broadcaster
- Avery Trufelman 2009, radio journalist and podcaster
- Jack Houghteling 2010, novelist
- Andrew Stopera 2015, national team curler
- Celia Rose Gooding 2018, actress and singer
- Daniel Casper 2019, national team curler
