= The Autobiography of Malcolm X =

Autobiography of African-American Muslim minister and human rights activist

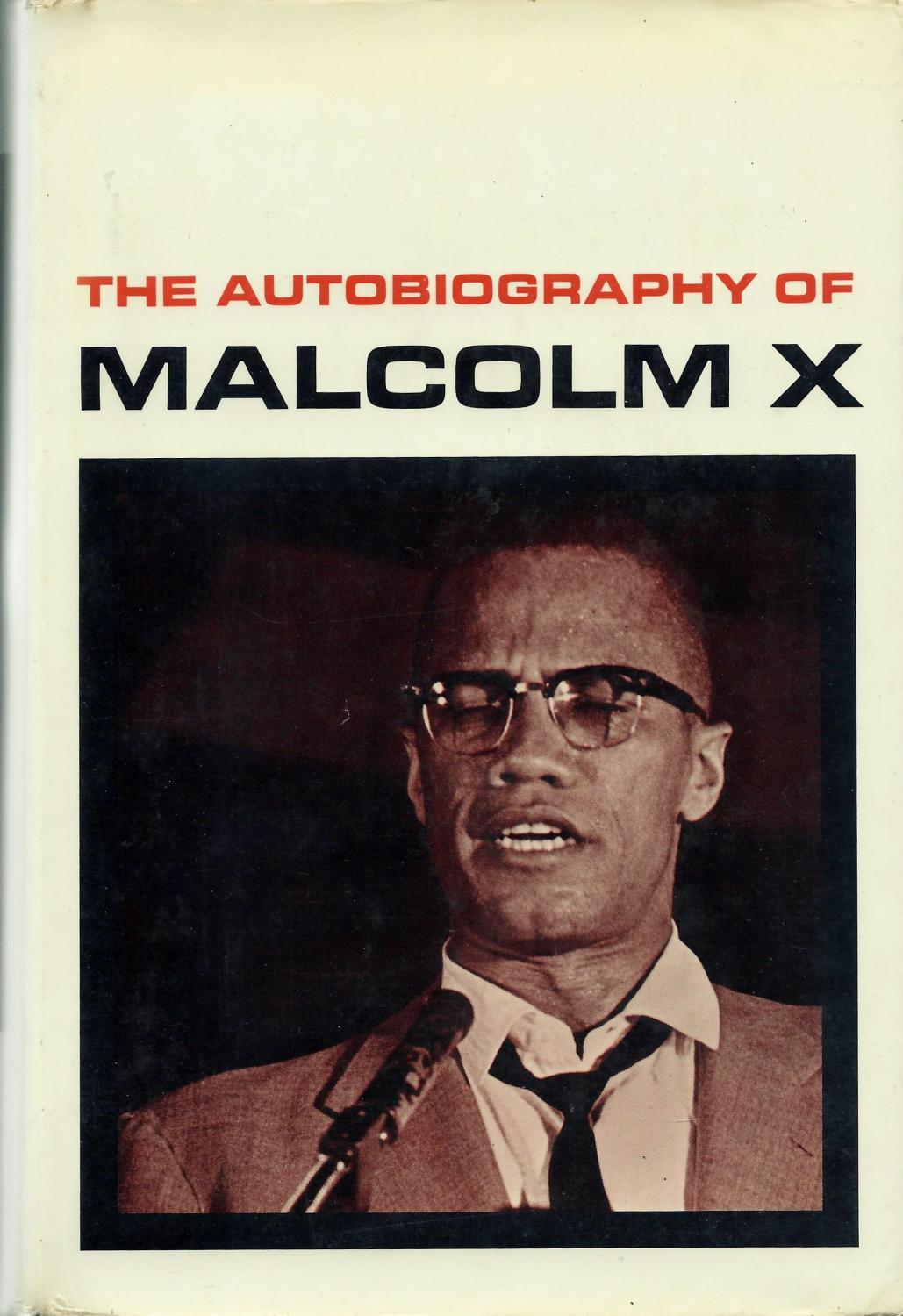
- First edition
- Author: Malcolm X with Alex Haley
- Language: English
- Genre: Autobiography
- Published: October 29, 1965
- Publisher: Grove Press
- Publication place: United States
- OCLC: 219493184

The Autobiography of Malcolm X is an autobiography written by Muslim American minister and activist Malcolm X in collaboration with American journalist Alex Haley. It was released posthumously on October 29, 1965, nine months after his assassination. Haley coauthored the book based on a series of in-depth interviews he conducted between 1963 and 1965. The Autobiography is a religious conversion narrative which outlines Malcolm X's philosophy of Black pride, Black nationalism, and pan-Africanism. After Malcolm X was killed, Haley wrote the book's epilogue, which describes their collaborative process and the events at the end of Malcolm's life.

While Malcolm X and scholars contemporary to its publication regarded Haley as the book's ghostwriter, modern scholars tend to regard him as an essential collaborator who intentionally muted his authorial voice in order to create the effect of Malcolm X speaking directly to readers. Haley influenced some of Malcolm X's stylistic choices. For example, Malcolm X left the Nation of Islam during the period when he was working on the book with Haley. Rather than rewriting earlier chapters as a polemic against the Nation, which Malcolm X had rejected, Haley persuaded him to favor a style of "suspense and drama". According to biographer Manning Marable, "Haley was particularly worried about what he viewed as Malcolm X's anti-Semitism" and rewrote material to eliminate it.

When the Autobiography was published, The New York Times reviewer Eliot Fremont-Smith described it as a "brilliant, painful, important book". In 1967, historian John William Ward wrote that it would become a classic American autobiography. In 1998, Time named The Autobiography of Malcolm X as one of ten "required reading" nonfiction books. James Baldwin and Arnold Perl adapted the book as a screenplay, which later provided the source material for Spike Lee's 1992 film Malcolm X.

== Summary ==
Published posthumously, The Autobiography of Malcolm X is an account of the life of Malcolm X, born Malcolm Little (1925–1965), who became a human rights activist. Beginning with his mother's pregnancy, the book describes Malcolm's childhood first in Omaha, Nebraska and then in the area around Lansing and Mason, Michigan, the death of his father under questionable circumstances, and his mother's deteriorating mental health that resulted in her commitment to a psychiatric hospital. X's young adulthood in Boston and New York City is covered, as well as his involvement in organized crime. This led to his arrest and subsequent eight- to ten-year prison sentence, of which he served six-and-a-half years (1946–1952). The book addresses his ministry with Elijah Muhammad and the Nation of Islam (1952–1963) and his emergence as the organization's national spokesman. It documents his disillusionment with and departure from the Nation of Islam in March 1964, his pilgrimage to Mecca, which catalyzed his conversion to orthodox Sunni Islam, and his travels in Africa. Malcolm X was assassinated in New York's Audubon Ballroom in February 1965, before the book was finished. His co-author, the journalist Alex Haley, summarizes the last days of Malcolm X's life, and describes in detail their working agreement, including Haley's personal views on his subject, in the Autobiography's epilogue.

== Genre ==
The Autobiography is a spiritual conversion narrative that outlines Malcolm X's philosophy of black pride, black nationalism, and pan-Africanism. Literary critic Arnold Rampersad and Malcolm X biographer Michael Eric Dyson agree that the narrative of the Autobiography resembles the Augustinian approach to confessional narrative. Augustine's Confessions and The Autobiography of Malcolm X both relate the early hedonistic lives of their subjects, document deep philosophical change for spiritual reasons, and describe later disillusionment with religious groups their subjects had once revered. Haley and autobiographical scholar Albert E. Stone compare the narrative to the Icarus myth. Author Paul John Eakin and writer Alex Gillespie suggest that part of the Autobiography's rhetorical power comes from "the vision of a man whose swiftly unfolding career had outstripped the possibilities of the traditional autobiography he had meant to write", thus destroying "the illusion of the finished and unified personality".

In addition to functioning as a spiritual conversion narrative, The Autobiography of Malcolm X also reflects generic elements from other distinctly American literary forms, from the Puritan conversion narrative of Jonathan Edwards and the secular self-analyses of Benjamin Franklin, to the African American slave narratives. This aesthetic decision on the part of Malcolm X and Haley also has profound implications for the thematic content of the work, as the progressive movement between forms that is evidenced in the text reflects the personal progression of its subject. Considering this, the editors of the Norton Anthology of African American Literature assert that, "Malcolm's Autobiography takes pains to interrogate the very models through which his persona achieves gradual self-understanding...his story's inner logic defines his life as a quest for an authentic mode of being, a quest that demands a constant openness to new ideas requiring fresh kinds of expression."

== Construction ==
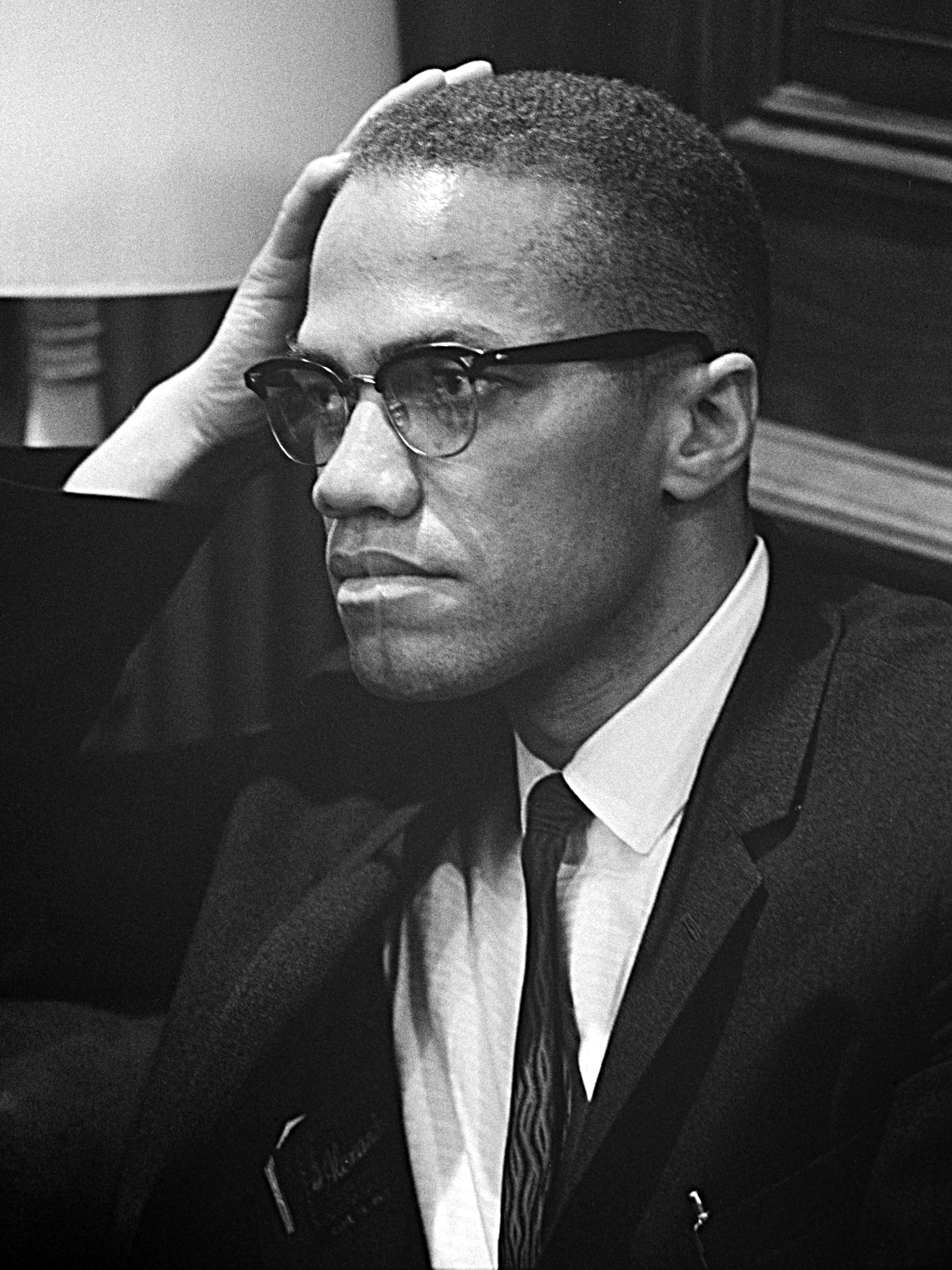
Malcolm X waiting for a press conference to begin on March 26, 1964

Haley coauthored The Autobiography of Malcolm X, and also performed the basic functions of a ghostwriter and biographical amanuensis, writing, compiling, and editing the Autobiography based on more than 50 in-depth interviews he conducted with Malcolm X between 1963 and his subject's 1965 assassination. The two first met in 1959, when Haley wrote an article about the Nation of Islam for Reader's Digest, and again when Haley interviewed Malcolm X for Playboy in 1962.

In 1963 the Doubleday publishing company asked Haley to write a book about the life of Malcolm X. American writer and literary critic Harold Bloom writes, "When Haley approached Malcolm with the idea, Malcolm gave him a startled look ..." Haley recalls, "It was one of the few times I have ever seen him uncertain." After Malcolm X was granted permission from Elijah Muhammad, he and Haley commenced work on the Autobiography, a process which began as two-and three-hour interview sessions at Haley's studio in Greenwich Village. Bloom writes, "Malcolm was critical of Haley's middle-class status, as well as his Christian beliefs and twenty years of service in the U.S. Military."

When work on the Autobiography began in early 1963, Haley grew frustrated with Malcolm X's tendency to speak only about Elijah Muhammad and the Nation of Islam. Haley reminded him that the book was supposed to be about Malcolm X, not Muhammad or the Nation of Islam, a comment which angered Malcolm X. Haley eventually shifted the focus of the interviews toward the life of his subject when he asked Malcolm X about his mother:

I said, "Mr. Malcolm, could you tell me something about your mother?" And I will never, ever forget how he stopped almost as if he was suspended like a marionette. And he said, "I remember the kind of dresses she used to wear. They were old and faded and gray." And then he walked some more. And he said, "I remember how she was always bent over the stove, trying to stretch what little we had." And that was the beginning, that night, of his walk. And he walked that floor until just about daybreak.

Though Haley is ostensibly a ghostwriter on the Autobiography, modern scholars tend to treat him as an essential and core collaborator who acted as an invisible figure in the composition of the work. He minimized his own voice, and signed a contract to limit his authorial discretion in favor of producing what looked like verbatim copy. Manning Marable considers the view of Haley as simply a ghostwriter as a deliberate narrative construction of black scholars of the day who wanted to see the book as a singular creation of a dynamic leader and martyr. Marable argues that a critical analysis of the Autobiography, or the full relationship between Malcolm X and Haley, does not support this view; he describes it instead as a collaboration.

Haley's contribution to the work is notable, and several scholars discuss how it should be characterized. In a view shared by Eakin, Stone and Dyson, psychobiographical writer Eugene Victor Wolfenstein writes that Haley performed the duties of a quasi-psychoanalytic Freudian psychiatrist and spiritual confessor. Gillespie suggests, and Wolfenstein agrees, that the act of self-narration was itself a transformative process that spurred significant introspection and personal change in the life of its subject.

Haley exercised discretion over content, guided Malcolm X in critical stylistic and rhetorical choices, and compiled the work. In the epilogue to the Autobiography, Haley describes an agreement he made with Malcolm X, who demanded that: "Nothing can be in this book's manuscript that I didn't say and nothing can be left out that I want in it." As such, Haley wrote an addendum to the contract specifically referring to the book as an "as told to" account. In the agreement, Haley gained an "important concession": "I asked for—and he gave—his permission that at the end of the book I could write comments of my own about him which would not be subject to his review." These comments became the epilogue to the Autobiography, which Haley wrote after the death of his subject.

=== Narrative presentation ===
In "Malcolm X: The Art of Autobiography", writer and professor John Edgar Wideman examines in detail the narrative landscapes found in biography. Wideman suggests that as a writer, Haley was attempting to satisfy "multiple allegiances": to his subject, to his publisher, to his "editor's agenda", and to himself. Haley was an important contributor to the Autobiography's popular appeal, writes Wideman. Wideman expounds upon the "inevitable compromise" of biographers, and argues that in order to allow readers to insert themselves into the broader socio-psychological narrative, neither coauthor's voice is as strong as it could have been. Wideman details some of the specific pitfalls Haley encountered while coauthoring the Autobiography:

You are serving many masters, and inevitably you are compromised. The man speaks and you listen but you do not take notes, the first compromise and perhaps betrayal. You may attempt through various stylistic conventions and devices to reconstitute for the reader your experience of hearing face to face the man's words. The sound of the man's narration may be represented by vocabulary, syntax, imagery, graphic devices of various sorts—quotation marks, punctuation, line breaks, visual patterning of white space and black space, markers that encode print analogs to speech—vernacular interjections, parentheses, ellipses, asterisks, footnotes, italics, dashes ....

In the body of the Autobiography, Wideman writes, Haley's authorial agency is seemingly absent: "Haley does so much with so little fuss ... an approach that appears so rudimentary in fact conceals sophisticated choices, quiet mastery of a medium". Wideman argues that Haley wrote the body of the Autobiography in a manner of Malcolm X's choosing and the epilogue as an extension of the biography itself, his subject having given him carte blanche for the chapter. Haley's voice in the body of the book is a tactic, Wideman writes, producing a text nominally written by Malcolm X but seemingly written by no author. The subsumption of Haley's own voice in the narrative allows the reader to feel as though the voice of Malcolm X is speaking directly and continuously, a stylistic tactic that, in Wideman's view, was a matter of Haley's authorial choice: "Haley grants Malcolm the tyrannical authority of an author, a disembodied speaker whose implied presence blends into the reader's imagining of the tale being told."

In "Two Create One: The Act of Collaboration in Recent Black Autobiography: Ossie Guffy, Nate Shaw, and Malcolm X", Stone argues that Haley played an "essential role" in "recovering the historical identity" of Malcolm X. Stone also reminds the reader that collaboration is a cooperative endeavor, requiring more than Haley's prose alone can provide, "convincing and coherent" as it may be:

Though a writer's skill and imagination have combined words and voice into a more or less convincing and coherent narrative, the actual writer [Haley] has no large fund of memories to draw upon: the subject's [Malcolm X] memory and imagination are the original sources of the arranged story and have also come into play critically as the text takes final shape. Thus where material comes from, and what has been done to it are separable and of equal significance in collaborations.

In Stone's estimation, supported by Wideman, the source of autobiographical material and the efforts made to shape them into a workable narrative are distinct, and of equal value in a critical assessment of the collaboration that produced the Autobiography. While Haley's skills as writer have significant influence on the narrative's shape, Stone writes, they require a "subject possessed of a powerful memory and imagination" to produce a workable narrative.

=== Collaboration between Malcolm X and Haley ===
The collaboration between Malcolm X and Haley took on many dimensions; editing, revising and composing the Autobiography was a power struggle between two men with sometimes competing ideas of the final shape for the book. Haley "took pains to show how Malcolm dominated their relationship and tried to control the composition of the book", writes Rampersad. Rampersad also writes that Haley was aware that memory is selective and that autobiographies are "almost by definition projects in fiction", and that it was his responsibility as biographer to select material based on his authorial discretion. The narrative shape crafted by Haley and Malcolm X is the result of a life account "distorted and diminished" by the "process of selection", Rampersad suggests, yet the narrative's shape may in actuality be more revealing than the narrative itself. In the epilogue Haley describes the process used to edit the manuscript, giving specific examples of how Malcolm X controlled the language.

"You can't bless Allah!" he exclaimed, changing "bless" to "praise." ... He scratched red through "we kids." "Kids are goats!" he exclaimed sharply.

— Haley, describing work on the manuscript, quoting Malcolm X

While Haley ultimately deferred to Malcolm X's specific choice of words when composing the manuscript, Wideman writes, "the nature of writing biography or autobiography ... means that Haley's promise to Malcolm, his intent to be a 'dispassionate chronicler', is a matter of disguising, not removing, his authorial presence." Haley played an important role in persuading Malcolm X not to re-edit the book as a polemic against Elijah Muhammad and the Nation of Islam at a time when Haley already had most of the material needed to complete the book, and asserted his authorial agency when the Autobiography's "fractured construction", caused by Malcolm X's rift with Elijah Muhammad and the Nation of Islam, "overturned the design" of the manuscript and created a narrative crisis. In the Autobiography's epilogue, Haley describes the incident:

I sent Malcolm X some rough chapters to read. I was appalled when they were soon returned, red-inked in many places where he had told of his almost father-and-son relationship with Elijah Muhammad. Telephoning Malcolm X, I reminded him of his previous decisions, and I stressed that if those chapters contained such telegraphing to readers of what was to lie ahead, then the book would automatically be robbed of some of its building suspense and drama. Malcolm X said, gruffly, 'Whose book is this?' I told him 'yours, of course,' and that I only made the objection in my position as a writer. But late that night Malcolm X telephoned. 'I'm sorry. You're right. I was upset about something. Forget what I wanted changed, let what you already had stand.' I never again gave him chapters to review unless I was with him. Several times I would covertly watch him frown and wince as he read, but he never again asked for any change in what he had originally said.

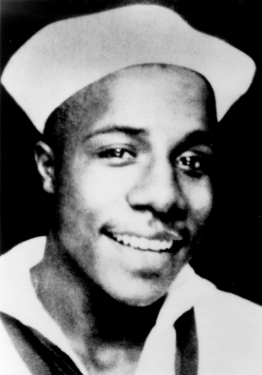
Haley in the United States Coast Guard, 1939

Haley's warning to avoid "telegraphing to readers" and his advice about "building suspense and drama" demonstrate his efforts to influence the narrative's content and assert his authorial agency while ultimately deferring final discretion to Malcolm X. In the above passage Haley asserts his authorial presence, reminding his subject that as a writer he has concerns about narrative direction and focus, but presenting himself in such a way as to give no doubt that he deferred final approval to his subject. In the words of Eakin, "Because this complex vision of his existence is clearly not that of the early sections of the Autobiography, Alex Haley and Malcolm X were forced to confront the consequences of this discontinuity in perspective for the narrative, already a year old." Malcolm X, after giving the matter some thought, later accepted Haley's suggestion.

While Marable argues that Malcolm X was his own best revisionist, he also points out that Haley's collaborative role in shaping the Autobiography was notable. Haley influenced the narrative's direction and tone while remaining faithful to his subject's syntax and diction. Marable writes that Haley worked "hundreds of sentences into paragraphs", and organized them into "subject areas". Author William L. Andrews writes:

[T]he narrative evolved out of Haley's interviews with Malcolm, but Malcolm had read Haley's typescript, and had made interlineated notes and often stipulated substantive changes, at least in the earlier parts of the text. As the work progressed, however, according to Haley, Malcolm yielded more and more to the authority of his ghostwriter, partly because Haley never let Malcolm read the manuscript unless he was present to defend it, partly because in his last months Malcolm had less and less opportunity to reflect on the text of his life because he was so busy living it, and partly because Malcolm had eventually resigned himself to letting Haley's ideas about effective storytelling take precedence over his own desire to denounce straightaway those whom he had once revered.

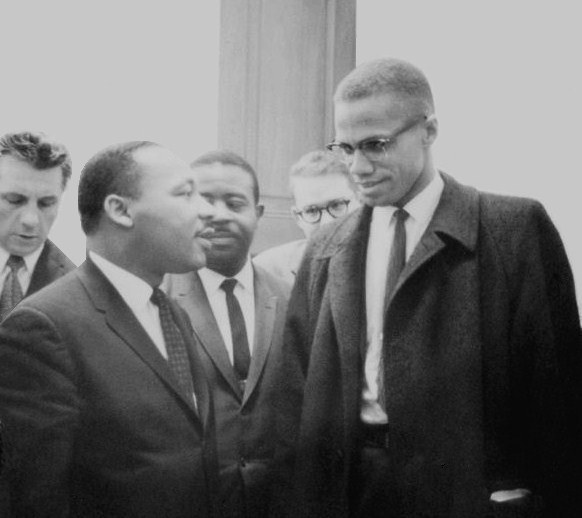
Martin Luther King Jr. and Malcolm X meeting before a press conference after the Senate debate on the Civil Rights Act of 1964. This was the only time the two men ever met and their meeting lasted only one minute.

Andrews suggests that Haley's role expanded because the book's subject became less available to micro-manage the manuscript, and "Malcolm had eventually resigned himself" to allowing "Haley's ideas about effective storytelling" to shape the narrative.

Marable studied the Autobiography manuscript "raw materials" archived by Haley's biographer, Anne Romaine, and described a critical element of the collaboration, Haley's writing tactic to capture the voice of his subject accurately, a disjoint system of data mining that included notes on scrap paper, in-depth interviews, and long "free style" discussions. Marable writes, "Malcolm also had a habit of scribbling notes to himself as he spoke." Haley would secretly "pocket these sketchy notes" and reassemble them in a sub rosa attempt to integrate Malcolm X's "subconscious reflections" into the "workable narrative". This is an example of Haley asserting authorial agency during the writing of the Autobiography, indicating that their relationship was fraught with minor power struggles. Wideman and Rampersad agree with Marable's description of Haley's book-writing process.

The timing of the collaboration meant that Haley occupied an advantageous position to document the multiple conversion experiences of Malcolm X and his challenge was to form them, however incongruent, into a cohesive workable narrative. Dyson suggests that "profound personal, intellectual, and ideological changes ... led him to order events of his life to support a mythology of metamorphosis and transformation". Marable addresses the confounding factors of the publisher and Haley's authorial influence, passages that support the argument that while Malcolm X may have considered Haley a ghostwriter, he acted in actuality as a coauthor, at times without Malcolm X's direct knowledge or expressed consent:

Although Malcolm X retained final approval of their hybrid text, he was not privy to the actual editorial processes superimposed from Haley's side. The Library of Congress held the answers. This collection includes the papers of Doubleday's then-executive editor, Kenneth McCormick, who had worked closely with Haley for several years as the Autobiography had been constructed. As in the Romaine papers, I found more evidence of Haley's sometimes-weekly private commentary with McCormick about the laborious process of composing the book. They also revealed how several attorneys retained by Doubleday closely monitored and vetted entire sections of the controversial text in 1964, demanding numerous name changes, the reworking and deletion of blocks of paragraphs, and so forth. In late 1963, Haley was particularly worried about what he viewed as Malcolm X's anti-Semitism. He therefore rewrote material to eliminate a number of negative statements about Jews in the book manuscript, with the explicit covert goal of 'getting them past Malcolm X,' without his coauthor's knowledge or consent. Thus, the censorship of Malcolm X had begun well prior to his assassination.

Marable says the resulting text was stylistically and ideologically distinct from what Marable believes Malcolm X would have written without Haley's influence, and it also differs from what may have actually been said in the interviews between Haley and Malcolm X.

=== Myth-making ===
In Making Malcolm: The Myth and Meaning of Malcolm X, Dyson criticizes historians and biographers of the time for re-purposing the Autobiography as a transcendent narrative by a "mythological" Malcolm X without being critical enough of the underlying ideas. Further, because much of the available biographical studies of Malcolm X have been written by white authors, Dyson suggests their ability to "interpret black experience" is suspect. The Autobiography of Malcolm X, Dyson says, reflects both Malcolm X's goal of narrating his life story for public consumption and Haley's political ideologies. Dyson writes, "The Autobiography of Malcolm X ... has been criticized for avoiding or distorting certain facts. Indeed, the autobiography is as much a testament to Haley's ingenuity in shaping the manuscript as it is a record of Malcolm's attempt to tell his story."

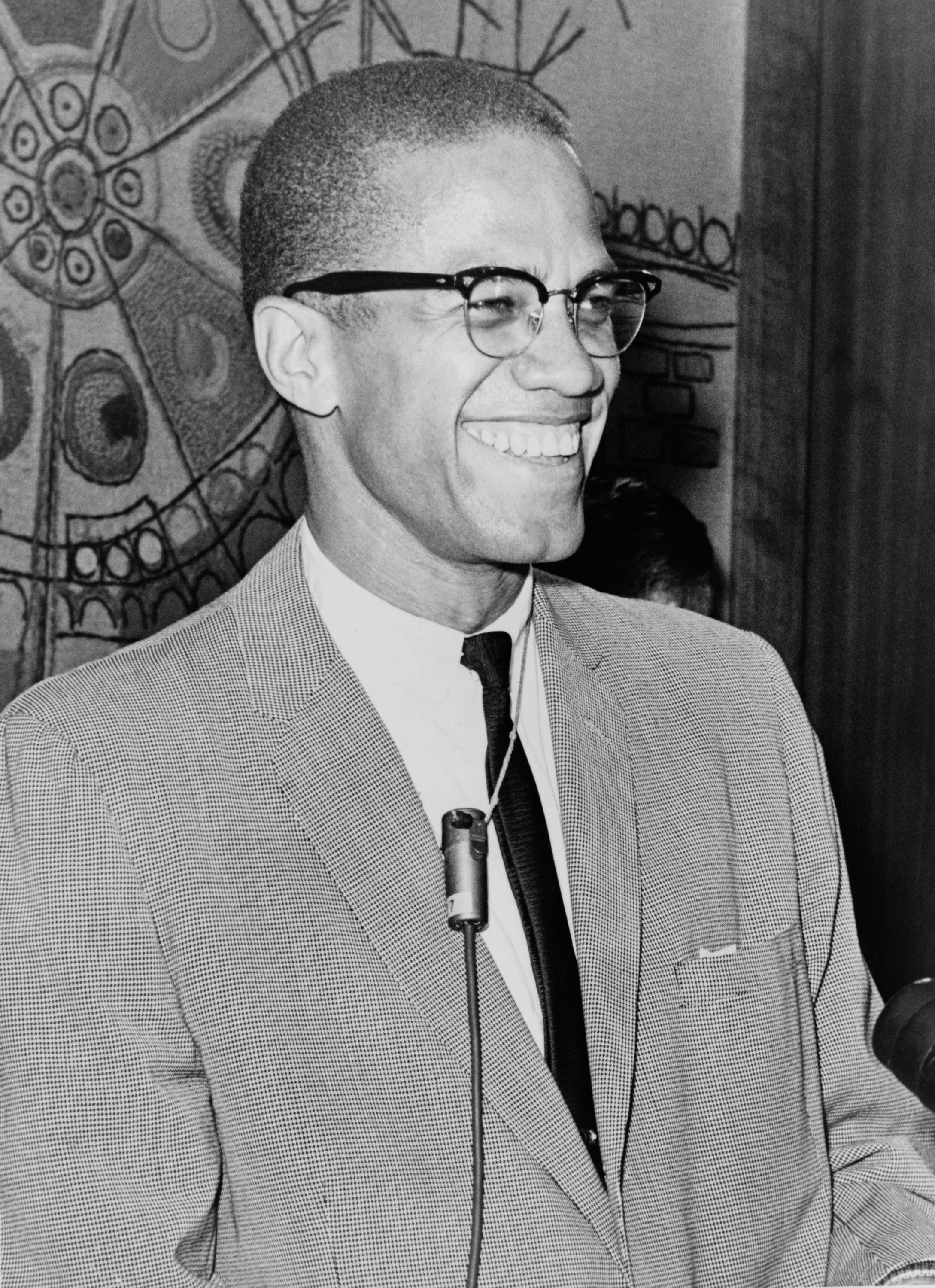
Malcolm X, March 12, 1964

Rampersad suggests that Haley understood autobiographies as "almost fiction". In "The Color of His Eyes: Bruce Perry's Malcolm and Malcolm's Malcolm", Rampersad criticizes Perry's biography, Malcolm: The Life of a Man Who Changed Black America, and makes the general point that the writing of the Autobiography is part of the narrative of blackness in the 20th century and consequently should "not be held utterly beyond inquiry". To Rampersad, the Autobiography is about psychology, ideology, a conversion narrative, and the myth-making process. "Malcolm inscribed in it the terms of his understanding of the form even as the unstable, even treacherous form concealed and distorted particular aspects of his quest. But there is no Malcolm untouched by doubt or fiction. Malcolm's Malcolm is in itself a fabrication; the 'truth' about him is impossible to know." Rampersad suggests that since his 1965 assassination, Malcolm X has "become the desires of his admirers, who have reshaped memory, historical record and the autobiography according to their wishes, which is to say, according to their needs as they perceive them." Further, Rampersad says, many admirers of Malcolm X perceive "accomplished and admirable" figures like Martin Luther King Jr., and W. E. B. Du Bois inadequate to fully express black humanity as it struggles with oppression, "while Malcolm is seen as the apotheosis of black individual greatness ... he is a perfect hero—his wisdom is surpassing, his courage definitive, his sacrifice messianic". Rampersad suggests that devotees have helped shape the myth of Malcolm X.

Author Joe Wood writes:

[T]he autobiography iconizes Malcolm twice, not once. Its second Malcolm—the El-Hajj Malik El-Shabazz finale—is a mask with no distinct ideology, it is not particularly Islamic, not particularly nationalist, not particularly humanist. Like any well crafted icon or story, the mask is evidence of its subject's humanity, of Malcolm's strong human spirit. But both masks hide as much character as they show. The first mask served a nationalism Malcolm had rejected before the book was finished; the second is mostly empty and available.

To Eakin, a significant portion of the Autobiography involves Haley and Malcolm X shaping the fiction of the completed self. Stone writes that Haley's description of the Autobiography's composition makes clear that this fiction is "especially misleading in the case of Malcolm X"; both Haley and the Autobiography itself are "out of phase" with its subject's "life and identity". Dyson writes, "[Louis] Lomax says that Malcolm became a 'lukewarm integrationist'. [Peter] Goldman suggests that Malcolm was 'improvising', that he embraced and discarded ideological options as he went along. [Albert] Cleage and [Oba] T'Shaka hold that he remained a revolutionary black nationalist. And [James Hal] Cone asserts that he became an internationalist with a humanist bent." Marable writes that Malcolm X was a "committed internationalist" and "black nationalist" at the end of his life, not an "integrationist", noting, "what I find in my own research is greater continuity than discontinuity".

My life in particular never has stayed fixed in one position for very long. You have seen how throughout my life, I have often known unexpected drastic changes.

— Malcolm X, from The Autobiography of Malcolm X

Marable, in "Rediscovering Malcolm's Life: A Historian's Adventures in Living History", critically analyzes the collaboration that produced the Autobiography. Marable argues autobiographical "memoirs" are "inherently biased", representing the subject as he would appear with certain facts privileged, others deliberately omitted. Autobiographical narratives self-censor, reorder event chronology, and alter names. According to Marable, "nearly everyone writing about Malcolm X" has failed to critically and objectively analyze and research the subject properly. Marable suggests that most historians have assumed that the Autobiography is veritable truth, devoid of any ideological influence or stylistic embellishment by Malcolm X or Haley. Further, Marable believes the "most talented revisionist of Malcolm X, was Malcolm X", who actively fashioned and reinvented his public image and verbiage so as to increase favor with diverse groups of people in various situations.

Haley writes that during the last months of Malcolm X's life "uncertainty and confusion" about his views were widespread in Harlem, his base of operations. In an interview four days before his death Malcolm X said, "I'm man enough to tell you that I can't put my finger on exactly what my philosophy is now, but I'm flexible." Malcolm X had not yet formulated a cohesive Black ideology at the time of his assassination and, Dyson writes, was "experiencing a radical shift" in his core "personal and political understandings".

== Legacy and influence ==
Eliot Fremont-Smith, reviewing The Autobiography of Malcolm X for The New York Times in 1965, described it as "extraordinary" and said it is a "brilliant, painful, important book". Two years later, historian John William Ward wrote that the book "will surely become one of the classics in American autobiography". Bayard Rustin argued the book suffered from a lack of critical analysis, which he attributed to Malcolm X's expectation that Haley be a "chronicler, not an interpreter." Newsweek also highlighted the limited insight and criticism in The Autobiography but praised it for power and poignance. However, Truman Nelson in The Nation lauded the epilogue as revelatory and described Haley as a "skillful amanuensis". Variety called it a "mesmerizing page-turner" in 1992, and in 1998, Time named The Autobiography of Malcolm X one of ten "required reading" nonfiction books.

The Autobiography of Malcolm X has influenced generations of readers. In 1990, Charles Solomon writes in the Los Angeles Times, "Unlike many '60s icons, The Autobiography of Malcolm X, with its double message of anger and love, remains an inspiring document." Cultural historian Howard Bruce Franklin describes it as "one of the most influential books in late-twentieth-century American culture", and the Concise Oxford Companion to African American Literature credits Haley with shaping "what has undoubtedly become the most influential twentieth-century African American autobiography".

The impact of the book is seen as notably influential on the development of the Black Arts Movement. The day after Malcolm X's death, Amiri Baraka established the Black Arts Repertory Theater, which catalyzed the aesthetic progression of the movement. Writers and thinkers associated with the Black Arts movement found in the Autobiography an aesthetic embodiment of his profoundly influential qualities, namely, "the vibrancy of his public voice, the clarity of his analyses of oppression's hidden history and inner logic, the fearlessness of his opposition to white supremacy, and the unconstrained ardor of his advocacy for revolution 'by any means necessary.'"

Regarding the book, author bell hooks wrote "When I was a young college student in the early seventies, the book I read which revolutionized my thinking about race and politics was The Autobiography of Malcolm X." David Bradley adds:

She [hooks] is not alone. Ask any middle-aged socially conscious intellectual to list the books that influenced his or her youthful thinking, and he or she will most likely mention The Autobiography of Malcolm X. Some will do more than mention it. Some will say that ... they picked it up—by accident, or maybe by assignment, or because a friend pressed it on them—and that they approached the reading of it without great expectations, but somehow that book ... took hold of them. Got inside them. Altered their vision, their outlook, their insight. Changed their lives.

Max Elbaum concurs, writing that "The Autobiography of Malcolm X was without question the single most widely read and influential book among young people of all racial backgrounds who went to their first demonstration sometime between 1965 and 1968."

At the end of his tenure as the first African-American U.S. Attorney General, Eric Holder selected The Autobiography of Malcolm X when asked what book he would recommend to a young person coming to Washington, D.C.

=== Publication and sales ===
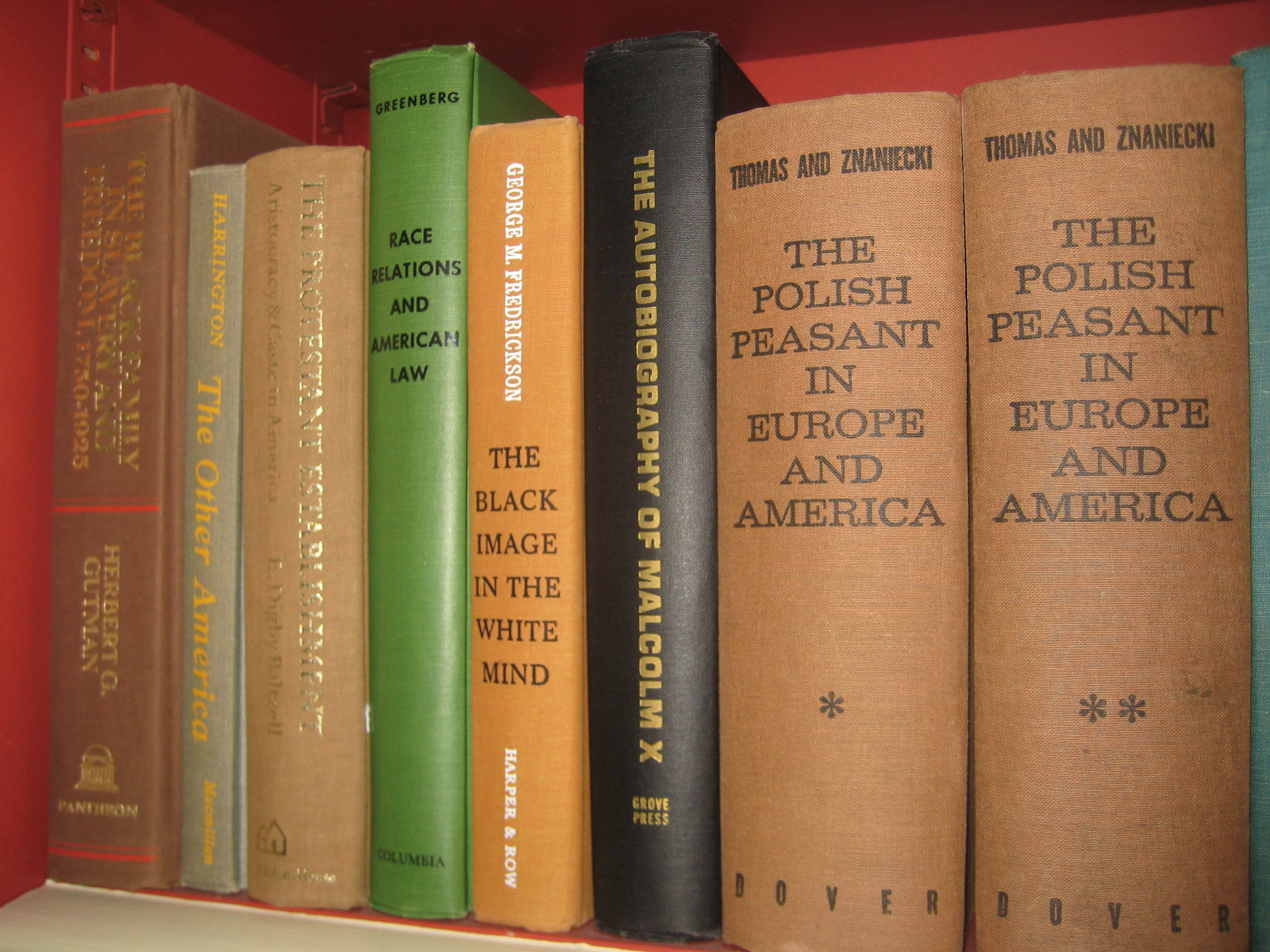
The Autobiography of Malcolm X on a bookshelf in the George W. Bush White House

Doubleday had contracted to publish The Autobiography of Malcolm X and paid a $30,000 advance to Malcolm X and Haley in 1963. In March 1965, three weeks after Malcolm X's assassination, Nelson Doubleday Jr., canceled its contract out of fear for the safety of his employees. Grove Press then published the book later that year. Since then The Autobiography of Malcolm X has sold millions of copies, Marable described Doubleday's choice as the "most disastrous decision in corporate publishing history".

The Autobiography of Malcolm X has sold well since its 1965 publication. According to The New York Times, the paperback edition sold 400,000 copies in 1967 and 800,000 copies the following year. The Autobiography entered its 18th printing by 1970. The New York Times reported that six million copies of the book had been sold by 1977. The book experienced increased readership and returned to the best-seller list in the 1990s, helped in part by the publicity surrounding Spike Lee's 1992 film Malcolm X. Between 1989 and 1992, sales of the book increased by 300%.

In 2020, Laurence Fishburne narrated it in what was Audible's first-ever unabridged audiobook recording.

=== Screenplay adaptations ===
In 1968 film producer Marvin Worth hired novelist James Baldwin to write a screenplay based on The Autobiography of Malcolm X; Baldwin was joined by screenwriter Arnold Perl, who died in 1971 before the screenplay could be finished. Baldwin developed his work on the screenplay into the book One Day, When I Was Lost: A Scenario Based on Alex Haley's "The Autobiography of Malcolm X", published in 1972. Other authors who attempted to draft screenplays include playwright David Mamet, novelist David Bradley, author Charles Fuller, and screenwriter Calder Willingham. Director Spike Lee revised the Baldwin-Perl script for his 1992 film Malcolm X.

=== Missing chapters ===
In 1992, attorney Gregory Reed bought the original manuscripts of The Autobiography of Malcolm X for $100,000 at the sale of the Haley Estate. The manuscripts included three "missing chapters", titled "The Negro", "The End of Christianity", and "Twenty Million Black Muslims", that were omitted from the original text. In a 1964 letter to his publisher, Haley had described these chapters as, "the most impact [sic] material of the book, some of it rather lava-like". Marable writes that the missing chapters were "dictated and written" during Malcolm X's final months in the Nation of Islam. In them, Marable says, Malcolm X proposed the establishment of a union of African American civic and political organizations. Marable wonders whether this project might have led some within the Nation of Islam and the Federal Bureau of Investigation to try to silence Malcolm X.

In July 2018, the Schomburg Center for Research in Black Culture acquired one of the "missing chapters", "The Negro", at auction for $7,000.

=== Editions ===
The book has been published in more than 45 editions and in many languages, including Arabic, German, French, and Indonesian. Important editions include:

- X, Malcolm; Haley, Alex (1965). The Autobiography of Malcolm X (1st hardcover ed.). New York: Grove Press. OCLC 219493184.
- X, Malcolm; Haley, Alex (1965). The Autobiography of Malcolm X (1st paperback ed.). Random House. ISBN 978-0-394-17122-7.
- X, Malcolm; Haley, Alex (1973). The Autobiography of Malcolm X (paperback ed.). Penguin Books. ISBN 978-0-14-002824-9.
- X, Malcolm; Haley, Alex (1977). The Autobiography of Malcolm X (mass market paperback ed.). Ballantine Books. ISBN 978-0-345-27139-6.
- X, Malcolm; Haley, Alex (1992). The Autobiography of Malcolm X (audio cassettes ed.). Simon & Schuster. ISBN 978-0-671-79366-1.
- X, Malcolm; Haley, Alex (2020). The Autobiography of Malcolm X (CD ed.). Brilliance Audio. ISBN 978-1-713-53069-5.

== See also ==
- The Diary of Malcolm X
- Bibliography of Malcolm X
- Bibliography of Martin Luther King Jr.

== Notes ==
a: In the first edition of The Autobiography of Malcolm X, Haley's chapter is the epilogue. In some editions, it appears at the beginning of the book.

== Sources ==
- Andrews, William, ed. (1992). African-American Autobiography: A Collection of Critical Essays (Paperback ed.). Englewood Cliffs, N.J.: Prentice Hall. ISBN 978-0-13-019845-7.
- Bloom, Harold (2008). Bloom's Guides: Alex Haley's The Autobiography of Malcolm X (Hardcover ed.). New York: Chelsea House Pub. ISBN 978-0-7910-9832-5.
- Bradley, David (1992). "Malcolm's Mythmaking" (PDF). Transition (56): 20–46. doi:10.2307/2935038. JSTOR 2935038. S2CID 156789452. Archived from the original (PDF) on February 13, 2020.
- Carson, Clayborne (1995). Malcolm X: The FBI File (Mass Market Paperback ed.). New York: Ballantine Books. ISBN 978-0-345-40009-3.
- Cone, James H. (1991). Martin & Malcolm & America: A Dream or a Nightmare. Maryknoll, N.Y.: Orbis Books. ISBN 978-0-88344-721-5.
- Davidson, D.; Samudio, J., eds. (1966). Book Review Digest (61st ed.). New York: H.W. Wilson.
- Dyson, Michael Eric (1996). Making Malcolm: The Myth and Meaning of Malcolm X (Paperback ed.). New York: Oxford University Press USA. ISBN 978-0-19-510285-7.
- Gallen, David, ed. (1995). Malcolm X: As They Knew Him (Mass Market Paperback ed.). New York: Ballantine Books. ISBN 978-0-345-40052-9.
- Greetham, David, ed. (1997). The Margins of the Text (Editorial Theory and Literary Criticism) (Hardcover ed.). Ann Arbor, Mich.: University of Michigan Press. ISBN 978-0-472-10667-7.
- Marable, Manning; Aidi, Hishaam, eds. (2009). Black Routes to Islam (Hardcover ed.). New York: Palgrave Macmillan. ISBN 978-1-4039-8400-5.
- Stone, Albert (1982). Autobiographical Occasions and Original Acts: Versions of American Identity from Henry Adams to Nate Shaw (Paperback ed.). Philadelphia: University of Pennsylvania Press. ISBN 978-0-8122-1127-6.
- Terrill, Robert E., ed. (2010). The Cambridge Companion to Malcolm X (1st Paperback ed.). Cambridge: Cambridge University Press. ISBN 978-0-521-51590-0. Archived from the original on September 23, 2015.
- Wolfenstein, Eugene Victor (1993) [1981]. The Victims of Democracy: Malcolm X and the Black Revolution (Paperback ed.). London: The Guilford Press. ISBN 978-0-89862-133-4.
- Wood, Joe, ed. (1992). Malcolm X: In Our Own Image (1st ed.). New York: St Martins Press. ISBN 978-0-312-06609-3.
- X, Malcolm; Haley, Alex (1965). The Autobiography of Malcolm X (1st ed.). New York: Grove Press. OCLC 219493184.
