= Theodore Williams =

Theodore Williams may refer to:

- Theodore J. Williams (1923–2013), American engineer
- Theodore Chickering Williams (1855–1915), American Unitarian pastor and hymnwriter
- Ted Williams (Theodore Samuel Williams, 1918–2002), American baseball player and manager
- Ted Williams (media personality) (born 1957, Theodore Fred Williams), American announcer and radio personality
