= The Diary of Malcolm X =

- Editors: Herb Boyd and Ilyasah Shabazz
- Author: Malcolm X
- Published: 2014
- Publisher: Third World Press
- Pages: 236
- ISBN: 978-0-88378-351-1

The Diary of Malcolm X is a record of the thoughts of Malcolm X during his 1964 pilgrimage to Mecca and two trips to Africa. Following a legal dispute delaying its initial publication, the Diary was released in August 2014.

== Diary ==
The diary is part of the collection of Malcolm X's papers that his daughters loaned to the Schomburg Center for Research in Black Culture, a division of the New York Public Library, in 2003. It is the private journal kept by the human rights leader during 1964, a year he largely spent traveling in Africa and the Middle East, and scholars consider it "a document of incalculable historical importance".

In 2013, Third World Press launched an Indiegogo campaign to raise money to help publish the diary, which was edited by journalist Herb Boyd and Malcolm X's daughter Ilyasah Shabazz. Publication was expected on November 15, 2013.

== Lawsuit ==
Days before the scheduled publication date, Third World Press was sued by X Legacy LLC, a corporation that represents the daughters of Malcolm X. X Legacy won a temporary restraining order, claiming Third World Press did not have the right to publish the book. Third World Press said it had a valid, signed contract. An unnamed source familiar with the suit said the plaintiffs were "probably [Ilyasah’s sisters] Attallah, Quibilah, and Gamela Shabazz", adding that of the remaining sisters, Malaak supported Ilyasah and Malikah was not involved.

At a hearing on November 22, Judge Laura Taylor Swain extended the restraining order until a hearing can be held in January 2014. Lawyers for X Legacy said that there had been reports that Third World Press was selling the diary online despite the restraining order, a claim denied by the publisher's lawyer. The publisher's lawyer argued at the hearing that they had a contract with one of Malcolm X's daughter's to publish the diary; a lawyer for X Legacy said that no contract was valid unless all six daughters agreed.

The legal disputes were resolved and the diary was published in August 2014.

== See also ==
- The Autobiography of Malcolm X
- Bibliography of Malcolm X
- Bibliography of Martin Luther King Jr.
