= Growing Up X =

2002 book by Ilyasah Shabazz with Kim McLarin

Growing Up X: A Memoir by the Daughter of Malcolm X
- Author: Ilyasah Shabazz with Kim McLarin
- Genre: Memoir
- Publisher: One World
- Publication date: 2002
- ISBN: 978-0-345-44495-0

Growing Up X: A Memoir by the Daughter of Malcolm X is a 2002 book by Ilyasah Shabazz, the third daughter of Malcolm X and Betty Shabazz. Shabazz wrote the book with Kim McLarin.

In Growing Up X, Shabazz writes about what it was like to grow up in the shadow of her father, a human rights activist who was assassinated when she was two years old. She also writes about her mother and sisters, and her early life growing up, along with her personal memories and feelings about Malcolm X. Shabazz has commented that she was nervous about releasing the book, because she did not want to ruin people's expectations of her, but has received unexpectedly great praise for her writing.
