= Jack Houghteling =

American novelist

Jack Houghteling is an American novelist and the author of Goodman (2022), Sunnyside (2023) and The Forest (2026). His work is known for its emphasis on form, voice and language. Writer Harold Rogers called Houghteling "one of the best living prose stylists."

== Early life and education ==
Houghteling grew up in Hastings-on-Hudson, New York and graduated from the Hackley School in 2010 and Claremont McKenna College in 2014. At the latter, he delivered the student commencement speech at graduation. He later earned a graduate degree from the London School of Economics in 2015 before moving to New York City.

== Works ==
Houghteling began Goodman in 2015 but then put it aside for years. It was later longlisted for the Dzanc Books Prize for Fiction.

Sunnyside is about an ex-football player from Westchester County and received acclaim. The podcast The Drunken Odyssey called it a "maximalist masterpiece," describing its style as "neomodernist." The literary journal Socrates on the Beach published an excerpt of Sunnyside, which it characterized as "sui generis” and “unlike almost any other contemporary fiction."

The Forest, Houghteling's third full-length work, was published in March 2026.

== Personal life ==
In 2018, Houghteling ran for the New York State Senate as a Democrat in Brooklyn's District 18, but never made it to the primary election ballot.

He lives in Upper Manhattan with his wife. They have two children.

== Bibliography ==
=== Books ===
- Goodman, Adelaide Books, 2022, ISBN 978-1956635867
- Sunnyside, Alien Buddha Press, 2023, ISBN 979-8375222400
- The Forest, Alien Buddha Press, 2026, ISBN 979-8273150270
