= Kim McLarin =

American writer (born 1964)

- Born: 1964 (age 61–62); United States
- Education: Duke University (BA)
- Occupation: Writer
- Children: 2
- Writing career
- Language: English
- Years active: 1998-now
- Genres: non-fiction, contemporary, short stories
- Notable works: Growing Up X: A Memoir by the Daughter of Malcolm X, Jump at the Sun
- Notable awards: 2007 Fiction Honor Book, of the Massachusetts Center for the Book, 2007 Fiction Honor Book, of the Black Caucus of the American Library Association
- Website: www.kimmclarin.com

Kim McLarin (born 1964) is an American novelist, best known for Growing Up X: A Memoir by the Daughter of Malcolm X, co-authored with Ilyasah Shabazz, and Jump at the Sun. Her works include contemporary novels, short stories and non-fiction.

== Career ==
McLarin has a bachelor's degree from Duke University.

She is a former staff writer for The New York Times, The Philadelphia Inquirer, The Greensboro News & Record and Associated Press. She is an associate professor at Emerson College in Boston.

McLarin is a regular panelist on Basic Black, Boston's longest-running weekly television program devoted exclusively to African-American themes, shown on WGBH.

McLarin has two children and lives in Boston.

== Bibliography ==
Contemporary

- Meeting of the Waters (Harper Perennial, 2001)
- Jump at the Sun (William Morrow, 2006)

Short stories

- in Black Silk (A Collection Of African American Erotica) (2002)

Non-fiction

- Taming It Down (Warner Books, 1998)
- Growing up X, co-authored with Ilyasah Shabazz (Thorndike Press, 2002)
- This Child Will Be Great, co-authored with Ellen Johnson Sirleaf (Harper/HarperCollins, 2009)
- Divorce Dog: Men, Motherhood, and Midlife (C&r Press, 2012)
- Womanish: A Grown Black Woman Speaks on Love and Life (Ig Publishing, 2019)
- James Baldwin's Another Country (Ig Publishing, 2021)

== Awards ==
Won

- 2007 Fiction Honor Book, of the Black Caucus of the American Library Association (for Jump at the Sun)

Nominated

- 2007 Hurston/Wright Legacy Award for Fiction (for Jump at the Sun)
