= Theodore Chickering Williams =

American Unitarian pastor and hymnwriter

Theodore Chickering Williams (July 2, 1855, Brookline, Massachusetts – May 6, 1915, Boston, Massachusetts) was an American Unitarian pastor and hymnwriter.

He became the first headmaster of the Hackley School, in Tarrytown, New York, in 1899. He published English translations of the works of the Latin poets Tibullus and Virgil.

He graduated from Harvard College and Harvard Divinity School.
