= A. Peter Bailey =

American journalist, author, and lecturer (born 1938)

- Born: Alfonzo Peter Bailey; February 24, 1938 (age 88); Columbus, Georgia, U.S.
- Education: Howard University
- Occupations: Journalist, author, lecturer

A. Peter Bailey (born February 24, 1938) is an American journalist, author, and lecturer. He was an associate of Malcolm X's and a member of the Organization of Afro-American Unity.

== Biography ==
Alfonzo Peter Bailey was born in Columbus, Georgia, on February 24, 1938, and raised in Tuskegee, Alabama. He was in the U.S. Army from 1956 to 1959, and attended Howard University until 1961.

In 1962, Bailey moved to Harlem. That June, he heard Malcolm X speak near Mosque No. 7. When Malcolm X left the Nation of Islam in 1964, Bailey became a founding member of his Organization of Afro-American Unity. Bailey served as editor of the group's newsletter, titled Blacklash. He was a pallbearer at Malcolm X's funeral in 1965.

Bailey served as associate editor at Ebony from 1968 to 1975. He was associate director of the Black Theatre Alliance (BTA) from 1975 to 1981, and he edited the BTA Newsletter.

In 1998, he wrote Seventh Child: A Family Memoir of Malcolm X with Malcolm X's nephew, Rodnell Collins. He wrote Revelations: The Autobiography of Alvin Ailey in 1995 based on interviews he conducted with the choreographer in the years before his 1989 death. In 2013, he wrote a memoir titled Witnessing Brother Malcolm X: The Master Teacher.

Bailey has contributed articles to The Black Collegian, Black Enterprise, Black World, Essence, Jet, The Negro Digest, the New York Daily News, and The New York Times. He writes a bimonthly column for the Trice-Edney Wire Service.

Bailey has lectured about Malcolm X at three dozen colleges and universities, and taught as an adjunct professor at Hunter College, the University of the District of Columbia, and Virginia Commonwealth University.

== Selected bibliography ==
- Harlem: Precious Memories, Great Expectations. ISBN 978-0-9726958-0-0.
- Revelations: The Autobiography of Alvin Ailey with Alvin Ailey. ISBN 978-1-55972-255-1.
- Seventh Child: A Family Memoir of Malcolm X with Rodnell P. Collins. ISBN 978-1-55972-491-3.
- Witnessing Brother Malcolm X: The Master Teacher. ISBN 978-1-62550-039-7.
