= Eugene Victor Wolfenstein =

Eugene Victor Wolfenstein (July 9, 1940 – December 15, 2010) was an American social theorist, practicing psychoanalyst, and a professor of political science at University of California, Los Angeles.

== Early life and education ==
Wolfenstein graduated with his Bachelor of Arts magna cum laude from Columbia College in 1962. He was a member of Phi Beta Kappa and the Philolexian Society.

Wolfenstein received his Master of Arts in political science in 1964 and his Ph.D. in political science in 1965 from Princeton University. Wolfenstein became a professor of political science at UCLA.

He also completed a Ph.D. in psychoanalysis from the Southern California Psychoanalytic Institute in 1984. He was the member of the faculty of the institute from 1988 to 2004. Moreover, he was in private practice from the time he received his degree up to the time of his death.

== Work ==
Wolfenstein worked in the critical theory tradition, with a focus on African American culture and social movements. In his book The Victims of Democracy: Malcolm X and the Black Revolution, he used a theory of the interaction between social classes and psychological groups to analyze white racism and the black liberation struggle. He developed a more general version of this theory in Psychoanalytic-Marxism: Groundwork (1993) and refined it further through engagement with Nietzsche’s philosophy in Inside/Outside Nietzsche: Psychoanalytic Explorations (2000). These later works add a concern with gender identity to the earlier agenda. His research is in the area of African-American narrative. A Gift of the Spirit: Reading THE SOULS OF BLACK FOLK (2007) offered a sustained reconstruction of W. E. B. Du Bois’s canonical text. A further study entitled “Talking Books: Toni Morrison Among the Ancestors” was published right before his death.

He was a professor at UCLA. At the undergraduate level, he taught the lower division Introduction to Political Theory, along with Ancient Political Theory, African-American Freedom Narratives, Malcolm X and Black Liberation, Marxist Political Theory, and an occasional seminar on Platonic Dialectic and Spiritual Liberation. At the graduate level, he focused on major works of Du Bois, Foucault, Freud, Hegel, Marx, and Nietzsche, along with the related critical literatures.

His main interests were History of Political Theory, Psychoanalytic Theory and Practice, Critical Theory, Critical Race Theory and Feminist Theory.

== Bibliography ==
- The Revolutionary Personality. Princeton, New Jersey: Princeton University Press, 1967. [Portuguese edition, 1968: Paedos Press, Buenos Aires, Argentina.]
- Personality and Politics. Los Angeles: Dickenson Press, 1969.
- The Victims of Democracy: Malcolm X and the Black Revolution. Berkeley: University of California Press, 1981 [Paperback editions: Free Association Books, 1990; Guilford Publications, 1993].
- Psychoanalytic-Marxism: Groundwork. London & New York: Free Association Books and Guilford Publications, 1993.
- Inside/Outside Nietzsche: Psychoanalytic Explorations. Ithaca, NY: Cornell University Press, 2000.
- A Gift of the Spirit: Reading the Souls of Black Folk. NY: Cornell University Press, 2007.
