= Malcolm X Memorial Foundation =

Coordinates: 41.2900°N 96.0059°W

The Malcolm X Memorial Foundation is a non-profit organization, headquartered in Omaha, Nebraska, working to perpetuate the leadership and contributions of El Hajj Malik El-Shabazz (Malcolm X) towards social justice.

Founded by Rowena Moore, the organization is located on the site of Malcolm's first home in Omaha at 3448 Pinkney Street.

== See also ==
- Bibliography of Malcolm X
- Bibliography of Martin Luther King Jr.
