= Leith Mullings =

American anthropologist (1945–2020)

- Born: Leith Patricia Mullings; April 8, 1945; Mandeville, Jamaica
- Died: December 13, 2020 (aged 75); New York City, US
- Education: Queens College, Cornell University, University of Chicago
- Scientific career
- Fields: Anthropology
- Workplaces: CUNY Graduate Center

Leith Patricia Mullings (April 8, 1945 – December 13, 2020) was a Jamaican-born author, anthropologist and professor. She was president of the American Anthropological Association from 2011–2013, and was a Distinguished Professor of Anthropology at the Graduate Center of the City University of New York. Mullings was involved in organizing for progressive social justice, racial equality and economic justice as one of the founding members of the Black Radical Congress and in her role as President of the AAA. Under her leadership, the American Anthropological Association took up the issue of academic labor rights.

Her research and writing focused on structures of inequality and resistance to them. Her research began in Africa and she wrote about traditional medicine and religion in postcolonial Ghana, as well as about women’s roles in Africa. In the U.S. her work centered on urban communities. She was recognized for this work by the Society for the Anthropology of North America, which awarded her the Prize for Distinguished Achievement in the Critical Study of North America in 1997. Mullings was working on an ethnohistory of the African Burial Ground in New York City at the time of her death.

== Early life and education ==
Both of Leith Mullings' parents are from Jamaica where she was one of triplets born April 8, 1945. After her birth her parents moved to New York City while she stayed in Jamaica and was raised by her grandmother until the age of three. Her father Hubert W. Mulling was among the first Black licensed Certified Public Accountant in New York City. Her mother, Lilieth H. Mullings was the head intensive care nurse at Queens Hospital in New York.

In 1961 Mullings studied nursing at Queens College, City University of New York where she finished a five year program with a bachelor of science in nursing from Cornell University. During her time in Queens College, she took an Introduction to Anthropology course taught by Hortense Powdermaker, influencing her decision to eventually continue in the field. In 1970, Mullings earned a Master of Arts and in 1975 a Ph.D. in anthropology from the University of Chicago.

== Career and research ==
Mullings became a lecturer of anthropology at Yale University in 1972. In 1974 she moved to Columbia University and was promoted to assistant professor in 1975 and associate professor by 1981. While teaching at Columbia, Mullings started teaching at the Graduate Center of the City University of New York. While at the Graduate Center, Mullings became a member of the Metropolitan Medical Anthropological Society. In 1983, Mullings left Columbia and began working full time at the City University of New York’s Graduate Center as a distinguished professor of anthropology.

Mulling's research focused on the consequences and resistance to inequality in the United States and other parts of the world. Using a feminist and critical race theory lens, Mullings analyzed various topics including: health disparities, kinship, gentrification, social movements, and representation. While completing her PhD at the University of Chicago, Mullings looked at the role of religion, the construction of personhood, plural medicine and the role of women in post-colonial Ghana. Her dissertation work turned into her first book, Therapy, Ideology and Social Change: Mental Health and Healing in Urban Ghana.

In the US Mullings research focused on urban communities such as Harlem, where she developed the concept of the Sojourner Syndrome. The Sojourner Syndrome applies an intersectional approach to explain the production and reproduction of power differences and health disparities focusing on the survival strategies and resiliency of by African American women, resulting in the publication of her second book, The Social Context of Reproduction in Central Harlem. Some of her more recent work included completing a manuscript on the ethnohistory of the New York City African Burial Ground with the goal of recognizing, preserving, and memorializing the site along with other Black scholars across the country.

== Sojourner Syndrome ==
"Sojourner Syndrome" describes the behavioral coping strategies Black women employ to manage the psychosocial environmental stressors they encounter. It conceptualizes the intersecting influences of racism, sexism, and stress have on Black women and the related health factors which emerge from the intersectionality.

Mullings' research in Harlem looked at the consequences of racial discrimination, and gender subordination, expressed in different ways such as environmental racism, employment and housing insecurity, and the effects that had on the health and well-being of Black women in Harlem. Mulling's found that Black people with lower socioeconomic status who lived in under-resourced, predominantly Black neighborhoods found positive, protective aspects within their neighborhood.

== Awards and recognitions ==
Mullings received many awards throughout her lifetime including the Prize for Distinguished Achievement in the Critical Studies of North America in 1997. In 2015 Mullings was named an Andrew Carnegie Fellow for her contribution to humanity. Mullings also received grants from the National Science Foundation (NSF), the Centers for Disease Control and Prevention (CDC) and the Kellogg Foundation.

== Publications ==
- 1984 Therapy, Ideology and Social Change: Mental Healing in Urban Ghana, Berkeley and Los Angeles: University of California Press.
- 1987 Cities of the United States: Studies in Urban Anthropology, editor, New York: Columbia University Press.
- 1997 On Our Own Terms: Race, Class and Gender in the Lives of African American Women, New York: Routledge.
- 2001 Stress and Resilience: The Social Context of Reproduction in Central Harlem, New York: Kluwer Academic/Plenum Publishers (with Alaka Wali).
- 2002 Freedom: A Photographic History of the African American Struggle, London: Phaidon Press. Awarded a Krazna-Krausz Foundation Book Prize (with Manning Marable).
- 2005 "Interrogating Racism: Toward an Antiracist Anthropology." Annual Review of Anthropology.
- 2006 Gender, Race, Class and Health: Intersectional Approaches, San Francisco, California: Jossey-Bass (with Amy J Schulz).
- 2009 Let Nobody Turn Us Around: An Anthology of African American Social and Political Thought from Slavery to the Present, Second Edition, Lanham, MD: Rowman and Littlefield (co-edited with Manning Marable).
- 2009 New Social Movements in the African Diaspora: Challenging Global Apartheid, New York, New York: Palgrave Macmillan (with Manning Marable).
- 2012 African Burial Ground National Monument Ethnographic Overview and Assessment: Sourcebook, New York: Ethnography Program, City University of New York Graduate School, Department of Anthropology (with Dána-Ain Davis).
- 2017 "Race Matters in Dangerous Times." NACLA Report on the Americas (with Pamela Calla and Charles R Halle).
- 2020 "Neoliberal Racism and the Movement for Black Lives in the United States." In Black and Indigenous Resistance in the Americas: From Multiculturalism to Racist Backlash, Lanham, Maryland: Rowman and Littlefield.
