= Manning Marable =

American academic (1950–2011)

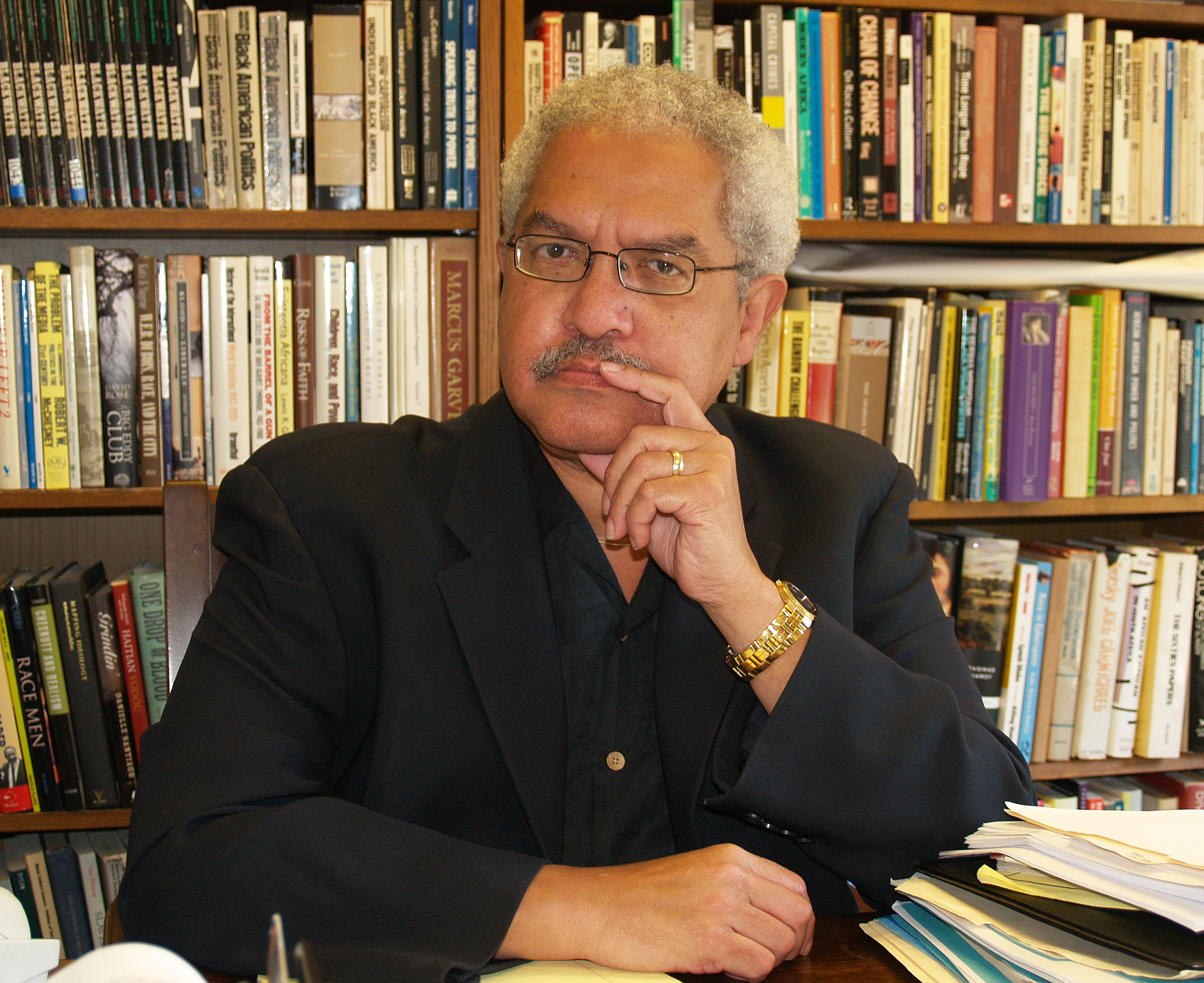
- Marable in 2007
- Born: William Manning Marable; May 13, 1950; Dayton, Ohio, U.S.
- Died: April 1, 2011 (aged 60); New York City, New York, U.S.
- Education: Earlham College; University of Wisconsin; University of Maryland
- Spouse: Hazel Ann Marable Leith Mullings (m. 1996)

William Manning Marable (May 13, 1950 – April 1, 2011) was an American professor of public affairs, history and African-American Studies at Columbia University. He founded and directed the Institute for Research in African-American Studies. He wrote several texts and was active in numerous progressive political causes.

At the time of his death, Marable had completed a biography of human rights activist Malcolm X, titled Malcolm X: A Life of Reinvention (2011). He was posthumously awarded the 2012 Pulitzer Prize for History for this work.

== Life and career ==
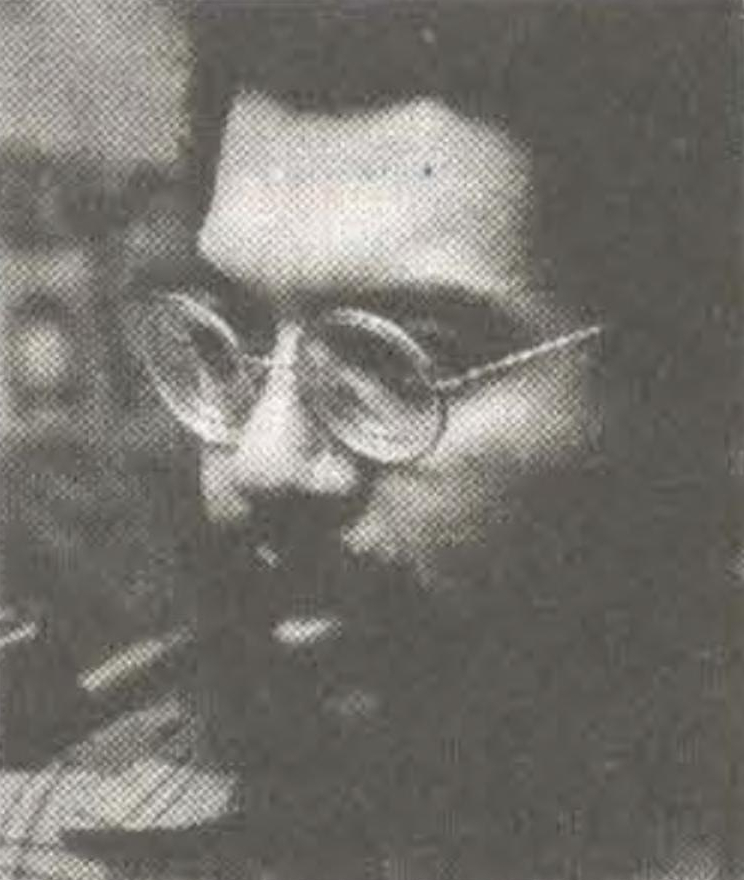
Marable c. 1982

Marable was born and raised in Dayton, Ohio. His parents were both graduates of Central State, an historically black university in nearby Wilberforce. His mother was an ordained minister and held a Ph.D. In April 1968, at the behest of his mother, 17-year-old Marable covered the funeral of Martin Luther King Jr. for Dayton's black newspaper. He graduated from Jefferson Township High School shortly thereafter.

Marable received his Bachelor of Arts degree from Earlham College (1971) and went on to earn his master's degree (1972) and Ph.D. (1976) in history, at the University of Wisconsin, and University of Maryland. Marable served on the faculty of Smith College, Tuskegee Institute, University of San Francisco, Cornell University, Fisk University, served as the founding director of the Africana and Hispanic Studies Program at Colgate University, Purdue University, Ohio State University, and University of Colorado at Boulder, where he was chairman of the Department of Black Studies. He was recruited in 1993 by Columbia University professor Eric Foner to be the founding director of Columbia's Institute for Research in African-American Studies, and was later appointed as the M. Moran Weston and Black Alumni Council Professor of African-American Studies and professor of history and public affairs.

"One thing I remember... ...is how vigorously he stressed the fact that he saw himself as both a scholar, and an activist. For him, the two vocations were inseparable... ...when he became the founding director of the Institute for Research in African American Studies (IRAAS) a few years earlier, he'd envisioned it as fundamentally a community resource. And by 'community,' he pointed out, 'I don't mean just Columbia, or even Morningside Heights.' He gestured toward the window of his 6th floor office, which afforded views to the north and the east. 'We're not in Morningside Heights! We're in Harlem!'"

— John McMillan, former graduate assistant to Marable

In 1979, Marable joined the New American Movement (NAM), an organization of veterans of the New Left who were trying to build a successor to Students for a Democratic Society. In 1982, NAM merged with Michael Harrington's Democratic Socialist Organizing Committee to form the Democratic Socialists of America (DSA), and Marable was elected as one of the new organization's vice chairs. He left the DSA in 1985 after Michael Harrington and his allies, following the lead of much of the mainstream union leadership, refused to back Jesse Jackson's insurgent campaign in 1984. Marable later joined the Committees of Correspondence for Democracy and Socialism.

Marable served as Chair of Movement for a Democratic Society (MDS). Marable served on the board of directors for the Hip-Hop Summit Action Network (HSAN), a non-profit coalition of public figures working to utilize hip-hop as an agent for social change. Marable was also a member of the New York Legislature's Amistad Commission, created to review state curriculum regarding the slave trade.

== Personal life ==
Marable was married twice, first to his Earlham classmate, Hazel Ann Marable, and then from 1996 until his death, to Leith Mullings, Distinguished Professor of Anthropology at the Graduate Center of the City University of New York.

Marable was a critic of Afrocentrism. He wrote:

Populist Afrocentrism was the perfect social theory for the upwardly mobile black petty bourgeoisie. It gave them a sense of ethnic superiority and cultural originality, without requiring the hard, critical study of historical realities. It provided a philosophical blueprint to avoid concrete struggle within the real world. ... It was, in short, only the latest theoretical construct of a politics of racial identity, a world-view designed to discuss the world but never really to change it.

It was reported in June 2004 by activist group Racism Watch that Marable had called for immediate action to be taken to end the U.S. military's use of Raphael Patai's book The Arab Mind, which Marable described as "a book full of racially charged stereotypes and generalizations." In a 2008 column, Marable endorsed Senator Barack Obama's bid for the 2008 Democratic presidential nomination.

External videos
- Tribute film shown at Marable's memorial ceremony

Marable, who was diagnosed with sarcoidosis, underwent a double lung transplant as treatment in mid-2010. Marable died of complications from pneumonia on April 1, 2011, in New York City at the age of 60.

== Malcolm X biography ==
Marable's biography of Malcolm X concluded that Malcolm X exaggerated his early criminal career, and engaged in a homosexual relationship with a white businessman when he was a teen which if true would be considered abuse rather than simply a relationship as Marable claims. However, there is no evidence for this claim and his motive for making this claim may have been to compete with the already extremely popular book The Autobiography of Malcolm X which Time Magazine listed as one of the most influential books. He also concluded that some of the killers of Malcolm X are still alive and were never charged, which helped the author appear less biased.

Critics of the biography contend that the focus on Marable's discussion of Malcolm's potential same-sex relationships, about three sentences long in a 592-page book, overlooks more important political statements Marable makes about Malcolm's underlying lifelong commitment to revolutionary Pan Africanism.

Malcolm X: A Life of Reinvention was nominated for the National Book Award, and The New York Times ranked it among the 10 Best Books of 2011. It was one of three nominees for the inaugural Andrew Carnegie Medal for Excellence in Nonfiction (2012) presented by the American Library Association for the best adult non-fiction. It was awarded the Pulitzer Prize for History in 2012.

== Writings ==
- How Capitalism Underdeveloped Black America (1983), ISBN 978-0-89608-165-9
- African and Caribbean Politics: From Kwame Nkrumah to Maurice Bishop (1987), ISBN 978-0-86091-884-4
- Race, Reform and Rebellion (1991), ISBN 978-0-87805-493-0
- The Crisis of Color and Democracy: Essays on Race, Class, and Power (1992), ISBN 978-0-96288-382-8
- Beyond Black and White: Transforming African American Politics (1995), ISBN 978-1-85984-049-8
- Speaking Truth to Power: Essays on Race, Resistance, and Radicalism (1996), ISBN 978-0-8133-8828-1
- Black Liberation in Conservative America (1997), ISBN 978-0-89608-559-6
- Black Leadership (1998), ISBN 978-0-231-10746-4
- Let Nobody Turn Us Around (2000), ISBN 978-0-8476-9930-8
- Freedom: A Photographic History of the African American Struggle (with Leith Mullings and Sophie Spencer-Wood, 2002), ISBN 978-0-7148-4270-7
- The Great Wells of Democracy: The Meaning of Race in American Life (2003), ISBN 978-0-465-04394-1
- W. E. B. DuBois: Black Radical Democrat (2005), ISBN 978-1-59451-019-9
- The Autobiography of Medgar Evers (2005, with Myrlie Evers-Williams), ISBN 0-465-02177-8
- Malcolm X: A Life of Reinvention (2011), ISBN 978-0-670-02220-5
- Living Black History: How Reimagining the African-American Past Can Remake America's Racial Future (2011), ISBN 9780465043958
- The Portable Malcolm X Reader (2013, with Garrett Felber), ISBN 978-0-14-310694-4
