= Bibliography of Malcolm X =

Malcolm X
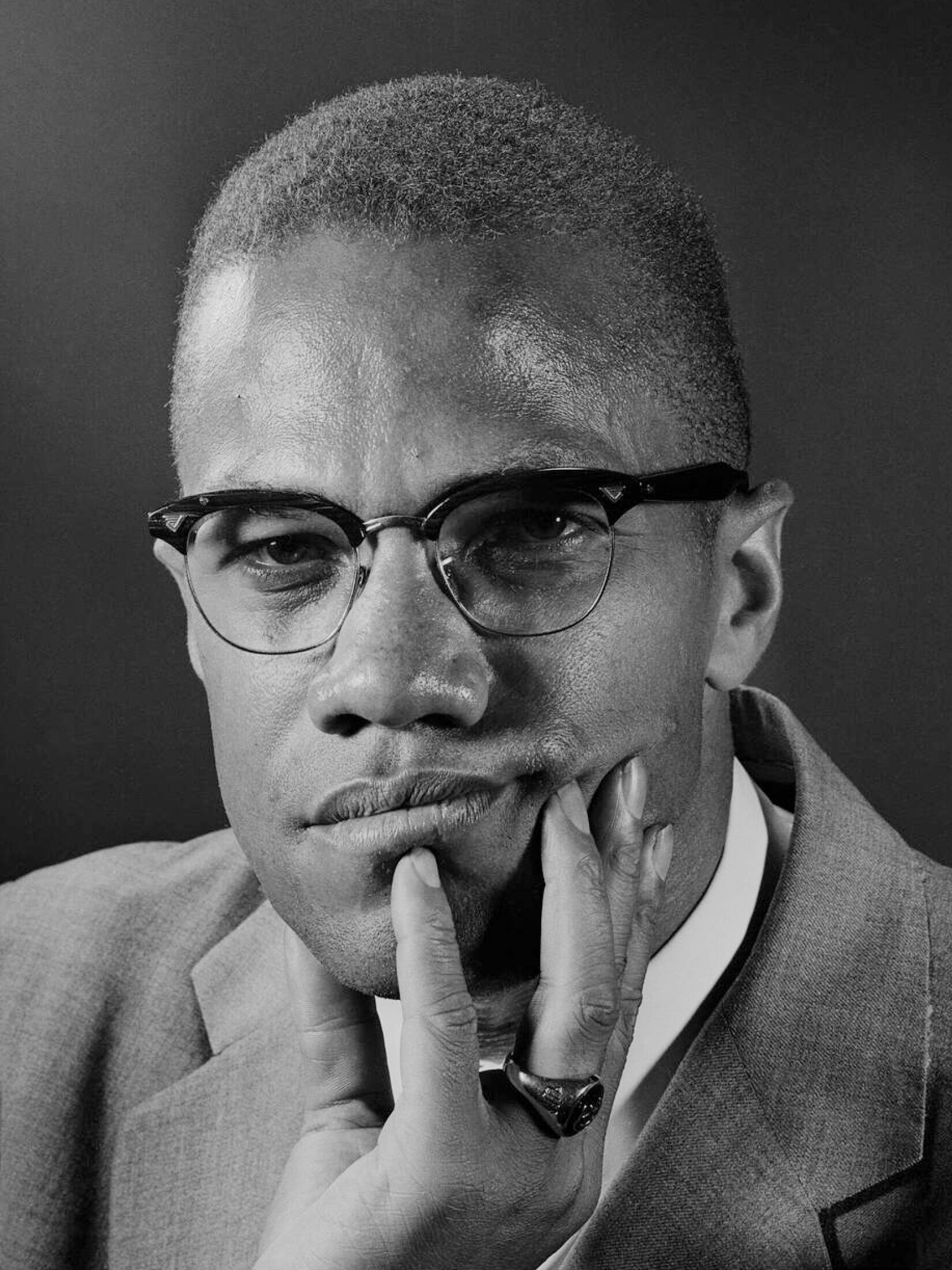
- Malcolm X in 1964
- Born: Malcolm Little; May 19, 1925; Omaha, Nebraska, U.S.
- Died: February 21, 1965 (aged 39); New York City, U.S.
- Cause of death: Assassination by gunshots
- Occupations: Minister; activist
- Organizations: Nation of Islam; Muslim Mosque, Inc.; Organization of Afro-American Unity
- Movement: Black nationalism; Pan-Africanism; Islamism
- Spouse: Betty Shabazz (m. 1958)

This is a select bibliography of academic level books and journal articles about the life and work of Malcolm X and the historical context of his life and work.

Malcolm X (born Malcolm Little, later el-Hajj Malik el-Shabazz; (Note: Arabic: الْحَجّ مَالِك ٱلشَّبَازّ, romanized: Al-Ḥajj Mālik ash-Shabāzz.) May 19, 1925 – February 21, 1965) was an African American revolutionary, civil rights activist, and Muslim minister who was a prominent figure during the civil rights movement until his assassination in 1965. He discovered the new religious movement the Nation of Islam (NOI) while in prison and served as a spokesperson from 1952 until he transitioned to Sunni Islam in 1964. He is often regarded as one of the most significant Muslim figures in the history of the United States. A controversial figure accused of preaching violence, Malcolm X is also a celebrated figure within the African American community for his pursuit of racial justice and equality.

Works listed here are cited in the notes or bibliographies of scholarly sources. Each is published by an academic or major press, written by a recognized expert, or substantially reviewed in scholarly journals; borderline cases are omitted. A selection of primary sources are included. Many of the books below carry their own bibliographies; see the Further reading section for other bibliographies, and the External links section for historical sites, academic sites, and museums.

Citations follow APA style. (Note: Entries are in plain text APA 7 format without templates; templates are used only for reviews and notes.) Book have citations to academic journal or mainstream published reviews when available. For books only partly about the subject, relevant chapter or section titles are provided when useful and available. Translators of the original-language edition are included when possible. In cases where a title or name has appeared with more than one English spelling, the most recent published form is used and a footnote documents any earlier title under which the work appeared.

== Biographies ==
- Ball, J., & Burroughs, T. S. (Eds.). (2012). A lie of reinvention: Correcting Manning Marable's Malcolm X. Black Classic Press.
- DeCaro, L. A. Jr. (1996). On the side of my people: A religious life of Malcolm X. New York University Press. doi:10.18574/nyu/9780814721001.001.0001
- Goldman, P. (2013). The death and life of Malcolm X. University of Illinois Press.
- Joseph, P. E. (2020). The sword and the shield: The revolutionary lives of Malcolm X and Martin Luther King Jr. Basic Books. (Note: Also listed as The revolutionary lives of Malcolm X and Martin Luther King Jr.)
- Marable, M. (2011). Malcolm X: A life of reinvention. Viking.
- Payne, L., & Payne, T. (2020). The dead are arising: The life of Malcolm X. Liveright.
- Perry, B. (1991). Malcolm: The life of a man who changed Black America. Station Hill Press.

== Family ==
- Collins, R. P., & Bailey, A. P. (1998). Seventh child: A family memoir of Malcolm X. Carol Publishing Group.
- McDuffie, E. S. (2016). The diasporic journeys of Louise Little: Grassroots Garveyism, the Midwest, and community feminism. Women, Gender, and Families of Color, 4(2), 146–170. doi:10.5406/womgenfamcol.4.2.0146
- Rickford, R. J. (2003). Betty Shabazz: A remarkable story of survival and faith before and after Malcolm X. Sourcebooks.
- Shabazz, I., & McLarin, K. (2002). Growing up X. One World.
- Tubbs, A. M. (2021). The three mothers: How the mothers of Martin Luther King Jr., Malcolm X, and James Baldwin shaped a nation. Flatiron Books.

== The Nation of Islam ==
- Berg, H. (2009). Elijah Muhammad and Islam. New York University Press.
- Clegg, C. A., III. (1997). An original man: The life and times of Elijah Muhammad. St. Martin's Press.
- Curtis, E. E., IV. (2006). Black Muslim religion in the Nation of Islam, 1960–1975. University of North Carolina Press. doi:10.5149/9780807877449_curtis
- DeCaro, L. A. Jr. (1998). Malcolm and the cross: The Nation of Islam, Malcolm X, and Christianity. New York University Press. doi:10.18574/nyu/9780814738306.001.0001
- Essien-Udom, E. U. (1962). Black nationalism: A search for an identity in America. University of Chicago Press.
- Gardell, M. (1996). In the name of Elijah Muhammad: Louis Farrakhan and the Nation of Islam. Duke University Press.
- Lincoln, C. E. (1961). The Black Muslims in America. Beacon Press.
- Taylor, U. Y. (2017). The promise of patriarchy: Women and the Nation of Islam. University of North Carolina Press. doi:10.5149/northcarolina/9781469633930.001.0001

== The civil rights movement in the 1960s ==
- Carson, C. (1981). In struggle: SNCC and the Black awakening of the 1960s. Harvard University Press.
- Chafe, W. H. (1980). Civilities and civil rights: Greensboro, North Carolina, and the Black struggle for freedom. Oxford University Press.
- Dittmer, J. (1994). Local people: The struggle for civil rights in Mississippi. University of Illinois Press.
- Graham, H. D. (1990). The civil rights era: Origins and development of national policy, 1960–1972. Oxford University Press.
- Hall, J. D. (2005). The long civil rights movement and the political uses of the past. Journal of American History, 91(4), 1233–1263. JSTOR 3660172
- Lawson, S. F. (1991). Running for freedom: Civil rights and Black politics in America since 1941. McGraw-Hill.
- Meier, A., & Rudwick, E. (1973). CORE: A study in the civil rights movement, 1942–1968. Oxford University Press.
- Morris, A. D. (1984). The origins of the civil rights movement: Black communities organizing for change. Free Press.
- Payne, C. M. (1995). I've got the light of freedom: The organizing tradition and the Mississippi freedom struggle. University of California Press.
- Sitkoff, H. (1981). The struggle for Black equality, 1954–1980. Hill and Wang.

== Topical ==
- Carew, J. R. (1994). Ghosts in our blood: With Malcolm X in Africa, England, and the Caribbean. Lawrence Hill Books.
- Condit, C. M., & Lucaites, J. L. (1993). Malcolm X and the limits of the rhetoric of revolutionary dissent. Journal of Black Studies, 23(3), 291–313. doi:10.1177/002193479302300301
- Cone, J. H. (1991). Martin & Malcolm & America: A dream or a nightmare. Orbis Books.
- Evanzz, K. (1992). The Judas factor: The plot to kill Malcolm X. Thunder's Mouth Press.
- Felber, G. (2015). "Harlem is the Black world": The Organization of Afro-American Unity at the grassroots. The Journal of African American History, 100(2), 199–225. doi:10.5323/jafriamerhist.100.2.0199
- Felber, G. (2018). "Shades of Mississippi": The Nation of Islam's prison organizing, the carceral state, and the Black freedom struggle. Journal of American History, 105(1), 71–95. doi:10.1093/jahist/jay008
- Felber, G. (2020). Those who know don't say: The Nation of Islam, the Black freedom movement, and the carceral state. University of North Carolina Press. doi:10.5149/northcarolina/9781469653822.001.0001
- Flick, H., & Powell, L. (1988). Animal imagery in the rhetoric of Malcolm X. Journal of Black Studies, 18(4), 435–451. doi:10.1177/002193478801800403
- Houck, D. W. (1993). "By any means necessary": Re-reading Malcolm X's Mecca conversion. Communication Studies, 44(3–4), 285–298. doi:10.1080/10510979309368401
- Sales, W. W. Jr. (1994). From civil rights to Black liberation: Malcolm X and the Organization of Afro-American Unity. South End Press.
- Sawyer, M. E. (2020). Black minded: The political philosophy of Malcolm X. Pluto Press. JSTOR j.ctvxrpzt9
- Terrill, R. (2001). Protest, prophecy, and prudence in the rhetoric of Malcolm X. Rhetoric & Public Affairs, 4(1), 25–53. doi:10.1353/rap.2001.0016
- Terrill, R. E. (Ed.). (2010). The Cambridge companion to Malcolm X. Cambridge University Press. doi:10.1017/ccol9780521515900

== Historiography and memory ==
- Corrigan, L. M. (2017). 50 years later: Commemorating the life and death of Malcolm X. Howard Journal of Communications, 28(2), 144–159. doi:10.1080/10646175.2017.1288179
- Daulatzai, S. (2012). Black star, crescent moon: The Muslim international and Black freedom beyond America. University of Minnesota Press. doi:10.5749/minnesota/9780816675852.001.0001
- Dyson, M. E. (1995). Making Malcolm: The myth and meaning of Malcolm X. Oxford University Press. doi:10.1093/oso/9780195092356.001.0001
- Felber, G. (2010). "A writer is what I want, not an interpreter": Alex Haley and Malcolm X—Conceiving the autobiographical self and the struggle for authorship. Souls, 12(1), 33–53. doi:10.1080/10999940903571304
- Franklin, V. P. (2015). Introduction—The legacy of Malcolm X: Black nationalism, internationalism, and transnationalism. The Journal of African American History, 100(2), 195–198. doi:10.5323/jafriamerhist.100.2.0195
- Lawson, S. F. (1991). Freedom then, freedom now: The historiography of the civil rights movement. The American Historical Review, 96(2), 456–471. JSTOR 2163219
- Rodriguez, D. (2021). Reclaiming Malcolm X: Epideictic discourse and African-American rhetoric. Rhetoric Review, 40(2), 153–166. doi:10.1080/07350198.2021.1883823
- Strickland, W. L. (2012). Remembering Malcolm: A personal critique of Manning Marable's non-definitive biography of Malcolm X. The Black Scholar, 42(1), 25–35. doi:10.5816/blackscholar.42.1.0025
- Wood, J. (Ed.). (1992). Malcolm X: In our own image. St. Martin's Press.
- Zhang, J. (2025). Malcolm X, Maoist China, and Black (inter)nationalism. The Black Scholar, 55(3–4), 26–36. doi:10.1080/00064246.2025.2545741

== Primary sources and speeches ==
- Malcolm X, & Haley, A. (1965). The autobiography of Malcolm X. Grove Press.

=== Collections ===
- Clarke, J. H. (Ed.). (1969). Malcolm X: The man and his times. Macmillan.
- Malcolm X. (1965a). Malcolm X speaks: Selected speeches and statements (G. Breitman, Ed.). Merit Publishers.
- Malcolm X. (1965b). Two speeches by Malcolm X. Pathfinder Press.
- Malcolm X. (1967). Malcolm X on Afro-American history. Merit Publishers.
- Malcolm X. (1968). The speeches of Malcolm X at Harvard (A. C. Epps, Ed.). Morrow.
- Malcolm X. (1970). By any means necessary: Speeches, interviews, and a letter by Malcolm X (G. Breitman, Ed.). Pathfinder Press.
- Malcolm X. (1971). The end of White world supremacy: Four speeches by Malcolm X (B. Karim, Ed.). Merlin House.
- Malcolm X. (1989). The last speeches (B. Perry, Ed.). Pathfinder Press.
- Malcolm X. (1992). February 1965: The final speeches (S. Clark, Ed.). Pathfinder Press.
- Malcolm X. (2013). The Diary of Malcolm X: 1964 (H. Boyd & I. Shabazz, Eds.). Third World Press.
- Marable, M., & Felber, G. (Eds.). (2013). The portable Malcolm X reader. Penguin Classics.

=== Individual speeches ===
- Malcolm X. (1960). Harlem Freedom Rally. Harlem, New York, NY.
- Malcolm X. (1960, May 5). Address at Queens College. Queens College, New York, NY.
- Malcolm X. (1961, March 24). The American Negro: Problems and solutions. Harvard Law School Forum, Cambridge, MA.
- Malcolm X. (1961, May 11). Address at Brown University. Sayles Auditorium, Brown University, Providence, RI.
- Malcolm X. (1962, May 22). Who taught you to hate yourself? Los Angeles, CA.
- Malcolm X. (1962, October 20). Address at Yale University. Yale University, New Haven, CT.
- Malcolm X. (1963, January 23). Twenty million Black people in a political, economic, and mental prison. Erickson Kiva, Michigan State University, East Lansing, MI.
- Malcolm X. (1963, June). The Black revolution. Abyssinian Baptist Church, New York, NY.
- Malcolm X. (1963, September). The old Negro and the new Negro.
- Malcolm X. (1963, October 11). Address at the University of California, Berkeley. University of California, Berkeley, Berkeley, CA.
- Malcolm X. (1963, October 22). Address at Wayne State University. Wayne State University, Detroit, MI.
- Malcolm X. (1963, November 10). Message to the grass roots. Northern Negro Grass Roots Leadership Conference, King Solomon Baptist Church, Detroit, MI.
- Malcolm X. (1963, November 20). Address at Columbia University. Columbia University, New York, NY.
- Malcolm X. (1963, December 4). God's judgment of White America. New York, NY.
- Malcolm X. (1964, March 12). A declaration of independence [Press conference]. New York, NY.
- Malcolm X. (1964, March 18). Address at the Leverett House Forum. Leverett House, Harvard University, Cambridge, MA.
- Malcolm X. (1964, April 3). The ballot or the bullet. Cory Methodist Church, Cleveland, OH.
- Malcolm X. (1964, April 8). The Black revolution. Militant Labor Forum, New York, NY.
- Malcolm X. (1964, April 12). The ballot or the bullet. King Solomon Baptist Church, Detroit, MI.
- Malcolm X. (1964, May 13). Address at the University of Ghana. University of Ghana, Accra, Ghana.
- Malcolm X. (1964, May 29). The Harlem "hate-gang" scare. Militant Labor Forum, New York, NY.
- Malcolm X. (1964, June 28). Address at the founding rally of the Organization of Afro-American Unity. Audubon Ballroom, New York, NY.
- Malcolm X. (1964, July 5). Address at the second rally of the Organization of Afro-American Unity. New York, NY.
- Malcolm X. (1964, July 17). Appeal to the Organization of African Unity summit conference. Cairo, Egypt.
- Malcolm X. (1964, November 29). Address at the Organization of Afro-American Unity homecoming rally. New York, NY.
- Malcolm X. (1964, December 3). Address to the Oxford Union. Oxford Union, Oxford, England.
- Malcolm X. (1964, December 12). Address at the HARYOU-ACT forum. Harlem, New York, NY.
- Malcolm X. (1964, December 13). Address at the Audubon Ballroom. Audubon Ballroom, New York, NY.
- Malcolm X. (1964, December 16). Address at the Harvard Law School Forum. Harvard Law School, Cambridge, MA.
- Malcolm X. (1964, December 20). Introduction of Fannie Lou Hamer at the Audubon Ballroom. Audubon Ballroom, New York, NY.
- Malcolm X. (1965, January 1). To Mississippi youth. Hotel Theresa, New York, NY.
- Malcolm X. (1965, January 7). Prospects for freedom in 1965. Militant Labor Forum, New York, NY.
- Malcolm X. (1965, January 24). On Afro-American history. New York, NY.
- Malcolm X. (1965, February 4). Address at Brown Chapel AME Church. Brown Chapel AME Church, Selma, AL.
- Malcolm X. (1965, February 8). Address to the first congress of the Council of African Organisations. London, England.
- Malcolm X. (1965, February 11). Address at the London School of Economics. London School of Economics, London, England.
- Malcolm X. (1965, February 14). After the firebombing. Ford Auditorium, Detroit, MI.
- Malcolm X. (1965, February 15). There's a worldwide revolution going on. Audubon Ballroom, New York, NY.
- Malcolm X. (1965, February 16). Not just an American problem, but a world problem. Corn Hill Methodist Church, Rochester, NY.
- Malcolm X. (1965, February 18). The Black revolution and its effect upon the Negroes of the Western Hemisphere. Columbia University, New York, NY.

=== Interviews ===
- Malcolm X. (1964, June 2). Interview with Robert Penn Warren [Audio recording, 2 tapes]. Who Speaks for the Negro? The Robert Penn Warren Civil Rights Oral History Project, Vanderbilt University, Nashville, TN.

=== Archival collections ===
- The Malcolm X collection: papers, 1948–1965 – Schomburg Center for Research in Black Culture, Manuscripts, Archives and Rare Books Division, New York Public Library
- The Malcolm X collection: photographs, 1950s–1964 – Schomburg Center, Photographs and Prints Division
- Malcolm X manuscripts, circa 1963–1965 – Schomburg Center; drafts and an unpublished chapter of The Autobiography of Malcolm X
- Malcolm X audio and moving image collection, circa 1950s–1983 – Schomburg Center, Moving Image and Recorded Sound Division

== See also ==
- Bibliography of Martin Luther King Jr.
