= The Other America (speech) =

Speeches delivered by Martin Luther King Jr.

"The Other America" is a speech by Martin Luther King Jr. delivered in various forms at least five times from 1967 until 1968. It was first given in its recognized form on Friday, April 14, 1967, at the Memorial Auditorium at Stanford University, where it was filmed and recorded by KQED-TV. King delivered three well-known variations that have transcriptions, at Stanford, Hunter College, and Grosse Pointe High School. In the original 49-minute speech, King addresses the concept of Two Americas, the history of the civil rights movement, the long-term problem of racism in the United States, arguments for and against addressing it, a proposal for a comprehensive anti-poverty program with a guaranteed minimum income, and closes out the speech by touching briefly on his opposition to the Vietnam War.

Historian Sylvie Laurent notes the speech draws influence from writer and activist Michael Harrington and economist John Kenneth Galbraith. The title and the theme of King's speech was influenced by Harrington, a democratic socialist who had once worked on several civil rights campaigns with King. Galbraith, a post-Keynesian economist who took an institutionalist approach, also informed King's speech, with both of their ideas evolving into key positions taken by King's Poor People's Campaign (PPC) a year later. King eventually developed a loose alliance with Robert F. Kennedy to promote the PPC, with three of the ideas originally found in the speech becoming PPC campaign policy proposals by March 1968: a call for a guaranteed annual income, a need for a public works program, and an end to the Vietnam War.

== Background ==
Almost a century after the end of slavery in the United States, violence and racial injustice by whites against Black Americans in the 1950s was still occurring, with murders, lynchings, and executions a continuing threat. After Brown v. Board of Education overturned racial segregation in 1954, it took years to implement in the Deep South where Jim Crow laws persisted. Baptist minister Martin Luther King Jr. used nonviolence to lead a movement to dismantle Jim Crow, starting with the Montgomery bus boycott in 1955. He became the president of the Southern Christian Leadership Conference (SCLC) in 1957. The Cold War period of anti-communism led the Federal Bureau of Investigation (FBI) under J. Edgar Hoover to monitor King in the early 1960s.

Success finally came with the passage of the Civil Rights Act of 1964 and the Voting Rights Act of 1965. But even with the end of legalized segregation, poverty, unemployment, and institutional racism persisted. By 1966, after white attacks on the Chicago Freedom Movement and James Meredith in the March Against Fear, nonviolence as a primary strategy began to lose ground to young radicals and black power factions who believed King was out of touch. Meanwhile, King believed a national solution was needed, as programs like the Great Society were not producing results for most Black Americans. King began to oppose the Vietnam War outright by early 1967, directly criticizing the role of the United States, a position which severed his ties with the Johnson administration. King now shifted his focus towards a multiracial movement, calling for economic justice, income security, full employment, and housing for all Americans.

== Speeches ==
=== Stanford ===
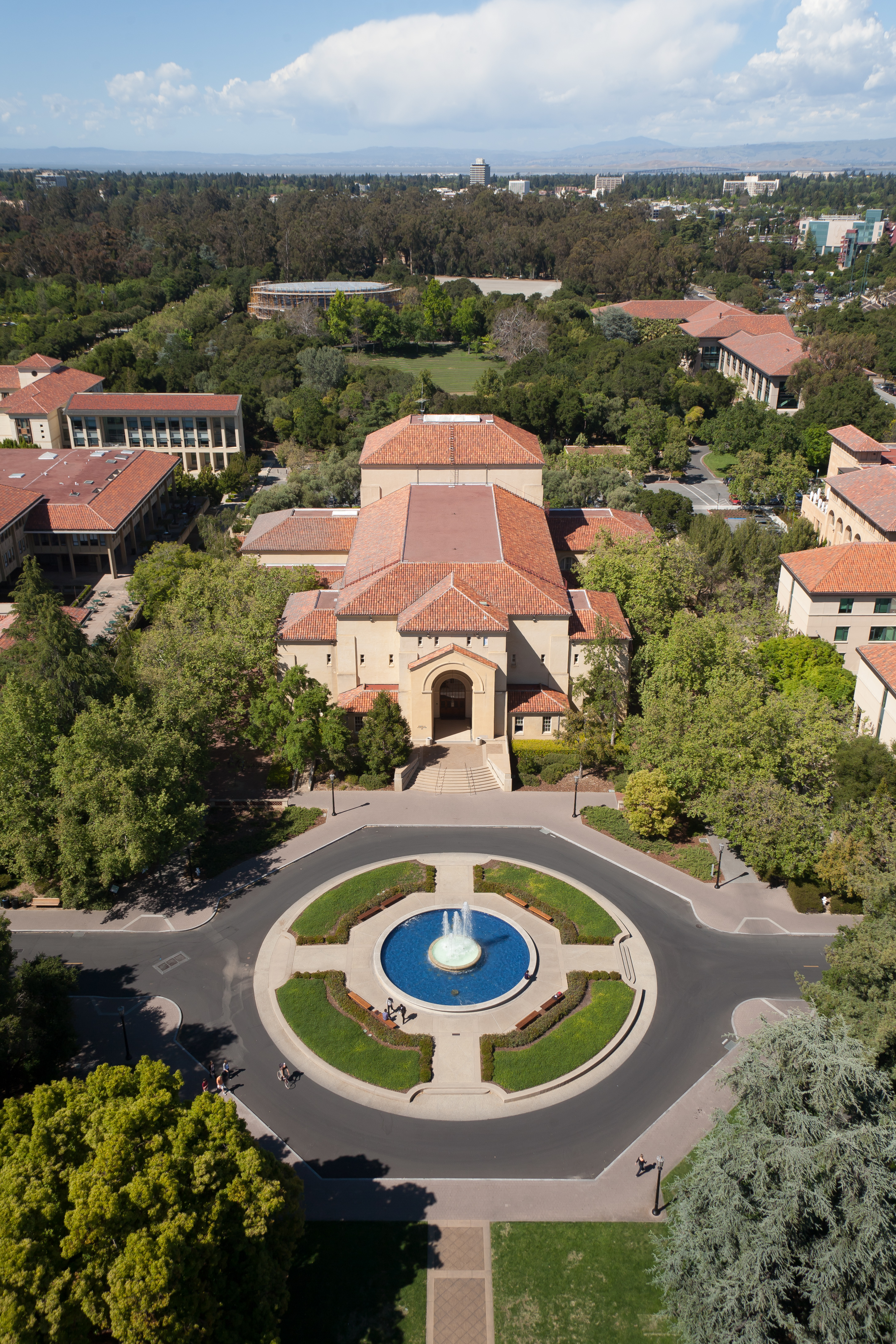
Stanford Memorial Auditorium

During his lifetime, King delivered two speeches on the Stanford University campus. The first was the keynote address at the Western States Civil Rights Conference, held at the Stanford Memorial Auditorium on April 23, 1964. Three years later, on Friday afternoon, April 14, 1967, he returned to the same venue to deliver "The Other America". Both speeches are commemorated with a wall plaque near the auditorium's entrance.

King flew in to the San Francisco Airport from Los Angeles, arriving an hour late due to a flight delay. Because of the time constraints, King was taken directly to the auditorium, where he stepped out of the car and on to the stage. After a brief introduction by Rev. B. Davie Napier, dean of the chapel, King gave a mostly extemporaneous speech to an audience of 1,800 people, the majority of whom were students, for approximately 49 minutes. The crowd was polite, and King received two standing ovations. An overflow crowd of 100 listened outside over loudspeakers. One man was arrested at the scene for disorderly conduct.

==== Content ====
King begins by addressing the problem of poverty and racial and economic inequality. He describes what he calls the "Two Americas", where white people prosper in one America while Black Americans live "in rat-infested, vermin-filled slums" in the other. In this other America, Black children are taught that they are inferior to whites. King summarizes the problem as one of race, poverty, and misery, describing the harsh economic conditions of Black Americans, their mass unemployment, and housing discrimination.

He notes that the struggle for civil rights has now shifted from ending the everyday humiliation of segregation, a fight for basic decency, to one of true equality, a position that many white supporters of the movement seem unwilling to accept. King discusses how racism goes beyond prejudice, as a belief in the inferiority of other people, an idea at the root of those who support genocide. He spends time discussing the white backlash to progress in the struggle for civil rights, noting historically that for every advance, the country often takes a step back. King provides numerous examples from Black history illustrating this problem, such as the failed promise of land to native-born Black Americans in the Reconstruction era, while white European immigrants received land and other benefits denied to Blacks.

Throughout American history, King maintains, Black Americans were denied the same rights as whites. And when they do finally achieve some small measure of progress, enforcement of their newfound rights is minimal to nonexistent. King condemns those who would engage in race riots, but recognizes that "a riot is the language of the unheard", a cry of desperation for justice after it is repeatedly ignored.

King then addresses three major arguments the civil rights movement faces: those of time, legislation, and the bootstrap metaphor. Those who claim the time is not right to enact major social changes betray a kind of non-neutrality that is hostile to civil rights. "The time is always right to do right", King argues. Addressing the argument against civil rights legislation, he notes that some say morality cannot be legislated and that people must be changed by converting their hearts. King counters that legislation allows behavior to be moderated: "Even though it may be true that the law cannot make a man love me, it can restrain him from lynching me."

I submit this afternoon that we can end poverty in the United States. Our nation has the resources to do it… The question is, whether our nation has the will.

— Martin Luther King Jr., April 14, 1967.

Finally, to address the bootstrap metaphor, King says that he is often told that Black people should just help themselves and solve their own problems in their communities, as other white immigrant groups have done. King counters this notion by noting that Black Americans were the only people who were forced to come to the country more than three centuries ago and are the only group that was enslaved and discriminated against because of the color of their skin. No other group has been treated this way in the United States, King argues. He then proposes a guaranteed minimum income for all Americans as a way to partly address the economic conditions in the Black community.

King briefly touches upon the war in Vietnam to great applause, noting that it harms the lives of American soldiers and Vietnamese children alike and dilutes the efforts of the Great Society by wasting money abroad instead of using those resources at home, where they are most needed. King observes, "if we can spend $35 billion a year to fight an ill-considered war in Vietnam, and $20 billion to put a man on the Moon, our nation can spend billions of dollars to put God's children on their own two feet right here on earth." He closes the speech with a brief homily, expressing optimism that the future will be brighter and that justice will eventually prevail.

=== Hunter College ===
Almost a year later, the Kerner Commission, set up to investigate race riots in the summer of 1967, released their final report in February 1968. Their conclusions were aligned with the theme of King's "The Other America" speech, finding that the "nation is moving toward two societies, one black, one white—separate and unequal." A month later, King delivered a variation of the original speech to a mostly Black audience as part of his main address at the 18th annual "Salute to Freedom" at Hunter College in New York, on March 10, 1968.

The fundraising event, attended by more than 2000 people affiliated with Local 1199, represented healthcare workers for the Drug and Hospital Union, the Retail, Wholesale and Department Store Union (RWDSU), and the American Federation of Labor and Congress of Industrial Organizations (AFL-CIO). Local 1199 was known for its high representation of people of color, including Black and Puerto Rican members. It is believed that this was part of King's larger strategy of building a multiracial coalition for his Poor People's Campaign.

=== Grosse Pointe High School ===
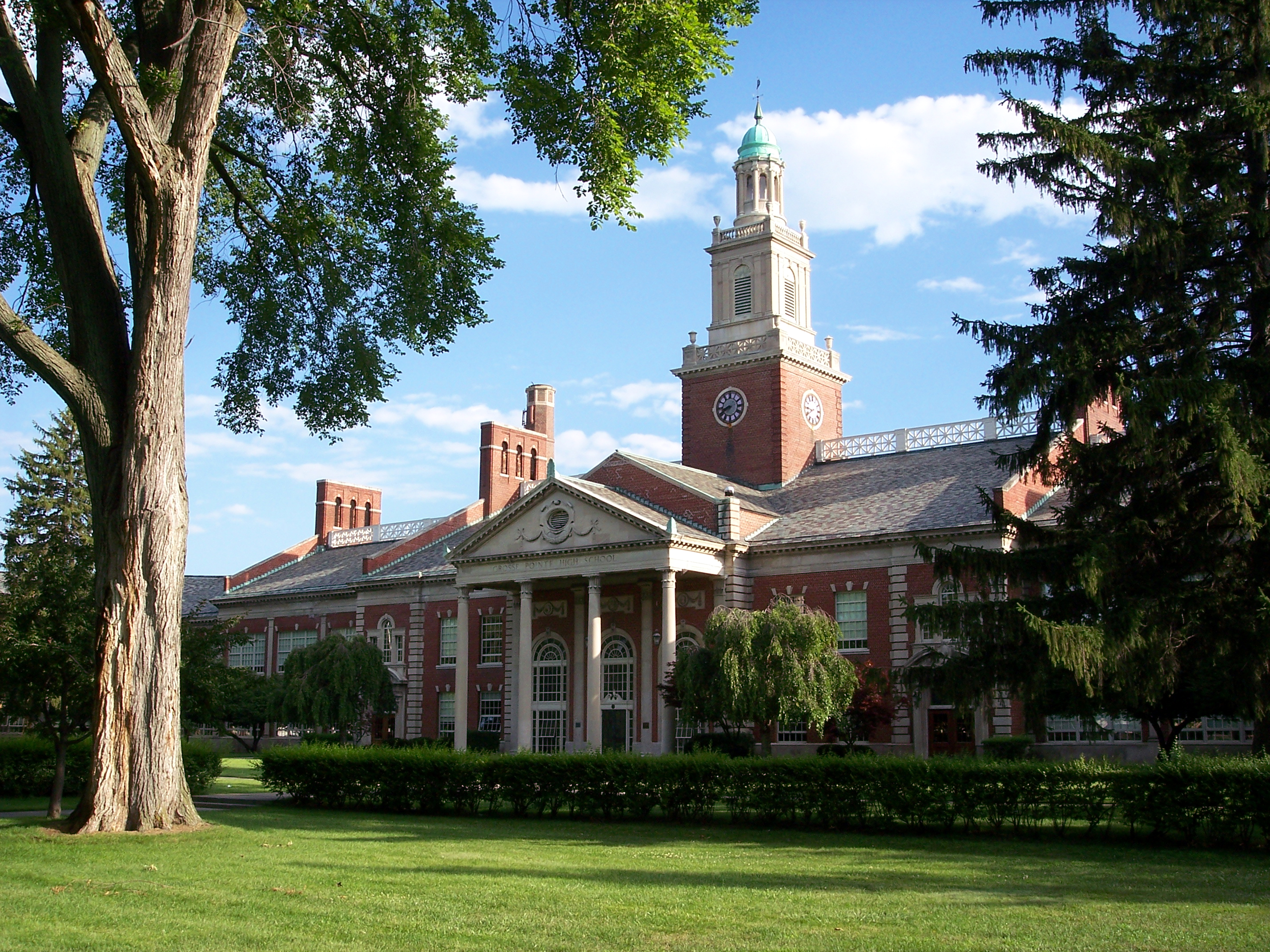
Grosse Pointe High School

Four days after speaking at Hunter College, King delivered another variation of "The Other America" speech, this time at Grosse Pointe High School. The Grosse Pointe Human Relations Council, a citizens' group concerned about housing discrimination in Grosse Pointe Farms, Michigan, had invited King to speak to their community. On Thursday, March 14, 1968, King addressed a crowd of 2,500 people in the high school gymnasium.

From the beginning, the event was marred by approximately 150 protesters from different factions who carried anti-communist and religious signs and chanted "Commie go home!" outside the venue. Inside the gymnasium, King's speech was repeatedly interrupted by hecklers, one of whom shouted, "King, you're a traitor!" At one point, fireworks were set off, frightening the crowd. The Ku Klux Klan also left recruitment literature on the windshields of cars parked for the event. King told the media that this was the first time he had witnessed such organized opposition.

== Influences and impact ==
=== Michael Harrington ===
Writer Michael Harrington, originally a member of the Catholic Worker Movement, was a political ally of Bayard Rustin and first began working with him on civil rights campaigns in the mid to late 1950s, around the time of the Montgomery bus boycotts. Harrington first heard King speak in 1957 in his "Give Us the Ballot" speech at the Prayer Pilgrimage for Freedom in Washington, D.C. He began working more closely with the movement in 1960, first on the Committee to Defend Martin Luther King and later as one of the primary organizers of the march outside the 1960 Democratic National Convention, which intended to strengthen the Democratic Party's position on civil rights. During this period, Harrington developed a working relationship with King, and the two began sharing ideas.

The Other America, Harrington's 1962 book about poverty in the post-war period, later went on to influence the initial efforts of John F. Kennedy to address poverty and added to the momentum of the War on Poverty by Lyndon B. Johnson after Kennedy's assassination. Harrington joined the Selma to Montgomery marches in 1965, and was influenced by King's "How Long, Not Long" address at the Alabama capitol building in Montgomery, widely considered one of King's greatest speeches. Historian Maurice Isserman describes Harrington as "the man who had the ear of Martin Luther King". King shared many of Harrington's fundamental concerns, writes historian Thomas F. Jackson, both believing that "poverty derived not only from unemployment and inadequate welfare policies but also from institutional disempowerment in relation to the police, urban renewal authorities, educational bureaucracies, and city hall." King later named "The Other America" speech in homage to Harrington's work.

=== John Kenneth Galbraith ===
In January and February 1967, King completed the final draft of his book Where Do We Go from Here: Chaos or Community? while on vacation in Jamaica. Many of the ideas in the book, such as King's adoption of progressive ideas to combat poverty, were inspired by economist John Kenneth Galbraith, particularly the idea that wealth inequality was due to structural poverty, not from a failure to work hard or from individual choices. Galbraith previously discussed a related idea in December 1966, writing in The Progressive, "We need to consider the one prompt and effective solution for poverty, which is to provide everyone with a minimum income."

Similar ideas for poverty reduction had already been well known in the civil rights movement, proposed earlier by Rustin and Sadie T. M. Alexander. King advanced the idea of a guaranteed minimum income in Where Do We Go from Here, which was followed by its inclusion in "The Other America" speech several months later. Almost a week after King delivered his speech at Stanford, Galbraith called on the Democratic Party to adopt a guaranteed income in its policy platform.

=== Poor People's Campaign ===
Why are there forty million poor people in America? ... When you ask that question, you begin to question the capitalistic economy ... communism forgets that life is individual. Capitalism forgets that life is social ... the kingdom of brotherhood is found [in] neither ... but in a higher synthesis ... the problem of racism, the problem of economic exploitation, and the problem of war are all tied together.

— Martin Luther King Jr., August 16, 1967.

By November 1967, a Harris Poll published by The New York Times showed that a majority of Americans supported poverty reduction programs similar to King's, with 56% supporting federal programs to provide jobs for those living in American ghettos alone. The next month, King announced the beginning of the Poor People's Campaign (PPC), described by historian Sylvie Laurent as "a mass movement seeking a massive redistribution of wealth and power." Like "The Other America" speech, the PPC also called for a guaranteed income. In his last meeting with him before his assassination, King asked Harrington to draft a manifesto for the PPC. By March 1968, Robert F. Kennedy and King had formed a loose political alliance, with Kennedy supporting the goals of the PPC and helping King raise funds for the campaign, which was scheduled to begin on April 22 in the capital and end in August, with a move to Miami and then Chicago.

=== Civil rights and peace movement ===
Ten days before giving his first address of the speech at Stanford, King delivered "Beyond Vietnam: A Time to Break Silence" at Riverside Church in New York City on April 4, 1967. In that speech, King called for an end to the war, eliciting a negative response from the media establishment and the NAACP, accusing King of fusing the civil rights movement with the anti-war movement, and weakening the struggle for civil rights. Ten days later, King delivered "The Other America" speech at Stanford, just one day before the Spring Mobilization Committee to End the War in Vietnam brought anti-war protests to San Francisco and New York City.

After King delivered his speech in California, he left for New York. The next day, on April 15, upwards of 40,000 peaceful anti-war protesters took to the streets in the Bay Area, marching from 2nd and Market Street to Kezar Stadium, adjacent to the Haight-Ashbury. King's wife, Coretta Scott King, remained in San Francisco to address 5000 people at Kezar with a speech of her own. She was introduced by state assemblymember John Burton to the crowd as "maybe the next First Lady".

At the same time, Martin Luther King, now in New York, marched with 125,000 protesters from Manhattan's Central Park to the United Nations. At that rally, William F. Pepper of the National Conference for New Politics Convention announced that King was considered a contender for the 1968 United States presidential election as an independent. Soon after, Hearst columnist Marianne Means described concerns among the Democratic Party that King was going to try and split the vote in the upcoming election by running for president on a "peace ticket", with King predicted to attract at least 10% of the vote.

== Documentary film ==
Documentary filmmaker Allen Willis recorded King's speech at Stanford Memorial Auditorium on 16 mm film for PBS member television station KQED in San Francisco. Willis, who studied photography under Ansel Adams, began working at KQED in 1963, and was one of the first Black Americans to work in broadcast journalism in California.

External videos
- "The Other America" (1967). Digitally restored from a 16mm optical newsfilm by the Bay Area Television Archive.

The film first appears in TV listings for California public television in 1972 as part of the KQED Retrospect series, which looked back at the station's previous 15 years of coverage. The speech was shown along with an added discussion, for a combined 90-minute episode. The discussion was conducted by KQED general manager Richard O. Moore, who interviewed two of King's former colleagues, Booker T. Anderson and Harold Varner. Versions of the speech continued to air on California television throughout the 1980s and 1990s.

In the 1970s, many television stations throughout the United States lacked formal preservation policies, and habitually discarded millions of hours of film footage dating back to the 1950s. In 1981, the J. Paul Leonard Library at San Francisco State University acquired the KQED film archives. King's speech was later digitized by the Bay Area Television Archive, now hosted by the Digital Information Virtual Archive (DIVA) for free public viewing. Clips from another recording of the Stanford speech, along with high-quality audio recorded by KPIX-TV, also appear on the DIVA site.

== Versions ==
The 1967 Stanford speech is recognized as King's first version of "The Other America" speech, but King scholars have identified at least four other versions of the speech that were delivered at different venues from 1967 to 1968. Earlier versions may also exist, including a version identified as taking place at the Hotel America in Hartford, Connecticut, on March 12, 1967.

- "The Other America", Stanford University, Stanford, California (April 14, 1967).
- "The Other America", Ford Hall Forum, Boston, Massachusetts (April 23, 1967)
- "The Other America", Address to Local 1199 Salute to Freedom, Hunter College, New York (March 10, 1968)
- "The Other America", Grosse Pointe High School, Grosse Pointe, Michigan (March 14, 1968)
- "The Other America", California Democratic Council, Los Angeles, California (March 16, 1968)

== See also ==
- Sermons and speeches of Martin Luther King Jr.
- Bibliography of Martin Luther King Jr.
