= Prayer Pilgrimage for Freedom =

Civil Rights demonstration in Washington D.C.

- Part of the Civil Rights Movement
- Date: May 17, 1957
- Location: Washington, D.C. at the Lincoln Memorial
- Caused by: Third anniversary of ruling Brown v. Board of Education (1954); Massive resistance by proponents of racial segregation in education
- Result: Speech "Give Us the Ballot" delivered by Martin Luther King Jr.

Parties
Southern Christian Leadership Conference (SCLC); National Association for the Advancement of Colored People (NAACP)	Member of Congress

Lead figures
SCLC members: Martin Luther King Jr.; NAACP members: Roy Wilkins; Organizers: A. Philip Randolph; Bayard Rustin; Ella Baker	Congressman: Adam Clayton Powell Jr.

The Prayer Pilgrimage for Freedom, or Prayer Pilgrimage to Washington, was a 1957 demonstration in Washington, D.C., an early event in the Civil Rights Movement of the 1950s and 1960s. It was the occasion for Martin Luther King Jr.'s Give Us the Ballot speech.

== Background ==
The demonstration was planned to mark the third anniversary of the Brown v. Board of Education (1954), a landmark Supreme Court decision ruling that segregation in public schools was unconstitutional. The event organizers urged the government to implement that decision, as the desegregation process was being obstructed in much of the Southern United States at local and state levels.

The march was organized by A. Philip Randolph, Bayard Rustin, and Ella Baker. It was supported by the NAACP and the recently founded Southern Christian Leadership Conference. Congressman Adam Clayton Powell Jr. (D-NY) had asked the planners to avoid embarrassing the Republican Dwight D. Eisenhower administration, and they organized the event as a prayer commemoration. A call for the demonstration was issued on April 5, 1957, by Randolph, Martin Luther King Jr., and Roy Wilkins. According to King, Walter Reuther, president of the United Auto Workers, sent letters to all of his local unions, requesting members to attend the march and provide financial support.

== Demonstration ==
A Time for Freedom (1957), a documentary with footage from the Prayer Pilgrimage for Freedom demonstration and speeches

The three-hour demonstration was held in front of the Lincoln Memorial on the Mall. Mahalia Jackson and Harry Belafonte participated in the event. Paul Robeson and his wife Eslanda attended, but were largely ignored. Among the speakers were Wilkins, Mordecai Johnson, and King. King was the last speaker, and it was the first time that he addressed a national audience. He identified restoration and enforcement of voting rights for blacks as an important part of the civil rights struggle. About 25,000 demonstrators attended the event to pray and voice their opinion. At the time, the event was the largest demonstration ever organized for civil rights.

=== "Give Us the Ballot" ===
King's speech is referred to as Give Us the Ballot, as he repeated this demand as a litany, followed by a listing of changes that would result in African Americans regaining voting rights:

Give us the ballot and we will no longer have to worry the federal government about our basic rights ...

Give us the ballot and we will no longer plead to the federal government for passage of an anti-lynching law ...

Give us the ballot and we will fill our legislative halls with men of good will ...

Give us the ballot and we will place judges on the benches of the South who will do justly and love mercy ...

Give us the ballot and we will quietly and nonviolently, without rancor or bitterness, implement the Supreme Court's decision of May 17, 1954.

It is one of King's major speeches.

== Results ==
With this speech, King established himself as the "No. 1 leader of 16 million Negroes," according to James L. Hicks, of the Amsterdam News). His call for the ballot eventually helped inspire such events as the Selma Voting Rights Movement, its related Selma to Montgomery March, and the 1965 Voting Rights Act. The organizers gained experience, and the march laid the foundation for additional, larger Civil Rights Movement demonstrations in Washington.

== See also ==
- Sermons and speeches of Martin Luther King Jr.
- Bibliography of Martin Luther King Jr.
