= Beyond Vietnam: A Time to Break Silence =

1967 speech delivered by Martin Luther King Jr.

"Beyond Vietnam: A Time to Break Silence", also referred as the Riverside Church speech, is an anti–Vietnam War and pro–social justice speech delivered by Martin Luther King Jr. on April 4, 1967, in New York City exactly one year before he was assassinated.

== Background ==
The major speech at Riverside Church in New York City followed several interviews and several other public speeches in which King came out against the Vietnam War and the policies that created it. Some, like civil rights leader Ralph Bunche, the NAACP, and the editorial page writers of The Washington Post and The New York Times called the Riverside Church speech a mistake on King's part. The New York Times editorial suggested that conflating the civil rights movement with the Anti-war movement was an oversimplification that did justice to neither, stating that "linking these hard, complex problems will lead not to solutions but to deeper confusion." Others, including James Bevel, King's partner and strategist in the Civil Rights Movement, called it King's most important speech. It was written by activist and historian Vincent Harding.

King was long opposed to American involvement in the Vietnam War, but at first avoided the topic in public speeches in order to avoid the interference with civil rights goals that criticism of President Johnson's policies might have created. At the urging of people such as SCLC's former Director of Direct Action and now the head of the Spring Mobilization Committee to End the War in Vietnam, James Bevel, and inspired by the outspokenness of Muhammad Ali, King eventually agreed to publicly oppose the war as opposition was growing among the American public.

King delivered the speech, sponsored by the group Clergy and Laymen Concerned About Vietnam, after committing to participate in New York's April 15, 1967 anti-Vietnam war march from Central Park to the United Nations, sponsored by the Spring Mobilization to End the War in Vietnam.

== Content ==
External audio
- "Beyond Vietnam: A Time To Break Silence" (1967)

King spoke strongly against the U.S. role in the war, arguing that it was in Vietnam "to occupy it as an American colony" and calling the U.S. government "the greatest purveyor of violence in the world today." He connected the war with economic injustice, arguing that the country needed serious moral change:

A true revolution of values will soon look uneasily on the glaring contrast of poverty and wealth. With righteous indignation, it will look across the seas and see individual capitalists of the West investing huge sums of money in Asia, Africa and South America, only to take the profits out with no concern for the social betterment of the countries, and say: "This is not just."

King opposed the Vietnam War because it took money and resources that could have been spent on social welfare at home. The United States Congress was spending more and more on the military and less and less on anti-poverty programs at the same time. He summed up this aspect by saying, "A nation that continues year after year to spend more money on military defense than on programs of social uplift is approaching spiritual death." He stated that North Vietnam "did not begin to send in any large number of supplies or men until American forces had arrived in the tens of thousands", and accused the U.S. of having killed a million Vietnamese, "mostly children."

King also criticized American opposition to North Vietnam's land reforms.

== Aftermath ==
King's opposition cost him significant support among white allies, including President Johnson, Billy Graham, union leaders and powerful publishers. "The press is being stacked against me", King said, complaining of what he described as a double standard that applauded his nonviolence at home, but deplored it when applied "toward little brown Vietnamese children." Life magazine called the speech "demagogic slander that sounded like a script for Radio Hanoi", and The Washington Post declared that King had "diminished his usefulness to his cause, his country, his people."

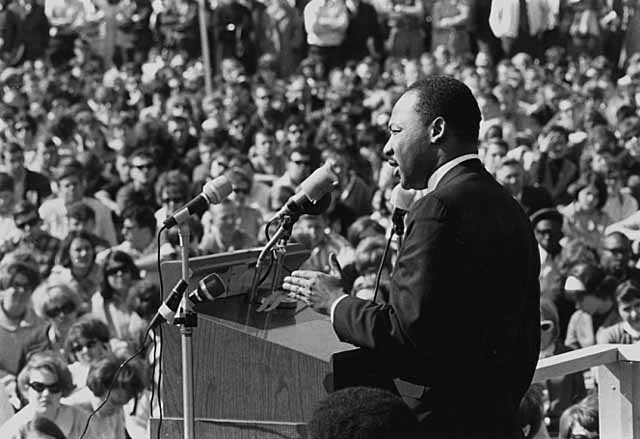
Anti-Vietnam war rally, U of M, St. Paul, April 27, 1967

The "Beyond Vietnam" speech reflected King's evolving political advocacy in his later years, which paralleled the teachings of the progressive Highlander Research and Education Center, with which he was affiliated. King began to speak of the need for fundamental changes in the political and economic life of the nation, and more frequently expressed his opposition to the war and his desire to see a redistribution of resources to correct racial and economic injustice. He guarded his language in public to avoid being linked to communism by his enemies, but in private he sometimes spoke of his support for democratic socialism.

In a 1952 letter to Coretta Scott, he said: "I imagine you already know that I am much more socialistic in my economic theory than capitalistic ..." In one speech, he stated that "something is wrong with capitalism" and claimed, "There must be a better distribution of wealth, and maybe America must move toward a democratic socialism." King had read Marx while at Morehouse, but while he rejected "traditional capitalism", he also rejected communism because of its "materialistic interpretation of history" that denied religion, its "ethical relativism", and its "political totalitarianism."

King also stated in "Beyond Vietnam" that "true compassion is more than flinging a coin to a beggar ... it comes to see that an edifice which produces beggars needs restructuring." King quoted a United States official who said that from Vietnam to Latin America, the country was "on the wrong side of a world revolution." King condemned America's "alliance with the landed gentry of Latin America", and said that the U.S. should support "the shirtless and barefoot people" in the Third World rather than suppressing their attempts at revolution.

King's stance on Vietnam encouraged Allard K. Lowenstein, William Sloane Coffin and Norman Thomas, with the support of anti-war Democrats, to attempt to persuade King to run against President Johnson in the 1968 United States presidential election. King contemplated but ultimately decided against the proposal on the grounds that he felt uneasy with politics and considered himself better suited for his morally unambiguous role as an activist.

Ten days after the Riverside Church speech, King gave one of his first speeches at Stanford University on the theme of "The Other America", briefly touching on his opposition to the war. The next day, on April 15, 1967, the Spring Mobilization Committee to End the War in Vietnam brought anti-war protests to California and New York. Upwards of 40,000 people marched in the streets of San Francisco, with Coretta Scott King addressing 5000 protesters at Kezar Stadium. At the same time, 125,000 marched with Martin Luther King in New York from Manhattan's Central Park to the United Nations. That march was also organized by the Spring Mobilization Committee and initiated by its chairman, James Bevel. At the UN, King brought up issues of civil rights and the draft.

I have not urged a mechanical fusion of the civil rights and peace movements. There are people who have come to see the moral imperative of equality, but who cannot yet see the moral imperative of world brotherhood. I would like to see the fervor of the civil-rights movement imbued into the peace movement to instill it with greater strength. And I believe everyone has a duty to be in both the civil-rights and peace movements. But for those who presently choose but one, I would hope they will finally come to see the moral roots common to both.

The same year, King nominated Buddhist monk Thich Nhat Hanh for the Nobel Peace Prize, but the prize was not awarded to anyone that year. Thich Nhat Hanh, who publicly held a news conference in Chicago with King in 1966, was acknowledged for urging King to oppose the Vietnam War.

== Legacy ==
In 2010, PBS commentator Tavis Smiley said that the speech was the most controversial speech of King's career, and the one he "labored over the most".

== In popular culture ==
A portion of this speech is used in the track "Wisdom, Justice, and Love" by Linkin Park, from their 2010 album A Thousand Suns.

One of the eight "sound cells" in @Large, Ai Weiwei's 2014–15 exhibit at Alcatraz, features King's voice giving the "Beyond Vietnam" speech.

Excerpts from this speech are used in the songs "Together" and "Spirit" by Nordic Giants.

== See also ==
- Sermons and speeches of Martin Luther King Jr.
- Bibliography of Martin Luther King Jr.

== Sources ==
- Lawson, Steven F.; Payne, Charles M.; Patterson, James T. (2006). Debating the Civil Rights Movement, 1945–1968. Rowman & Littlefield. ISBN 0-7425-5109-1.
- Robbins, Mary Susannah (2007). Against the Vietnam War: Writings by Activists. Rowman & Littlefield. ISBN 978-0-7425-5914-1.
