= Rugged individualism =

Phrase coined by Herbert Hoover

Rugged individualism, also known as radical individualism, derived from individualism, is a term that indicates that an individual is self-reliant and independent from outside (usually government or some other form of collective) assistance or support. While the term is often associated with the notion of laissez-faire and associated adherents, it was actually coined by United States president Herbert Hoover.

== History ==
American rugged individualism has its origins in the American frontier experience. Throughout its evolution, the American frontier was generally sparsely populated and had very little infrastructure in place. Under such conditions, individuals had to provide for themselves to survive. This kind of environment forced people to work in isolation from the larger community and may have altered attitudes at the frontier in favor of individualistic thought over collectivism.

Through the mid-twentieth century, the concept was championed by Hoover's former secretary of the interior and long-time Stanford University president Ray Lyman Wilbur, who wrote: "It is common talk that every individual is entitled to economic security. The only animals and birds I know that have economic security are those that have been domesticated—and the economic security they have is controlled by the barbed-wire fence, the butcher's knife and the desire of others. They are milked, skinned, egged or eaten up by their protectors."

Martin Luther King Jr. notably remarked on the term in one version of "The Other America", a speech delievered at Hunter College on March 10, 1968: "This country has socialism for the rich, rugged individualism for the poor." Bernie Sanders referenced King's quote in a 2019 speech. In 2026, New York City mayor Zohran Mamdani, a democratic socialist, pledged to "replace the frigidity of rugged individualism with the warmth of collectivism" in his inaugural speech.

== Influence on contemporary America ==
The ideal of rugged individualism continues to be a part of American thought. In 2016, a poll by Pew Research found that 57% of Americans did not believe that success in life was determined by forces outside of their control. Additionally, the same poll found that 58% of Americans valued a non-interventionist government over one that actively worked to further the needs of society.

Academics interviewed in the 2020 book Rugged Individualism and the Misunderstanding of American Inequality, co-written by Noam Chomsky, largely found that the continued belief in this brand of individualism is a strong factor in American policies surrounding social spending and welfare. Americans who more strongly believe in the values espoused by rugged individualism tend to view those who seek government assistance as being responsible for their position, leading to decreased support for welfare programs and increased support for stricter criteria for receiving government help. The influence of American individualistic thought extends to government regulation as well. Areas of the country which were part of the American frontier for longer, and were therefore more influenced by the frontier experience, were found to be more likely to be supportive of Republican candidates, who often vote against regulations such as gun control, minimum wage increases, and environmental regulation.

A 2021 research article posits that American "rugged individualism" hampered social distancing and mask use during the COVID-19 pandemic.

== See also ==
- Classical liberalism
- Conservatism in the United States
- Self-sufficiency
- Social Darwinism
