= Two Americas =

Phrase used by Martin Luther King Jr.

Two Americas is a phrase used by Martin Luther King Jr. in his 1967 speech "The Other America" to describe the differences in what life is like for Black/African-Americans and Whites due to the lack of equal protection under the law and the racial class system designed to keep people with African and Native ancestry from equality and freedom. John Edwards later revisited the Two Americas theme frequently in his 2004 run for vice president and his 2008 presidential campaign.

== Martin Luther King Jr. ==
King refers to a lack of opportunities, jobs, minimum wage, and support for poor citizens. To support his claims, he lists the hardship of Black people: unemployment rates, annual income, lynchings, voter suppression, church burnings/bombings, lack of training and educational opportunities and compared it to the bountiful resources and supportive conditions of White Middle America. He gave this speech multiple times, including on April 14, 1967, at Stanford University. In the speech, he discusses the connections between racism and economic oppression and concludes that a universal basic income is necessary to solve these problems.

I use this subject because there are literally two Americas. One America is beautiful for situation. And, in a sense, this America is overflowing with the milk of prosperity and the honey of opportunity. This America is the habitat of millions of people who have food and material necessities for their bodies; and culture and education for their minds; and freedom and human dignity for their spirits. In this America, millions of people experience every day the opportunity of having life, liberty, and the pursuit of happiness in all of their dimensions. And in this America millions of young people grow up in the sunlight of opportunity.

But tragically and unfortunately, there is another America. This other America has a daily ugliness about it that constantly transforms the ebulliency of hope into the fatigue of despair. In this America millions of work-starved men walk the streets daily in search for jobs that do not exist. In this America millions of people find themselves living in rat-infested, vermin-filled slums. In this America people are poor by the millions. They find themselves perishing on a lonely island of poverty in the midst of a vast ocean of material prosperity.

== John Edwards ==
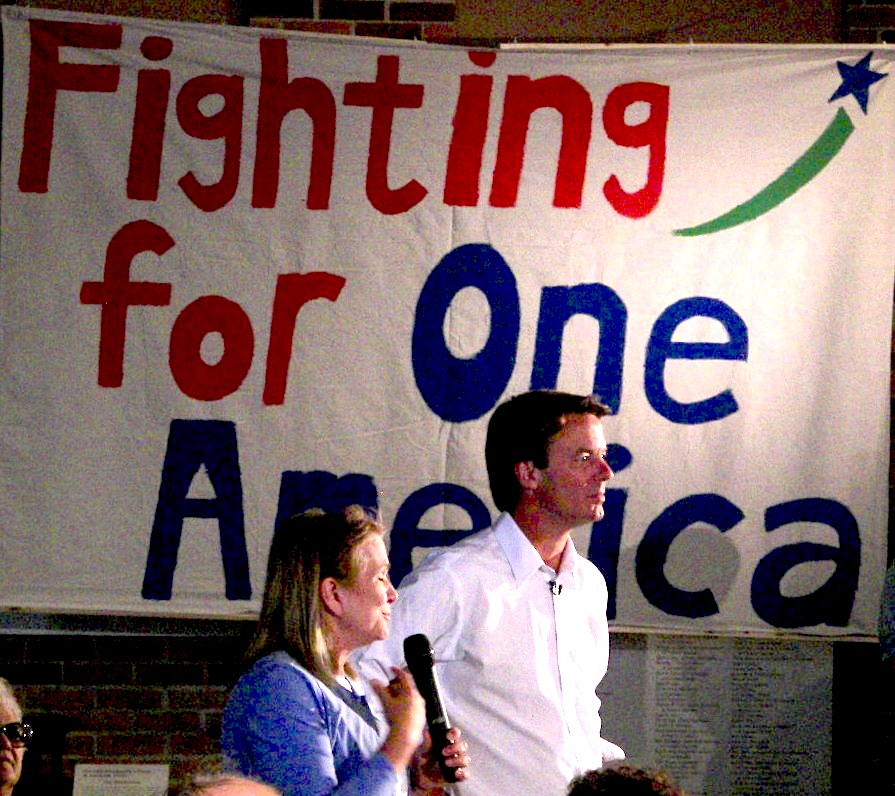
Edwards and his wife, Elizabeth, during his 2008 presidential campaign, speaking in front of a sign reading "fighting for one America"

Former U.S. Senator and former presidential candidate John Edwards used the "Two Americas" concept in a 2004 speech, making it into a catch phrase referring to social stratification. The speech has since become popular and inspired many parodies and similar metaphors. Although not necessarily the most prominent issue for other candidates in the seasons in which he campaigned for president, poverty has typically been a mainstay of liberal politics and a major focus for Edwards' campaign efforts. Edwards has since expanded the metaphor further, for instance in a guest blog entry in the aftermath of Hurricane Katrina:

During the campaign of 2004, I spoke often of the two Americas: the America of the privileged and the wealthy, and the America of those who lived from paycheck to paycheck. I spoke of the difference in the schools, the difference in the loan rates, the difference in opportunity. All of that pales today. Today ... we see a harsher example of two Americas. We see the poor and working class of New Orleans who don't own a car and couldn't evacuate to hotels or families far from the target of Katrina. We see the suffering of families who lived from paycheck to paycheck and who followed the advice of officials and went to shelters at the Civic Center or the Superdome or stayed home to protect their possessions.

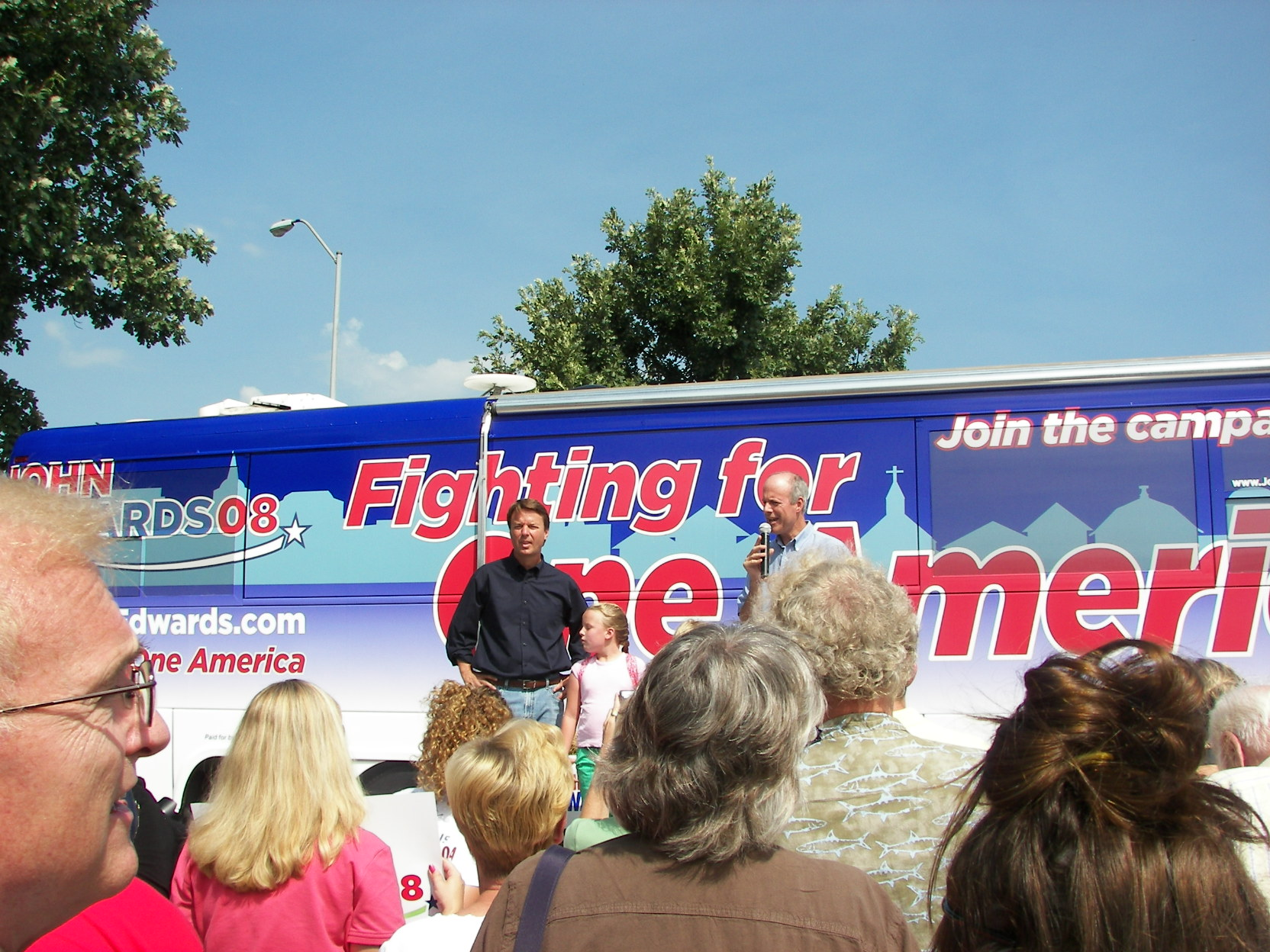
Edwards is joined by Ed Fallon at a campaign rally in front of a campaign bus reading "fighting for one America".

The following are excerpts from a speech given by Senator John Edwards as Democratic vice presidential nominee to the 2004 Democratic National Convention on 28 July 2004, based on the idea of Two Americas.

I have spent my life fighting for the kind of people I grew up with. For two decades, I stood with kids and families against big HMOs and big insurance companies. When I got to the Senate, I fought those same fights against the Washington lobbyists and for causes like the Patients' Bill of Rights. I stand here tonight ready to work with you and John [Kerry] to make America stronger. And we have much work to do, because the truth is, we still live in a country where there are two different Americas... [applause] one, for all of those people who have lived the American dream and don't have to worry, and another for most Americans, everybody else who struggle to make ends meet every single day. It doesn't have to be that way...

We can build one America where we no longer have two health care systems: one for families who get the best health care money can buy, and then one for everybody else rationed out by insurance companies, drug companies, HMOs. Millions of Americans have no health coverage at all. It doesn't have to be that way. We have a plan...

We shouldn't have two public school systems in this country: one for the most affluent communities, and one for everybody else. None of us believe that the quality of a child's education should be controlled by where they live or the affluence of the community they live in. It doesn't have to be that way. We can build one school system that works for all our kids, gives them a chance to do what they're capable of doing...

John Kerry and I believe that we shouldn't have two different economies in America: one for people who are set for life, they know their kids and their grand-kids are going to be just fine; and then one for most Americans, people who live paycheck to paycheck...

So let me give you some specifics. First, we can create good-paying jobs in this country again. We're going to get rid of tax cuts for companies who are outsourcing your jobs... [applause] and, instead, we're going to give tax breaks to American companies that are keeping jobs right here in America...

Well, let me tell you how we're going to pay for it. And I want to be very clear about this. We are going to keep and protect the tax cuts for 98 percent of Americans – 98 percent. We're going to roll back – we're going to roll back the tax cuts for the wealthiest Americans. And we're going to close corporate loopholes...

Edwards later revisited the Two Americas theme frequently in his 2008 presidential election campaign.

== Other uses ==
In his speech to the 1982 Democratic Midterm Conference, Walter Mondale assailed the presidency of Ronald Reagan by arguing that Reagan had created, "two Americas —one where the well-to-do get more and more, and one where the rest of us get less and less."

During the opening evening of the 2020 Democratic National Convention, the phrase was used in a speech by Kristin Urquiza, which was regarded by pundits to have been one of the standout speeches of the evening. Urquiza was the daughter of a man who died after contracting COVID-19. Urquiza believed his father (who had voted and supported Trump) likely contracted the disease after having gone with friends to a karaoke bar in the early onslaught of the COVID-19 pandemic in the United States, and faulted his having heeded the public messaging of Trump and other Republicans that had downplayed the dangers of the pandemic. In her speech, Urquiza declared, "My dad was a healthy 65-year-old. His only pre-existing condition was trusting Donald Trump, and for that, he paid with his life...The coronavirus has made it clear that there are two Americas; the America that Donald Trump lives in and the America that my father died in."

== See also ==
- Cross of Gold speech
- "I Have a Dream"
- Make America Great Again
- One nation conservatism
- "The Other America"
- One Nation Under God
- Poverty in the United States
- "Read my lips: no new taxes"
- Red states and blue states
- Silent majority
- Sybil, or The Two Nations
