= Give Us the Ballot =

1957 speech by Martin Luther King Jr.

"Give Us the Ballot" is a 1957 speech by Martin Luther King Jr. advocating voting rights for African Americans in the United States. King delivered the speech at the Prayer Pilgrimage for Freedom gathering at the Lincoln Memorial in Washington, D.C., on May 17.

In the key section of the speech King listed some of the changes that would result by African Americans regaining voting rights:

"Give us the ballot and we will no longer have to worry the federal government about our basic rights ...

"Give us the ballot and we will no longer plead to the federal government for passage of an anti-lynching law ...

"Give us the ballot and we will fill our legislative halls with men of good will ...

"Give us the ballot and we will place judges on the benches of the South who will do justly and love mercy ...

"Give us the ballot and we will quietly and nonviolently, without rancor or bitterness, implement the Supreme Court's decision of May 17, 1954."

It is one of King's major speeches, and has been used to call for voter registration and for reducing vote restrictions. It has also been cited for galvanising other major rights movements, including the LGBTQ movements and rights movements for Latinos, Native Americans, and immigrants, among others.

== See also ==
- Selma to Montgomery marches
- Civil Rights Movement
- Bibliography of Martin Luther King Jr.
