= Allen Willis =

- Born: June 10, 1916; Washington, District of Columbia, USA
- Died: February 23, 2011 (aged 94); Oakland, California, USA
- Occupations: Director, writer
- Spouse: Lillian
- Awards: Emmy Awards

Allen Willis (June 10, 1916 – February 23, 2011) was an American documentary film director. He is considered the dean of African-American filmmakers in the San Francisco Bay Area.

== Biography ==
Willis was born on June 10, 1916, in Washington, D.C., to Tiney Willis and Charles E. Smith. He was the brother of Ederson, Julia, Thelma, William, Evelyn and Clayton. In the 1930s, he met writer Langston Hughes and Marxist philosopher Raya Dunayevskaya which prompted him to devote his life to socialist reform. In the 1950s he moved to the San Francisco Bay Area with his wife, Lillian.

== Early life and education ==
After his arrival in the Bay Area, Allen studied under photographer Ansel Adams at what is now called the San Francisco Art Institute.

In 1955, he produced, directed, filmed and edited the 16-millimeter film "Have You Sold Your Dozen Roses?" with San Francisco poet Lawrence Ferlinghetti. Willis was also an early collaborator with Melvin Van Peebles around this time.

== Television and documentary film career ==
In 1963, Willis was hired by San Francisco public television station KQED, which according to the East Bay Media Center, made him the first African American in broadcast journalism in California. He also did the 1965 film The Psychedelic Experience with artist and teacher Jean Millay.

For the next 25 years, Willis would direct a number of award-winning films, including "Stagger Lee," a 1970 documentary on Black Panther leader Bobby Seale.

Additional films include "The Other America," a documentary on Martin Luther King, Jr.'s "white backlash" speech at Stanford University in 1967. He documented pivotal moments in Bay Area history, producing the first film exploration of the psychedelic drug experience and documenting the hippie revolution, the AIDS crisis and the 1970s California land grab.

== Later years ==
After retiring from KQED in 1986, Willis continued to write a column for the Marxist publication, "News and Letters" under the pseudonym John Alan. He wrote his last column for the publication in 2008.
