= The Psychedelic Experience (1965 film) =

- A frame from the film.
- Produced by: Jean Millay; Allen Willis
- Release date: January 23, 1965
- Running time: ~20 minutes
- Country: United States
- Language: English

The Psychedelic Experience is a 1965 short film about the psychedelic experience. It was made by artist and teacher Jean Millay and filmmaker Allen Willis. Millay had previously had a "life-changing" experience with the psychedelic drug peyote in 1963. The film featured voiceovers by Timothy Leary and Ralph Metzner and a flow of abstract images akin to psychedelic visuals and imagery. The music for the film was done by Indian classical musician Ravi Shankar. The film's duration is about 20 minutes. It won the Zellerbach Award for "Film as Art" at the 1965 San Francisco International Film Festival.

== See also ==
- List of films featuring hallucinogens
- Psychedelic art
- Psychedelic replication
- The Trip (1967 film)
