= The Other America =

1962 book by Michael Harrington

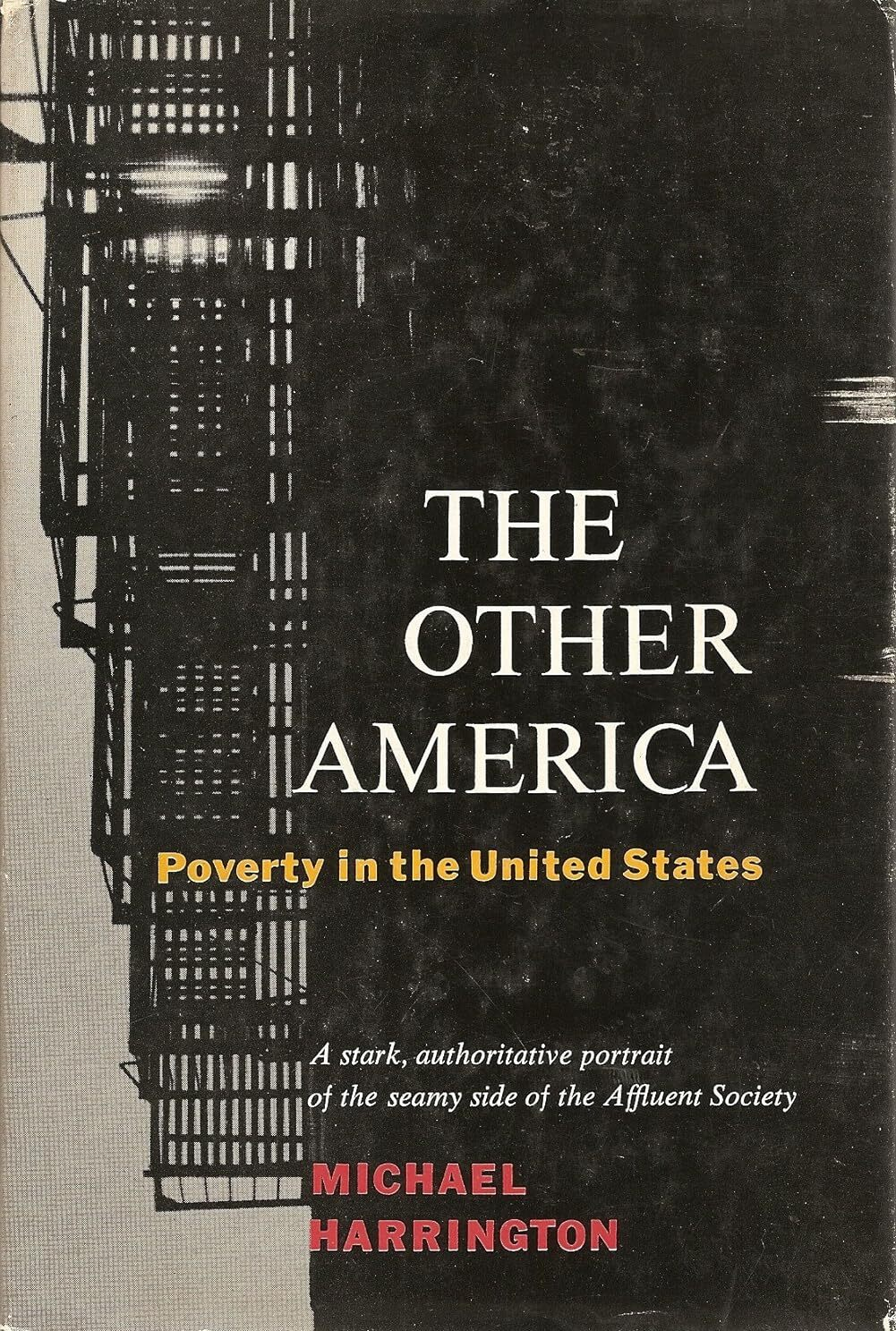
- First edition
- Author: Michael Harrington
- Language: English
- Publisher: The Macmillan Company
- Publication date: March 1962
- Media type: Print (hardcover, paperback)
- Pages: 191

The Other America: Poverty in the United States is a 1962 book by socialist writer Michael Harrington on the dire living conditions of the American poor. It was a muckraking-style exposé which spotlighted the entrenched poverty of 40–50 million people in a country that was being touted as "the affluent society".

The Other America became a publishing phenomenon after Dwight Macdonald gave it a laudatory review in The New Yorker in January 1963. His review reportedly prompted President Kennedy to read the book, and then to propose anti-poverty legislation later in 1963. The book was also said to have been a catalyst for the Johnson administration's War on Poverty program.

Harrington would go on to write over a dozen more works such as The Accidental Century (1965), Toward a Democratic Left (1968), and Socialism (1972), but none was as impactful as The Other America, which was listed by TIME magazine as one of the 10 most influential nonfiction books of the 20th century.

== Background ==
Economist John Kenneth Galbraith's 1958 bestseller The Affluent Society contained a critique of U.S. government policy that had allowed an "indefensible disparity between the opulence of the private sector and the starvation level at which the public sector was forced to operate." But Galbraith downplayed the problems of the underclass, saying poverty was no longer "a massive affliction [but] more nearly an afterthought." The book's title, combined with its analysis of the post-WWII expansion of the American middle class, led many to interpret The Affluent Society as a celebration of widespread prosperity.

It was against this backdrop that Harrington began his investigation of the poor. Monica Potts notes that he "was among the only writers to see the persistence of poverty despite the country's historically large middle class." The Other America grew out of his research for an article titled "Our Fifty Million Poor: Forgotten Men of the Affluent Society", published in the July 1959 issue of Commentary magazine. In the article, he wrote that if a $3,000 annual income was necessary for a family of four to stay out of poverty, then nearly a third of the U.S. population lived "below those standards which we have been taught to regard as the decent minimums for food, housing, clothing and health."

Harrington recalled in his autobiography that he initially ignored inquiries from publishers about converting his Commentary article into a book "until Emile Capouya at Macmillan and a few of my socialist friends convinced me that no one else would translate the available data into readable English. When The Other America turned into a success, I was astounded. Like the Zen archer who hits the target because he does not aim at it, I had given birth to a kind of classic without thinking too much about it."

== Book summary ==
=== The invisible poor ===
In the opening chapter, Harrington challenges the notion that mass poverty was largely eliminated in the U.S. He says the misconception arose because the poor are increasingly invisible:

The other America, the America of poverty, is hidden today in a way that it never was before. Its millions are socially invisible to the rest of us. No wonder that so many misinterpreted Galbraith's title and assumed that 'the affluent society' meant that everyone had a decent standard of life.

Harrington offers various reasons for why the poor are not seen, among them that rural poverty is usually found off the beaten path, away from main highways, and that urban poverty had become remote from most people's daily experience because of the post-WWII suburbanization of American cities: "Living out in the suburbs, it is easy to assume that ours is, indeed, an affluent society."

=== "Culture of poverty" ===
In the next chapters, Harrington categorizes different pockets of poverty. In Chapter 2, he lists those who have fallen—often due to job loss from factory closures or workplace automation—into the "economic underworld"; he calls them "the rejects of the affluent society". He chronicles the rural poor, including migrant farm workers and Appalachians (Ch. 3), Negroes in the urban ghetto (Ch. 4), Skid Row denizens (Ch. 5), the impoverished elderly (Ch. 6), and the mentally ill (Ch. 7). He writes about substandard housing in U.S. slums (Ch. 8), and then in Chapter 9 he explains how the poor get ensnared in a "culture of poverty". Harrington helped popularize the phrase; it appears dozens of times in the book, beginning with this passage:

[T]he real explanation of why the poor are where they are is that they made the mistake of being born to the wrong parents, in the wrong section of the country, in the wrong industry, or in the wrong racial or ethnic group. Once that mistake has been made, they could have been paragons of will and morality, but most of them would never even have had a chance to get out of the other America. There are two important ways of saying this: The poor are caught in a vicious circle; or, The poor live in a culture of poverty.

An irony for the socialist Harrington was that "culture of poverty", which he employed to elicit sympathy for the poor, would become a rhetorical weapon utilized by conservatives to chastise the poor. In a 2012 interview, Frances Fox Piven said that Harrington was talking, in terms similar to those used by anthropologist Oscar Lewis, about the culture of marginalization within which America's poor lived: "What happens to people when they are forever, permanently, consigned to live in ways that are not the ways of the majority, that are not the ways of the dominant culture, when they are consigned to a kind of degradation and hopelessness." But then she claimed that a shift occurred in public understanding of the connection between culture and material circumstances, and Harrington's "culture of poverty" came to mean "the minorities", and "promiscuous women having babies", and "those guys who mug nice people on the street" or skip over the subway turnstile: "So 'the poor' came to play a central role in the politics of the Right, or I should say the political propagandizing of the Right."

=== Moral persuasion ===
Harrington was a lifelong political activist who founded the Democratic Socialists of America, and yet The Other America is not an overtly pro-socialist tract. He later noted that in his composition of the book, he decided "not to talk about socialism because that would deflect attention from the poor." Instead, he makes a moral and ethical argument, rather than an ideological argument:

Throughout, I work on an assumption that cannot be proved by Government figures or even documented by impressions of the other America. It is an ethical proposition, and it can be simply stated: In a nation with a technology that could provide every citizen with a decent life, it is an outrage and a scandal that there should be such social misery. Only if one begins with this assumption is it possible to pierce through the invisibility of 40,000,000 to 50,000,000 human beings and to see the other America. We must perceive passionately, if this blindness is to be lifted from us. A fact can be rationalized and explained away; an indignity cannot.

The Other America continued a tradition of muckraking in the nation's journalism and literature—exemplified in works such as How the Other Half Lives by Jacob Riis—in which social wrongs are exposed to the reading public in order to trigger moral condemnation and political action. In a 2012 retrospective article, historian Maurice Isserman wrote, "The Other America was a book about poor people, but it was not a book written for poor people. The readers Harrington was speaking to were themselves citizens of the affluent society, whose consciences he sought to stir." For Isserman, "what remains vital in The Other America these many years later is its moral clarity."

Harrington concludes the book by saying that the figures he has presented (regarding income levels in different regions, age groups, etc.) can be put aside in the interest of looking at the bigger picture:

At this point I would beg the reader to forget the numbers game. Whatever the precise calibrations, it is obvious that these statistics represent an enormous, an unconscionable amount of human suffering in this land. They should be read with a sense of outrage. For until these facts shame us, until they stir us to action, the other America will continue to exist, a monstrous example of needless suffering in the most advanced society in the world.

== Reception and legacy ==
Initial expectations for the book's success were not great. In a March 1962 review of The Other America, Newsweek stated, "It's a shame that it will probably not sell very well. The comfortable majority isn't interested enough and the people who are, can't afford $4 for a 191 page book." According to New York Post editor James Wechsler, Harrington told him in 1962 that the anticipated sales amount was 2,500 copies "if all went well". Then, in January 1963, The New Yorker magazine published a lengthy rave review titled "Our Invisible Poor" by Dwight Macdonald. The review catapulted The Other America to national attention. Macdonald arranged (as Harrington subsequently discovered) for a second publication date, which soon lifted the book to bestseller status. The New Yorker review also attracted the attention of Ted Sorensen, an adviser to President Kennedy. The President reportedly asked Walter Heller, chairman of the Council of Economic Advisors, to obtain a copy of Harrington's book. It circulated in the White House, where it stimulated anti-poverty legislation.

Maurice Isserman wrote that The Other America proved "a publishing phenomenon, garnering substantial sales (seventy thousand in several editions within its first year and over a million in paperback since then), wide and respectful critical attention, and a significant influence over the direction of social welfare policy in the United States during the decade that followed." He gave the book major credit for the launching of President Lyndon Johnson's War on Poverty in 1964. In The New York Times obituary for Harrington, Herbert Mitgang suggested that the expansion of Social Security, Aid to Families with Dependent Children, and the Food Stamp Program, as well as the creation of programs such as Medicare, could all partly be traced to the effectiveness of Harrington's advocacy in The Other America.

Looking back in 1988, Harrington wrote, "Even though I have fled the success of The Other America for twenty-five years, it was an extraordinary stroke of luck that the book received the acclaim it did and then went on to have a minor but real historic impact." He added, however, that the book's triumph proved to be a mixed blessing for his writing career:

In many ways, the praise lavished on The Other America spoiled me forever when it came to being reviewed. But it also meant that I have lived for thirteen more books...in its shadow. It is an astounding experience to have your first book turn into a kind of classic, even a legend. It is also dispiriting to read on the cover of every succeeding book, "By the author of The Other America". If all writers are understandably sensitive about their reviews, I was even more so, not because I kept waiting for the lightning to strike again...but simply because I wanted people to realize that there was more to me than "the author of The Other America".

In August 2011, TIME magazine listed The Other America among its "100 best and most influential" nonfiction books written in English since the founding of the magazine in 1923. At a conference on the 50th anniversary of the 1962 publication, Cornel West said that while he admired the book, he never approved of its title, a criticism he voiced to Harrington in the 1980s:

I would tell him: Why would you even mention a title like The Other America? Don't otherize poor people. They are us and we are them. The difference has to be maybe materially. But once you otherize poor people, and then it is tied into the otherizing of people of color, it's going to be very difficult to generate the kind of connection, generosity, the kind of bonds, to recognize they are us and we are them.

== Documentary film ==
Bill Donovan's documentary film, Michael Harrington and Today's Other America: Corporate Power and Inequality (1999), encapsulates Harrington's ideas through archival footage and interviews with his colleagues and political opponents. Among the interviewees are John Kenneth Galbraith, Gloria Steinem, William F. Buckley, Charles Murray, and citizens who struggle to earn a living or depend on social services. The documentary also features a brief history of socialism in the U.S. and raises questions about the merits and relevance of trade unions; the problems of migrant workers, farmers, and big business; and the failures of America's public schools and healthcare system.

== See also ==
- Socialism for the rich and capitalism for the poor
- Two Americas
