= Stanford Memorial Auditorium =

Coordinates: 37°25′44″N 122°09′59″W

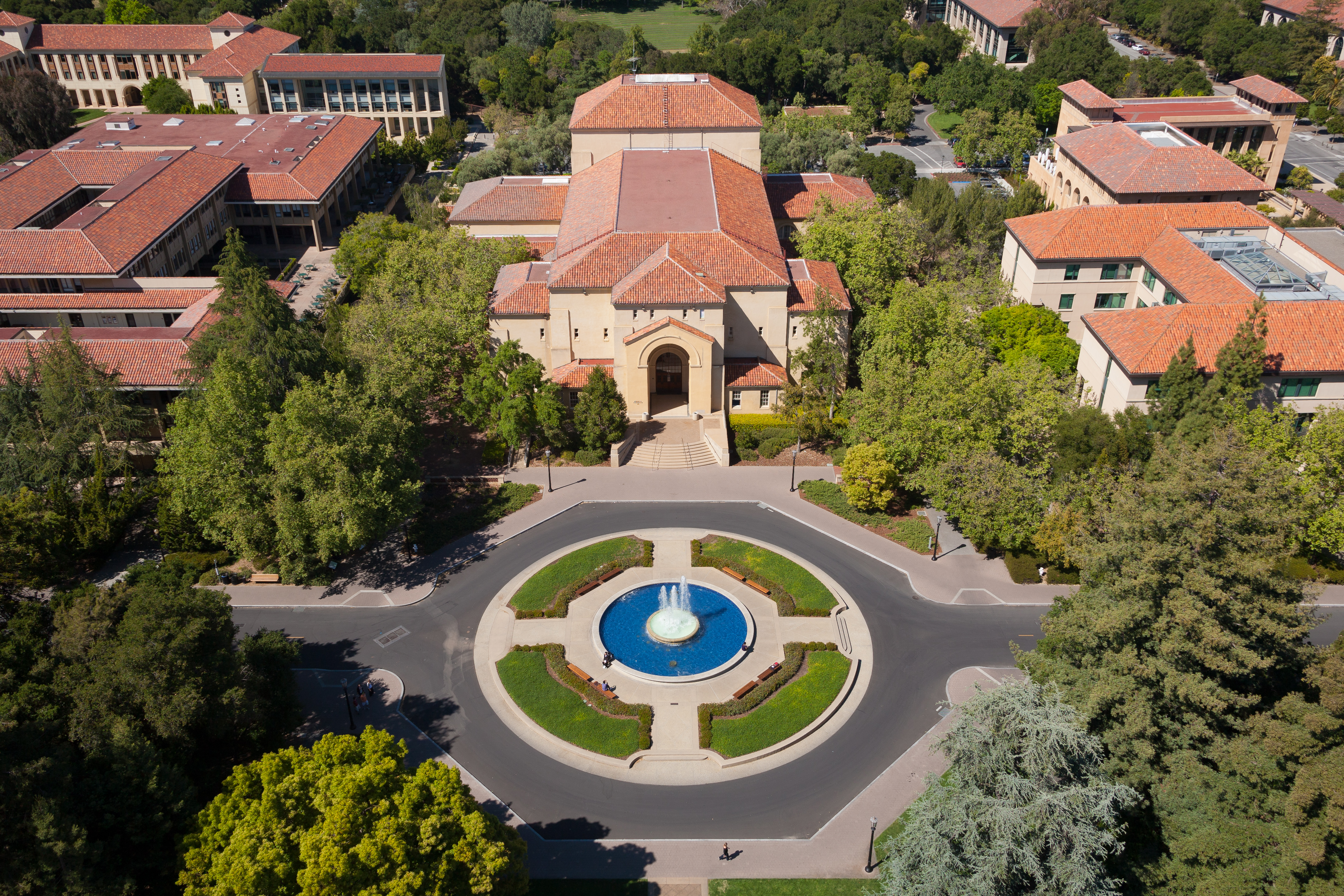
Memorial Auditorium

Memorial Hall (informally referred to as MemAud), was built in 1937 to commemorate those students and faculty from Stanford University who died in World War I. Designed by Arthur Brown, Jr. in conjunction with Bakewell and Weihe, construction of the building was funded primarily through student contributions.

Prominent features of the building include a great central arched entry, large arched entries on the sides, covered colonnades on the sides, bare wall surfaces in rectangular segments, and a red tile roof typical of many Stanford buildings. In addition to containing a main auditorium with 1,700 seats (Memorial Auditorium proper), it also houses the drama department; Pigott Theater, a "little" theater with 200 seats; and Prosser Studio Theater, which seats 60. Some modifications to the auditorium's facade were made in 1997 by Sebastian and Associates, including new entry stairs, terrace, and accessibility ramp.

Memorial Auditorium, as the largest indoor performance space at Stanford, is the site of performances, major speeches, academic conferences and student activities. Hot Chips, a symposium on hardware chips sponsored by IEEE, is held each summer in MemAud. In terms of student activities, much of New Student Orientation takes place inside the auditorium; Flicks, the Stanford movie service, screens movies in MemAud once every week; and Gaieties, a major part of the Big Game activities, takes place there in the days before the actual game. Major speaker events are commonly held in MemAud because of its size, such as Martin Luther King Jr.'s "The Other America" speech on April 14, 1967, Soviet President Mikhail S. Gorbachev in 1990, and the Dalai Lama's visits in 2005 and 2010.
