= Sermons and speeches of Martin Luther King Jr. =

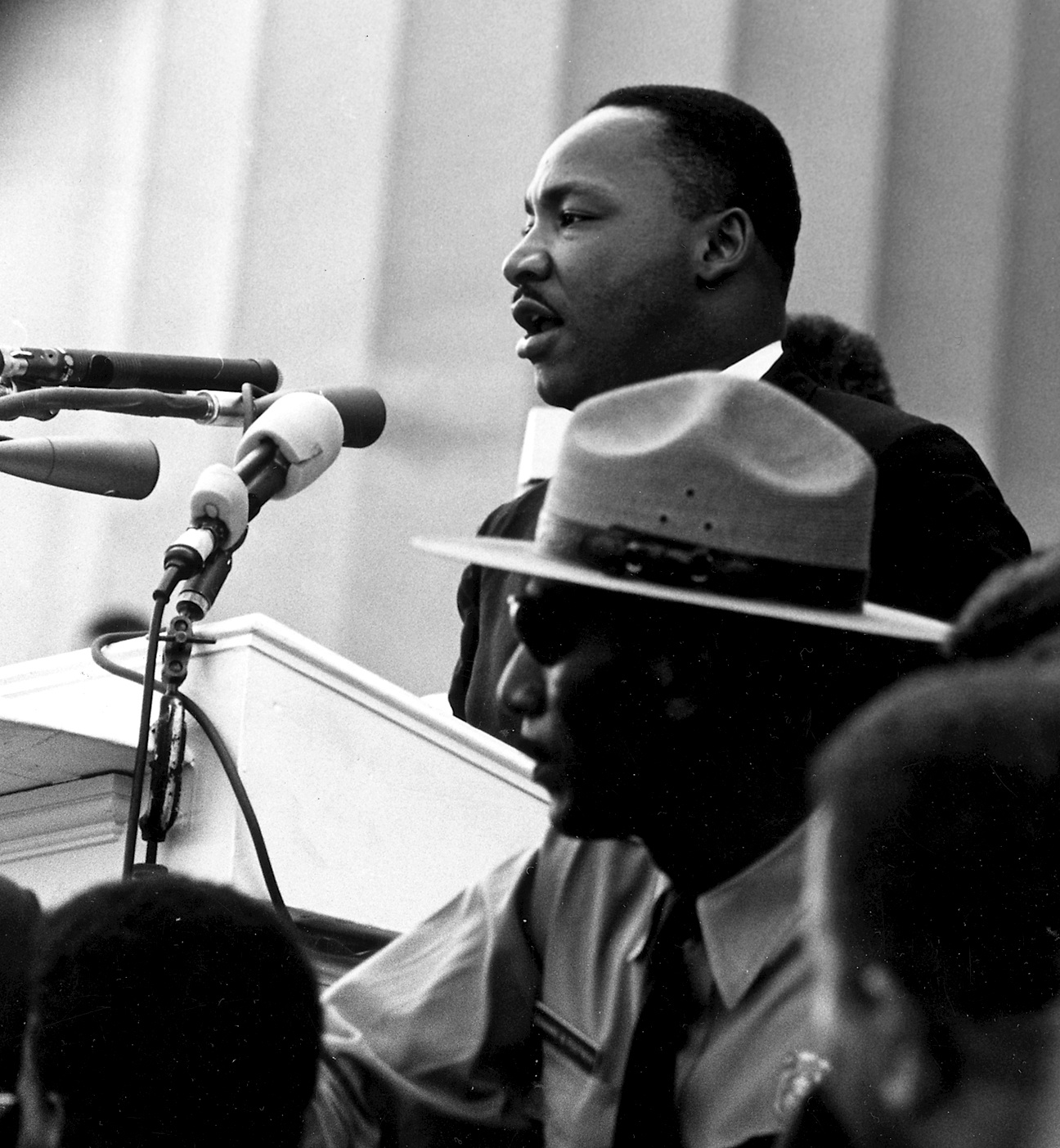
Martin Luther King Jr. at the podium on the steps of the Lincoln Memorial in August 1963

The sermons and speeches of Martin Luther King Jr., comprise an extensive catalog of American writing and oratory – some of which are internationally well-known, while others remain unheralded and await rediscovery.

Martin Luther King Jr. was a prominent African-American clergyman, a leader in the civil rights movement and a Nobel Peace Prize laureate.

King himself observed, "In the quiet recesses of my heart, I am fundamentally a clergyman, a Baptist preacher."

== Speechwriter and orator ==
The famous "I Have a Dream" address was delivered in August 1963 from the steps of the Lincoln Memorial in Washington, D.C. Less well-remembered are the early sermons of that young, 25-year-old pastor who first began preaching at the Dexter Avenue Baptist Church in Montgomery, Alabama, in 1954. As a political leader in the Civil Rights Movement and as a modest preacher in a Baptist church, King evolved and matured across the span of a life cut short. The range of his rhetoric was anticipated and encompassed within "The Three Dimensions of a Complete Life," which he preached as his trial sermon at Dexter Avenue Baptist Church in 1954 and every year thereafter for the rest of his life.

=== Sermons ===
- 1953 – "The Three Dimensions of a Complete Life"
- 1954 – "Rediscovering Lost Values", Sunday February 28, Detroit, Michigan.
- 1955 - "The Impassable Gulf (The Parable of Dives and Lazarus)", Sunday October 2, Dexter Avenue Baptist Church, Montgomery, Alabama.
- 1956 - "The Death of Evil Upon the Seashore", Wednesday May 17, Cathedral of St. John the Divine, New York City
- 1956 - "Living Under the Tensions of Modern Life", Sunday September (exact date unknown), Dexter Avenue Baptist Church, Montgomery, Alabama.
- 1956 – "Paul's Letter to American Christians", Sunday November 4, Dexter Avenue Baptist Church, Montgomery, Alabama.
- 1957 – "The Birth of a New Nation", Sunday April 7, Dexter Avenue Baptist Church, Montgomery, Alabama.
- 1957 – "Garden of Gethsemane", Sunday April 14, Dexter Avenue Baptist Church, Montgomery, Alabama.
- 1957 – "Loving Your Enemies", Sunday November 17, Dexter Avenue Baptist Church, Montgomery, Alabama.
- 1960 – "Why Jesus Called A Man A Fool", Sunday May 15, Ebenezer Baptist Church, Atlanta
  - Possibly the first time King delivered a variation of this sermon, see 27 August 1967 below
- 1963 – "Eulogy for the Martyred Children" (victims of 16th Street Baptist Church bombing), Wednesday September 18, Birmingham, Alabama
- 1964 - "Religious Witness for Human Dignity," May 31, Los Angeles Coliseum, California
- 1964 - "Religious Witness for Human Dignity," June 3, Goodwin Stadium, Arizona State University, and Tanner Chapel AME Church, Phoenix, Arizona
- 1966 – "Guidelines for a Constructive Church", Sunday June 5, Ebenezer Baptist Church, Atlanta
- 1967 – "The Three Dimensions Of A Complete Life", Sunday April 9, New Covenant Baptist Church, Chicago.
- 1967 - "Three Evils of Society" Address Delivered to the First Annual National Conference for New Politics
- 1967 - "The Casualties of the War in Vietnam" Address delivered at the Nation Institute
- 1967 – "Why Jesus Called A Man A Fool", Sunday August 27, Mt. Pisgah Missionary Baptist Church, Chicago
  - Possibly the last time King delivered a variation of this sermon, which started at least as early as May 15, 1960 (see above)
- 1967 – "A Knock at Midnight", Delivered on several occasions, including the Installation Service of Ralph Abernathy at Atlanta's West Hunter Baptist Church February 11, 1962.
- 1968 – "The Drum Major Instinct", Sunday February 4, Ebenezer Baptist Church, Atlanta.
- 1968 – "Remaining Awake Through a Great Revolution", Sunday March 31, National Cathedral, Washington, D.C.
  - King's last Sunday sermon.
- 1968 – "I've Been to the Mountaintop", Wednesday April 3, Mason Temple, Memphis, Tennessee.
- 1968 – "Why America May Go to Hell", planned to be delivered on Sunday April 7, but never delivered due to his assassination.

=== Speeches ===
Year	Date	Title	Location	Notes
Undated		"Who is Truly Great"	Unknown	From the Archival Description: "Dr. King addresses the subject of individual greatness within society and how to truly go about achieving such a status. He begins by dispelling common signifiers of greatness before indicating that greatness can only be substantively measured through the ability to put others before self. Dr. King cites the life of Jesus Christ as an example of humility culminating into greatness."
Undated	c. 1951 – c. 1954	"The Negro Past and Its Challenge for the Future"	Boston, MA	Negro History Week, Alpha Kappa Alpha Sorority, Twelfth Baptist Church
1954	February 28	"Rediscovering Lost Values"	Detroit, MI	A sermonic presentation containing some themes which would become part of King's eternal philosophy.
1954	March 7	Untitled Speech	Lansing, MI	King delivered a speech at the Union Baptist Church morning service. Later that day he spoke at Lansing's NAACP office.
1954	July 4	"A Religion of Doing"	Montgomery, AL	From the Archival Description: "King describes how "Christ is more concerned about our attitude towards racial prejudice and war than he is about our long processionals. He is more concerned with how we treat our neighbors than how loud we sing his praises.""
1955	Between June 28 and July 3	"The Task of Christian Leadership Training for Education in the Local Community"	Atlantic City, NJ	From the Archival Description: "King traveled to Atlantic City on 28 June to attend the National Sunday School and Baptist Training Union Congress.1 The subject matter of the following undated, typed manuscript indicates that it may have served as the basis for an address at the conference. King lays out three primary challenges facing local communities: economics, religious sectarianism, and race."
1955	May 8	"The Crisis in the Modern Family"	Montgomery, AL	This is not technically a speech, however its language and outline are similar to many speeches Dr. King delivered in forthcoming years.
1955	December 5	Montgomery Improvement Association mass meeting speech	Montgomery, AL	Main article: Montgomery Improvement Association
1956	July 23 and October 16	"Non-Aggression Procedures to Interracial Harmony"	Cortland, NY	From the Archival Description: "In this address to executives of the Home Mission Societies of Christian Friends, sponsored by the American Baptist Assembly, King responds to the question: "How will the oppressed peoples of the world wage their struggle against the forces of injustice?" Dismissing the use of violence as "both impractical and immoral," he endorses the method of nonviolent protest. This "mentally and spiritually aggressive" technique not only avoids "external physical violence," but "seeks to avoid internal violence [to the] spirit." He delivered the same speech on 16 October to the 131st Universalist Convention in Cortland, New York; it was edited for publication in the organization's journal. Significant variations between the Green Lake speech and the article are noted."
1956	December 15	"Desegregation and the Future"	New York, NY	Address Delivered at the General Assembly of the National Council of Churches From the Archival Description: "Referring to his recent experience with segregated dining policies at the Atlanta airport, King claims that equality is not only quantitative but also qualitative, "not only a matter of mathematics and geometry," but "a matter of psychology.""
1956	December 6	"Remember Who You Are"	Washington, D.C. (Howard University)	From the Archival Description: "Dr. King addresses the student body and officials of Howard University with a poignant sermon entitled, "Remember Who You Are." The content of the sermon makes various references between Jesus, Shakespeare and Greek philosophers who sought to identify the mechanisms that made man important to society."
1957	Unknown	"God's Judgment On Western Civilization"	Unknown	This speech is documented as having occurred in 1957 but its content is unknown due its archival status.
1957	January 1	"Facing the Challenge of A New Age," Address Delivered at NAACP Emancipation Day Rally	Atlanta, GA	From the Archival Description: "In celebration of the ninety-fourth anniversary of the Emancipation Proclamation, King addresses seven thousand people at an NAACP rally at Big Bethel AME Church on Auburn Avenue. Atlanta police covering the event reported that people in the church were "over packed, standing on the sidewalks and the basement of the church and every available place.""
1957	February 17	Untitled Speech	Lansing, MI (Veterans Memorial Auditorium)	Donations at the Lansing speech went to the victims of racially motivated bombings of homes and churches.
1957	April 3	"Justice Without Violence"	Waltham, MA (Brandeis University)	From the Archival Description: "Dr. King gave this 1957 address to the Institute of Adult Education at Brandeis University in Boston, Massachusetts."
1957	April 10	"A Realistic Look at the Question of Progress in the Area of Race Relations,"	St. Louis, MO	From the Archival Description: "The Citizens Committee of Greater St. Louis, a federation of several area ministerial groups, sponsored King's address at a Freedom Rally held to raise funds for the MIA. John E. Nance, a Morehouse classmate of Martin Luther King Sr. introduced King, who captivated the "intensely integrated inter-racial audience" of eight thousand people at Kiel Auditorium."
1957	April 25	"The Role of the Church in Facing the Nation's Chief Moral Dilemma"	Nashville, TN	From the Archival Description: "The day after receiving the Social Justice Award from the Religion and Labor Foundation in New York, King addressed the final morning session of the Conference on Christian Faith and Human Relations."
1957	May 17	"Give Us the Ballot"	Washington, D.C.	Main article: Give Us the Ballot
1957	July 14	"Overcoming an Inferiority Complex"	Montgomery, AL	Technically not a speech, though its length and breath are similar to Dr. King's speech format. Moreover, this Sermon, along with his Sermon "Conquering Self-Centeredness", offers a look into how he kept himself leveled as his star rose.
1957	August 11	"Conquering Self-Centeredness"	Montgomery, AL	Combined with Dr. Kings Sermon from July 14, 1957, this Sermon provides a window into how Dr. King managed his personality as his fame grew.
1957	December 4	"The Christian Way of Life in Human Relations"	St. Louis, MO	Address Delivered at the General Assembly of the National Council of Churches From the Archival Description: "In his second of two addresses during the annual meeting of the National Council of the Churches of Christ in the US, King charges that "all too many ministers are still silent while evil rages."1 He calls on church leaders to be "maladjusted" to social injustice and asserts that "the aftermath of nonviolence is the creation of the beloved community, while the aftermath of violence is tragic bitterness.""
1957	December 5	"Some Things We Must Do," Address Delivered at the Second Annual Institute on Nonviolence and Social Change at Holt Street Baptist Church	Montgomery, AL	From the Archival Description: "In a November letter King invited local pastors and their congregations to the December institute marking the second anniversary of the MIA. King described the four-day event as "the school in which our people will be prepared to lead the freedom movement in the spirit of love and non-violence.""
1958	January 9	"This is a Great Time to be Alive"	New York, NY	Address delivered at the Tenth Annual Installation Dinner of the Guardians Association of the Police Department of the City of New York.
1958	January 13	"The Desire-ability to be Maladjusted"	Evanston, IL	Address delivered at Beth Emet The Free Synagogue
1958	March 12	"The Christian Doctrine of Man"	Detroit, MI	Sermon Delivered at the Detroit Council of Churches' Noon Lenten Services From the Archival Description: "On 1 March 1957 Detroit Council of Churches executive director G. Merrill Lenox invited King to preach during the Council's 1958 Noon Lenten series."
1958	April 15	"Crisis in Human Relations"	Evanston, IL	Address delivered at Northwestern University (see citations 25 or 26)
1958	June 27	"Nonviolence and Racial Justice, Address delivered at the Friends General Conference"	Cape May, NJ	Similarly titled to an article Dr. King submitted for publication in the Christian Century, an article released from the King archives for public review, this is similarly named however the content has not been released to the public as of yet (see citation 25 or 26)
1958	August 14	"The Speech at Galilee"	Shreveport, LA	Given at the Galilee Baptist Church in Shreveport, Louisiana. Recorded by Dr. C.O. Simpkins.
1959	September 9	"Divine and Human Mutuality, Man's Helplessness Without God"	Montgomery, AL	From the Archival description: "King offers two possible titles for this handwritten sermon. He criticizes those who rely too much on their own power, as well as those who "wait on God to do everything" and believe they "don't need to do anything about the race problem.""
1959	August 20	Address to the National Bar Association	Milwaukee, WI	Speaking to this association of black lawyers, King delivered a speech covering a wide range of topics.
1959	December 3	Address delivered at the Fourth Annual Institute on Nonviolence and Social Change at Bethel Baptist Church	Los Angeles, CA	From the Archival Description: "In this typescript of his final address as president of the MIA, King summarizes the past year's accomplishments, highlighting attempts to desegregate the city's public schools and parks: "I think this is enough to say to the cynics, skeptics, and destructive critics that the MIA is still in business, and that while it does not have the drama of a bus boycott, it is doing a day to day job that is a persistent threat to the power structure of Montgomery." He outlines the MIA's "threefold task": challenging segregation, suffering and sacrificing for freedom, and making full and constructive use of existing freedoms."
1960	April 10	"Keep Moving from This Mountain," Address at Spelman College	Atlanta, GA	From the Archival Description: "In this Founder's Day address at Spelman College, King identifies four symbolic mountains—relativism, materialism, segregation, and violence—that must be overcome."
1960	September 6	"The Rising Tide of Racial Consciousness", Address at the Golden Anniversary Conference of the National Urban League	New York, NY	From the Archival Description: "In this typed draft of his address, King asserts that 'there need be no essential conflict' between the Urban League's efforts to help 'the Negro adjust to urban living' and the need for 'more militant civil rights organizations' to present a 'frontal attack on the system of segregation'. He advises that 'the NAACP'er must not look upon the Urban Leaguer as a quiet conservative and the Urban Leaguer must not look upon the NAACP'er as a militant troublemaker. Each must accept the other as a necessary partner in the complex yet exciting struggle to free the Negro."
1960	September 25	"The Negro and the American Dream," Excerpt from Address at the Annual Freedom Mass Meeting of the North Carolina State Conference of Branches of the NAACP	Charlotte, NC	Predecessor to the "I Have a Dream Speech"
1961	January 2	"The Negro and the American Dream"	Savannah, GA	From the Archival Description: "In the spring of 1960, African Americans in Savannah, Georgia, began a boycott of the white downtown merchants to protest their segregationist practices.1 Speaking before a capacity crowd in honor of the ninety-eighth anniversary of the Emancipation Proclamation, King calls on protesters to remain nonviolent as they continue their "program of economic withdrawal."
1962	February 12	"If the Negro Wins, Labor Wins"	Bal Harbour, FL (AFL–CIO Convention)	King suggests that black emancipation is also the key to workers' rights. (Some confusion about whether the speech was December 1961 or February 1962.)
1962	May 23	"The Future of Race Relations in the United States"; Speech Delivered at Dartmouth University	Hanover, NH	A speech detailing the challenges facing the Civil Rights Movement up to that point in time.
1962	September 12	Address to the New York State Civil War Centennial Commission	New York, NY	A speech memorable for its commemoration of the Civil War.
1962	September 16	"Levels of Love"	Atlanta, GA	A sermon in which King asks his congregation, and recommends for all, that love should not be conditional, such as a white man only loving "Negroes" on condition they stay segregated.
1962	September 30	"Can A Christian Be a Communist"	Atlanta, GA	From the Archival Description: "While insisting that "no Christian can be a communist," King calls on his congregation to consider communism "a necessary corrective for a Christianity that has been all too passive and a democracy that has been all too inert." Frustrated by the church's unwillingness to take a stand against racial discrimination, he complains, "This morning if we stand at eleven o'clock to sing 'In Christ There Is No East or West,' we stand in the most segregated hour of America.""
1963	April 16	A Reading of the "Letter from a Birmingham Jail"	Birmingham, AL	A digital recording of Dr. King reading his "Letter from a Birmingham Jail".
1963	June 23	The 'Great March on Detroit' speech	Detroit, MI	King's first "I Have A Dream" Speech – Titled, in LP released by Detroit's Gordy records, The Great March to Freedom (excerpt)
1963	August 28	"I Have a Dream"	Washington, D.C.	Main article: I Have a Dream
1963	December 2	"Social Justice and the Emerging New Age"	Kalamazoo, MI (West Michigan University)	A sobering, often somber but optimistic look at the Civil Rights Movement
1963	December 15	Address at the Pilgrimage for Democracy	Atlanta, GA	From the Archival Description: "Dr. King discusses the issues of segregation, poverty and discrimination within the City of Atlanta, in this 1963 speech at the Pilgrimage for Democracy. He explains that although Atlanta was thought to be a place of "racial harmony," the reality of glaring discrimination in Atlanta's schools, restaurants, and housing has left the local Negro community "tired," and hungry for change."
1963	December 15	"Demonstrating Our Unity"	Atlanta, GA	Delivered the same day as his Address at the Pilgrimage for Democracy, little is known about this speech outside the following quote lifted from a paper found on the internet, ""We are unified in segregation just as, one hundred years ago we were unified in slavery; is this the unity we want? The unity of oppression? The unity of discrimination? The unity of poverty and ignorance and want? It is not – it can not – it will not be so!" The item's archival status prevents public digestion of its content.
1964	February 6	"The Summer of Our Discontent" or "The Negro Revolution Why 1963"	New York, NY (The New School)	Given from a chapter in his book, Why We Can't Wait, this speech was thought lost until it was discovered in the archives of the New School.
1964	May 31	"Religious Witness for Human Dignity"	Los Angeles Coliseum	This recording is a forty-minute speech by the Rev. Martin Luther King Jr., which he delivered as the keynote speaker of "Religious Witness for Human Dignity, " a multi-faith event held at the Los Angeles Coliseum on May 31, 1964
1964	June 3	"Religious Witness for Human Dignity"	Goodwin Stadium, Arizona State University and Tanner Chapel AME Church	Martin Luther King Jr.'s speech entitled "Religious Witness for Human Dignity" was presented at Goodwin Stadium, Arizona State University on June 3, 1964. Introduction by ASU President G. Homer Durham. This recording is followed by a brief recording of King's remarks to NAACP supporters at the Tanner AME Church in Phoenix earlier in the same day.
1964	September 13	Comments on John F. Kennedy Delivered at a Berlin Festival	Berlin, Germany	From the Archival Description: "Dr. King gave this speech at the Berlin Freedom Festival in Berlin, West Germany, in memorial to the recently assassinated President John F. Kennedy. Dr. King reflects on the personality, achievements and enormous influence Kennedy had on the world. He highlights Kennedy's commitment to international human rights, which included recognition of Negro rights, and his leadership in concluding the atmospheric nuclear test ban treaty. On June 26, 1963, Kennedy captured the hearts of the citizens of West Germany when he challenged the Soviet Union and proclaimed "Ich bin ein Berliner." This copy of the speech, presumably the version Dr. King read off of when delivering it, features a handwritten conclusion not found on other typed versions." Howard University contains a longer version of this speech in their collection.
1964	November 29	Untitled speech	Dayton, OH	
1964	December 10	Nobel Prize – acceptance speech	Oslo, Norway	
1964	December 11	"The Quest for Peace and Justice"	Oslo, Norway	Nobel laureate lecture
1965	February 11	"Facing the Challenge of a New Age"	East Lansing, MI (Michigan State University)	King also called for new civil rights legislation to aid in the dissolution of discrimination problems in the South. He made particular reference to the Civil Rights Commission and MSU President John A. Hannah, who was appointed chairperson of the Civil Rights Commission in January 1957 by President Dwight Eisenhower, serving until September 1969.
1965	March 1965	"Civil Rights '65: the Right to Vote, the Quest for Jobs"	Atlanta, GA	Contents of this speech is unknown.
1965	March 25	"How Long, Not Long"	steps of Alabama State Capitol	Delivered at the completion of the Selma to Montgomery March. The speech is also known as "Our God Is Marching On!"
1965	May 1	Address delivered at Law Day U.S.A	Philadelphia, PA	
1965	May 23	"How to Deal with Grief and Disappointment"	Atlanta, GA	Contents of this speech are limited to the hand written outline King wrote (cited)
1965	June 6	"Modern Man's Crucial Problem"	Atlanta, GA	
1965	June 14	"Remaining Awake Through a Great Revolution"	Oberlin, OH	Commencement address at Oberlin College
1965	June 15	"Why Are You Here"	Atlanta, GA	A motivation speech, addressing the volunteers of the SCLC's Summer Conference on Community Organizing and Political Education which was almost lost to history.
1965	July 6	"America's Chief Moral Dilemma," Address delivered to the General Synod of United Church of Christ.	Chicago, IL	Contents of this speech are unknown.
1965	July 25	Speech delivered at the Village Green	Winnetka, IL	Winnetkahistory.org. At the invitation of the North Shore Summer Project. Audience estimated at 8–10,000
1965	July 26	Address delivered at the March on Chicago	Chicago, IL	The Speech is listed at 23 pages in the archives, yet its contents are unknown.
1965	August 3	Addresses delivered at two locations in Philadelphia in support of "Desegregation of Girard College"	Philadelphia, PA	Speaking to a crowd gathered outside the closed front gate of the whites-only Girard College: "it is a sad experience... in the city that has been known as the cradle of liberty, that has ... a kind of Berlin Wall to keep the colored children of God out [of] this school". Later, addressing a different crowd in West Philadelphia: "Now is the time to straighten up Girard College!".
1965	August 17	Press Statement on the Watts Riot	Atlanta, GA	King's diagnosis of the cause of the riots in Los Angeles, attributing the riots to the lack of prosperity in the Black community.
1965	October 7	Address to the Illinois AFL-CIO Convention	Springfield, IL	Delves into the side-by-side concerns of organized Labor and the civil rights movement, and how each must join to achieve their goals.
1965	October 11	Address delivered in Crawfordville, GA	Crawfordville, GA	
1965	October 15	Address delivered at the Fiftieth Anniversary of the Women's International League for Peace and Freedom	Philadelphia, PA	Content of Speech is unknown
1965	October 29	"The Dignity of Family Life"	Westchester Country, NY	Content of the Speech is unknown but it is confirmed.
1965	December 10	"Let My People Go"	Hunter College, NYC	A Human Rights Day speech to call for a boycott against South Africa, Rhodesia and Portugal by the United States, Great Britain, France, the Soviet Union, Germany and Japan. Event was a fundraiser for imprisoned black South Africans. King said "The international potential of nonviolence have never been employed."
1965	December 15	"A Great Challenge Derived from a serious Dilemma"	New York, NY	Address to Members of the Hungry Club
1966	January 27	"The Negro Family, a Challenge to National Action"	Chicago, IL	A speech concerning the Black Family in America.
1966	February 2	Address delivered to the New York City Clergy at Riverside Church	New York, NY	Before he delivered Beyond Vietnam, King stopped by Riverside Church to deliver this speech, a speech whose content is unknown to the public.
1966	February 5	"Who Are We"	Atlanta, GA	From the Archival Description: "In this sermon Dr. King contemplates "who are we?" and "what is man?". He differentiates between the pessimistic attitudes of the materialistic understandings of man and the optimistic attitudes of humanistic definitions of man. King also states that man is neither all good nor all bad, but a combination. Man is both an everlasting miracle and mystery."
1966	March 9	"Chicago Wall"; Address at Michigan State University	East Lansing, MI	"I think almost any major northern city can explode if measures are not taken to remove the conditions which led to the seething desperation that brought Watts into being." [Housing developments along Chicago's S. State st. create a] "Berlin Wall situation like nothing I've seen before,"
1966	April 21	Address to the New York City Bar Association	New York, NY	Dr. King speaks on the legal history of the Black Freedom Movement.
1966	April 24	"Making the Best of a Bad Mess"	Atlanta, GA	Sermon dealing with facing challenges in a powerful way.
1966	May 4	"The Social Activist and Social Change"	Atlanta, GA	Address at the Invitational Conference on Social Change and the Role of Behavioral Science.
1966	May 5	"Family Planning – A Special and Urgent Concern"; accepting Planned Parenthood Federation of America's Margaret Sanger Award for "his courageous resistance to bigotry and his lifelong dedication to the advancement of social justice and human dignity."	Washington, D.C.	Due to what he described as "last minute urgent developments in the civil rights movement," King's wife, Coretta Scott King, delivered his speech on his behalf. Before reading his speech, Mrs. King declared, "I am proud tonight to say a word in behalf of your mentor, and the person who symbolizes the ideas of this organization, Margaret Sanger. Because of her dedication, her deep convictions, and for her suffering for what she believed in, I would like to say that I am proud to be a woman tonight."
1966	May 8	"Training Your Child in Love"	Atlanta, GA	Mother's Day sermon delivered at Ebeneezer Church, content is unknown besides the entry provided.
1966	May 18	"Don't Sleep Through the Revolution"	Hollywood, FL	Given as the prestigious Ware Lecture at the General Assembly of the Unitarian Association of Congregations, now the Unitarian Universalist Association of Congregations
1966	June 17	"We Shall Overcome"		
1966	July 15	"The Role of Education in the Civil Rights Movement"	Syracuse, NY (Syracuse University)	Possibly the greatest policy focused speech Dr. King ever delivered!
1966	July 23	"Message of the Riots"	Unknown	Speech Content is unknown but the archival information lists its length as 10 pages.
1966	August 18	"Why I Must March"	Chicago, IL	Address at a Rally, speech content is unknown.
1966	September 19	"Negros in History"	Grenada, MS	Better known as the Grenada, MS speech, content though, is unknown.
1966	September 30	Address to the International Conference of the Radio and Television Directors Association	Chicago, IL	Speech content is unknown
1966	October 6	Statement on the Negro's Political and Economic Power	Atlanta, GA	A statement concerning the powerlessness felt by Black People.
1966	November 14	Address at SCLC Retreat	Frogmore, SC	From the Archival description: "Dr. King addresses the staff of the SCLC at a retreat in Frogmore, South Carolina. He divides his speech into three parts: "whence we have come, where we have come, and where do we go from here." Dr. King thoroughly discusses his thoughts on Communism, the practice of nonviolence, the belief that racism is an "ontological affirmation,"and the weaknesses of Black Power."
1966	November 27	"The Next One Hundred Years"	Atlanta, GA	Address delivered at Morehouse College Centiennial; lost for years, an audio file was found in 1999.
1966	December 6	"Change Must Come"	New York, NY	Address delivered to The United Neighborhood Houses of New York
1966	December 15	Statement and Related Comments of Dr. Martin Luther King Jr. given to the Subcommittee on Executive Reorganization, Committee on Governmental Operations	Washington, D.C.	Dr. King delivers a statement on the Urban Poor, Education Problems in the Inner Cities and the rebalancing of national priorities (to name a few topics covered), before he is questioned by Senator Abram Ribicof and Robert Kennedy.
1967	February 11	"The Domestic Impact of the War in Vietnam"	Chicago, IL	Another predecessor to Dr. King's legendary "Beyond Vietnam" Speech; King mentions the potential future presidency of Ronald Reagan, and also quotes well known Socialist Eugene Deb's at its conclusion.
1967	February 25	"Casualties of the Vietnam War"	Los Angeles, CA (The Nation Institute)	A predecessor to Dr. King's legendary "Beyond Vietnam" Speech, King lists the numerous political and social casualties afflicted onto the American Social/ Political Body by the war's continuation.
1967	March 31	"A Revolution in the Classroom"	Atlanta, GA	Delivered to the Georgia Teacher and Education Association, during the final paragraph, Dr. King states in part "I remember a group of teachers in Selma, Alabama who were tired of waging a hopeless battle within the classroom only to see their children destroyed by the corrupt and racist political system of George Wallace and Jim Class. And one day they decided to meet after school and join their children and their parents by marching in protest ... I knew then the revolution would continue in the classroom".
1967	April 4	"Beyond Vietnam" or the Riverside Church speech	New York, NY	Main article: Beyond Vietnam
1967	April 14	"The Other America"	Stanford, CA	Delivered at Stanford University, Dr. King states in part "But in the final analysis, a riot is the language of the unheard. And what is it that America has failed to hear?" Dr. King gave variations of his "The Other America" speech over the final 12 months of his life; for example, see below for his 14 March 1968 speech at Grosse Pointe Farms, MI.
1967	April 16	Interview on CBS's Face the Nation		A combative interview, important, for its proceeding Dr. King's Beyond Vietnam Speech. Many misconceptions held by the status quo are raised during this interview, yet despite Dr. King's answers, those misconceptions have persisted.
1967	April 30	"Why I Am Opposed to the War in Vietnam"		
1967	May	"To Charter our Course for the Future"	Frogmore, SC	
1967	May 17	The Speech at Sproul Plaza	Berkeley, CA	Best known for its emphasis on the need for a redistribution of economic wealth and political power.
1967	June 18	Interview on ABC's Issues and Answers	New York, NY	Another interview concerning Dr. King's stance on the Vietnam War.
1967	June 25	"To Serve the Present Age"	Los Angeles, CA	Sermon Delivered at Victory Baptist Church, content is unknown.
1967	July 6	Interview on Merv Griffin Show	Hollywood, CA	Interview concerning Dr. King's stance on the Vietnam War.
1967	July 28	Interview with Associated Press	Atlanta, GA	Interview Concerning Operation Breadbasket.
1967	August 15	"The Crisis in America's Cities"	Atlanta, GA	Address at the Eleventh Annual Convention of the Southern Christian Leadership Conference.
1967	August 16	"Where Do We Go from Here?"	Atlanta, GA	Speech to the 10th annual session of the Southern Christian Leadership Conference
1967	August 31	"The Three Evils of Society"; Address at the National Conference for New Politics	Chicago, IL	A speech addressing what King sees as the national illness afflicting the United States.
1967	Sept 1	"The Role of the Behavioral Scientist in the Civil Rights Movement"	Washington, D.C.	Speech delivered at the APA's Annual Convention.
1967	October 30	Statement on the Attack on the First Amendment	Atlanta, GA	Summarized in a quote from the speech "It concerns me that we have placed a weapon for repression of freedom in the very hands of those who have fostered today's malignant disorder of poverty, racism and war."
1967	November 4	Address at the Atlanta Airport	Atlanta, GA	Statement made upon his arrival from Birmingham, AL after being released from jail. King announces that he was invited along with three other Nobel Peace Prize winners to participate in talks in the Soviet Union about ending the war in Vietnam.
1967	November 11	Address to the National Leadership Assembly for Peace	Chicago, IL	Delivered at the University of Chicago
1967	November 20	Massey Lecture #1 - "Impasse in Race Relationships"	Canada	The first in a five part lecture series for the Canadian Broadcast Channel. The speech drawing upon the question of the need for Black Power, the reason for the white backlash and what the inability of the broader society to meet the reasonable demands of Black people says about the society and its Humanitarianism.
1967	November 27	Massey Lecture #2 - "Vietnam"	Canada	The second in a five part lecture series for the Canadian Broadcast Channel, much of the lecture here is combed from his "Beyond Vietnam" presentation.
1967	December 4	Statement Announcing the Poor People's Campaign	Atlanta, GA	The statement announcing the Poor People's Campaign.
1967	December 4	Massey Lecture #3 - "Youth and Social Activism"	Canada	The Third in a five part lecture series for the Canadian Broadcast Channel, explaining the isolation felt within White Communities and the connection between the Black Power Movement and the empowerment felt by White Radicals to seek dramatic change in the society.
1967	December 11	Massey Lecture #4 - "Nonviolence and Social Change"	Canada	The fourth in a five part lecture series for the Canadian Broadcast Channel, discussing the development of nonviolence as a strategy going forward. Much of the language used is combed from an internal report from SCLC, and several speeches delivered by Dr. King during the previous year.
1967	December 25	Massey Lecture #5 - "Christmas Sermon on Peace"	Canada	The fifth and final part of the five part lecture series. Here Dr. King delivers a Sermon at Ebeneezer Baptist Church concerning Peace in the world.
1968	January 7	"What are your New Years Resolutions"	Atlanta, GA	A sermon declaring the importance of making resolutions count for something more than just vain pursuits.
1968	January 16	"The Need to Go to Washington"; Press Conference on the Poor People's Campaign	Atlanta, GA	Conference concerning the evolution of the Poor People's Campaign. The Stanford archival file does not ascribe a name to the press conference, however the long running show MLK Speaks referenced the press conference by this name in Episode 6806.
1968	January 19	"The Future of Integration"	Manhattan, KS (Kansas State University)	He addressed the state of racial inequality in America, the progress made since the time of slavery, and the progress still needed to solve the issue. Elaborating and identifying the history and injustices that had befallen such a large range of our national community, King discussed how the country needed to come to terms with an uncomfortable, yet critical, truth that could no longer be overlooked or pushed aside.
1968	February 7	"In Search for a Sense of Direction"	Atlanta, GA	While preparing for the Poor People's Campaign, he delivered this speech at a SCLC staff retreat, while much was discussed, in his own words, he was attempting to "grapple with this entire question of the "state of the movement"".
1968	February 15	"Why We Must Go to Washington,"; speech by Martin Luther King Jr. at a staff retreat at Ebenezer Baptist Church, February 15, 1968	Atlanta, GA	The only reference to this speech is located in the SCLC archives for MLK speaks, the speech in its entirety ran during Episodes 6807 & 6808.
1968	February 16	"Things are not Right in this Country"	Montgomery, AL	Address at a mass meeting, the context discussed is unknown as the archival information cited has yet to be released to the public.
1968	February 23	Speech Honoring Dr. Dubois	New York, NY	From the Archival description: "The Centennial Address delivered by Nobel laureate Dr. Martin Luther King at Carnegie Hall in New York City, February 23, 1968. The occasion was the International Cultural Evening sponsored by Freedomways magazine on the 100th birthday of Dr. W.E.B. Du Bois and launching an "International Year".
1968	March 4	Statement on the President's Commission	Atlanta, GA	A short rebuke of the President's refusal to speak candidly about the Kerner Commission's findings.
1968	March 14	"The Other America"	Grosse Pointe Farms, MI	"The ultimate logic of racism is genocide. Hitler took his racism to its logical conclusion and six million Jews died."
1968	March 16	"The Other America"	Los Angeles, CA	Speech delivered at the California Democratic Council and recorded by Pacifica Radio on audio tape.
1968	March 25	Conversation with the Sixty-Eighth Annual Convention of the Rabbinical Assembly	Concord Hotel in Kiamesha Lake in the Sullivan County Catskills (New York)	From the Archival description: "The editor of Conservative Judaism introduced this transcription with the following head note; "On the evening of March 25, 1968, ten days before he was killed, Dr. Martin Luther King appeared at the sixty-eighth annual convention of the Rabbinical Assembly. He responded to questions which had been submitted in advance to Rabbi Everett Gendler, who chaired the meeting." Digitized Audio Recording of above transcript can be found here. Introduction begins at 3:03 mark.
1968	March 31	"To Minister to the Valley"	Unknown	Speech delivered by Dr. King at a Ministers Leadership Training Conference. Appeared on Martin Luther King Speaks on the date provided. The Ministers Conference referenced is possibly the same one Dr. King delivered the Closing remarks for in February.

== See also ==
- Bibliography of Martin Luther King Jr.

== Notes ==
- Speech given at McFarlin Auditorium, Southern Methodist University March 17, 1966, drawn from same sources as April 10, 1957 St. Louis, Mo. speech.
