= Bibliography of Martin Luther King Jr. =

The Reverend Bibliography of Martin Luther King Jr.

Personal details
- Born: January 15, 1929 Atlanta, Georgia, U.S.
- Died: April 4, 1968 (aged 39) Memphis, Tennessee, U.S.
- Cause of death: Assassination by gunshot
- Education: Morehouse College (BA); Crozer Theological Seminary (BDiv); Boston University (PhD)
- Occupation: Baptist minister; activist; leader; author

This is a bibliography of works about and principle works by Martin Luther King Jr.

Martin Luther King Jr. (born Michael King Jr.; January 15, 1929 – April 4, 1968) was an American civil rights activist and Baptist minister who was a prominent leader of the civil rights movement from 1955 until his assassination in 1968. He advanced civil rights for people of color in the United States through the use of nonviolent resistance and civil disobedience against Jim Crow laws and other forms of legalized discrimination, which most commonly affected African Americans.

Works listed here are cited in the notes or bibliographies of scholarly sources. Each is published by an academic or major press, written by a recognized expert, or substantially reviewed in scholarly journals; borderline cases are omitted. A selection of primary sources are included. Many of the books below carry their own bibliographies; see the Further reading section for other bibliographies, and the External links section for historical sites, academic sites, and museums.

Citations follow APA style. (Note: Entries are in plain text APA 7 format without templates; templates are used only for reviews and notes.) Book have citations to academic journal or mainstream published reviews when available. For books only partly about the subject, relevant chapter or section titles are provided when useful and available. Translators of the original-language edition are included when possible. In cases where a title or name has appeared with more than one English spelling, the most recent published form is used and a footnote documents any earlier title under which the work appeared.

== Biographies ==
- Branch, T. (1988). Parting the waters: America in the King years, 1954–63. Simon & Schuster.
- Branch, T. (1998). Pillar of fire: America in the King years, 1963–65. Simon & Schuster.
- Branch, T. (2006). At Canaan's edge: America in the King years, 1965–68. Simon & Schuster.
- Bruns, R. (2006). Martin Luther King Jr.: A biography. Greenwood Publishing.
- Dyson, M. E. (2000). I may not get there with you: The true Martin Luther King, Jr. Free Press.
- Eig, J. (2023). King: A life. Farrar, Straus and Giroux.
- Fairclough, A. (1995). Martin Luther King, Jr. University of Georgia Press.
- Frady, M. (2002). Martin Luther King, Jr. Penguin Group.
- Garrow, D. J. (1986). Bearing the cross: Martin Luther King, Jr., and the Southern Christian Leadership Conference. William Morrow.
- Joseph, P. E. (2020). The sword and the shield: The revolutionary lives of Malcolm X and Martin Luther King Jr. Basic Books. (Note: Also listed as The revolutionary lives of Martin Luther King Jr and Malcolm X.)
- Lewis, D. L. (1970). King: A critical biography. Praeger.
- Ling, P. J. (2002). Martin Luther King, Jr. Routledge.
- Oates, S. B. (1982). Let the trumpet sound: The life of Martin Luther King, Jr. Harper & Row.
- Schulke, F., & McPhee, P. O. (1986). King remembered. Norton.
- Sitkoff, H. (2008). King: Pilgrimage to the mountaintop. Hill and Wang.

== Personal life ==
- Farris, C. K. (2009). Through it all. Atria Books.
- King, C. S. (1993). My life with Martin Luther King, Jr. Henry Holt.
- King, M. L. Sr., & Riley, C. (1980). Daddy King: An autobiography. Morrow.
- Parr, P. (2018). The seminarian. Lawrence Hill Books.

== Philosophy and theology ==
- Ansbro, J. J. (1982). Martin Luther King, Jr.: The making of a mind. Orbis Books.
- Ansbro, J. J. (2000). Martin Luther King, Jr.: Nonviolent strategies and tactics for social change. Madison Books.
- Baldwin, L. V. (1991). There is a balm in Gilead: The cultural roots of Martin Luther King, Jr. Fortress Press.
- Baldwin, L. V. (1992). To make the wounded whole: The cultural legacy of Martin Luther King, Jr. Fortress Press.
- Baldwin, L. V. (2010). The voice of conscience: The church in the mind of Martin Luther King, Jr. Oxford University Press.
- Burrow, R. Jr. (2006). God and human dignity: The personalism, theology, and ethics of Martin Luther King, Jr. University of Notre Dame Press.
- Burrow, R. Jr. (2014). Extremist for love: Martin Luther King Jr., man of ideas and nonviolent social action. Fortress Press.
- Chappell, D. L. (2004). A stone of hope: Prophetic religion and the death of Jim Crow. University of North Carolina Press.
- Colaiaco, J. A. (1986). "Martin Luther King, Jr. and the paradox of nonviolent direct action". Phylon, 47 (1), 16. JSTOR 274691
- Cone, J. H. (1987). "Martin Luther King, Jr., and the Third World". The Journal of American History, 74 (2), 455. JSTOR 1900033
- Cone, J. H. (1991). Martin & Malcolm & America: A dream or a nightmare. Orbis Books.
- Dorrien, G. (2018). Breaking white supremacy: Martin Luther King Jr. and the Black social gospel. Yale University Press.
- Downing, F. L. (1986). To see the promised land: The faith pilgrimage of Martin Luther King, Jr. Mercer University Press.
- Fairclough, A. (1983). "Was Martin Luther King a Marxist?". History Workshop Journal, 15 (1), 117–125. doi:10.1093/hwj/15.1.117
- Loggins, J. A., & Douglas, A. J. (2021). Prophet of discontent: Martin Luther King Jr. and the critique of racial capitalism. University of Georgia Press.
- Long, M. G. (2002). Against us, but for us: Martin Luther King, Jr. and the state. Mercer University Press.
- Nojeim, M. J. (2004). Gandhi and King: The power of nonviolent resistance. Praeger.
- Rieder, J. (2008). The word of the Lord is upon me: The righteous performance of Martin Luther King, Jr. Belknap Press of Harvard University Press.
- Shelby, T., & Terry, B. M. (Eds.). (2018). To shape a new world: Essays on the political philosophy of Martin Luther King, Jr. Belknap Press of Harvard University Press.
- Sturm, D. (1990). "Martin Luther King, Jr., as democratic socialist". The Journal of Religious Ethics, 18 (2), 79–105. JSTOR 40015109
- Waldschmidt-Nelson, B. (2012). Dreams and nightmares: Martin Luther King Jr., Malcolm X, and the struggle for Black equality. University Press of Florida.

== Oratory and rhetoric ==
- Bobbitt, D. (2007). The rhetoric of redemption: Kenneth Burke's redemption drama and Martin Luther King Jr.'s "I Have a Dream" speech. Rowman & Littlefield.
- Hansen, D. (2005). The dream: Martin Luther King Jr. and the speech that inspired a nation. HarperCollins.
- Lischer, R. (1995). The preacher King: Martin Luther King, Jr. and the word that moved America. Oxford University Press.
- Miller, K. D. (1990). "Composing Martin Luther King, Jr." PMLA, 105 (1), 70–82. JSTOR 462344
- Miller, K. D. (1992). Voice of deliverance: The language of Martin Luther King, Jr. and its sources. Free Press.
- Rieder, J. (2013). Gospel of freedom: Martin Luther King, Jr.'s Letter from Birmingham Jail and the struggle that changed a nation. Bloomsbury.
- Selby, G. S. (2008). Martin Luther King and the rhetoric of freedom: The Exodus narrative in America's struggle for civil rights. Baylor University Press.
- Sundquist, E. J. (2009). King's dream. Yale University Press.
- Warren, M. A. (2001). King came preaching: The pulpit power of Dr. Martin Luther King, Jr. InterVarsity Press.

== Civil rights movement ==
- Carson, C. (1987). "Martin Luther King, Jr.: Charismatic leadership in a mass struggle". The Journal of American History, 74 (2), 448. JSTOR 1900032
- Eskew, G. T. (1997). But for Birmingham: The local and national movements in the civil rights struggle. University of North Carolina Press.
- Fairclough, A. (1987). To redeem the soul of America: The Southern Christian Leadership Conference and Martin Luther King, Jr. University of Georgia Press.
- Garrow, D. J. (1978). Protest at Selma: Martin Luther King, Jr., and the Voting Rights Act of 1965. Yale University Press.
- Garrow, D. J. (1981). The FBI and Martin Luther King, Jr.: From "Solo" to Memphis. W. W. Norton.
- Honey, M. K. (2007). Going down Jericho Road: The Memphis strike, Martin Luther King's last campaign. W. W. Norton.
- Hooper, H., & Hooper, S. (1999). "The Scripto strike: Martin Luther King's 'valley of problems': Atlanta, 1964–1965". Atlanta History: A Journal of Georgia and the South, XLIII (3), 5–34.
- Jackson, T. F. (2007). From civil rights to human rights: Martin Luther King, Jr., and the struggle for economic justice. University of Pennsylvania Press.
- Kotz, N. (2005). Judgment days: Lyndon Baines Johnson, Martin Luther King, Jr., and the laws that changed America. Houghton Mifflin.
- Laurent, S. (2019). King and the other America: The Poor People's Campaign and the quest for economic equality. University of California Press.
- McKnight, G. D. (1998). The last crusade: Martin Luther King, Jr., the FBI, and the Poor People's Campaign. Westview Press.
- Morris, A. D. (1984). The origins of the civil rights movement: Black communities organizing for change. Free Press.
- Payne, C. M. (1995). I've got the light of freedom: The organizing tradition and the Mississippi freedom struggle. University of California Press.
- Ralph, J. R. Jr. (1993). Northern protest: Martin Luther King, Jr., Chicago, and the civil rights movement. Harvard University Press.

== Assassination and death ==
- Dyson, M. E. (2008). April 4, 1968: Martin Luther King Jr.'s death and how it changed America. Basic Civitas Books.
- Frank, G. (1972). An American death: The true story of the assassination of Dr. Martin Luther King Jr. and the greatest manhunt of our time. Doubleday.
- Pearson, H. (2002). When Harlem nearly killed King: The 1958 stabbing of Dr. Martin Luther King, Jr. Seven Stories Press.
- Risen, C. (2009). A nation on fire: America in the wake of the King assassination. John Wiley & Sons.
- Smiley, T., & Ritz, D. (2014). Death of a king: The real story of Dr. Martin Luther King Jr.'s final year. Little, Brown.

== Historiography and legacy ==
- Alderman, D. H. (2000). "A street fit for a King: Naming places and commemoration in the American South". The Professional Geographer, 52 (4), 672–684. doi:10.1111/0033-0124.00256
- Baldwin, L. V., Burrow, R. Jr., & Fairclough, A. (2013). The domestication of Martin Luther King Jr.: Clarence B. Jones, right-wing conservatism, and the manipulation of the King legacy. Cascade Books.
- Garrow, D. J. (1991). "King's plagiarism: Imitation, insecurity, and transformation". The Journal of American History, 78 (1), 86. JSTOR 2078086
- Hall, J. D. (2005). "The long civil rights movement and the political uses of the past". Journal of American History, 91 (4), 1233. JSTOR 3660172
- Harding, V. G. (1987). "Beyond amnesia: Martin Luther King, Jr., and the future of America". The Journal of American History, 74 (2), 468. JSTOR 1900034
- Kirk, J. A. (2004). "Martin Luther King, Jr." Journal of American Studies, 38 (2), 329–347. doi:10.1017/s0021875804008461
- Kirk, J. A. (Ed.). (2007). Martin Luther King Jr. and the civil rights movement: Controversies and debates. Macmillan Education UK.
- Lentz, R. (1990). Symbols, the news magazines, and Martin Luther King. Louisiana State University Press.
- Ling, P. (1996). "Plagiarism, preaching and prophecy: The legacy of Martin Luther King, Jr. and the persistence of racism [Review]". Ethnic and Racial Studies, 19 (4), 912–916. doi:10.1080/01419870.1996.9993942
- Romano, R. C., & Raiford, L. (Eds.). (2006). The civil rights movement in American memory. University of Georgia Press.
- Thelen, D. (1991). "Becoming Martin Luther King, Jr.: An introduction". The Journal of American History, 78 (1), 11. JSTOR 2078080

== Miscellaneous ==
- Muse, C. (1978). The educational philosophy of Martin Luther King, Jr. University of Oklahoma.
- White, C. (1974). Doctor Martin Luther King, Jr.'s contributions to education as a Black leader (1929–1968). Loyola University of Chicago.

== Primary sources ==
- Carson, C., & Holloran, P. (Eds.). (1998). A knock at midnight: Inspiration from the great sermons of Reverend Martin Luther King, Jr. Warner Books.
- Carson, C. (Ed.). (1992). The papers of Martin Luther King, Jr.: Vol. 1. Called to serve, January 1929 – June 1951. University of California Press.
- Carson, C. (Ed.). (1998). The autobiography of Martin Luther King, Jr. Warner Books.
- King, M. L. Jr. (1958). Stride toward freedom: The Montgomery story. Harper & Brothers.
- King, M. L. Jr. (1963). Strength to love. Harper & Row.
- King, M. L. Jr. (1964). Why we can't wait. Harper & Row.
- King, M. L. Jr. (1967). Where do we go from here: Chaos or community? Harper & Row.
- King, M. L. Jr. (1968). The trumpet of conscience. Harper & Row.
- King, M. L. Jr., King, C. S., & King, D. S. (1998). The Martin Luther King Jr. companion: Quotations from the speeches, essays, and books of Martin Luther King, Jr. St. Martin's Press.
- King, M. L. Jr. (2000). The papers of Martin Luther King, Jr.: Symbol of the movement, January 1957 – December 1958 (C. Carson, P. Holloran, R. Luker, & P. A. Russell, Eds.). University of California Press.
- King, M. L. Jr. (2005). The papers of Martin Luther King, Jr.: Vol. 5. Threshold of a new decade, January 1959 – December 1960 (C. Carson et al., Eds.). University of California Press.
- King, M. L. Jr., & King, C. S. (2008). The words of Martin Luther King Jr. (2nd ed.). Newmarket Press.
- King, M. L. Jr. (2015). The radical King (C. West, Ed.). Beacon Press.
- Washington, J. M. (Ed.). (1986). A testament of hope: The essential writings of Martin Luther King, Jr. Harper & Row.

== See also ==
- List of civil rights leaders
- List of peace activists
- Sermons and speeches of Martin Luther King Jr.
