= Shabazz (name) =

Shabazz (Arabic: شَبَازّ, romanized: Shabāzz) is the name of a legendary Black architect whose tribe, according to the doctrine of the Nation of Islam (NOI), founded the populations of Africa. It is similar to the Persian name Shahbaz.

Malcolm X adopted the name upon joining the NOI. Born Malcolm Little, he was signing letters as "Malachi Shabazz" by 1949, before taking the name "Malcolm X". After returning from his pilgrimage to Mecca, he finally adopted the title and name El-Hajj Malik El-Shabazz, seen as symbolic of his spiritual journey to traditional Islam. The surname was borne by his wife Betty Shabazz and his children, and has also been adopted by unrelated persons.

== Origin ==
A 1994 article in The American Muslim claims that the name is from the Arabic words sha‘b (Arabic: شَعْب, lit. 'a people'), and ‘azz (Arabic: عَزّ, lit. 'mighty or glorious'). There is also a similar (but etymologically unrelated) Persian name, Shahbâz, meaning "royal falcon". Indicating "royalty and nobility", the name is popular with Bosnian, Turkish, Indian and Pakistani Muslims.

In his book Message to the Blackman in America, Elijah Muhammad wrote that African Americans (then called Negroes) are descended from an ancient tribe by that name:

[God] has declared that we [the so-called Negroes] are descendants of the Asian Black Nation and the tribe of Shabazz.

== People ==
Notable people with the name include:

=== The family of Malcolm X ===
- Malcolm X or El-Hajj Malik El-Shabazz (1925–1965), an American Muslim minister and human rights activist
- Betty Shabazz (1993–1997), his wife
- Attallah Shabazz (born 1958), his daughter
- Ilyasah Shabazz (born 1962), his daughter
- Malcolm Shabazz (1984–2013), his grandson
- Qubilah Shabazz (born 1960), his daughter

=== Rappers ===
A number of rappers have adopted "Shabazz" as part of their stage names to express an affinity with Malcolm X, the Nation of Islam, or the Black power movement more broadly.

- Shabazz Palaces (Ishmael Butler of Digable Planets)
- Shabazz the Disciple (born 1973), a Wu-Tang Clan affiliate
- Lakim Shabazz of Flavor Unit.

=== Others ===
- Abdulalim A. Shabazz (born Lonnie Cross, 1927–2014), professor of mathematics
- Ahmad Uthman Shabazz, respondent in O'Lone v. Estate of Shabazz U.S. Supreme Court case
- Jamel Shabazz, documentary photographer
- John C. Shabaz (1931–2012), United States federal judge
- K. Malik Shabazz or Ron Killings (born 1972), American professional wrestler
- Malik Zulu Shabazz (born 1966), leader of the New Black Panther Party
- Menelik Shabazz (1954–2021), Barbados-born British film director
- Michael Shabaz (born 1987), American tennis player
- Shabazz Muhammad (born 1992), American basketball player
- Shabazz Napier (born 1991), American/Puerto-Rican basketball player
- Walker Shabazz-Edwards (born 2007), Guyanese footballer

=== Fictional characters ===
- A character named Shabazz K. Milton Berle appeared in the TV series The Boondocks, in the episode "The Passion of Reverend Ruckus".

== See also ==
- Shabazz (disambiguation)
