= Stepping Into Tomorrow (play) =

Musical by civil rights leaders' daughters

Stepping Into Tomorrow is a musical by Yolanda King and Attallah Shabazz, the daughters of Martin Luther King Jr. and Malcolm X, respectively. They co-wrote the play in 1980, after first meeting in 1979.

== Plot ==
The play follows six people attending their high school reunion. It explores issues that include drugs, suicide, teenage pregnancy and peer pressure.

== Productions ==
Stepping Into Tomorrow was performed at schools, colleges, and churches across the United States. Actors that performed in the play include Taurean Blacque, Antonio Fargas, Sherri Poitier (daughter of actor Sidney Poitier) and Gina Belafonte (daughter of singer Harry Belafonte).

In 1990, there was a 10th anniversary performance of the play. The widows of Martin Luther King Jr. and Malcolm X were in attendance.
