= Radio (LL Cool J album) =

1985 studio album by LL Cool J

Studio album by LL Cool J
- Released: November 18, 1985
- Recorded: 1984–1985
- Studio: Chung King (Chinatown)
- Genres: Hip-hop; new-school hip-hop
- Length: 47:06
- Labels: Def Jam; Columbia
- Producers: Rick Rubin; Jazzy Jay

LL Cool J chronology
Radio (1985)	Bigger and Deffer (1987)

Singles from Radio
- 1. "I Can't Live Without My Radio" Released: October 6, 1985; 2. "You'll Rock" Released: 1985; 3. "I Can Give You More" Released: 1985; 4. "Rock the Bells" Released: September 22, 1986

Radio is the debut studio album by American rapper LL Cool J, released on November 18, 1985, by Def Jam Recordings and Columbia Records. It was also Def Jam's first LP record release. It was recorded at Chung King Studios in New York City with producer Rick Rubin, who provided a sparse, minimal production style. Radio also features a sound punctuated by DJ scratching, often brief samples, a near lack of any melody, and emphasis of the downbeat. LL's aggressive b-boy lyrics explored themes of inner city culture, teenage promiscuity, and braggadocio raps.

A significant commercial success for a hip-hop record at the time, Radio became a Billboard chart hit and sold over 500,000 copies within its first five months of release. By 1989, it had been certified platinum by the Recording Industry Association of America (RIAA) for sales surpassing one million copies in the United States. Initial reception of Radio was generally positive, with praise given to LL's lyricism and Rubin's production. It has since been recognized by critics as LL Cool J's best album.

Radio marked a moment in hip-hop's culture and history, reflecting the new-school and ghettoblaster subculture in the United States during the mid-1980s. Its success contributed to the displacement of the old-school with the new-school form and to the genre's mainstream success during this period. It was also a career breakthrough for LL and Rubin.

== Background and recording ==
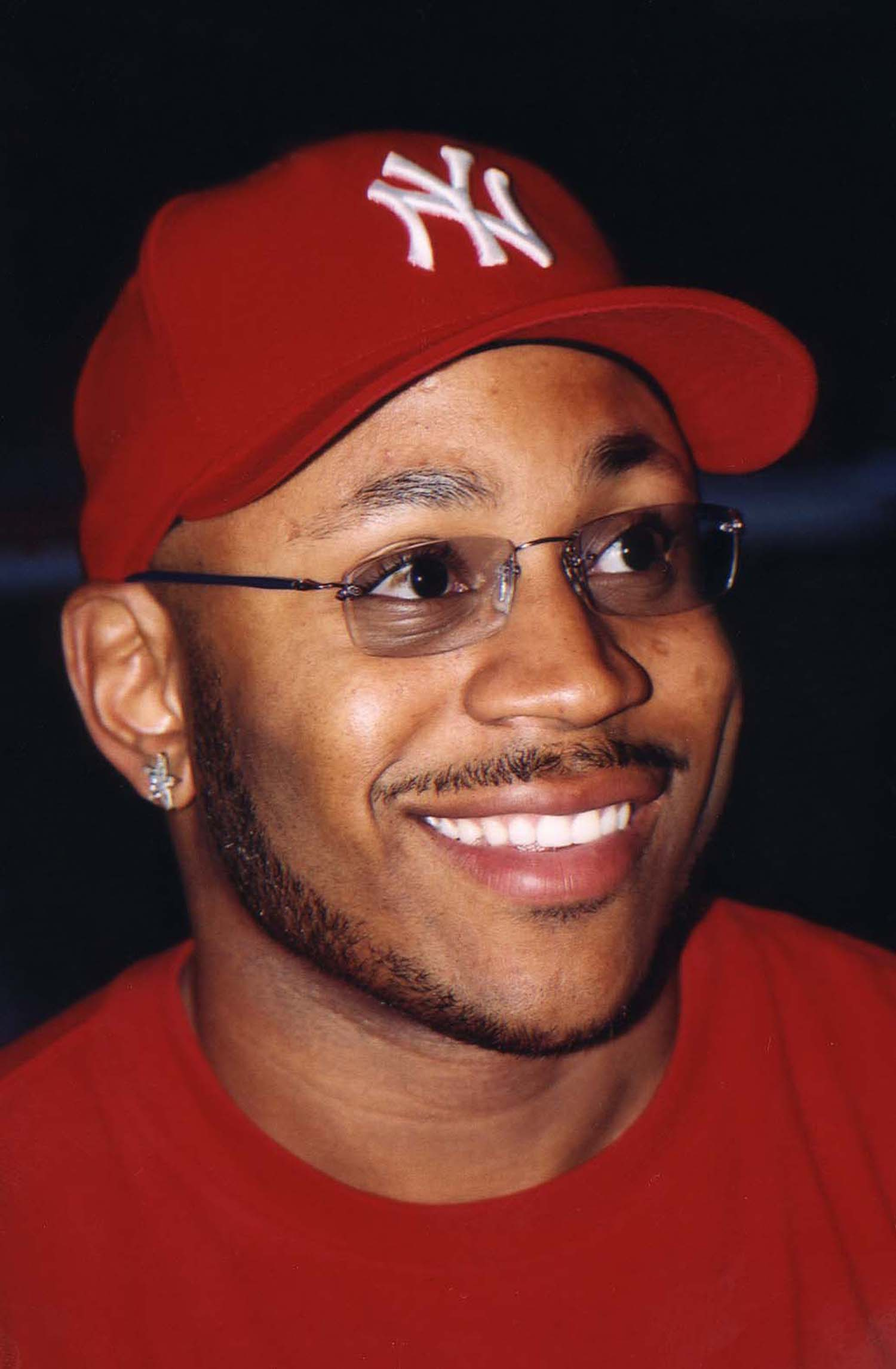
LL Cool J in 1999

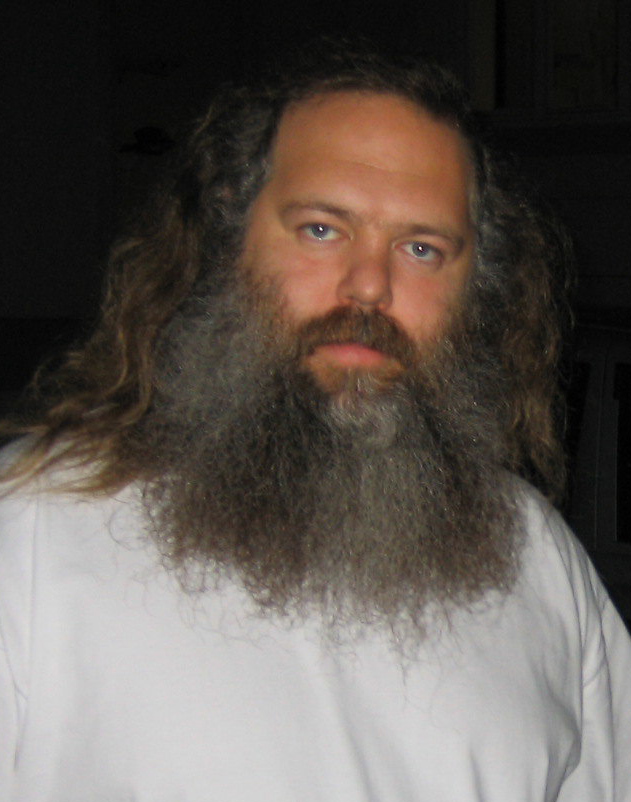
Rick Rubin in 2006

In March 1984, when New York University student Rick Rubin and promoter-manager Russell Simmons founded the then-independent record label Def Jam Recordings, 16 year–old St. Albans, Queens, native James Todd Smith was creating demo tapes in his grandparents' home. His grandfather, a jazz saxophonist, purchased him $2,000 worth of stereo equipment, including two turntables, an audio mixer and an amplifier. Smith later discussed his childhood background and rapping, stating that "By the time I got that equipment, I was already a rapper. In this neighborhood, the kids grow up in rap. It's like speaking Spanish if you grow up in an all-Spanish house. I got into it when I was about 9, and since then all I wanted was to make a record and hear it on the radio." By using the mixing table he had received from his grandfather, Smith produced and mixed his own demos and sent them to various labels throughout New York City, including Def Jam.

Under his new stage name, LL Cool J (an acronym for "Ladies Love Cool James"), Smith was signed by Def Jam, which led to the release of his first official record, the twelve-inch single "I Need a Beat" (1984). The single was a hard-hitting, streetwise b-boy song with spare beats and ballistic rhymes. Smith later discussed his search for a label, stating "I sent my demo to many different companies, but it was Def Jam where I found my home." That same year, Smith made his professional debut concert performance at Manhattan Center High School. In a later interview, LL recalled the experience, stating "They pushed the lunch room tables together and me and my DJ, Cut Creator, started playing. ... As soon as it was over there were girls screaming and asking for autographs. Right then and there I said, 'This is what I want to do'." LL's debut single sold over 100,000 copies and helped establish both Def Jam as a label and Smith as a rapper. The commercial success of "I Need a Beat"—along with the Beastie Boys' "Rock Hard" (1984)—helped Def Jam to a distribution deal with Columbia Records the following year.

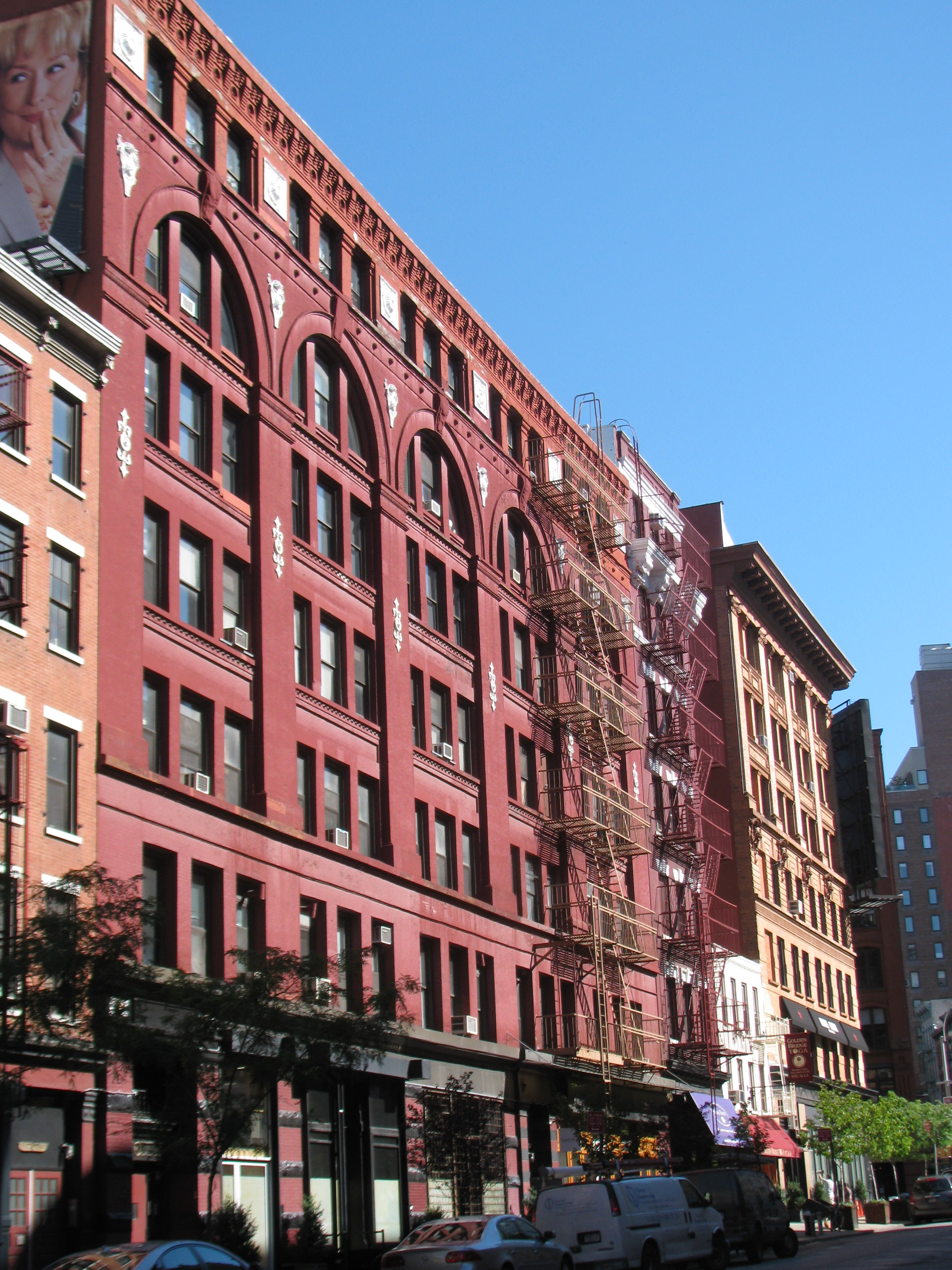
241 Centre Street in New York, where Chung King Studios was located

LL dropped out of Andrew Jackson High School in Queens to record his first studio album, also the first LP to be issued by Def Jam. Recording sessions for Radio took place at Chung King Studios in Chinatown, Manhattan, under Rubin's direction. Rubin recalled that "There were no expectations. Everything was done through trial and error. As long as it sounded good, it didn't matter how technically wrong it might be."

Notable among the personnel was LL's DJ Jay Philpot, better known as Cut Creator. A Queens native and former trombonist, Philpot met LL at a block party, and they began performing together. The audio mastering was handled by engineer Herb Powers Jr. at 130 West 42nd Street at Frankford-Wayne Mastering Labs, and Radio was set for release in November 1985, containing a dedication in the liner notes to LL's mother and grandparents. Radio's release had been anticipated by many hip-hop fans following LL's appearance in the hip-hop movie Krush Groove, which was based on the beginnings of Def Jam and featured the lead single "I Can't Live Without My Radio" from Radio.

== Music and lyrics ==
Radio's production, handled entirely by Rick Rubin with a remix by DJ Jazzy Jay, has been noted by critics and music writers for Rubin's minimalist style and stripped-down aggressiveness. Steve Huey of AllMusic described the production for Radio as "bare-bones", while calling the instrumentation "basically just a cranked-up beatbox." The sound of Radio is mostly punctuated by DJ scratching and features occasional brief samples, which emphasize a downbeat. In summing up the musical style of Radio, Huey stated "The result is rap at its most skeletal, with a hard-hitting, street-level aggression that perfectly matches LL's cocksure teenage energy."

"I Can't Live Without My Radio"
The ghetto-blaster anthem features sparse drum machine beats and a minimalist production.

"Rock the Bells"
The boastful track samples heavy rhythmic bass lines with chiming guitar.

The lyrical themes regarding the culture and the way of life of inner city youth that surface in Radio, including the growing and popular b-boy attitude ("I Can't Live Without My Radio", "Rock the Bells") and teenage promiscuity ("Dear Yvette"), along with LL's "teenage energy", as described by writer Nelson George, helped appeal to a younger music audience and were essential to Radio's commercial success. LL's lyricism on Radio is highlighted by clever disses, playful boasts and braggadocio raps. Columnist Stephen Holden of The New York Times described LL Cool J as "a brawny young giant with the animal magnetism and amiable self-assurance of the young Muhammad Ali." "I Want You" and "I Can Give You More" have been recognized by listeners of hip-hop as the first hip-hop ballads, and have been cited likewise by several music writers and critics.

Author of the 1985 book Fresh: Hip Hop Don't Stop, writer Nelson George further elaborated on the appeal of Radio to listeners at the time, describing LL as a "minimalist homeboy who knows his beats", and stating "You can call it rap, hip hop or street, but it really is a way of hearing music—and partying hard—that expresses the experiences and attitudes of a great many inner city kids. L.L. Cool J is one of the best young talkologists around, because he speaks directly to and about his generation over large beats that recall Run-D.M.C., Trouble Funk, James Brown, and funky little bits of AC/DC and Yes ... This teenage music is built around beats, but not just any old beats. It is all about a beat with style, with personality, and L.L. Cool J has plenty of both."

== Release and reception ==
Professional ratings
Review scores
Source	Rating
AllMusic	5/5 stars
Christgau's Record Guide	B+
MusicHound R&B	4.5/5
Q	4/5 stars
RapReviews	8/10
The Rolling Stone Album Guide	4/5 stars
The Source	5/5 stars
Spin Alternative Record Guide	9/10
The Village Voice	B+

Released November 18, 1985, on Def Jam Recordings in the United States, Radio earned a significant amount of commercial success and sales for a hip-hop record at the time. It sold over 500,000 copies in its first five months, eventually selling over 1 million copies by 1988, according to the Recording Industry Association of America. Radio peaked at number 6 on the Top R&B/Hip-Hop Albums chart and at number 46 on the Billboard 200 albums chart. It entered the Top R&B/Hip-Hop Albums chart on December 28, 1985, and remained there for forty-seven weeks, while also entering the Pop Albums chart on January 11, 1986. Radio remained on the chart for thirty-eight weeks. By 1989, it had earned platinum status from the Recording Industry Association of America (RIAA), after earning a gold certification in the United States on April 14, 1986, with sales exceeding one million copies.

Radio received positive reviews from both street- and dance-music aficionados and mainstream music critics, including Robert Christgau from The Village Voice, who described it in a January 1986 article as "the most engaging and original rap album of the year". LL Cool J's aggressive rapping and Rick Rubin's stripped-down production were praised by critics who also agreed that LL's lyrics set a new standard for MC's at the time. The songs' lyrics were favored by critics who described LL's songwriting as clever and fun. Connie Johnson of the Los Angeles Times said that he is an integral artist of hip-hop's "second generation" because of his "razor-sharp wit". Rolling Stone magazine's Debby Bull was impressed by his songwriting and how its originality lies in the ballads, even though "it's the sassier, dance-worthy songs that make this record such an irresistible party." Its critical success would later be compared to LL's subsequent discography, which was not as critically successful as Radio. In his review for the Trouser Press, Ira Robbins called Radio a "primary classic of hip-hop's original commercial surge" and went on to write:

From the monster boombox on the cover to grooves like 'I Can't Live Without My Radio' and 'You Can't Dance', LL touches all the right cultural totems, delivering his sharp-tongued lines with adolescent urgency and a deliciously snotty attitude. The rhythm tracks are stripped-down and aggressive; raps on familiar subjects sidestep clichés and are clever enough to warrant repeated listening.

Since its initial reception, Radio has been viewed by fans and critics as LL Cool J's best work and one of hip-hop's best albums. Some critics and writers have given more praise to Rubin's production, noting its importance. Yahoo Music's Frank Meyer said that Radio was "one of the earliest records, along with Run-DMC, to combine the vocal approach of rap with the musical arrangements and riffing of rock 'n' roll. 'I Can't Live Without My Radio' is a hip-hop classic and this album set the standard for East Coast rap for a long time."

Radio was later ranked at number 2 on Ego Trip's "Hip Hop's Greatest Albums (1979–1985)" list, number 69 on Rolling Stone's "100 Best Albums of the 80s", and number 71 on Blender's "100 Greatest American Albums of All Time" list. In 2003, Rolling Stone ranked it number 478 on its list of The 500 Greatest Albums of All Time; it was ranked number 470 in a revised list in 2012. The magazine also included Radio in their 1997 issue's list of "The Essential 200 Rock Records". In 1998, Radio was selected as one of The Source magazine's "100 Best Rap Albums".

== Legacy and influence ==
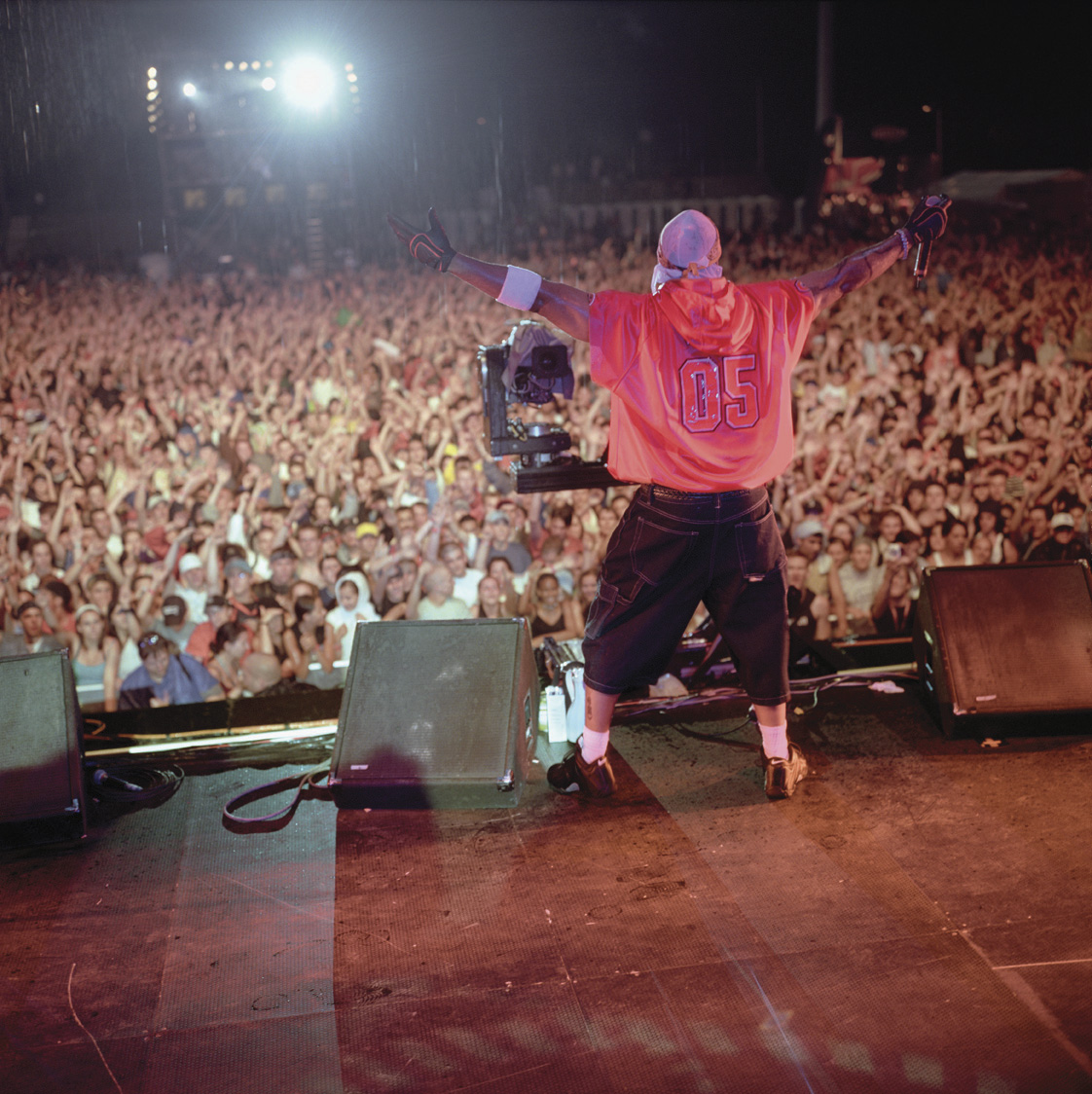
LL Cool J performing in Stuttgart, Germany, in 2001

With the breakthrough success of "I Need a Beat" and Radio, LL Cool J became one of the first hip-hop acts to achieve mainstream success along with Kurtis Blow and Run-DMC. Gigs at larger venues were offered to LL as he would join the 1986–'87 Raising Hell tour, opening for Run-DMC and Beastie Boys. Another milestone of LL's popularity was his appearance on American Bandstand as the first hip-hop act on the show.

Radio's success also helped in contributing to Rick Rubin's credibility and reputation as a record producer. Radio, along with Raising Hell (1986) and Licensed to Ill (1986), would form a trilogy of New York City-based, Rubin-helmed albums that helped to diversify hip-hop. Rubin's production credit on the back cover reads "REDUCED BY RICK RUBIN", referring to his minimalist production style, which gave Radio its stripped-down and gritty sound. This style would serve as one of Rubin's production trademarks and would have a great impact on future hip-hop productions. Rubin's production, before his exit from Def Jam to Los Angeles, helped solidify his legacy as a hip-hop pioneer and establish his reputation in the music industry.

Radio's release coincided with the growing new-school scene and subculture, which also marked the beginning of golden age hip-hop and the replacement of old-school hip-hop. This period of hip-hop was marked by the end of the disco stylings of old-school, which had flourished prior to the mid-80s, and the rise of a new style featuring "ghettoblasters". Radio served as one of the earliest records, along with Run-DMC's debut album, to combine the vocal approach of hip-hop and rapping with the musical arrangements and riffing sound of rock music, pioneering the rap rock hybrid sound.

The emerging new-school scene was initially characterized by drum machine-led minimalism, often tinged with elements of rock, as well as boasts about rapping delivered in an aggressive, self-assertive style. In image as in song, the artists projected a tough, cool, street b-boy attitude. These elements contrasted sharply with the 1970s P-Funk and disco-influenced outfits, live bands, synthesizers and party rhymes of acts prevalent in 1984, rendering them old-school. In contrast to the lengthy, jam-like form predominant throughout old-school hip-hop ("King Tim III (Personality Jock)", "Rapper's Delight", "The Breaks"), new-school artists tended to compose shorter songs that would be more accessible and had potential for radio play, and record more cohesive albums than their old-school counterparts, as typified by Radio. A leading example of new-school hip-hop is "I Can't Live Without My Radio", a loud, defiant declaration of public loyalty to his boom box, which The New York Times described as "quintessential rap in its directness, immediacy and assertion of self". It was featured in Krush Groove, which was based on the rise of Def Jam and new-school acts such as Run-DMC and the Fat Boys.

The energy and hardcore delivery of rapping featured on Radio, as well as other new-school recordings by artists such as Run-DMC, Schoolly D, T La Rock and Steady B, proved to be influential to golden age hip-hop acts such as Boogie Down Productions and Public Enemy. The decline of old-school hip-hop also led to the closing of Sugar Hill Records, one of hip-hop's earliest labels and coincidentally rejected LL's demo tape. As Radio served as an example of an expansion of hip-hop's artistic possibilities, its commercial success and distinct sound soon led to an increase in multi-racial audiences and listeners, adding to the legacy of it and hip-hop as well. The JVC RC-M90 boombox depicted on the front cover can be seen at the Rock and Roll Hall of Fame in Cleveland, OH, USA.

== Track listing ==
All tracks produced by Rick Rubin, except "I Need a Beat", produced by Rubin and Jazzy Jay.

All tracks are written by James Todd Smith and Rubin.

Side one
No.	Title	Length
1.	"I Can't Live Without My Radio"	5:28
2.	"You Can't Dance"	3:37
3.	"Dear Yvette"	4:07
4.	"I Can Give You More"	5:08
5.	"Dangerous"	4:40
6.	"Untitled" (featuring El Shabazz)	1:16
Total length:		24:16

Side two
No.	Title	Length
7.	"Rock the Bells"	4:01
8.	"I Need a Beat (Remix)"	4:32
9.	"That's a Lie" (featuring Russell Rush)	4:42
10.	"You'll Rock"	4:44
11.	"I Want You"	4:51
Total length:		22:50 47:06

Notes

- The untitled freestyle track is sometimes titled "El Shabazz", after its guest artist. It is alternatively titled "Three the Hard Way" on other pressings. Some pressings combine the track with "Dangerous". An extended version of the track that runs 3:24 is available as the b-side of “Rock the Bells,” particularly on Def Jam/Columbia/CBS 38-05840.

== Personnel ==
Musicians

- James Todd Smith – vocals (Credited as L.L. Cool J)
- Jay Philpot – DJ (Credited as DJ Cut Creator)
- Russell Rush – guest vocals track 9

Production

- Rick Rubin – producer
- Jazzy Jay – producer on track 8
- Steve Ett – recording engineer
- Steve Byram – album cover design
- Nelson George – liner notes
- Herb Powers Jr. – mastering engineer
- Josh Cheuse, Janette Beckman – liner photography (Credited on the reissue)

== Charts ==
Chart (1985)	Peak position
UK Albums Chart	71
US Billboard 200	46
US Billboard Top R&B/Hip-Hop Albums	6

== Certifications ==
Region	Certification	Certified units/sales
United States (RIAA)	Platinum	1,000,000^{^}
^{^} Shipments figures based on certification alone.

== See also ==
- Album era

== Bibliography ==
- Brian Coleman (2007). Check The Technique. 2nd ed. Villard/Random House, New York, NY. ISBN 978-0-8129-7775-2.
- Nelson George (1985). Fresh: Hip Hop Don't Stop. Random House, New York, NY. ISBN 978-0-394-54487-8.
- Kurtis Blow (1997). Kurtis Blow Presents: The History of Rap, Vol. 1 & 2. CD liner booklet. Rhino / WEA International Inc.
- Nelson George, James Todd Smith (1990). Radio (reissue). CD liner booklet. Def Jam Recordings.
- David Toop (2000). Rap Attack. 3rd ed. Serpent's Tail, London, UK. ISBN 978-1-85242-627-9.
- Peter Shapiro (2005). Rough Guide to Hip Hop. 2nd ed. Rough Guides, London, UK. ISBN 978-1-84353-263-7.
