= I Can't Live Without My Radio =

Single by LL Cool J

from the album Radio
- B-side: "I Can Give You More"
- Released: October 6, 1985
- Studio: Chung King (New York City)
- Genre: Golden age hip-hop
- Length: 5:27
- Label: Def Jam; Columbia
- Songwriters: James Todd Smith; Rick Rubin
- Producers: Rick Rubin; LL Cool J

LL Cool J singles chronology
"I Need a Beat" (1984)	"I Can't Live Without My Radio" (1985)	"I Can Give You More" (1985)

Official audio
- "I Can't Live Without My Radio" on YouTube

"I Can't Live Without My Radio" is the lead single from LL Cool J's debut studio album, Radio. It was released in 1985 for Def Jam Recordings and was both written and produced by LL Cool J and Rick Rubin. It is a love song to the boombox. The song reached No. 15 on the Billboard R&B singles chart. "I Can't Live Without My Radio" was released with the follow-up single "I Can Give You More". It is the first Def Jam single distributed through Columbia Records.

A section of the song performed by LL Cool J is featured during the auditions process in the musical comedy-drama film Krush Groove (1985). This part was created for LL Cool J and another female singer, Nayobe, as an excuse to include their music in the motion picture. LL Cool J himself also has a line, "Box!" (his only line in the movie).

The song was featured in the film Get Rich or Die Tryin', which stars rapper 50 Cent, and was also featured in the soundtrack of the video game True Crime: New York City (both 2005).

It is number 12 on VH1's 100 Greatest Songs of Hip Hop.

The line from the song "And your Radio's Def when my Record's on" is featured in the chorus of the Eazy-E song "Radio", featured on his debut studio album, Eazy-Duz-It (1988).

The song was later covered by Minnesota band Halloween, Alaska, and also by English post-punk band World Domination Enterprises.

== Track listing ==
=== A-side ===
1. "I Can Give You More" – 4:16

=== B-side ===
1. "I Can't Live Without My Radio" – 4:12
