= Malcolm Shabazz =

Grandson of Malcolm X (1984–2013)

- Shabazz in 2010
- Born: Malcolm Latif Shabazz; October 8, 1984; Paris, France
- Died: May 9, 2013 (aged 28); Mexico City, Mexico
- Cause of death: Murder
- Resting place: Ferncliff Cemetery
- Other name: Malcolm Shabazz Jr.
- Children: 2, including Ilyasah Shabazz
- Parent(s): Qubilah Shabazz; L. A. Bouasba
- Relatives: Malcolm X (grandfather); Betty Shabazz (grandmother); Attallah Shabazz (aunt); Ilyasah Shabazz (aunt)

Malcolm Latif Shabazz (October 8, 1984 – May 9, 2013) was the grandson of civil rights activists Malcolm X and Betty Shabazz, through their daughter, Qubilah Shabazz. Malcolm Shabazz made headlines for multiple arrests during his life, including setting a fire that killed his grandmother, Betty. He was murdered in Mexico on May 9, 2013, at the age of 28.

== Childhood ==
Malcolm Shabazz was born in Paris on October 8, 1984. His father, L. A. Bouasba, was an Algerian Muslim and his mother, Qubilah Shabazz, an African American Quaker and former Muslim, is the second daughter of Malcolm X. His mother is of African-American, African-Grenadian, English and Scottish descent. He was the first male descendant of Malcolm X. According to Malcolm, he never met his father. Other sources say Malcolm knew his father, but they had little contact with one another.

When Malcolm was a few months old, he and his mother moved to Los Angeles. A little while later, they moved to New York City and then Philadelphia. One landlord there remembered frequently having to let young Malcolm into the apartment because his mother was not at home. Malcolm showed some evidence of disturbance as a child. As a three-year-old, he reportedly set fire to his shoes. He brought a knife to school in the third grade. About the same time, he suffered from delusions and was hospitalized for a short time.

During the early 1990s, Malcolm often stayed with his grandmother Betty and his aunts in New York, while his mother Qubilah lived with various friends. In 1994, Malcolm moved with his mother to Minneapolis. She was being drawn into a plot to assassinate Louis Farrakhan by an FBI informant, Michael Fitzpatrick. Malcolm saw in Fitzpatrick the father figure he had never known, calling him "my dad".

In January 1995, Qubilah was charged with trying to hire an assassin to kill Farrakhan. She accepted a plea agreement with respect to the charges, in which she maintained her innocence but accepted responsibility for her actions. Under the terms of the agreement, she was required to undergo psychological counseling and treatment for drug and alcohol abuse for a two-year period in order to avoid a prison sentence. For the duration of her treatment, ten-year-old Malcolm was sent to live with Betty at her apartment in Yonkers, New York.

Malcolm visited Qubilah in December 1996 in San Antonio, where she was undergoing treatment. She had remarried, and Malcolm quickly bonded with his stepfather. The marriage soon ended; Malcolm and his mother began to fight, sometimes physically. On February 26, 1997, she called the police saying she wanted him committed to a mental hospital. After a brief stay, Malcolm was released. In April, he called the police and reported that they had been in a fight. His mother said she was going to place him in foster care, but sent Malcolm back to New York on April 26 to live with his grandmother instead.

== Arson and juvenile detention ==
On June 1, 1997, Malcolm Shabazz, then twelve years of age, started a fire in Betty Shabazz's apartment. She suffered burns over 80 percent of her body. The police found Malcolm wandering the streets, barefoot and reeking of gasoline. Betty Shabazz died of her injuries on June 23, 1997. At a hearing, experts described Malcolm as psychotic and schizophrenic. He was also described as "brilliant but disturbed."

Despite opposition from both Shabazz's defense attorneys and the state prosecutors, the presiding Family Court judge did not close the case to the press, citing his desire "to preserve the integrity of public proceedings.'' Family Court cases in the state were frequently closed to protect children in sensitive cases, though the judge's decision in the Shabazz case came two weeks after the state's Chief Judge announced new rules to keep Family Court cases open to the public.

Former New York City Mayor David Dinkins and former Manhattan Borough President Percy Sutton represented Malcolm Shabazz in his Westchester Family Court trial. At the end of each hearing, Dinkins and Sutton would make a "motion to hug" Shabazz before he was handcuffed, shackled, and led back to detention. The two lawyers accepted that he started the fire, but argued he intended no real harm to his grandmother; throughout the trial, Dinkins and Sutton tried to arrange an alternative to youth detention that would satisfy their security, therapeutic, and academic standards by visiting locations from North Carolina to Upstate New York.

Shabazz pleaded guilty and was sentenced to 18 months of juvenile detention at Hillcrest Education Center in Pittsfield, MA for manslaughter and arson, with possible annual extensions until his 18th birthday.

After his 18-month sentence elapsed, Shabazz was transferred to Leake & Watts, another treatment center, in Yonkers, NY. Following two attempted escapes from the Yonkers facility, officials transferred him to Woodfield Cottage in Valhalla, NY. He and another resident escaped the facility within a month. Though the teenager did not commit any additional crimes while escaped for the afternoon, Westchester County Attorney Alan Scheinkman decided to prosecute him due to the "alarm" the search caused in the local community. Shabazz was eventually released after four years.

In a 2003 interview with The New York Times, Shabazz, then aged 18, gave his version of the fire and the events leading up to it. He explained that he had been unhappy living in New York with his grandmother and had stated: "Being bad, doing anything to get them to send me back to my mother. Then I got the idea to set the fire." Expressing remorse for the event, Shabazz continued:

I set a fire in the hallway, and I didn't think the whole thing through thoroughly, but she didn't have to run through that fire ... There was another way out of the house from her room. I guess what she thought was, I was stuck, and she had to run and get me because it was in front of my room as well. She ran through the fire. I did not picture that happening, that she would do that.

Expressing regret for his actions, Malcolm said he would sit on his jail cot and ask for a sign of forgiveness from his dead grandmother. Shabazz said:

I just wanted her to know I was sorry and I wanted to know she accepted my apology, that I didn't mean it. But I would get no response, and I really wanted that response.

In the same interview, Shabazz also dismissed the child psychiatrist's diagnosis of him at his trial that he was a paranoid schizophrenic, saying that he had only "made up" a story about hearing voices in his childhood "to get attention".

== Adulthood ==
Following his release, Shabazz lived for a time with his aunt, Ilyasah Shabazz. He was arrested in 2002 for stealing $100. He pleaded guilty to attempted robbery and was sentenced to three and a half years in prison. Shabazz was arrested again in 2006, for punching a hole in a store's glass window.

In 2010, Shabazz made the Hajj to Mecca. He later converted to Shia Islam and visited the Sayyidah Zainab Mosque in Damascus.

In February 2013, Iranian state-controlled Press TV reported that Shabazz had been arrested by the FBI while en route to Iran. The story was widely reported, but, two days later, Shabazz's family announced that the Press TV report was incorrect. They said Shabazz had been arrested, but his arrest had nothing to do with the FBI or Iran.

== Death ==
Shabazz died in Mexico City on May 9, 2013, at the age of 28. He was said to be touring Mexico to demand rights for Mexican construction workers in the US. His body, which according to prosecutors had been badly beaten with a rod of some kind, was found in the street in Plaza Garibaldi, a busy tourist spot. According to New York magazine, a friend, who was with Shabazz the night of his death, said the beating was related to a dispute over a $1,200 bar tab for drinks and female companionship.

On May 13, David Hernández Cruz and Manuel Alejandro Pérez de Jesús, waiters at a nightclub called The Palace, were arrested in connection with Shabazz's death. By 2015, Hernandez, Pérez de Jesús, and Juan Dircio Guzmán, the head waiter at The Palace, had been sentenced to — and were serving — terms of 27 years and six months for their roles in the murder. However, by January 2020, the three suspects were released by an appeals court for lack of evidence on the original charges.

Approximately 200 people attended his funeral in California. One activist stated that Shabazz had plans to construct mosques and schools throughout America. He was buried in Ferncliff Cemetery in Hartsdale, New York, near the graves of his grandparents, Malcolm X and Betty Shabazz.

== See also ==
- Bibliography of Malcolm X
- Bibliography of Martin Luther King Jr.
