= You'll Rock =

Single by LL Cool J

from the album Radio
- A-side: "I Need a Beat"
- Released: 1985
- Recorded: 1985
- Genre: Hip hop
- Length: 4:32
- Label: Def Jam
- Songwriters: James Todd Smith; Rick Rubin
- Producers: Rick Rubin; LL Cool J

LL Cool J singles chronology
"Rock the Bells" (1985)	"You'll Rock" (1985)	"I'm Bad" (1987)

"You'll Rock" is a single by LL Cool J from his debut album, Radio. It was released in 1985 for Def Jam Recordings and was produced and written by Rick Rubin and LL Cool J. The song would prove to be the least successful of the four singles released from the album, only peaking at #59 on the Hot R&B/Hip-Hop Songs.

== Track listing ==
=== A-side ===
1. "I Need a Beat"- 4:59

=== B-side ===
1. "You'll Rock" (Remix)- 4:32
