= Shabazz =

Shabazz may refer to:

- Tribe of Shabazz, a supposed ancient Black nation led by prophet Shabazz, according to the Nation of Islam doctrine
- Shabazz (name), including a list of notable people with the name
- Shabazz Palaces, hip-hop group
- Shabazz, a 1975 album by jazz drummer Billy Cobham
