= Malcolm X and Dr. Betty Shabazz Memorial and Educational Center =

Memorial in Manhattan, New York

Coordinates: 40°50′21″N 73°56′26″W

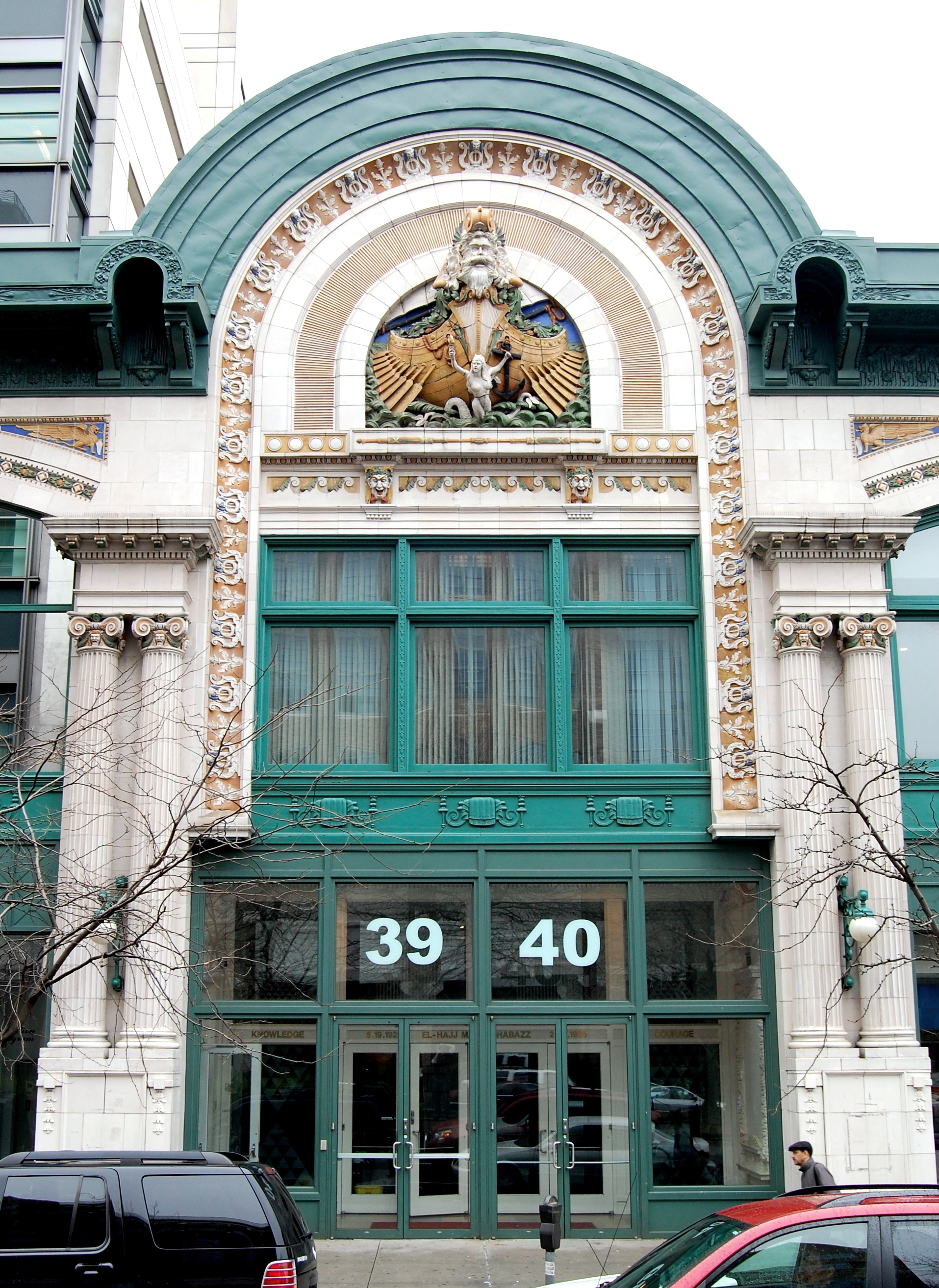
Entrance to the Shabazz Center

The Malcolm X and Dr. Betty Shabazz Memorial and Educational Center, also called the Shabazz Center, is a memorial to Malcolm X and Betty Shabazz located at 3940 Broadway and West 165th Street in the Washington Heights neighborhood of Manhattan, New York City. The building once housed the Audubon Ballroom, where Malcolm X was assassinated on February 21, 1965. It opened on May 19, 2005, the 80th anniversary of Malcolm X's birth.

The center is home to documents related to Malcolm X and Betty Shabazz. The center is decorated with a 63-foot (19-meter) mural depicting the life of Malcolm X and a life-size bronze statue of the human rights activist. It includes six interactive kiosks that provide information about the lives of Malcolm X and Betty Shabazz. The kiosks were developed by Columbia University's Digital Knowledge Ventures and Professor Manning Marable of the university's African American Studies department.

== History ==
The Audubon Ballroom had fallen into disrepair after the 1965 assassination of Malcolm X, and by the mid-1970s it had become the property of New York City. In the early 1980s, Columbia University proposed the construction of a modern biotechnology center on the site, a plan that later grew to include a research park. After community protests and legal attempts by preservationists to save the building, Columbia sought Betty Shabazz's approval for the project. She appealed for the preservation of the ballroom where her husband had been shot, and a compromise was worked out which allowed the building of the biotechnology center, but also preserved and restored the facade of the Audubon Ballroom building, which would be developed into a museum.

After a decade of wrangling between the university, the city, and historic preservation organizations, the Audubon Business and Technology Center was completed. Betty Shabazz oversaw the development of the Malcolm X Educational Foundation, which she hoped would host international conferences and educate the public about human rights. Plans for the site briefly stalled after Shabazz's death in 1997, but the scope of the center was expanded and it eventually was completed although it struggled in its early years.

The daughters of Malcolm and Betty Shabazz continue the family's advocacy work through the museum.

== See also ==
- Bibliography of Malcolm X
- Bibliography of Martin Luther King Jr.
