= Rock the Bells (song) =

Single by LL Cool J

from the album Radio
- B-side: "El Shabazz"
- Released: September 22, 1986
- Genre: Hip hop
- Length: 4:00
- Label: Def Jam; Columbia; CBS
- Songwriters: James Todd Smith; Frederick Rubin
- Producers: Rick Rubin; LL Cool J

LL Cool J singles chronology
"I Can Give You More" (1986)	"Rock the Bells" (1986)	"You'll Rock" (1986)

"Rock the Bells" is the third single from LL Cool J's debut album, Radio. It was released in 1985 for Def Jam Recordings, was written by LL Cool J and produced by Rick Rubin. It was the follow-up to "I Can Give You More". "Rock the Bells" peaked at #17 on the Hot R&B/Hip-Hop Songs. Despite the song's title, no bells can be heard in the album recording. The original version of the song, riddled with bells of various types including a cowbell, is 7 minutes and 11 seconds long and was only released on 12 inch vinyl. It was based on the 1982 song "Breaking Bells" by Crash Crew.

The song was later sampled by LL Cool J himself for his song "Mama Said Knock You Out", from his album of the same name. The intro was famously parodied by English footballer John Barnes for his 1988 single "Anfield Rap". The song also featured in the 2002 video game Mat Hoffman's Pro BMX 2, the 2006 game Scarface: The World is Yours, the 2008 game Skate It and 2009's Skate 2. The song was also used in the video game DJ Hero in which it was mixed with The Verve's "Bitter Sweet Symphony". The song was later featured on LL Cool J's compilation album All World: Greatest Hits. The song was also used on Smith's own channel Rock the Bells Radio (formerly Back Spin) for SiriusXM.

== Track listing ==
7" Version

1. "Rock the Bells" – 4:00
2. "El Shabazz" – 3:24

12"

1. "Rock the Bells" – 4:00
2. "Rock the Bells (Original Version)" – 7:11
