= Attallah Shabazz =

American actress and author (born 1958)

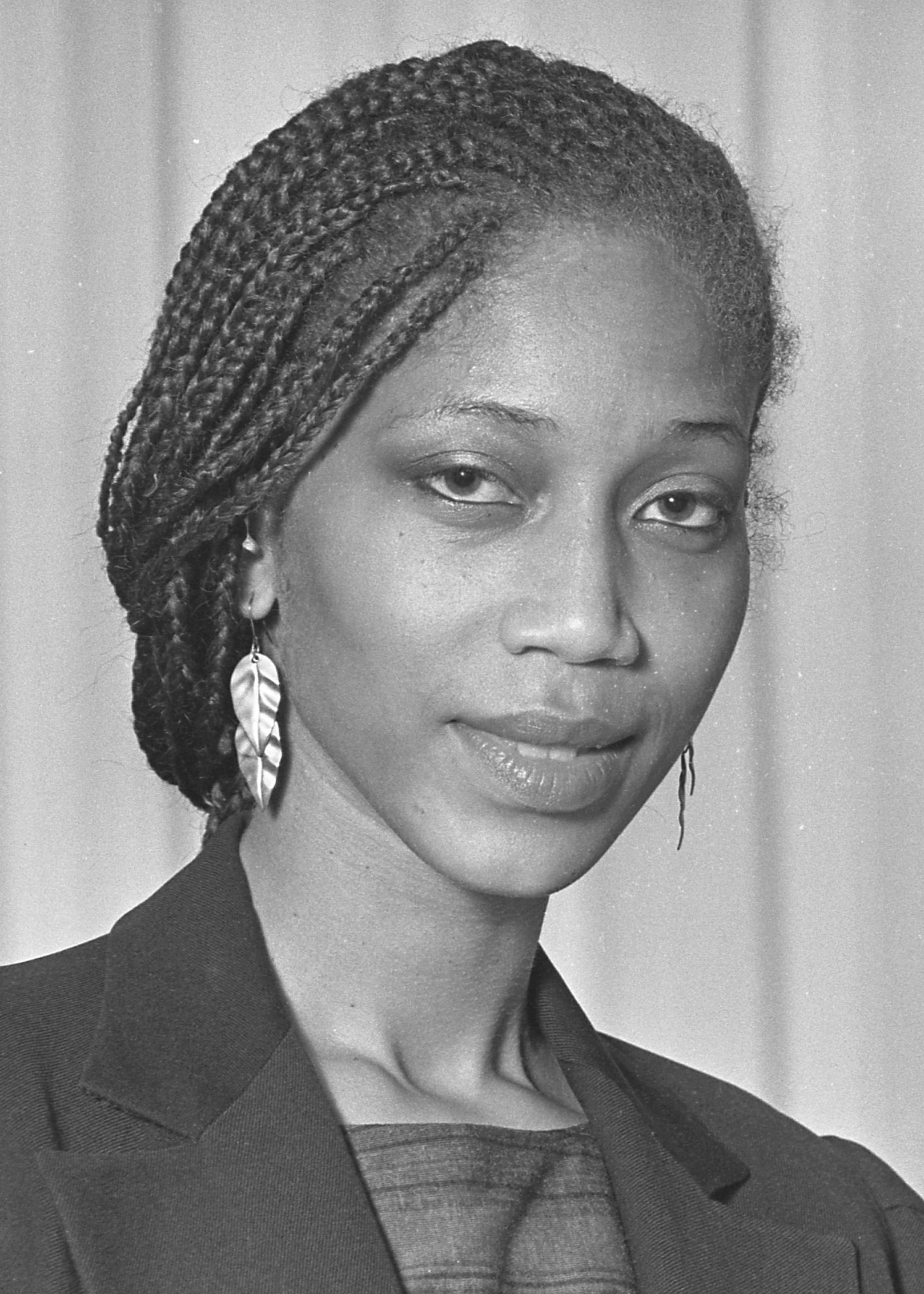
- Shabazz in 1983
- Born: November 16, 1958 (age 67); New York City, U.S.
- Education: Briarcliff College
- Parent(s): Malcolm X Betty Shabazz

Ambassador-at-large of Belize
- Incumbent
- Assumed office 2002
- Prime Minister: Said Musa; Dean Barrow; Johnny Briceño
- Preceded by: Position established

Attallah Shabazz (born November 16, 1958) is an American actress, author, diplomat, and motivational speaker, and the eldest daughter of Malcolm X and Betty Shabazz.

== Early life ==
Shabazz was born in Brooklyn, New York, on November 16, 1958. Shabazz says her name is Arabic for "the gift of God" (Arabic: عَطَاء الله, romanized: `Aṭā'allāh) and she is not named after Attila the Hun as her father's autobiography states.

In February 1965, her sister Qubilah woke the family in the middle of the night with her screams; the house was on fire. Shabazz recalled that night in a 1989 interview: "I almost didn't realize how dangerous it was—my father was that calm, that together a parent. My eyes were burning, I was coughing, but before you knew it, he had us all out of there, and we were safe at a friend's house. My mother's like that too. Together."

A week later, Shabazz was at Manhattan's Audubon Ballroom, with her mother and sisters, when her father was assassinated. She was six at the time and reportedly the only one of his children who has clear memories of him. In 2005, she told journalist Gabe Pressman that she remembered the events of that day "vividly":

It was a Sunday morning and we were at the Wallaces, this is Aunt Ruby's [Ruby Dee's] brother's house, and my father called and said to my mother, "Why don't you come down?," and that was out of sorts, and I knew it, but at the same time excited. And so two of my little sisters—I had three little sisters at that time—but the baby was six months, and my two sisters after me, we all got ready to go down....
My mother was pregnant with my baby sisters, the twins. We thought it was a boy at the time, so we referred to her stomach as Malik, and six months later they were born. But I remember the day, and it changed everything.

Shabazz told People in 1983 that she sometimes had flashbacks. "I would bump into people from the Nation of Islam, and I thought they were going to do the same thing to me."

=== Childhood and education ===
Shabazz had an apolitical upbringing in a racially integrated neighborhood in Mount Vernon, New York. Her family never took part in demonstrations or attended rallies. She received religious education at the Islamic Center at Riverside Drive and 72nd Street in Manhattan. With her sisters, she joined Jack and Jill, a social club for the children of well-off African Americans. As a teenager, she attended the United Nations International School. Although officials at the school prepared for "an onslaught of militancy" when 13-year-old Shabazz enrolled, "instead I walked in wearing my lime-green dress, my opaque stockings, my patent leather shoes, and carrying my little patent leather pocketbook," she recalled in a 1982 interview. After graduating, she studied international law at Briarcliff College, but the school shut down before she graduated.

== Collaboration with Yolanda King ==
In 1979, Moneta Sleet Jr. of Ebony brought Shabazz together with Yolanda King, daughter of Martin Luther King Jr. and Coretta Scott King, for a photo shoot. Before the meeting, both women were worried that the bad feelings between their fathers might spoil the encounter. Instead, they found that they liked one another and had many things in common besides being in their early 20s: they both lived in New York City, they were aspiring actresses, their birthdays were one day apart, and they shared an optimism and interest in activism that one might expect from the eldest children of civil rights martyrs.

Within a few months, King and Shabazz went on a joint lecture tour and co-wrote a play for teenage audiences, Stepping into Tomorrow. The play explored difficult themes about growing up through the story of six friends seeing one another again at a ten-year high school reunion. Responding to critics who found the play too soft, Shabazz said that it was not meant to be a "cerebral piece of writing", but to be "socially uplifting" and "give direction".

Stepping into Tomorrow quickly grew into a collaboration called Nucleus, an eight-member theatre troupe based in New York and Los Angeles that performed in about 50 cities a year. Ebony included Shabazz and King among its "Fifty Young Leaders of the Future" in 1983. In the mid-1980s, Shabazz and King co-wrote another play, Of One Mind, about their fathers and what course history might have taken had they not been killed. Their collaboration lasted about twelve years.

In December 1990, shortly after celebrating the tenth anniversary of Stepping into Tomorrow, King and Shabazz found themselves at the center of a controversy concerning a long-scheduled performance of the play in Arizona. In November, voters in that state had defeated two competing ballot measures that would have established a paid holiday for state employees on Martin Luther King Jr. Day. (The day was an unpaid holiday.) Civil rights groups called for a boycott of the state as a result of the vote. Days after the two women announced they would proceed with their performance, King cancelled her appearance, saying an understudy would take her place. Shabazz performed as scheduled.

== Since Nucleus ==
In February 1992, Shabazz spoke at the funeral of her godfather, Alex Haley. Before his death, he had asked her to write a foreword to The Autobiography of Malcolm X, which her father had written with him. The new edition of the book, featuring Shabazz's foreword, was published in 1999. Black Issues Book Review called the foreword "superbly realized".

Shabazz signed a contract in 1994 to write her memoirs. The book's publication was postponed several times. A 1997 review of the book, From Mine Eyes, called it the "powerful and uplifting story of a young girl who came of age during the height of the civil rights movement and is now able to share, in vivid detail, the most tragic events of her life".

At her mother's funeral service in June 1997, Shabazz eulogized her on behalf of the family. Standing in the small pulpit of New York's Riverside Church with her five sisters, she recalled the loving relationship her parents had shared and imagined her father stretching his arm to her mother, inviting her to join him. Then Shabazz asked everybody in attendance to "look to the person to the left and to the right of you and genuinely say, 'I wish you the best.'"

In May 2000, Mike Wallace brought together Shabazz and Louis Farrakhan for a joint interview on 60 Minutes. Farrakhan, then known as Louis X, had been a protégé of her father's in the Nation of Islam. After Malcolm X left the Nation, Louis X turned on his mentor and became one of his sharpest critics, writing in Muhammad Speaks (the Nation's organ) that "such a man as Malcolm is worthy of death." The Shabazz family are among those who have accused Louis Farrakhan of involvement in Malcolm X's assassination. During the interview, Farrakhan said he "truly loved" Malcolm X. He said: "I may have been complicit in words that I spoke leading up to" the assassination; "I acknowledge that and regret that any word that I have said caused the loss of life of a human being." Farrakhan also said that the U.S. government was involved in the assassination; "This is bigger than the Nation of Islam." Shabazz replied: "You can't keep pointing fingers. My father was not killed from a grassy knoll." After the interview, she issued a statement thanking Farrakhan for "acknowledging his culpability" and wishing him peace.

In 2002, Prime Minister Said Musa of Belize asked Shabazz to serve as Ambassador-at-large to represent Belize internationally in perpetuity.

When actor and activist Ossie Davis died in February 2005, Shabazz spoke at his funeral. She recalled the first sentence of the eulogy Davis had delivered at her father's funeral forty years earlier, "Harlem has come to bid farewell to one of its finest hopes", and added, "Ditto". She also thanked her "Auntie Ruby" and "Uncle Ossie" for their love and support, especially at times when her family had been shunned by others.

Shabazz spoke at the funeral of Coretta Scott King in February 2006. She told of the special bond her mother had shared with King and Myrlie Evers-Williams, the widow of Medgar Evers, and the closeness she felt with the King family, especially Yolanda. Shabazz also told how she and Coretta Scott King had kept up regular phone calls after her mother's death, and how King sent a card and a gift to her and her sisters on each of their birthdays, even after she had suffered a stroke.

In June 2016, Shabazz spoke at the funeral of boxer and activist Muhammad Ali. Ali, then known as Cassius Clay, had been inspired by her father to join the Nation of Islam and the two men became very close—Clay paid for Malcolm X to bring his family to Miami Beach for his 1964 championship fight against Sonny Liston, which Malcolm X watched from a ringside seat—but Clay severed all ties with him when Malcolm X left the Nation. Ali later left the Nation himself and, like Malcolm X, became a Sunni Muslim; many years later, he wrote: "Turning my back on Malcolm was one of the mistakes that I regret most in my life." Ali reconciled with Shabazz during production of the 2001 film Ali, on which she served as a consultant. At his funeral, Shabazz said that having Ali in her life "somehow sustained my dad's breath for me just a little while longer—51 years longer—until now."

== Personal life ==
Shabazz guards her privacy. In interviews, she generally declines to answer questions about her age, where she lives, and her marital or family status. Shabazz became an honorary member with five others of Delta Sigma Theta sorority on November 20, 2021, at the 55th National Convention in Atlanta, Georgia.

== Bibliography ==
- ——— (1999). From Mine Eyes: Malcolm X's Eldest Daughter Shares Her Life. New York: William Morrow. ISBN 978-0-688-15188-1.
- ——— (1999). "Foreword". In Malcolm X; with the assistance of Alex Haley (eds.). The Autobiography of Malcolm X. New York: Ballantine Books. ISBN 978-0-345-35068-8.

== See also ==
- Bibliography of Malcolm X
- Bibliography of Martin Luther King Jr.
