= Audubon Ballroom =

Former theater and ballroom in Manhattan, New York

Coordinates: 40°50′21″N 73°56′26″W

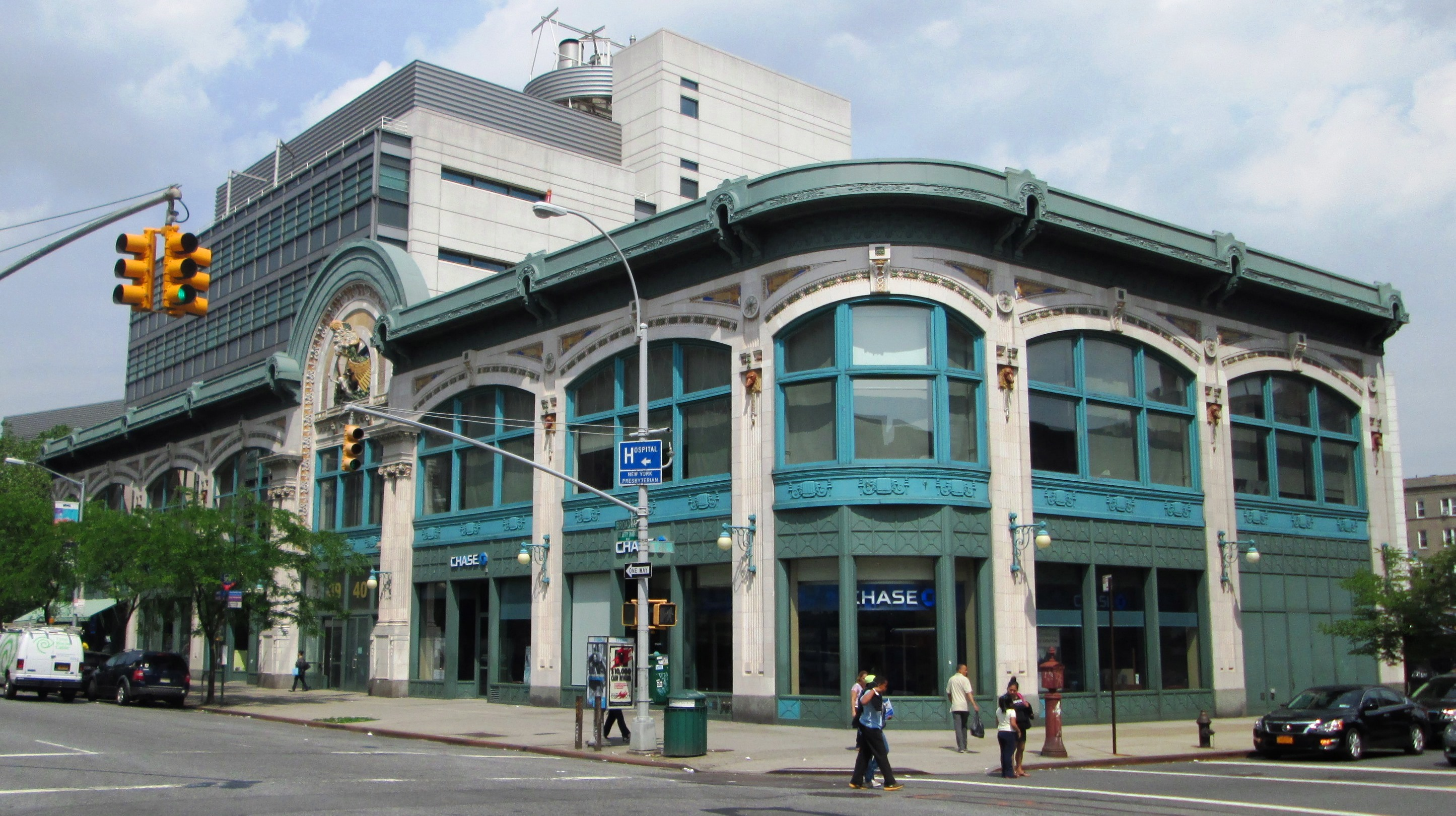
The former Audubon Ballroom: In the foreground is the Shabazz Center, in the background, rising above the original building, is Columbia University Medical Center's Mary Woodard Lasker Biomedical Research Building, the location of the Audubon Business and Technology Center.

The Audubon Theatre and Ballroom (generally referred to as the Audubon Ballroom) was a theatre and ballroom located at 3940 Broadway, at the intersection with West 165th Street, in the Washington Heights neighborhood of Manhattan, New York City. It was built in 1912 and was designed by Thomas W. Lamb. The theatre was known at various times as the William Fox Audubon Theatre, the Beverly Hills Theater, and the San Juan Theater. The ballroom is noted for being the site of the assassination of Malcolm X on February 21, 1965. Most of the building was demolished starting in 1992, with two-thirds of the facade preserved. Since 2005, it has been the Audubon Business and Technology Center, which is part of Columbia University's Audubon Research Park.

== History ==
The Audubon Ballroom was built in 1912 by film producer William Fox, who later founded the Fox Film Corporation. Fox hired Thomas W. Lamb, one of the foremost American theater architects, to design the building. The building contained a theatre with 2500 seats, and a second-floor ballroom that could accommodate 200 seated guests. During its history, the Audubon Ballroom was used as a vaudeville house, a movie theater, and a meeting hall where political activists often met.

In the 1930s, Congregation Emes Wozedek, a synagogue whose members were predominantly immigrants from Germany, began to use basement rooms of the Audubon Ballroom to conduct its religious services. At around the same time, several trade unions, including the Municipal Transit Workers, the IRT Brotherhood Union, and the Transport Workers' Union, utilized the meeting rooms. In 1950, the congregants purchased the building, and they continued to hold services there until 1983.

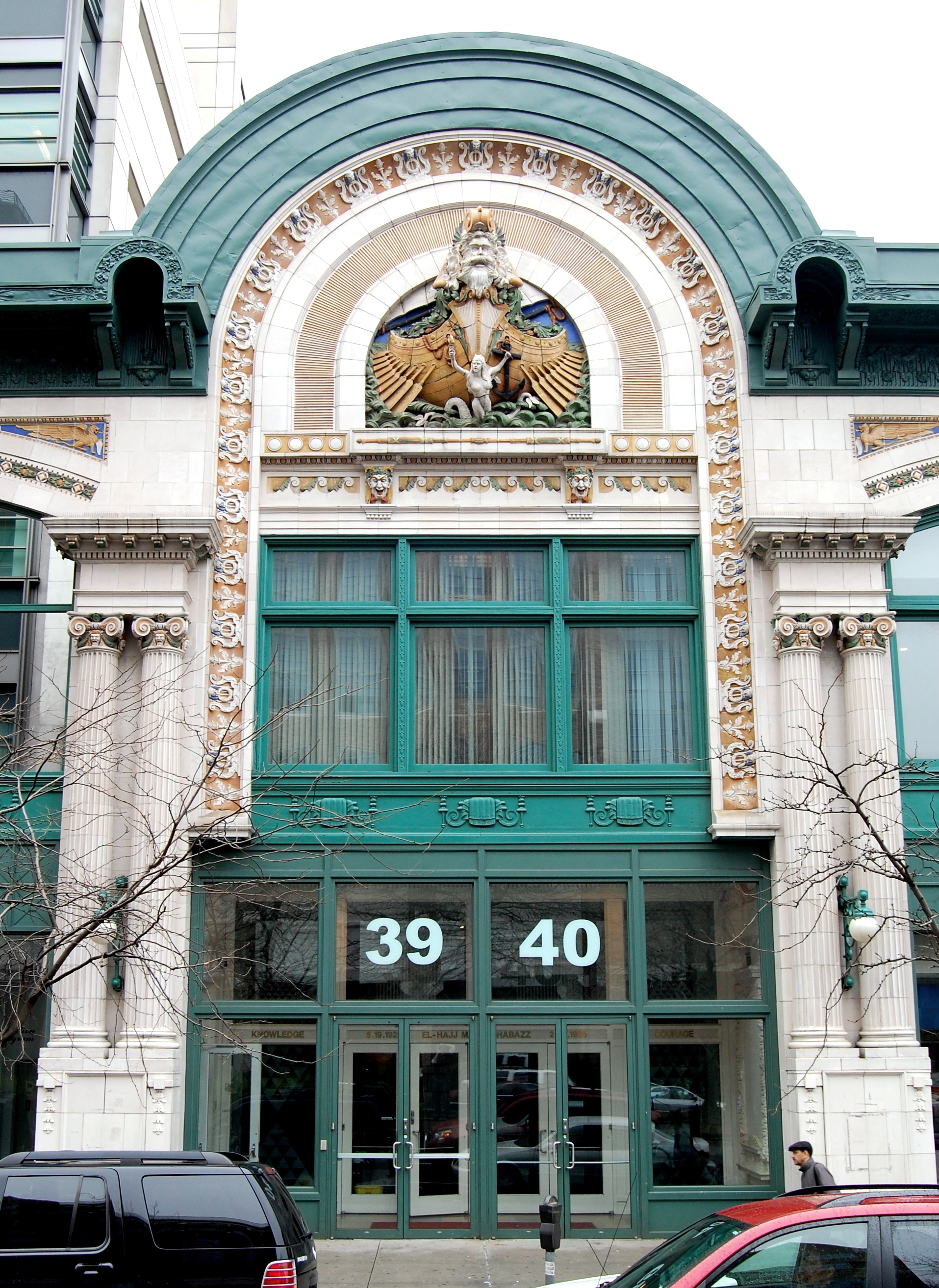
Entrance to the Shabazz Center

Among the many events held at the Ballroom was the annual New York Mardi Gras Festival.

After Malcolm X left the Nation of Islam in 1964, he founded the Organization of Afro-American Unity (OAAU), whose weekly meetings were held at the Audubon Ballroom. It was at one of those meetings, on February 21, 1965, that Malcolm X was assassinated as he was giving a speech.

Because of non-payment of property taxes, New York City took possession of the theatre in 1967. Nevertheless, in the 1960s and 1970s, the Ballroom operated as the San Juan Theater, showing films which catered to the increasingly Hispanic neighborhood. It closed in 1980, and the building remained vacant and the exterior deteriorated.

=== Adaptive reuse ===
In 1989, Columbia University, with the Port Authority of New York and New Jersey as a partner, reached an agreement with the city, and in 1992 it began the process of demolishing the Audubon Ballroom to replace it with a medical research facility. Although many city officials, including Mayor David Dinkins, were strongly in favor of the project because of the jobs and economic impetus it would bring to the area, which had suffered greatly in the economic downturn of the 1970s, community activists and Columbia University students – who occupied Hamilton Hall on campus – protested the planned demolition, and historic preservation groups unsuccessfully sued to prevent it. They were also unable to persuade the New York City Landmarks Preservation Commission to hold a hearing on giving the building landmark status.

Eventually a compromise was reached, at least in part due to pressure brought by Manhattan Borough President Ruth Messinger and Malcolm X's widow, Betty Shabazz, who both favored adaptive reuse of the building. They were supported by a report on its structural integrity produced by a pro bono team of architects assembled by the New York Landmarks Conservancy and the Municipal Art Society. The compromise allowed Columbia to build on the northern part of the building their research facility – now the Audubon Business and Technology Center in the Mary Woodard Lasker Biomedical Research Building, part of the Audubon Biomedical Science and Technology Park a public-private partnership between Columbia University Medical Center and the New York state and city governments. In return, two-thirds of the Audubon Ballroom's original facade – the part along Broadway and West 165th Street – would be preserved and restored. In addition, a portion of the interior ballroom where Malcolm X was killed was restored and protected, to be made into a museum honoring him.

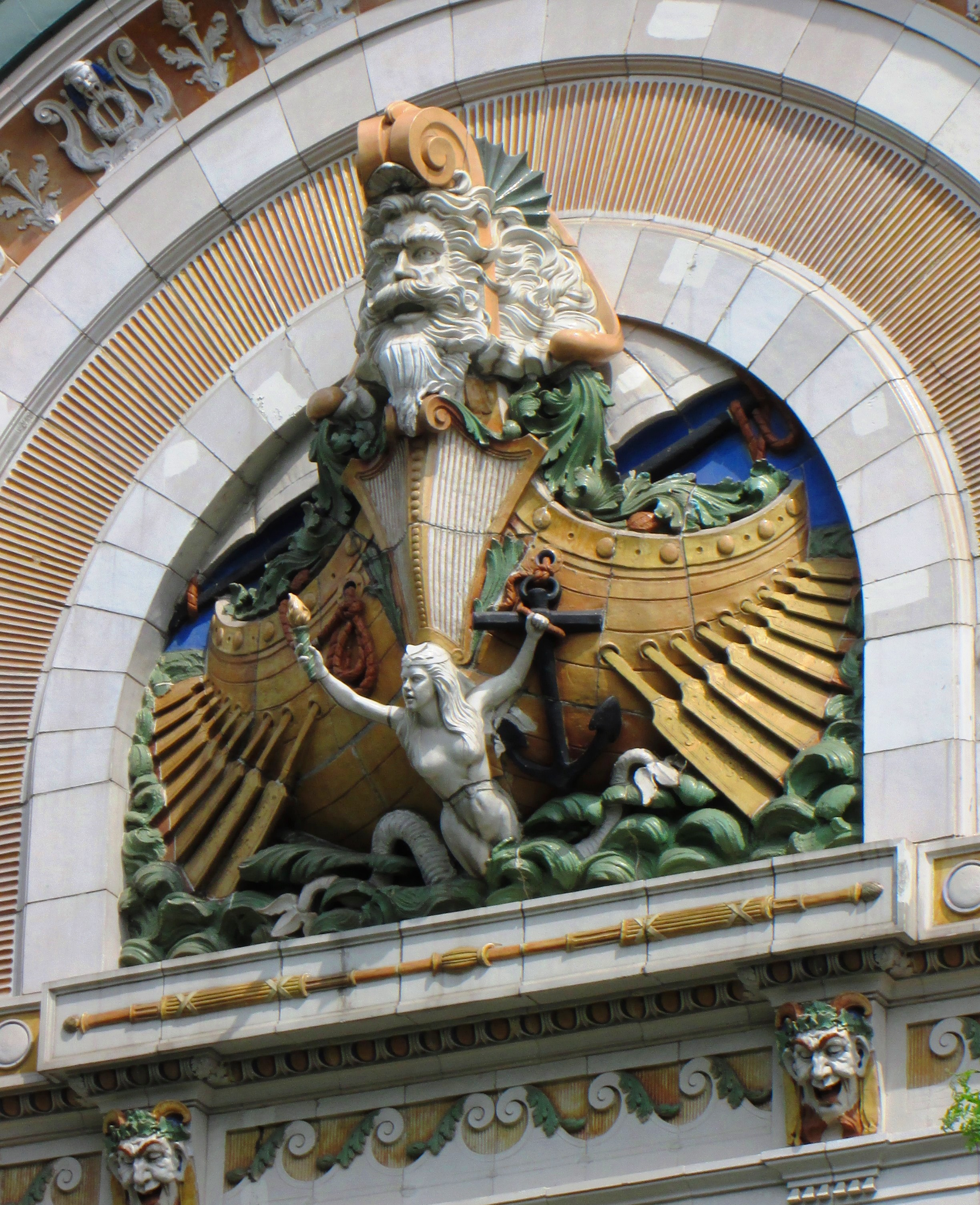
The statue of Neptune on a ship above the entrance

In 2005, the Malcolm X and Dr. Betty Shabazz Memorial and Educational Center opened in the lobby to commemorate the contributions Malcolm X made to the civil rights movement.

== Architecture ==
Architect Thomas Lamb, who later would design the nearby eclectic United Palace, was an advocate of the use of ornamentation and color on his building's exteriors. He would write: "Exotic ornaments, colors and scenes are particularly effective in creating an atmosphere in which the mind is free to frolic and becomes receptive to entertainment." In line with this philosophy, the facade of the Audubon Ballroom presents terra-cotta glazed polychromy, encrustations and cornices. Its ornamentations include brown foxes between the windows on the second floor, intended to flatter Fox, and, most prominently, a colorful protruding three-dimensional statue of Neptune on a ship.

Alterations to the building in 1996 were made by the architecture firm of Davis Brody Bond, who also designed Columbia University's new building, while the restoration of the facade was handled by preservation specialist Jan Hird Pokorny.
