= Betty Shabazz =

American educator and wife of Malcolm X (1935–1997)

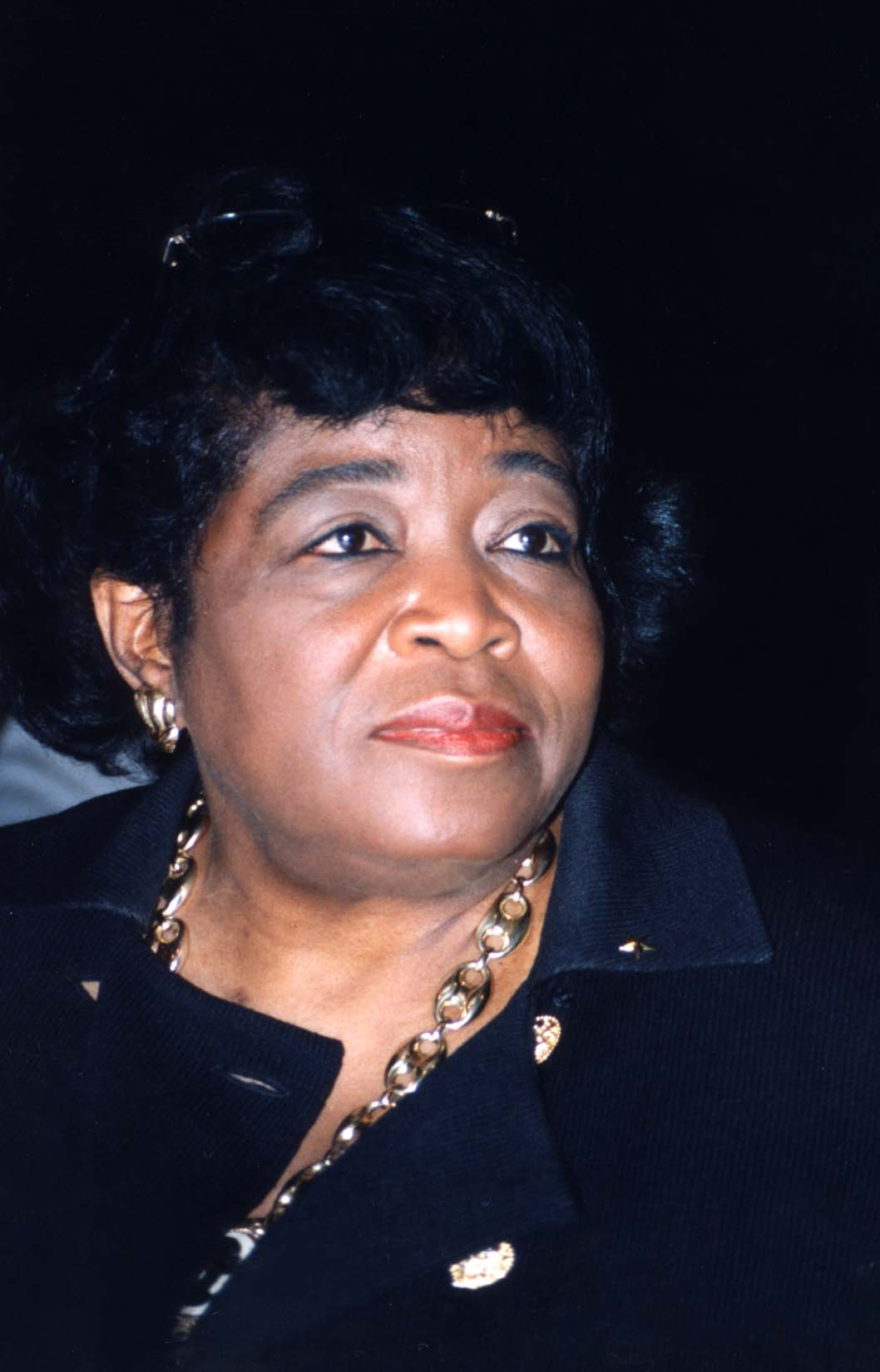
- Shabazz in 1996
- Born: Betty Dean Sanders; May 28, 1935 (Note: Rickford, pg. 2. Some sources indicate May 28, 1936. According to Perry, 1934 is the year shown on Shabazz's driver's license application and nursing license, but 1936 is shown on her marriage license and voting registration application (pg. 440). According to Rickford, Shabazz's birth certificate has not been located (pp. 2–3).); Pinehurst, Georgia, U.S.
- Died: June 23, 1997 (aged 62); New York City, U.S.
- Resting place: Ferncliff Cemetery
- Other name: Betty X
- Education: Tuskegee University; Brooklyn State College School of Nursing; University of Massachusetts Amherst
- Spouse: Malcolm X (m. 1958; died 1965)
- Children: 6, including Attallah, Qubilah, and Ilyasah
- Relatives: Malcolm Shabazz (grandson)

Betty Shabazz (born Betty Dean Sanders; May 28, 1935 – June 23, 1997), also known as Betty X, was an American educator and civil rights advocate who was married to Malcolm X.

Shabazz grew up in Detroit, Michigan, where her foster parents largely sheltered her from racism. She attended the Tuskegee Institute in Alabama, where she had her first encounters with racism. Unhappy with the situation in Alabama, she moved to New York City, where she became a nurse. It was there that she met Malcolm X and, in 1956, joined the Nation of Islam. The couple married in 1958.

Along with her husband, Shabazz left the Nation of Islam in 1964. She witnessed his assassination the following year. Left with the responsibility of raising six daughters as a widow, Shabazz pursued higher education, and went to work at Medgar Evers College in Brooklyn, New York.

Following the 1995 arrest of her daughter, Qubilah, for allegedly conspiring to murder Louis Farrakhan, Shabazz took in her ten-year-old grandson Malcolm. In 1997, he set fire to her apartment. Shabazz suffered severe burns and died three weeks later as a result of her injuries.

== Early life ==
Betty Dean Sanders was born on May 28, 1935, to Ollie Mae Sanders and Shelman Sandlin. Sandlin was 21 years old and Ollie Mae Sanders was a teenager; the couple were unmarried. Throughout her life, Betty Sanders maintained that she had been born in Detroit but early records — such as her high-school and college transcripts — show Pinehurst, Georgia, as her place of birth. Authorities in Georgia and Michigan have been unable to locate her birth certificate.

By most accounts, Ollie Mae Sanders abused her daughter, whom she was raising in Detroit. When Betty was about 11 years old, she was taken in by Lorenzo and Helen Malloy, a prominent businessman and his wife. Helen Malloy was a founding member of the Housewives' League of Detroit, a group of African-American women who organized campaigns to support black-owned businesses and boycott stores that refused to hire black employees. She was also a member of the National Council of Negro Women and the NAACP. The Malloys were both active members of their local Bethel African Methodist Episcopal Church.

Despite their lessons on black self-reliance, the Malloys never spoke with Sanders about racism. Looking back in 1995, Shabazz wrote: "Race relations were not discussed and it was hoped that by denying the existence of race problems, the problems would go away. Anyone who openly discussed race relations was quickly viewed as a 'troublemaker.'" Still, two race riots during her childhood—in 1942 when the Sojourner Truth housing project was desegregated, and one the following year on Belle Isle—made up what Shabazz later called the "psychological background for my formative years".

== Young adult years ==
After she graduated from high school, Sanders left her foster parents' home in Detroit to study at the Tuskegee Institute (now Tuskegee University), a historically black college in Alabama that was Lorenzo Malloy's alma mater. She intended to earn a degree in education and become a teacher. When she left Detroit to go to Alabama, her foster mother stood at the train station crying. Shabazz later recalled that Malloy was trying to mumble something, but the words would not come out. By the time she arrived in Alabama, she felt she knew what her foster mother was saying. "The minute I got off that train, I knew what she was trying to say. She was trying to tell me in ten words or less about racism."

Nothing had prepared Sanders for Southern racism. So long as she stayed on campus, she could avoid interacting with white people, but weekend trips into Montgomery, the nearest city, would try her patience. Black students had to wait until every white person in a store had been helped before the staff would serve them — if they received any service at all. When she complained to the Malloys, they refused to discuss the issue; in a 1989 interview, Shabazz summarized their attitude as "if you're just quiet it will go away."

Sanders' studies suffered as a result of her growing frustration. She decided to change her field of study from education to nursing. The dean of nursing, Lillian Holland Harvey, encouraged Sanders to consider studying in a Tuskegee-affiliated program at the Brooklyn State College School of Nursing in New York City. Against her foster parents' wishes, Sanders left Alabama for New York in 1953.

In New York, Sanders encountered a different form of racism. At Montefiore Hospital, where she performed her clinical training, black nurses were given worse assignments than white nurses. White patients sometimes were abusive toward black nurses. While the racial climate in New York was better than the situation in Alabama, Sanders frequently wondered whether she had merely exchanged Jim Crow racism for a more genteel prejudice.

=== Nation of Islam ===
During her second year of nursing school, Sanders was invited by an older nurse's aide to a Friday night dinner party at the Nation of Islam temple in Harlem. "The food was delicious", Shabazz recalled in 1992, "I'd never tasted food like that." After dinner, the woman asked Sanders to come to the Muslims' lecture. Sanders agreed. After the speech, the nurse's aide invited Sanders to join the Nation of Islam; Sanders politely declined. When the woman asked her why she chose not to join the Nation of Islam after visiting, Sanders replied that she did not know she had been brought there to join. "Besides, my mother would kill me, and additionally I don't even understand the philosophy." The Malloys were Methodists, and when she was 13, Sanders had decided she would remain a Methodist for the rest of her life.

The nurse's aide told Sanders about her minister, who was not at the temple that night: "Just wait until you hear my minister talk. He's very disciplined, he's good looking, and all the sisters want him." Sanders enjoyed the food so much, she agreed to come back and meet the woman's minister. At the second dinner, the nurse's aide told her the minister was present and Sanders thought to herself, "Big deal."

In 1992, she recalled how her demeanor changed when she caught a glimpse of Malcolm X:

Then, I looked over and saw this man on the extreme right aisle sort of galloping to the podium. He was tall, he was thin, and the way he was galloping it looked as though he was going someplace much more important than the podium. ... He got to the podium—and I sat up straight. I was impressed with him.

Sanders met Malcolm X again at a dinner party. The two had a long conversation about Sanders's life: her childhood in Detroit, the racial hostility she had encountered in Alabama, and her studies in New York. He spoke to her about the condition of African Americans and the causes of racism. Sanders began to see things from a different perspective. "I really had a lot of pent-up anxiety about my experience in the South," Shabazz recalled in a 1990 interview, "and Malcolm reassured me that it was understandable how I felt."

Soon Sanders was attending all of Malcolm X's lectures at Temple Number Seven in Harlem. He always sought her out afterwards, and he would ask her a lot of questions. Sanders was impressed with Malcolm X's leadership and work ethic. She felt he was selfless when it came to helping others, but he had no one to lean on when he needed help. She thought maybe she could be that person. He also began to pressure her to join the Nation of Islam. In mid-1956, Sanders converted. Like many members of the Nation of Islam, she changed her surname to "X", which represented the family name of her African ancestors whom she could never have known.

== Marriage and family ==
Betty X and Malcolm X did not have a conventional courtship. One-on-one dates were contrary to the teachings of the Nation of Islam. Instead, the couple shared their "dates" with dozens of other members. Malcolm X frequently took groups to visit New York's museums and libraries, and he always invited Betty X.

Although they had never discussed the subject, Betty X suspected that Malcolm X was interested in marriage. One day he called and asked her to marry him, and they were married on January 14, 1958, in Lansing, Michigan. By coincidence, Betty X became a licensed practical nurse (LPN) on the same day.

At first, their relationship followed the Nation of Islam's strictures concerning marriage; Malcolm X set the rules and Betty X obediently followed them. In 1969, Shabazz wrote that "his indoctrination was so thorough, even to me, that it has become a pattern for our [family's] lives." Over time, the family dynamic changed, as Malcolm X made small concessions to Betty X's demands for more independence. In 1969, Shabazz recalled:

We would have little family talks. They began at first with Malcolm telling me what he expected of a wife. But the first time I told him what I expected of him as a husband it came as a shock. After dinner one night he said, "Boy, Betty, something you said hit me like a ton of bricks. Here I've been going along having our little workshops with me doing all the talking and you doing all the listening." He concluded our marriage should be a mutual exchange.

The couple had six daughters. Their names were Attallah, born in 1958, Arabic for "the gift of God"; Qubilah, born in 1960 and named after Kublai Khan; Ilyasah, born in 1962 and named after Elijah Muhammad; Gamilah Lumumba, born in 1964 and named after Gamal Abdel Nasser (Gamilah being the feminine version of Gamal) and Patrice Lumumba; and twins, Malikah and Malaak, born in 1965 after their father's assassination and named for him. She had 6 grandchildren and 2 great-grandchildren.

=== Leaving the Nation of Islam ===
On March 8, 1964, Malcolm X announced that he was leaving the Nation of Islam. He and Betty X, now known as Betty Shabazz, became Sunni Muslims.

=== Assassination of Malcolm X ===
Betty Shabazz in February 1965, after identifying Malcolm X's body at the New York City Morgue

On February 21, 1965, in Manhattan's Audubon Ballroom, Malcolm X began to speak to a meeting of the Organization of Afro-American Unity when a disturbance broke out in the crowd of 400. As Malcolm X and his bodyguards moved to quiet the disturbance, a man rushed forward and shot Malcolm in the chest with a sawed-off shotgun. Two other men charged the stage and fired handguns, hitting Malcolm X 16 times.

Shabazz was in the audience near the stage with her daughters. When she heard the gunfire, she grabbed the children and pushed them to the floor beneath the bench, where she shielded them with her body. When the shooting stopped, Shabazz ran toward her husband and tried to perform CPR. Police officers and Malcolm X's associates used a stretcher to carry him up the block to Columbia Presbyterian Hospital, where he was pronounced dead.

Angry onlookers caught and beat one of the assassins, who was arrested on the scene. Eyewitnesses identified two more suspects. All three men, who were members of the Nation of Islam, were convicted and sentenced to life in prison.

== After Malcolm's assassination ==
=== Immediately afterward ===
Shabazz had difficulty sleeping for weeks after Malcolm X's assassination. She suffered from nightmares and worried how she would support her family. The publication of The Autobiography of Malcolm X helped, because Shabazz received half of the royalties. (Alex Haley, who assisted Malcolm X in writing the book, got the other half. After the publication of his best-seller Roots, Haley signed over his portion of the royalties to Shabazz.)

Actor and activist Ruby Dee and Juanita Poitier (married to Sidney Poitier until 1965) established the Committee of Concerned Mothers to raise funds to buy a house and pay educational expenses for the Shabazz family. The Committee held a series of benefit concerts at which they raised $17,000. They bought a large two-family home in Mount Vernon, New York, from Congress member Bella Abzug.

Looking back, Shabazz said she initially made an "unrealistic decision" to isolate herself because of the injustice of her husband's assassination. She realized, however, that giving up because of her husband's death would not help the world. "It is impossible to create an environment for children to grow in and develop in isolation. It is imperative that one mix in society on some level and at some time."

=== Pilgrimage to Mecca ===
In late March 1965, Shabazz made the pilgrimage to Mecca (Hajj), as her husband had the year before. Recalling the experience in 1992, Shabazz wrote:

I really don't know where I'd be today if I had not gone to Mecca to make Hajj shortly after Malcolm was assassinated. ... That is what helped put me back on track. ... Going to Mecca, making Hajj, was very good for me because it made me think of all the people in the world who loved me and were for me, who prayed that I would get my life back together. I stopped focusing on the people who were trying to tear me and my family apart.

Shabazz returned from Mecca with a new name that a fellow pilgrim had bestowed upon her, Bahiyah (meaning "beautiful and radiant").

=== Raising her family ===
To provide for her family, she depended on her share of the royalties from The Autobiography of Malcolm X, which was equivalent to an annual salary. In 1966, she sold the movie rights to the Autobiography to film-maker Marvin Worth. She began to authorize the publication of Malcolm X's speeches, which provided another source of income.

When her daughters were enrolled in day care, Shabazz became an active member of the day care center's parents organization, where she became very fond of the organization and where she would later start a campaign to run the organization. In time, she became the parents' representative on the school board. Several years later, she became president of the Westchester Day Care Council.

Shabazz began to accept speaking engagements at colleges and universities. She often spoke about the black nationalist philosophy of Malcolm X, but she also spoke about her role as a wife and mother. Shabazz felt that some of the images of her husband projected by the media were misrepresentations. "They attempted to promote him as a violent person, a hater of whites," she explained. "He was a sensitive man, a very understanding person and yes, he disliked the behavior of some whites ... He had a reality-based agenda."

As her daughters grew older, Shabazz sent them to private schools and summer camps. They joined Jack and Jill, a social club for the children of well-off African Americans.

=== Advanced education ===
In late 1969, Shabazz enrolled at Jersey City State College (now Kean Jersey City) to complete the degree in education she left behind when she became a nurse. She completed her undergraduate studies in one year, and decided to earn a master's degree in health administration. In 1972, Shabazz enrolled at the University of Massachusetts Amherst to pursue an Ed.D. in higher education administration and curriculum development. For the next three years, she drove from Mount Vernon to Amherst, Massachusetts, every Monday morning, and returned home Wednesday night. In July 1975, she defended her dissertation and earned her doctorate.

Shabazz joined the New York Alumnae chapter of Delta Sigma Theta in April 1974.

=== Medgar Evers College ===
In January 1976, Shabazz became associate professor of health sciences with a concentration in nursing at New York's Medgar Evers College. The student body at Medgar Evers was 90 percent black and predominantly working-class, with an average age of 26. Black women made up most of the faculty, and 75 percent of the students were female, two-thirds of them mothers. These were all qualities that made Medgar Evers College attractive to Shabazz.

By 1980, Shabazz was overseeing the health sciences department, and the college president decided she could be more effective in a purely administrative position than she was in the classroom. She was promoted to Director of Institutional Advancement. In her new position, she became a booster and fund-raiser for the college. A year later, she was given tenure. In 1984, Shabazz was given a new title, Director of Institutional Advancement and Public Affairs; she held that position at the college until her death.

=== Volunteer work ===
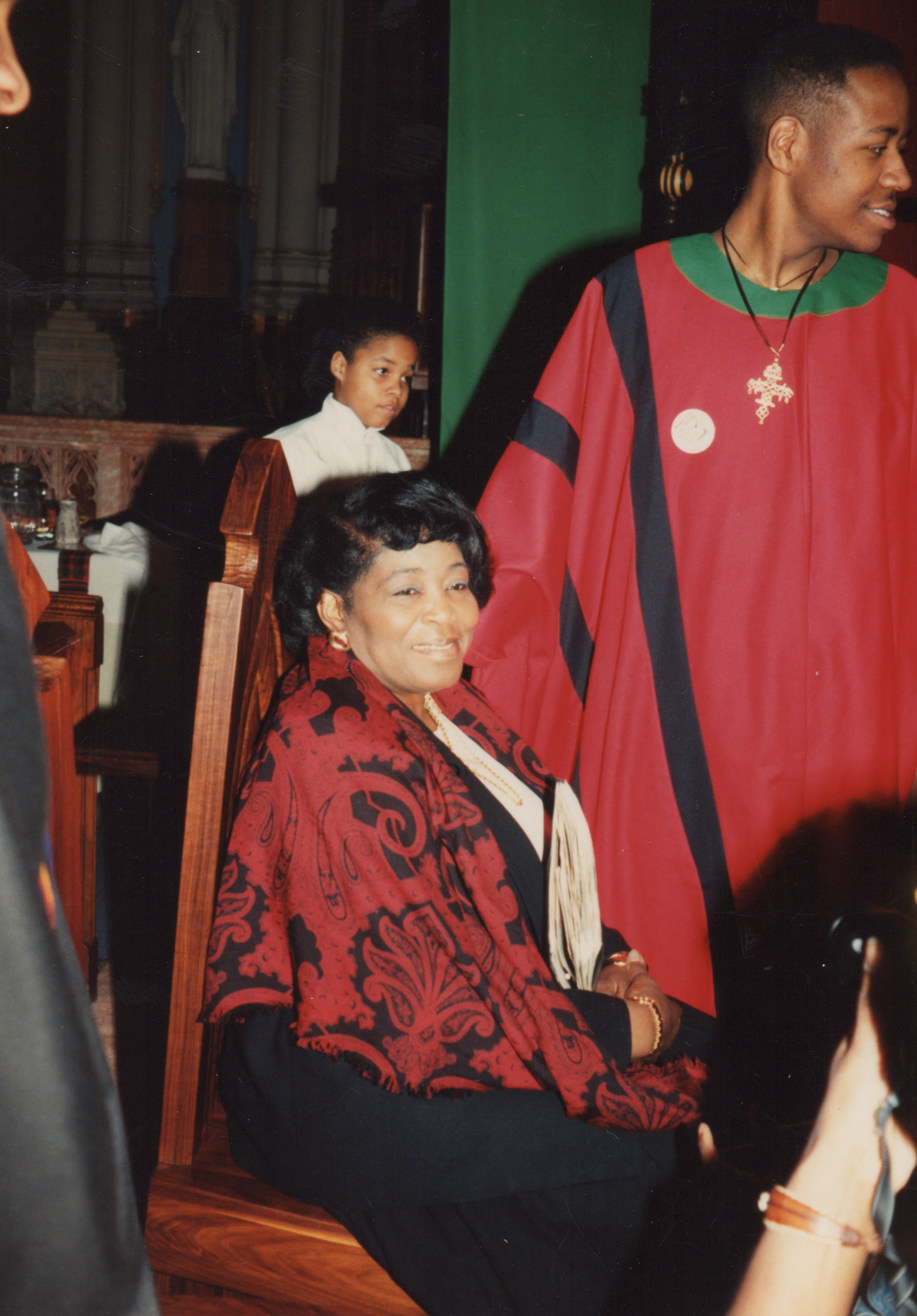
Shabazz at St. Sabina Catholic Church in Chicago

During the 1970s and 1980s, Shabazz continued her volunteer activities. In 1975, President Ford invited her to serve on the American Revolution Bicentennial Council. Shabazz served on an advisory committee on family planning for the U.S. Department of Health and Human Services. In 1984, she hosted the New York convention of the National Council of Negro Women. Shabazz became active in the NAACP and the National Urban League and was a member of The Links. When Nelson and Winnie Mandela visited Harlem during 1990, Shabazz was asked to introduce Winnie Mandela.

Shabazz befriended Myrlie Evers-Williams, the widow of Medgar Evers, and Coretta Scott King, the widow of Martin Luther King Jr. They had the common experience of losing their activist husbands at a young age and raising their children as single mothers. The press came to refer to the three, who made numerous joint public appearances, as the "Movement widows". Evers-Williams and King were frequent guests at Medgar Evers College, and Shabazz occasionally visited the King Center in Atlanta. Writing about Shabazz, Evers-Williams described her as a "free spirit, in the best sense of the word. When she laughed, she had this beauty; when she smiled, it lit up the whole room."

== Louis Farrakhan ==
For many years, Shabazz harbored resentment toward the Nation of Islam—and Louis Farrakhan in particular—for what she felt was their role in the assassination of her husband. Farrakhan seemed to boast of the assassination in a 1993 speech:

Was Malcolm your traitor or ours? And if we dealt with him like a nation deals with a traitor, what the hell business is it of yours? A nation has to be able to deal with traitors and cutthroats and turncoats.

In a 1994 interview, Gabe Pressman asked Shabazz whether Farrakhan "had anything to do" with Malcolm X's death. She replied: "Of course, yes. Nobody kept it a secret. It was a badge of honor. Everybody talked about it, yes." Farrakhan denied the allegations, stating "I never had anything to do with Malcolm's death", although he said he had "created an atmosphere that allowed Malcolm to be assassinated."

In January 1995, Qubilah Shabazz was charged with trying to hire a hit man to kill Farrakhan in retaliation for the murder of her father. Farrakhan surprised the Shabazz family when he defended Qubilah, saying he did not think she was guilty and that he hoped she would not be convicted. That May, Betty Shabazz and Farrakhan shook hands on the stage of the Apollo Theater during a public event intended to raise money for Qubilah's legal defense. Some heralded the evening as a reconciliation between the two, but others thought Shabazz was doing whatever she had to in order to protect her daughter. Regardless, nearly $250,000 was raised that evening. In the aftermath, Shabazz maintained a cool relationship with Farrakhan, although she agreed to speak at his Million Man March that October.

Qubilah accepted a plea agreement with respect to the charges, in which she maintained her innocence but accepted responsibility for her actions. Under the terms of the agreement, she was required to undergo psychological counseling and treatment for drug and alcohol abuse for a two-year period in order to avoid a prison sentence. For the duration of her treatment, Qubilah's ten-year-old son, Malcolm, was sent to live with Shabazz at her apartment in Yonkers, New York.

== Death ==
On June 1, 1997, her 12-year-old grandson Malcolm set a fire in Shabazz's apartment. Shabazz suffered burns over 80 percent of her body, and remained in intensive care for three weeks, at Jacobi Medical Center in the Bronx, New York. She underwent five skin-replacement operations as doctors struggled to replace damaged skin and save her life. Shabazz died of her injuries on June 23, 1997. Malcolm Shabazz was sentenced to 18 months in juvenile detention for manslaughter and arson.

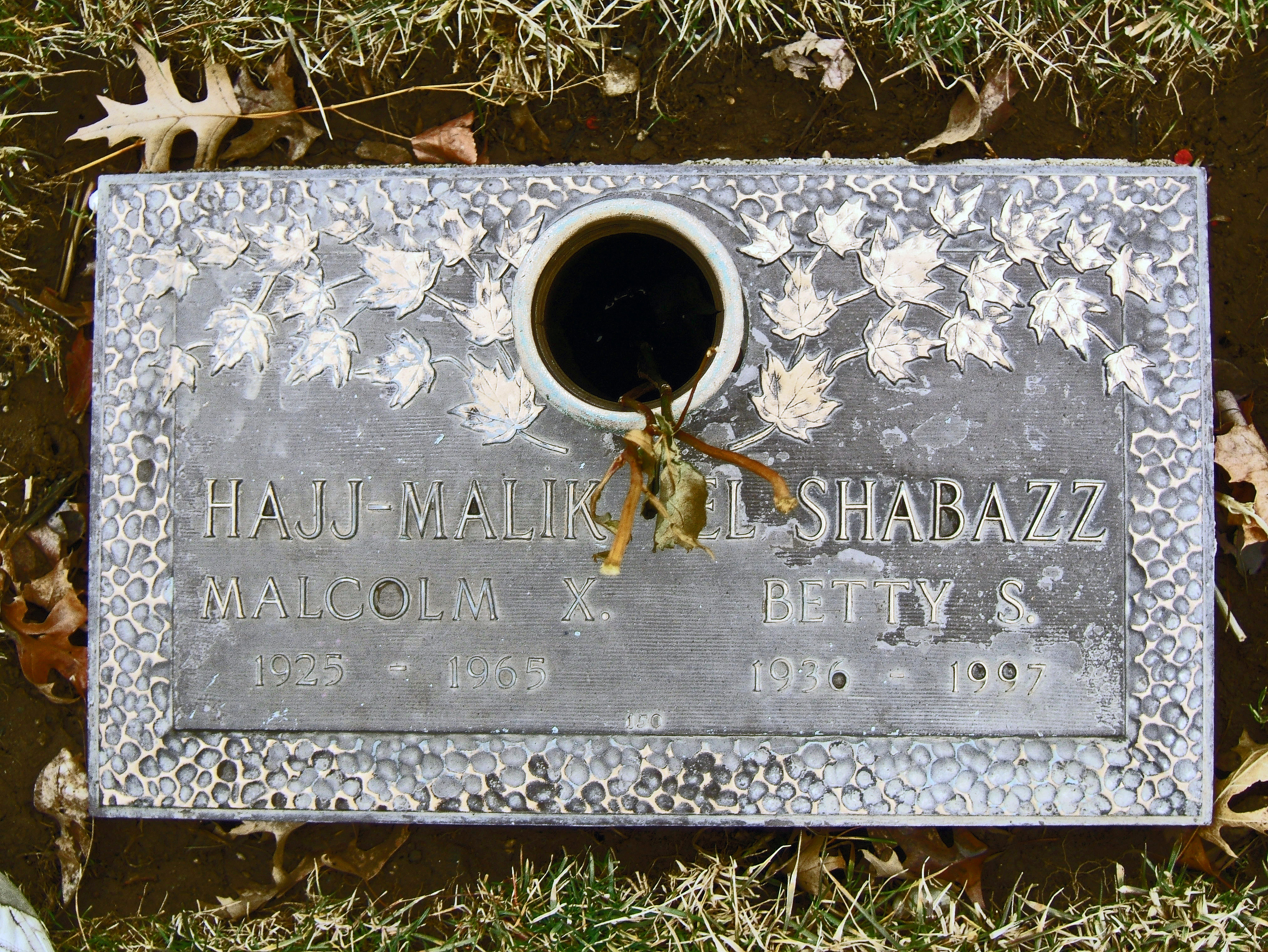
The gravesite of Malcolm X and Betty Shabazz in Ferncliff Cemetery

More than 2,000 mourners attended a memorial service for Shabazz, at New York's Riverside Church. Many prominent leaders were present, including Coretta Scott King and Myrlie Evers-Williams, poet Maya Angelou, actor-activists Ossie Davis and Ruby Dee, New York Governor George Pataki, and four New York City mayors—Abraham Beame, Ed Koch, David Dinkins, and Rudy Giuliani. U.S. Secretary of Labor Alexis Herman delivered a tribute from President Bill Clinton. In a statement released after Shabazz's death, civil rights leader Jesse Jackson said, "She never stopped giving and she never became cynical. She leaves today the legacy of one who epitomized hope and healing."

Shabazz's funeral service was held at the Islamic Cultural Center in New York City. Her public viewing was at the Unity Funeral Home in Harlem, the same place where Malcolm X's viewing had taken place 32 years earlier. Shabazz was buried next to her husband, El-Hajj Malik El-Shabazz (Malcolm X), at Ferncliff Cemetery in Hartsdale, New York.

=== Memorials ===
In late 1997, the Community Healthcare Network renamed one of its Brooklyn, New York, clinics the Dr. Betty Shabazz Health Center, in honor of Shabazz. (Note: In 2017, the Dr. Betty Shabazz Health Center was rebuilt, combined with another facility, and renamed Community Healthcare Network–East New York.) The Betty Shabazz International Charter School was founded in Chicago, Illinois, in 1998 and named in her honor. In 2005, Columbia University announced the opening of the Malcolm X and Dr. Betty Shabazz Memorial and Educational Center. The memorial is located in the Audubon Ballroom, where Malcolm X was assassinated. In March 2012, New York City co-named Broadway at the corner of West 165th Street, the corner in front of the Audubon Ballroom, Betty Shabazz Way.

== Portrayals in film and television ==
Shabazz was the subject of the 2013 television movie Betty & Coretta, in which she was played by Mary J. Blige. Angela Bassett portrayed her in the 1992 film Malcolm X and in a less prominent role in the 1995 film Panther. Yolanda King, the daughter of Martin Luther King Jr. and Coretta Scott King, played Shabazz in the 1981 television movie Death of a Prophet, and Shabazz was portrayed by Victoria Dillard in the 2001 film Ali. Joaquina Kalukango portrays her in the 2020 film One Night in Miami..., alongside Kingsley Ben-Adir as Malcolm X. Shabazz was portrayed by Grace Porter in the second season of the 2019 TV series Godfather of Harlem. In 2024, Jayme Lawson portrayed Shabazz in National Geographic’s Genius: MLK/X.

== See also ==
- Bibliography of Malcolm X
- Bibliography of Martin Luther King Jr.
