= Qubilah Shabazz =

Daughter of Malcolm X (born 1960)

- Born: December 25, 1960 (age 65); New York City, U.S.
- Education: Princeton University; University of Paris
- Children: Malcolm Shabazz (son)
- Parents: Malcolm X (father); Betty Shabazz (mother)

Qubilah Bahiyah Shabazz (born December 25, 1960) is the second daughter of Malcolm X and Betty Shabazz. In 1965, she witnessed the assassination of her father by three gunmen. She was arrested in 1995 in connection with an alleged plot to kill Louis Farrakhan, by then the leader of the Nation of Islam, who she believed was responsible for the assassination of her father. She has maintained her innocence. She accepted a plea agreement under which she was required to undergo psychological counseling and treatment for her substance use disorders to avoid a prison sentence.

== Early years ==
Shabazz was born in Brooklyn, New York, in 1960. Her father named her after Kublai Khan. Photographer and filmmaker Gordon Parks was her godfather.

In February 1965, when Qubilah was four years old, she roused her parents in the middle of the night with her screams: the family's house had been set on fire. One week later, together with her mother and sisters, she witnessed the assassination of her father.

As a youth, Qubilah Shabazz attended a Quaker-run summer camp called "Farm and Wilderness" in Vermont. At age 11, she became a Quaker, converting from Islam. With her sisters, she joined Jack and Jill, a social club for the children of well-off African Americans. As a teenager, Shabazz attended the United Nations International School in Manhattan.

After high school, she enrolled at Princeton University but was uncomfortable there, feeling that the white students were shunning her and that the African-American students resented her apparent lack of interest in their efforts to force the university to divest its investments in South Africa. She left Princeton after two semesters and moved to Paris, where she studied at the Sorbonne and worked as a translator. In Paris, she met an Algerian man with whom she had a child, Malcolm, in 1984. Their relationship subsequently ended.

When Malcolm was a few months old, Qubilah Shabazz moved with him to Los Angeles. In 1986, they went to New York City, where they lived in a series of apartments in bad neighborhoods. Shabazz drifted from city to city and job to job, supporting herself by waiting tables, selling advertising for a directory, telemarketing, and proofreading texts at a law firm. She began to drink heavily, and her mother and sisters often cared for Malcolm while Shabazz lived with various friends.

== Attempted murder of Louis Farrakhan ==
For many years, Shabazz's mother, Betty, harbored resentment toward the Nation of Islam—and Louis Farrakhan in particular—for what she felt was their role in the assassination of her husband. In a 1994 interview, her mother was asked whether Farrakhan "had anything to do" with Malcolm X's death. She replied, "Of course, yes. Nobody kept it a secret. It was a badge of honor. Everybody talked about it, yes."

Shabazz began to obsess about Farrakhan. Like her mother, she believed he was responsible for killing her father. Now, she feared, he would kill her mother. In May 1994, she contacted Michael Fitzpatrick, a friend from high school, and asked if he would kill Farrakhan for her. She later told the FBI that she chose Fitzpatrick because "I knew he was capable of doing it". However, Fitzpatrick became an FBI informant. He sometimes acted on their behalf as an agent provocateur. He had been arrested for drug possession shortly before Shabazz called him. He reported their conversation to the FBI. Fitzpatrick and Shabazz spoke frequently during June and July. She believed he was romantically interested in her. She told her neighbors that he had proposed marriage. Fitzpatrick encouraged her, allowing Malcolm to call him "my dad". In September, Qubilah and her son moved to Minneapolis, where Fitzpatrick lived. Fitzpatrick asked for money and she gave him $250. When Shabazz tried to contact him, however, his roommates told her they had evicted him. When they finally spoke, she said she was "leery" and that she was "afraid to have any involvement". She asked Fitzpatrick if he was a government informant, which he denied.

In January 1995, Shabazz was indicted on charges of using telephones and crossing state lines in the plot to kill Farrakhan. If convicted, she faced a possible sentence of 90 years in prison and fines in excess of $2 million. Farrakhan surprised Betty Shabazz when he defended Qubilah, saying he did not think she was guilty and that he hoped she would not be convicted.

Shabazz accepted a plea agreement with respect to the charges on May 1. Under the terms of the plea, she was required to undergo psychological counseling and treatment for her substance use disorders, to attend school or become employed, and to avoid further legal trouble for two years. Provided that Shabazz satisfied these conditions, the indictment against her would be dropped.

Later that month, Betty Shabazz and Farrakhan shook hands on the stage of the Apollo Theater during a public event intended to raise money for Qubilah Shabazz's legal defense. Some heralded the evening as a reconciliation between the two, but others thought Betty Shabazz was doing whatever she had to in order to protect her daughter. Regardless, nearly $250,000 was raised that evening.

== Death of Betty Shabazz and Malcolm Shabazz ==
Shabazz moved to San Antonio to undergo treatment. She worked at a radio station owned by Percy Sutton, a family friend. She married in December 1996, but the marriage was over by the end of the following month.

For the duration of Shabazz's treatment, her son Malcolm, then ten years old, was sent to live with her mother Betty in Yonkers, New York. Two years later, on June 1, 1997, Malcolm set a fire in his grandmother's apartment. Betty Shabazz suffered burns over 80% of her body and died from her injuries three weeks later. Malcolm Shabazz pleaded guilty to the juvenile equivalents of arson and manslaughter and received a sentence of 18 months in juvenile detention.

Then, in 2013, at the age of 28, her son Malcolm died due to injuries sustained in a fight over a bill at a bar in Mexico City.

== See also ==
- Bibliography of Malcolm X
- Bibliography of Martin Luther King Jr.
