= Patric Ullaeus =

Swedish director and photographer

- Occupations: Director, photographer, artist
- Website: patricullaeus.com

Patric Ullaeus is a Swedish director and photographer. He is the founder of Revolver Film Company, based in Gothenburg. With his music video "The Serpentine Offering" for Dimmu Borgir he won the "Norwegian Grammy" award Spellemannsprisen in the category Best Director in 2007.

== Music videos ==
2026

"This Time of Year" for Europe
"Saviors" for Only The Brave
”The Mission” for Dynazty
"Talk or Walk" for Velveteen Queen
”Arch Of The Sky” for Insomnium
"Scandinavian Eyes" for Europe
"The Prophecy Unfolds" for Dragonland
”Gleam in the Black” for Insomnium
"Seven" for Marylane
"Adrenaline" for Velveteen Queen
"Wolf And The Queen" for Shadowbourne
"The Cult of Ignorance" for Europe
”The Call” for Masterplan
"The Greater Good" for Velveteen Queen
”Leaving The Emptiness” for Evergrey
"Gypsy Tears" for Lex Legion
"Heaven's Falling" for Shadowbourne
"One On One" starring Peter Stormare for Europe
”Ascent” for Dimmu Borgir
”Axis” for Soen
”The World Is On Fire” for Evergrey
"Doreen" for Marylane
"Sleep Eternally" for Lex Legion
”Through The Storm” for Masterplan
”The Fever Mask” for At The Gates
”To The Last Breath” for Arch Enemy
”Chase The Light” for Masterplan
"We Are One" for Rozario

2025

"Fire and Ice" for Rozario
"Box with Spirits" for Cyhra
"Too Far Gone" for Velveteen Queen
"Diamond In The Rough" for Danko Jones
"Illuminate The Path" for Arch Enemy
"Luv U More" for Scooter Joost Paul Elstak
"Dancing Shadow" for Amorphis
"Tears Of Fire" for Primal Fear
"Bones" for Amorphis
"Liar" for Velveteen Queen
"Hunter" for Primal Fear
"Steelbound" for Battle Beast
"Last Goodbye" for Battle Beast
"In Fire Reborn" for The Haunted
"Call My Name" for H.E.A.T
"Marks of My Sins" for Cyhra
"Lilac" for Katatonia
"Running to You" for H.E.A.T
"Warhead" for The Haunted
"Bad Time for Love" for H.E.A.T
"Fire to Fight" for Dynazty
"Disaster" for H.E.A.T
"Human Fire" for Wig Wam
"Call of the Night" for Dynazty

2024

"Whisper" for Sliding Doörs
"Game of Faces" for Dynazty
"Blinded by the Light" for Seventh Crystal
"Path of the Absurd" for Seventh Crystal
"Cradle to the Grave" for Simone Simons feat Alissa White-Gluz
"Don't You Love It - live version" for Blues Pills
"Wayward Eyes" for Dark Tranquillity
"Devilry of Ecstasy" for Dynazty
"Avenge the Fallen" for Hammerfall
"Gravitate" for Melissa Bonny
"Bad Choices" for Blues Pills
"Dream Stealer" for Arch Enemy
"Fight in the Night" for Dream Evil
"Not Nothing" for Dark Tranquillity
"Heroes of the World" for Only The Brave feat. Snowy Shaw
"Chosen Force" for Dream Evil
"In Love We Rust" for Simone Simons
"The End Justifies" for Hammerfall
"Metal Gods" for Dream Evil
"Still Burning" for Bridear
"Hear My Song" for Anette Olzon
"The Darkness" for Sliding Doors
"Aeterna" for Simone Simons
"One" for Apocalyptica ft. James Hetfield & Rob Trujillo
"In Darkness" for Cemetery Skyline
"Say" for Evergrey
"Hail to the King" for Hammerfall
"In the Mean Time" for Lacuna Coil
"Don't You Love It" for Blues Pills
"Rapture" for Anette Olzon
"Falling from the Sun" for Evergrey
"The Unforgiven II" for Apocalyptica
"Violent Storm" for Cemetery Skyline
"Ominous" for Evergrey
"The Four Horsemen" for Apocalyptica ft. Rob Trujillo
"The Catalyst" for Amaranthe
"Dreamer" for Velveteen Queen
"Re-Vision" for Amaranthe

2023

"Barrel of a Gun" for Velveteen Queen
"Doomsday Party" for DragonForce feat Elize Ryd
"What We're Up Against" for Apocalyptica feat Elize Ryd
"Outer Dimensions" for Amaranthe
"Take Me Higher" for Velveteen Queen
"Raise" for Six Foot Six
"I Believed" for Sliding Doors
"Insatiable" for Amaranthe
"Seven Minutes from Sunset" for Redemption
"Ashlight" for Cyhra
"The Golden Trail" for Nita Strauss Feat. Anders Fridén
"Norma" for John Norum
"This Is Not a Test" for Obilivion Protocol
"Life Is a Hurricane" for Cyhra
"Calling" for John Norum
"How to Hate Again" for Rave The Reqviem feat. Jake E
"Echo" for Art Nation
"Brutal & Beautiful" for Art Nation
"Hunt the Flame" for Magnus Carlsson's Freefall
"Wonderland" for Seventh Chrystal
"Meet Your Maker" for In Flames
"Higer Ground" for Seventh Chrystal
"Operation Phoenix" for Crowne

2022

"In the Name of the Fallen" for Crowne
"Out of the Dark" for Wig Wam
"Champions" for Crowne
"Sirens - Of Blood And Water with Simone Simons feat. Charlotte Wessels, Myrkur for Epica
"Gone to Stay" for John Norum
"Find Life" for Amaranthe
"Ready to Rumble" for Cyhra
"One by One" for John Norum
"The Great Deceiver" at Dalhalla for In Flames
"Death, Where Is Your Sting" for Avatarium
"Learning to Breath" for Taboo
"Apologize" for Ginevra
"This Means War" for Nordic Union
"Bleeding" for Taboo
"Voices of Silence" for John Norum
"Natural Born Killer" for Dynazty
"Unbreakable" for Ginevra
"State of Slow Decay" for In Flames
"In Every Waking Hour" for Nordic Union
"Wendy" for COME
"Sail On" for John Norum
"Blindfolded" for Evergrey
"Midwinter Calls" for Evergrey
"Brotherhood" for Hammerfall
"Save Us" for Evergrey
"Handshake with Hell" for Arch Enemy
"Let It Hurt" for Silent Skies
"Wings of Light" for Battle Beast
"Venerate Me" for Hammerfall
"Leaving" for Silent Skies

2021

"Hammer of Dawn" for Hammerfall
"The Moon" for Amorphis
"Deceiver, Deceiver" for Arch Enemy
"Mantra Meditation" for Jord
"Ship of Lies" for Danko Jones
"Järnhand" for Thyrfing
"Déjà Vu" for [Seventh Crystal]
"The Nightmare of Being" for At the Gates
"Parasite" for Anette Olzon
"The Paradox" for At the Gates
"Collapsing" for Dead by April
"Indestructible" for Solence
"Spectre of Extinction" for At the Gates
"Where Love Comes to Die" for The Unguided
"Döp Dem I Eld" for Thyrfing
"I Want Out" for Danko Jones
"Heartbeat Failing" for Dead by April
"Where August Mourns" for Evergrey
"Eternal Nocturnal" for Evergrey

2020

"Twenty Twenty One" for League Of Lights
"Here Comes the Rain Again" for Silent Skies
"Welcome to Your Nightmare" for Six Foot Six
"Stay with Me" for In Flames
"FCK 2020" for Scooter
"Dance the Night Away - 2020 Lockdown Session V" for Europe
"Rock the Night - 2020 Lockdown Session IV" for Europe
"Drink and a Smile - 2020 Lockdown Session III" for Europe
"Firebox - 2020 Lockdown Session II" for Europe
"Got to Have Faith - 2020 Lockdown Session I" for Europe
"Devil in Me" for Cronic
"Solitude" for Silent Skies
"Walls" for Redemption
"Indulge in Color" for Redemption feat. Chris Poland
"Bossbitch" for Scarlet feat. Thirsty & Åsa Netterbrant
"Crown Prince Syndrome" for The Unguided
"Only for the Weak 2020" for In Flames
"Dreams Gone Wrong" for Cyhra
"Low Road" for Blues Pills
"Beauty & Beast" for Scarlet
"Fake Suicide" for Pain City
"Low Road" for Blues Pills
"Carved in Stone" for We Sell The Dead
"Second to One" for HammerFall feat. Noora Louhimo

2019

"Black Sleep" for We Sell The Dead
"Across the Water" for We Sell The Dead
"Shadow in the Dark" for Searching For Serenity
"GG6" for Amaranthe
"Tell Me How" for Mister Misery
"Not Your Monster" for The Dark Element
"Alive" for Mister Misery
"Masquerade" for Eclipse
"Out of My Life" for Cyhra
"Fists up High" for Danko Jones
"Viva La Victoria" for Eclipse
"Mislead" for Tungsten
"The Blood Waltz" for Mister Misery
"Helix" for Amaranthe
"Who Failed the Most" for Sonata Arctica
"Songs the Night Sings" for The Dark Element
"Cold" for Sonata Arctica
"The Fairies Dance" for Tungsten
"Luxferre" for Samael
"All I Have" for Evergrey
"My Ghost" for Mister Misery
"We Will Rise" for Tungsten
"End of Silence" for Evergrey
"Horizons" for Silent Skies
"Weightless" for Evergrey

2018

"I Am Above" for In Flames
"Yggdrasil" for Brothers Of Metal
"Reason to Believe" for Arch Enemy
"Time of Losses" for Catharsis
"A Silent Arc" for Evergrey
"President Evil" for Last Union featuring James LaBrie
"Prophecy of Ragnarök" for Brothers Of Metal
"Forsaken by God" for InSammer
"Countdown" for Amaranthe
"Virus Inside" for The Six Foot Project
"365" for Amaranthe
"Someone Else's Problem" for Redemption
"The Siege" for Europe
"Council of Wolves and Snakes" for Dimmu Borgir
"Seeds" for InSammer
"The Portal" for Alight
"To Drink from the Night Itself" for At the Gates
"Interdimensional Summit" for Dimmu Borgir
"The System" for InSammer
"Heartrage" for CyHra
"Deadweight" for Crawl Back To Zero
"Nothin' on You" for Jamie Meyer

2017

"Inside" for Matt Guillory
"Hollywood Dreams" for Spiral Key
"The Race" for Arch Enemy
"Walk the Earth" for Europe
"My Sweet Mystery" for The Dark Element
"Karma" for CyHra
"The Eagle Flies Alone" for Arch Enemy
"Breaking the Ice" for Ice Age
"The World Is Yours" for Arch Enemy
"Save Me" In Flames
"Son of Sun" for Tikahiri
"Antidote" for Dream Evil
"Dream Evil" for Dream Evil
"Warrior" for Dead by April
"Cloud Connected" live for In Flames
"Nemesis Live at Wacken" for Arch Enemy
"Nichts Spricht Wahre Liebe Frei" for Stahlmann
"Boomerang" for Amaranthe
"War Eternal Live at Wacken" for Arch Enemy

2016

"In Orbit" for Evergrey
"When The World Explodes" feat. Emilia Feldt live for In Flames
"That Song" for Amaranthe
"Only for the Weak" live for In Flames
"The Impossible" for Evergrey
"The Truth" In Flames
"The End" In Flames
"The Chosen Pessimist" live for In Flames
"Take This Life" live for In Flames
"The Paradox of the Flame" for Evergrey
"Everything's Gone" live for In Flames
"The Faint Pulse of Light" for Solution .45
"Distance" for Evergrey
"Winternight" for Visions Of Atlantis
"Forever" for Nemesea
"Dying Young" for Tikahiri
"Holy Ground to Me" for Jamie Meyer
"Suckerpunch" for Delain
"Enraged" for The Unguided

2015

"Alter (The Unbearable Weight Of Nothing)" for Solution .45
"Put You Underground" for Tikahiri
"What Lies Below" for Gus G feat. Elize Ryd
"V8 Car" for Tikahiri
"True" for Amaranthe
"Krossat Glas" for Lillasyster
"Nothin' to Ya" live for Europe
"Braveheart" for Civil War
"My Own City" for Oslo Soul Teens
"Yara's Song" for Mustasch
"Morrigan" for Children of Bodom
"Brand New Revolution" for Gus G
"Black Undertow" for Evergrey
"Digital World" for Amaranthe
"Days of Rock'n'Roll" for Europe
"Close Your Eyes" for Jack Action
"Be Like a Man" for Mustasch
"Paralyzed" for In Flames
"War of Kings" for Europe

2014

"The Grand Collapse" for Evergrey
"Long Way Down" for Gus G featuring Alexia Rodriguez
"No Hope Left for Me" for Blues Pills
"Death and the Labyrinth" for At the Gates
"Drop Dead Cynical" for Amaranthe
"Through Oblivion" for In Flames
"King of Errors" for Evergrey
"Rusted Nail" for In Flames
"This Could Be Something" for Anton Ewald feat. Medina
"Before You Finally Break (feat. Björn 'Speed' Strid) for Sonic Syndicate
"You Will Know My Name" for Arch Enemy
"Eyes Wide Open" for Gus G
"You Better Give Up Now" for Amanda Fondell
"No More Regrets" for Arch Enemy
"Love" for Sonata Arctica
"Design the Century" for Timo Tolkki feat Floor Jansen
"War Eternal" for Arch Enemy
"I Am the Fire" for Gus G
"Wolves Die Young" for Sonata Arctica
"Lies" for Anette Olzon
"Whole World Is Watching" for Within Temptation feat Piotr Rogucki
"Whole World Is Watching" for Within Temptation feat Dave Pirner
"My Will Be Done" for Gus G
"Roar" for Lillasyster

2013

"Dangerous" for Within Temptation feat Howard Jones
"Endless Nights" for Chrome Division
"Invincible" for Amaranthe
"Sound of a Playground Fading" for In Flames
"Point Zero Solution" for Deals Death
"Money, Blood & Crucifixus" for DeathDestruction
"The Wanderer" for Amorphis
"Burn with Me" for Amaranthe
"Clearing the Slate" for The Resistance
"Uniformity" for Dark Tranquillity
"Hopeless Days" for Amorphis
"Save Me My Love" for Tikahiri
"Enshrined in My Memory" for Timo Tolkki feat Elize Ryd
"Into the Ocean" for Minora
"The Nexus" for Amaranthe
"I'll Fight for You" for Ankor

2012

"My Own Angel" for Ankor
"A Song for the Weak" for ToxicRose
"Borderline" for The 69 Eyes
"Paris Paris" for Liv Kristine
"I've Been You" for Mnemic
"Plenty of Love" for Mic Donet
"RED" for The 69 Eyes
"Firebox" for Europe
"Get Out of the Way" for NitroDive
"Ray of Love - Denzal Park rmx" for Tune In Tokyo
"Under Black Flag We March" for Arch Enemy
"Ray of Love" for Tune In Tokyo
"Collapse" for Deals Death
"Not Supposed to Sing the Blues" for Europe
"Delenda" for Soen
"Completely Frozen" for Ankor
"The Challenger" for Mustasch
"Savia" for Soen

2011

"Phoenix Down" for The Unguided
"Where the Dead Ships Dwell" for In Flames
"Party in My Head" for September
"Communicate the Storm" for Cipher System
"Amaranthine" for Amaranthe
"Me and My Microphone" for September
"Ghost Riders in the Sky" for Chrome Division
"Hearts in the Air" for Eric Saade
"Deliver Us" for In Flames
"Luxferre" for Samael
"One More Time" for HammerFall
"Fuck Yeah" for Deathdestruction
"Bulldogs Unleashed" for Chrome Division
"Yesterday Is Dead and Gone" for Arch Enemy
"To France" for Leaves' Eyes
"Remaining" for Ankor
"Hunger" for Amaranthe
"Wrong" for Evergrey
"Sex, Bass & Rock'n'Roll 2K11" for Brooklyn Bounce vs. Dj's From Mars

2010

"The End of It All" for Sirenia
"30 Minutes to Rock" for Lori!Lori!
"Midnight Vice" for Enforcer
"Resuscitate Me" for September
"Club Bizarre" for Brooklyn Bounce
"All for You" for Ace of Base
"Embrace the Sun" for Firewind
"The Ballad" for Dream Evil
"World on Fire" for Firewind
"Feel You" for Magnus Carlsson
"Skintight" for Liv Kristine
"My Own Life" for Sonic Syndicate
"Bang Your Head" for Dream Evil
"Revolution Baby" for Sonic Syndicate
"At Midnight They Get Wise" for Grand Magus
"Island of Light" for Indica
"Diesel Uterus" for Mnemic
"Hammer of the North" for Grand Magus
"In Passing" for Indica
"Closer" for Misconduct

2009

"Burn This City" for Sonic Syndicate
"New Love in Town" for Europe
"Kolo" for Larry & Mike
"My Destiny" for Leaves' Eyes
"Hold Me Back" for Nitro Dive
"Last Look at Eden" for Europe
"Be Free" for Kaatchi
"Delight and Angers" for In Flames
"Kulisser" for Dia Psalma
"Breakout" for Union Square
"The Path to Decay" for Sirenia

2008

"The Watcher" for Enslaved
"Broken Wings" for Evergrey
"Alias" for In Flames
"My Escape" for Sonic Syndicate
"Jack of Diamonds" for Sonic Syndicate
"Deceit" for Union Square
"Ascendant" for Keep of Kalessin
"I Will Live Again" for Arch Enemy
"Mercenary Man" for Firewind

2007

"Revolution Begins" for Arch Enemy
"Que Si, Que No" for Hot Banditoz
"Enclave" for Sonic Syndicate
"Breaking the Silence" for Firewind feat. Tara Teresa
"Denied" for Sonic Syndicate
"That's Why I Despise You" for Dew-Scented
"The Serpentine Offering" for Dimmu Borgir

2006

"Blind Evil" for Dream Evil
"Living Dead Beat" for Children of Bodom
"Meaningsless" for Mnemic
"Fire! Battle! In Metal!" for Dream Evil
"When the Lights Are Down" for Kamelot
"Abandoned" for Kamelot
"I Was Made for Lovin' You" for Mini Rockerz
"Last Injection" for M.A.N
"Close to You" for Pachanga
"La Cucaracha Dance" for Hot Banditoz
"Serial Killer" for Chrome Division
"21st Century Digital Girl" for Groove Coverage
"Falling to Pieces" for Firewind
"Monday Morning Apocalypse" for Evergrey
"One" for ANJ
"Take This Life" for In Flames
"Sorgens Kammer Del II" for Dimmu Borgir

2005

"Sex, Bass & Rock 'n' Roll" for Brooklyn Bounce
"Schuld" for Heiland
"R U Ready" for Dirrrty Green
"My Sweet Shadow" for In Flames
"F(r)iend" for In Flames
"Dial 595 - Escape" for In Flames
"Episode 666" for In Flames
"Evil in a Closet" for In Flames
"We Got It All" for Kee Marcello feat Alannah Myles
"What About It" for Lutricia McNeal
"More Than Ever" for Evergrey
"March of Mephisto" for Kamelot feat Shagrath
"The Haunting" for Kamelot
"Borders and Shading" for In Flames

2004

"Runaway" for Groove Covarage
"Vredesbyrd" for Dimmu Borgir
"Deathbox" for Mnemic
"A Touch of Red" for In Flames
"Munsters!" for Notre Dame
"Crazy" for Brooklyn Bounce
"Trashed, Lost & Strungout" for Children Of Bodom
"These Are the Changes" for Ray Wilson
"A Touch of Blessing" for Evergrey
"Swamped" for Lacuna Coil
"The Book of Heavy Metal" for Dream Evil
"The Quiet Place" for In Flames
"Lake of Sulphur" for The Great Deceiver

2003

"Liquid" for Mnemic
"Heaven's a Lie" for Lacuna Coil
"X2X" for Brooklyn Bounce
"Cain" for Tiamat
"Progenies of the Great Apocalypse" for Dimmu Borgir
"System" for In Flames
"Ghost" for Mnemic
"In Reverse" for Passenger
"Ice Queen" for Within Temptation
"Rain Down on Me" for Kane

2002

"Natural High" for Marc Sway
"Amigos Forever" for Alex C feat Yasmin K
"Posse" UK version for Scooter
"Cotton Eye Joe '02" for Rednex
"Nobody's Laughing" for Freak Kitchen
"Disconnect Massconnect" for Transport League
"Tell Me" for NG3
"Will It Ever" for Natural
"Didn't I" for Daizz
"She Moves" for Karaja
"Set Me Free" for ATC
"Rhythm of the Night" for Alex C feat Yasmin K
"Perfect Love" for Lutricia McNeal
"Wherever You Are" for Laava
"Mother Earth" for Within Temptation
"Suddenly" for Tara
"I Feel So Good" for Mr. Freeman
"Geisha Dreams" for Rollergirl
"Saturday Night" for The Underdog Project
"Wondering" for Tara

2001

"I Believe" for Bro'Sis
"The Chase" for Rednex
"Club Bizarre" for Brooklyn Bounce
"Aii Shot the DJ" for Scooter
"Summertime" for Siesto
"I'm in Heaven When You Kiss Me" for ATC
"Close to You" for Rollergirl
"Do You Remember" for Sungirlz
"Posse (I Need You On The Floor)" for Scooter
"Fühlst Du Mich" for Zee
"Off" for No Name
"Back to Haunt Me" for Tanya Stephens
"Du Wirst Sehen 2001" for Nana
"If I Used to Love You" for Daniel Lemma
"I Can't Handle It" for The Underdog Project
"Why Haven't I Told You" for Prima Donna
"Why Oh Why" for ATC

2000

"Du Wirst Sehen" for Nana
"Thinking of You" for ATC
"Hold Me" for Rednex
"Everytime I Hear" for Siesto
"Never Gonna Give You Up" for Spike
"Superstar" for Rollergirl
"Open Sesame" for Daisy Dee feat Leila K
"Chemical Reaction" for Sasha
"The Spirit of the Hawk" for Rednex
"All I Wanna Know" for The 7 inch Project
"Summer Jam" for The Underdog Project
"Hitgirl" for Selma
"Do U Wanna Die" for AK Swift
"No Regrets" for Pandora

1999

"Love Is the Answer" for Daisy Dee
"C'est la Vie" for Ace of Base
"I Cry" for Ray Horton
"I Wanna Fly (Like An Eagle)" for Nana
"On and On" for Toni Cottura
"Whatever" for Alex Prince
"365 Days" for Lutricia McNeal
"Sån Är Jag" for Bam B
"I Feel Lonely" for Sasha
"Outside World" for Sunbeam
"Say You Will Be Mine" for Shemsi
"Because I Love You" for Ray Horton
"A Twist of Fate" for Emilia
"One Love" for January
"Watch Me Now" for David Tainton

1998

"Shepherd in the Storm" for United Booya Family (U.B.F.)
"A Child Is Born" for Lutricia McNeal
"Changing the Moods" for The Tuesdays
"The Greatest Love You'll Never Know" for Lutricia McNeal
"Father" for Nana
"Father rmx" for Nana
"Do You Know" for Krazee Alley
"Down on the Street" for D'Sound
"Dreams" for Nana
"Honey Luv" for Pappa Bear
"Remember the Time" for Nana
"Emergency" for Operator
"How We Are Living" for Alex Prince feat Mazaya & Toni Cottura
"My Life" for Toni Cottura
"When the Rain Begins to Fall" for Pappa Bear
"A Better Way" for Will Powa feat Tara
"We Love Money" for Markus Anthony

1997

"Too Much Heaven" for Nana
"Bible in My Hand" for United Booya Family (U.B.F.)
"Sweet Thang" for Jonestown
"We'll Stay" for Dilba
"All the Way" for Homeboyz
"He's Coming" for Nana
"Cherish" for Pappa Bear
"In da Game" for AK Swift
"Hey You" for Daisy Dee
"Let It Rain rmx" for Nana
"Let It Rain" for Nana
"Light in Me" for AK Swift
"Lonely" for Nana
"What Is Going On" for Beat System
"Straight out'a Persia" for Ro-Cee
"Love Is a Wonderful Thing" for Fatima Rainey
"Party Boom" for Toni Cottura feat N'Sync & AK Swift
"The Way We Like It" for Eva Sarojini
"Just for You" for Masterboy

1996

"Instant Repeater '99" for The Soundtrack Of Our Lives
"Ain't That Just the Way" for Lutricia McNeal
"Darkman" for Nana
"I'm Sorry" for Dilba
"Show Respect" for Ro-Cee
"Da Bomb" for Inner Circle
"I Love Girls" for Inner Circle
"Up 'n' Down" for George
"Ride" for Infinite Mass
"Easy Come Easy Go" for Scrappy G
"Individuality" for Stonefunkers
"Getting' All the Babes" for Ro-Cee
"Unreal" for Dream World
"Area Turns Red" for Infinite Mass
"Seeking" for B-Thong
"Vill Du Bli Min Fru" for Drängarna
"Latinos Somos" for Los Reyes Latino
"Neverchange" for Sharp Nine
"Mah Boyz" for Infinite Mass

1990-1995

"Seeking" for B-Thong
"Light of My Life" for Anbessa
"Wait for a Minute" for Whipped Cream
"Too Many People" for 10th Level
"Insane Alone" for Eleven Pictures
"Itsypooked" for Road Ratt
"Shi-Wo-Wo" for Dr. Alban
"Stubborn Little Fella" for Punk Funk Union
"Shake It Up" for Road Ratt
"We Will Be One" for Elevate
"Delirious" for Tornado Babies
"Rag Man City" for Road Ratt
"Schizophrenic Pavement" for B-Thong
"Like an Egyptian" for Blue For Two
"Time" for Leila K

== Concert films and documentaries ==
"Alive In Color" for Redemption
"Live From Borgholm Brinner" for In Flames
"Live From Studio Fredman 2020" for Dream Evil
"Borgholm Brinner The Documentary" for In Flames
"Europe At Abbey Road" for Europe
"The Final Countdown 30th Anniversary Show - Live At The Roundhouse" for Europe
"As The Stages Burn!" for Arch Enemy
"Sounds From The Heart Of Gothenburg" for In Flames
"War Of Kings Special Edition - Live in Wacken" for Europe
"Live At Sweden Rock - 30th Anniversary Show" for Europe
"Gates Of Dalhalla" for HammerFall
"Used & Abused - In Live We Trust" for In Flames
"One Cold Winter's Night" for Kamelot
"Chaos Ridden Years - Stockholm Knockout Live" for Children Of Bodom
"A Night To Remember" for Evergrey
"Live At Scandinavium" for Tara Teresa
"Gold Medal In Metal" for Dream Evil
"Come Clarity limited edition bonus DVD" for In Flames
"In Sorte Diaboli" limited edition bonus DVD for Dimmu Borgir
"The Making of Slaughter of the Soul" - Documentary for At the Gates

== Art exhibitions ==
RockART @ Galleri Interart in Gothenburg, Sweden. September 2016
RockART @ Tjuvholmen in Oslo, Norway. May 2014
RockART @ Mini BlackBox in Gothenburg, Sweden. May 2012
RockART @ Galleri Nils Åberg in Gothenburg, Sweden. January 2012
RockART @ 7H in Kinna, Sweden. November 2011
RockART @ Gothia Towers in Gothenburg, Sweden. November 2010
RockART @ Ulfsunda Slott in Stockholm, Sweden. October 2010
RockART @ Mornington Hotel, Gothenburg, Sweden. May 2010
RockART @ L2 in Stockholm, Sweden. April 2010
RockART @ Frankfurt Messe, Germany. March 2010
RockART @ LUXE Gallery in New York City, USA. March 2010
RockART @ RAG (rEvolver Art Gallery) in Gothenburg, Sweden. November 2009
