= Ralf Gyllenhammar =

Swedish musician (born 1966)

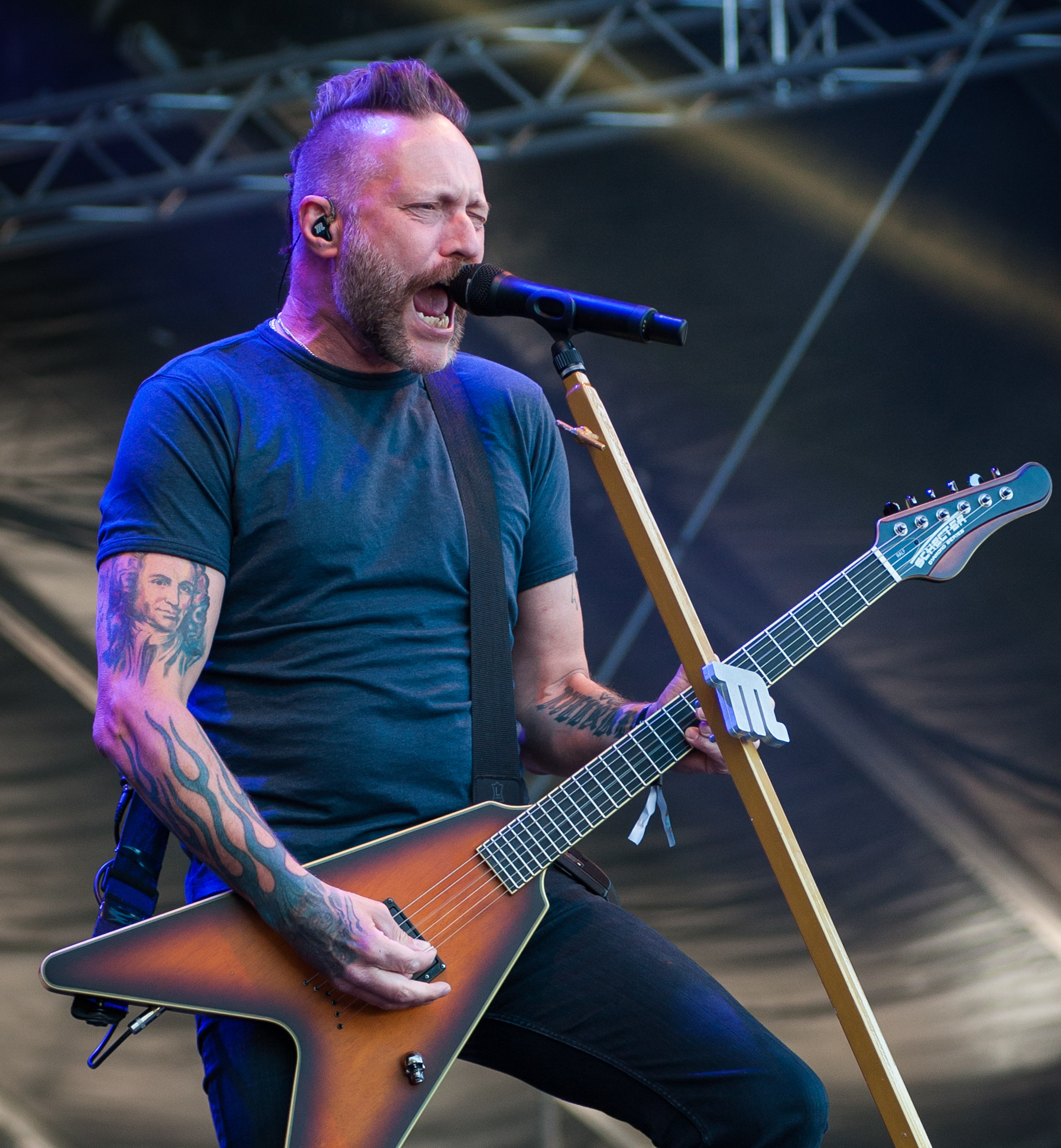
- Gyllenhammar with Mustasch in 2018

Background information
- Also known as: Röjar-Ralf; Riff-Ralf; Riff-Raffe
- Born: Rafael Wolfgang Sebek; 1 July 1966 (age 60); Gothenburg, Sweden
- Genres: Hard rock; heavy metal
- Occupations: Singer; musician; songwriter
- Instruments: Vocals; guitar
- Member of: Mustasch
- Formerly of: B-Thong

Ralf Rafael Gyllenhammar (born Rafael Wolfgang Sebek; 1 July 1966) is a Swedish musician. He is the frontman of the rock/metal band Mustasch and was also the frontman of B-Thong with whom he released one album, From Strength to Strength in 1997, shortly before the band's breakup.

In 2007, his work with Klipptoppen earned him an award as the best "Alternative Presenter of the Year". Gyllenhammar was also one of several guest artists on the double disc soundtrack for the Swedish drama series Upp Till Kamp. Currently Gyllenhammar is endorsed by Schecter guitars which he tunes to drop C tuning and Blackstar Amplification.

== Melodifestivalen ==
Gyllenhammar took part in Melodifestivalen 2013 with the song "Bed on Fire", in a bid to represent Sweden in the Eurovision Song Contest 2013. He sang in the semi-final 4 held on 23 February 2013 and came 1st/2nd, thus qualifying directly to the final on 9 March 2013. The song is co-written by him and David Wilhelmsson.

== Discography ==
Studio albums

Year	Album	Peak positions	Certification
Year	Album	SWE	Certification
2013	Bed on Fire	19	

Solo singles

Title	Year	Peak positions	Certification	Album
Title	Year	SWE	Certification	Album
"Bed on Fire"	2013	10	GLF: Platinum	Bed on Fire

With Mustasch

(Selective albums and EPs)

- 2001: The True Sound of the New West (EP)
- 2002: Above All
- 2003: Ratsafari
- 2005: Powerhouse
- 2006: Parasite! (EP)
- 2007: Latest Version of the Truth
- 2008: Lowlife Highlights (compilation)
- 2011: The New Sound of the True Best (compilation; old tracks re-recorded)
- 2012: Sounds Like Hell Looks Like Heaven
- 2014: Thank You for the Demon
- 2015: Testosterone
