= Dark Element =

Dark Element, The Dark Element or Dark Elements may refer to:

- The Dark Element, a Finnish–Swedish musical group
- The Dark Element (album), a 2017 album by The Dark Element
- Dark Elements, a book series by Jennifer Armentrout
- Dark Element, a character in the video game Dark Chronicle
