= Mnemic =

Danish metal band

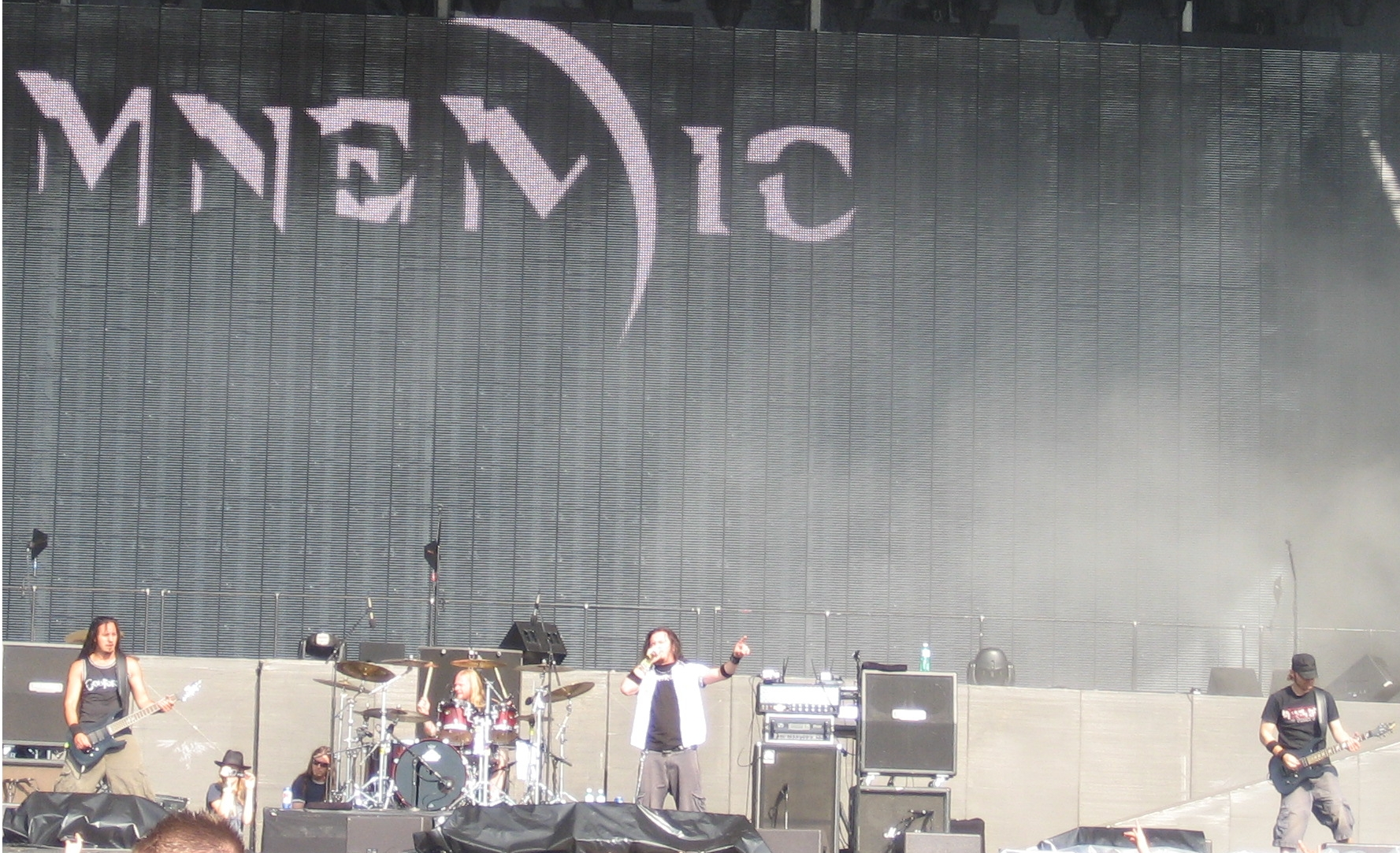
- Mnemic performing in 2008

Background information
- Origin: Aalborg, Denmark
- Genres: Industrial metal, thrash metal, progressive metal, nu metal, groove metal
- Years active: 1998–2013, 2024–present
- Label: Nuclear Blast
- Members: Mircea Gabriel Eftemie; Brian "Brylle" Rasmussen; Rune Stigart; Tomas "OBeast" Koefoed; Michael Bøgballe
- Past members: Guillaume Bideau; Simone Bertozzi; Brian Larsen; Mikkel Larsen; Mark Bai; Victor-Ray Salomonsen
- Website: mnemic.com

Mnemic /ˈniːmɪk/ is a Danish heavy metal band formed in Aalborg in 1998. The band personally describes themselves as "Future Fusion Metal". The band dissolved in 2013, but in February 2024, the band announced their reunion, and will start touring in 2025.

Mnemic have charted in the top 100 in Denmark with The Audio Injected Soul and were the first Danish metal band to open the Orange Stage at Roskilde Festival in 2004, one of Europe's biggest mainstream festivals. They have worked with Down and Fugees producer Warren Riker on the Passenger album, collaborated with Roy Z (Judas Priest and Bruce Dickinson producer), and were featured on the soundtracks of Alone in the Dark, Echo and Nordkraft films.

== History ==
=== 1998–2004: Formation and Mechanical Spin Phenomena ===
Mnemic (the Greek word for "memory" and an acronym for 'Mainly Neurotic Energy Modifying Instant Creation') was formed in the town of Aalborg, Denmark in 1998, by vocalist Mark Bai, guitarist Mircea Gabriel Eftemie, guitarist Rune Stigart, bassist Mikkel Larsen and ex-Invocator session drummer Brian Rasmussen. Some times later, Bai left the band to pursue other interests and was replaced by Michael Bøgballe. The band were signed to Nuclear Blast Records, and produced their first album Mechanical Spin Phenomena in 2003 with producer Tue Madsen. After the recording of the album, Larsen was replaced by ex-Grope bassist Tomas "OBeast" Koefoed.

The band toured with Disbelief, Darkane, Mystic Prophecy and Death Angel in Europe, and alongside Machine Head in Germany.

=== 2004–2006: The Audio Injected Soul, vocalist change ===
In 2004, Mnemic recorded their second album The Audio Injected Soul, at AntFarm Studios in Århus, Denmark with Madsen. The album was notable for including a cover version of Duran Duran's "Wild Boys", and also for being the first album in the world to be recorded using binaural recording technology. This style of recording allowed enhanced audio for listeners with special head sets. The album debuted at 97 in the national Danish album charts.

The album spawned two music videos, "Deathbox" (directed by Patric Ulleaus), which was filmed at the Revolver Studios in Gothenburg, and "Door 2.12", which was filmed in Berlin.

In 2005, vocalist Bøgballe left the band and was replaced by former Transport League and B-Thong vocalist Tony Jelencovich. Jelencovich filled in for the band's North American tour with Meshuggah, but was subsequently replaced in April 2006 by ex-Scarve vocalist Guillaume Bideau.

=== 2006–2010: Passenger ===
Mnemic's third studio album, titled Passenger, was produced by Christian Olde Wolbers of Fear Factory, featuring artwork by Asterik Studios, and guest vocals by Jeff Walker (of Carcass and Brujeria) and Shane Embury (of Napalm Death and Brujeria). The album spawned a music video for the song "Meaningless", directed by Patric Ullaeus of the Revolver Film company.

The album was released in February 2007, with the Japanese version containing a bonus track, titled "Zero Synchronized".

=== 2010–2012: Sons of the System, departures ===
Mnemic's fourth album Sons of the System was distributed via Nuclear Blast Records, and released in Europe on 15 January 2010 and in North America on 26 January 2010. It was recorded in the band's own studio, with producer Tue Madsen (who worked with the band on previous releases Mechanical Spin Phenomena and The Audio Injected Soul). Sons of the System includes 11 tracks, plus three bonus tracks (including a worldwide iTunes exclusive and a remix available in North America only). The band described the production of the album as "Very eclectic, very diverse, and nothing that you would imagine coming from a band like us. Let's just say it has become more theatrical, more electronic, and just more catchy, as we have put all our focus on writing good songs and not being afraid of experimenting."

In 2011, longtime members of Mnemic guitarist Rune Stigart, bassist Tomas Cowan Koefoed and drummer Brian Rasmussen left the band, leaving Mircea Gabriel Eftemie as the only original founding member.

=== 2012–2013: Mnemesis, disbandment, death of Bideau ===
The band's fifth album, Mnemesis, was released in June 2012, their first album with new members guitarist Victor-Ray Salomonsen Ronander, bassist Simone Bertozzi and drummer Brian Larsen. In November 2013 the band announced that guitarist Victor-Ray Salomonsen Ronander had chosen to leave the band and they will play one final show with him in Copenhagen on 28 November 2013, before taking a break. Later in 2013, the band disbanded, though no official announcements were ever made.

Vocalist Guillaume Bideau died on May 24, 2022 at the age of 44. No cause of death was given.

=== 2024–present: Reunion ===
In February 2024, the band announced their reunion, and will start touring in 2025 to celebrate the 20th anniversary of The Audio Injected Soul, with that era's lineup of Eftemie, Stigart, Koefoed, Rasmussen and Bøgballe. The band played a series of festivals throughout Europe, namely in Denmark, but also in Finland, Germany, and the Czech Republic.

In late 2025, the band announced that they were recording a new album, the first in 14 years.

== Members ==
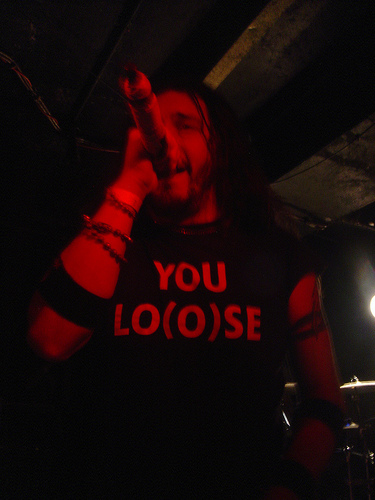
Guillaume Bideau

=== Current ===
- Michael Bøgballe – vocals (2001–2005, 2024–present)
- Mircea Gabriel Eftemie – guitars, keyboards (1998–2013, 2024–present)
- Rune Stigart – guitars, keyboards (1998–2011, 2024–present)
- Tomas "Obeast" Koefoed – bass, backing vocals (live) (2003–2011, 2024–present)
- Brian "Brylle" Rasmussen – drums (1998–2011, 2024–present)

=== Former ===
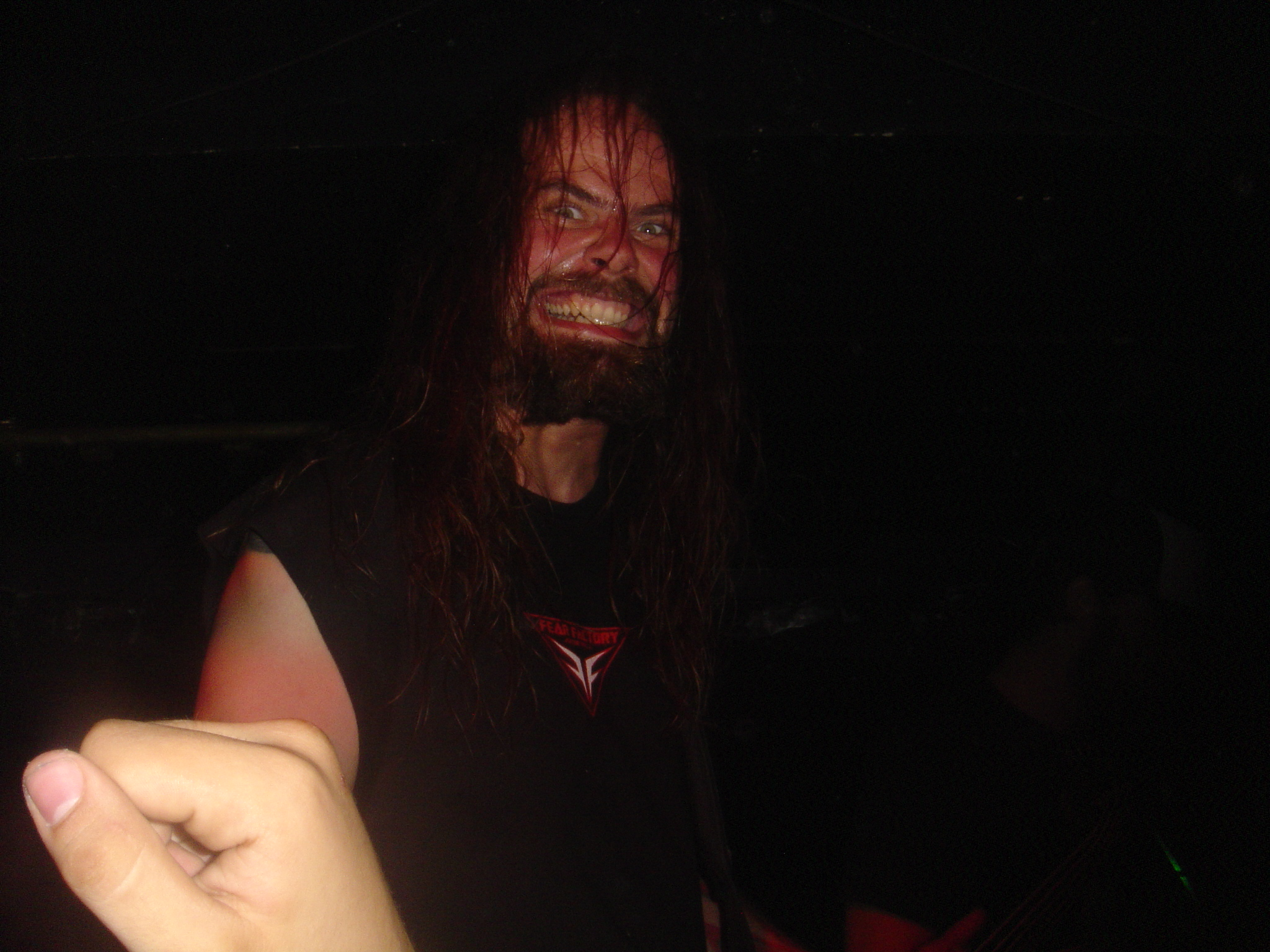
Tomas "OBeast" Koefoed in 2007

- Mikkel Larsen – bass (1998–2003)
- Mark Bai – vocals (1998–2001)
- Guillaume Bideau – vocals (2006–2013; died 2022)
- Victor-Ray Salomonsen Ronander – guitars, keyboards, programming (2011–2013)
- Simone Bertozzi – bass (2011–2013)
- Brian Larsen – drums (2011–2013)

=== Touring members ===
- Tony Jelencovich – vocals (2005–2006)
- Victor-Ray Salomonsen Ronander – guitars (2009–2010), bass (2025)

== Discography ==
=== Studio albums ===
| Year | Title | Label |
|---|---|---|
| 2003 | Mechanical Spin Phenomena | Nuclear Blast |
| 2004 | The Audio Injected Soul | Nuclear Blast |
| 2007 | Passenger | Nuclear Blast |
| 2010 | Sons of the System | Nuclear Blast |
| 2012 | Mnemesis | Nuclear Blast |

=== Demos ===
- Demo 2000
- Demo 2002

=== Singles ===
- "Ghost" (2003)
- "Liquid" (2003)
- "Deathbox" (2004)
- "Door 2.12" (2004)
- "Meaningless" (2007)
- "Meaningless / What's Left" (2007)
- "Diesel Uterus" (2010)
- "I've Been You" (2012)
