= Someone Loves You Honey =

1978 single by Charley Pride

- Promo single

Single by Charley Pride

from the album Someone Loves You Honey
- B-side: "Days of Our Lives"
- Released: January 1978
- Genre: Country
- Length: 2:10
- Label: RCA Victor
- Songwriter: Don Devaney
- Producers: Jerry Bradley, Charley Pride

Charley Pride singles chronology
"More to Me" (1977)	"Someone Loves You Honey" (1978)	"When I Stop Leaving (I'll Be Gone)" (1978)

"Someone Loves You Honey" is a song written by Don Devaney, originally released by American country music singer Johnny Rodriguez in 1974 on his fourth album, Songs About Ladies and Love. It was recorded by American country music artist Charley Pride and released in January 1978 as the second single and title track from the album of the same name. The song was Pride's 20th number one on the country chart. The single stayed at number one for two weeks and spent a total of 12 weeks on the country chart.

June Lodge recorded a version of the song in 1980, which became the best-selling single of 1982 in the Netherlands, and American singer Lutricia McNeal had a big hit with her version of "Someone Loves You Honey" in 1998.

== Charts ==
Chart (1978)	Peak position
Canada Country Tracks (RPM)	1
US Hot Country Songs (Billboard)	1

== J.C. Lodge version ==
"Someone Loves You Honey"

Single by June Lodge and Prince Mohammed

from the album Someone Loves You Honey
- Released: 1982
- Genre: Reggae; R&B
- Songwriter: Don Devaney

June Lodge singles chronology
"Someone Loves You Honey" (1982)	"More Than I Can Say" (1982)

British singer June Lodge covered "Someone Loves You Honey" in 1982, featuring Jamaican DJ Prince Mohammed. It was the first single and title track of her debut album. The song reached number one in Belgium and the Netherlands.

=== Weekly charts ===
Chart (1982)	Peak position
Belgium (Ultratop 50 Flanders)	1
Netherlands (Dutch Top 40)	1
Netherlands (Single Top 100)	1
West Germany (GfK)	25

=== Year-end charts ===
Chart (1982)	Rank
Netherlands	1

== Lutricia McNeal version ==
"Someone Loves You Honey"

Single by Lutricia McNeal

from the album My Side of Town
- Released: 14 September 1998
- Length: 3:00
- Label: CNR Music
- Songwriter: Don Devaney
- Producers: Daniel Papalexis; Rami Yacoub; Josef Larossi

Lutricia McNeal singles chronology
"Stranded" (1997)	"Someone Loves You Honey" (1998)	"The Greatest Love You'll Never Know" / "When a Child Is Born" (1998)

Music video
- "Someone Loves You Honey" on YouTube

American singer Lutricia McNeal released a version of "Someone Loves You Honey" on 14 September 1998. It served as the fifth single from her debut album, My Side of Town (1997). The song peaked within the top 10 in Hungary and the United Kingdom and within the top 20 in Austria and Norway.

=== Music video ===
The music video for "Someone Loves You Honey" was directed by Stuart Gosling. It first aired in September 1998. Gosling also directed the videos for "My Side of Town" and "Stranded".

=== Track listing ===
- Europe CD maxi (1998)
1. "Someone Loves You Honey" (radio remix) (3:00)
2. "Someone Loves You Honey" (Andre's Boogie Buster remix) (5:09)
3. "Someone Loves You Honey" (Steve Antony & 12 Stone hip hop mix) (3:54)
4. "Someone Loves You Honey" (T-Total mix) (6:24)
5. "Stranded" (unplugged) (3:34)
- UK CD maxi (1998)
1. "Someone Loves You Honey" (radio edit) (3:02)
2. "Someone Loves You Honey" (Steve Antony R&B mix) (4:10)
3. "Someone Loves You Honey" (Club Asylum remix edit) (4:05)
4. "Someone Loves You Honey" (Steve Antony & 12 Stone hip hop mix) (3:52)

=== Charts ===
==== Weekly charts ====
Chart (1998)	Peak position
Austria (Ö3 Austria Top 40)	13
Estonia (Eesti Top 20)	11
Europe (Eurochart Hot 100)	34
France (SNEP)	82
Germany (GfK)	51
Hungary (Mahasz)	8
Iceland (Íslenski Listinn Topp 40)	21
Netherlands (Dutch Top 40 Tipparade)	14
Netherlands (Single Top 100)	77
New Zealand (Recorded Music NZ)	30
Norway (VG-lista)	17
Scotland (OCC)	16
Sweden (Sverigetopplistan)	26
UK Singles (OCC)	9
UK R&B (OCC)	3

==== Year-end charts ====
Chart (1998)	Position
Europe Border Breakers (Music & Media)	19
UK Singles (OCC)	151

Chart (1999)	Rank
Europe Border Breakers (Music & Media)	56
