= Stranded (Lutricia McNeal song) =

1998 single by Lutricia McNeal

Single by Lutricia McNeal

from the album My Side of Town
- Released: May 11, 1998
- Genre: Dance; pop; R&B
- Length: 3:34
- Label: Wildstar
- Songwriters: Rami Yacoub; Daniel Papalexis; Josef Larossi
- Producers: Daniel Papalexis; Rami Yacoub; Josef Larossi

Lutricia McNeal singles chronology
"My Side of Town" (1997)	"Stranded" (1998)	"Someone Loves You Honey" (1998)

Music video
- "Stranded" on YouTube

"Stranded" is a song by American singer Lutricia McNeal, released as the third single from her debut album, My Side of Town (1997), in May 1998. The song entered the top 10 in Austria, Hungary, Ireland, Norway, Sweden, and the United Kingdom. On the Eurochart Hot 100, it peaked at number 10 in June 1998. Outside Europe, the single was a top-three hit in New Zealand and also peaked at number six on the US Billboard Dance Club Play chart. In 1999, it was reported that "Stranded" had sold two million copies.

== Critical reception ==
Larry Flick from Billboard wrote, "Led by a cool, contemporary beat, "Stranded" is one 3 1/2-minute hook that couldn't sound more inviting as a mature-sounding uptempo cut for the summer. A funked-up, bass-heavy R&B edit should ensure spins at stations that lean to crossover, while the kicking Hothead T' Edit provides a perfect entree for dance-happy outlets." Adrian Thrills from Daily Mail described it as "sassy", noting that it's "mixing the soulful swagger of Donna Summer with a flapper-girl elegance reminiscent of the Pointer Sisters". A reviewer from Sunday Mirror commented, "Smart Swede follows up "Ain't That Just the Way" with another singalong cocktail bar anthem. Nice." Paul Sexton from The Times viewed it as "another piece of swaying, summer-weight soul that commercial radio programmers can't get enough of."

== Music video ==
The accompanying music video for "Stranded" was directed by Stuart Gosling and first aired in May 1998. It shows McNeal returning to a house and reminiscing of the past while she plays a piano. In between, there are scenes of the singer appearing with other people in the now empty house. Gosling also directed the video for "My Side of Town".

== Track listings ==
- CD single, UK (1998)
1. "Stranded" (radio edit) – 3:29
2. "Stranded" (Steve Antony Hip Hop club mix) – 5:33
3. "Stranded" (C&J Remix) – 3:40
4. "Stranded" (Baffled club mix) – 6:31
5. "Stranded" (Baffled dub mix) – 6:28
- CD maxi, Europe (1998)
1. "Stranded" (original version) – 3:34
2. "Stranded" (Steve Antony R&B) – 3:59
3. "Stranded" (Baffled remix) – 6:27
4. "Stranded" (Magestic 12 Sci Funk remix) – 6:41
5. "Stranded" (Baffled dub mix) – 6:28
6. "Stranded" (extended version) – 5:10
- CD maxi, US (1999)
1. "Stranded" (radio edit) – 3:35
2. "Stranded" (Nu Soul 7-inch remix) – 3:55
3. "Stranded" (Hothead 7-inch edit) – 3:25
4. "Stranded" (Calle & Mauro's Freestyle radio mix) – 3:13
5. "Stranded" (Hothead extended remix) – 8:27
6. "Stranded" (E-Smoove's Late Night Stomp) – 7:14

== Charts ==
=== Weekly charts ===
Weekly chart performance for "Stranded"
Chart (1998–1999)	Peak position
Austria (Ö3 Austria Top 40)	4
Belgium (Ultratip Bubbling Under Flanders)	7
Belgium (Ultratip Wallonia)	3
Denmark (IFPI)	11
Estonia (Eesti Top 20)	5
Europe (Eurochart Hot 100)	10
France (SNEP)	29
Germany (GfK)	33
Hungary (Mahasz)	8
Iceland (Íslenski Listinn Topp 40)	21
Ireland (IRMA)	10
Netherlands (Dutch Top 40 Tipparade)	12
Netherlands (Single Top 100)	67
New Zealand (Recorded Music NZ)	3
Norway (VG-lista)	4
Scotland Singles (OCC)	13
Sweden (Sverigetopplistan)	6
Switzerland (Schweizer Hitparade)	14
UK Singles (OCC)	3
UK Hip Hop/R&B (OCC)	3
US Dance Club Play (Billboard)	6

=== Year-end charts ===
Year-end chart performance for "Stranded"
Chart (1998)	Position
Europe (Eurochart Hot 100)	68
Europe Border Breakers (Music & Media)	3
New Zealand (RIANZ)	40
Sweden (Hitlistan)	40
UK Singles (OCC)	60

== Certifications ==
Certifications and sales for "Stranded"
Region	Certification	Certified units/sales
New Zealand (RMNZ)	Gold	5,000^{*}
Norway (IFPI Norway)	Gold	
Sweden (GLF)	Platinum	30,000^{^}
United Kingdom (BPI)	Silver	200,000^{^}
^{*} Sales figures based on certification alone.^{^} Shipments figures based on certification alone.

== Release history ==
Release dates and formats for "Stranded"
Region	Date	Format(s)	Label(s)	Ref.
United Kingdom	May 11, 1998	CD; cassette	Wildstar	
Japan	September 9, 1998	CD	Crave; Sony	
United States	April 6, 1999	Rhythmic contemporary; contemporary hit radio	Epic	
