= George Nooks =

Jamaican reggae singer

- Also known as: Prince Mohamed
- Born: c. 1958; Kingston, Jamaica
- Genres: Reggae; Conscious Roots Reggae; lovers rock; gospel; Dub
- Occupations: Singer, songwriter
- Years active: 1974–present
- Labels: Joe Gibbs, VP, Ariola, Jet Star, Total

George Nooks, a.k.a. Prince Mohamed, Prince Mohammed, or George Knooks (born c. 1958) is a Jamaican reggae singer who initially found fame as a deejay.

== Biography ==
Nooks started his musical career in the youth choir at his church, and moved on to perform at school concerts and talent shows. After first recording professionally in 1974, Nooks first found success performing under the name Prince Mohamed, as a deejay on discomix tracks for producer Joe Gibbs, notably on Dennis Brown's 1978 hit "Money in my Pocket", and "How Could I Leave", as well as "Light Up Your Spliff" for producer Prince Tony Robinson, founder of the Groovemaster roots record label, which also featured popular releases by Barrington Spence and Big Youth. He moved on to work with other producers such as Alvin Ranglin and Bunny Riley. His first album, a joint effort with General Echo, People Are You Ready, was released on the United Artists subsidiary Ballistic in 1978.

Nooks also guested on Augustus Pablo's Rockers All Stars album, Dub With The Help Of His Majesty : released on Everton Da Silva's Hungry Town label, Jah No Partial in particular, is a rarity amongst the spiritual roots reggae sound system fraternity. Nooks also guested on Horace Andy's Give up the Land discomix on Hungry Town label. He also featured on Leonard Dillon and The Ethiopians Buck Me Toe released on Alvin Ranglin's GG Records

This was followed by African Roots, recorded the following year for producer Linval Thompson. He had a hit in Jamaica with "Forty Legs Dread", which was a toast on Zion Gate written by Culture (band) and Joseph Hill (musician) and released by Joe Gibbs (producer) and Errol Thompson (audio engineer), and the increasing violence in Kingston prompted Nooks to record a version of Little Roy's "Tribal War", now singing rather than deejaying, and released under his real name, which he followed with a cover version of Errol Dunkley's "Darling Ooh".

Nooks also recorded Lightning and Thunder for Roy Cousins Phase One record label, using the Prince Mohamed title. These releases have been reissued by reggae-revive label Motion Records. He also toasted on the Winston Riley and Pat Kelly (musician) Techniques label discomix of I'm in the Mood for Love.

Nooks would subsequently concentrate on his singing, releasing the Today album in 1981, although he reverted to Prince Mohamed in 1982 for an album with June Lodge. His singing gained comparisons with Dennis Brown, who he would later pay tribute to with a double album of Brown covers.

His 1996 single "Real Man" reached number 55 on the Billboard R&B Singles Sales chart. In 1997 Nooks released his first album in 15 years, a self-titled collection resulting in three Tamika Reggae Music awards, but since 1997 he has been quite prolific, releasing a string of solo albums, as well as albums shared with Glen Washington, Roland Burrell, Singing Melody and Lukie D. Since the death of his grandmother in 2001, Nooks has primarily recorded Gospel music material.

His 2016 album Ride Out Your Storm reached number 4 on the Billboard Reggae Albums chart, and number 22 on the Gospel chart.

Nooks also works as a producer, and has run his own Total Records label since the early 1990s.

In 2022 he won the ABGMA Collaboration-Duo of the Year Award together with Dingy Danejah

== Albums ==
=== Prince Mohamed ===
- People Are You Ready (1978) Ballistic (with General Echo)
- African Roots (1979) Burning Rockers
- No One Remember Africa (1979) GG's
- Bubbling Techniques
- Inna Him Head (1980) Joe Gibbs
- Someone Loves You Honey (1982) Joe Gibbs/Ariola (June Lodge featuring Prince Mohamed)

=== George Nooks ===
- Today (1981) Jimpy's
- One of a Kind (1990), Mr. Doo
- George Nooks (1997) Correct
- This One's For You (1999) VP
- Standing By (2001) VP
- Damage (2001) Charm
- Toe 2 Toe vol. 2 (2002) Jet Star (George Nooks & Glen Washington)
- Better Days (2002) Jet Star
- Created by the Father (2002) Cactus (with Roland Burrell)
- No Power on Earth (2002) Jet Star
- Singers (2003) Brick Wall (Singing Melody, Lukie D, and George Nooks)
- Don't Give Up (2004) Jet Star
- Jet Star Reggae Max (2004) Jet Star
- One 2 One Volume 2 (2004) High Power Music, VP Records, (with Gregory Isaacs)
- Giving Thanks (2005)
- George Nooks Sings Dennis Brown: The Voice Lives On (2006)
- Come a Long Way (2006) Cousins
- So Excited (2007) Tafari
- Diamond Series (2008) Tad's/Total
- Broken Vessel (2012), Tad's International
- Ride Out Your Storm (2016), Tad's International
- For You (2018), VP

== DVDs ==
- God is Standing By (2005) Jet Star (with Sanchez)

=== Charted songs ===
List of charted songs, showing year released, chart positions and album name
| Title | Year | Peak chart position | Album |
| Title | Year | JAM Air. | Album |
|---|---|---|---|
| "Little Green Apples" | 2025 | 7 | Celebrating Jamaica 63 |
