= Thank You for the Demon =

Thank You For the Demon

Studio album by Mustasch
- Released: January 2014
- Recorded: Leon Music, Karlstad.
- Genre: Heavy metal
- Length: 35:44
- Label: Gain Music Entertainment/Sony Music

Mustasch chronology
Sounds Like Hell, Looks Like Heaven (2012)	Thank You For the Demon (2014)	Testosterone (2015)

Thank You For the Demon is the eighth studio album by Swedish heavy metal band Mustasch. The album, released in January 2014, peaked at No. 5 on the Swedish albums chart.

== Track listing ==
No.	Title	Writer(s)	Length
1.	"Feared and Hated"	Ralf Gyllenhammar	2:47
2.	"Thank You for the Demon"	Gyllenhammar	3:41
3.	"From Euphoria to Dystopia"	Gyllenhammar	3:36
4.	"The Mauler"	Gyllenhammar	5:03
5.	"Borderline"	Gyllenhammar	3:37
6.	"All My Life"	David Johannesson, Gyllenhammar	6:58
7.	"Lowlife Highlights"	Johannesson	2:56
8.	"I Hate to Dance"	Gyllenhammar	3:34
9.	"Don't Want to be Who I Am"	Johannesson, Gyllenhammar	3:32
Total length:			35:44
