= Passenger (Mnemic album) =

Studio album by Mnemic
- Released: 19 January 2007 (EU); 9 February 2007 (US); 21 February 2007 (Japan)
- Genres: Industrial metal, metalcore, cyber metal, thrash metal
- Length: 52:04
- Label: Nuclear Blast

Mnemic chronology
| The Audio Injected Soul (2004) | Passenger (2007) | Sons of the System (2010) |

Singles from Passenger
- 1. "Meaningless" Released: 19 December 2006

Professional ratings
Review scores
| Source | Rating |
|---|---|
| AllMusic | 4/5 stars |
| Blabbermouth.net | 7.5/10 stars |
| Chronicles of Chaos | 6.5/10 stars |
| PopMatters | 7/10 stars |

Passenger is the third album by Danish industrial metal band Mnemic, and their first to feature vocalist Guillaume Bideau (formerly of Scarve).

Originally, mixing duties were to be handled by Andy Sneap, but the band later decided to have Tue Madsen (producer and mixer on both previous albums) mix instead. Christian Olde Wolbers from Fear Factory also did co-production work for this album. Since this album, the guitarists use downtuned 7-string guitars.

To promote the album, the band went on a tour of North America in January and February 2007 with God Forbid, Goatwhore, Arsis, The Human Abstract, and Byzantine and on a tour of the UK with the Deftones in March.

== Track listing ==
| No. | Title | Length |
|---|---|---|
| 1. | "Humanaut" | 1:52 |
| 2. | "In the Nothingness Black" | 5:02 |
| 3. | "Meaningless" | 3:43 |
| 4. | "Psykorgasm" (feat. Jeff Walker and Shane Embury) | 4:13 |
| 5. | "Pigfuck" | 4:26 |
| 6. | "In Control" | 3:51 |
| 7. | "Electric I'd Hypocrisy" | 3:52 |
| 8. | "Stuck Here" | 4:41 |
| 9. | "What's Left" | 4:10 |
| 10. | "Shape of the Formless" | 4:07 |
| 11. | "The Eye on Your Back" | 7:30 |

Japanese edition bonus track
| No. | Title | Length |
|---|---|---|
| 12. | "Zero Synchronized" | 4:37 |

== Personnel ==
- Guillaume Bideau – vocals
- Mircea Gabriel Eftemie – guitar, keyboards
- Rune Stigart – guitar, keyboards
- Tomas Koefoed – bass
- Brian Rasmussen – drums

=== Additional personnel ===
- Jeff Walker – vocals on "Psykorgasm"
- Shane Embury – vocals on "Psykorgasm"
- Roy Z – guitars on "Meaningless"
