= Mechanical Spin Phenomena =

Studio album by Mnemic
- Released: 23 September 2003
- Recorded: March 2003
- Genre: Industrial metal; groove metal; nu metal; melodic death metal
- Length: 54:26
- Label: Nuclear Blast
- Producer: Tue Madsen

Mnemic chronology
Mechanical Spin Phenomena (2003)	The Audio Injected Soul (2004)

Singles from Mechanical Spin Phenomena
- 1. "Ghost" Released: 15 August 2003; 2. "Liquid" Released: 6 December 2003

Mechanical Spin Phenomena is the debut studio album by the Danish industrial metal band Mnemic, released in 2003.

== Critical reception ==
Professional ratings
Review scores
Source	Rating
AllMusic	3/5 stars
Blabbermouth	9.5/10 stars
Metal.de	8/10 stars
Rock Hard	7.5/10 stars

Laura Taylor of Exclaim! said that the album "has an aesthetic of accessibility (perhaps on the Fear Factory side) that may turn off some purists but gives the band a decent potential for reaching out to the masses."

Chris Clayton of Blabbermouth said that their debut "fully embraces every angle of aggressive music and, in an overpoweringly meticulous fashion, slots them all together seamlessly" and "could never quite be accused of being a one-dimensional recording."

== Track listing ==
No.	Title	Length
1.	"Liquid"	4:41
2.	"Blood Stained"	6:19
3.	"Ghost"	5:34
4.	"DB'XX'D"	7:59
5.	"Tattoos"	6:36
6.	"The Naked and the Dead"	5:34
7.	"Closed Eyes"	4:48
8.	"Mechanical Spin Phenomenon"	4:58
9.	"Zero Gravity"	7:51
10.	"Blood Stained (Rhys Fulber's Euphoric Recall Mix)"	7:17

== Personnel ==
- Michael Bøgballe – vocals
- Mircea Gabriel Eftemie – guitar, keyboards
- Rune Stigart – guitar, keyboards
- Mikkel Larsen – bass guitar
- Brian Rasmussen – drums
