= Mnemesis =

Studio album by Mnemic
- Released: 8 June 2012
- Recorded: 2012
- Studios: Antfarm Studios in Aabyhøj, Denmark
- Genres: Industrial metal; metalcore; heavy metal; alternative metal
- Length: 43:21
- Label: Nuclear Blast
- Producer: Tue Madsen

Mnemic chronology
| Sons of the System (2010) | Mnemesis (2012) |

Singles from Mnemesis
- 1. "I've Been You" Released: 3 May 2012

Professional ratings
Review scores
| Source | Rating |
|---|---|
| PopMatters | 7/10 stars |

Mnemesis is the fifth and final studio album by Danish metal band Mnemic. It is the only album to date to feature members Simone Bertozzi, Victor-Ray Salomonsen, and Brian Larsen and the last album to feature their lead singer at the time Guillaume Bideau who had died in 2022 due to as yet unknown reasons.

== History ==
In April 2011, longtime bass player Tomas "Obeast" Koefoed announced his departure from the band, stating that his ambitions weren't fulfilled with the band. Later that year, original members drummer Brian "Brylle" Rasmussen and guitarist Rune Stigart also left the group. In October, former members were officially replaced, respectively, by Italian bassist Simone Bertozzi and Danish Tour members drummer Brian Larsen, and guitarist Victor-Ray Salomonsen.

In March 2012, Mnemic announced that their new album would be called Mnemesis, and would be produced by producer Tue Madsen. The artwork for the album was created by Metastazis. In April, the band announced the track list and that the album was set to release on June 8. In May, Mnemic toured Europe, alongside Raunchy, to promote Mnemesis.

On 3 May 2012, the band released the first single from the album called "I've Been You" on SoundCloud.

In the first week Mnemesis sold 800 copies in the United States only, landing at position No. 38 on the Heatseekers Album chart.

On 18 September 2012, a music video for the single "I've Been You" was released.

== Track listing ==
All music written by Mnemic.

| No. | Title | Lyrics | Length |
|---|---|---|---|
| 1. | "Transcend" | Mircea Gabriel Eftemie | 4:06 |
| 2. | "Valves" | Eftemie; Guillaume Bideau | 4:04 |
| 3. | "Junkies on the Storm" | Eftemie | 3:41 |
| 4. | "I've Been You" | Bideau | 4:10 |
| 5. | "Pattern Platform" | Bideau | 3:48 |
| 6. | "Mnemesis" | Eftemie; Bideau | 4:40 |
| 7. | "There's No Tomorrow" | Bideau | 5:57 |
| 8. | "Haven at the End of the World" | Eftemie; Bideau | 3:46 |
| 9. | "Ocean of Void" | Eftemie; Bideau | 3:48 |
| 10. | "Blue Desert in a Black Hole" | Eftemie | 5:21 |
| Total length: | | | 43:21 |

US edition bonus track
| No. | Title | Writer(s) | Length |
|---|---|---|---|
| 11. | "A Matter of Choice" | Victor-Ray Salomonsen; Bideau | 3:54 |

European edition bonus track
| No. | Title | Writer(s) | Length |
|---|---|---|---|
| 11. | "Empty Planet" | Salomonsen; Bideau | 4:44 |

Japanese edition bonus track
| No. | Title | Writer(s) | Length |
|---|---|---|---|
| 11. | "Empty Planet" | Salomonsen; Bideau | 4:44 |
| 12. | "A Matter of Choice" | Salomonsen; Bideau | 3:54 |

iTunes edition bonus track
| No. | Title | Writer(s) | Length |
|---|---|---|---|
| 11. | "Synaesthesia" | Salomonsen; Brian Larsen | 3:25 |

== Personnel ==
- Guillaume Bideau – vocals
- Mircea Gabriel Eftemie – guitar
- Victor-Ray Salomonsen – guitar, keyboards, programming, lead guitar on "There's No Tomorrow" and "Empty Planet"
- Simone Bertozzi – bass
- Brian Larsen – drums

Production

- Tue Madsen – producer, guitar solo on "A Matter of Choice"
- Metastazis – artwork
