= The Audio Injected Soul =

Studio album by Mnemic
- Released: 5 October 2004
- Recorded: May–June 2004
- Genre: Industrial metal; groove metal; nu metal
- Length: 45:26
- Label: Nuclear Blast
- Producer: Tue Madsen

Mnemic chronology
Mechanical Spin Phenomena (2003)	The Audio Injected Soul (2004)	Passenger (2007)

Singles from The Audio Injected Soul
- 1. "Deathbox" Released: 25 August 2004; 2. "Door 2.12" Released: 18 November 2004

Professional ratings
Review scores
Source	Rating
AllMusic	3.5/5 stars
Rock Hard	8.5/10 stars
Metal.de	8/10 stars
BloodChamber	9/10 stars

The Audio Injected Soul is the second album by Danish metal band Mnemic. It has gone on to sell almost 35,000 copies in North America.

This is the last album to feature Michael Bøgballe on vocals, as he left the band exactly one year after the album's release.

== Track listing ==
No.	Title	Length
1.	"The Audio Injection"	0:43
2.	"Dreamstate Emergency"	5:18
3.	"Door 2.12"	4:22
4.	"Illuminate"	5:03
5.	"Deathbox"	4:31
6.	"Sane Vs. Normal"	2:46
7.	"Jack Vegas"	3:24
8.	"Mindsaver"	4:12
9.	"Overdose in the Hall of Fame"	5:16
10.	"The Silver Drop"	4:52
11.	"Wild Boys" (Duran Duran cover)	4:59

== AM3D technology ==
The tracks "The Audio Injection" and "Deathbox" are the only two tracks from the album to include the AM3D technology. The back and in the inlay of the album states: "The AM3D positional headphone technology presents a way of improving the sound experience. Using binaural techniques, the sound is processed to localize a single sound to a specific location in three-dimensional space around the listener." The German edition of the album does not include the AM3D technology, resulting in the introduction ("The Audio Injection") being removed, and the track "Deathbox" being edited.

== Personnel ==
- Michael Bøgballe – vocals
- Mircea Gabriel Eftemie – guitar, keyboards
- Rune Stigart – guitar, keyboards
- Tomas Koefoed – bass
- Brian Rasmussen – drums
