= My Side of Town =

Studio album by Lutricia McNeal
- Released: 27 October 1997
- Length: 37:01
- Label: CNR
- Producers: Per Adebratt; Daniel Bäckström; Tommy Ekman; Josef Larossi; Daniel Papalexis; Rob'n'Raz; Andreas Romdhane; Rami Yacoub

Lutricia McNeal chronology
My Side of Town (1997)	Whatcha Been Doing (1999)

Singles from My Side of Town
- 1. "Ain't That Just the Way" Released: 1997; 2. "My Side of Town" Released: 1997; 3. "Washington" Released: 1997; 4. "Stranded" Released: 1998; 5. "Someone Loves You Honey" Released: 1998; 6. "The Greatest Love You'll Never Know / When a Child Is Born" Released: 1998

UK cover
- UK release

US cover
- US release

My Side of Town is the debut album by Lutricia McNeal, originally released in 1997 by CNR Music Sweden. The album was released with the title Lutricia McNeal in the UK by Wildstar Records. It includes the singles "Ain't That Just the Way" and "Stranded", which were big hits mainly in Europe, and "My Side of Town", which reached number one in New Zealand.

== Critical reception ==
Professional ratings
Review scores
Source	Rating
AllMusic	4.5/5 stars
Daily Mail	3/5 stars
The Guardian	3/5 stars
The Times	6/10 stars

AllMusic editor Jaime Sunao Ikeda rated the US edition of album four and a half stars out of five. He found that the singles on the album indicated "why she has been so successful so far: because of the talent she possesses and the ace production of her support."

== Track listing ==
=== Original release ===
My Side of Town track listing
No.	Title	Writer(s)	Producer(s)	Length
1.	"My Side of Town"	Lutricia McNeal; Jay G.; Daniel Bäckström; Daniel Papalexis; Rami Yacoub; Josef Larossi	Bäckström; Papalexis; Yacoub; Larossi	3:14
2.	"Always"	McNeal; Jay G.; Bäckström; Papalexis; Yacoub; Larossi	Bäckström; Papalexis; Yacoub; Larossi	3:39
3.	"Ain't That Just the Way"	Bruce Belland; Glen Larson; Stu Phillips	Bäckström; Papalexis; Yacoub; Larossi	3:33
4.	"Wannabe"	McNeal; Jay G.; Bäckström; Papalexis; Yacoub; Larossi	Bäckström; Papalexis; Yacoub; Larossi	3:13
5.	"Washington"	McNeal; Jay G.; Bäckström; Papalexis; Yacoub; Larossi	Bäckström; Papalexis; Yacoub; Larossi	3:40
6.	"Do's Me Good"	McNeal; Jay G.; Bäckström; Papalexis; Yacoub; Larossi	Bäckström; Papalexis; Yacoub; Larossi	3:37
7.	"Badlands" (featuring Swing)	McNeal; Richard Silva II; Jay G.; Bäckström; Papalexis; Yacoub; Larossi	Bäckström; Papalexis; Yacoub; Larossi	4:00
8.	"Closer"	McNeal; Jay G.; Bäckström; Papalexis; Yacoub; Larossi	Bäckström; Papalexis; Yacoub; Larossi; Sham Zhamry Yusof^{[a]}	3:23
9.	"Way in the Water"	McNeal; Jay G.; Bäckström; Papalexis; Yacoub; Larossi	Bäckström; Papalexis; Yacoub; Larossi	5:06
10.	"Crossroads"	McNeal; Jay G.; Bäckström; Papalexis; Yacoub; Larossi	Bäckström; Papalexis; Yacoub; Larossi	2:00
11.	"The Heart Is a Lonely Hunter"	McNeal; Jay G.; Bäckström; Papalexis; Yacoub; Larossi	Bäckström; Papalexis; Yacoub; Larossi	1:56

=== UK release ===
Lutricia McNeal track listing
No.	Title	Writer(s)	Producer(s)	Length
1.	"Ain't That Just the Way"	Belland; Larson; Phillips	Bäckström; Papalexis; Yacoub; Larossi	3:33
2.	"Always"	McNeal; Jay G.; Bäckström; Papalexis; Yacoub; Larossi	Bäckström; Papalexis; Yacoub; Larossi	3:39
3.	"Stranded"	Papalexis; Yacoub; Larossi	Papalexis; Yacoub; Larossi	3:33
4.	"Whatever Makes You Happy"	Tommy Ekman; Larossi; James "St. James" Gicho	Per Adebratt; Ekman	3:38
5.	"My Side of Town"	McNeal; Jay G.; Bäckström; Papalexis; Yacoub; Larossi	Bäckström; Papalexis; Yacoub; Larossi	3:14
6.	"The Greatest Love You'll Never Know"	Peter Zizzo; Nicky Holland	Papalexis; Yacoub; Larossi	4:21
7.	"Someone Loves You Honey"	Don Devaney	Papalexis; Yacoub; Larossi	3:24
8.	"Washington"	McNeal; Jay G.; Bäckström; Papalexis; Yacoub; Larossi	Bäckström; Papalexis; Yacoub; Larossi	3:35
9.	"Life Is Funny"	McNeal; Jay G.; Robert Wåtz; Rasmus Lindwall	Rob'n'Raz	3:40
10.	"Badlands" (featuring Swing)	McNeal; Silva; Jay G.; Bäckström; Papalexis; Yacoub; Larossi	Bäckström; Papalexis; Yacoub; Larossi	4:00
11.	"Crossroads"	McNeal; Jay G.; Bäckström; Papalexis; Yacoub; Larossi	Bäckström; Papalexis; Yacoub; Larossi	2:00
12.	"The Heart Is a Lonely Hunter"	McNeal; Jay G.; Bäckström; Papalexis; Yacoub; Larossi	Bäckström; Papalexis; Yacoub; Larossi	1:56
13.	"Ain't That Just the Way" (Steve Antony R&B edit)	Belland; Larson; Phillips	Bäckström; Papalexis; Yacoub; Larossi; Steve Antony^{[b]}	4:02
14.	"Stranded" (Steve Antony R&B edit)	Papalexis; Yacoub; Larossi	Papalexis; Yacoub; Larossi; Antony^{[b]}	3:59

=== UK re-release ===
Lutricia McNeal reissue track listing
No.	Title	Writer(s)	Producer(s)	Length
1.	"Stranded"	Papalexis; Yacoub; Larossi	Bäckström; Papalexis; Yacoub; Larossi	3:33
2.	"Ain't That Just the Way"	Belland; Larson; Phillips	Bäckström; Papalexis; Yacoub; Larossi	3:33
3.	"The Greatest Love You'll Never Know"	Zizzo; Holland	Papalexis; Yacoub; Larossi	4:21
4.	"Always"	McNeal; Jay G.; Bäckström; Papalexis; Yacoub; Larossi	Bäckström; Papalexis; Yacoub; Larossi	3:39
5.	"Whatever Makes You Happy"	Ekman; Larossi; Gicho	Adebratt; Ekman	3:38
6.	"Someone Loves You Honey"	Devaney	Papalexis; Yacoub; Larossi	3:24
7.	"My Side of Town"	McNeal; Jay G.; Bäckström; Papalexis; Yacoub; Larossi	Bäckström; Papalexis; Yacoub; Larossi	3:14
8.	"Washington"	McNeal; Jay G.; Bäckström; Papalexis; Yacoub; Larossi	Bäckström; Papalexis; Yacoub; Larossi	3:35
9.	"When a Child Is Born"	Ciro Dammicco; Dario Baldan Bembo; Francesco Specchia; Maurizio Seymandi; Alberto Salerno; Fred Jay; Michael Holm	Andreas Romdhane	3:29
10.	"Life Is Funny"	McNeal; Jay G.; Robert Wåtz; Rasmus Lindwall	Rob'n'Raz	3:40
11.	"Badlands" (featuring Swing)	McNeal; Silva; Jay G.; Bäckström; Papalexis; Yacoub; Larossi	Bäckström; Papalexis; Yacoub; Larossi	4:00
12.	"Crossroads"	McNeal; Jay G.; Bäckström; Papalexis; Yacoub; Larossi	Bäckström; Papalexis; Yacoub; Larossi	2:00
13.	"The Heart Is a Lonely Hunter"	McNeal; Jay G.; Bäckström; Papalexis; Yacoub; Larossi	Bäckström; Papalexis; Yacoub; Larossi	1:56

=== US release ===
Ain't That Just The Way
No.	Title	Writer(s)	Producer(s)	Length
1.	"Ain't That Just the Way"	Belland; Larson; Phillips	Bäckström; Papalexis; Yacoub; Larossi	3:35
2.	"Always"	McNeal; Jay G.; Bäckström; Papalexis; Yacoub; Larossi	Bäckström; Papalexis; Yacoub; Larossi	3:40
3.	"Stranded"	Papalexis; Yacoub; Larossi	Bäckström; Papalexis; Yacoub; Larossi	3:33
4.	"Whatever Makes You Happy"	Ekman; Larossi; Gicho	Adebratt; Ekman	3:38
5.	"My Side of Town"	McNeal; Jay G.; Bäckström; Papalexis; Yacoub; Larossi	Bäckström; Papalexis; Yacoub; Larossi	3:14
6.	"The Greatest Love You'll Never Know"	Zizzo; Holland	Papalexis; Yacoub; Larossi	4:21
7.	"Someone Loves You Honey"	Devaney	Papalexis; Yacoub; Larossi	3:24
8.	"Washington"	McNeal; Jay G.; Bäckström; Papalexis; Yacoub; Larossi	Bäckström; Papalexis; Yacoub; Larossi	3:35
9.	"Life Is Funny"	McNeal; Jay G.; Robert Wåtz; Rasmus Lindwall	Rob'n'Raz	3:40
10.	"Badlands" (featuring Swing)	McNeal; Silva; Jay G.; Bäckström; Papalexis; Yacoub; Larossi	Bäckström; Papalexis; Yacoub; Larossi	4:01
11.	"Crossroads"	McNeal; Jay G.; Bäckström; Papalexis; Yacoub; Larossi	Bäckström; Papalexis; Yacoub; Larossi	3:27
12.	"Ain't That Just the Way" (Steve Antony R&B edit)	Belland; Larson; Phillips	Bäckström; Papalexis; Yacoub; Larossi; Antony^{[b]}	4:02
13.	"Stranded" (Steve Antony R&B edit)	Papalexis; Yacoub; Larossi	Papalexis; Yacoub; Larossi; Antony^{[b]}	3:59

Notes

- ^{^[a]} denotes co-producer(s)
- ^{^[b]} denotes additional producer(s)

== Charts ==
Chart performance for My Side of Town
Chart (1997)	Peak position
Austrian Albums (Ö3 Austria)	22
Dutch Albums (Album Top 100)	51
German Albums (Offizielle Top 100)	37
Norwegian Albums (VG-lista)	8
Scottish Albums (Official Charts)	44
Swedish Albums (Sverigetopplistan)	20
Swiss Albums (Schweizer Hitparade)	19
UK Albums (Official Charts)	16
UK R&B Albums (Official Charts)	4
