= J.C. Lodge =

- Born: June Carol Lodge; 1 December 1958 (age 67); London, England
- Origin: Jamaica
- Genres: Reggae
- Occupations: Singer, songwriter, fine artist, teacher
- Instrument: Vocals
- Years active: 1980–present
- Labels: Ariola; RAS; Greensleeves; VP; Tommy Boy; Warner Bros. Records; Ariwa; Mercury; IDJMG; Universal Records
- Website: jclodge.net

J.C. Lodge (born June Carol Lodge, 1 December 1958) is a British-Jamaican reggae singer, fine artist and teacher. Her breakthrough hit "Someone Loves You, Honey" became the best-selling single of 1982 in the Netherlands. Lodge is also an accomplished painter, having exhibited in Kingston art galleries, and has acted in several theatre productions.

== Music career ==
British born to a black Jamaican father and white British mother, J.C. Lodge was taken to Jamaica as a child. There, the Beatles fan soon became immersed in R&B and reggae, and sang along to everything she heard.

Toward the end of high school, a relationship with Errol O'Meally led her further along her music path. He was a budding songwriter, and used her voice to present some of his material to Joe Gibbs' Recording Studio. Both the songs and the singer were well received, and Lodge was asked to record Charley Pride's hit "Someone Loves You, Honey" in 1980. The reggae version of the country and western tune topped the Jamaican chart, and earned the singer gold and platinum discs in the Netherlands, where it became the No. 1 top-selling single of 1982. Though the record was a big hit, it bankrupted Gibbs as she had failed to pay royalties to the songwriter. An album of the same name, featuring Prince Mohamed as deejay, was released in 1982.

Lodge followed this with 1985's Revealed album, before signing to Gussie Clarke's Music Works label, and releasing I Believe in You and Selfish Lover albums. "Telephone Love", recorded for Clarke in 1988, was the first dancehall reggae track to cross over in the R&B and hip-hop markets in the United States, topping the urban charts in New York City and other cities, and earning her a deal with the Warner Bros.-owned Tommy Boy label, although the association would be limited to the Tropic of Love album and "Home is Where the Hurt Is" single, which gave her her highest US chart placing, reaching number 45 in the R&B chart.

Lodge's albums mostly consisted of reggae, but some with R&B and pop material, too, usually written by O’Meally or Lodge. Producers like O'Meally, Gibbs, Willie Lindo, Gussie Clarke, and Neil Fraser (a.k.a. Mad Professor) created a product that garnered for Lodge several hits and prestigious awards across the world.

Lodge's other songs also include "More Than I Can Say" and "Make It Up". She sang a duet with Tiger on "Love Me, Baby" and with Shabba Ranks on "Telephone Love".

In 2001, she returned to her native England and recorded Reggae Country for Jet Star, an album of covers of American country songs. She studied for a teaching degree and combined work as a schoolteacher with her music career.

== Sing 'n' Learn ==
J.C. Lodge has been inspired since the birth of her daughter in 1994, to write original children's songs. She released two cassette albums called "Sing 'n' Learn". Ranging from simple counting and spelling for the littlest ones to manners and environmental awareness for pre-teens, Lodge created a variety of rhythms and styles to appeal to children everywhere. These cassettes were so well received in Jamaica that the Ministry of Education ordered a copy for every Basic School on the island.

In 2000, Lodge was invited by Jamaican National Broadcasting Association TVJ to produce a 13-part children's television series, based on the cassette albums. A critically acclaimed and popular success, the show got awarded by the Press Association of Jamaica and also the Caribbean Broadcasting Union.

== Discography ==
=== Albums ===
- Someone Loves You Honey (1982) (Netherlands No. 5) Ariola/BMG Records
- Revealed (1985) RAS
- I Believe in You (1987) Greensleeves
- Selfish Lover (1990) VP
- Home is Where The Hurt Is (1991)
- Tropic of Love (1992) Tommy Boy/Warner Bros. Records
- To the Max (1993) RAS/Sanctuary
- Special Request (1995) RAS/Sanctuary
- Love for All Seasons (1996) Ariwa
- RAS Portraits: J.C. Lodge (1997) RAS/Sanctuary (compilation)
- Let Love Inside (2001) Mercury/IDJMG/Universal Records
- Reggae Country (2002) Jet Star
- Reggae Country 2 (2003) Jet Star
- This Is Crucial Reggae (2004) RAS/Sanctuary (compilation)
- Storybook Revisited – Telephone Love (2021)

=== Singles (selection) ===
- "Someone Loves You Honey" (1982) (BEL No. 1 / GER No. 25 / NETH No. 1 / NETH No. 1 end of the year chart)
- "More Than I Can Say" (1982) (BEL No. 10 / GER No. 72 / NETH No. 6)
- "Don't Stop Me" (1982)
- "Kiss and Say Goodbye" (1984)
- "Give My Husband a Message" (1985)
- "Telephone Love" (1988) (US R&B No. 95) – Shabba Ranks featuring J.C. Lodge
- "Home Is Where the Hurt Is" (1991) (US R&B No. 45)
- "Come Again" (1992)
- "Love Transfusion" (2012)
- "Comfort Zone" (2013)
