= Metroplex (album) =

Studio album by Lutricia McNeal
- Released: 18 November 2002
- Length: 51:47
- Label: Bonnier
- Producer: Thomas Ahlstrand; Rickard Anderson; Fresh & Sweet; Pontus Frisk; Magnus Frykberg; Achim Jannsen; Martin Jonsson; Tony Malm; Gary Miller; Ivo Moring; Mirko von Schlieffen

Lutricia McNeal chronology
Whatcha Been Doing (1999)	Metroplex (2002)	Soulsister Ambassador (2004)

Metroplex is the third studio album by American singer Lutricia McNeal. It was first released by Bonnier Music on 18 November 2002 in Sweden.

== Background ==
Much of Metroplex was recorded in Los Angeles, London, and Sundsvall, with the bulk of the set being produced by duo Fresh & Sweet at Sidelake Studios.

== Critical reception ==
Professional ratings
Review scores
Source	Rating
laut.de	3/5 stars

laut.de editor Alexander Engelen rated Metroplex three out of five stars and described it as "danceable feelgood pop/R&B."

== Track listing ==
Metroplex track listing
No.	Title	Writer(s)	Producer(s)	Length
1.	"Perfect Love"	Mirko von Schlieffen; Terri Bjerre; Ivo Moring	Schlieffen; Achim Jannsen	3:26
2.	"Piano – Texas – USA"	Lutricia McNeal; John Reed; Tony Malm	Fresh & Sweet	3:31
3.	"You Showed Me"	Gene Clark; Jim McGuinn	Fresh & Sweet	3:25
4.	"Wrong or Right (Jason's Song)"	McNeal; Reed; Malm; Billy Lawrie	Fresh & Sweet	3:42
5.	"Poof! You're Gone"	McNeal; Reed; Fresh & Sweet	Fresh & Sweet	3:03
6.	"All That Matters"	McNeal; Reed; Fresh & Sweet	Fresh & Sweet	3:14
7.	"Power of Music"	Lawrie; Paul Barry	Gary Miller	4:00
8.	"Love Is a Drug"	Macy Gray; Joe Solo	Pontus Frisk	5:00
9.	"Independence Day"	Jeff Franzel; Michelle Lewis	Martin Jonsson	3:58
10.	"Dreadlock Refugee"	McNeal; Lawrie; Barry	Jonsson; Magnus Frykberg	3:38
11.	"Money"	McNeal; Thomas Ahlstrand; Rickard Anderson; Reed; Lawrie	Ahlstrand; Anderson	3:29
12.	"C'mon In"	McNeal; Reed; Malm	Fresh & Sweet; Malm	3:33
13.	"Satisfied"	Mikael Anderfjärd; Brian Hobbs	Fresh & Sweet	3:27
14.	"Papa Said"	McNeal; Reed; Malm	Malm	4:13

== Charts ==
Chart performance for Metroplex
Chart (2003)	Peak position
Polish Albums (ZPAV)	29

== Release history ==
Metroplex release history
Region	Date	Format(s)	Label	Ref.
Sweden	18 November 2002	CD; cassette	Bonnier Music	
Germany	30 June 2003	CD; cassette	Polydor	
