= Songs the Night Sings =

2019 studio album by the Dark Element

Studio album by the Dark Element
- Released: November 8, 2019
- Genre: Symphonic metal
- Length: 56:04
- Label: Frontiers

The Dark Element chronology
| The Dark Element (2017) | Songs the Night Sings (2019) |

Professional ratings
Review scores
| Source | Rating |
|---|---|
| Blabbermouth.net | 7.5/10 |

Songs the Night Sings is the second studio album by the Finnish symphonic metal band the Dark Element. It was released on November 8, 2019 through Frontiers Records.

== Track listing ==
All tracks are written by Jani Liimatainen.

| No. | Title | Length |
|---|---|---|
| 1. | "Not Your Monster" | 6:24 |
| 2. | "Songs the Night Sings" | 5:10 |
| 3. | "When It All Comes Down" | 5:59 |
| 4. | "Silence Between the Words" | 4:35 |
| 5. | "Pills on My Pillow" | 4:31 |
| 6. | "To Whatever End" | 5:16 |
| 7. | "The Pallbearer Walks Alone" | 5:40 |
| 8. | "Get Out of My Head" | 4:44 |
| 9. | "If I Had a Heart" | 4:47 |
| 10. | "You Will Learn" | 5:56 |
| 11. | "I Have to Go" | 3:02 |
| Total length: | | 56:04 |

== Chart positions ==
| Chart (2019) | Peak position |
|---|---|
| Finnish Albums (Suomen virallinen lista) | 31 |
| Scottish Albums (OCC) | 99 |
| Swiss Albums (Schweizer Hitparade) | 79 |
| UK Independent Albums (OCC) | 22 |
| UK Rock & Metal Albums (OCC) | 4 |
