= Mustasch (album) =

Studio album by Mustasch
- Released: 2009
- Genre: Heavy metal
- Label: Regain Records

Mustasch chronology
Latest Version of the Truth (2007)	Mustasch (2009)	The New Sound of the True Best (2011)

Mustasch is the fifth studio album by Swedish heavy metal band Mustasch. The album, released in 2009, peaked at No. 5 on the Swedish albums chart.

== Track listing ==
No.	Title	Length
1.	"Tritonus (Prelude)"	0:36
2.	"Heresy Blasphemy"	3:51
3.	"Mine"	3:38
4.	"Damn It's Dark"	3:29
5.	"The Man the Myth the Wreck"	2:42
6.	"The Audience Is Listening"	3:34
7.	"Desolate"	5:07
8.	"Deep in the Woods"	4:15
9.	"I'm Frustrated"	4:01
10.	"Lonely"	3:20
11.	"Blackout Blues"	3:40
12.	"Tritonus"	5:40

== Charts ==
=== Weekly charts ===
Chart (2009)	Peak position
Finnish Albums (Suomen virallinen lista)	35
Swedish Albums (Sverigetopplistan)	5

=== Year-end charts ===
Chart (2009)	Position
Swedish Albums (Sverigetopplistan)	91
