= Whatcha Been Doing =

Studio album by Lutricia McNeal
- Released: 18 October 1999
- Length: 38:47
- Label: Arcade

Lutricia McNeal chronology
My Side of Town (1997)	Whatcha Been Doing (1999)	Metroplex (2002)

Singles from Whatcha Been Doing
- 1. "365 Days" Released: 1999; 2. "Fly Away" Released: 2000

Whatcha Been Doing is the second studio album by American singer Lutricia McNeal.

== Track listing ==
Whatcha Been Doing track listing
No.	Title	Writer(s)	Producer(s)	Length
1.	"365 Days"	Andre Romdhane; Josef Svedlund	Romdhane; Josef Larossi	3:19
2.	"Fly Away"	Lutricia McNeal; Daniel Papalexis	Papalexis; Kadir Taysir	3:50
3.	"When The Morning Comes"	McNeal; Henrik Johansson; Rohan Heath; Papalexis	Papalexis; Taysir	3:27
4.	"Butterflies"	George Shahin; Max Bursell; Peter Bostrom; Joakim Udd; Johan Fjellstrom	Romdhane; Larossi	3:34
5.	"I Never Said I Loved You"	McNeal; Shahin; Lisa Calderon; Papalexis	Papalexis; Taysir	3:31
6.	"Everything"		Udd; Fjellstrom	3:43
7.	"Kissing You Goodbye"	Fredrik Jarnberg; Pontus Wennerberg	Romdhane; Larossi	3:44
8.	"Being With You"	McNeal; Calderon; Papalexis	Papalexis; Taysir	3:18
9.	"(Always) On My Mind"	Shahin; Papalexis; Kadir Taysir	Papalexis; Taysir	3:43
10.	"Crazy Love"	Rami Yacoub; Svedlund	Romdhane; Larossi	3:22
11.	"Whatcha Been Doing"	McNeal; Calderon	Romdhane; Larossi	3:17

== Charts ==
Chart performance for Whatcha Been Doing
Chart (1999)	Peak position
Austrian Albums (Ö3 Austria)	50
Norwegian Albums (VG-lista)	31
German Albums (Offizielle Top 100)	84
Swiss Albums (Schweizer Hitparade)	21

The opening track "365 Days" made the 1999 year-end for Music & Media's Border Breakers chart, measuring European airplay outside of each artist's country of label signing.
