= My Side of Town (Lutricia McNeal song) =

1997 single by Lutricia McNeal

Single by Lutricia McNeal

from the album My Side of Town
- Released: 1997
- Genre: Pop
- Length: 3:14 (album version); 3:07 (radio edit)
- Label: CNR Music; Do It Yourself; EastWest
- Songwriters: Lutricia McNeal; Jay G.; Daniel Bäckström; Daniel Papalexis; Rami Yacoub; Josef Larossi
- Producers: Daniel Bäckström; Daniel Papalexis; Rami Yacoub; Josef Larossi

Lutricia McNeal singles chronology
"Ain't That Just the Way" (1996)	"My Side of Town" (1997)	"Stranded" (1998)

Music video
- "My Side of Town" on YouTube

"My Side of Town" is a song by American singer Lutricia McNeal, co-written and released as the second single from her debut studio album of the same name (1997) and the follow-up to her 1996 international hit "Ain't That Just the Way". "My Side of Town" charted within the top 40 of the charts of Iceland, the Netherlands, and Sweden in 1997. In 1999, it reached number one in New Zealand.

== Critical reception ==
AllMusic editor Jaime Sunao Ikeda named "My Side of Town" one of two standout tracks from the album. Adrian Thrills from Daily Mail described it as a "impressive on up-tempo number" and "calypso-flavoured".

== Chart performance ==
"My Side of Town" did not match the chart success of "Ain't That Just the Way" in Europe, but it peaked at number 17 in the Netherlands, number 30 in Sweden, number 31 in Iceland, and number 73 in Germany. It did not chart in the United Kingdom, where "Ain't That Just the Way" peaked at number four, but her success in the UK would continue with "Stranded".

In 1998, McNeal's music began to gain popularity in New Zealand, with two hits, "Ain't That Just the Way" and "Stranded", reaching the top three; "My Side of Town" followed these hits. It first appeared on the Recorded Music NZ (then RIANZ) chart at number 43 on January 24, 1999, then reached number seven three weeks later. It dropped out of the top 10 for the next three weeks, then rose 12 places to the number-one position on March 14. "My Side of Town" spent 12 weeks on the New Zealand chart, making its last appearance at number 29 on April 11, 1999. Despite its success, this song was McNeal's last top-20 in New Zealand.

== Music video ==
Two different music videos were produced for the song. One of them was directed by Stuart Gosling. He would also be directing the video to McNeal's next single, "Stranded".

== Track listings ==
Maxi-CD single, Netherlands (1997)
No.	Title	Length
1.	"My Side of Town" (radio edit)	3:07
2.	"My Side of Town" (extended version)	4:45
3.	"My Side of Town" (EZ's extended mix)	4:01
4.	"My Side of Town" (My Side of the House mix)	4:01
5.	"My Side of Town" (original album version)	3:14

Maxi-CD single, Germany (1997)
No.	Title	Length
1.	"My Side of Town" (original version)	3:14
2.	"My Side of Town" (EZ's extended mix)	4:01
3.	"My Side of Town" (My Side of the House mix)	4:01
4.	"My Side of Town" (original extended version)	4:01
5.	"My Side of Town" (EZ's radio edit)	4:01

== Charts ==
=== Weekly charts ===
Chart (1997–1999)	Peak position
Belgium (Ultratip Bubbling Under Flanders)	6
Estonia (Eesti Top 20)	9
Germany (GfK)	73
Iceland (Íslenski Listinn Topp 40)	31
Israel (Israeli Singles Chart)	3
Netherlands (Dutch Top 40)	17
Netherlands (Single Top 100)	18
New Zealand (Recorded Music NZ)	1
Sweden (Sverigetopplistan)	30

=== Year-end charts ===
Chart (1997)	Position
Romania (Romanian Top 100)	92
