= Tornado Babies =

Swedish rock band

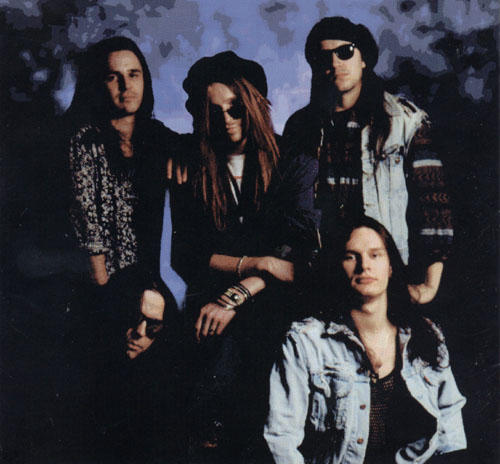
- Band photo from the 'Delerious' era. Photo by Tony Bergstrand.

Background information
- Origin: Gothenburg, Sweden; London, England
- Genres: Hard rock, glam metal
- Years active: 1987-present
- Labels: Bad N' Dangerous; Musik; Demon Doll Records
- Members: Dan "Harry Ellström; Paul "Porre" Vahala; Dan Rigtorp; Kenny Gustavsson; Bertil "Beppe" Nieminen

Tornado Babies is a Swedish rock band from Gothenburg, Sweden that was formed 1987 in London, England.

The members are Dan "Harry" Ellström (vocals), Paul "Porre" Vahala (bass), Dan Rigtorp (drums), Kenny Gustavsson (guitar) and Bertil "Beppe" Nieminen (guitar).

The group's debut album Eat This! came out in 1991, followed by the singles "Instant Fun" in 1992 and "Delirious" in 1993. Their second full-length album Delirious was released in 1993.

Demon Doll Records (US) reissued the group's first album, Eat This!, remastered and with a bonus track "Straight to Hell" in 2013. That same year the band started playing again. New songs were written and the single "Bored Beyond Belief" came out 2015.

The band's major performances in Sweden counts: Hultsfredsfestivalen 1992 (audience 22000) and as a support act to Motörhead at Globen Annexet, Stockholm in 1993.

== Discography ==
Albums

- 1991 – Eat This! (CD, Bad N Dangerous)
- 1991 – Eat This! (LP, Bad N Dangerous)
- 1993 – Delirious (CD, Musik/Musik)
- 2013 – Eat This! (CD, Demon Doll Records)
- 2019 – "Demo-lition" (CD, FnA Records)

Singles

- 1992 – "Instant Fun" (CD, Musik/Musik)
- 1992 – "Instant Fun" (7" Vinyl, Musik/Musik)
- 1993 – "Delirious" (CD, Musik/Musik)
- 2015 – "Bored Beyond Belief" (Digital)
- 2016 – "I'm Back" (Digital)

Compilation Albums

- 1995 – Garanterat Ipluggat (CD, Backstage)
- 1996 – A Salute To AC/DC (CD, Tribute Records)
- 2003 – "A Tribute to AC/DC" (CD, Moon Records/Cover Recordings)

Bootlegs

- 2000 – "Delirious" (CD)
