= Powerhouse (Mustasch album) =

Studio album by Mustasch
- Released: 1 June 2005
- Recorded: March – May 2005; Bohus Sound Recording
- Genre: Heavy metal
- Producer: Mustasch, Roberto Laghi

Mustasch chronology
Ratsafari (2003)	Powerhouse (2005)	Latest Version of the Truth (2007)

Powerhouse is the third full-length album by Swedish heavy metal band Mustasch. It was released in 2005, and peaked at number 10 on the Swedish charts.

== Track listing ==
1. "Haunted by Myself" - 4:13
2. "Accident Black Spot" - 3:33
3. "Frosty White" - 3:54
4. "Dogwash" - 3:04
5. "Turn It Down" - 2:49
6. "Life on Earth" - 5:36
7. "Powerhouse" - 3:26
8. "I Lied" - 4:23
9. "I'm Alright" - 3:28
10. "Evil Doer" - 2:58
11. "In the Deep - October" - 8:01
