= Seventh Crystal =

Swedish rock band

Seventh Crystal is a Swedish hard rock band. They have released three albums, all on Frontiers Music.

Hailing from Gothenburg, the band was conceived by vocalist Kristian Fyhr.

== Discography ==
- Delirium (2021)
- Wonderland (2023)
- Infinity (EP, 2023)
- Entity (2024)

Fyhr also founded Ginevra with Magnus Karlsson (Primal Fear), Jimmy Jay (H.E.A.T.) and Magnus Ulfstedt (Eclipse).
