= Above All (Mustasch album) =

Studio album by Mustasch
- Released: 2002
- Genre: Heavy metal

Mustasch chronology
Above All (2002)	Ratsafari (2003)

Above All is the first full-length album by Swedish heavy metal band Mustasch. The album which was released in 2002, peaked at No. 22 on the Swedish albums charts.

== Track listing ==
1. "Down in Black" – 2:45
2. "I Hunt Alone" – 3:17
3. "Into the Arena" – 5:13
4. "Muddy Waters" – 3:29
5. "Ocean Song – Orust" – 5:47
6. "Sympathy for Destruction" – 3:14
7. "Teenage Pacifier" – 4:08
8. "Insanity Walls" – 4:36
9. "White Magic" – 4:22
10. "The Dagger" – 5:14
