= Lutricia McNeal =

American singer

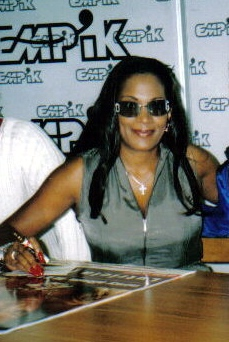

Background information
- Born: November 27, 1973 (age 52); Oklahoma City, Oklahoma, U.S.
- Genres: Pop, soul, dance
- Occupation: Musician
- Years active: 1996–present
- Labels: Arcade Records (1996–2000); Bonnier Amigo / Polydor (2002–2004); Edel (2004–2005); Playground Music (2005–2006); Exzess Berlin (2007) tspmusic (2011–)

Lutricia McNeal (born November 27, 1973) is an American soul and pop singer. She achieved worldwide success with her cover version of "Ain't That Just the Way" which sold two million copies worldwide.

== Biography ==
McNeal was discovered by Rogers/Grantham. Her career took off during a visit to Europe, when she teamed up with the Swedish producer team Rob'n'Raz. Their 1993 hit "In Command" went to No. 1 in Sweden.

A few years later she started her own solo career with the single "Ain't That Just the Way". The single went gold and platinum in several countries.

She then released her debut album My Side of Town. The biggest airplay hits from this album were "Stranded" and "Someone Loves You Honey". Her single "My Side of Town" went platinum and was a #1 hit in New Zealand. She managed to have three Top 10 hit singles in the UK. A second album followed in 1999 entitled Whatcha Been Doing before she took a short break from the music business to give birth to her second son.

In 2006, she produced songs like "Hold That Moment" and "Same Same Same", but "Same Same Same" was never officially released. In October 2004 she posed for the German version of Playboy. She expressed her disapproval for George W. Bush and his policies (especially regarding the Iraq War) clearly in interviews and is involved in women's rights. She then released the singles "It's Not Easy" (in September 2005), which was released in Sweden only and reached #3 on the Single Charts, and "Best Of Times" (in February 2006) which reached No 6 on the Swedish Single Charts. "You Make Me Feel Good" was released in Germany, Austria and Switzerland in July 2011.

== Discography ==
=== Studio albums ===
| Title | Album details | Peak positions | | | | | | |
| Title | Album details | AUT | GER | NOR | POL | SWE | SWI | UK |
|---|---|---|---|---|---|---|---|---|
| My Side of Town | Released: 1997; Formats: CD, cassette | 22 | 37 | 8 | — | 20 | 19 | 16 |
| Whatcha Been Doing | Released: 1999; Formats: CD, cassette | 50 | 84 | 31 | — | — | 21 | — |
| Metroplex | Released: 2002; Formats: CD, cassette | — | — | — | 29 | — | — | — |
| Soulsister Ambassador | Released: 2004; Formats: CD, digital download | — | — | — | — | — | — | — |
"—" denotes a recording that did not chart or was not released in that territory.

=== Compilation albums ===
- Greatest Hits (2004)
- Complete Best (2010)

=== Singles ===
List of singles, with selected chart positions
| Title | Year | Peak chart positions | | | | | | | | | Certifications (sales thresholds) | Album |
| Title | Year | UK | SWE | GER | AUT | NOR | FIN | SWI | NZ | POL | Certifications (sales thresholds) | Album |
|---|---|---|---|---|---|---|---|---|---|---|---|---|
| "Ain't That Just the Way" | 1997 | 6 | 1 | 5 | 2 | — | 15 | 3 | 2 | — | UK: Silver | My Side of Town |
| "My Side of Town" | 1997 | — | 30 | 73 | — | — | — | — | 1 | — | NZ: Platinum | My Side of Town |
| "Washington" | 1997 | — | — | — | — | — | — | — | — | — | | My Side of Town |
| "Stranded" | 1998 | 3 | 6 | 33 | 4 | 4 | — | 14 | 3 | — | NZ: Platinum; UK: Silver | My Side of Town |
| "Someone Loves You Honey" | 1998 | 9 | 26 | 51 | 13 | 17 | — | — | 30 | — | | My Side of Town |
| "The Greatest Love You'll Never Know" / "When a Child Is Born" | 1998 | 17 | 36 | — | — | — | — | — | — | — | | My Side of Town |
| "365 Days" | 1999 | — | 18 | 58 | 26 | 14 | — | 31 | 39 | — | | Whatcha Been Doing |
| "Fly Away" | 2000 | — | 14 | 84 | — | — | 7 | 61 | — | — | | Whatcha Been Doing |
| "Sodapop" | 2000 | — | 54 | — | — | — | — | — | — | — | | Non-album song |
| "Perfect Love" | 2002 | — | 8 | 41 | 22 | 13 | 20 | 93 | — | 14 | | Metroplex |
| "You Showed Me" | 2002 | — | — | — | — | — | — | — | — | 7 | | Metroplex |
| "Power of Music" | 2003 | — | — | — | — | — | — | — | — | — | | Metroplex |
| "Wrong or Right" | 2003 | — | — | — | 50 | — | — | — | — | 14 | | Metroplex |
| "Promise Me" | 2004 | — | — | 86 | — | — | — | — | — | — | | Soulsister Ambassador |
| "Rise" | 2005 | — | — | — | — | — | — | — | — | — | | Rise (EP) |
| "It's Not Easy" | 2005 | — | 3 | — | — | — | — | — | — | — | | Non-album song |
| "Best of Times" | 2005 | — | 6 | — | — | — | — | — | — | — | | Non-album song |
| "Hold That Moment" | 2007 | — | — | — | — | — | — | — | — | — | | Non-album song |
| "You Make Me Feel Good" | 2011 | — | — | — | — | — | — | — | — | — | | Non-album song |
| "Ain't That Just The Way" (with Charming Horses) | 2020 | — | — | — | — | — | — | — | — | 70 | | Non-album song |
"—" denotes releases that did not chart in that country or territory, otherwise the song was not released in this country.
