= Mustasch =

Swedish rock band

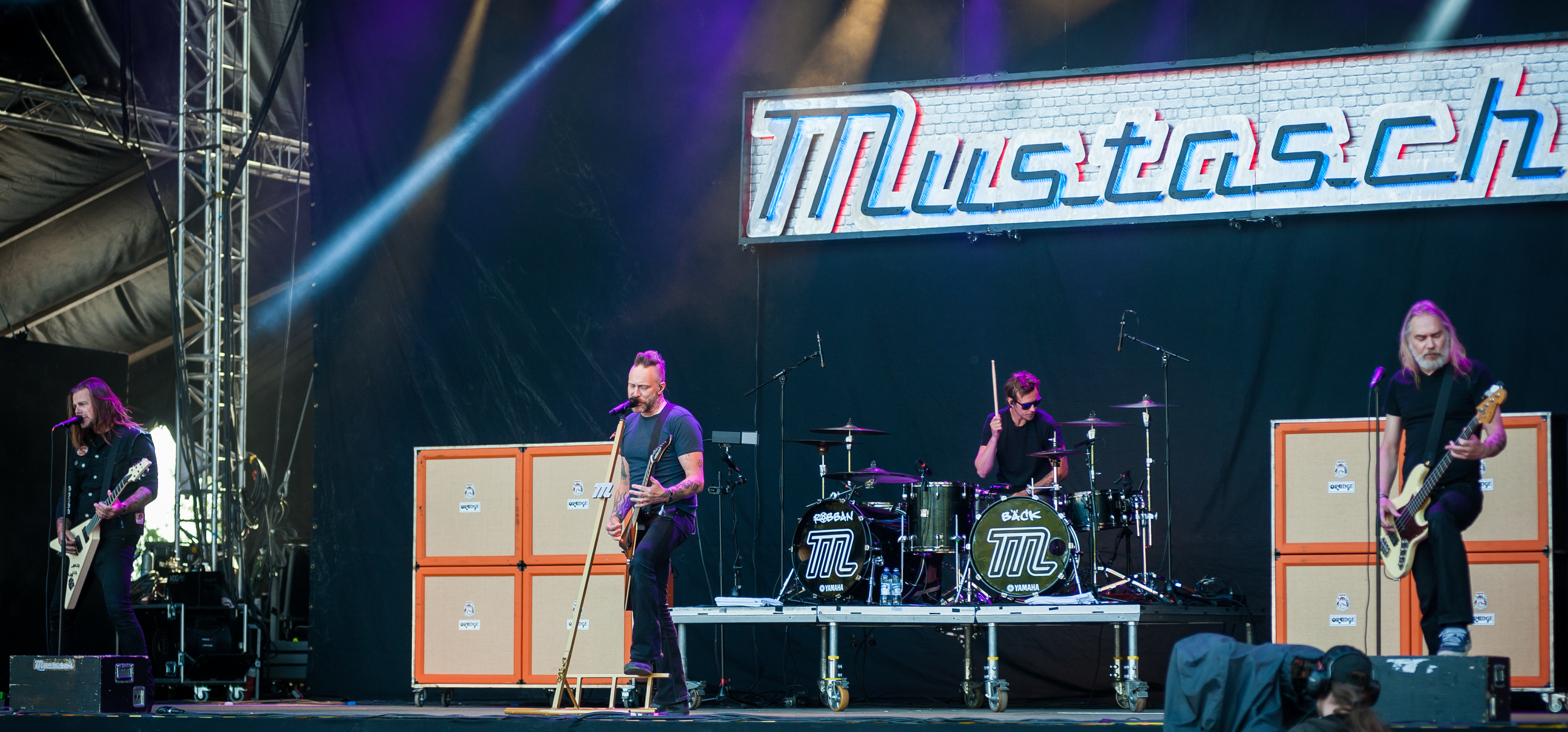
- Mustasch performing in 2018

Background information
- Origin: Gothenburg, Sweden
- Genres: Stoner rock, heavy metal, hard rock
- Years active: 1998–present
- Labels: Regain, EMI, Nuclear Blast
- Members: Ralf Gyllenhammar; Niklas Matsson; Markus Harrysson; Johan Wendt
- Past members: Hannes Hansson; Mats Hansson; Danne McKenzie; Jejo Perković; Stam Johansson; David Johannesson; Robban Bäck; Pontus Snibb; Martin Ekelund
- Website: www.mustasch.org

Mustasch is a Swedish rock band. They were formed in the fall of 1998 by Ralf Gyllenhammar, Hannes Hansson, Mats Hansson and Stam Johansson in Gothenburg.

== History ==
Mustasch was formed in Gothenburg in 1998, and recorded demos at "The Mustasch Farm" on the island Orust which were released through different record labels around the world in small numbers. In 2001 they released their first EP The True Sound of the New West, embarked on a tour, and started to make a name for themselves in the Swedish metal scene. They chose the name Mustasch because many of their musical heroes had moustaches; such as Freddie Mercury from Queen and Tony Iommi from Black Sabbath.

The band went on to release Above All in 2002 and Ratsafari in 2003, both of which were nominated for Swedish Grammies and helped the band to build their reputation. The band continued to tour hard, and released Powerhouse in 2005 before switching record labels. The switch to Regain Records was made to get the proper channels to sell metal records and the fact that the label was based near Gothenburg.

With their new record label, they were given complete creative control and in 2006 they released an EP entitled Parasite! It was soon followed up with their 2007 album, Latest Version of the Truth, which led to their first Swedish Grammy award after being nominated twice in the past. Following the album's release, the band postponed further recordings, instead favoring an extensive touring schedule to promote themselves; this also led to the release of the compilation album Lowlife Highlights.

In June 2008, guitarist Hannes Hansson announced that he would leave the band due to family reasons: "It's been a fantastic period of ten years with the band, but now the band has grown so much with touring all over the world. It takes too much from my family and other things in life which I now want to put all my priority to."

The band continued their scheduled tour with various replacements before David Johannesson from Swedish metal band Sparzanza was chosen as a permanent replacement.

In late-spring 2009, Mustasch started to work on their new album, also announcing that drummer Mats 'Dojan' Hansson had left the band because of arthritis; Danne McKenzie, who had played with the band on numerous occasions, took the spot. In August 2009, the band announced that they had finished recording their new album, entitled Mustasch, and that it will be released on 30 September in Finland and Sweden, 5 October in Denmark and Norway, and the rest of the world in early 2010. The first single from the album is entitled "Mine".

In November 2011, the band made the song "The Challenger", which became a hit. It made a breakthrough in all of Scandinavia, and will go global with their new world-tour.

On 22 December 2015, Mustasch announced Robban Bäck would become a full-time member.

They participated in Melodifestivalen 2021 with the song "Contagious", which failed to qualify from the semi-finals.

On 4 February 2023, David, Stam, and Robban decided to leave the band "in order to pursue other career opportunities". It was later confirmed that current Bonafide members Pontus Snibb, Martin Ekelund and Niklas Matsson would join the band as replacements.

== Mustasch and Mind.se ==
In August 2019, Mustasch teamed up with Mental Illness Charity (Mind.se) to highlight issues of suicide rates among young men. They launched a campaign to help tackle this issue. Talking about their new single "What Is Wrong" (which is also the name of the campaign), singer Ralf Gyllenhammar said, "'What Is Wrong' is our fight song for young men suffering from mental illness. Men are expected to be strong and dare not seek help. We want to change that in Mustache [sic]. That's why we are now starting the #whatiswrong campaign. Our goal is to raise SEK 200,000. That amount allows Mind's volunteers to receive 600 calls from support applicants in the Suicide Line. It is conversation that saves lives."

== Band members ==
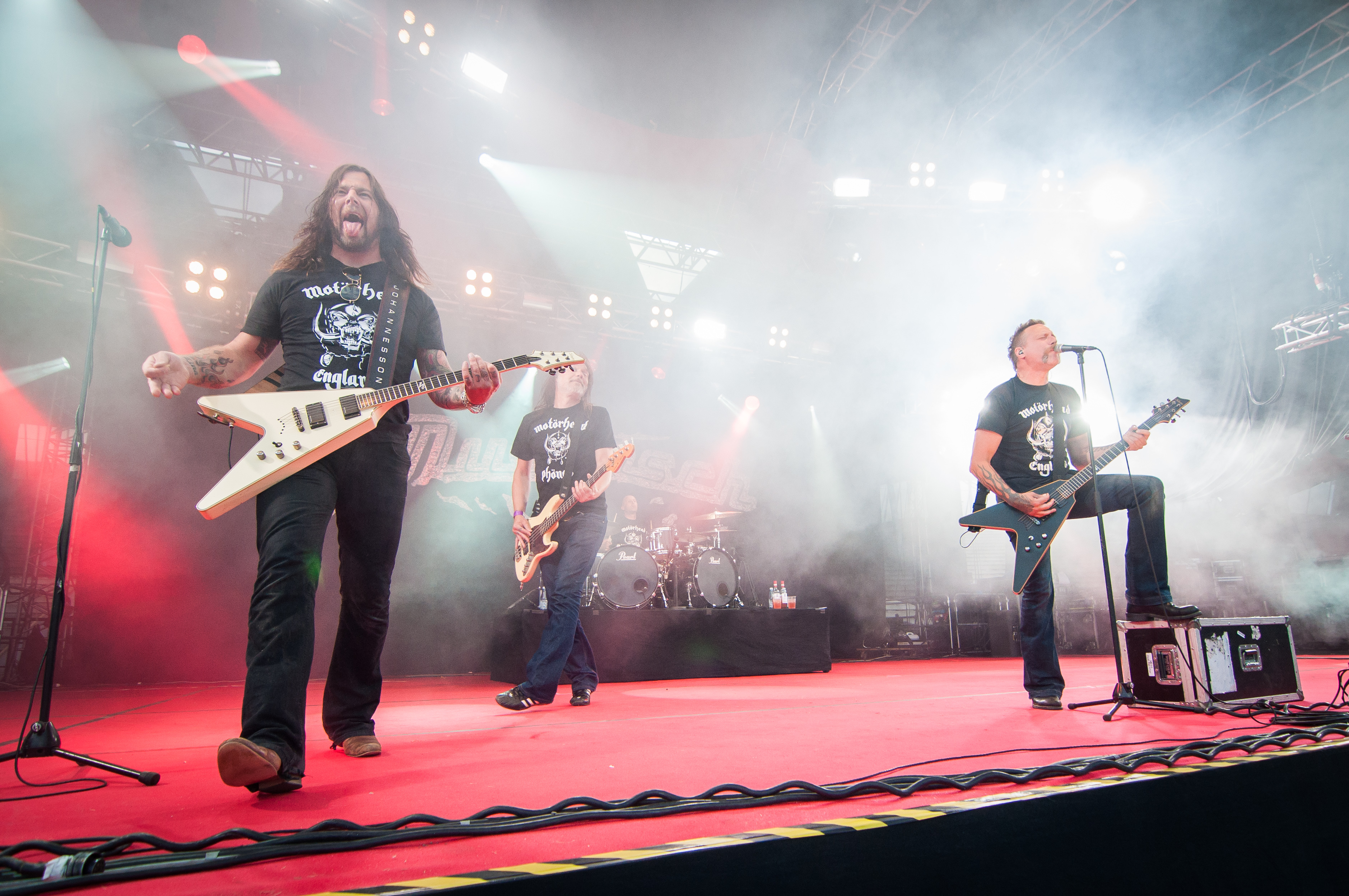
Mustasch in 2013

Current members

- Ralf Gyllenhammar – vocals, rhythm guitar (1998–present)
- Niklas Matsson – drums (2024–present)
- Markus Harrysson – lead guitar (2024–present)
- Johan Wendt – bass (2024–present)

Former members

- Hannes Hansson – lead guitar (1998–2008)
- Mats Hansson – drums (1998–2009; died 2022)
- Mats Johansson – bass (1998–2023)
- Danne Mckenzie – drums (2009–2012)
- Jejo Perković – drums (2012–2015)
- David Johannesson – lead guitar (2008–2023)
- Robban Bäck – drums (2015–2023)

Touring members

- Kristian Laimaa – rhythm guitar (2008)
- Martin Boman – rhythm guitar (2008)
- Leif Larsson – bass (2008)
- Danne McKenzie – drums (2008)
- Pontus Snibb – lead guitar (2023)
- Martin Ekelund – bass (2023)

Timeline

== Discography ==
=== Albums ===
Studio albums

Year	Album	Peak positions		Certification
Year	Album	SWE	FIN	Certification
2002	Above All	22	–	
2003	Ratsafari	20	–	
2005	Powerhouse	10	–	
2007	Latest Version of the Truth	3	–	
2009	Mustasch	5	35	
2011	The New Sound of the True Best (old tracks re-recorded)	2	17	
2012	Sounds Like Hell, Looks Like Heaven	4	6	
2014	Thank You for the Demon	5	4	
2015	Testosterone	10	17	
2018	Silent Killer	4	9	
2019	Killing It for Life	38	–	

EPs

Year	Album	Peak positions		Certification
Year	Album	SWE	FIN	Certification
2001	The True Sound of the New West	–	–	
2006	Parasite!	22	–	
2021	A Final Warning – Chapter One	21	35	

Live recordings

- 2008 In the Night (DVD)

Compilation albums

Year	Album	Peak positions		Certification
Year	Album	SWE	FIN	Certification
2008	Lowlife Highlights	22	–	
2009	Singles A's & B's	–	–	

=== Singles ===
Year	Single	Peak positions	Album
Year	Single	SWE	Album
2002	"I Hunt Alone"	57	Above All
2002	"Down in Black"	–	Above All
2003	"Black City"	52	Ratsafari
2004	"6:36"	–	Ratsafari
2005	"Dogwash"	–	Powerhouse
2005	"I'm Alright"	–	Powerhouse
2007	"Double Nature"	2	Latest Version of the Truth
2007	"Bring Me Everyone"	25	Latest Version of the Truth
2008	"Spreading the Worst"	–	Latest Version of the Truth
2009	"Mine"	9	Mustasch
2012	"The Challenger"	–	Sounds Like Hell, Looks Like Heaven
2013	"Feared and Hated"	–	Thank You for the Demon
2016	"Midnight Runner"	–	Non-album track
2017	"Änglahund"	91	Non-album track
2017	"Hound from Hell"	–	Non-album track
2017	"Lawbreaker"	–	Silent Killer
2018	"Fire"	–	Silent Killer
2018	"Winners"	–	Silent Killer
2021	"Contagious"	– (Note: "Contagious" did not enter the Swedish Singellista Chart, but peaked at number three on the Swedish Heatseeker Chart.)	A Final Warning – Chapter One

=== Demos and other appearances ===
- 1999: Daredevil Magazine / Burn the Streets Vol. 1
- 1999: Molten Universe – Volume One
- 2000: Underdogma – Judge Not ...
- 2000: Daredevil Magazine / Burned Down to Zero
- 2002: All Areas Volume 29
- 2003: All Areas Volume 44
- 2002: The Encyclopedia of Swedish Hard Rock and Heavy Metal, Volume II
- 2003: Music Plato Mania Sampler Volume 1
- 2003: Off Road Tracks Vol. 65
- 2003: P3 Popstad 2003 Växjö
- 2007: Target Roskilde 07
