= Ratsafari =

Studio album by Mustasch
- Released: 2003
- Genre: Heavy metal
- Producer: Jacob Hellner

Mustasch chronology
Above All (2002)	Ratsafari (2003)	Powerhouse (2005)

Ratsafari is the second full-length album by Swedish heavy metal band Mustasch. It was released in 2003.

== Track listing ==
1. "Stinger Citizen" - 3:12
2. "Black City" - 2:35
3. "Unsafe at Any Speed" - 4:34
4. "Ratsafari" - 4:21
5. "6:36" - 4:45
6. "Deadringer" - 3:20
7. "Fredrika" - 4:59
8. "Alpha Male" - 3:39
9. "Mareld" - 1:29
10. "Lone Song (Reclusion)" - 4:26
11. "Monday Warrior" - 4:53
