= Glen Washington =

Jamaican reggae singer-songwriter, drummer and record producer(born 17 July 1957)

- Washington in 2009

Background information
- Born: Glenroy Washington; 17 July 1957 (age 69); Clarendon, Jamaica
- Genres: Reggae, soca
- Occupations: Singer-songwriter, drummer, record producer
- Instrument: Vocals
- Years active: 1976–present
- Label: Independent
- Website: www.realglenwashington.com

Glenroy Washington (born 17 July 1957) is a Jamaican reggae/soca singer-songwriter, drummer and record producer. Washington made his first hit record "Rockers Not Crackers" in 1978 for the Joe Gibbs Record label; but he did not grace the charts again until the release of the hit "Kindness For Weakness" in 1998.

== Discography ==
=== Albums ===
- Brother To Brother (1996), Studio One
- Get Next To Me (1998), VP Records/Joe Frasier
- Think About It (1999), Digital Eclipse Records
- Can't You See (1999), Charm Records
- Solitary Red Rose (1999), Ruff Stuff Records (as Glenn Washington)
- Wandering Stranger (2000), Studio One
- Number One Girl (2000), VP Records
- Can't Keep A Good Man Down (2001), Don One Sounds
- Free Up The Vibes (2001), VP Records
- Your Love (2002), VP Records
- Wanna Be Loved (2004), VP Records
- The Right Road, (2004), Jet Star Records
- Heart of the City (2006), Don One Sounds
- Destiny (2008), VP Records
- Glen Washington Meets Jah Ruby (2009), Jah Ruby Records/VP Records
- Masterpiece (2012), Zion High Productions
- Vibes (2013), Cou$ins Records
- Time of My Life (2017), Love Injection Productions
- I'm Livin Well (2020), Heavy Beat Records
- Mr Washington (2022), Love Injection Productions
- Jah Children (2023), Zion High Productions
- Just Giving Thanks (2025), Tad's Record

=== Charted singles ===
List of charted singles, showing year released, chart positions and album name
Title	Year	Peak chart position	Album
Title	Year	JAM Air.	Album
"Better Than Before"	2025	8	Just Giving Thanks
