= Ain't That Just the Way =

1975 single by Barbi Benton

Single by Barbi Benton
- A-side: "The Reverend Bob"
- Released: 1975
- Length: 2:55
- Label: Playboy
- Songwriters: Bruce Belland; Glen Larson; Stu Phillips
- Producer: Stu Phillips

Barbi Benton singles chronology
"Roll You Like a Wheel" (1975)	"Ain't That Just the Way" (1975)	"Staying Power" (1976)

"Ain't That Just the Way" (sometimes spelled as "Ain't That Just the Way (That Life Goes Down)") is a song written by Bruce Belland, Glen Larson and Stu Phillips. American model, actress and singer Barbi Benton originally recorded it for release as the B-side of her 1975 single "The Reverend Bob". It became a major hit in Scandinavia, especially in Sweden, topping the Swedish singles chart for 10 weeks in 1977. It also topped the charts in Finland. In 1978, it appeared on her album with the same name, released only in Scandinavia. The song was performed in the McCloud TV series. In 1996, Lutricia McNeal's cover of "Ain't That Just the Way" became a hit in Europe and New Zealand.

== Charts ==
Weekly chart performance for "Ain't That Just the Way"
Chart (1976–1977)	Peak position
Finland	1
Norway (VG-lista)	2
Sweden (Sverigetopplistan)	1

== Lutricia McNeal version ==
"Ain't That Just the Way"

Single by Lutricia McNeal

from the album My Side of Town
- Released: November 1996
- Genre: Hip hop; urban soul
- Length: 3:11
- Label: Bluehill; EastWest; XM
- Songwriters: Bruce Belland; Glen Larson; Stu Phillips
- Producers: Daniel Bäckström; Daniel Papalexis; Josef Svedlund; Rami Yacoub

Lutricia McNeal singles chronology
"Ain't That Just the Way" (1996)	"My Side of Town" (1997)

Music video
- "Ain't That Just the Way" on YouTube

American singer Lutricia McNeal released her version of "Ain't That Just the Way" as her debut single in November 1996. It was produced by Daniel Bäckström, Daniel Papalexis, Josef Svedlund and Rami Yacoub, and included on her debut album, My Side of Town, in 1997. The song became a hit in Europe, topping the Swedish Singles Chart on the week of November 15, 1996, and reaching the top five in Austria, Germany, the Netherlands, and Switzerland. It also found success in New Zealand, peaking at number two for four weeks and becoming McNeal's highest-charting single in the country until 1999, when "My Side of Town" reached number one. The accompanying music video was directed by Swedish director Patric Ullaeus.

In 2020, McNeal re-recorded her vocals for "Ain't That Just the Way", which were used in a new version of this song, recorded by German DJ Charming Horses and released on March 13, 2020.

=== Background and release ===
Lutricia McNeal first came to notice as the lead singer of Swedish dance act Rob'n'Raz—their 1993-hit "In Command" reached number one in Sweden. In 1995, their manager, Jonas Siljemark, convinced McNeal to try some solo recordings for his own Siljemark label. She recorded a cover of "Ain't That Just the Way" and released it as a single in Europe in November 1996. Her version topped the Swedish Singles Chart for a week later the same month. McNeal won the Best Newcomer award for the song at the 1997 Swedish Dance Awards.

Following its Swedish success, "Ain't That Just the Way" was picked up by Dutch radio programmers early in 1997. It sold 55,000 units there, then the record broke into neighboring Germany. Later, it gained popularity in Austria, Belgium, and Switzerland. In November 1997, "Ain't That Just the Way" debuted and peaked at number six on the UK Singles Chart, and in April 1998, it reached number two on the New Zealand Singles Chart for four consecutive weeks.

=== Critical reception ===
Larry Flick from Billboard magazine wrote that McNeal "earns high marks on her first single if only for not falling into the trap of mimicking Mary J. Blige or Brandy like nearly every other jeep-soul diva in waiting. Instead, she aims to forge her own original path, belting with little attitude and absolutely no affectation. The result is a wonderfully charming, instantly infectious recording that leaves you hankering for more. For trend followers, the groove chugs at a spirited hip hop pace, blossoming into a full-bodied pop sing-along at the chorus. It's anyone's guess which format will climb aboard first—and it hardly matters since this smacks with across-the-board appeal." Adrian Thrills from Daily Mail viewed it as "sassy", adding that the singer is "mixing the soulful swagger of Donna Summer with a flapper-girl elegance reminiscent of the Pointer Sisters".

Dave Sholin from the San Francisco-based Gavin Report commented that American-born McNeal "had to travel over-seas to follow her star, but based on this debut single, that star is about to follow her home. Originally from Oklahoma City, she wound up in Sweden where she fell in love, got married, and also hit the top of the charts. That success has since spread to Germany, Austria, and Switzerland. This song is next set to hit the streets in the U.S.A. and the UK. It's easy to get caught up in the flow of this cool entry." Pan-European magazine Music & Media noted that the singer's cover "features an urban soul sound which is finding favour in playlist meetings at CHR, rock and dance stations alike."

=== Music video ===
The music video for "Ain't That Just the Way" was directed by Swedish director and photographer Patric Ullaeus. It beares a heavy resemblance to a 1996 music video for "If Your Girl Only Knew" by American singer Aaliyah, directed by Joseph Kahn.

=== Legacy ===
In 2014, the Official UK Chart named McNeal's version of "Ain't That Just the Way" a "pop gem". Justin Myers wrote, "We've all let that special someone slip through our fingers are one time or another, and few songs talk about that "if only" feeling as well as this track." In 2017, Dave Fawbert from ShortList complimented it as a "great little tune", reviewing songs that were released 20 years ago today.

=== Track listings ===
- Sweden CD single (1996)
1. "Ain't That Just the Way" (original version) (3:34)
2. "Ain't That Just the Way" (extended version) (4:28)
- Sweden CD single (The Remixes) (1996)
1. "Ain't That Just the Way" (radio edit) (3:22)
2. "Ain't That Just the Way" (Hurb's Mix) (4:53)
3. "Ain't That Just the Way" (extended version) (4:27)
4. "Ain't That Just the Way" (EZ's vinyl version) (4:21)
5. "Ain't That Just the Way" (Stripped extended version) (3:54)
6. "Ain't That Just the Way" (original version) (3:34)
- UK and Ireland: CD maxi (1997)
1. "Ain't That Just the Way" (original mix) (3:11)
2. "Ain't That Just the Way" (Steve Antony R&B edit) (4:03)
3. "Ain't That Just the Way" (Steve Antony Rok Dat Club Mix) (5:15)
4. "Ain't That Just the Way" (Baby Bud Mix) (3:33)
5. "Ain't That Just the Way" (In Da City Mix) (6:43)
6. "Ain't That Just the Way" (Steve Antony R&B Mix) (5:31)

=== Charts ===
==== Weekly charts ====
Weekly chart performance for "Ain't That Just the Way"
Chart (1996–1998)	Peak position
Austria (Ö3 Austria Top 40)	2
Belgium (Ultratop 50 Flanders)	29
Croatia International (HRT)	4
Estonia (Eesti Top 20)	9
Europe (Eurochart Hot 100)	10
Finland (Suomen virallinen lista)	15
France (SNEP)	50
France Airplay (SNEP)	23
Germany (GfK)	5
Hungary (Mahasz)	10
Iceland (Íslenski Listinn Topp 40)	8
Ireland (IRMA)	16
Israel (Israeli Singles Chart)	9
Netherlands (Dutch Top 40)	2
Netherlands (Single Top 100)	2
New Zealand (Recorded Music NZ)	2
Scottish Singles Sales (Official Charts)	25
Sweden (Sverigetopplistan)	1
Sweden (Swedish Dance Chart)	5
Switzerland (Schweizer Hitparade)	3
UK Singles (Official Charts)	6
UK Hip Hop/R&B (Official Charts)	2
US Billboard Hot 100	63
US Rhythmic Top 40 (Billboard)	29

==== Year-end charts ====
1996 year-end chart performance for "Ain't That Just the Way"
Chart (1996)	Position
Sweden (Topplistan)	17
Sweden (Swedish Dance Chart)	21

1997 year-end chart performance for "Ain't That Just the Way"
Chart (1997)	Position
Austria (Ö3 Austria Top 40)	22
Europe (Eurochart Hot 100)	42
Germany (Media Control)	27
Iceland (Íslenski Listinn Topp 40)	61
Netherlands (Dutch Top 40)	29
Netherlands (Single Top 100)	27
Switzerland (Schweizer Hitparade)	50
UK Singles (OCC)	59

1998 year-end chart performance for "Ain't That Just the Way"
Chart (1998)	Position
Europe Border Breakers (Music & Media)	41
New Zealand (RIANZ)	15
UK Singles (OCC)	144

2020 year-end chart performance for "Ain't That Just the Way"
Chart (2020)	Position
Poland (ZPAV) with Charming Horses	70

=== Certifications ===
Certifications and sales for "Ain't That Just the Way"
Region	Certification	Certified units/sales
Austria (IFPI Austria)	Gold	25,000^{*}
Germany (BVMI)	Gold	250,000^{^}
Netherlands (NVPI)	Gold	50,000^{^}
New Zealand (RMNZ)	Platinum	10,000^{*}
United Kingdom (BPI)	Silver	200,000^{^}
^{*} Sales figures based on certification alone.^{^} Shipments figures based on certification alone.

=== Release history ===
Release dates and formats for "Ain't That Just the Way"
Region	Date	Format(s)	Label(s)	Ref.
Europe	November 1996	CD	Bluehill; EastWest; XM	
Austria	March 26, 1997	CD	CNR Music	
Benelux	March 26, 1997	CD	CNR Music	
France	March 26, 1997	CD	CNR Music	
Germany	March 26, 1997	CD	CNR Music	
Switzerland	March 26, 1997	CD	CNR Music	
United States	November 11, 1997	Rhythmic contemporary; contemporary hit radio	Crave; CNR Music	
Japan	April 22, 1998	CD	Sony	

== Other versions ==
- In 2007 Anna Book recorded the song on the album Samba Sambero.
- Ingela "Pling" Forsman wrote lyrics in Swedish, "Är det inte så", and in that language it was recorded by Wizex on the 1977 album Som en sång and by Friends on the 2002 album Dance with Me
