= Latest Version of the Truth =

Studio album by Mustasch
- Released: 2007
- Genre: Heavy metal
- Length: 48:56
- Label: Regain

Mustasch chronology
Powerhouse (2005)	Latest Version of the Truth (2007)	Mustasch (2009)

Latest Version of the Truth is the fourth full-length album by Swedish heavy metal band Mustasch. It was released in 2007.

== Track listing ==
1. "In the Night" - 4:22
2. "Double Nature" - 4:45
3. "Falling Down" - 3:56
4. "The Heckler" - 3:31
5. "I Wanna Be Loved" - 5:44
6. "Scyphozoa" - 2:11
7. "Spreading the Worst" - 3:17
8. "Bring Me Everyone" - 3:57
9. "Forever Begins Today" - 4:18
10. "I Am Not Aggressive" - 3:26
11. "The End" - 9:26
12. "Once a Liar" (Japanese edition bonus track)

== Charts ==
=== Weekly charts ===
Chart (2007)	Peak position
Swedish Albums (Sverigetopplistan)	3

=== Year-end charts ===
Chart (2007)	Position
Swedish Albums (Sverigetopplistan)	71
