= Sons of the System =

Studio album by Mnemic
- Released: 15 January 2010
- Recorded: September–October 2009
- Studios: Antfarm facility (Aarhus, Denmark)
- Genres: Industrial metal, groove metal, alternative metal
- Length: 52:50
- Label: Nuclear Blast
- Producer: Tue Madsen

Mnemic chronology
Passenger (2007)	Sons of the System (2010)	Mnemesis (2012)

Singles from Sons of the System
- 1. "Diesel Uterus" Released: 8 January 2010

Professional ratings
Review scores
Source	Rating
AllMusic	4/5 stars
PopMatters	7/10 stars

Sons of the System is the fourth album by Danish metal band Mnemic, released in Europe on 18 January 2010 and in North America on 26 January 2010. This would be Mnemic's last album with members Rune Stigart, Tomas "Obeast" Koefoed and Brian Rasmussen, before they left the band in 2011.

The album was recorded in the band's own studio with producer Tue Madsen, who worked with the band on previous releases Mechanical Spin Phenomena and The Audio Injected Soul. The band describes the album as "Very eclectic, very diverse, and nothing that you would imagine coming from a band like us. Let's just say it has become more theatrical, more electronic, and just more catchy, as we have put all our focus on writing good songs and not being afraid of experimenting."

Sons of the System sold roughly 600 copies in the United States after its first week of release.

== Track listing ==
All music is composed by Mircea Gabriel Eftemie, Rune Stigert, Brian Rasmussen, Tomas Koefoed and Guillaume Bideau.

No.	Title	Lyrics	Length
1.	"Sons of the System"	Bideau/Eftemie	5:35
2.	"Diesel Uterus"	Eftemie	4:31
3.	"Mnightmare"	Bideau	4:55
4.	"The Erasing"	Bideau	4:07
5.	"Climbing Towards Stars"	Eftemie	4:41
6.	"March of the Tripods"	Bideau/Eftemie	6:53
7.	"Fate"	Bideau	3:35
8.	"Hero(in)"	Bideau	5:15
9.	"Elongated Sporadic Bursts"	Eftemie	3:51
10.	"Within"	Bideau	4:45
11.	"Orbiting"	Eftemie	4:42

=== Bonus tracks ===
European version and digipak

No.	Title	Lyrics	Length
12.	"Dreamjunkie"		4:22
13.	"Orbiting" (LÆTHERSTRIP Remix)	Eftemie	4:48

United States

No.	Title	Lyrics	Length
12.	"Dreamjunkie"		4:22
13.	"Sons of the System" (LÆTHERSTRIP Remix)	Bideau/Eftemie	4:00

Japanese

No.	Title	Lyrics	Length
12.	"Dreamjunkie"		4:22
13.	"Orbiting" (LÆTHERSTRIP Remix)	Eftemie	4:48
14.	"Aalborg City"		3:58

iTunes-exclusive (in addition to regional bonus tracks)

No.	Title	Length
14.	"Judgement Journey"	5:40

== Credits ==
- Guillaume Bideau – vocals
- Mircea Gabriel Eftemie – guitar, keyboards
- Rune Stigart – guitar, keyboards
- Tomas Koefoed – bass
- Brian Rasmussen – drums
