= The Dark Element (album) =

2017 studio album by the Dark Element

Studio album by the Dark Element
- Released: November 10, 2017
- Studios: Alyson Avenue Studios, Sweden (Anette's vocals); YBC (bass); Tico Tico Studio (drums); Biotech Audio Solutions, Finland (piano)
- Genre: Symphonic metal
- Length: 51:51
- Labels: Frontiers; King (Japan only)
- Producers: Jani Liimatainen, Serafino Perugino

The Dark Element chronology
The Dark Element (2017)	Songs the Night Sings (2019)

Professional ratings
Review scores
Source	Rating
Metal Hammer (UK)	3/5 stars
Metal Hammer (GER)	4/7 stars
Prog	(favourable)

The Dark Element is the debut studio album by the Finnish symphonic metal band The Dark Element. It was released on November 10, 2017, through Frontiers Records.

== Track listing ==
All tracks are written by Jani Liimatainen.

No.	Title	Length
1.	"The Dark Element"	4:26
2.	"My Sweet Mystery"	4:59
3.	"Last Good Day"	4:13
4.	"Here's to You"	4:15
5.	"Someone You Used to Know"	4:24
6.	"Dead to Me"	5:28
7.	"Halo"	4:25
8.	"I Cannot Raise the Dead"	4:25
9.	"The Ghost and the Reaper"	5:21
10.	"Heaven of Your Heart"	4:46
11.	"Only One Who Knows Me"	5:09
Total length:		51:51

Japanese edition bonus track
No.	Title	Length
12.	"Dead to Me (Acoustic Version)"	5:07
Total length:		56:58

== Personnel ==
Credits for The Dark Element adapted from liner notes.

The Dark Element

- Anette Olzon – lead and backing vocals
- Jani Liimatainen – guitars, keyboards, programming, backing vocals
- Jonas Kuhlberg – bass
- Jani "Hurtsi" Hurula – drums

Additional musicians

- Jarkko Lahti – piano on tracks 5 and 10
- Niilo Sevänen – growls on track 6
- Anssi Stenberg – backing vocals
- Petri Aho – backing vocals

Production

- Nicke Olsson – engineering (vocals)
- Jonas Kuhlberg – engineering (bass)
- Ahti Kortelainen – engineering (drums)
- Sami Koivisto – engineering (piano)
- Jacob Hansen – mixing, mastering
- Serafino Perugino – executive producer
- Giulio Cataldo – layout

== Chart positions ==
Chart (2017)	Peak position
Finnish Albums (Suomen virallinen lista)	43
Swiss Albums (Schweizer Hitparade)	94
UK Rock & Metal Albums (Official Charts)	14
