= B-Thong =

Swedish metal band

B-Thong was a Swedish groove metal band from Gothenburg that was formed in 1990 and disbanded in 1998.

The band was formed under the name Concrete Stuff but changed their name to B-Thong in 1993. They released three studio albums, as well as one compilation album. The band's latest label was Mascot Records.

== Members ==
=== Final lineup ===
- Ralf "Ralph Lennart" Gyllenhammar – lead vocalist
- Stefan Thuresson – lead guitarist
- Lars "Honcho" Häglund – bassist
- Morgan "Lawbreaker" Pettersson – drummer

=== Former members ===
- Tony Jelencovich – lead vocalist
- Staffan Johansson – drummer

== Discography ==
Studio albums

- Skinned (1994)
- Damage (1995)
- From Strength to Strength (1997)

Compilation album

- The Concrete Collection (2000)
