= The Dark Element =

Finnish/Swedish symphonic metal band

- Genre: Symphonic metal
- Years active: 2017–2025
- Labels: Frontiers; King (Japan only)
- Members: Anette Olzon; Jani Liimatainen; Jonas Kuhlberg; Rolf Pilve
- Past members: Jani "Hurtsi" Hurula

The Dark Element is a symphonic metal band formed by Swedish vocalist and former Nightwish member Anette Olzon and Finnish guitarist and former Sonata Arctica member Jani Liimatainen.

== History ==
In 2016, Frontiers Records offered Jani Liimatainen a deal to record and publish a new album. Liimatainen considered working with a female vocalist because the singers of his previous projects had all been men. Frontiers soon informed him that Anette Olzon would work with him. Also included on this album would be some new songs from 2004 that were never used before.

The project was announced on 29 August 2017. The debut self-titled album was released on 10 November 2017, recorded with bassist Jonas Kuhlberg and drummer Jani Hurula (members of Cain's Offering).

The Dark Element gave its first show at the Sweden Rock Festival on 7 June 2018.

Their second album, Songs the Night Sings was released on 8 November 2019, recorded with new drummer Rolf Pilve (Stratovarius).

On 8 September 2025, Olzon confirmed that The Dark Element has been put on hold.

== Band members ==
=== Last known lineup ===
- Anette Olzon – lead and backing vocals (2017–2025)
- Jani Liimatainen – guitars, keyboards, programming, backing vocals (2017–2025)
- Jonas Kuhlberg – bass (2017–2025)
- Rolf Pilve – drums (2019–2025)

=== Former ===
- Jani "Hurtsi" Hurula – drums (2017–2019)

== Discography ==
=== Studio albums ===
- The Dark Element (2017)
- Songs the Night Sings (2019)

=== Singles ===
- "The Dark Element" (2017)
- "My Sweet Mystery" (2017)
- "Dead to Me" (2017)
- "The Ghost and the Reaper" (2017)
- "Songs the Night Sings" (2019)
- "The Pallbearer Walks Alone" (2019)
- "Not Your Monster" (2019)
