= Swedish Dance Music Awards =

Annual music awards

- Description: Swedish music award recognizing achievements in electronic and dance music
- Country: Sweden
- Presented by: John Wallin and Jonas Siljemark

Swedish Dance Music Awards (also known as Gilbey's Swedish Dance Music Awards and ZTV Dance Music Awards) was a Swedish dance music award that started in 1990 by John Wallin (Pitch Control) and Jonas Siljemark (Siljemark Production).

== History and purpose ==
At that time Swedish dance artists had no national media exposure compared to the massive coverage they were receiving internationally. Wallin and Siljemark felt that the home market of such successful artists didn't give the respect the artists deserved. That is how they came up with the idea of the Swedish Dance Music Awards. It was broadcast live on television and radio and got much media coverage.

== Swedish Dance Music Awards 1991 (as Swedish Discjockey Music Awards) ==
Best Female Artist

- Titiyo (winner)

Best Male Artist

- Papa Dee (winner)

Best Breakthrough Artist

- Dr. Alban (winner)

Best Swedish Group

- Stonefunkers (winner)

Best Producer

- Magnus Frykberg (winner)

Best Live Act

- Stonefunkers (winner)

Best Album

- Titiyo - Titiyo (winner)

Best Dance Album

- Dr. Alban - Hello Africa The Album (winner)

Best Hip Hop Album

- Papa Dee - Lettin' Off Steam (winner)

Best Twelve Inch

- Just D - Vi har vår egen påse (winner)

Best House Twelve Inc

- Clubland - Let's Get Busy (winner)

Best Remix

- Chrille Falk/Stonebridge (winner)

Best Record Company

- Swemix (winner)

Best DJ

- Björn Stavfeldt (winner)

Best Radio DJ

- Clabbe af Gejerstam (winner)

Best Nightclub

- Ritz (winner)

Performances

- Dr. Alban
- Papa Dee
- Snap!
- Stonefunkers

== Swedish Dance Music Awards 1992 ==
Best Male Artist/Crossover

- Tomas Ledin (winner)

Best Female Artist/Crossover

- Eva Dahlgren (winner)

Best Dance Album

- Army Of Lovers - Massive Luxury Overdose (winner)

Best Remix

- Johan Ekelund (winner)

Best Producer

- Stonebridge (winner)

Best Album/Crossover

- Eric Gadd - Do You Believe In Gadd? (winner)

Best Live Act

- Stone-Funkers (winner)

Best Tweøve Inc

- Rob'n'Raz DLC - Bite the Beat (winner)

Best Breakthrough Artist

- Gladys (winner)

Best Radio DJ

- Pontus Enhörning (winner)

Best TV Show/Music

- Kosmopol (winner)

Performances

- Army Of Lovers
- DaYeene
- Cecilia Ray
- 2 Unlimited

== Swedish Dance Music Awards 1993 (as Gilbey's Dance Music Awards) ==
Best Artist/Group

- Clubland (winner)

Best Breakthrough Artist

- Ace of Base (winner)

Best Internatyional Dance Artist

- Stereo Mc's (winner)

Best Dance Album

- Clubland - Adventures Beyond Clubland (winner)

Best Producer

- Denniz Pop (winner)

Best Remiz

- Denniz Pop (winner)

Best Twelce Inch

- Dr. Alban - "It's My Life" (winner)

Best Radio Dj

- Pontus Enhörning (winner)

Best TV Show/Music

- Clubbhopping/Swedish Dance Chart (winner)

Golden Plate Of The Music Business

- Dr. Alban/Denniz Pop (winner)

Performances

- Ace of Base
- East 17
- Dr. Alban
- Rob'n'Raz

== Swedish Dance Music Awards 1994 (as Gilbey's Dance Music Awards) ==
Best Radio DJ

- Amanda Rydman, "Program Signal", P3, Swedish Broadcasting Co.
- Jesse Wallin, Radio City/Stockholm
- Mats Nileskar, "Soul Corner, P3, Swedish Broadcasting Co.
- Pontus Enhörning, "Tval", P3, Swedish Broadcasting Co. (winner)

Best Newcomer

- Basic Element
- Pandora
- Jennifer Brown
- Stakka Bo (winner)

Best Swedish Dance Track

- Melodie MC – Dum Da Dum
- Stakka Bo – Here We Go
- Dr. Alban – Sing Hallelujah
- Rob'n'Raz – In Command (winner)

Best Swedish Dance Artist/Group

- Jennifer Brown
- Ace of Base (winner)
- Stakka Bo
- Rob'n'Raz

Best Swedish Producer

- StoneBridge
- Statikk & Tom Droid
- Anders Bagge
- Denniz Pop (winner)

Best Foreign Dance Artist/Group

- M People
- Culture Beat (winner)
- Haddaway
- Robin S.

Best Swedish Remixer

- Anders Bagge for Rob'n'Raz/Clubhopping, Papa Dee/Ain't No Sunshine
- J.J. for Legacy of Sound/Can't Let You Go, Flexx/Wake Up, Jennifer Brown/Heaven Come Down
- Douglas Carr/Denniz PoP for Dr. Alban/Sing Hallelujah (mixes)
- Stonebridge for Robin S./Show Me Love, Staxx/Joy, Rage/Give It Up, Legacy Of Sound/Happy, Jennifer Brown/Heaven Come Down (winner)

Best Swedish Dance Album

- Stakka Bo – Supermarket
- Rob'n'Raz – Spectrum (winner)
- Ace of Base – Happy Nation - US version
- Pandora – One Of A Kind

Guldtallrikens Branch Award

- GSDMA's special jury chose a person/company who did something special for the Swedish dance music industry.

No nominations, winner was presented at the Awards.

ZTV Video Awards
Best Swedish Dance Video

- Stakka Bo – Down the Drain (winner)
- Rob'n'Raz – In Command
- Just D – Vart tog den söta lilla flickan vägen
- Dr. Alban – Sing Hallelujah

ZTV Video Awards
Best Music Video (Free music style, any country)

- Voted by ZTV viewers. Nominations and winners presented at the Awards.

ZTV Video Awards
Best Swedish Video (Free music style)

- Voted by ZTV's special jury. Nominations and winners presented at the Awards.

Performances on the TV-show

- Jennifer Brown – Take a Piece of My Heart
- Juliet Roberts – Caught in the Middle
- Stakka Bo – On Your Knees
- Dr Alban – Look Who's Talking
- Maxx – Get-A-Way
- Just D – Vart tog den söta lilla flickan vägen
- Culture Beat – Anything

== Swedish Dance Music Awards 1995 (as Gilbey's Dance Music Awards) ==
Best Swedish Dance Track 94

- E-Type – This is the Way (winner)
- E-Type – Set the World on Fire
- Herbie – Pick It Up
- Rednex – Cotton Eye Joe

Best Swedish Remix 94

- 3rd Nation – I Believe/Remix by Stonebridge & Nick Nice
- E-Type – This is the Way/Remix by Kristian Lundin & John Amatiello (Amadin)
- Herbie – Pick It Up/Remix By Douglas Carr (winner)
- Melodie MC – Give It Up/Remix by Denniz Pop

Best Swedish Producer

- Anders Bagge for Fatima Rainey, Jennifer Brown
- Denniz Pop for Dr. Alban, E-Type, Herbie (winner)
- Pat Reiniz for Rednex, Cool James
- Stonebridge for Robin S., 3rd Nation, Sabrina Johnston, Shawn Christopher

Best Swedish Underground 94

- MONDAY BAR (Downtown Stockhold) For their great club evenings
- Record Label CLUBVISION
- Record Label LOOP
- StoneBridge For all his clubgrooves (winner)

Best Newcomer 94

- E-Type (winner)
- Herbie
- Latin Kings
- Rednex

Best Swedish Dance Video 94

- Dr. Alban – Let the Beat Go On (Director: Jonathan Bate)
- E-Type – This is the Way (Director: Matthew Broadley)
- Herbie – Pick It Up (Director: Debbie Bourne)
- Rednex – Cotton Eye Joe (Director: Stefan Berg) (winner)

Best Swedish Dance Album 94

- Basic Element – Basic Injection
- Dr. Alban – Look Who's Talking (winner)
- E-Type – Made in Sweden
- Cool James & Black Teacher – Zooming You

Best International Dance Artist

- Ice MC
- M People
- Reel 2 Real (winner)
- Warren G

Best Swedish Dance Artist 94

- Herbie
- Ace of Base
- E-Type (winner)
- Rednex

Guldtallrikens Branch Award 94

- Stockholm Records (winner)

== Swedish Dance Music Awards 1996 ==
Best Dance Artist

- Herbie (winner)

Best Dance Album

- Infinite Mass – The Infinite Patio (winner)

Best Newcomer

- Robyn (winner)

Best Hip Hop/R&B Artist

- Infinite Mass (winner)

Best Swedish Dance Track

- Herbie – Right Type of Mood
- Infinite Mass – Area Turns Red (winner)
- Papa Dee – The First Cut Is the Deepest

Dance Song Of The Year

- Robin Cook – I Won't Let the Sun Go Down (winner)

Best Swedish Producer

- Stonebridge & Nick Nice
- Denniz Pop & Max Martin (winner)
- Pierre Jerksten
- Douglas Carr

Best Remixer

- Stonebridge & Nick Nice (winner)
- Pierre Jerksten
- JJ
- DJ Blackhead

Best Foreign Dance Artist

- Coolio (winner)

Special Music Industry Prize

- Mats Nileskar for his radio programme "Soulcorner" (winner)

Best Underground

- Dunkla Recordings (winner)

ZTV Viewers Prize For Best Scandinavian Video

- Addis Black Widow – Innocent (winner)

== Swedish Dance Music Awards 1997 ==
Best Swedish Dance Artist 1996

- Lutricia McNeal
- Rob'n'Raz DLC
- E-Type (winner)
- Papa Dee

Best Swedish Producer 1996

- EZ Production
- Denniz Pop & Max Martin for work with Leila K, Papa Dee and George (winner)
- Pierre Jerksten
- Stonebridge

Best Swedish Dance Album 1996

- Blacknuss - Allstars
- E-Type - Explorer
- Papa Dee - The Journey
- Rob'n'Raz – Circus (winner)

Best Swedish Breakthrough Artist 1996

- George
- George Cole
- Goldmine
- Lutricia McNeal – Ain't That Just the Way (winner)

Best House/Techno Artist

- Antiloop
- Cari Lekebusch
- Pierre Jerksten
- Tellus (Pierre Jerksten project)

Best Swedish Remix 1996

- Antiloop for E-Type
- Pierre J for Dr. Alban, Knockabout & Tellus
- Rob'n'Raz for Rob'n'Raz (Take a Ride) (winner)
- Stonebridge for Inner Circle, Goldmine & Tanya Louise

Best Swedish Dance Song 1996

- Blacknuss - Dinah
- Lutricia McNeal - Ain't That Just the Way
- Rob'n'Raz – Take A Ride (winner)
- Robin Cook - I Won't Let The Sun Go Down

Best International Dance Artist 1996

- 2Pac & Dr. Dre
- Faithless (winner)
- The Fugees
- The Prodigy

Swedish Hip Hop/R&B Artist 1996

- Blacknuss (winner)
- Lutricia McNeal
- Rob'n'Raz Circus
- Robyn

ZTV's Best Dance Video 1996 Award

- Lutricia McNeal - Ain't That Just the Way
- E-Type – Free Like a Flying Demon (winner)
- Rob'n'Raz feat. D-Flex - Take A Ride
- Leila K - Rude Boy

== Swedish Dance Music Awards 1998 ==
Best House/Techno

- Antiloop (winner)

Best Album

- Antiloop (winner)

Best Dance Track

- Antiloop – In My Mind (winner)

Best Artist/Group

- Antiloop (winner)

Best R&B Artist

- Eric Gadd (winner)

Best Producer

- Denniz Pop (winner)

Best Newcomers

- Drömhus (winner)

Best Remix

- Cue – Burnin' (C&N Project Remix) (winner)

Best Foreign Dance Artist

- Sash! (winner)
