= Pierre Jerksten =

- Also known as: Hertz, Pierre J
- Born: September 20, 1972 (age 53); Tynnered, Göteborg
- Genres: House, Techno
- Occupation: DJ
- Years active: (1994–present)
- Labels: Defected, Toolroom Records, Underwater Records, Drumcode, Recycled Loops, Craft Music, Tresor, Virgin, Universal, Sway, Q-Records, Abyss Records, Atom, M4M, Hz Trax
- Website: http://www.pierrej.com/?lang=en

Pierre Jerksten is a Swedish disc jockey known for hosting radio shows and his work under his alias Hertz.

== Disc jockey ==
Jerksten started out as a DJ 1989 in Gothenburg but became famous in Sweden when he participated in DMC DJ Championship and ended up as number 2 in Sweden and Europe and the following year was number 1 in Sweden and number 5 in the DMC World DJ Championship.

== Pierre J ==
During the 90s he produced and remixed artist like Dr Alban, E-Type, Eric Gadd, Meja, Emilia, Adolphson & Falk, Melodie MC featuring Jocelyn Brown, Fatima Rainey, Clubland, Alexia & Tellus on over 200 records. He was nominated as best Swedish producer, best Swedish remixer, and best Swedish House/Techno Artist by the Swedish Dance Music Awards in 1996.

== Radio and television ==
Jerksten's career as a weekly host on National Radio P3 started in 1996. Until 2011, he hosted shows including P3 Mix, P3 Remix, P3 Klubb and P3 Dans. He also wrote music to the programs Fotbollskväll, Hockeykväll, Packat & Klart, and Trafikmagasinet, that were broadcast on National Swedish Television, SVT.

== Hertz ==
The greater part of the 2000s was devoted to his own record labels Sway, Q-Records, Abyss Records, Atom, M4M, Hz Trax and his alias Hertz. Pierre has been releasing on labels such as Defected, Toolroom Records, Underwater Records, Drumcode, Recycled Loops, Craft Music, Tresor, Virgin & Universal. He also done events and festivals around Europe, among those at Dance Valley, Awakenings, Fabrik, Florida 135, Le Zenith & The Matrixx.
