= Clubhopping =

Single by Rob'n'Raz

from the album Clubhopping (The Album)
- Released: 1993
- Studio: Lounge Studios
- Genre: Eurodance; house
- Length: 3:19
- Label: Telegram Records Stockholm; WEA
- Songwriters: Rob'n'Raz; Lutricia McNeal
- Producer: Rob'n'Raz

Rob'n'Raz singles chronology
"Rok the Nation" (1990)	"Clubhopping" (1993)	"In Command" (1993)

Music video
- "Clubhopping" on YouTube

"Clubhopping" is a song by Swedish dance music duo Rob'n'Raz, featuring American singer Lutricia McNeal and rapper D-Flex. Released in 1993 by Telegram Records Stockholm and WEA as the lead single from the duo's second album, Clubhopping (The Album) (1992), it achieved some success in Europe. The song is written by Rob'n'Raz with McNeal and became a top-10 hit in both the Netherlands and Finland, peaking at number nine and ten, respectively. In the duo's native Sweden, "Clubhopping" charted in the top 20, peaking at number thirteen.

== Critical reception ==
A reviewer from Music & Media commented, "Hopping from club to club and from station to station, this bouncy tune will be omnipresent. A bit reminiscent of Incognito's 'Always There', which probably explains why there's no escaping." In 1994, the magazine's Robbert Tilli wrote, "In the Asterix cartoons, all villagers put parsley in their ears when the dreadful bard starts singing. Sometimes it seems like radio programmers do the same when a really good dance song comes along. One of the biggest misses last year was Rob 'N' Raz's sing-along groover 'Clubhopping', which deserved a better destiny than the stations' riling cabinets."

== Track listing ==
- 7" single, Sweden (1992)
1. "Clubhopping" (Radio Version) — 3:19
2. "Clubhopping" (Instrumental Version) — 3:19
- 12" single, Germany (1993)
1. "Clubhopping" (Extended Version) — 5:49
2. "Clubhopping" (Radio Edit) — 3:33
3. "Clubhopping" (Legacy of Sound Remix) — 5:17
4. "Clubhopping" (Rob 'N' Raz Strictly Dub) — 7:40
- CD maxi, Europe (1993)
1. "Clubhopping" (Radio Edit) — 3:33
2. "Clubhopping" (Legacy of Sound Radioremix) — 4:17
3. "Clubhopping" (Legacy of Sound Remix) — 5:17
4. "Clubhopping" (Extended Version) — 5:49

== Charts ==
=== Weekly charts ===
Chart (1993)	Peak position
Finland (Suomen virallinen lista)	10
Netherlands (Dutch Top 40)	9
Netherlands (Single Top 100)	11
Sweden (Sverigetopplistan)	13
UK Club Chart (Music Week)	41

=== Year-end charts ===
Chart (1993)	Position
Netherlands (Dutch Top 40)	100
