= Give It Up! (For the Melodie) =

1994 single by Melodie MC

Single by Melodie MC

from the album The Return
- Released: 24 October 1994
- Studio: Sidelake Studio 1
- Length: 4:13
- Label: Sidelake Productions; Virgin
- Songwriter: Melodie MC

Melodie MC singles chronology
"I Wanna Dance" (1993)	"Give It Up! (For the Melodie)" (1994)	"Anyone Out There" (1995)

Music video
- "Give It Up! (For the Melodie)" on YouTube

"Give It Up! (For the Melodie)" is a song by Swedish recording artist Melodie MC (Kent Lövgren), released in October 1994, by Sidelake Productions and Virgin Records, as the first single from the artist's second album, The Return (1995). Written by him, the song also features vocals by Susanne Bertlin and peaked at number six in Sweden. It also peaked at number one on the Swedish Dance chart as well as charting on the Eurochart Hot 100 and in Australia. The remix by Denniz Pop was nominated in the category for Best Swedish Remix 1994 at the 1995 Swedish Dance Music Awards.

== Track listing ==
- 12", UK (1994)
1. "Give It Up! (For the Melodie)" (Remix by Denniz Pop) — 3:43
2. "Give It Up! (For the Melodie)" (Club) — 6:05
3. "Give It Up! (For the Melodie)" (Doug's Clubmix) — 6:07
4. "Give It Up! (For the Melodie)" (Doug's Phantommix) — 4:51
- CD single, Europe (1994)
1. "Give It Up! (For the Melodie)" (Radio) — 4:13
2. "Give It Up! (For the Melodie)" (Club) — 6:05
- CD maxi, Europe (1994)
1. "Give It Up! (For the Melodie)" (Radio) — 4:13
2. "Give It Up! (For the Melodie)" (Club) — 6:05
3. "Give It Up! (For the Melodie)" (Remix by Denniz Pop) — 3:43
4. "Give It Up! (For the Melodie)" (Doug's Clubmix) — 6:07
5. "Give It Up! (For the Melodie)" (Doug's Phantommix) — 4:51

== Charts ==
=== Weekly charts ===
Weekly chart performance for "Give It Up! (For the Melodie)"
Chart (1994)	Peak position
Australia (ARIA)	98
Europe (Eurochart Hot 100)	84
Sweden (Sverigetopplistan)	6
Sweden Dance (Swedish Dance Chart)	1
Sweden Airplay (Swedish Radio Chart Tracks)	11

=== Year-end charts ===
Year-end chart performance for "Give It Up! (For the Melodie)"
Chart (1994)	Position
Sweden (Topplistan)	71
