= Raxola =

Belgian rock band

- Origin: Brussels, Belgium
- Genres: Punk rock, post-punk
- Years active: 1977–present
- Labels: Philips, RAX
- Members: Yke Raxola (Yves Kengen); Phil Bertran; Lucas Lepori; Fab Giacinto
- Past members: Mario Zola; Benny Lust; Dave Porzio; Hadrien Lavogez; Philémon Noirret; Louis Hubeau; Guy Van Snick
- Website: http://raxola.net

Raxola is a Belgian rock band, originally from Brussels. The band has reunited several times over the years with different line-ups.

== History ==
After playing with Brian James (The Damned) in Bastard, Yves Kengen created Raxola in Brussels in 1977 with Louis Louis (Louis Houbet, aka Llouis) and Snikkey (Guy Van Snick). Along with their Antwerp-based labelmates The Kids, they are one of three Belgian groups (the third being Hubble Bubble that featured a young Plastic Bertrand on drums) to have had the opportunity of recording an album at the very start of the local punk scene.

In 1978, a year after coming together, the band released their first studio album, the self-titled Raxola largely recorded live to tape.

Twenty years later in 1998, several tracks by these groups were released on pirate compilations that revived interest in Belgian punk. Raxola's debut album subsequently generated interest on the collector's market, prompting Kengen to republish it as a CD in 2001, released by Disk Union in Japan in 2003.

The group underwent many line-up changes after returning to the stage in 2003. In 2004, Raxola released a single, I Wanna Be an Angel, produced by Brian James (The Damned, the Lords of the New Church). A live EP called Live in O'five, closer to alternative rock than early punk, was released in 2005. The group later stopped performing.

A new album was announced in February 2017 followed by a return to live concerts at the Rock Nation Festival^{5}. In April 2017, a two-track single was released from the future album: Come Back Shoes and Stakhanovist Punk, followed by gigs with a new line-up. The album Guts Out, produced by Thierry Plas (ex-Machiavel) and Yves Kengen, came out in September 2017. More rock'n'roll than punk, the band consists of Yke Raxola (Yves Kengen), Phil Bertran, Lucas Lepori and Fab Giacinto. The album includes the singles Paranoïzed, Waiting for WW3 and Come Back Shoes.
