= Carousel (Leila K album) =

Studio album by Leila K
- Released: 1993
- Studio: Cheiron Studios, SweMix Studios
- Genre: Dance, Pop, House
- Label: Mega, Polydor
- Producer: Denniz Pop, Douglas Carr

Leila K chronology
Rob'n'Raz featuring Leila K (1990)	Carousel (1993)	Manic Panic (1996)

Singles from Carousel
- 1. "Open Sesame" Released: 1992; 2. "Ça Plane Pour Moi / Check the Dan" Released: 1993; 3. "Slow Motion" Released: 1993; 4. "Close Your Eyes"

Professional ratings
Review scores
Source	Rating
AllMusic	4/5 stars
Melody Maker	(mixed)
Select	1/5 medals

Carousel is an album by Swedish singer and rapper Leila K, released in 1993.

== Critical reception ==
Dean Carlson from AllMusic wrote, "Carousel was over-produced, overlong, overly flawed -- and really quite good. A few minutes in, you're confronted with a glittery, elated acid house number that quickly and frighteningly transforms into a mindwarping pop epic of trance strings, false endings, and Swedish breakbeat patois-rap, and just a few tracks later, a song called "Slow Motion" spins out from under its foundational flavor of European techno-reggae and ends up sounding like a cross between M/A/R/R/S, Madonna, Mis-Teeq, and Big Audio Dynamite. Absurd and unquestionably wonderful."

== Track listing ==
1. "Carousel" (Denniz PoP, Douglas Carr, Deep Fried, Al Agami) 6:08
2. "Open Sesame" (Denniz PoP, Douglas Carr, Deep Fried) 8:49
3. "Ça Plane Pour Moi" (Lou Deprijck, Yvan Lacomblez) 5:47
4. "Slow Motion" (Denniz PoP, Douglas Carr, Deep Fried, Al Agami) 4:00
5. "Glam!" (Denniz PoP, Douglas Carr, Deep Fried) 3:43
6. "Check the Dan" (Denniz PoP, Douglas Carr, Deep Fried, Leila K) 5:22
7. "Pyramid" (Deep Fried, Al Agami, Vito Ingrosso) 4:34
8. "Massively Massive" (Denniz PoP, Douglas Carr, Deep Fried, Al Agami) 4:22
9. "Close Your Eyes" (Denniz PoP, Douglas Carr, Chuck Anthony, Deep Fried, Leila K) 3:20
10. "Open Sesame" (Last Exit Remix) 4:23
11. "Ca plane pour moi" (Felix Remix) 7:12

== Charts ==
Chart (1993)	Peak position
Austrian Albums (Ö3 Austria)	10
Dutch Albums (Album Top 100)	89
German Albums (Offizielle Top 100)	30
Hungarian Albums (MAHASZ)	37
Swedish Albums (Sverigetopplistan)	30
Swiss Albums (Schweizer Hitparade)	32
