= Power House (song) =

Single by Rob'n'Raz

from the album Spectrum
- Released: 1994
- Genre: Eurodance; house
- Length: 3:10
- Label: Warner Music
- Songwriters: David Seisay; Rob'n'Raz; Lutricia McNeal
- Producer: Rob'n'Raz

Rob'n'Raz singles chronology
"In Command" (1993)	"Power House" (1994)	"Take a Ride" (1996)

Music video
- "Power House" on YouTube

"Power House" is a 1994 song by Swedish dance music duo Rob'n'Raz, featuring American singer Lutricia McNeal and rapper D-Flex. It was released as the third and last single from the duo's third album, Spectrum (1993), and peaked at number 12 in Sweden, with a total of 12 weeks within the singles chart. The song also topped the Swedish dance chart and charted in Finland, where it reached number 13.

== Track listing ==
- Sweden, CD maxi (1994)
1. "Power House" (Radio Version) – 3:10
2. "Power House" (Extended Version) – 5:48
3. "Power House" (Drutten och Jena Remix) – 5:32
4. "Power House" (Album Version) – 4:36
5. "Power House" (Power Beats) – 2:41

== Charts ==
Chart (1994)	Peak position
Finland (IFPI)	13
Israel (Israeli Singles Chart)	8
Sweden (Sverigetopplistan)	12
Sweden (Swedish Dance Chart)	1
