= Electric (Leila K song) =

Single by Leila K

from the album Manic Panic
- B-side: "Remix"
- Released: 1995
- Genre: Eurodance
- Length: 3:35
- Label: Mega Records
- Songwriters: Denniz PoP; Max Martin; Herbie Crichlow; Leila K; Chris Barbosa; Ed Chisolm
- Producers: Denniz PoP; Max Martin

Leila K singles chronology
"Slow Motion" (1993)	"Electric" (1995)	"C'Mon Now" (1996)

Music video
- "Electric" on YouTube

"Electric" is a song recorded and co-written by Swedish artist Leila K. It is produced by Denniz Pop and Max Martin, and released as a single in late 1995 by Mega Records. In 1996, it was included on Leila K's third album, Manic Panic (1996). The chorus is performed by Swedish singer Jessica Folcker. The single was a top-10 hit in both Finland and Sweden, peaking at numbers two and eight. In Israel and Belgium, it was a top-20 and top-40 hit, reaching numbers 17 and 37. On the Eurochart Hot 100, "Electric" peaked at number 86 in March 1996. The music video for the song was directed by Ragnar Jansson and nominated for a Swedish Dance Award in 1997.

== Composition ==
The song's chorus has the same melody as Shannon's 1984 dance hit "Give Me Tonight". Chris Barbosa and Ed Chisolm share songwriting credits for the song. In the 2020 book, Move Your Body (2 The 90s): Unlimited Eurodance, writer Juha Soininen noted, "It also breaks the pattern of male raps: Leila raps and Jessica Folcker has the refrain. In its ferocity and aggressiveness, it encapsulates the best sides of Eurodance."

== Critical reception ==
Pan-European magazine Music & Media wrote that the Denniz Pop-produced song "shows that Leila K is still 'The First Lady of Rap'." In September 2024, Swedish national radio Sveriges Radio P3 ranked "Electric" among the world's 300 best songs.

== Music video ==
The accompanying music video for "Electric" was directed by Ragnar Jansson. In the video, Leila K and Jessica Folcker are dancing in a factory setting where two kendōka practice kendo. It was nominated for a Swedish Dance Award in 1997.

== Track listing ==
1. "Electric" (Short Version) - 3:33
2. "Electric" (Long Version) - 5:54
3. "Electric" (Housecontrol Remix) - 9:29

=== Versions ===
- Short Version 3:35
- Long Version 5:55
- Vocal Remix 6:12
- Merlyn's Dub Mix 6:01
- Vocal Remix 6:12
- Power Mix 5:16
- Housecontrol Remix 9:29

== Charts ==
=== Weekly charts ===
Chart (1995)	Peak position
Belgium (Ultratop 50 Flanders)	37
Europe (Eurochart Hot 100)	86
Finland (Suomen virallinen lista)	2
Germany (Media Control Charts)	61
Israel (Israeli Singles Chart)	17
Netherlands (Dutch Top 40 Tipparade)	19
Netherlands (Dutch Single Tip)	14
Sweden (Sverigetopplistan)	8

=== Year-end charts ===
Chart (1996)	Position
Sweden (Topplistan)	93
