= Manic Panic =

Manic Panic may refer to:

- Manic Panic (brand), a line of cosmetic hair coloring
- Manic Panic (album), a 1996 album by Leila K
