= List of number-one singles of 1978 (France) =

This is a list of the French Singles & Airplay Chart Reviews number-ones of 1978.

== Summary ==
=== Singles Chart ===
Week	Date	Artist	Single
1	6 January	Sheila and Black Devotion	"Singin' in the Rain Part 1"
2	13 January	Boney M.	"Belfast"
3	20 January	Boney M.	"Belfast"
4	27 January	Boney M.	"Belfast"
5	3 February	Adriano Celentano	"Don't Play That Song"
6	10 February	Umberto Tozzi	"Ti amo"
7	17 February	Umberto Tozzi	"Ti amo"
8	24 February	Plastic Bertrand	"Ça plane pour moi"
9	3 March	Plastic Bertrand	"Ça plane pour moi"
10	10 March	Umberto Tozzi	"Ti amo"
11	17 March	Bee Gees	"How Deep Is Your Love"
12	24 March	Queen	"We Will Rock You"
13	31 March	Queen	"We Will Rock You"
14	7 April	Claude François	"Magnolias Forever"
15	14 April	Claude François	"Magnolias Forever"
16	21 April	Bee Gees	"How Deep Is Your Love"
17	28 April	Bee Gees	"How Deep Is Your Love"
18	5 May	Bee Gees	"How Deep Is Your Love"
19	12 May	Bee Gees	"How Deep Is Your Love"
20	19 May	Bee Gees	"How Deep Is Your Love"
21	26 May	Bee Gees	"How Deep Is Your Love"
22	2 June	Bonnie Tyler	"It's a Heartache"
23	9 June	Bonnie Tyler	"It's a Heartache"
24	16 June	Bonnie Tyler	"It's a Heartache"
25	23 June	Boney M.	"Rivers of Babylon"
26	30 June	Boney M.	"Rivers of Babylon"
27	7 July	Boney M.	"Rivers of Babylon"
28	14 July	Boney M.	"Rivers of Babylon"
29	21 July	Michel Sardou	"En chantant"
30	28 July	Michel Sardou	"En chantant"
31	4 August	Michel Sardou	"En chantant"
32	11 August	Michel Sardou	"En chantant"
33	18 August	Michel Sardou	"En chantant"
34	25 August	Michel Sardou	"En chantant"
35	1 September	Bee Gees	"Stayin' Alive"
36	8 September	Bee Gees	"Stayin' Alive"
37	15 September	John Travolta and Olivia Newton-John	"You're the One That I Want"
38	22 September	John Travolta and Olivia Newton-John	"You're the One That I Want"
39	29 September	John Travolta and Olivia Newton-John	"You're the One That I Want"
40	6 October	John Travolta and Olivia Newton-John	"You're the One That I Want"
41	13 October	John Travolta and Olivia Newton-John	"You're the One That I Want"
42	20 October	John Travolta and Olivia Newton-John	"You're the One That I Want"
43	27 October	John Travolta and Olivia Newton-John	"You're the One That I Want"
44	3 November	John Travolta and Olivia Newton-John	"You're the One That I Want"
45	10 November	John Travolta and Olivia Newton-John	"You're the One That I Want"
46	17 November	John Travolta and Olivia Newton-John	"You're the One That I Want"
47	24 November	John Travolta and Olivia Newton-John	"You're the One That I Want"
48	1 December	John Travolta and Olivia Newton-John	"You're the One That I Want"
49	8 December	John Travolta and Olivia Newton-John	"You're the One That I Want"
50	15 December	John Travolta and Olivia Newton-John	"You're the One That I Want"
51	22 December	John Travolta and Olivia Newton-John	"You're the One That I Want"
52	29 December	Julio Iglesias / Village People	"Le monde est fou, le monde est beau" / "Y.M.C.A."

^1On the week of December 29, 1978, both songs shared the top position of the charts.

== See also ==
- 1978 in music
- List of number-one hits (France)
