= Hubble bubble =

Hubble bubble may refer to:

- Hookah, a water-cooled apparatus for smoking
- Hubble bubble (astronomy), a local anomaly in the Hubble constant
- a variant of the bubble and squeak in English cuisine
- Hubble Bubble, a Belgian punk band

== See also ==
- Hubble sphere
