= Dr. Feelgood =

Dr. Feelgood may refer to:

== Music ==
- Dr. Feelgood, recording and alternative stage name of American blues musician Piano Red (1911–1985), who also recorded as Dr. Feelgood and the Interns
- "Dr. Feelgood (Love Is a Serious Business)", a song from the 1967 album I Never Loved a Man the Way I Love You by Aretha Franklin
- Dr. Feelgood (band), a British pub rock band formed in 1971
- Dr. Feelgood (album), a 1989 album by the American band Mötley Crüe
- "Dr. Feelgood" (Mötley Crüe song), 1989
- "Dr. Feelgood" (Cool James and Black Teacher song), 1994
- "Dr. Feel Good", a 2010 song by Travie McCoy on the album Lazarus

== People ==
- Dr. Feelgood, colloquial term for a person who performs a type of quackery
- Max Jacobson, John F. Kennedy's personal physician was called a Dr. Feelgood by the press
- George C. Nichopoulos, Elvis Presley's personal physician was called a Dr. Feelgood by the press

== Other uses ==
- "Dr. Feelgood", an episode of the TV show Moonlight
