= Naldecon =

Naldecon, a brand name for phenylephrine, is a sympathomimetic drug and decongestant.

== In popular culture ==
On June 16, 2007, an empty prescription pill bottle for Naldecon prescribed to Elvis Presley was sold at the annual Julien's Summer Auction for $2,640. The medication was prescribed to Presley by his physician, George Nichopoulos.
