= Elton Motello =

English punk and New Wave band

Elton Motello were an English punk rock and new wave band.

Elton Motello is both the moniker of Alan Ward, the lead singer and songwriter, and the name of the band itself. Alan Ward was formerly a member of the glam punk band Bastard along with Damned guitarist Brian James, Dez Lover, future Raxola frontman Yves Kengen on bass, and drummer Nobby Goff.

Ward then recruited a new set of musicians who became the band Elton Motello: Peter Goff (guitar), Willie Change (bass), and Nobby Goff (drums), with Ward himself (as Elton Motello) on vocals and percussion. This is the line-up listed on their debut album Victim of Time, which also featured guest appearances from former The Pretty Things and Pink Fairies drummer John "Twink" Alder, Tony Boast (guitar), and Mike Butcher (as Jet Staxx), who had played guitar on the single version of "Jet Boy, Jet Girl".

Ward/Motello returned in 1980 with a second album, Pop Art, now backed by Butcher, Andrew Goldberg, J.P. Martins, and Walter Mets. Two singles followed towards the end of the year, after which the band split up.

== "Jet Boy, Jet Girl" ==
Alan Ward had toured Belgium with Bastard. Through his connections there, he had his new moniker, Elton Motello, debut on the Belgian label RKM with the single "Jet Boy, Jet Girl" in 1977. The song was backed by session musicians Mike Butcher (guitar), John Valcke (bass), and Bob Dartsch (drums), instead of Elton Motello's regular musicians. That exact same backing track was simultaneously used by Belgian artist Plastic Bertrand on his internationally successful hit single "Ça plane pour moi". Since then, "Jet Boy, Jet Girl" has sometimes been wrongly thought to be a cover of "Ça plane pour moi", with new lyrics over the same backing track, but the truth is that the two songs were simultaneous adaptations of the same backing track.

While Bertrand's single was a huge international hit, Motello's single in English was a night club hit in Europe, U.S.A., Japan, & Australia, where it was released on the RCA label and hit #33 on the National Top Forty (and regionally in Melbourne at #11 and in Sydney, at #10). Also in Australia, "Jet Boy, Jet Girl" has appeared in a television commercial, but the commercial only included the chorus and none of the controversial lyrics.

== Discography ==
=== Albums ===
Year	Title
1978	Victim of Time
1980	Pop Art
2001	Jet Boy (compilation)

=== Singles ===
Year	Title	AUS
1977	"Jet Boy, Jet Girl"	33
1978	"Pinball"	-
1978	"Lightning"	-
1980	"20th Century Fox"	-
1980	"Pop Art"	-

== After Pop Art ==
Alan Ward, after his time with Elton Motello, continued his musical career through producing music. He produced albums for various artists, including Plastic Bertrand, the musician behind "Ça plane pour moi", the sister song of "Jet Boy, Jet Girl". Alan Ward lives in Belgium where he works as a producer at Electric City Recording Studio.
