= In Command (song) =

1993 single by Rob'n'Raz

Single by Rob'n'Raz

from the album Clubhopping (The Album)
- Released: November 1993
- Genre: Eurodance; dance-pop; house
- Length: 3:44 (Original Radio Edit); 4:19 (Remix Radio Edit)
- Label: Telegram Records Stockholm; Warner Music
- Songwriters: David Seisay; Rob'n'Raz; Lutricia McNeal
- Producer: Rob'n'Raz

Rob'n'Raz singles chronology
"Clubhopping" (1993)	"In Command" (1993)	"Power House" (1994)

Music video
- "In Command" on YouTube

"In Command" is a song by Swedish dance music duo Rob'n'Raz, featuring American singer Lutricia McNeal and rapper D-Flex, released in November 1993 by Telegram Records Stockholm and Warner Music as the fourth single from the duo's second album, Clubhopping (The Album) (1992). The song was produced and co-written by Rob'n'Raz with McNeal and D-Flex, and became a number-one hit in Sweden, with 17 weeks within the Swedish singles chart. It was also a top-5 hit in Finland and a top 40-hit on the Eurochart Hot 100. "In Command" won an award in the category for Best Swedish Dance Track 1993 at the 1994 Swedish Dance Music Awards, and its accompanying music video was nominated for Best Swedish Dance Video 1993 at the same award.

== Critical reception ==
Upon the release of the single, pan-European magazine Music & Media wrote, "The club hoppers celebrate their first Swedish number 1 hit with a "Culture Haddaway Project" type of bleeping pop dance stomper according to the proven male rap/female chorus formula."

== Chart performance ==
"In Command" became a successful number-one hit in the duo's native Sweden for one week, with a total of 17 weeks within Sverigetopplistan. It debuted on the chart as number 35 on 27 October 1993, before peaking at the top seven weeks later, on 8 December. The song is also Rob'n'Raz' only number-one hit in Sweden and ended up as the 27th most-sold single in Sweden in 1993. In Finland, "In Command" became a top-5 hit, peaking at number four. On the Eurochart Hot 100, it became a top-40 hit, reaching number 39 in January 1994, after debuting at number 85 in December 1993. In the UK, the song reached number 87 on the UK Singles Chart and became a smaller club hit, peaking at number 92 on the Record Mirror Club Chart in November 1993. "In Command" also charted in Israel, peaking at number three.

== Music video ==
The music video for "In Command" takes place in a large white room, where a group of men come in and sit down on separate chairs. Lutricia McNeal performs among them in a commanding manner, wearing a tight suit. The men then lay all the chairs on top of each other in a large pile, before they hand over a green apple to the next person who in turn passes it on. Sometimes a black mini pig is seen walking around on the floor. D-Flex raps with his muscular upper body bare. The men each then pick up their chairs from the pile and sit down on it again. As the video ends, they are sitting around a long covered table, apparently ready for a meal. As the lid of the dish on the table is lifted, it is revealed that it's a green apple.

The video received exposure on music channels such as MTV Europe and was nominated in the category for Best Swedish Dance Video 1993 at the Swedish Dance Music Awards 1994. In the 2020 book, Move Your Body (2 The 90s): Unlimited Eurodance, Juha Soininen remarked that "In Command" had "a very visual music video, where Lutricia's and D-Flex's best parts were exploited with humorous undertones."

== Track listing ==
- 7-inch single, Europe (1993)

A. "In Command" (Remix Radio Edit) — 4:19
B. "In Command" (Original Radio Edit) — 3:44

- 12-inch vinyl, Europe (1993)

A1. "In Command" (Extended Version) — 5:23
A2. "In Command" (Nice & Stones Club Dub) — 4:36
B1. "In Command" (Indee's H-Way Judgement Mix) — 5:54
B2. "In Command" (Radio Edit) — 3:44

- 12-inch vinyl, UK (1994)

A1. "In Command" (Seize Command Mix) — 6:21
A2. "In Command" (Instrumental) — 8:54
B1. "In Command" (Extended Version) — 5:22
B2. "In Command" (Nice & Stones Club Dub) — 4:23
B3. "In Command" (Indees H-Way Judgement Mix) — 5:54

- CD single, France (1993)
1. "In Command" (Radio Edit) — 3:44
2. "In Command" (Extended Version) — 5:23
- CD maxi-single, Europe (1993)
1. "In Command" (Radio Edit) — 3:44
2. "In Command" (Extended Version) — 5:23
3. "In Command" (Nice & Stoned Club Dub) — 4:36
4. "In Command" (Indee's H-Way Judgement Mix) — 5:54
- CD maxi-single, Australia (1993)
1. "In Command" (Radio Edit) — 3:44
2. "In Command" (Extended Version) — 5:23
3. "In Command" (Nice & Stones Club Dub) — 4:36
4. "In Command" (Indee's H-Way Judgement Mix) — 5:54
- CD maxi-single, UK & Europe (1994)
1. "In Command" (Remix Radio Edit) — 4:19
2. "In Command" (Original Radio Edit) — 3:44
3. "In Command" (Seize Command Mix) — 6:22
4. "In Command" (Deuce Dub) — 6:28
5. "In Command" (Nice & Stones Club Dub) — 4:24
6. "In Command" (Extended Version) — 5:54
7. "In Command" (Indee's H-Way Judgement Mix) — 5:54

== Charts ==
=== Weekly charts ===
Chart (1993–1994)	Peak position
Europe (Eurochart Hot 100)	39
Finland (Suomen virallinen lista)	4
Israel (Israeli Singles Chart)	3
Sweden (Sverigetopplistan)	1
UK Singles (Official Charts)	87
UK Club Chart (Music Week)	93

=== Year-end charts ===
Chart (1993)	Position
Sweden (Topplistan)	27

Chart (1994)	Position
Sweden (Topplistan)	82

== Certifications ==
Region	Certification	Certified units/sales
Sweden (GLF)	Gold	25,000^{^}
^{^} Shipments figures based on certification alone.
