= Got to Get =

1989 single by Rob'n'Raz

Single by Rob'n'Raz featuring Leila K

from the album Rob'n'Raz feat. Leila K
- B-side: "Fonky Beats for Your Mind"
- Released: 1989
- Genre: Pop-rap; house
- Length: 4:30
- Label: Telegram; Arista
- Songwriters: Rob'n'Raz; Leila K; MC II Fresh
- Producer: Rob'n'Raz

Rob'n'Raz featuring Leila K singles chronology
"Got to Get" (1989)	"Rok the Nation" (1990)

Music video
- "Got to Get" on YouTube

"Got to Get" is a song by Swedish duo Rob'n'Raz featuring singer-songwriter and rapper Leila K. Released in 1989 by Telegram and Arista Records as her debut single, it also served as the lead single from their only album together, Rob'n'Raz featuring Leila K (1990). The song was written by Leila K with MC II Fresh and became successful in Europe, reaching the top 10 in at least nine countries, including the United Kingdom, where it peaked at number eight in January 1990. The song also charted in the United States, Canada and Australia. Two different music videos were made to accompany it; the European version was directed by Paul Boyd.

== Background ==
Leila K was discovered by electronic dance music duo Rob'n'Raz when singing in a music contest. They liked her music and offered her a recording contract in 1988. With them she would get her first hit the following year with "Got to Get". It was first recorded within the UK as a pre-production demo by Pete Towns of P&P Productions. In 1990, the album Rob'n'Raz featuring Leila K was released, featuring "Got to Get".

== Critical reception ==
A reviewer from Billboard magazine described the song as "explosive" and "an infectious club-inspired stomper". The magazine's Bill Coleman stated that "as infectious, house-inflected pop/rap goes, this track wins on its own." Ernest Hardy from Cashbox wrote, "The inevitable Neneh Cherry clone arrives with a swiftness that in itself is awe-inspiring. Vocally, this well could be Miss Cherry. There’s the oh-so-slight hint of a rasp, coupled with sass and lots of ’tude." Mick Mercer from Melody Maker complimented it as a "little fun bundle".

Pan-European magazine Music & Media commented, "The world will soon wake up to this 17-year-old female rapper from Gothenburg who can easily compete with artists like Neneh Cherry or the Cookie Crew." NME said, "God knows who Rob 'n' Raz are, but Leila K is a Swedish black woman who sounds like Neneh Cherry! Well, shipmates! Blow me down if that ain't a merry coincidence! This record is jaunty but unremarkable, like a pigeon." Taylor Dayne, reviewing the song for Number One, remarked that "this girl sounds exactly like Neneh Cherry. So does the production." She also declared it as "a happening record and everything and you can dance to it".

== Chart performance ==
"Got to Get" was a number-one hit in Iceland, peaked at number two in the Netherlands, and reached number three in Austria, Switzerland and West Germany. In the United Kingdom, it reached its peak of number eight on the UK Singles Chart in January 1990. It was a top-10 hit in Belgium, Finland, Luxembourg, Norway and in Leila K's native Sweden. Additionally, "Got to Get" entered the top 20 in both Denmark and Ireland, as well as on the Eurochart Hot 100, where it reached number 11 in March 1990. Outside Europe, the single peaked at numbers 48 and 46 on the US Billboard Hot 100 and Cash Box Top 100, and number 57 in Australia, where it spent a total of 20 weeks within the top 100. "Got to Get" also entered the top 10 on the Canadian RPM Dance chart. In West Asia, it became a successful top-5 hit in Israel, peaking at number five on 28 January 1990.

== Music video ==
There were produced two different music videos to promote the single. The European version was directed by Scottish director Paul Boyd. In the video, Leila K and the guys from Rob'n'Raz performs with dancers and players on a basketball court surrounded by a white picket fence.

Personnel

- David Thomas – Stylist
- Robert Dexter – Assistant stylist

== Track listings ==
- 7-inch vinyl, Scandinavia (1989)

A. "Got to Get" (Radio Edit) — 4:30
B. "Got to Get" (Instrumental) — 4:16

- 12-inch vinyl, Scandinavia (1989)

A. "Got to Get" (Club Version) — 5:15
B1. "Got to Get" (Radio Edit) — 4:30
B2. "Got to Get" (Instrumental) — 4:16
B3. "Fonky Beats for Your Mind" — 1:55

- CD single (Remixes), UK & Europe (1989)
1. "Got to Get" (Nordik Beat Mix) — 5:34
2. "Got to Get" (Stone's Nordik Swing Theory) — 4:42
- CD maxi-single, UK & Europe (1989)
1. "Got to Get" (Extended Mix) — 4:32
2. "Got to Get" (Motor City Mix) — 5:20
3. "Got to Get" (Stone's Nordik Swing Theory) — 4:44
4. "Got to Get" (Hitman's Home Mix) — 5:00

== Charts ==
=== Weekly charts ===
Chart (1989–1990)	Peak position
Australia (ARIA)	57
Austria (Ö3 Austria Top 40)	3
Belgium (Ultratop 50 Flanders)	5
Canada Dance/Urban (RPM)	5
Denmark (IFPI)	14
Europe (Eurochart Hot 100)	11
Finland (Suomen virallinen lista)	10
Iceland (Íslenski Listinn)	1
Ireland (IRMA)	14
Israel (Israeli Singles Chart)	5
Luxembourg (Radio Luxembourg)	5
Netherlands (Dutch Top 40)	2
Netherlands (Single Top 100)	2
Norway (VG-lista)	4
Quebec (ADISQ)	27
Sweden (Sverigetopplistan)	10
Sweden (Trackslistan)	9
Switzerland (Schweizer Hitparade)	3
UK Singles (Official Charts)	8
US Billboard Hot 100	48
US 12-inch Singles Sales (Billboard)	9
US Dance Club Play (Billboard)	8
US Cash Box Top 100	46
West Germany (GfK)	3

=== Year-end charts ===
Chart (1990)	Position
Austria (Ö3 Austria Top 40)	24
Belgium (Ultratop)	56
Canada Dance/Urban (RPM)	36
Europe (Eurochart Hot 100)	45
Germany (Media Control)	37
Netherlands (Dutch Top 40)	27
Netherlands (Single Top 100)	45
Switzerland (Schweizer Hitparade)	27

== Release history ==
Region	Date	Format(s)	Label(s)	Ref.
Sweden	1989	—N/a	Telegram	
United Kingdom	30 October 1989	7-inch vinyl; 12-inch vinyl; CD	Telegram; Arista	
Australia	26 February 1990	7-inch vinyl; 12-inch vinyl	Arista	
Japan	21 March 1990	Mini-CD	Arista	
Australia	2 April 1990	Cassette	Arista	
