= Dr. Feelgood (Cool James and Black Teacher song) =

Single by Cool James & Black Teacher

from the album Zooming You
- Released: 1994
- Genre: Eurodance
- Label: Stockholm Records
- Songwriter(s): Dandu; Masena; Reiniz
- Producer(s): Cool James

Cool James & Black Teacher singles chronology
"Let's Stay Together" (1993)	"Dr. Feelgood" (1994)	"Godfather" (1994)

Music video
- "Dr. Feelgood" on YouTube

"Dr. Feelgood" is a song by Swedish Eurodance group Cool James & Black Teacher. It was released in 1994 as the lead single from their second album, Zooming You (1994). The song features vocals by singer Anne Haavisto and was a huge hit in Sweden, peaking at number two on the Swedish singles chart. It became the 21st bestselling single of 1994 there.

== Critical reception ==
Pan-European magazine Music & Media commented, "Down at the doctors teenagers get cured with a dose of Euro dance that isn't that much different from the recipe as served by fellow countryman Dr. Alban."

== Track listing ==
CD maxi-single
No.	Title	Length
1.	"Dr Feelgood (7" Version)"	3:48
2.	"Dr Feelgood (Doctor Statikk Mix)"	5:55
3.	"Dr Feelgood (S.F.C. Remix)"	4:22
4.	"Dr Feelgood (Bass Nation Razormix)"	5:01
5.	"Dr Feelgood (Flash Da Style Mix)"	6:23

CD single
No.	Title	Length
1.	"Dr Feelgood"	3:48
2.	"Again For Love"	4:10

Remixes by Statikk And Kliford, CD maxi-single
No.	Title	Length
1.	"Dr Feelgood (Doctor Statikk Mix)"	5:57
2.	"Dr Feelgood (Statikk Feel Mix)"	4:50
3.	"Dr Feelgood (Flash Da Style Mix)"	6:23

"Doctor Feelgood", CD single
No.	Title	Length
1.	"Doctor Feelgood (Radio Edit)"	3:26
2.	"Doctor Feelgood (Extended)"	5:48

"Doctor Feelgood", CD maxi-single
No.	Title	Length
1.	"Doctor Feelgood (Radio Edit)"	3:26
2.	"Doctor Feelgood (Extended)"	5:48
3.	"Doctor Feelgood (Instrumental)"	3:20
4.	"Doctor Feelgood (A Cappella)"	1:33

== Charts ==
Chart (1994)	Peak position
Finland (IFPI)	16
Sweden (Sverigetopplistan)	2
