= Antiloop =

Swedish techno music duo

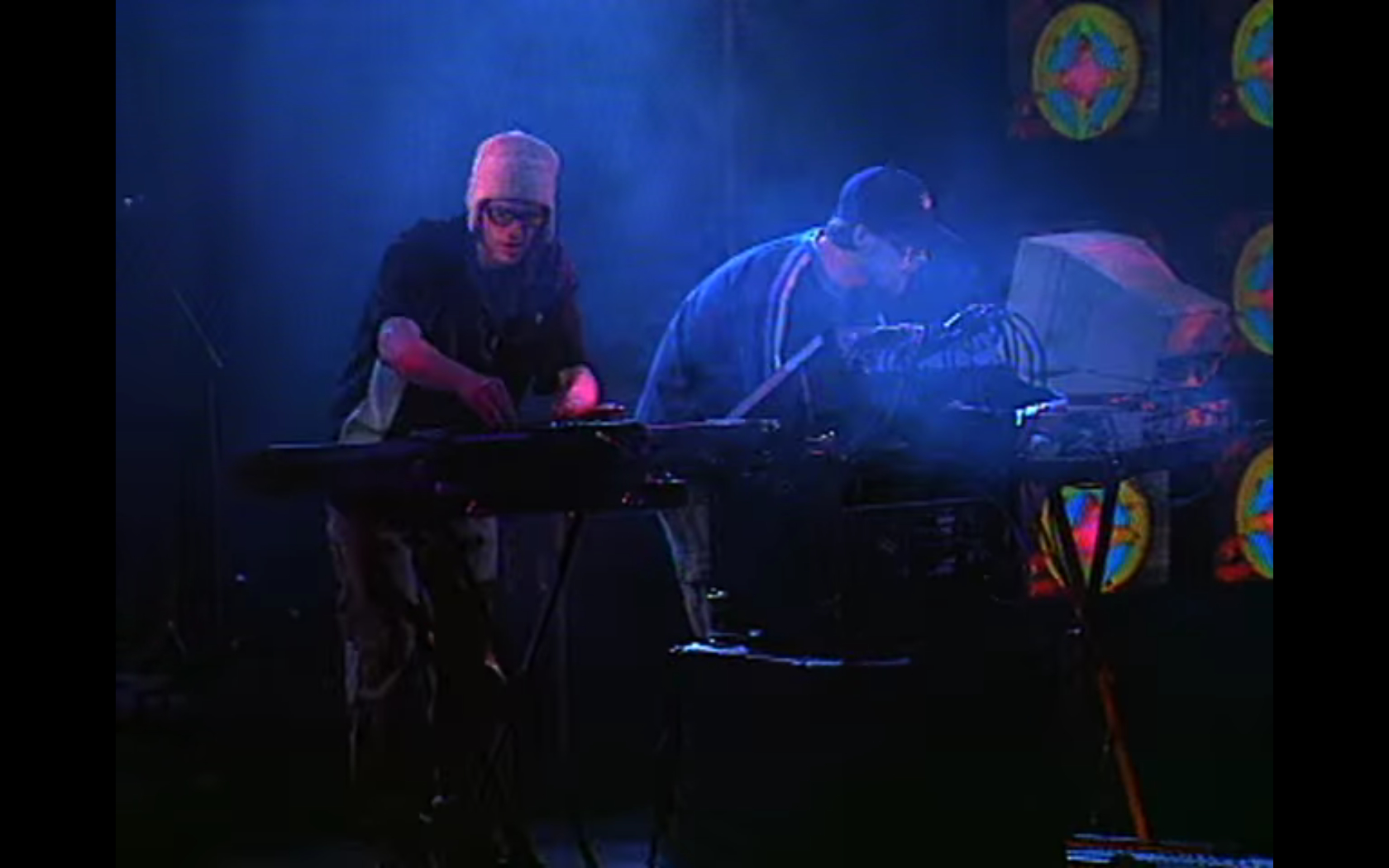
- Antiloop live at Rockbjörnen 1998

Background information
- Also known as: The Buckwheat Rebels, Face
- Origin: Lidingö, Stockholm, Sweden
- Genre: Electronic dance
- Years active: 1994–2002
- Labels: Stockholm Records, Fluid Records
- Past members: David Westerlund; Robin Söderman

Antiloop were a Swedish electronic dance music duo, formed in Lidingö in 1994 by David Westerlund and Robin Söderman. They won two Swedish Grammis Awards and six Swedish Dance Music Awards.

== Biography ==
=== Early career (1974–1994) ===
Robin Staffan Mark Söderman (born 22 January 1974) and David Olof Westerlund (born 8 July 1977) both grew up in Lidingö in Stockholm, Sweden. Robin's father and uncle were musicians and helped grow his interest.. David started playing the synth at an age of four and later played in a big band jazz at youth age. Söderman started a band and invited his childhood friend Westerlund, along with some other that he knew. The other members left the band and it was only Westerlund and Söderman left. They began to play in nightclubs as DJs and eventually decided to make their own music.

=== Antiloop (1994–2002) ===
Antiloop was formed in 1994. The name comes both from the animal antelope, which in Swedish is spelled: "Antilop", and the music element loop.

A third member, the dancer Maxim, was also member of the band, but he left early.

Antiloop debuted in 1995 with the EP: N.S.F.M.C (Not Suitable For Mass Consumption). In 1997, they released their debut album LP. Five singles were released from the album, which all peaked at under 45 in the Swedish chart. A year later they released the remix album Remixed, including the single "Believe". Antiloop released their second and final studio album in 2000, Fastlane People. The song "Catch Me" on the album features the Swedish rapper Timbuktu on vocals. The songs "Only U" and "Let Your Body Free" appear in the film Lilja 4-ever (2002) by Lukas Moodysson. In 2002 they released a compilation album titled At The Rebel's Room that includes two discs; one containing their most popular songs, and another made of remixes of their songs by other artists. Antiloop produced several remixes for the Scandinavian group Aqua, including one for the Doctor Jones CD single. They have released songs and remixes under the aliases Face and The Buckwheat Rebels.

Antiloop disbanded in 2002 with their website eventually expiring shortly after. In 2005, David Westerlund began producing music by himself under the name "David West".

== Discography ==
=== Studio albums ===
| Title | Details | Peak chart positions | | Sales | Certifications |
| Title | Details | SWE | FIN | Sales | Certifications |
|---|---|---|---|---|---|
| LP | Released: June 1997; Label: Stockholm Records, Fluid Records; Formats: CD, Digital download | 8 | — | SWE: 60,000 | GLF: Gold |
| Fastlane People | Released: 24 May 2000; Label: Stockholm Records; Formats: CD, Digital download | 8 | 19 | | |
"—" denotes a recording that did not chart or was not released in that territory.

=== Extended plays ===
| Title | Details | Peak chart positions |
| Title | Details | SWE |
|---|---|---|
| N.S.F.M.C (Not Suitable For Mass Consumption) | Released: May 1995; Label: Fluid Records; Formats: CD, LP, Digital download | 33 |

=== Remix albums ===
| Title | Details | Peak chart positions | Sales |
| Title | Details | SWE | Sales |
|---|---|---|---|
| Remixed | Released: November 1998; Label: Stockholm Records, Fluid Records; Formats: CD, Digital download | 33 | SWE: 25,000 |

=== Compilation albums ===
| Title | Details |
| At the Rebel's Room | Released: 2002; Label: Stockholm Records; Formats: CD, Digital download |

=== Singles ===
| Title | Year | Peak chart positions | | | | | | Certifications | Album |
| Title | Year | SWE | BEL(Vl) | FIN | FRA | NED | NOR | Certifications | Album |
|---|---|---|---|---|---|---|---|---|---|
| "Purpose in Life" | 1996 | 45 | — | — | — | — | — | | LP |
| "In My Mind" | 1997 | 6 | 34 | 9 | 13 | 23 | 4 | GLF: Gold; SNEP: Gold; IFPI Norway: Gold | LP |
| "I Love You (Beauty and the Beast)" | 1997 | 42 | — | 15 | — | — | — | | LP |
| "Nowhere to Hide" | 1997 | 42 | 38 | — | 52 | 72 | — | | LP |
| "Trespasser" | 1998 | 35 | — | — | — | — | — | | LP |
| "Believe" | 1998 | 5 | — | — | — | — | 5 | GLF: Platinum | Remixed |
| "Start Rockin'" | 2000 | 4 | — | 11 | — | — | 16 | GLF: Gold | Fastlane People |
| "Only U" | 2000 | 29 | — | — | — | — | — | | Fastlane People |
| "Catch Me" (featuring Timbuktu) | 2000 | — | — | — | — | — | — | | Fastlane People |
"—" denotes a recording that did not chart or was not released in that territory.

== Awards ==
=== Swedish Grammis Awards ===
| Year | Nominee / work | Award | Result |
|---|---|---|---|
| 1998 | LP | Årets modern dans (The year's best contemporary dance) | Won |
| 2001 | Fastlane People | Årets Klubb/Dans (The year's best club/Dance) | Won |

=== Swedish Dance Music Awards ===
| Year | Nominee / work | Award | Result |
|---|---|---|---|
| 1997 | Antiloop | Best House/Techno Act | Won |
| 1998 | Antiloop | Best Modern Dance | Won |
| 1998 | Antiloop | Best House/Techno Act | Won |
| 1998 | LP | Best Dance Album | Won |
| 1998 | "In My Mind" | Best Dance Single | Won |
| 1998 | Antiloop | Best Dance Artist/Group | Won |
