= Swahili Nation =

Swedish musical group

Swahili Nation were Swedish R&B hip hop group. The group was started in the 1990s by Kenyan brothers Andrew Muturi and Robert Muturi and the Tanzanian Cool James. In 1992, after Cool James went solo, the group was joined by the Ugandans Ken Kayongo and Charlie "King" Todwong.

Nigerian-born Dr. Alban signed them to his Sweden-based Dr Records in 1996. Singer Wayne "Tatz" Beckford from London joined the group. They produced the singles "Malaika", "Nyama", and "Hakuna Matata", for which they received a nomination to Channel O Music Awards in South Africa.

Through the popularity of "Hakuna Matata" in East Africa, Swahili Nation had a big influence on the use of Swahili language in R&B and hip hop.
