= Jet Boy, Jet Girl =

Single by Elton Motello

from the album Victim of Time
- A-side: "Pogo Pogo"
- Released: October 1977
- Genre: Punk rock, pop punk
- Label: EMI-Bovema/NEGRAM, Lightnin, Vogue; Edge
- Songwriter: Alan Ward
- Producer: Alan Ward

Elton Motello singles chronology
"Jet Boy, Jet Girl" (1977)	"I Am the Marshall" (1978)

Music video
- "Jet Boy Jet Girl" on YouTube

"Jet Boy, Jet Girl" is a 1977 song by Elton Motello about a 15-year-old boy's sexual relationship with an older man, who then rejects him for a girl.

== Background ==
Alan Ward had toured Belgium with Bastard. Through his connections there, he had his new moniker, Elton Motello, debut on the Belgian label Pinball with the single "Jet Boy, Jet Girl" in 1977. The song was backed by session musicians Mike Butcher (guitar), John Valcke (bass), and Bob Dartsch (drums), instead of Elton Motello's regular musicians. That exact same backing track was simultaneously used by Belgian artist Plastic Bertrand on his internationally successful hit single "Ça plane pour moi". Since then, "Jet Boy, Jet Girl" has sometimes been wrongly thought to be a cover of "Ça plane pour moi", with new lyrics over the same backing track, but the truth is that the two songs were simultaneous adaptations of the same backing track.

While Bertrand's single was an international hit, Motello's single in English made little impact, except in Australia, where it was released on the RCA label and hit #33 on the National Top Forty (and regionally in Melbourne at #11 and in Sydney, at #10). Also in Australia, "Jet Boy, Jet Girl" has appeared in a television commercial featuring the chorus and not the sexual lyrics.

== United States censorship ==
In 1989, the American Federal Communications Commission (FCC), acting on a complaint from activist Jack Thompson, fined radio station WIOD $10,000 for allowing talk host Neil Rogers to play the song. Thompson considered the song obscene, and the FCC agreed with him.

== Charts ==
Chart (1978)	Peak position
Australia (Kent Music Report)	33

== Personnel ==
Elton Motello

- Alan Ward – vocals
- Jet Staxx/Mike Butcher – guitar
- John Valke – bass
- Bob Dartch – drums

== Cover versions ==
Like "Ça plane pour moi", the song has been covered by numerous bands and artists, including The Damned, FIDLAR, Captain Sensible & the Softies, Chron Gen, Spencer P. Jones and Crocodiles. The New York City punk rock band The Breaking Sounds cover the song as well with the lyrics being sung in both Finnish and English. The original version received renewed attention when it was included on John Waters' 2007 compilation CD A Date with John Waters. Canadian recording artist and drag queen Mina Mercury also recorded the song in 2019. In 2024, the song was included in the sound track for the Cary Grant documentary “Archie” (backgrounding the 14 year old Grant’s arrival in New York City with a vaudeville troupe).
