= I Wanna Dance (Melodie MC song) =

Single by Melodie MC

from the album Northland Wonderland
- B-side: "Remix"
- Released: 1993
- Studio: Sidelake Studios
- Genre: Eurodance
- Length: 4:34 (radio version)
- Label: Sidelake Productions; Virgin
- Songwriter: Melodie MC
- Producer: Statikk

Melodie MC singles chronology
"Dum Da Dum" (1993)	"I Wanna Dance" (1993)	"Give It Up! (For the Melody)" (1994)

Music video
- "I Wanna Dance" on YouTube

"I Wanna Dance" is a song by Swedish recording artist Melodie MC, released in 1993 by Sidelake Productions and Virgin Records as the fourth single from his debut album, Northland Wonderland (1993). It is written by the artist and features vocals by singer Lotta Sundgren. The song peaked at number six in Sweden and number eight in the Netherlands. Additionally, it was a top-30 hit in Belgium, while it reached number 72 on the Eurochart Hot 100. Outside Europe, "I Wanna Dance" became a hit in Australia, peaking at number 21. Pan-European magazine Music & Media wrote in their review of the song in November 1993, "Sequencers and buzzing synths pave the way for this Swedish rapper. who gives us exactly what both his name and the song title promise: melodic dance."

== Track listing ==
- 12", Sweden (1993)
1. "I Wanna Dance" (X-10-Ded Version) – 6:35
2. "I Wanna Dance" (Radio Version) – 4:34
3. "I Wanna Dance" (Statikk Vs Tom Droid Version) – 6:43
- CD single, Sweden (1993)
1. "I Wanna Dance" (Radio) – 4:34
2. "I Wanna Dance" (X-10-DED) – 6:35
- CD maxi, Europe (1993)
1. "I Wanna Dance" (Radio Version) – 4:34
2. "I Wanna Dance" (X-10-DED Version) – 6:35
3. "I Wanna Dance" (Statikk Vs. Tom Droid) – 6:46

== Charts ==
=== Weekly charts ===
Chart (1993–1994)	Peak position
Australia (ARIA)	21
Belgium (Ultratop 50 Flanders)	27
Europe (Eurochart Hot 100)	72
Netherlands (Dutch Top 40)	8
Netherlands (Single Top 100)	10
Sweden (Sverigetopplistan)	6

=== Year-end charts ===
Chart (1993)	Position
Sweden (Topplistan)	29

Chart (1994)	Position
Netherlands (Dutch Top 40)	86
