= Manic Panic (album) =

Studio album by Leila K
- Released: June 1996
- Genre: Eurodance
- Label: Mega Records MRCD 3305
- Producer: Denniz PoP; Max Martin; Zenpire vs. Mohawk; Kristian Lundin; Douglas Carr; David Kreuger; Per Magnusson; John Amatiello

Leila K chronology
Carousel (1993)	Manic Panic (1996)	Leila K's Greatest Tracks (2003)

Singles from Manic Panic
- 1. "Electric" Released: 1995; 2. "C'Mon Now" Released: 1996; 3. "Rude Boy" Released: 1996; 4. "Blacklisted" Released: 1996

Manic Panic is an album released in 1996 by Swedish singer Leila K via Mega Records.

== Track listing ==
No.	Title	Writer(s)	Producer(s)	Length
1.	"C'Mon Now"	Vinnie Vincent; Gene Simmons; Herbie Crichlow; Max Martin; Dag Volle	Denniz PoP; Martin	3:04
2.	"Blacklisted"	Daniel Wahlgren; Martin; Volle	Denniz PoP; Martin	3:55
3.	"Dynamite"	Julius Agami; David Kreuger; Per Magnusson; Douglas Carr	Carr; Kreuger; Magnusson	3:19
4.	"It's 2 Die 4"	Leila El-Khalifi; Agami; Maurice Hawkesworth; Anthony Zenpire	Zenpire vs. Mohawk	4:01
5.	"Electric"	El-Khalifi; Crichlow; Martin; Volle; Edward Chrisolm; Chris Barbosa	Denniz PoP; Martin	3:35
6.	"Murderer"	Wahlgren; Martin; Kristian Lundin	Denniz PoP; Martin; Lundin	3:13
7.	"Rude Boy" (featuring Papa Dee)	El-Khalifi; Wahlgren; Crichlow; Martin; Volle	Denniz PoP; Martin	3:11
8.	"Cue Club"	El-Khalifi; Agami; Hawkesworth; Zenpire	Zenpire vs. Mohawk	3:28
9.	"I'm Coming to You"	El-Khalifi; Agami; Hawkesworth; Zenpire	Zenpire vs. Mohawk	4:09
10.	"C'Mon Now" (Amadin remix)	Vincent; Simmons; Crichlow; Martin; Volle	Lundin; John Amatiello	5:02

== Charts ==
Chart (1996)	Peak position
Finnish Albums (Suomen virallinen lista)	4
Swedish Albums (Sverigetopplistan)	17

== Sales and certifications ==
Certifications for Manic Panic
Region	Certification	Certified units/sales
Finland (Musiikkituottajat)	Gold	20,319
