= Dum Da Dum =

Single by Melodie MC

from the album Northland Wonderland
- B-side: "Remix"
- Released: 1993
- Studio: Sidelake Studios
- Genre: Eurodance
- Length: 4:26 (radio version)
- Label: Sidelake Productions; Virgin
- Songwriter: Melodie MC
- Producer: Statikk

Melodie MC singles chronology
"Take Me Away" (1992)	"Dum Da Dum" (1993)	"I Wanna Dance" (1993)

Music video
- "Dum Da Dum" on YouTube

"Dum Da Dum" is a song by Swedish recording artist Melodie MC (a.k.a. Kent Lövgren), released in 1993 by Sidelake Productions and Virgin Records as the third single from his debut album, Northland Wonderland (1993). The song is written by Lövgren and features female vocals by Mayomi (a.k.a. Pia Sjöberg). It was produced by Swedish producer Statikk and contains a sample from "Feel That Beat" by 2 Static. "Dum Da Dum" was a success on the singles charts in Europe and Australia, remaining the artist's most successful single. It was also nominated in the category for Best Swedish Dance Track 1993 at the Swedish Dance Music Awards 1994. In 2009, a new version of "Dum Da Dum" was released, remixed by Eric S (a.k.a. Erik Svensson).

== Critical reception ==
Pan-European magazine Music & Media wrote in their review of Northland Wonderland, "Melodie MC's act is based on sequencers, buzzing synths, pop melodies and raps by the master of ceremony himself, assisted by female backing singers. "Move your ass permanently" is the bottom line of his rhymes. The hits 'I Wanna Dance' and 'Dum Da Dum' give a good idea of this happy go lucky dance album." James Hamilton from Music Week's RM Dance Update described it as a "commercial cornily rapped Swedish Euro-hit" in his weekly dance column.

== Chart performance ==
"Dum Da Dum" was a hit on both the European and Australian continent, becoming a number-two hit in Greece, a number-three hit in Spain, and a number-four hit in the Netherlands for two weeks. In Finland and Australia, it was a top-5 hit. It stayed for two weeks at number five on the Australian ARIA Top 50 singles chart and for 18 weeks within the chart, being certified gold with a sale of 35,000 units. In Melodie MC's native Sweden, the song peaked at number seven on Sverigetopplistan on 28 July 1993, after entering at number 25 and staying inside the chart for 23 consecutive weeks.

In North America, "Dum Da Dum" was a success on the Canadian RPM Dance/Urban chart, peaking at number eight in July 1994. Additionally, the song was a top-20 hit in Belgium (18), Denmark (16) and Israel (13), as well as on the Eurochart Hot 100, where it peaked at number 13. It debuted on the chart at number 91 on 7 August 1993, after charting in Sweden. The song did not chart on the UK Singles Chart, but reached number 74 on the UK Club Chart.

== Track listing ==
- 12", Sweden (1993)
1. "Dum Da Dum" (Club Version) — 6:10
2. "Dum Da Dum" (Radio Version) — 4:23
3. "Dum Da Dum" (Alternative Club by N Brigade) — 5:01
- CD single, Europe (1993)
1. "Dum Da Dum" (Radio Version) — 4:41
2. "Dum Da Dum" (Club Version) — 6:15
- CD maxi, Europe (1993)
1. "Dum Da Dum" (Radio Version) — 4:41
2. "Dum Da Dum" (Club Version) — 6:15
3. "Dum Da Dum" (Alternative Club by N Brigade) — 6:51
4. "Feel Your Body Movin' 93" (Toms Transquality Mix) — 6:03

== Charts ==
=== Weekly charts ===
Chart (1993–1994)	Peak position
Australia (ARIA)	5
Belgium (Ultratop 50 Flanders)	18
Canada Dance/Urban (RPM)	8
Europe (Eurochart Hot 100)	13
Finland (IFPI)	5
Greece (Pop + Rock)	2
Israel (Israeli Singles Chart)	13
Netherlands (Dutch Top 40)	4
Netherlands (Single Top 100)	4
Spain (AFYVE)	3
Sweden (Sverigetopplistan)	7
UK Club Chart (Music Week)	74

=== Year-end charts ===
Chart (1993)	Position
Netherlands (Dutch Top 40)	37
Netherlands (Single Top 100)	59
Sweden (Topplistan)	20

Chart (1994)	Position
Australia (ARIA)	33

== Certifications ==
Region	Certification	Certified units/sales
Australia (ARIA)	Gold	35,000^{‡}
^{‡} Sales+streaming figures based on certification alone.
