= Open Sesame (Leila K song) =

1992 single by Leila K

Single by Leila K

from the album Carousel
- B-side: "Sesame Music"
- Released: 23 October 1992
- Genre: House; ragga; rave
- Length: 3:24
- Label: Coma
- Songwriters: Denniz PoP; Douglas Carr; Deep Fried
- Producers: Denniz PoP; Douglas Carr

Leila K singles chronology
"Rok the Nation" (1990)	"Open Sesame" (1992)	"Ça Plane Pour Moi" (1993)

Music video
- "Open Sesame" on YouTube

"Open Sesame" is a song by Swedish Eurodance artist Leila K, released in October 1992 by Coma label as the lead single from the artist's second album, Carousel (1993). Co-written and co-produced by Denniz PoP, the song was a huge success in many European countries in 1993. It reached number-one in Belgium and peaked within the top 10 in at least nine other countries. The accompanying music video was directed by Matt Broadley and filmed in London, depicting Leila K as the Queen of Sheba. In 1999, the song was released in a new remix as "Open Sesame '99". Dutch singer Daisy Dee released a cover in 2000, which reached number 78 in Germany.

== Critical reception ==
In his weekly UK chart commentary, James Masterton felt that "this high-powered commercial rap coupling a rave beat with a ragga style delivery may just revive her career." Simon Price from Melody Maker complimented it as a "brilliant" hit, where "she reinvented herself as the Ragga Queen of Sheba (did you see that video?), nasally imploring us to "Jump around if you mind can work". Um. Boing! Boing!" Andy Beevers from Music Week gave the song a score of four out of five, writing, "This commercial Swedish house track combines a Felix-style tune and reggae toasting. The UK release features a more adventurous remix by Felix himself." Mark Sutherland from Smash Hits gave it three out of five, saying, "Ragamuffin rapping in a Swedish accent may sound like a thoroughly appalling notion, but Ms K goes for it with such pzazz that you soon come round to the idea. This girl has more energy than Linford Christie after a Lucozade binge, and this record is a real Sesame treat."

== Chart performance ==
"Open Sesame" was successful on the charts across Europe. It reached number one for one week in Belgium (Flanders), with a total of 16 weeks at the Ultratop 50 chart, and number two in the Netherlands. In the latter, the song held the next best chart position for several weeks, being held off the top spot by 2 Unlimited's "No Limit". It entered the top 10 also in Austria (5), Denmark (7), Finland (9), Germany (5), Italy (5), Portugal (7), Spain (6) and Switzerland (5).

In the United Kingdom, the single reached number 23 on the UK Singles Chart in its second week on the chart, on 24 January 1993, but was more successful on the UK Dance Singles chart by Music Week, peaking at number ten the same month. In Leila K's native Sweden, it only reached number 21, staying at Sverigetopplistan for three weeks. On the Eurochart Hot 100, it peaked at number six in April 1993, in its eleventh week on the chart, while peaking at numbers 12 and 18 at the European Dance Radio Chart and the Record Mirror Club Chart, respectively. Outside Europe, "Open Sesame" became a hit in West Asia, peaking at number 12 in Israel on 15 December 1992.

The single earned a gold record in the Netherlands with a sale of 50,000 units.

== Music video ==
The accompanying music video for "Open Sesame" was directed by Swedish-based director Matt Broadley and filmed in Notting Hill, London. It depicts Leila K as the Queen of Sheba and received heavy rotation on MTV Europe in March 1993. The video was later made available on Mega Records' official YouTube channel in 2011 and had generated almost eight million views as of January 2026.

== Track listings ==
- 12-inch, UK and Europe (1992)

A1: "Open Sesame" (long version)
A2: "Open Sesame" (short version)
AA1: "Open Sesame" (Felix remix)
AA2: "Open Sesame" (Bouncing Baby mix)

- CD maxi, Europe (1992)
1. "Open Sesame" (radio edit) – 3:24
2. "Open Sesame" (long version) – 8:43
3. "Open Sesame" (instrumental) – 4:00
- CD maxi – Remixes, Scandinavia (1992)
1. "Open Sesame" (Bouncing Baby mix) - 3:39
2. "Open Sesame" (Felix remix) – 5:22
3. "Sesame Music" – 9:16
- CD maxi - Final Exit Remix, Germany (1993)
1. "Open Sesame" (Final Exit remix) – 5:34
2. "Open Sesame" (Last Exit mix) – 4:22
3. "Open Sesame" (Plutonic mix) – 10:54
- CD maxi, Scandinavia (1999)
1. "Open Sesame '99" (X-2000 radio) – 3:43
2. "Open Sesame '99" (X-2000 extended) – 6:29
3. "Open Sesame '99" (Fix & Trix extended) – 7:50
4. "Open Sesame '99" (Soundfreak remix) – 3:48
5. "Open Sesame '99" (Sezams Uber Alles remix) – 5:28
6. "Open Sesame '99" (Fatz-Jr remix) – 4:59
7. "Open Sesame" (original full length version) – 8:49

== Charts ==
=== Weekly charts ===
Chart (1992–1993)	Peak position
Austria (Ö3 Austria Top 40)	5
Belgium (Ultratop 50 Flanders)	1
Denmark (IFPI)	7
Europe (Eurochart Hot 100)	6
Europe (European Dance Radio)	12
Finland (Suomen virallinen lista)	9
Germany (GfK)	5
Ireland (IRMA)	13
Israel (Israeli Singles Chart)	12
Italy (Musica e dischi)	5
Netherlands (Dutch Top 40)	2
Netherlands (Single Top 100)	2
Portugal (AFP)	7
Spain (AFYVE)	6
Sweden (Sverigetopplistan)	21
Switzerland (Schweizer Hitparade)	5
UK Singles (Official Charts)	23
UK Dance (Music Week)	10
UK Club Chart (Music Week)	18

=== Year-end charts ===
Chart (1993)	Position
Belgium (Ultratop 50 Flanders)	14
Europe (Eurochart Hot 100)	25
Germany (Media Control)	19
Netherlands (Dutch Top 40)	7
Netherlands (Single Top 100)	14

=== Decade-end charts ===
Chart (1990–1999)	Rank
Netherlands (Dutch Top 40)	81

== Sales and certifications ==
Certifications for "Open Sesame"
Region	Certification	Certified units/sales
Netherlands (NVPI)	Gold	50,000^{^}
^{^} Shipments figures based on certification alone.

== Release history ==
Region	Date	Format(s)	Label(s)	Ref.
Europe	23 October 1992	—N/a	Coma	
United Kingdom	11 January 1993	7-inch vinyl; 12-inch vinyl; CD; cassette	Polydor	
