= Ça plane pour moi =

1977 single by Plastic Bertrand

Single by Plastic Bertrand

from the album An 1
- B-side: "Pogo Pogo"
- Released: 1978
- Genre: Punk rock; pop-punk
- Length: 2:57
- Label: RKM (Belgium); Vogue (France)
- Songwriters: Lou Deprijck, music Yvan Lacomblez, lyrics
- Producer: Lou Deprijck

Plastic Bertrand singles chronology
"New Promotion" (1975)	"Ça plane pour moi" (1978)	"Bambino" (1978)

Music video
- "Ça plane pour moi" (TopPop, 1977) on YouTube

"Ça plane pour moi" (French pronunciation: [sa plan puʁ mwa]) is a 1977 song by Belgian musician Plastic Bertrand. The backing music track was first used in the 1977 song "Jet Boy, Jet Girl" by Elton Motello. The four-tone hook is in the style of Beach Boys or Four Seasons.

The song has been covered by many artists, though the original recording was the most successful, reaching No. 8 on the UK Singles Chart in mid-1978. While mainly regarded as a punk rock song, "Ça plane pour moi" has also been described as new wave and as a parody or pastiche of punk rock. The title is a French idiom that is best translated as "this works for me" (literally: "it is gliding for me").

== Controversy surrounding the vocals ==
Producer Lou Deprijck always maintained that he performed the vocals on the original recording, and the question remains controversial. In 2006 the Brussels court of appeal, upholding the decision of a lower court, found that Bertrand was the sole interpreter of the song. In 2010 an expert opinion produced for another case suggested the 1977 vocalist had a Picard accent, like Deprijck's. This did not, however, alter the 2006 ruling, and media statements by Deprijck to the effect that his claim to be the singer had been "recognised by the justice system" were ill-founded. (All of the proceedings between 2006 and 2010 arose from disputes between the record company AMC, which owned the catalogue of Plastic Bertrand's Belgian label RKM, and Deprijck, whom it believed to be making inappropriate use of the material. Deprijck never took the question of who sang what to court himself.)

In an interview prompted by the 2010 episode, Bertrand appeared to admit that he was not the vocalist, but in a follow-up interview the next day he denied this, saying he was being ironic and had been trapped, and threatening legal action. This echoed a similar incident in the 1990s when Bertrand seemed to tell journalist Gilles Verlant that he was not the singer before quickly retracting. Since 2010, Bertrand has consistently said that he is the performer on the original recording, and this remains the position in law.

Deprijck later recorded a version of the song under his own name and claimed that scientific analysis proved his version and the original version were sung by the same voice.

== Background ==
"Ça plane pour moi" was written by Lou Deprijck and Yvan Lacomblez. It was conceived as a comic pastiche of the punk movement. Deprijck explained:

Everything started from the text of Pipou [Lacomblez], which required a very staccato singing, as did, in the United Kingdom, the then fashionable punk singers. I only brought to the text the title, by reference to a song by Michel Delpech, "Tu me fais planer". What we wanted to do was pogo-pogoing, the punk dance. A kind of pastiche. I had three simple chords, A E and D, and musicians that I had chosen to fit the bill. I did not want virtuosos but guys a little bit wild. Once in the studio, with this text and my three chords, I told them "Get by yourselves" and we did it.

The music was recorded by Mike Butcher (guitar), John Valcke (bass guitar) and Bob Dartsch (drums), and the song was released as a B-side to "Pogo-Pogo", which was chosen to launch the solo career of Plastic Bertrand. However, following the success of "Ça plane pour moi", the two sides were switched when the single was re-pressed. The session to record both songs took only two hours.

== Composition ==
"Ça plane pour moi" is a three-chord rock song based on a twelve-bar blues progression that features nonsensical French lyrics with occasional lines in English. Steve Huey of AllMusic describes the song's melody as a "four-note hook which sounds like something straight out of an early Beach Boys or Four Seasons song", accompanied by "... mildly distorted guitars, plus a steadily pumping rhythm section and an old-time rock & roll-style saxophone. Huey also describes the voice as "cartoonish...[staying] in a monotone as he recites all the lyrics."

The song has been described as having "largely nonsensical French lyrics about whiskey-drinking cats and a divan king" and "with words seemingly plucked at random from two entirely different languages." Lou Deprijck has said "... the lyrics are a succession of incoherent things, that a guy, who is stoned, seems to see... it means nothing. It is like if you take LSD. That is exactly the thing you see". The first verse is as follows:

Wham! Bam! Mon chat "Splash" gît sur mon lit.
A bouffé sa langue en buvant dans mon whisky.
Quant à moi: peu dormi, vidé, brimé.
J'ai du dormir dans la gouttière où j'ai un flash.
Hou-hou-hou-hou! En quatre couleurs.

Wham! Bam! My cat, Splash is rolling around on my bed
He swallowed his tongue as he drank all my whisky
As for me: hardly slept, I feel empty and reprimanded
I had to sleep in the gutter where I had a flash of inspiration
Ooh-ooh-ooh-ooh! In four colours.

== Reception ==
The song was praised by Joe Strummer of the Clash: "Plastic Bertrand compressed into that three minutes a bloody good record that will get any comatose person toe-tapping, you know what I mean? By purist rules, it's not allowed to even mention Plastic Bertrand. Yet, this record was probably a lot better than a lot of so-called punk records."

In a review of the song for AllMusic, Steve Huey praised its "simple, inspired stupidity".

== Chart performance ==
"Ça plane pour moi" became a hit in several European countries, peaking at No. 19 in Austria, No. 12 in Sweden, No. 11 in Bertrand's native Belgium, No. 8 in the U.K., No. 6 in West Germany, No. 4 in Ireland, No. 2 in the Netherlands, No. 7 in New Zealand and No. 2 in Australia. It also topped the Swiss charts for one week and the French charts for two consecutive weeks.

In the U.S., the single peaked at No. 47 on the Billboard Hot 100, a strong performance for a French-language song; only "Dominique" by The Singing Nun and "Je t'aime... moi non plus" by Serge Gainsbourg and Jane Birkin had performed as well previously. It also peaked at No. 58 in Canada.

The single sold over 900,000 copies around the world and is regarded as a "punk-new wave-pop classic."

== In popular culture ==
"Ça plane pour moi" is featured in the 1985 film National Lampoon's European Vacation, 2001's Winning London starring Mary-Kate and Ashley Olsen, 1999 Australian-French comedy film Me Myself I, the 2004 comedy Eurotrip, the 2006 Broken Lizard comedy Beerfest, Danny Boyle's 2010 film 127 Hours, the opening scene of 2011's Jackass 3.5, the 2012 film Ruby Sparks, the 2013 film The Wolf of Wall Street, the 2017 film Freak Show and the 2025 film The Family Plan 2.

The song made an appearance in season 4, episode 4 of the Amazon Prime Video television series The Grand Tour, with captions reading "AND BEFORE YOU JUMP ON TWITTER, YES, WE KNOW HE'S BELGIAN", as that episode is actually themed around French cars.

In May 2026 the song was one of the choices of journalist Gary O'Donoghue as the guest for BBC Radio 4's Desert Island Discs.

== Charts ==
=== Weekly charts ===
Chart (1977–1979)	Peak position
Australia (Kent Music Report)	2
Austria (Ö3 Austria Top 40)	19
Belgium (Ultratop 50 Flanders)	11
Canada Top Singles (RPM)	58
France (IFOP)	1
Ireland (IRMA)	4
Netherlands (Dutch Top 40)	2
Netherlands (Single Top 100)	2
New Zealand (Recorded Music NZ)	7
Sweden (Sverigetopplistan)	12
Switzerland (Schweizer Hitparade)	1
UK Singles (Official Charts)	8
US Billboard Hot 100	47
US Cash Box Top 100	57
West Germany (GfK)	6

=== Year-end charts ===
Chart (1977)	Position
France (IFOP)	5

Chart (1978)	Position
Australia (Kent Music Report)	93
Belgium (Ultratop 50 Flanders)	40
Netherlands (Dutch Top 40)	39
Netherlands (Single Top 100)	27
Switzerland (Schweizer Hitparade)	20

Chart (1979)	Position
Australia (Kent Music Report)	26

== Certifications and sales ==
Region	Certification	Certified units/sales
Australia (ARIA)	Gold	50,000^{^}
United Kingdom (BPI)	Silver	200,000^{‡}
^{^} Shipments figures based on certification alone.^{‡} Sales+streaming figures based on certification alone.

== Leila K version ==
"Ça plane pour moi"

Single by Leila K

from the album Carousel
- B-side: "Check The Dan"
- Released: 1993
- Genre: Electropop
- Length: 3:23
- Label: Mega Records; Urban; Polydor
- Songwriters: Lou Deprijck; Yvan Lacomblez
- Producers: Denniz Pop; Douglas Carr

Leila K singles chronology
"Open Sesame" (1992)	"Ça plane pour moi" (1993)	"Slow Motion" (1993)

Music video
- "Ça plane pour moi" on YouTube

Swedish singer and former rapper Leila K covered "Ça plane pour moi" in 1993. It was released by Mega Records as the second single from her first solo album, Carousel (1993). The song was produced by Denniz Pop and Douglas Carr, and achieved moderate success on the charts in many European countries. It peaked at No. 6 in Finland, No. 8 in Austria and Denmark, No. 13 in Germany, No. 16 in Belgium and No. 17 in Switzerland. On the Eurochart Hot 100, "Ça plane pour moi" reached No. 21 in May 1993.

=== Critical reception ===
Simon Price from Melody Maker called the song "a bizarre Moroder-ised version [...] on which she gets away with calling someone 'a fat c***' because it's in French, and adds, unbelievably, 'I am the Queen of the Divan'." Pan-European magazine Music & Media remarked that here, the Plastic Bertrand French-language punk classic had been "re-styled in an electronic dance fashion à la Billy Idol. Très bien!" Head of music Peter Kricek at Czech Republic's Bonton Radio/Prague said that the original from 1978 was known in his country in the communist days, but it was more of an underground thing. He said, "The people here are absolutely mad about Leila's cover, which is a powerplay at our station. Every four hours we play it."

Alan Jones from Music Week gave it three out of five, stating that the song "is transformed into technopunk by the self-proclaimed 'queen of the divan' who, although better known as a rapper is in singing mode here." He also added that the Felix mixes on the CD and 12-inch "take it into trance territory. An odd combination, but likely to do well." Andrew Harrison from Select deemed it a "towering disaster". Sylvia Patterson of Smash Hits praised Leila K's version, giving it five out of five and naming it Best New Single. She declared it "brilliant", saying, "Phew! Ruck and Rool!! (Or whatever it is in French). A delirious synth whirl which hollers and spits and pouts not unlike EMF in a Electrolux spin-cycle without their guitars."

=== Track listing ===
- Maxi single (Urban 861 597-2)
1. "Ça plane pour moi" (Short) – 3:23
2. "Check the Dan" (Short) – 3:55
3. "Ça plane pour moi" (Long) – 5:48
4. "Check the Dan" (Long) – 6:35

=== Charts ===
==== Weekly charts ====
Chart (1993)	Peak position
Austria (Ö3 Austria Top 40)	8
Belgium (Ultratop 50 Flanders)	16
Denmark (IFPI)	8
Europe (Eurochart Hot 100)	21
Europe (European Dance Radio)	4
Finland (Suomen virallinen lista)	6
Germany (GfK)	13
Israel (Israeli Singles Chart)	21
Netherlands (Dutch Top 40)	24
Netherlands (Single Top 100)	31
Sweden (Sverigetopplistan)	25
Switzerland (Schweizer Hitparade)	17
UK Singles (Official Charts)	69
UK Airplay (ERA)	93
UK Dance (Music Week)	38

==== Year-end charts ====
Chart (1993)	Position
Europe (Eurochart Hot 100)	95
Germany (Media Control)	49

== Other cover versions ==
- In 1978, by Benny under the title "Bin wieder frei".
- In 1979, by Telex on the album Looking for Saint Tropez.
- In 1984, by Hermann Gunnarsson under the title "Einn dans við mig" on the album Frískur og Fjörugur.
- In 1988, by Rumble on the Beach on the album Rumble
- In 1992, by Sonic Youth for a compilation album.
- In 1997, by Thee Headcoatees on the album Punk Girls.
- In 1998, by the Presidents of the United States of America on their compilation album Rarities.
- In 2000, by Kim Kay as the third single from her compilation album Hits!.
- In 2006, by Richard Thompson on the album RT- The Life and Music of Richard Thompson.
- In 2006, by Pigloo under the title "Ça plane pour moi (le twist)", as the third single from the album La Banquise. It reached number 18 on the French SNEP Singles Chart and remained in the top 100 for 24 weeks.
- In 2009, by Nouvelle Vague on the album 3.
- In 2019, by Metallica at a concert in King Baudouin Stadium, Brussels.

== See also ==
- List of number-one singles of 1978 (France)
- List of number-one singles from 1968 to 1979 (Switzerland)
