= Rob'n'Raz featuring Leila K =

1990 studio album by Rob'n'Raz featuring Leila K

Studio album by Rob'n'Raz featuring Leila K
- Released: 1990
- Studio: Kroon Recorder, Mistlur Studios
- Label: Arista
- Producer: Rob'n'Raz

Rob'n'Raz featuring Leila K chronology
Rob'n'Raz featuring Leila K (1990)	Clubhopping The Album (1992)

Professional ratings
Review scores
Source	Rating
Select	2/5

Rob'n'Raz featuring Leila K is the 1990 debut studio album by Swedish dance music duo Rob'n'Raz, featuring Swedish singer and rapper Leila K on vocals. It includes the single "Got to Get", which reached the top 10 of most European charts and number 49 on the US Billboard Hot 100, and "Rok the Nation", which was a modest hit in Europe.

== Track listing ==
All tracks written by Rob'n'Raz, except where noted.

No.	Title	Writer(s)	Length
1.	"Acozawea"		2:36
2.	"Got to Get"	Rob'n'Raz; Leila K; MC II Fresh	3:21
3.	"On Tour"		3:43
4.	"Just Tell Me"	Rob'n'Raz; Leila K	3:52
5.	"Human Drummer"		0:54
6.	"It Feels So Right"	Rob'n'Raz; Leila K	4:02
7.	"From Scratch"		0:59
8.	"Rok the Nation"	Rob'n'Raz; Leila K; MC II Fresh	5:00
9.	"Do Something Nice"		3:42
10.	"Love 4 Love"	Rob'n'Raz; David Seisay	3:54
11.	"Fonky Beats for Your Mind"		0:38
12.	"Dance the Fonk"		4:16
13.	"Mind Expander"		3:17

CD bonus tracks

No.	Title	Writer(s)	Length
14.	"Rok the Nation" (Funk-E Drummer Mix)	Rob'n'Raz; Leila K; MC II Fresh	6:19
15.	"Got to Get" (Stones Nordik Swing Theory)	Rob'n'Raz; Leila K; MC II Fresh	4:41

== Personnel ==
Adapted from the album's liner notes.

- Rob'n'Raz – all music, production, arrangements
- Leila K – vocals
- Zemya Hamilton – backing vocals (tracks 8, 14)
- Kent Kroon – additional guitars
- Jan "DJ Lounge" Lindberg – engineer
- Eddie Monsoon – black and white photography
- Re-Flex! – packaging
- Jon Rekdal – additional brass
- Ewa-Marie Rundquist – colour photography
- Johnny Warta – additional brass
- Lizzie Zachrisson – backing vocals (tracks 3, 4, 6, 10)

== Charts ==
Chart (1990)	Peak position
Sweden (Sverigetopplistan)	14
