= In My Mind (Antiloop song) =

Single by Antiloop

from the album LP
- Released: March 1997
- Recorded: 1996–1997
- Length: 3:28 (Radio Edit); 6:42 (Extended Version)
- Label: Stockholm Records; Fluid Records; Polydor Records
- Songwriters: David Westerlund; Robin Söderman; New Deep Societys; The O.T. Quartet
- Producer: Antiloop

Antiloop singles chronology
"Purpose In Life" (1996)	"In My Mind" (1997)	"I Love You (Beauty and the Beast)" (1997)

"In My Mind" is a song by the Swedish electronic dance music duo Antiloop. It was released on 31 March 1997 by Stockholm Records and Fluid Records in Sweden, and Polydor Records in Europe, as the lead single from their debut studio album, LP (1997). It is the duo's most successful single, reaching number four in Norway and selling over 200 000 copies in France.

It won a Swedish Dance Music Awards for "Best Dance Single" in February 1998.

== Composition ==
The ambient intro in the beginning is taken from "Hold That Sucker Down (Builds Like a Skyscraper)" (1994) by The O.T. Quartet, real name Rollo Armstrong, famous for one of the founding member of the electronic music group Faithless.

The lyric "In My Mind", which is also the only lyric in the song, is taken from "Warehouse (Days of Glory)" (1989) by New Deep Societys.

== Music video ==
The video is black and white, except for the parts that are blue. A girl is walking on the streets in Stockholm wearing sunglasses and headphones. The duo Antiloop themselves make a cameo through her sunglasses with one on each of the lens.

== Appearances in other media ==
- The Swedish film Sherdil (1999) by Gita Mallik.
- The video game FIFA Football 2003 (2002).

== Track listing ==
=== 12-inch single ===
All tracks are written by David Westerlund and Robin Söderman.

Side one
No.	Title	Length
1.	"In My Mind"	6:36
2.	"In My Mind (Chamber Of Sound Dub)"	7:30

Side two
No.	Title	Length
3.	"In My Mind (Poor Mind Alteration Mix)" (Remix by Poor Impulse Control)	6:51
4.	"In My Mind (Mind Your Own Business Mix)" (Remix by Redtop)	7:16

=== CD single ===
No.	Title	Length
1.	"In My Mind (Radio Edit)"	3:28
2.	"In My Mind (Extended Version)"	6:42
3.	"In My Mind (Mind Your Own Business Mix)"	7:17
4.	"In My Mind (Chamber Of Sound Dub)"	7:25

== Charts ==
=== Weekly charts ===
Chart (1997–98)	Peak position
Belgium (Ultratop 50 Flanders)	34
Denmark (IFPI)	15
Europe (Eurochart Hot 100)	51
Finland (Suomen virallinen lista)	9
France (SNEP)	13
Netherlands (Dutch Top 40)	14
Netherlands (Single Top 100)	23
Norway (VG-lista)	4
Sweden (Sverigetopplistan)	6
UK Singles (OCC)	87

=== Year-end charts ===
Chart (1997)	Position
Sweden (Sverigetopplistan)	72

== Certifications and sales ==
Region	Certification	Certified units/sales
France	—	200,000
Sweden (GLF)	Gold	15,000^{^}
Norway (IFPI Norway)	Gold	
^{^} Shipments figures based on certification alone.
