= Slow Motion (Leila K song) =

Single by Leila K

from the album Carousel
- B-side: "Check the Dan"
- Released: 1993
- Genre: Euro reggae
- Length: 4:00
- Label: Mega
- Songwriters: Denniz PoP; Douglas Carr; Deep Fried; Al Agami
- Producers: Denniz PoP; Douglas Carr

Leila K singles chronology
"Ça Plane Pour Moi" (1993)	"Slow Motion" (1993)	"Electric" (1995)

Music video
- "Slow Motion" on YouTube

"Slow Motion" is a song by Swedish Eurodance singer and former rapper Leila K. It was released in 1993 by Mega Records as the third single from her debut solo-album, Carousel (1993). The song is co-written and produced by Denniz PoP and Douglas Carr. It peaked at number 27 on the Swedish single chart, number 20 in Finland and number 26 in Austria.

== Music video ==
The music video for "Slow Motion" is animated in stop-motion in a desert setting and mixing elements from Middle-Eastern, African, Asian and Jamaican cultures. A flying Leila K and posse on a flying carpet arrive in a desert village and a blue genie appears from a lamp.

== Critical reception ==
AllMusic editor Dean Carlson wrote that "Slow Motion" "spins out from under its foundational flavor of European techno-reggae and ends up sounding like a cross between M/A/R/R/S, Madonna, Mis-Teeq, and Big Audio Dynamite. Absurd and unquestionably wonderful."

== Track listing ==
- Maxi Single (Scandinavia)
1. "Slow Motion" (Short Version) - 4:00
2. "Slow Motion" (Long Version) - 6:25
3. "Check The Dan" (Duet Version) - 6:38

== Charts ==
Chart (1993)	Peak position
Austria (Ö3 Austria Top 40)	26
Finland (Suomen virallinen lista)	20
Germany (GfK)	37
Sweden (Sverigetopplistan)	27
