= Cool James and Black Teacher =

Swedish Eurodance band

- Origin: Solna, Sweden
- Genres: Eurodance
- Years active: 1992–1998
- Labels: Stockholm Records
- Past members: Cool James; Black Teacher

Cool James and Black Teacher (sometimes Cool James and the Black Teacher) were a Swedish Eurodance group consisting of Cool James and Black Teacher. The band was formed in Solna, Sweden, and was signed to Stockholm Records.

Their first singles never became big hits, it was not until they released their album Zooming You with the single "Dr. Feelgood" in 1994 that they broke through. It ended as number 21 on the most sold singles list that year and has retained popularity ever since.

James Dandu (Cool James), died in a car crash in his native country of Tanzania on August 27, 2002.

== Discography ==
=== Singles ===
Year	Single	Peak chart positions	
Year	Single	SWE	FIN
1994	"Dr. Feelgood"	2	16
1994	"Godfather"	5	20
1994	"The Rhythm of the Tribe"	7	—
1995	"Comala Wessa"	34	—
"—" denotes releases that did not chart
