= Rob'n'Raz =

Swedish musical duo

Rob'n'Raz were a Swedish music duo of Robert Wåtz and Rasmus Lindwall.

After some years of DJing in the late 1980s, they decided to start performing and composing together. They worked on production, remixing and scratching. For a time, Lindwall was the first choice when a Swedish recording demanded a scratch.

Leila K and Papa Dee were among the vocalists and rappers during the first years when the records were released by Swemix. They had two chart appearances in the UK Singles Chart with "Got to Get" (1989, #8) and "Rok the Nation" (1990, #41). In 1990, they released the album Rob'n'Raz featuring Leila K, which included those two songs.

Remixes were produced with Just D and Christer Sandelin. They produced a large number of unofficial remixes released by Remixed Records, such as ABBA's "Dancing Queen" among others. They also composed the music for the video game Safecracker (1997).

During 1993, on ZTV, they presented the dance/hip hop section Clubhopping. Later the same year, they released an album with the same name under the name Rob'n'Raz DLC with rapper David "D-Flex" Seisay and vocalist Lutricia McNeal. 'DLC' was short for 'David and Lutricia Combination'.

In the early 2000s, they appeared as judges on the TV4 musical show Småstjärnorna.

== Singles ==
List of singles, with selected chart positions
Year	Single	Peak positions										Album
Year	Single	SWE	AUS	NLD	BEL (FL)	GER	AUT	SWI	IRE	UK	US	Album
1988	"Competition Is None" (featuring Papa Dee)	—	—	—	—	—	—	—	—	—	—	singles only
1989	"Microphone Poet" (featuring Papa Dee)	—	—	—	—	—	—	—	—	—	—	singles only
1989	"Got to Get" (featuring Leila K)	10	57	2	5	3	3	3	14	8	48	Rob'n'Raz featuring Leila K (as Rob'n'Raz featuring Leila K)
1990	"Rok the Nation" (featuring Leila K)	3	79	23	31	21	—	13	21	41	—	Rob'n'Raz featuring Leila K (as Rob'n'Raz featuring Leila K)
1990	"Just Tell Me" (featuring Leila K)	—	—	—	—	—	—	—	—	—	—	Rob'n'Raz featuring Leila K (as Rob'n'Raz featuring Leila K)
1991	"Bite the Beat / 6 Minutes"	14	—	—	—	—	—	—	—	—	—	Clubhopping (as Rob'n'Raz DLC)
1992	"Clubhopping"	13	—	11	—	—	—	—	—	—	—	Clubhopping (as Rob'n'Raz DLC)
1992	"Love You Like I Do"	—	—	—	—	—	—	—	—	—	—	Clubhopping (as Rob'n'Raz DLC)
1992	"Dancing Queen" (as Rob'n'Raz DLC)	31	—	—	—	—	—	—	—	—	—	Various – ABBA-The Tribute
1993	"In Command"	1	—	—	—	—	—	—	—	87	—	Spectrum (as Rob'n'Raz starring D-Flex, Lutricia McNeal Combination)
1993	"Big City Life" (Sökarna soundtrack)	—	—	—	—	—	—	—	—	—	—	Spectrum (as Rob'n'Raz starring D-Flex, Lutricia McNeal Combination)
1994	"Power House"	12	—	—	—	—	—	—	—	—	—	Spectrum (as Rob'n'Raz starring D-Flex, Lutricia McNeal Combination)
1995	"Mona Lisa"	—	—	—	—	—	—	—	—	—	—	Circus (as Rob'n'Raz with D-Flex)
1996	"Whose Dog Is Dead (Someone's Sleeping in My Bed)"	16	—	—	—	—	—	—	—	—	—	Circus (as Rob'n'Raz with D-Flex)
1996	"Take a Ride"	8	—	—	—	—	—	—	—	—	—	Circus (as Rob'n'Raz with D-Flex)
1996	"Throw Your Hands in the Air"	31	—	—	—	—	—	—	—	—	—	Circus (as Rob'n'Raz with D-Flex)
2005	"Snake" (featuring Lorén)	—	—	—	—	—	—	—	—	—	—	singles only
2007	"My Girl" (featuring Rigo)	22	—	—	—	—	—	—	—	—	—	singles only
"—" denotes releases that did not chart or were not released.
