= George C. Nichopoulos =

American physician

- Born: George Constantine Nichopoulos; October 29, 1927; Ridgway, Pennsylvania
- Died: February 24, 2016 (aged 88); Memphis, Tennessee
- Education: Vanderbilt University School of Medicine
- Known for: Elvis Presley's personal physician
- Scientific career
- Fields: medical

George Constantine Nichopoulos (October 29, 1927 – February 24, 2016), also known as Dr. Nick, was an American physician of Greek descent.

Dr. Nick was Elvis Presley's personal physician and was controversial due to the singer's abuse of prescription drugs. The Tennessee Medical Board permanently revoked Nichopoulos's license for years of overprescribing medications.

== Early life and education ==
Born in Ridgway, Pennsylvania, Nichopoulos moved to Anniston, Alabama, during his infancy where his father, a Greek immigrant, opened a restaurant called Gus' Sanitary Cafe.

From 1946 until 1948, he served in the Army Medical Corps in Germany before studying at the University of the South, where he received his B.S. in 1951. Nichopoulos subsequently earned his M.D. at the Vanderbilt University School of Medicine in 1959. His specialty was internal medicine.

== Career ==
Nichopoulos began treating Presley in 1967 for saddle sores, and took it on as a full-time job in 1970 until Presley's death in 1977. His son Dean Nichopoulos sometimes served as an assistant for Presley, taking care of his wardrobe. George Nichopoulos was not present at Graceland the day Presley died. In fact, he was so hard to contact that he only had the time to jump into the departing ambulance, which had not been called immediately after finding Presley's lifeless body. Saying that he "attempted to save his life" might be exaggerated, as it was obvious to even non-medical staff that Presley had been dead for several hours when his entourage found him in his bathroom. His face was rigid to the point that mouth-to-mouth resuscitation was impossible, according to Joe Esposito, and had already turned blue. Cook Nancy Rooks' testimony is that she heard a "loud noise upstairs" around 9:30 - 10:00 a.m., about four hours before Presley's body was finally discovered. Nurse Marion Cocke stated: "It was so evident he had been gone a long time". There were some revival attempts at the hospital, just in case, during which Nichopoulos was present, but it was clear after 15–20 minutes that it did not make any sense. Nichopoulos was also present at the autopsy, but the contents of Presley's stomach had been pumped out and thrown away shortly after his arrival at the hospital. Nichopoulos served as a pallbearer at the funeral.

In 1979, Nichopoulos was shot in the chest while watching a football game; he was not seriously injured. No suspect was ever arrested. In a 1993 interview with Dutch radio host Jorrit van der Kooi, Nichopoulos claimed it must have been an angry Presley fan.

In 1985, he started a solo practice called We Care, Inc.

After he was stripped of his credentials in 1995, Nichopoulos worked for a short time as Jerry Lee Lewis's road manager. He later took a job evaluating medical insurance claims by FedEx employees. No longer a doctor and in need of money, Nichopoulos sold many of the items he received from Presley at auctions, and at one point had a travelling exhibit, showing off his doctor's bag with some of the medications he prescribed for Presley.

== Legal battles ==
In 1980, Nichopoulos was indicted on 14 counts of overprescribing drugs to Elvis Presley, Jerry Lee Lewis and twelve other patients. The district attorney ruled out murder charges because of the conflicting medical opinions about the cause of Presley's death. In the first eight months of 1977 alone, Nichopoulos had prescribed over 10,000 doses of amphetamines, barbiturates, narcotics, tranquilizers, sleeping pills, laxatives, and hormones for Presley. Nichopoulos claimed he had tried in vain to reduce Presley's dependency, even going so far as to manufacture one thousand placebos for Presley, but to no avail. The jury concluded that he had tried to act in the best interests of his patients. He was acquitted on all counts.

Also in 1980, the Tennessee Board of Medical Examiners found him guilty of overprescription, but decided that he was not unethical. They imposed three months' suspension of his licence and three years' probation.

In 1993, Nichopoulos had his license permanently revoked by the Tennessee Board of Medical Examiners, and was branded a Doctor Feelgood in the press, after it was revealed that he had been overprescribing to numerous patients for years. Nichopoulos claimed it was for patients that suffered from inoperable chronic pain, but he was unsuccessful in his defense. During his many appeals, Nichopoulos admitted to the board that he had overprescribed. "I cared too much", he told them. During his court cases many friends supported him, raising money and holding benefits to pay for court costs.

== Death ==
George Nichopoulos died in Memphis, Tennessee, on February 24, 2016, after an extended illness, aged 88. He is buried at Memorial Park Cemetery in Memphis, Tennessee.

== See also ==
- Combined drug intoxication
- Dr. Feelgood (disambiguation)
- Prescription drug
- Theodor Morell
- Conrad Murray
