= Rok the Nation =

Single by Rob'n'Raz feat. Leila K

from the album Rob'n'Raz feat. Leila K
- Released: March 1990
- Genre: Hip hop
- Label: BMG
- Songwriters: Rob'n'Raz, Leila K, MC II Fresh

Rob'n'Raz feat. Leila K singles chronology
| "Got to Get" (1989) | "Rok the Nation" (1990) | "Open Sesame" (1992) |

Music video
- "Rok the Nation" on YouTube

"Rok the Nation" is a song by Swedish electronic music duo Rob'n'Raz featuring rapper Leila K, released in March 1990 by BMG as the second single from their debut album, Rob'n'Raz feat. Leila K (1990). It peaked at number three in both Sweden and Finland. Additionally, the song was a top-20 hit in the Netherlands and Switzerland, and a top-30 hit in Ireland and West Germany. In the UK, "Rok the Nation" reached number 41 on the UK Singles Chart.

== Critical reception ==
Mick Mercer from Melody Maker commented, "Ah, now here's something interesting. Leila K [...] has a nice voice that made "Got to Get" the little fun bundle that it was. This is more interesting, with some studiously sharp vocals and a chintzy keyboard carpet pattern for her to rub the dirt into. It's tougher than you'd expect with lovely trumpet touches and a successful plunge down to the rhythm near the end followed by some fast, oddly stippled vocal delivery."

David Giles from Music Week wrote, "The team that sneaked a surprise hit with the recent "Got to Get" follow up with a track that is heavy enough to please clubbers but with enough hooks to succeed chartwise again. The drum machine break sounds suspiciously similar in Japan's "Vision Of China" though..." Siân Pattenden from Smash Hits felt that "this is harder, dare I say funkier than 'Got to Get'".

== Versions ==
- Rok The Dancefloor 6:52
- Radio Edit 3:43
- SweMix Club Version 5:20
- Panik Mix 6:08
- Funk-E-Drummer Mix 6:11
- Like A Drum Mix 3:42

== Charts ==
=== Weekly charts ===
| Chart (1990) | Peak position |
|---|---|
| Australia (ARIA) | 79 |
| Europe (Eurochart Hot 100) | 41 |
| Finland (Suomen virallinen lista) | 3 |
| Ireland (IRMA) | 21 |
| Italy Airplay (Music & Media) | 8 |
| Netherlands (Dutch Top 40) | 16 |
| Netherlands (Single Top 100) | 23 |
| Sweden (Sverigetopplistan) | 3 |
| Switzerland (Schweizer Hitparade) | 13 |
| UK Singles (OCC) | 41 |
| West Germany (GfK) | 21 |
