= Hubble Bubble =

Belgian punk band

Hubble Bubble was a Belgian English-language punk band in which Plastic Bertrand started his career.

Formed in 1973 by Alain Bureau and managed by Bernard Schol, the band released an eponymous album in 1977 on Barclay Records. Plastic Bertrand is listed as a songwriter, singer and drummer under the name of Roger Junior.

The group experienced difficulties following the death of bassist Daniel Massart, as result of an accident while returning from a rehearsal, and the departure of Plastic Bertrand. The success of the latter overshadowed the group's own success.

The group released two albums: Hubble Bubble (1977) and Faking (1979). Daggerman Records has reissued both albums.
