= Cool James =

Tanzanian-Swedish musician

- Also known as: Mtoto wa Dandu, CJ Massive
- Born: James Dandu; 5 July 1970; Kwimba,Mwanza, Tanzania
- Origin: Stockholm, Sweden
- Died: 26 August 2002 (aged 32) Dar es Salaam, Tanzania
- Genre: Hip hop
- Occupations: Rapper, singer, songwriter, record producer
- Years active: 1988–2002
- Formerly of: Swahili Nation, Cool James & Black Teacher

James Dandu (5 July 1970 – 26 August 2002), also known by his stage name Cool James, was a Tanzanian–Swedish rapper and record producer.

== Life and Career ==
Born in Mwanza, Tanzania and having finished his primary studies at Kurasini Primary School in Tanzania, he moved with his mother and siblings to Stockholm, Sweden.

His professional musical career started in 1988, he released his first musical album in 1992, already a dance-oriented production. In 1993 he got together with another East African named Andrew Muturi to form the group "Swahili Nation". After a while they let a brother of Andrew join the group, and after that yet another brother. James left and joined with a Congolese, Jose Masena and formed the band Cool James & Black Teacher. They released only two albums, the 1992 record Undercover Lover and the 1994 record Zooming You, which included the hit song "Dr. Feelgood".

A while after the Cool James and Black Teacher band, James moved back to Tanzania and started producing for East African artists as well as working on his own projects. He started the Tanzanian Music Awards in 1999.

== Personal life ==
James had two kids, Caroline-Jamie, who he referred to as Malaika, born 1994, and Michael James Junior, born 1997. He mentioned his kids in nearly all his songs, as well as his fiancee, Devota.

== Death ==
On 26 August 2002 James Dandu died in a car accident in Dar es Salaam, Tanzania.
