= Fatima Rainey =

Swedish pop singer (born 1967)

- Born: 24 July 1967 (age 59); Gothenburg, Sweden
- Origin: Sweden
- Genres: Pop, soul
- Occupations: Singer, musician
- Instrument: Vocals
- Years active: 1997–present
- Labels: EastWest Japan, Warner Music

Fatima Rainey (born 24 July 1967) is a Swedish pop singer.

Rainey has released two studio albums through Warner Music Group of Japan. She was married to actor and stand-up comedian Claes Malmberg. She also has a daughter by the name Perla Malmberg with Claes. Perla has expanded her social media over the last year and has been gaining a lot of followers on platforms like Tiktok. They also have a son together whose name is Nelson.

Her 1998 song "Hey" was a huge hit in South Africa and remains popular today. The song also became a dance hit in the Philippines.

== Discography ==
=== Albums ===
- 1997: Love Is a Wonderful Thing
- 2001: Celebration

Compilations

- 1990: Solid Productions Taking Over
- 1997: The Remix Collection

=== Singles ===
- 1990: "You Broke My Heart (ft. MC Mack)"
- 1994: "Love Is a Wonderful Thing"
- 1997: "I Gave You the Best" (Remix)
- 1997: "Find Our Way Back"
- 1998: "Hey"
