= Papa Dee =

Swedish rapper (born 1966)

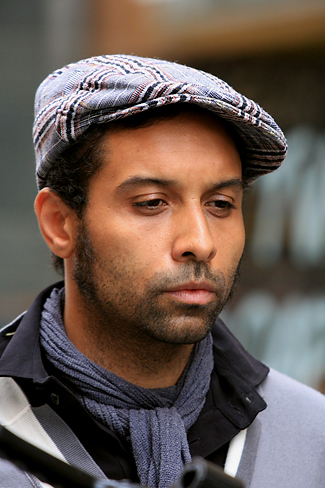
- Papa Dee in 2008

Background information
- Also known as: Papa Dee
- Born: David Christopher Daniel Wahlgren; 13 July 1966 (age 60)
- Origin: Gothenburg, Sweden
- Genres: Hip hop, ragga, dancehall, trip hop
- Occupations: Musician, songwriter, voice actor
- Instrument: Vocals
- Years active: 1988–present
- Website: papadee.se

David Christopher Daniel Wahlgren (born 13 July 1966), better known by the stage name Papa Dee, is a Swedish rapper. His most commercially successful track is his version of the Cat Stevens song "The First Cut Is the Deepest".

== Music career ==
Wahlgren debuted in 1988 with the single "Funky Raggamuffin/Let the Music Play", a mixture of dancehall and hip hop. He then joined the Stonefunkers and became the group's rapper. This was followed by a few years of cooperation with Rob'n'Raz. Wahlgren then went solo, and had his breakthrough in 1990 with the album Lettin' Off Steam, which was predominantly hip hop and dancehall. His next album, One Step Ahead, had elements of soul and reggae, mixing song and rap. His 1994 release, Original Master, produced by Denniz Pop at Cheiron Studio, incorporated Euro disco into his music.

During the 1990s and 2000s, he released several albums, often in cooperation with Desmond Foster and a couple with Soundism. 2001, Soundism also produced the Papa Dee song "Hottie Hottie Girls" featuring Lady Saw, Jamaica's prime female dancehall star. Kent (Gillström) Isaacs also produced a couple of Papa Dee's more daring and innovative albums. One of the albums they did together was the cover album, recorded in Jamaica, with reggae musicians including Horse-Mouth, Flabba Holt and Chinna Smith. He is also a member of The Brooklyn Funk Essentials and of Dubchek with David Barratt.

His songs have been featured in several feature films including Predator 2, starring Danny Glover. In 1997 Dubchek made music for the critically acclaimed Two Girls and a Guy featuring Robert Downey, Jr. and Heather Graham. In the Swedish feature film/comedy Smala Sussie Papa Dee was credited both featuring as himself onscreen and as songwriter.

PD composed music for the stage (Top Dog/ Underdog at Stockholms Stadsteater)

Papa Dee has also had a career as a voice artist.

=== Partial voice work ===
- In the 1990s, Wahlgren dubbed Buster Bunny in Tiny Toon Adventures, rendering that of the character's original voice actor, Charlie Adler
- He took on Eddie Murphy's character in "Mulan" (1998) and "Mulan 2" (2005) as Mushu
- In Snow Dogs (2002) he rendered Cuba Gooding Jr's character .
- He also dubbed Will Smith in the Swedish release of "Shark Tale/Hajar som Hajar" (2004) - he featured as Oscar.
- In Space Chimps (2008) he voiced Andy Samberg's character Ham 3.

As founding member of the NYC groove collective Brooklyn Funk Essentials he has recorded 4 full-length albums:

- Cool and Steady and Easy (1994)
- In the Buzz Bag (1998)
- Make Them Like It (2000)
- Watcha Playin’ (2009)

As Dubchek with David Barrat, Papa Dee recorded full-length albums

- Down Memory Gap Lane (1998)
- The Far East End (2010)

Highlights as featuring guest artist include:

- Leftfield's Leftism on the track Release the Pressure - additional vocals (1995)
- Titiyo My Body says Yes (1990)
- Mad Professor compilation DJ’ s Choice Tribute to MLK (1990)
- Diana King's album Respect (2002) in the duet Keep It On The Downlow

In 2001 Chrysler used his track ”Ispy” for its worldwide commercial.

Between 2000-2008 Papa Dee hosted his own radio show, P3 Rytm for SR, the Swedish National Radio Network

2012: Back on the move Papa Dee's currently working on his book Was Jean Baptiste Bernadotte a blackman? and his upcoming album Fall From Grace is in the final stages.

== Personal life ==
Wahlgren was born in Gothenburg, Sweden, to a Swedish mother and a Ghanaian father. His father left the family when he was a small child.

On 14 September 2008, Wahlgren was arrested and charged with grave assault (Swedish: grov misshandel) with bodily harm to his wife Andrea on a street and in their apartment. His wife categorically denied that maltreatment had taken place and later wrote a book, En Fjärils Kamp (A Butterfly's Struggle), about how she was not heard in the trial. Despite this, a Swedish lower court found him guilty of a lesser charge of assault (Swedish: misshandel) on 20 October 2008 based on testimony from multiple witnesses and he was fined SEK 8,700. In 2010, the Swedish High Court acquitted him of the other charges of assaulting his wife in their apartment after she denied the assault. Papa Dee was awarded SEK 25,000 for the suffering as a result of the prosecution and SEK 18,045 for lost income and costs. Papa Dee and Andrea Wahlgren divorced in 2012.

== Discography ==
=== Albums ===
- Lettin' Off Steam (1990)
- One Step Ahead (1993)
- Original Master (1994)
- The Journey (1996)
- Island Rock (1998)
- The Man Who Couldn't Say No (2001)
- Live It Up! (2004)
- A Little Way Different (2008)
- Fall From Grace (2012)

=== Singles ===
Year	Title	Peak chart positions				Album
Year	Title	SWE	AUT	FIN	NOR	Album
1988	"Let the Music Play / Funky Raggamuffin"	—	—	—	—	single only
1989	"Microphone Poet" (with Rob'n'Raz)	—	—	—	—	Lettin' Off Steam
1990	"Ain't No Stoppin' Us Now"	16	—	—	—	Lettin' Off Steam
1990	"Lettin' Off Steam"	—	—	—	—	Lettin' Off Steam
1990	"Beautiful Woman (Love Supreme)"	—	—	—	—	Lettin' Off Steam
1991	"Take It Easy"	—	—	—	—	One Step Ahead
1992	"Ain't No Substitute"	6	—	—	—	One Step Ahead
1993	"Runaround Girl"	19	—	—	—	One Step Ahead
1993	"Mr. Taxidriver"	—	—	—	—	One Step Ahead
1994	"I'd Rather Be with You"	—	—	—	—	Original Master
1994	"Jungle Sound Clash"	—	—	—	—	Original Master
1995	"The First Cut Is the Deepest"	5	20	—	9	The Journey
1996	"The Journey"	9	—	20	—	The Journey
1996	"The Tide Is High"	44	—	20	—	The Journey
1996	"Feeding You Lies"	—	—	—	—	The Journey
1998	"Island Rock"	23	—	—	—	Island Rock
1998	"Endless Road"	—	—	—	—	Island Rock
1999	"The Big Showdown"	—	—	—	—	The Man Who Couldn't Say No
2001	"I Spy"	40	—	—	—	The Man Who Couldn't Say No
2001	"Hottie Hottie Girls"	—	—	—	—	The Man Who Couldn't Say No
2005	"My No 1" (from Melodifestivalen)	51	—	—	—	single only
2005	"Murder in the Dancehall"	—	—	—	—	Live It Up!
2008	"Suzy Wong"	—	—	—	—	Papa Dee Meets the Jamaican Giants
"—" denotes releases that did not chart or were not released.

=== Singles as featured artist ===
Year	Single	Peak chart positions				Album
Year	Single	SWE	FIN	UK	US	Album
1988	"Summertime Is Partytime / Summertime" (by Jon Rekdal)	—	—	—	—	singles only
1988	"Competition Is None" (by Rob'n'Raz)	—	—	—	—	singles only
1989	"After The Rain (Ragamuffin Style)" (by Titiyo)	13	—	60	—	singles only
1990	"Big Bad World" (by Dayeene)	—	—	—	—	United Soul Power
1991	"My Body Says Yes" (by Titiyo)	—	—	—	42	Titiyo
1991	"Come Back (For Real Love) (The Remix)" (by Alison Limerick)	—	—	53	—	singles only
1992	"Girls" (by Timebomb)	—	—	—	—	singles only
1993	"Dangerous" (by Swing-A-Ling Sound System)	—	—	—	—	Swing-A-Ling Sound System Volume One
1996	"Release The Pressure" (by Leftfield)	—	—	13	—	Leftism
1996	"Rude Boy" (by Leila K)	29	8	—	—	Manic Panic
2000	"Petite Très Chic" (by Elephant)	—	—	—	—	Selected Random
2003	"Girls' Anthem (The Girlie Tune)" (by Beats and Styles)	—	14	—	—	This Is... Beats And Styles
2004	"Allstars" (by Beats and Styles)	—	2	—	—	single only
2006	"Fira Med Oss" (by Emrik Larsson)	—	—	—	—	Kontrollen
2007	"Take It Back" (by Beats And Styles)	—	—	—	—	Walk, Don't Talk
2007	"Automatic (Morgan Page vs. Peace Bisquit Radio Mix)" (by Ultra Naté)	—	—	—	—	single only
"—" denotes releases that did not chart or were not released.

=== Other appearances ===
- Debut studio album - The Bitter Twins (TBA)

== See also ==
- Swedish hip hop
