= Leila K =

Swedish singer (born 1971)

- Born: Laila El Khalifi; 6 September 1971 (age 55)
- Origin: Bergsjön, Gothenburg, Sweden
- Genres: Pop; Eurodance
- Occupation: Singer
- Years active: 1989–1999; 2011–present

Laila El Khalifi (Arabic: ليلى الخليفي; born 6 September 1971) better known by her stage name Leila K, is a Swedish Eurodance singer of Moroccan descent.

== Early life ==
El Khalifi's parents decided to send her to a school in Morocco, but she did not fit into the system so after one year she returned to Sweden.

== Career ==
Leila was discovered by the musical duo Rob'n'Raz when singing in a music contest. They liked her music and offered her a recording contract in 1988. Together with Rob'n'Raz she had her first hit in 1989 with the song "Got to Get" (first recorded within the UK as a pre-production demo by Pete Towns of P&P Productions) and released an album in 1990, Rob'n'Raz featuring Leila K.

During the first years of her career she had many chart-topping hits and her music was played all over Europe. She broke up with Rob'n'Raz and went on her own to Ibiza, where she set up concerts on her own. In 1990 she collaborated with Dr. Alban on his single "Hello Afrika". Her solo career started in 1991 with the single "Time" which she followed up with other singles, such as "Open Sesame" and a cover version of Plastic Bertrand's "Ça Plane Pour Moi".

In 1995 Leila K was back on the music scene with the single "Electric". She kept releasing new music until 1997, but since then she has not released anything new.

In 1998, SVT made a documentary about Leila K's claim to stardom called Fuck You, Fuck You Very Much. The event focuses on an incident that happened during the 1996 Swedish Grammis awards. In 2000, she appeared on Daisy Dee's "Open Sesame" video, a cover of her own 1992 hit. This mentioned song is sampled on U96's single "Love Religion". Daisy Dee was the presenter of the show Viva Club Rotation at the time. In 2003, Swedish media reported that Leila K was living on the streets, stealing food to survive. The record company decided to help her financially by releasing a compilation album titled Leila K's Greatest Tracks.

In 2005, the Swedish cartoonist Martin Kellerman conducted an interview with Leila K for his own comic book magazine, Rocky. In June 2007, Swedish media reported that she turned up as a surprise guest at a release party for the book Bögjävlar, performing the songs "Ça Plane Pour Moi" and "Electric".

In May 2011, Leila K appeared for the first time in years as a featured guest on a new track called "Legendary", by artist Wallenberg.

== Discography ==
=== Studio albums ===
Title	Details	Peak chart positions					
Title	Details	SWE	AUT	FIN	GER	NL	SWI
Rob'n'Raz feat Leila K	Release date: May 1990; Label: Telegram Records Stockholm; Formats: CD	14	27	—	—	81	30
Carousel	Release date: September 1993; Label: Urban Records; Formats: CD	30	10	—	30	89	32
Manic Panic	Release date: June 1996; Label: Mega Records; Formats: CD	17	—	4	—	—	—
Leila K's Greatest Tracks	Release date: May 2003; Label: Bonnier Music Sweden; Formats: CD	40	—	—	—	—	—
"—" denotes releases that did not chart.

=== Singles ===
Year	Single	Peak chart positions									Certifications (sales thresholds)	Album
Year	Single	SWE	AUT	FIN	GER	IRE	NL	NOR	SWI	UK	Certifications (sales thresholds)	Album
1989	"Got to Get"	10	3	10	3	14	2	4	3	8	SWE: Gold	Rob'n'Raz feat Leila K
1990	"Rok the Nation"	3	—	3	21	21	16	—	13	41	SWE: Gold	Rob'n'Raz feat Leila K
1990	"Just Tell Me"	—	—	—	—	—	—	—	—	—		Rob'n'Raz feat Leila K
1990	"It Feels So Right"	—	—	—	—	—	—	—	—	—		Rob'n'Raz feat Leila K
1991	"Time"	—	—	—	—	—	—	—	—	—		Singles only
1991	"Magic Ball"	30	—	—	—	—	—	—	—	—		Singles only
1992	"Open Sesame"	21	5	9	5	13	2	—	4	23		Carousel
1993	"Ça Plane Pour Moi"	25	8	6	13	—	24	—	17	69		Carousel
1993	"Check the Dan"	—	—	—	—	—	—	—	—	—		Carousel
1993	"Slow Motion"	27	26	20	37	—	—	—	—	—		Carousel
1993	"Close Your Eyes"	—	—	—	—	—	—	—	—	—		Carousel
1995	"Electric"	8	—	2	61	—	—	—	—	—		Manic Panic
1996	"C'Mon Now"	21	—	3	—	—	—	—	—	—		Manic Panic
1996	"Rude Boy"	29	—	8	—	—	—	—	—	—		Manic Panic
1996	"Blacklisted"	—	—	—	—	—	—	—	—	—		Manic Panic
1997	"Party Police"	—	—	—	—	—	—	—	—	—		Single only
"—" denotes releases that did not chart.

== Trivia ==
- Leila K's track "Rude Boy" is the source of Darude's artist name.

== Featured on ==
- Dr. Alban feat. Leila K - Hello Afrika (1990)
- Elephant & Castle vs. Leila K – Burning Up (Madonna cover) (1999)
- House of Wallenberg feat. Leila K - Legendary (2011)
- Håkan Hellström feat. Leila K - Ska flyga nu (2020)

== See also ==
- Music of Sweden
