= David Seisay =

Swedish musician, songwriter, trainer

David Seisay (aka MC Stranger aka D-Flex) is a Swedish-American songwriter, musician and entrepreneur who became known as a rapper in Rob'n'Raz but is also known for his career as a personal trainer. He is the founder and CEO of D-Flex House of Fitness, a company that provides health and wellness services.

He co-wrote the song 'One Step Closer To You' for B-Boys International and performed with them at the Swedish national selection for the 2005 Eurovision Song Contest. In 2009 he scored an international hit with the song 'Touch You Right Now' which he co-wrote with Peter Thelenius.

== Music ==
A noted pioneer of Swedish hip hop music, he has enjoyed international chart success since the 1990s.

=== MC Stranger ===
He began his career as a rapper under the name MC Stranger. He formed a hip hop act called the Sure Shot Groove and released the EP Rhymes Are Flowing in 1989. The same year he began writing songs with Rob'n'Raz and featured on the duet Love 4 Love with Leila K. He appeared regularly as a DJ and performer on Rob'n'Raz's music variety show on ZTV. He also worked with the legendary Denniz Pop

=== D Flex ===
He changed his stage name to D-Flex. Together with Rob'n'Raz, he formed two chart topping bands: Rob'n'Raz DLC with Lutricia McNeal and Rob'n'Raz Circus. They released several records during the 1990s, collaborating with a number of other artists, including Dr Alban.

He co-wrote the song One Step Closer to You with Peter Thelenius which he performed with B-Boys International at Melodifestivalen 2005.

A collaboration with Norwegian production team Stargate led to success in the British charts in 2002 with the track Easier Said Than Done. He performed with Stargate at Wembley Stadium in 2002.

He co-wrote and featured on the 2008 hit Touch You Right Now with Basic Element.

== Fitness ==
He owns a fitness company and is often referred to in the media as Sweden's fitness guru. He was the exclusive fitness trainer for the Joakim Nätterqvist, Miss Sweden Beauty Pageant and he has advised Axwell, Max Martin, Mikael Persbrandt, Marie Serneholt, Elin Nordegren, Carolina Gynning, Papa Dee, Anna Book, Annika Duckmark, and Carola Häggkvist. He also penned a fitness advice column for Swedish ELLE Magazine. In 1998 he released a successful work out video.

In 1999, he praised Sweden's Crown Princess Victoria in the news media when she unveiled a new toned physique for embracing a healthy lifestyle, saying: "She is a fantastic woman. She's focused a lot on training."

In 2001 he featured in his own segment the TV4 fitness series Frivolt. In 2005 he appeared on an episode the Swedish reality series Bröllopsnoja, TV4's fitness program Forma kroppen and Kanal 5's Dolce Vita. In 2006 he was a guest trainer on TV3's Du är vad du äter.

== Personal life ==
Born in Helsingborg, Sweden and raised in Westchester County, he is the son of a West African diplomat and journalist. His mother is a member of the Swedish nobility and both of his parents are in the Social Register. As a child Seisay attended the United Nations International School in Manhattan. He was a model in New York before he moved to Sweden in the 1980s.
