= Melodie MC =

Swedish musician

Kent Lövgren, (born 1970) better known as Melodie MC, is a Swedish recording artist, performing as a rapper on Eurodance tracks, who was active in music between 1992 and 1998.

== Biography ==
He went to school with classmate Erik Svensson (Alias Stattik.) They both shared a passion for music and dance. Melodie MC learnt breakdancing whereas Alias Stattik was involved in computers and synthesizers. Starting with only two keyboards and a computer, they worked together to develop complex sounds and music. Melodie MC gradually moved into the role of vocal artistry for the group.

Melodie MC released his first single in 1992, entitled "Feel Your Body Moving", it was followed by many hits and three albums. "We're Down With The Dragons", a track released as a single from his first album, was a tribute to the Swedish basketball team Sundsvall Dragons. In this track, Melodie MC teamed up with fellow rapper Modest, also from Sundsvall. He would also be involved in Melodie MC's shows.

Like many other rappers' albums, many vocalists took part in his albums : as for the first album, the single version of "Dum Da Dum" (initially sung by Pia Sjöberg) was sung by Mayomi (who also released some solo singles, such as "What Ever I", a kind of hip hop-dance). This single was No. 21 in Israel. Pia Tjärnlund sung for "Free", "So Good" and "Come Together". Johanna Ljungberg's voice was featured on "Wondering", and Lotta Sundgren on "I Wanna Dance". When the single "Dum Da Dum" was released, it became popular in many countries. During this time Melodie MC was busy touring many countries outside Scandinavia and all over Europe.

As for the second album The Return, "Bomba Deng" was sung once again by Mayomi and "Safe Sex" by Charlie King. Roberto Romboni took part on "Give It Up! For the Melodie)" and "Anyone Out There". For "Livin in the Jungle" they used St James' voice (he had also released a midtempo dance track in 1995 entitled "I Would Die For You", and was a member of Sound Factory). "Climb Any Mountain" (co-written with Rohen Heath from Urban Cookie Collective) was sung by Yvonne Shelton and "Heaven" and "Mr Harmony" by Susanne Bertlin. This time Melodie MC embarked on a return tour.

In the third album, Jocelyn Brown took part on vocals for almost all the album's songs. Jenny Gustavsson sung the vocals of "The Ultimate Experience" which is an intro, Charlie King appears on "Fake", Obiaman and Susanne Bertlin were featured on "No !", M Dread took part to "Mush It Up", and Mattews Green (rapper on Pandora's Tell The World album) did the male vocals on "Phenomenia".

On stage Johanna Ljungberg did the vocals and Susanne Bertlin the background vocals. Statikk also appeared among the three keyboard players. Melodie MC did rap-parts for S-Connection, appeared on singer Jennifer Newberry's track "Jump To The Beat" as guest rapper in 1999, and briefly appeared on a track of the Daze album in 2000, before disappearing from the music scene altogether.

He is no longer a rapper in the music industry, although he briefly reunited with his band crew to perform his hit "Dum Da Dum" at the Sundsvall Music Awards. He has returned to using his real name and is now a businessman running a marketing business with two other business partners and teaches part-time at the local university.

== Discography ==
=== Albums ===
List of albums, with selected chart positions
| Title | Album details | Peak chart positions | | |
| Title | Album details | SWE | AUS | NED |
|---|---|---|---|---|
| Northland Wonderland | Released: 1993; Label: Sidelake, Virgin | 20 | 116 | 63 |
| The Return | Released: 1995; Label: Sidelake, Virgin | 28 | — | — |
| The Ultimate Experience (featuring Jocelyn Brown) | Released: 1997; Label: Virgin | — | — | — |

=== Singles ===
| Year | Single | Peak chart positions | | | | | Album | Certifications |
| Year | Single | SWE | AUS | BEL (FL) | EUR | NLD | Album | Certifications |
|---|---|---|---|---|---|---|---|---|
| 1992 | "Feel Your Body Movin'" | 23 | — | — | — | — | | Northland Wonderland |
| 1992 | "Take Me Away" | — | — | — | — | — | | Northland Wonderland |
| 1993 | "Dum Da Dum" | 7 | 5 | 18 | 13 | 4 | ARIA: Gold | Northland Wonderland |
| 1993 | "I Wanna Dance" | 6 | 21 | 27 | — | 10 | | Northland Wonderland |
| 1994 | "Free" | 33 | 103 | — | — | — | | Northland Wonderland |
| 1994 | "We're Down with the Dragons" | — | — | — | — | — | | Northland Wonderland |
| 1994 | "Give It Up! (For the Melodie)" | 6 | 98 | — | 84 | — | | The Return |
| 1995 | "Anyone Out There" | 5 | 114 | — | 54 | — | | The Return |
| 1995 | "Climb Any Mountain" | 23 | 137 | — | — | — | | The Return |
| 1995 | "Bomba Deng" | — | — | — | — | — | | The Return |
| 1995 | "Living in the Jungle / Vibe" | — | — | — | — | — | | The Return |
| 1997 | "Real Man" | 19 | — | — | — | — | | The Ultimate Experience (feat. Jocelyn Brown) |
| 1997 | "Embrace the Power" | 51 | — | — | — | — | | The Ultimate Experience (feat. Jocelyn Brown) |
| 1997 | "Fake / Give Me Back Your Love" | — | — | — | — | — | | The Ultimate Experience (feat. Jocelyn Brown) |
| 1998 | "Move On" | — | — | — | — | — | | The Ultimate Experience (feat. Jocelyn Brown) |
| 2009 | "Dum Da Dum '09" | — | — | — | — | — | | single only |
"—" denotes releases that did not chart or were not released.

=== Features ===
- "Jump To The Beat" - Jennifer Newberry feat Melodie Mc (1999)
- Redlight District - Daze album - "They Came To Rule" (2000)
