= Plastic Bertrand =

Belgian editor, musician, producer, songwriter

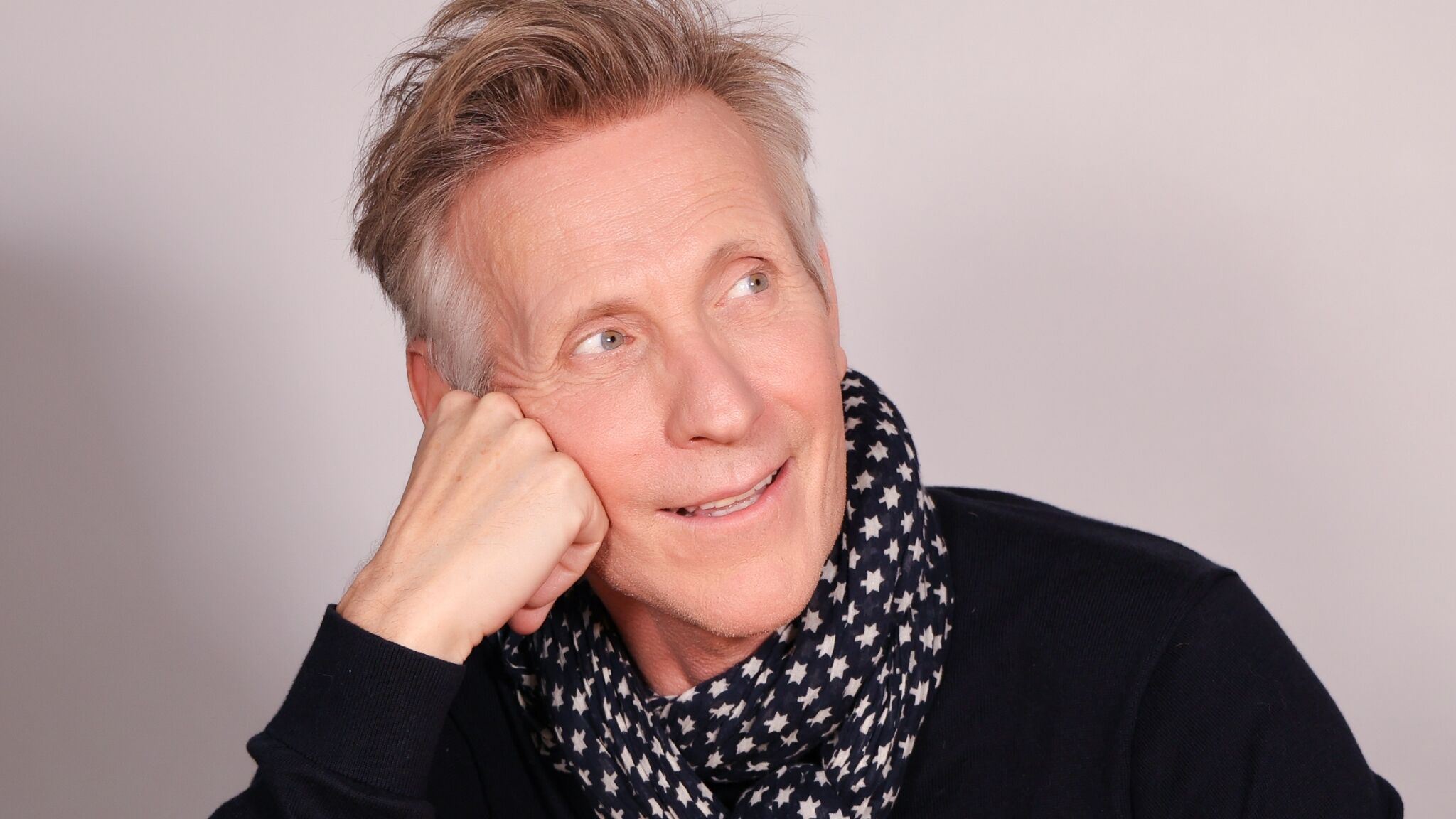
- Plastic Bertrand, in 2021

Background information
- Born: Roger François Jouret
- Origin: Brussels, Belgium
- Genres: Punk, new wave
- Instruments: Vocals, drums
- Years active: 1977–present
- Labels: Sire Records – 1978; RKM – 1979; Attic Records – 1980-84; RM Records – 2002
- Formerly of: Hubble Bubble
- Website: Plastic Bertrand.com

Roger François Jouret, better known as Plastic Bertrand, is a Belgian musician, songwriter, producer, editor and television presenter, best known for the 1977 international hit single "Ça plane pour moi".

== Biography ==
=== Early life and bands ===
Jouret was born in Brussels to a French father and Ukrainian mother. At the age of nine, he became a singer and drummer in the Buffalo Scouts Band, a group he formed with the Boy Scouts, which performed covers of Rolling Stones songs. He then formed a band called The Pelicans, which performed at parties. They changed their name to Passing the Time, presenting their act in bars, in clubs and at festivals along the Dutch and Belgian coasts. Later he was hired by pirate radio station Radio Veronica.

Meanwhile, he continued his education at the Music Academy studying music theory and percussion, passing his degree at the Athénée Adolphe Max. Whilst awaiting admission to the Royal Conservatory of Music in Brussels, he spent a year at the Saint-Luc Institute studying design.

In 1973, he entered the Conservatory to study music theory, percussion and music history. Influenced by the punk movement, he formed the band Hubble Bubble in 1974, sharing his time between study at the Conservatory, rehearsals and concerts with the band, and work as stage manager at the Theatre des Galeries. In 1975, Hubble Bubble released their first of two albums, also titled Hubble Bubble. Jouret is credited as the songwriter, singer and drummer under the name Roger Junior. The group's bass player was killed in an accident returning from a rehearsal, and the group disbanded.

=== As Plastic Bertrand ===
In 1977, the manager of Hubble Bubble, Bernard Schol, introduced Roger Jouret to Lou Deprijck, who had just written the music for what would become two songs, "Jet Boy, Jet Girl" with English lyrics, and "Ça plane pour moi" with mostly French lyrics. The French version became an international hit for Jouret, launching him as a solo artist under the new stage name of Plastic Bertrand.

In addition to being the song's co-writer and producer, Deprijck always maintained that he provided the vocals for the original recording, and the question remains controversial. In 2006 the Brussels court of appeal, upholding the decision of a lower court, found that Bertrand was the sole interpreter of the song. In 2010 an expert opinion produced for another case suggested the 1977 vocalist had a picard accent, like Deprijck's. This did not, however, alter the 2006 ruling, and media statements by Deprijk to the effect that his claim to be the singer had been "recognised by the justice system" were ill-founded. (All of the proceedings between 2006 and 2010 arose from disputes between the record company AMC, which owned the catalogue of Plastic Bertrand's Belgian label RKM, and Deprijck, whom it believed to be making inappropriate use of the material. Deprijck never took the question of who sang what to court himself.)

In an interview prompted by the 2010 episode, Bertrand appeared to admit that he was not the vocalist, but in a follow-up interview the next day he denied this, saying he was being ironic and had been trapped, and threatening legal action. This echoed a similar incident in the 1990s when Bertrand seemed to tell journalist Gilles Verlant that he was not the singer before quickly retracting. Since 2010, Bertrand has consistently said that he is the performer on the original recording, and this remains the position in law.

The song was recorded with the engineer Phil Delire for RKM/Vogue at Studio Morgan in Brussels. The English version, "Jet Boy, Jet Girl", with totally unrelated lyrics by Alan Ward — soon to become Elton Motello — appeared around the same time. Both recordings featured the same core group of session musicians.

Plastic Bertrand toured Europe, Japan, Australia and North America with Lou Deprijck, becoming one of the few French-speaking artists to appear in the Billboard chart. He also appeared on a number of major television shows, presenting Jackpot on TF1, Destination Noël on France 2, Due per tutti on Rai 2 and Supercool on RTBF, which he also produced.

Between 1982 and 1985, he lived in Milan, and millions of Italians followed his adventures in a photo-story of which he was the star. With Daniel Balavoine and ABBA's Anni-Frid Lyngstad, he recorded Abbacadabra, a musical tale for children. In the early 1980s, he appeared in movies such as Légitime violence and the short film Baoum. Working with Vladimir Cosma, he wrote several film scores, including Astérix et la surprise de César (Asterix Versus Caesar).

In 1987, he represented Luxembourg in the Eurovision Song Contest with the song "Amour, Amour". This failed to impress the juries, however, scoring only four points and placing 21st out of twenty-two entries.

During the 1990s, Bertrand explored other facets of music, including songwriting and producing, and also recorded the album Suite Diagonal for Sony in 1994 with Jacques Lanzmann. Forming the company MMD with Pierrette Broodthaers, he produced two albums for David Janssen, an album of classical music with a Turkish contemporary influence for harpsichord and organ with Leila Pinar, an album of traditional Balkan music with the Kazansky choir, and a single for Noël Godin, "Chantilly c'est parti". Bertrand's track "Stop ou encore" featured in the 1999 film Three Kings.

"Ça plane pour moi" is featured in the 1985 picture National Lampoon's European Vacation, in Danny Boyle's 2010 film 127 Hours, in 2011 as the opening title theme for Jackass 3.5 (2011), in the 2012 film Ruby Sparks, in the 2013 film The Wolf of Wall Street, and in the trailer for the 2018 film Super Troopers 2. The song is also used as the soundtrack for a commercial spot for Time Warner Cable in the United States (April 2011). A cover version was used in the 2018 video game, Just Dance 2019.

In 2023, Bertrand was a guest celebrity in the episode Snatch Game — Belgique Season 1 of the Belgian French-language reality television series Drag Race Belgique broadcast on the Tipik.

=== Comeback ===
Twenty years after "Ça plane pour moi", Bertrand returned to the public eye. He made a guest appearance on the album Get Ready!, and rerecorded the 1982 song "Stop ou encore", which went originally platinum in Belgium. A "best of" album was released in 1998 on the Universal-AMC label, Bertrand himself handling the remastering process.

Aside from a resurgence in his musical career, Plastic Bertrand made numerous guest appearances on European television, and presented the fortnightly show Duel for two seasons at RTBF. He also worked with Pierrette Broodthaers to open the "Broodthaers & Bertrand" art gallery, and worked with the Museum of Contemporary Art in Valenciennes and Belgian artist Jacques Charlier to produce 120 Andy Warhol-style portraits.

In 2001, Bertrand toured Belgium, France, Switzerland and Germany with a series of concerts, and composed a number of new songs. He also made appearances on Channel 4's Eurotrash show and BBC Two's chat show Clarkson.

In 2002, he signed a new contract and recorded his eighth album Ultra terrestre, released in Belgium in 2002. In September and November the same year, he managed the TV talent contest Star Academy on RTL-TVI.

In March 2003, to celebrate 25 years since the beginning of his successful solo career, Bertrand performed a concert at the Cirque Royal in Brussels, performing new songs and past hits with a philharmonic orchestra, and singing in duet with guest singers.

From July to September 2003, he presented the TV show Hit Story on France 3. During his comeback, he appeared on a special 1980s edition of Le Maillon Faible, the French equivalent of The Weakest Link. He won €1,150 for charity. He appeared at the Countdown Spectacular 2 Tour from 18 August to 5 September 2007 in all major capital cities of Australia.

== Discography ==
Preceded by Sherisse Laurence with "Sherisse Laurence"	Luxembourg in the Eurovision Song Contest; 1987	Succeeded by Lara Fabian with "Croire"
