= The Very Best of 1990–1997 =

The Very Best of 1990-1997

Compilation album by Dr. Alban
- Released: 30 June 1997

The Very Best Of 1990–1997 is a compilation album by Sweden-based Nigerian artist Dr. Alban released on 30 June 1997.

== Track listing ==
1. "Hello Afrika"
2. "Stop the Pollution" [Album Version]
3. "U & Mi" [Album Version]
4. "No Coke"
5. "One Love" [Radio Version]
6. "Sing Hallelujah"
7. "It's My Life"
8. "Look Who's Talking" [Long]
9. "Let the Beat Go On" [Short]
10. "Away from Home" [Short]
11. "This Time I'm Free" [Credibility Mix]
12. "Born in Africa"
13. "It's My Life" [Sash Remix]
14. "Sing Hallelujah" [DJ Stevie Steve's Pizzi Edit]
15. "Hello AfriKa" ['97 Remix]
16. "No Coke" [Klanghouse Remix]

== Charts ==
Chart performance for The Very Best Of 1990-1997
Chart (1997)	Peak Position
Austrian Albums (Ö3 Austria)	38
German Albums (Offizielle Top 100)	66
Swedish Albums (Sverigetopplistan)	38
