= One Love =

One Love may refer to:

== Music ==
- One Love (record producer), Timothy Sommers, American record producer, half of the duo Kinetics & One Love
- One Love: The Bob Marley Musical, a 2015 stage musical

=== Albums ===
- One Love (Blue album) or the title song (see below), 2002
- One Love (David Guetta album) or the title song (see below), 2009
- One Love (Delakota album), 1998
- One Love (Dr. Alban album) or the title song (see below), 1992
- One Love (Glay album) or the title song, 2001
- One Love (Kimberley Locke album), 2004
- One Love (New Edition album), 2004
- One Love (Tata Young album) or the title song, 2008
- One Love: The Very Best of Bob Marley & The Wailers or the title song (see below), 2001
- NME in Association with War Child Presents 1 Love, a 2002 charity compilation album

=== Songs ===
- "One Love/People Get Ready", by Bob Marley, 1965 and 1977
- "One Love" (A. R. Rahman song), 2007
- "One Love" (Arashi song), 2008
- "One Love" (Blue song), 2002
- "One Love" (Carlene Carter song), 1991
- "One Love" (Carpenters song), 1971
- "One Love" (David Guetta song), 2009
- "One Love" (Dr. Alban song), 1992
- "One Love" (Jennifer Lopez song), 2011
- "One Love" (Johnson & Häggkvist song), 2008
- "One Love" (Marianas Trench song), 2015
- "One Love" (Nas song), 1994
- "One Love" (The Prodigy song), 1993
- "One Love" (The Stone Roses song), 1990
- "One Love (No Question)", by Toshinori Yonekura, 2008
- "1 Luv", by E-40 from In a Major Way, 1995
- "1 Love", by Ayumi Hamasaki from Secret, 2006
- "One Love", by Aiden from Conviction, 2007
- "One Love", by Dohzi-T featuring Shimizu Shota, 2007
- "One Love", by Flobots from Flobots Present... Platypus, 2005
- "One Love", by Hootie & The Blowfish from Looking for Lucky, 2005
- "One Love", by Ian Dury & The Blockheads from Ten More Turnips from the Tip, 2002
- "One Love", by Jordan Pruitt from Permission to Fly, 2008
- "One Love", by Justin Bieber from Believe, 2012
- "One Love", by Massive Attack from Blue Lines, 1991
- "One Love", by The Outfield from Extra Innings, 1999
- "One Love", by Tess Mattisson, 2000
- "One Love", by Trey Songz from Ready, 2009
- "One Love", by Whodini from Back in Black, 1986
- "One Love", by Tzuyu from abouTZU, 2024

== Other uses ==
- One Love (2003 film), a Jamaican romance film
- Bob Marley: One Love, a 2024 American biographical film
- One Love, a 2010–2011 London art installation curated by Kilford
- OneLove human rights campaign
- One Love Party, a former political party in the United Kingdom

== See also ==
- Livity (spiritual concept), a concept of proper life based on Old Testament and African beliefs and traditions
- One Love Peace Concert, a large concert in 1978 in Kingston, Jamaica
- One Love Manchester, a 2017 concert in memory of the victims of the 2017 Manchester Attack in the UK
