= This Time I'm Free =

1995 single by Dr. Alban

Single by Dr. Alban

from the album Born in Africa
- Released: 1995
- Length: 3:49
- Label: BMG; Dr. Records; Tempo Records
- Songwriters: Dr. Alban; Ari Lehtonen; Jorge Vasconcelo
- Producers: Douglas Carr; Peo Häggström

Dr. Alban singles chronology
"Sweet Dreams" (1995)	"This Time I'm Free" (1995)	"Born in Africa" (1996)

Music video
- "This Time I'm Free" on YouTube

"This Time I'm Free" is a song by Sweden-based musician and producer Dr. Alban, released in 1995 by BMG, Dr. Records and Tempo Records as the first single from his fourth studio album, Born in Africa (1996). It features vocals by singer Martina Edoff and was co-written by Alban with Ari Lehtonen and Jorge Vasconcelo. Douglas Carr and Peo Häggström produced the song. It charted in many European countries, peaking at number two in Finland, number three in Sweden, number ten in Denmark and number eleven in Norway. On the Eurochart Hot 100, it reached number 22 in September 1995.

== Music video ==
The accompanying music video for "This Time I'm Free" was directed by Jonathan Bate. It was made in black-and-white and starts with the message "last year in Africa alone more than 12.000 people were held prisoner without charges - amnesty 1995". In the end, the message "freedom is a right and not a privilege" appear. The video was B-listed on German music television channel VIVA in September 1995. It was later made available in HD on Dr. Alban's official YouTube channel in 2011. Bate also directed the music videos for "Look Who's Talking", "Away from Home" and "Let the Beat Go On".

== Track listing ==
- CD single, France
1. "This Time I'm Free" (Credibility Mix) – 3:49
2. "This Time I'm Free" (StoneBridge & Nick Nice Anthem Mix) – 3:47
- CD maxi, Germany
1. "This Time I'm Free" (Credibility Mix) – 3:49
2. "This Time I'm Free" (Credibility Extended Mix) – 5:29
3. "This Time I'm Free" (StoneBridge & Nick Nice Big Mix) – 11:13
4. "This Time I'm Free" (StoneBridge & Nick Nice Anthem Mix) – 6:56
5. "This Time I'm Free" (Alternative Breakbeat Mix) – 5:37

== Charts ==
=== Weekly charts ===
Chart (1995)	Peak position
Austria (Ö3 Austria Top 40)	23
Belgium (Ultratop 50 Flanders)	21
Belgium (Ultratop 50 Wallonia)	20
Denmark (IFPI)	10
Europe (Eurochart Hot 100)	22
Europe (European Dance Radio)	3
Finland (Suomen virallinen lista)	1
Germany (GfK)	27
Iceland (Íslenski Listinn Topp 40)	35
Israel (Israeli Singles Chart)	12
Netherlands (Dutch Top 40 Tipparade)	2
Netherlands (Single Top 100)	35
Norway (VG-lista)	11
Sweden (Sverigetopplistan)	3
Switzerland (Schweizer Hitparade)	32

=== Year-end charts ===
Chart (1995)	Position
Europe (European Dance Radio)	13
Sweden (Topplistan)	37

== La Cream version ==
"Free"

Single by La Cream

from the album Sound & Vision
- Released: 1999
- Length: 3:20
- Label: CNR Music; Dr. Records
- Songwriters: Dr. Alban; Ari Lehtonen
- Producers: Ferari Zand; Dr. Alban

La Cream singles chronology
"Say Goodbye" (1999)	"Free" (1999)

Music video
- "Free" on YouTube

In 1999, Swedish Eurodance band La Cream released a cover on the song, as "Free". It was released by CNR Music and Dr. Record sas the fourth single from their debut album, Sound & Vision (1998). Dr. Alban produced the song with Ferari Zand, and this version peaked at number 12 in Sweden, with a total of six weeks on the chart. The accompanying music video was filmed in Mallorca, Spain and depicts singer Tess Mattisson escaping from a prison cell.

=== Charts ===
Chart (1999)	Peak position
Finland (Rumba)	31
Sweden (Sverigetopplistan)	12
