= Born in Africa =

Born in Africa may refer to:

- Born in Africa (Dr. Alban album), 1996
  - Born in Africa (song)
- Born in Africa (compilation album), 1986 compilation album of various Ugandan artists
