= U & Mi =

Single by Dr Alban

from the album Hello Afrika
- Released: 1991
- Genre: House; tribal
- Length: 3:28
- Label: Logic Records; SweMix Records
- Songwriters: Dr Alban; Denniz PoP
- Producer: Denniz PoP

Dr Alban singles chronology
"No Coke" (1990)	"U & Mi" (1991)	"(Sing Shi-Wo-Wo) Stop the Pollution" (1991)

Music video
- "U & Mi" on YouTube

"U & Mi" is a song by Sweden-based musician and producer Dr Alban, released in 1991 by Logic and SweMix Records as the third single from his debut album, Hello Afrika (1990). It was the follow-up to his successful single, "No Coke" and became a notable hit in several countries. Produced by Denniz Pop, who also co-wrote it with Dr. Alban, it became a top-10 hit in Finland, Portugal and Switzerland, and a top-20 hit in Austria, Germany, Spain and Sweden.

== Critical reception ==
In May 1991, pan-European magazine Music & Media commented, "New recipe from the same private practice. For the follow-up to 'Hello Afrika' and 'No Coke' the Swedish bush doctor has added a spoonful of Real Milli Vanilli to his magic potion. Top-40 programmers must take a shot of it."

== Track listing ==
- 7" single, Sweden (1991)
1. "U & Mi" (The 7" Radiomix)
2. "U & Mi" (The 7" Dancemix)
- 12" single, Sweden (1991)
1. "U & Mi" (The 12" Dancemix) – 5:13
2. "U & Mi" (The 7" Radiomix) – 3:27
3. "U & Mi" (The Gregorian Mix) – 4:18
4. "U & Mi" (The Gregorian Dub) – 4:00
5. "U & Mi" (The Techno Mix) – 7:12
- CD maxi, Germany (1991)
1. "U & Mi" (Eee-Motion Mix) – 6:30
2. "U & Mi" (Swe&Me Mix) – 5:11
3. "U & Mi" (Swe-Tech Mix) – 7:11

== Charts ==
Chart (1991)	Peak position
Austria (Ö3 Austria Top 40)	11
Europe (Eurochart Hot 100)	50
Finland (Suomen virallinen lista)	6
Germany (GfK)	14
Portugal (AFP)	10
Spain (AFYVE)	15
Sweden (Sverigetopplistan)	20
Switzerland (Schweizer Hitparade)	9
