= Look Who's Talking (disambiguation) =

Look Who's Talking is a 1989 film starring John Travolta and Kirstie Alley.

Look Who's Talking may also refer to:

- Look Who's Talking (album), a 1994 album by Dr. Alban
- "Look Who's Talking" (song), a 1994 song by Dr. Alban
- Look Who's Talking (horse), a racehorse
- "Look Who's Talking", a 2008 song by BoA from BoA

== See also ==
- Look Who's Talking Too, a 1990 film
- Look Who's Talking Now, a 1993 film
