= You (La Cream song) =

Single by La Cream

from the album Sound & Vision
- B-side: "Remix"
- Released: 1998
- Genre: Eurodance; trance
- Length: 3:06
- Label: Arcade; Dr. Records
- Songwriters: Ari Lehtonen; Jorge Vasconcelo; Andréz Abatte; Freddie Hogblad
- Producers: Ari Lehtonen; Andréz Abatte; Freddie Hogblad

La Cream singles chronology
"Château d'Amour" (1998)	"You" (1998)	"Say Goodbye" (1998)

Music video
- "You" on YouTube

"You" is a song recorded by Swedish Eurodance band La Cream, released in late 1998, by Arcade and Dr. Records, as the second single from their only album, Sound & Vision (1998). The song is sung by lead vocalist Tess Mattisson and also features some French lyrics. It was a hit on the charts in Scandinavia, peaking at number three in Norway, number 11 in Finland and number 12 in Sweden. Executive producer is Dr. Alban. The accompanying music video was shot in Stockholm, Sweden, featuring Mattisson performing inside several rooms of the Stockholm City Hall. "You" earned a gold record in both Norway and Sweden. Pan-European magazine Music & Media wrote in their review, "This Swedish duo consists of singer/dancer Tess—who has worked with Dr. Alban, Basic Element and Dromhus—and DJ/rapper Andrez who has considerable club experience. Together they have come up with a potent slice of Eurodance. The song is already doing very well in Sweden and Norway, and it has the potential to repeat that success elsewhere."

== Track listing ==
- 12", Sweden
1. "You" (Extended Mix) – 4:42
2. "You" (Nello's 303 Mix) – 4:57
3. "You" (2 PN's French Mix) – 5:52
4. "You" (Freddie's Tribal Mix) – 4:49
- CD single, France
1. "You" (Radio Edit) – 3:06
2. "You" (Nello's 303 Mix) – 4:57
- CD maxi, Scandinavia
1. "You" (Radio Edit) – 3:06
2. "You" (Extended Mix) – 4:42
3. "You" (Nello's 303 Mix) – 4:57
4. "You" (2 PN's French Mix) – 5:55
5. "You" (Freddie's Tribal Mix) – 4:49

== Charts ==
=== Weekly charts ===
Chart (1998)	Peak position
Finland (Suomen virallinen lista)	11
Norway (VG-lista)	3
Sweden (Sverigetopplistan)	12

=== Year-end charts ===
Chart (1998)	Position
Sweden (Sverigetopplistan)	66

== Certifications ==
Region	Certification	Certified units/sales
Norway (IFPI Norway)	Gold	
Sweden (GLF)	Gold	15,000^{^}
^{^} Shipments figures based on certification alone.
