= List of number-one hits of 1991 (Austria) =

This is a list of the Austrian Singles Chart number-one hits of 1991.

Issue date	Song	Artist
6 January	"Sadeness (Part I)"	Enigma
13 January	"Sadeness (Part I)"	Enigma
20 January	"Sadeness (Part I)"	Enigma
27 January	"Sadeness (Part I)"	Enigma
3 February	"Unchained Melody"	The Righteous Brothers
10 February	"Unchained Melody"	The Righteous Brothers
17 February	"Unchained Melody"	The Righteous Brothers
24 February	"Unchained Melody"	The Righteous Brothers
3 March	"Unchained Melody"	The Righteous Brothers
10 March	"Unchained Melody"	The Righteous Brothers
17 March	"Hello Afrika"	Dr. Alban featuring Leila K.
24 March	"Gonna Make You Sweat (Everybody Dance Now)"	C+C Music Factory featuring Freedom Williams
31 March	"Joyride"	Roxette
7 April	"Joyride"	Roxette
14 April	"Joyride"	Roxette
21 April	"Joyride"	Roxette
28 April	"Joyride"	Roxette
5 May	"Joyride"	Roxette
12 May	"Joyride"	Roxette
19 May	"Joyride"	Roxette
26 May	"Joyride"	Roxette
2 June	"Joyride"	Roxette
9 June	"The One and Only"	Chesney Hawkes
16 June	"The Shoop Shoop Song (It's in His Kiss)"	Cher
23 June	"The Shoop Shoop Song (It's in His Kiss)"	Cher
30 June	"The Shoop Shoop Song (It's in His Kiss)"	Cher
7 July	"Wind of Change"	Scorpions
14 July	"Wind of Change"	Scorpions
21 July	"Wind of Change"	Scorpions
28 July	"Wind of Change"	Scorpions
4 August	"Wind of Change"	Scorpions
11 August	"Wind of Change"	Scorpions
18 August	"Wind of Change"	Scorpions
25 August	"Wind of Change"	Scorpions
1 September	"Wind of Change"	Scorpions
8 September	"Bacardi Feeling (Summer Dreamin')"	Kate Yanai
15 September	"Do the Limbo Dance"	David Hasselhoff
22 September	"Bacardi Feeling (Summer Dreamin')"	Kate Yanai
29 September	"(Everything I Do) I Do It for You"	Bryan Adams
6 October	"(Everything I Do) I Do It for You"	Bryan Adams
13 October	"(Everything I Do) I Do It for You"	Bryan Adams
20 October	"(Everything I Do) I Do It for You"	Bryan Adams
27 October	"(Everything I Do) I Do It for You"	Bryan Adams
3 November	"(Everything I Do) I Do It for You"	Bryan Adams
10 November	"(Everything I Do) I Do It for You"	Bryan Adams
17 November	"Let's Talk About Sex"	Salt-n-Pepa
24 November	"Let's Talk About Sex"	Salt-n-Pepa
1 December	"Let's Talk About Sex"	Salt-n-Pepa
8 December	"Let's Talk About Sex"	Salt-n-Pepa
15 December	"Let's Talk About Sex"	Salt-n-Pepa
22 December	"Let's Talk About Sex"	Salt-n-Pepa
29 December	"Let's Talk About Sex"	Salt-n-Pepa

== See also ==
- 1991 in music
