= Hallelujah Day =

Single by Dr. Alban

from the album Born in Africa
- Released: 1996
- Genre: Reggae; dub
- Length: 3:39
- Label: BMG; Dr. Records
- Songwriters: Dr. Alban; Larry'n'Mike
- Producers: Peo Häggström; Per Adebratt; Tommy Ekman

Dr. Alban singles chronology
"Born in Africa" (1996)	"Hallelujah Day" (1996)	"Mr. DJ" (1997)

Music video
- "Hallelujah Day" on YouTube

"Hallelujah Day" is a song by Sweden-based musician and producer Dr. Alban, released in 1996 by BMG and Dr. Records as the third single from Alban's fourth studio album, Born in Africa (1996). The song is co-written by Alban and produced by Peo Häggström, Per Adebratt and Tommy Ekman. It was a top-20 hit in Finland, a top-30 hit in Sweden and a top-40 hit in Austria. The accompanying music video was directed by Joakim Sandström.

== Track listing ==
- 12", Italy
1. "Hallelujah Day" (Extended Mix) — 5:43
2. "Hallelujah Day" (Pierre J's Roots Radio Remix) — 3:36
3. "Hallelujah Day" (Pierre J's Roots Remix) — 6:20
4. "Hallelujah Day" (Radio Edit) — 3:39
- CD single, Sweden
1. "Hallelujah Day" (Radio) — 3:39
2. "Hallelujah Day" (Pierre J's Roots Radio Remix) — 3:36
- CD maxi, Germany
1. "Hallelujah Day" (Radio) — 3:39
2. "Hallelujah Day" (Pierre J's Roots Radio Remix) — 3:36
3. "Hallelujah Day" (Extended) — 5:43
4. "Hallelujah Day" (Pierre J's Roots Remix) — 6:20

== Charts ==
Chart (1996)	Peak position
Austria (Ö3 Austria Top 40)	35
Europe (European Dance Radio)	21
Finland (Suomen virallinen lista)	12
Sweden (Sverigetopplistan)	30
