= No Coke =

1990 single by Dr. Alban

Single by Dr. Alban

from the album Hello Afrika
- Released: 3 November 1990
- Genre: Dancehall; reggae
- Length: 7:00 (album version); 3:43
- Label: SweMix
- Songwriters: Dr. Alban; Denniz PoP
- Producer: Denniz PoP

Dr. Alban singles chronology
"Hello Afrika" (1990)	"No Coke" (1990)	"U & Mi" (1991)

Music video
- "No Coke" on YouTube

"No Coke" is a song recorded by Sweden-based musician and producer Dr. Alban. It was originally released as the B-side of the 12-inch version of his debut single, "Hello Afrika", and became the second single off his debut album, Hello Afrika (1990). Released in November 1990 by label SweMix, it became a hit in several European countries and reached number one in Sweden. To date, "No Coke" is one of Dr. Alban's most successful songs, along with "It's My Life" and "Sing Hallelujah". It was co-written and produced by Denniz Pop, who recorded the song's signature bassline using a Roland Juno-106 synthesizer. The song is performed in English, and the lyrics describe a tragic event outside Dr. Alban's nightclub Alphabet Street in Stockholm. In November 2017, it was the topic of SVT's Hitlåtens historia.

== Critical reception ==
Larry Flick from Billboard magazine named the song a "cleverly written anti-drug anthem", "particularly potent and U.S. club-friendly." He added that "pure (and clever) toasting is woven into a fabric of accessible hip-hop and reggae threads" and concluded that the song is "a brilliant piece of work".

== Chart performance ==
"No Coke" was successful on the charts in Europe, peaking at number-one in Sweden. It spent two weeks at the top spot and 5 weeks within the top 10 of Sverigetopplistan. The single became a top-10 hit also in Austria (2), Germany, Greece (3), the Netherlands, Norway, Portugal, Spain and Switzerland (3). In Austria, it peaked at number two, being held off reaching number-one by Roxette's "Joyride". It spent four weeks at that position on the Schweizer Hitparade.

Additionally, "No Coke" was a top-20 hit in Finland and Italy, and a top-30 hit in Belgium. It didn't chart on the UK Singles Chart, but reached number 59 on the UK Dance Singles Chart. Outside Europe, it became successful also in Latin America, reaching number two in Peru. The single earned a gold record in Sweden, where the song broke all records by staying for five consecutive weeks at number-one in national radio SR's popular show "Tracks". That's a feat not even achieved by ABBA.

== Music video ==
A music video was produced to promote the single, directed by Scottish director Paul Boyd. He also directed the video for "Hello Afrika". "No Coke" received heavy rotation on MTV Europe, and was later made available on Dr. Alban's official YouTube channel in December 2011, having generated more than 37 million views by May 2025.

== Track listings ==
- 7" single
1. "No Coke" (radio mix) — 3:43
2. "No Coke" (swe-flow-mix) — 3:50
- CD single
1. "No Coke" (radio mix) — 3:43
2. "No Coke" (swe-flow-mix) — 3:50

== Charts ==
=== Weekly charts ===
Chart (1990–1993)	Peak position
Austria (Ö3 Austria Top 40)	2
Belgium (Ultratop 50 Flanders)	26
Europe (Eurochart Hot 100)	8
Finland (Suomen virallinen lista)	12
Germany (GfK)	3
Greece (IFPI)	3
Italy (Musica e dischi)	18
Netherlands (Dutch Top 40)	7
Netherlands (Single Top 100)	7
Norway (VG-lista)	6
Peru (UPI)	2
Portugal (AFP)	6
Spain (AFYVE)	7
Sweden (Sverigetopplistan)	1
Switzerland (Schweizer Hitparade)	3
UK Dance (Music Week)	59

=== Year-end charts ===
Chart (1990)	Position
Sweden (Topplistan)	9

Chart (1991)	Position
Austria (Ö3 Austria Top 40)	18
Europe (Eurochart Hot 100)	34
Germany (Media Control)	22
Netherlands (Dutch Top 40)	79
Netherlands (Single Top 100)	53
Sweden (Topplistan)	63
Switzerland (Schweizer Hitparade)	23

== Certifications ==
Region	Certification	Certified units/sales
Sweden (GLF)	Platinum	50,000^{^}
^{^} Shipments figures based on certification alone.
