= Feel the Rhythm (song) =

Single by Dr. Alban

from the album I Believe
- B-side: "Honey Bunny"
- Released: 1998
- Genre: Eurodance
- Length: 3:21
- Label: CNR Music
- Songwriters: Dr. Alban; Jorge Vasconcelo; Per Adebratt; Tommy Ekman
- Producers: Per Adebratt; Tommy Ekman

Dr. Alban singles chronology
"Long Time Ago" (1997)	"Feel the Rhythm" (1998)	"Colour the World" (1999)

Music video
- "Feel the Rhythm" on YouTube

"Feel the Rhythm" is a song by Sweden-based musician and producer Dr. Alban, released in 1998 by CNR Music as the fourth and last single from Alban's fifth studio album, I Believe (1997). The song features backing vocals by Monica Löfgren, and is written by Alban with Jorge Vasconcelo and the songs producers, Per Adebratt and Tommy Ekman. "Feel the Rhythm" became a top-20 hit in Spain, peaking at number 13. In Alban's native Sweden, the song peaked at number 56.

== Track listing ==
- 12" single, Spain
1. "Feel the Rhythm" (Blue Ocean Mix) — 3:24
2. "Feel the Rhythm" (Honey Bunny) — 3:18
3. "Feel the Rhythm" (Booster & DJ Martin) — 3:25
4. "Feel the Rhythm" (2 Phat Mix) — 3:52
5. "Feel the Rhythm" (Radio Edit) — 3:21
- CD single, Europe
1. "Feel the Rhythm" (Radio Edit) — 3:21
2. "Honey Bunny" — 3:28
- CD maxi, Sweden
1. "Feel the Rhythm" (Blue Ocean Mix) — 3:34
2. "Feel the Rhythm" (Booster & DJ Martin Mix) — 3:25
3. "Feel the Rhythm" (2 Phat Mix) — 3:52
4. "Feel the Rhythm" (Radio Edit) — 3:21

== Charts ==
Chart (1998)	Peak position
Spain (AFYVE)	13
Sweden (Sverigetopplistan)	56
