= The Ride (Basic Element song) =

Single by Basic Element

from the album The Ultimate Ride
- Released: 1994
- Genre: Eurodance
- Length: 4:08
- Label: EMI Inhouse
- Songwriter(s): Cesar Zamini; Peter Thelenius; Stefan Andersson
- Producer(s): Stefan Andersson

Basic Element singles chronology
"The Promise Man" (1993)	"The Ride" (1994)	"The Fiddle" (1994)

Music video
- "The Ride" on YouTube

"The Ride" is a song by Swedish band Basic Element featuring new member Saunet Sparell on vocals. The song was released as the first single from Basic Element's second album, The Ultimate Ride (1995). It was successful in Scandinavia, peaking at number two in both Sweden and Finland and reaching number five in Denmark. A music video was produced to promote the single, featuring Sparell as a villain that has kidnapped the guys of the band and is transporting them to somewhere on a speedboat.

== Track listings ==
12-inch, Sweden (1994)
No.	Title	Length
1.	"The Ride" (Sex-ride mix)	5:40
2.	"The Ride" (instrumental)	4:08
3.	"The Ride" (radio edit)	4:08
4.	"The Ride" (a cappella version)	1:56

CD single, Sweden (1994)
No.	Title	Length
1.	"The Ride" (radio edit)	4:08
2.	"The Ride" (instrumental)	4:08

CD maxi, Sweden (1994)
No.	Title	Length
1.	"The Ride" (radio edit)	4:08
2.	"The Ride" (Sex-Ride mix)	5:40
3.	"The Ride" (instrumental)	4:08
4.	"The Ride" (a cappella)	1:56

== Charts ==
=== Weekly charts ===
Chart (1994–1995)	Peak position
Denmark (IFPI)	5
Europe (Eurochart Hot 100)	20
Finland (Suomen virallinen lista)	2
Sweden (Sverigetopplistan)	2

=== Year-end charts ===
Chart (1995)	Position
Sweden (Topplistan)	24
