= (Sing Shi-Wo-Wo) Stop the Pollution =

Single by Dr Alban

from the album Hello Afrika
- Released: 1991
- Genre: House
- Length: 4:02
- Label: Logic; SweMix
- Songwriters: Dr Alban; Denniz PoP
- Producer: Denniz PoP

Dr Alban singles chronology
"U & Mi" (1991)	"(Sing Shi-Wo-Wo) Stop the Pollution" (1991)	"It's My Life" (1992)

Music video
- "(Sing Shi-Wo-Wo) Stop the Pollution" on YouTube

"(Sing Shi-Wo-Wo) Stop the Pollution" is a song by Sweden-based musician and producer Dr Alban, released in 1991, by Logic and SweMix Records, as the fourth and last single from his debut album, Hello Afrika (1990). It was written by Alban and its producer Denniz PoP, and became a moderate hit in Europe, peaking at number two and three in Greece and Finland. Additionally, it was a top-20 hit in both Switzerland and Austria. The accompanying music video was directed by Patric Ullaeus and produced by Revolver Film Company.

== Track listing ==
- 12" single, Sweden (1991)
1. "(Sing Shi-Wo-Wo) Stop the Pollution" (Long Version) – 6:39
2. "(Sing Shi-Wo-Wo) Stop the Pollution" (Dub Version) – 3:06
3. "(Sing Shi-Wo-Wo) Stop the Pollution" (Radio Version) – 3:59
4. "Wo-Wo-Music" (Wo-Wo Version) – 4:17
- CD maxi, Scandinavia (1991)
1. "(Sing Shi-Wo-Wo) Stop the Pollution" (Radio Version) – 4:02
2. "(Sing Shi-Wo-Wo) Stop the Pollution" (12" Original Mix) – 6:42
3. "(Sing Shi-Wo-Wo) Stop the Pollution" (Dub Version) – 3:09
4. "Wo-Wo Music" (Radio Version) – 4:20
5. "Groove Machine 2" (The Long Version) – 6:30

== Charts ==
Chart (1991)	Peak position
Austria (Ö3 Austria Top 40)	16
Europe (Eurochart Hot 100)	83
Finland (Suomen virallinen lista)	3
Greece (IFPI)	2
Sweden (Sverigetopplistan)	36
Switzerland (Schweizer Hitparade)	13
