= Born in Africa (song) =

Single by Dr. Alban

from the album Born in Africa
- Released: 1996
- Studio: Dr. Records Studio
- Genre: Eurohouse; reggae
- Length: 3:30
- Label: Dr. Records; Tempo Records
- Songwriters: Dr. Alban; Ari Lehtonen; Jorge Vasconcelo
- Producers: Douglas Carr; Peo Häggström

Dr. Alban singles chronology
"This Time I'm Free" (1995)	"Born in Africa" (1996)	"Hallelujah Day" (1996)

Music video
- "Born in Africa" on YouTube

"Born in Africa" is a song recorded by Sweden-based musician and producer Dr. Alban, released in 1996 by Dr. Records and Tempo Records as the second single from Alban's fourth studio album, Born in Africa (1996). The song was written by Alban with Ari Lehtonen and Jorge Vasconcelo, and produced by Douglas Carr and Peo Häggström. It peaked at number-one in Finland, number seven in Hungary and number eleven in Sweden, as well as topping the Swedish dance chart, with a total of 11 weeks inside that chart. On the Eurochart Hot 100, "Born in Africa" reached number 91 in April 1996.

== Critical reception ==
Pan-European magazine Music & Media wrote, "It's not often that remixes make a difference, but in this you get two radio hits for the price of one. The original radio version has an up-tempo reggae rhythm and a poppy chorus, while Pierre J's Radio Remix is fast, hard techno with exotic background vocals and dubs."

== Track listing ==
- CD single, Germany
1. "Born in Africa" (Original Radio Version) — 3:30
2. "Born in Africa" (Pierre J's Radio Remix) — 3:40
- CD maxi, Europe
1. "Born in Africa" (Original Radio Version) — 3:30
2. "Born in Africa" (Pierre J's Radio Remix) — 3:40
3. "Born in Africa" (Extended Version) — 4:57
4. "Born in Africa" (Pierre J's Remix) — 5:59
5. "Born in Africa" (Dog'n Peo Club Soda Mix) — 4:53
6. "Born in Africa" (Dog'n Peo Cocktail Dub) — 5:36
7. "Born in Africa" (2 Phat Mix) — 4:26

== Charts ==
=== Weekly charts ===
Chart (1996)	Peak position
Austria (Ö3 Austria Top 40)	31
Estonia (Eesti Top 20)	13
Europe (Eurochart Hot 100)	91
Europe (European Dance Radio)	16
Finland (Suomen virallinen lista)	1
Hungary (Mahasz)	7
Israel (Israeli Singles Chart)	20
Latvia (Latvijas Top 30)	11
Sweden (Sverigetopplistan)	11
Sweden (Swedish Dance Chart)	1
Switzerland (Schweizer Hitparade)	47

=== Year-end charts ===
Chart (1996)	Position
Latvia (Latvijas Top 30)	109
Sweden (Topplistan)	100
Sweden (Swedish Dance Chart)	13
