= Long Time Ago =

Single by Dr. Alban

from the album I Believe
- Released: 1997
- Studio: Dr. Records
- Genre: Progressive house; trance
- Length: 4:12
- Label: CNR Music
- Songwriters: Dr. Alban; Jay Balmorian; Richie Balmorian; Robert Uhlmann; Robin Rex; Victor Salazar
- Producers: Ari Lehtonen; Charlie King

Dr. Alban singles chronology
"Mr. DJ" (1997)	"Long Time Ago" (1997)	"Feel the Rhythm" (1998)

Music video
- "Long Time Ago" on YouTube

"Long Time Ago" is a song by Sweden-based musician and producer Dr. Alban, released in 1997 by CNR Music as the third single from his fifth studio album, I Believe (1997). It has been described as a typical Dr. Alban song, but updated to incorporate more progressive house and trance. The song is co-written by Allban and produced by Ari Lehtonen and Charlie King. It peaked at number 15 in both Finland and Spain. Backing vocals are performed by Charlie King, Martina Edoff, Monica Lofgren and Therese Grankvist. German DJ/production team Sash! made remixes of the track.

== Track listing ==
12-inch single, Europe
No.	Title	Length
1.	"Long Time Ago" (Sash! extended)	5:08
2.	"Long Time Ago" (album version)	3:27

CD single, Europe
No.	Title	Length
1.	"Long Time Ago" (Bundes radio mix)	4:12
2.	"Long Time Ago" (Sash! mix)	3:08

CD maxi, Germany
No.	Title	Length
1.	"Long Time Ago" (Bundes radio mix)	4:12
2.	"Long Time Ago" (Sash! mix)	3:08
3.	"Long Time Ago" (album version)	3:27
4.	"Long Time Ago" (Sash! extended)	5:08
5.	"Long Time Ago" (Ari's Dr. Records remix)	4:24

== Charts ==
Chart (1997–1998)	Peak position
Finland (Suomen virallinen lista)	15
Spain (AFYVE)	15
Sweden (Sverigetopplistan)	55
