= Let the Beat Go On =

Single by Dr. Alban

from the album Look Who's Talking
- Released: August 1994
- Recorded: 1994
- Studio: Cheiron
- Genre: Eurodance; dancehall
- Length: 4:03; 5:28 (extended)
- Songwriters: Dr. Alban; Kristian Lundin; John Amatiello
- Producers: Dr. Alban; Kristian Lundin; John Amatiello

Dr. Alban singles chronology
"Away from Home" (1994)	"Let the Beat Go On" (1994)	"Sweet Dreams" (1995)

Music video
- "Let the Beat Go On" on YouTube

"Let the Beat Go On" is a song recorded by Swedish musician and producer Dr. Alban. It was released by Cheiron in August 1994 as the third single from Alban's third studio album, Look Who's Talking (1994). The song is written and produced by Alban with Kristian Lundin and John Amatiello, and the chorus is sung by Swedish singers Nana Hedin and Jessica Folcker. It charted in many European countries, peaking at number-one in Spain, number three in Finland and number nine in Belgium. Jonathan Bate directed the accompanying music video, featuring Alban performing on a green grassmat, amidst female guitarists or sunflowers.

== Critical reception ==
Larry Flick from Billboard magazine wrote that Dr. Alban "should easily match the success of the previous 'Away from Home' with this jaunty ditty, which combines elements of pop/rave, hi-NRG, and electro-trance. His tense vocal snaps over a twinkling array of keyboards that will remind some of vintage Giorgio Moroder. Behind the frenzied vocal/synth action is a giddy pop chorus that never leaves the brain after the first spin. Those who like to hang onto the cutting edge will probably prefer the riotous Jungle Speed mix. A gem from the set Look Who's Talking." Pan-European magazine Music & Media noted, "Probably the doctor's most one-dimensional Euro effort ever, he'll get automatic daytime airplay anyway because of the simple, unavoidable melody."

== Chart performance ==
"Let the Beat Go On" enjoyed moderate success in many European countries, although it didn't reach the same level of success as "It's My Life", "Sing Hallelujah" and "Look Who's Talking". The song peaked at number-one in Spain, where it spent one week atop the Spanish singles chart and further two weeks as number two. It also entered the top 10 in Finland (3) and Belgium (9).

Additionally, the single was a top-20 hit in France (12), Germany (18), the Netherlands (19) and Sweden (17), as well as on the Eurochart Hot 100, where it reached number 19. On the European Dance Radio Chart, it almost peaked atop, reaching number two, becoming the second most-played dance song on European radio that week. Outside Europe, "Let the Beat Go On" peaked at number eight on the RPM Dance/Urban chart in Canada and number 186 in Australia.

== Music video ==
The music video for "Let the Beat Go On" was directed by Jonathan Bate. It depicts Dr. Alban performing behind a microphone, standing amidst female guitarists on a green grassmat in front of a blue backdrop. Sometimes he is surrounded by yellow sunflowers. In between, different characters appears on the grass, such as a dog with its doghouse, children playing, male and female gymnasts, and a crowd of females dancing. In the beginning of the video, the picture is shown upside down. "Let the Beat Go On" received "prime break out" rotation on MTV Europe in October 1994. Same month, it was B-listed on German music television channel VIVA. In January 1995, the video was A-listed on France's MCM. It was nominated in the category for Best Swedish Dance Video 1994 at the 1995 Swedish Dance Music Awards. "Let the Beat Go On" was later made available on Dr. Alban's official YouTube channel in 2011, and had generated more than 10 million views as of July 2025. Bate had previously directed the videos for "Look Who's Talking" and "Away from Home".

== Track listings ==
- 7" single, Europe (1994)
1. "Let The Beat Go On" (Short) — 4:03
2. "Let The Beat Go On" (DinDogAmaDub) — 5:26
- 12" single, Europe (1994)
1. " Let The Beat Go On" (Long) — 5:28
2. " Let The Beat Go On" (Dindogamadub) — 5:26
- CD single, France (1994)
1. "Let the Beat Go On" (Short) — 4:03
2. "Let the Beat Go On" (Long) — 5:28
- CD maxi, Europe (1994)
1. "Let the Beat Go On" (Short) — 4:03
2. "Let the Beat Go On" (Long) — 5:28
3. "Let the Beat Go On" (Jungle Speed) — 5:27
4. "Let the Beat Go On" (Dingogamadub) — 5:26
- CD maxi, US (1995)
1. "Let The Beat Go On (Short) — 4:03
2. "Let The Beat Go On (House Of Peo Single Mix) — 4:12
3. "Let The Beat Go On (Long) — 5:28
4. "Let The Beat Go On (House Of Peo Extended Club Mix) — 5:42
5. "Let The Beat Go On (Jungle Speed) — 5:27
6. "Let The Beat Go On (Dindogamadub) — 5:26

== Charts ==
=== Weekly charts ===
Chart (1994)	Peak position
Australia (ARIA)	186
Austria (Ö3 Austria Top 40)	23
Belgium (Ultratop 50 Flanders)	9
Belgium (VRT Top 30 Flanders)	9
Canada Dance/Urban (RPM)	8
Europe (Eurochart Hot 100)	19
Europe (European Dance Radio)	2
Finland (Suomen virallinen lista)	3
France (SNEP)	12
Germany (GfK)	18
Netherlands (Dutch Top 40)	22
Netherlands (Single Top 100)	19
Spain (AFYVE)	1
Sweden (Sverigetopplistan)	17
US Dance Club Play (Billboard)	7
US Maxi-Singles Sales (Billboard)	22

=== Year-end charts ===
Chart (1994)	Position
Belgium (Ultratop Flanders)	52
Netherlands (Dutch Top 40)	157

Chart (1995)	Position
Latvia (Latvijas Top 50)	173
