= Say Goodbye (La Cream song) =

Single by La Cream

from the album Sound & Vision
- B-side: "Remix"
- Released: 1999
- Genre: Eurodance; trance
- Length: 3:21
- Label: CNR Records; Dr. Records
- Songwriters: Ari Lehtonen; Andréz Abatte; Freddie Hogblad; Tess Mattisson
- Producers: Ari Lehtonen; Andréz Abatte; Freddie Hogblad

La Cream singles chronology
"You" (1998)	"Say Goodbye" (1999)	"Free" (1999)

Music video
- "Say Goodbye" on YouTube

"Say Goodbye" is a song recorded by Swedish Eurodance band La Cream and released in 1999 by CNR Records and Dr. Records as the third single from their only album, Sound & Vision (1999). It was successful on the charts in Scandinavia, peaking at number five in Finland, number nine in Norway, number 17 in Denmark and number 21 in Sweden. The song is sung by lead vocalist Tess Mattisson, who also co-wrote it with producers Ari Lehtonen, Andréz Abatte and Freddie Hogblad. The accompanying music video depicts Mattisson performing inside an ice castle.

== Track listing ==
12", Canada
No.	Title	Length
1.	"Say Goodbye" (Extended Mix)	6:06
2.	"Say Goodbye" (M12's Majestic Club Mix)	6:30
3.	"Say Goodbye" (Nello's Hardfloor Mix)	7:23
4.	"Say Goodbye" (La Cream's Dub Mix)	6:25

12" maxi, Italy
No.	Title	Length
1.	"Say Goodbye" (M12s Majestic Club Mix)	6:06
2.	"Say Goodbye" (Radio Edit)	6:30
3.	"Say Goodbye" (Extended Mix)	7:23

CD maxi, Scandinavia
No.	Title	Length
1.	"Say Goodbye" (Radio Edit)	3:21
2.	"Say Goodbye" (Extended Mix)	6:08
3.	"Say Goodbye" (M12's Majestic Club Mix)	6:30
4.	"Say Goodbye" (Nello's Hardfloor Remix)	7:23
5.	"Say Goodbye" (La Cream's Dub Mix)	6:12

== Charts ==
Chart (1999)	Peak position
Denmark (IFPI)	17
Finland (Suomen virallinen lista)	5
Norway (VG-lista)	9
Sweden (Sverigetopplistan)	21
