= Tess Mattisson =

Swedish singer (born 1978)

- Born: 13 February 1978 (age 48); Solna, Stockholm, Sweden
- Genres: Dance, pop
- Instrument: Vocals

Tess Mattisson (born 13 February 1978) is a Swedish singer and main character of eurodance group La Cream. Her mother is of Swedish/Belgian origin and her father of Finnish/Indian origin. She worked as a dancer and back-up singer for Rob'n'Raz, Dr. Alban, Basic Element and Drömhus. She has also studied French for three years.

== Discography ==
=== Album ===
- Sound & Vision (as La Cream, 1999)
- One Love to Justify (2001)

=== Singles ===
Year	Single	Peak chart positions	
Year	Single	SWE	NOR
1997	"Château d'Amour (as La Cream)		
1998	"You" (as La Cream)	12	3
1999	"Say Goodbye" (as La Cream)	21	9
1999	"Free" (as La Cream)	12	—
2000	"Justify My Love"	18	4
2000	"Viva L'Amor"	23	—
2000	"One Love"	58	—
2001	"Stay"	—	—
2004	"The Second You Sleep"	12	—
2005	"Breathless"	8	—
"—" denotes releases that did not chart

=== Video games ===
Tess has a total of 2 songs which appear in the Dance Dance Revolution arcade series. StepManiaX also features these songs, plus "Confusion".

Song	Arcade game			StepManiaX availability
Song	MAX	MAX2	SMX	StepManiaX availability
"Justify My Love"	Yes	Yes	Yes	June 17, 2020
"Stay"		Yes	Yes	July 24, 2020
"Confusion"			Yes	November 28, 2020
