= Mr. DJ (Dr. Alban song) =

1997 single by Dr. Alban

Single by Dr. Alban

from the album I Believe
- A-side: "Guess Who's Coming to Dinner"
- Released: 1997
- Studio: Dr. Records
- Genre: Eurodance
- Length: 3:38
- Label: CNR Music
- Songwriters: Dr. Alban; Peter Hartmann; Robin Rex
- Producer: Dr. Alban

Dr. Alban singles chronology
"Hallelujah Day" (1996)	"Mr. DJ" / "Guess Who's Coming to Dinner" (1997)	"Long Time Ago" (1998)

Music video
- "Mr. DJ" on YouTube

"Mr. DJ" is a song by Sweden-based musician and producer Dr. Alban, released as a double A-side with "Guess Who's Coming to Dinner" in 1997 by CNR Music. It was the lead single from his fifth studio album, I Believe (1997), and has been described as a typical Dr. Alban song, but updated to incorporate more progressive house and trance. Dr. Alban produced and co-wrote the song which features backing vocals by Monica Löfgren. It was successful especially in Spain, peaking at number three on the Spanish Singles Chart. Additionally, it peaked at number six in Sweden and number eight in Finland, and also charted in Austria, Germany and Romania. On the Eurochart Hot 100, the single peaked at number 79. German DJ/production team Sash! made remixes of the track.

== Track listings ==
12-inch single, France (1997)
No.	Title	Length
1.	"Mr. DJ" (Tokapi Extended Mix)	5:20
2.	"Mr. DJ" (Tokapi Sash Mix)	5:35
3.	"Mr. DJ" (R 'n' B Mix)	3:25

CD single, France (1997)
No.	Title	Length
1.	"Mr. DJ" (Tokapi Mix)	3:38
2.	"Mr. DJ" (R 'n' B Mix)	3:25
3.	"Mr. DJ" (Tokapi Sash! Mix)	5:35

CD maxi, Germany (1997)
No.	Title	Length
1.	"Mr. DJ" (Tokapi Mix)	3:38
2.	"Mr. DJ" (Tokapi Extended Mix)	5:20
3.	"Mr. DJ" (Ari's Original Mix)	3:38
4.	"Mr. DJ" (Twin Mix)	3:51
5.	"Mr. DJ" (R 'n' B Mix)	3:25
6.	"Mr. DJ" (Tokapi Sash! Mix)	5:35
7.	"Mr. DJ" (C & N Project Mix)	8:06

== Charts ==
=== Weekly charts ===
Chart (1997)	Peak position
Austria (Ö3 Austria Top 40)	21
Belgium (Ultratip Bubbling Under Flanders)	13
Europe (Eurochart Hot 100)	79
Finland (Suomen virallinen lista)	8
Germany (GfK)	70
Spain (AFYVE)	3
Sweden (Sverigetopplistan)	6

=== Year-end charts ===
Chart (1997)	Position
Romania (Romanian Top 100)	64
Sweden (Topplistan)	58
