= Hello Afrika =

Hello Afrika (The Album)

Studio album by Dr. Alban
- Released: 1990 (Sweden)
- Recorded: 1990
- Genre: Eurodance; reggae
- Label: SweMix Records
- Producer: Denniz Pop

Dr. Alban chronology
Hello Afrika (The Album) (1990)	One Love (1992)

Singles from Hello Afrika (The Album)
- 1. "Hello Afrika" Released: September 1990; 2. "No Coke" Released: November 1990; 3. "U & Mi" Released: 1991; 4. "(Sing Shi-Wo-Wo) Stop the Pollution" Released: 1991

Hello Afrika (The Album) is the debut studio album from Swedish-based Nigerian artist Dr. Alban, released in 1990. The album was produced by Denniz Pop and released through the label SweMix Records. The album was also released as a second edition in 1991, with a different track listing.

== Track listing ==
=== Original version ===
1. "The Alban Prelude" (1:33)
2. "U & Mi" (3:44)
3. "No Coke" (with Intro) (7:00)
4. "Sweet Reggae Music" (5:25)
5. "Hello Afrika" (5:44)
6. "China Man" (5:04)
7. "Groove Machine II" (2:08)
8. "Proud! (To Be Afrikan)" (4:16)
9. "Our Father (Pater Noster)" (4:40)
10. "Man & Woman" (5:09)
11. "No Coke (No Hasch-Hasch Mix)" (6:10)
12. "Hello Afrika (42 Street Mix)" (6:29)
13. "Thank You" (4:19)

=== 2nd edition ===
1. "The Alban Prelude" (1:35)
2. "U & Mi" (3:47)
3. "No Coke" (6:41)
4. "Sweet Reggae Music" (5:27)
5. "Hello Afrika" (5:45)
6. "(Sing Shi-Wo-Wo) Stop the Pollution" (3:42)
7. "Our Father (Pater Noster)" (4:44)
8. "Proud! (To Be Afrikan)"(4:17)
9. "Groove Machine 2" (2:10)
10. "U & Mi (Remix 91)" (5:02)
11. "No Coke (Float Remix)" (3:49)

== Charts ==
=== Weekly charts ===
Chart (1990–91)	Peak position
Austrian Albums (Ö3 Austria)	2
Dutch Albums (Album Top 100)	43
Finnish Albums (Suomen virallinen lista)	29
German Albums (Offizielle Top 100)	11
Greek Albums (IFPI)	2
Portuguese Albums (AFP)	7
Swedish Albums (Sverigetopplistan)	6
Swiss Albums (Schweizer Hitparade)	8

=== Year-end charts ===
Chart (1991)	Position
Austrian Albums (Ö3 Austria)	9
Dutch Albums (Album Top 100)	93
German Albums (Offizielle Top 100)	49

== Sales and certifications ==
Certifications for Hello Afrika
Region	Certification	Certified units/sales
Austria (IFPI Austria)	Platinum	50,000^{*}
Germany (BVMI)	Gold	250,000^{^}
Switzerland (IFPI Switzerland)	Gold	25,000^{^}
^{*} Sales figures based on certification alone.^{^} Shipments figures based on certification alone.
