= Look Who's Talking (song) =

1994 single by Dr. Alban

"Look Who's Talking!"

Single by Dr. Alban

from the album Look Who's Talking
- Released: February 1994
- Studio: Dr. Records
- Genre: Eurodance; Eurodisco; worldbeat
- Length: 3:13; 5:22
- Label: Cheiron
- Songwriters: Dr. Alban; Kofi Bentsi-Enshill; Ebenezer Thompson; Denniz PoP
- Producers: The Menace; Kristian Lundin

Dr. Alban singles chronology
"Sing Hallelujah" (1993)	"Look Who's Talking!" (1994)	"Away from Home" (1994)

Music video
- "Look Who's Talking!" on YouTube

Alternative cover
- CD maxi – Remix

"Look Who's Talking!" is a song by Sweden-based musician and producer Dr. Alban, featuring vocals from Swedish singer Nana Hedin. It was released in February 1994 by Cheiron Records as the first single from his third studio album, Look Who's Talking (1994). Co-written by Alban with Denniz PoP, the song tells about a pop star named Mr. X who says nasty things about everyone, therefore "Look Who's Talking!".

The song was co-produced by Kristian Lundin and reached number one in Denmark and Finland, as well as becoming a top-10 in almost several other European countries. It entered the Eurochart Hot 100 on 12 March 1994 at number 61 and went on to peak at the second position four weeks later. In the United States, it peaked at number 11 on the Billboard Dance Club Play chart. The accompanying music video was directed by Jonathan Bate and featured Alban performing at a movie set. It received heavy rotation on European music television channels. A CD maxi containing four remixes was also released, particularly devoted to the dance floors.

== Critical reception ==
AllMusic editor John Bush noted that Dr. Alban uses elements of worldbeat to "mix up" the song. Larry Flick from Billboard magazine stated that it follows the Euro-disco/world-beat thread" of 1993's "It's My Life", "sewing in several intriguing new creative colors." Pan-European magazine Music & Media wrote, "His instantly recognisable coffee brown rap sets the bush doctor apart from the rest in the Euro dance field with standard synth riffs and one-line choruses sung by anonymous ladies." Alan Jones from Music Week described it as a "simple and maddeningly familiar song [that] relies on a hooky refrain, while Alban adds his odd African-accented rap in a style reminiscent of his early 'No Coke' single."

Wendi Cermak from The Network Forty complimented it as "a must-purchase". A reviewer from Reading Evening Post described it as "an inane but insistent tune." James Hamilton from the Record Mirror Dance Update named it a "Afro-ish choppily chanted and girls chorused breezy Euro romper" in his weekly dance column. Pete Stanton from Smash Hits gave "Look Who's Talking!" two out of five, noting "its pacy Euro beats and singalong chorus". James Hunter from Vibe described it as "superefficient disco glued down with dancehall toasting, answered by streaming female vocals."

== Chart performance ==
"Look Who's Talking!" charted all over the world and peaked at number one in Denmark and Finland for two and four weeks, respectively. It became a top-five hit also in Austria, Belgium, Germany, the Netherlands, Norway, Spain and Sweden, as well as a top-10 hit in Switzerland. In Germany, the single peaked at number three for two weeks and spent a total of 20 weeks inside the German Singles Chart. In addition, the single entered the top 20 in France, Ireland and Italy and was a top-30 hit in Iceland.

In the UK, it reached number 55 on the UK Singles Chart on 20 March 1994, while on both the Music Week Dance Singles chart and UK Club Chart, it peaked at number 20 during the same period. On the Eurochart Hot 100, "Look Who's Talking!" peaked at number two for two weeks after five weeks on the chart. Outside Europe, the song charted in West Asia, becoming a top-five hit in Israel, peaking at number three on 15 March. In Africa, it peaked at number ten in Zimbabwe, and in the US, it reached numbers 11 and 50 on the Billboard Dance Club Play chart and the Billboard Maxi-Singles Sales charts.

== Airplay ==
"Look Who's Talking!" peaked at number 12 on the European Dance Radio Chart in April 1994. It also entered the European airplay chart Border Breakers by Music & Media at number nine on 12 March due to crossover airplay in West Central-, North West-, North- and South-Europe. The single peaked at number four on 26 March. Sweden, the Netherlands and Finland showed the highest penetration figures for "Look Who's Talking!" (67-75%) on the European Hit Radio chart, followed by Switzerland, Denmark, Belgium, Germany and the UK (25-50%).

== Music video ==
The accompanying music video for "Look Who's Talking!" was directed by Jonathan Bate. In the video, Dr. Alban performs the song at a movie set, surrounded by four ladies singing the choruses. For unknown reasons it doesn't feature Nana Hedin. There is a storyline of a man playing the pop star Mr. X from the song's lyrics. He appears on the set with his dogs, talks in a mobile phone, drinks and tries to get attention from the girls on the set. In the end everyone leaves the set and the pop star ends up alone on his own. The video also features Asian shadow theatre figures and has a sepia tone. It received heavy rotation on MTV Europe and was A-listed on German music television channel VIVA in April 1994. Three months later, it was A-listed on France's MCM. Bate would also direct the videos for Dr. Alban's next two singles, "Away from Home" and "Let the Beat Go On".

== Track listings ==
- 12-inch single
1. "Look Who's Talking (Long Version) – 5:22
2. "Look Who's Talking (Stone's Clubmix) – 7:14
3. "Look Who's Talking (Short Version) – 3:13
4. "Look Who's Talking (Stone's Eurodub) – 6:16
- CD single
1. "Look Who's Talking" (Short) – 3:13
2. "Look Who's Talking" (Long) – 5:22
- CD maxi
1. "Look Who's Talking" (Short) – 3:13
2. "Look Who's Talking" (Long) – 5:22
3. "Look Who's Talking" (Stone's Clubmix) – 7:14
4. "Look Who's Talking" (Stone's Eurodub) – 6:16
- CD maxi – Remix
1. "Look Who's Talking" (Lucky Version) – 5:50
2. "Look Who's Talking" (Lucky Edit) – 3:29
3. "Look Who's Talking" (Attitude Version) – 10:40
4. "Look Who's Talking" (Rascal Instrumental) – 6:52
- CD maxi – UK release
1. "Look Who's Talking" (Short) – 3:13
2. "Look Who's Talking" (Stone's Radio) – 4:14
3. "Look Who's Talking" (Long) – 5:22
4. "Look Who's Talking" (Stone's Club Mix) – 7:14
5. "It's My Life" (Album Version) – 4:00

== Charts ==
=== Weekly charts ===
Chart (1993–1996)	Peak position
Australia (ARIA)	215
Austria (Ö3 Austria Top 40)	3
Belgium (Ultratop 50 Flanders)	5
Belgium (VRT Top 30 Flanders)	4
Denmark (IFPI)	1
Europe (Eurochart Hot 100)	2
Europe (European Dance Radio)	12
Europe (European Hit Radio)	10
Finland (Suomen virallinen lista)	1
France (SNEP)	17
Germany (Media Control)	3
Iceland (Íslenski Listinn Topp 40)	23
Ireland (IRMA)	17
Israel (Israeli Singles Chart)	3
Italy (Musica e dischi)	11
Netherlands (Dutch Top 40)	4
Netherlands (Single Top 100)	4
Norway (VG-lista)	4
Scottish Singles Sales (Official Charts)	47
Spain (AFYVE)	2
Sweden (Sverigetopplistan)	2
Switzerland (Schweizer Hitparade)	6
UK Singles (Official Charts)	55
UK Dance (Music Week)	20
UK Club Chart (Music Week)	20
US Dance Club Play (Billboard)	11
US Maxi-Singles Sales (Billboard)	50
Zimbabwe (ZIMA)	10

=== Year-end charts ===
Chart (1994)	Position
Austria (Ö3 Austria Top 40)	17
Belgium (Ultratop 50 Flanders)	26
Europe (Eurochart Hot 100)	22
Germany (Media Control)	26
Netherlands (Dutch Top 40)	27
Netherlands (Single Top 100)	54
Sweden (Topplistan)	12
Switzerland (Schweizer Hitparade)	29

== Release history ==
Region	Date	Format(s)	Label(s)	Ref.
Europe	February 1994	—N/a	Cheiron	
United Kingdom	14 March 1994	7-inch vinyl; 12-inch vinyl; CD; cassette	Logic	
