= Andrea Myrander =

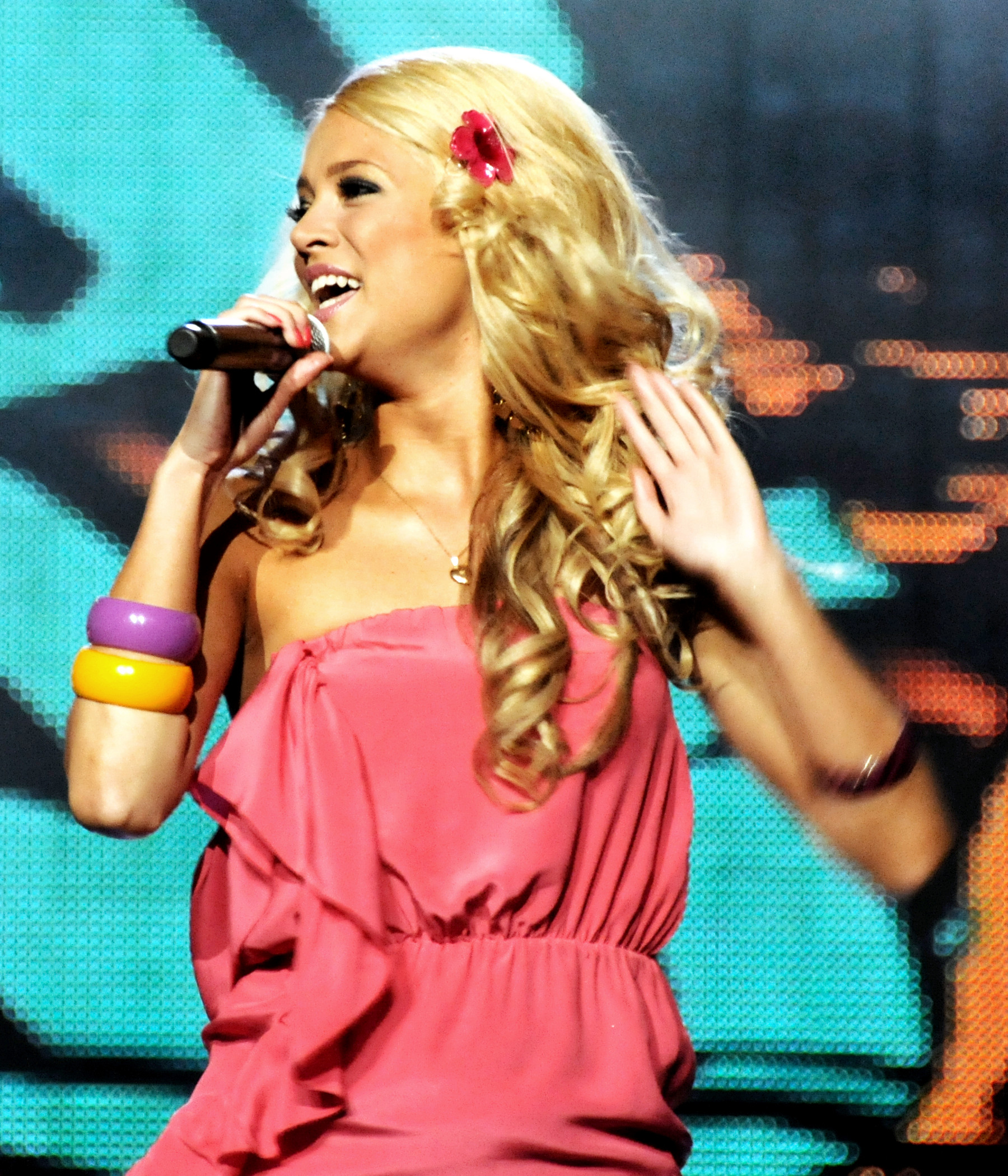
- Andrea Myrander performing during a Basic Element concert

Background information
- Born: July 6, 1985 (age 41); Haninge
- Origin: Sweden
- Genres: Eurodance, Dance, Dance-pop
- Occupations: Singer, beauty pageant, photo model, fitness instructor
- Instrument: Vocals
- Years active: 2007–present

Andrea Myrander (born 1985) is a Swedish pop singer and former beauty pageant contestant. She was the lead singer of the Eurodance-hip hop group Basic Element from 2007 to early 2011. Myrander has done photoshoots for the men's publication, Moore Magazine. Myrander has also released a single under the stage name Bliz.

== Pageants ==
Myrander won Miss Polonia of Sweden 2007, a beauty pageant, and went on to compete in Miss Polonia, placing in the top ten. She was crowned Miss Haninge 2008 and participated in the Swedish national final for Miss World 2008 but did not win. She competed in Miss Universe Sweden 2010 and placed third to winner Michaela Savic.
