= Look Who's Talking (album) =

Look Who's Talking! (The Album)

Studio album by Dr. Alban
- Released: 25 March 1994
- Recorded: 1994
- Label: BMG; Ariola; Rec.Service; Sony
- Producer: Denniz Pop; Kristian Lundin; John Amatiello; Ira Ward; Kojo Thompson

Dr. Alban chronology
One Love (1992)	Look Who's Talking! (The Album) (1994)	Born in Africa (1996)

Singles from Look Who's Talking! (The Album)
- 1. "Look Who's Talking!" Released: February 1994; 2. "Away from Home" Released: May 1994; 3. "Let the Beat Go On" Released: August 1994

Professional ratings
Review scores
Source	Rating
Music Week	2/5 stars
Select	1/5 medals

Look Who's Talking, stylized as Look Whos Talking! – The Album, is the third studio album by Swedish-Nigerian singer Dr. Alban. It was released in 1994 through BMG, Ariola, and Rec.Service. The album won an award in the category for Best Swedish Dance Album 1994 at the 1995 Swedish Dance Music Awards.

== Track listing ==
1. "Hard Pan Di Drums" (6:22)
2. "Look Who's Talking!" (3:13)
3. "Free Up Soweto" (3:24)
4. "Away from Home" (3:45)
5. "Gimme Dat Lovin" (4:06)
6. "Let the Beat Go On" (3:56)
7. "Fire" (3:41)
8. "Home Sweet Home" (3:11)
9. "Go See the Dentist" (4:27)
10. "Sweet Little Girl" (3:05)
11. "Plastic Smile" (3:42)
12. "Awillawillawillahey" (4:10)
13. "Look Who's Talking! (Stone's Radio)" (4:07)

== Charts ==
=== Weekly charts ===
Chart (1994)	Peak position
Austrian Albums (Ö3 Austria)	7
Dutch Albums (Album Top 100)	28
Finnish Albums (Suomen virallinen lista)	4
German Albums (Offizielle Top 100)	7
Hungarian Albums (MAHASZ)	2
Norwegian Albums (VG-lista)	13
Swedish Albums (Sverigetopplistan)	11
Swiss Albums (Schweizer Hitparade)	8

=== Year-end charts ===
Chart (1994)	Position
Austrian Albums (Ö3 Austria)	40
German Albums (Offizielle Top 100)	43

== Sales and certifications ==
Certifications for Look Who's Talking
Region	Certification	Certified units/sales
Austria (IFPI Austria)	Gold	25,000^{*}
Finland (Musiikkituottajat)	Gold	23,731
Sweden (GLF)	Gold	50,000^{^}
^{*} Sales figures based on certification alone.^{^} Shipments figures based on certification alone.
