= One Love (Dr. Alban album) =

One Love (The Album)

Studio album by Dr. Alban
- Released: 23 November 1992
- Recorded: 1992
- Label: BMG; Ariola; Sony
- Producer: Denniz PoP; Douglas Carr

Dr. Alban chronology
Hello Afrika (1990)	One Love (The Album) (1992)	Look Who's Talking (1994)

Singles from One Love (The Album)
- 1. "It's My Life" Released: February 1992; 2. "One Love" Released: August 1992; 3. "Sing Hallelujah" Released: February 1993

One Love (The Album) is the second studio album by European-based Nigerian artist Dr. Alban. It was released in 1992 through BMG and Ariola. The album was also released as a second edition in 1993, with a different track listing.

== Track listing ==
=== First edition ===
1. "Introduction" (1:45)
2. "It's My Life" (4:00)
3. "Sing Hallelujah" (4:24)
4. "Groove Machine 4" (3:41)
5. "Reggae Gone Ragga" (4:01)
6. "Cash Money" (3:36)
7. "One Love" (5:27)
8. "Om we rembwe ike" (4:47)
9. "Groove Machine 5" (4:46)
10. "Mata oh a eh" (4:20)
11. "Roll Down Di Rubber Man" (5:39)
12. "It's My Life (Club Edit)" (4:00)

=== Second edition ===
1. "Introduction" (1:45)
2. "It's My Life" (4:00)
3. "One Love" (4:00)
4. "Sing Hallelujah" (4:00)
5. "Mata oh a eh" (4:20)
6. "Reggae Gone Ragga" (4:01)
7. "Om we rembwe ike" (4:47)
8. "Hard To Choose" (3:53)
9. "Cash Money" (3:36)
10. "Roll Down Di Rubber Man" (5:39)
11. "It's My Life (Remix)" (4:32)
12. "One Love (Remix)" (4:30)

== Charts ==
Chart (1992)	Peak Position
Austrian Albums (Ö3 Austria)	1
Dutch Albums (Album Top 100)	20
Finnish Albums (Suomen virallinen lista)	4
German Albums (Offizielle Top 100)	6
Hungarian Albums (MAHASZ)	4
Norwegian Albums (VG-lista)	15
Swedish Albums (Sverigetopplistan)	15
Swiss Albums (Schweizer Hitparade)	3

== Sales and certifications ==
Certifications for One Love
Region	Certification	Certified units/sales
Austria (IFPI Austria)	Platinum	50,000^{*}
Germany (BVMI)	Gold	250,000^{^}
Finland (Musiikkituottajat)	Gold	31,794
Switzerland (IFPI Switzerland)	Platinum	50,000^{^}
^{*} Sales figures based on certification alone.^{^} Shipments figures based on certification alone.
