= Away from Home =

Single by Dr. Alban

from the album Look Who's Talking
- Released: May 1994
- Recorded: 1994
- Studio: Cheiron
- Genre: Eurodance
- Length: 3:18; 5:18 (extended)
- Label: Cheiron
- Songwriters: Dr Alban; Kristian Lundin; John Amatiello
- Producer: Denniz PoP

Dr. Alban singles chronology
"Look Who's Talking" (1994)	"Away from Home" (1994)	"Let the Beat Go On" (1994)

Music video
- "Away from Home" on YouTube

"Away from Home" is a song recorded by Sweden-based musician and producer Dr Alban, released in May 1994 by Cheiron as the second single from Alban's third studio album, Look Who's Talking (1994). The song was written by Alban with Kristian Lundin and John Amatiello, and produced by Denniz PoP. In comparison with the previous Dr Alban's singles, the song met a smaller success. But it made it to number two in Finland, number five in Spain, number 12 in Austria, number 13 in Denmark and number 17 in Switzerland. In the UK, "Away from Home" peaked at number 42, while on the Eurochart Hot 100, it reached number 25 on 20 August 1994.

== Critical reception ==
Tony Cross from Smash Hits gave "Away from Home" three out of five, complimenting it as "pure pop reggae".

== Airplay ==
"Away from Home" entered the European airplay chart Border Breakers at number 21 on 25 June 1994 due to crossover airplay in West Central-, East Central-, North- and South-Europe, and peaked at number five on 23 July.

== Music video ==
The accompanying music video for "Away from Home" was directed by Jonathan Bate. It received "prime break out" rotation on MTV Europe in July 1994. One month later, it was B-listed on German music television channel VIVA. Bate had previously directed the video for "Look Who's Talking".

== Track listings ==
- CD single
1. "Away from Home" (short) — 3:18
2. "Away from Home" (long) — 5:18
- CD maxi
1. "Away from Home" (short) — 3:18
2. "Away from Home" (long) — 5:18
3. "Away from Home" (amaway mix) — 6:10
4. "Away from Home" (IMashed up version) — 4:48

== Charts ==
Chart (1994–95)	Peak position
Australia (ARIA)	92
Austria (Ö3 Austria Top 40)	12
Belgium (Ultratop 50 Flanders)	27
Belgium (VRT Top 30 Flanders)	17
Denmark (IFPI)	13
Europe (Eurochart Hot 100)	25
Europe (European AC Radio)	25
Europe (European Dance Radio)	8
Europe (European Hit Radio)	32
Finland (Suomen virallinen lista)	2
Germany (GfK)	25
Netherlands (Dutch Top 40 Tipparade)	2
Netherlands (Single Top 100)	45
Scotland (OCC)	53
Spain (AFYVE)	5
Sweden (Sverigetopplistan)	24
Switzerland (Schweizer Hitparade)	17
UK Singles (OCC)	42
UK Dance (OCC)	29
UK Club Chart (Music Week)	20
US Dance Club Play (Billboard)	5
US Maxi-Singles Sales (Billboard)	38
