= The Promise Man =

Single by Basic Element

from the album Basic Injection
- Released: 1993
- Genre: Eurodance
- Length: 3:55
- Label: EMI Inhouse
- Songwriters: Cesar Zamini; Peter Thelenius
- Producer: Stefan Andersson

Basic Element singles chronology
"Move Me" (1993)	"The Promise Man" (1993)	"Touch" (1994)

Music video
- "The Promise Man" on YouTube

"The Promise Man" is a song by Swedish Eurodance band Basic Element featuring vocalist Zetma Prembo, released in 1993 by EMI Records as the second single from their first album, Basic Injection (1994). It is written by Cesar Zamini and Peter Thelenius, and produced by Stefan Andersson, and is one of their most successful songs. It was a big hit in Scandinavia, peaking at number three in Sweden and number six in both Denmark and Finland. In Sweden, it stayed within the chart for 16 weeks, topped the Swedish dance chart for five weeks and topped the Swedish national radio P3 Tracks chart as one of the most played songs on radio. On the Eurochart Hot 100, "The Promise Man" reached number 33 in April 1994. The album included two different versions of the song, including the Rob & JJ Euroclub Mix.

== Track listings ==
- CD single, Sweden (1993)
1. "The Promise Man" — 3:55
2. "The Promise Man" (Extended Club Version) — 7:12
- CD maxi, Europe (1993)
1. "The Promise Man" — 3:55
2. "The Promise Man" (Extended Club Mix) — 7:12
3. "The Promise Man" (Instrumental Version) — 3:55
4. "Move Me" (Old School Version) — 3:45
- CD-maxi (remixes), Europe (1993)
1. "The Promise Man" (Rob & JJ Euroclub Mix) (Radio Edit) — 4:18
2. "The Promise Man" (Rob & JJ Euroclub Mix) (Extended Club Mix) — 5:15
3. "The Promise Man" (Rob & JJ Euroclub Mix) (Instrumental) — 5:15
4. "The Promise Man" (Rob & JJ LFO Mix) — 5:15
5. "The Promise Man" (Rob & JJ LFO Dub) — 5:55

== Charts ==
=== Weekly charts ===
Chart (1993–1994)	Peak position
Denmark (IFPI)	6
Europe (Eurochart Hot 100)	33
Finland (Suomen virallinen lista)	6
Sweden (Sverigetopplistan)	3
Sweden Airplay (Radio P3 Tracks Chart)	1
Sweden Dance (Swedish Dance Chart)	1

=== Year-end charts ===
Chart (1994)	Position
Sweden (Topplistan)	17
