= One Love (Dr. Alban song) =

Single by Dr. Alban

from the album One Love
- B-side: "Reggae Gone Ragga"
- Released: August 1992
- Recorded: 1992
- Genre: Dancehall; reggae fusion; swingbeat
- Length: 4:12 (radio version); 6:03 (extended version)
- Label: SweMix
- Songwriters: Dr Alban; Denniz PoP
- Producer: Denniz PoP

Dr. Alban singles chronology
| "It's My Life" (1992) | "One Love" (1992) | "Sing Hallelujah" (1993) |

Music video
- "One Love" on YouTube

"One Love" is a song recorded by the Sweden based musician and producer Dr Alban. It was released in August 1992 by SweMix as the second single from his second studio album, One Love (1992). Alban co-wrote it with Denniz PoP, who also produced, and it features backing vocals by Swedish music group DaYeene. The song was a hit in many European countries, making it to the top-10 in Austria, Belgium, Finland, Germany, Ireland (number three) and Norway. However, the song was not as successful as "It's My Life", the previous single. On the Eurochart Hot 100, "One Love" peaked at number 23. Outside Europe, it was successful in Israel, reaching number four. The accompanying music video was directed by Swedish director Fredrik Boklund.

== Critical reception ==
Larry Flick from Billboard magazine described the song as "a clever, harmonious call for unity over a string-laden ragga/swing groove that demands urban radio play and a sleaze-speed club remix." Pan-European magazine Music & Media wrote, "Another hit out of the doctor's private practice is on its way. The "Africana" version will make alternative programmers blush admitting that a popular artist can be innovating as well, but not for Dutch alternative public outlet, VPRO's DJ Lux Janssen "I play the song, although it might not be 'comme it faut' in our [left of center] surroundings. For me, however, Dr. Alban has the right amount of slickness."

== Track listings ==
- 7" single
1. "One Love" (radio version) — 4:12
2. "Reggae Gone Ragga" (album version) — 4:01
- CD single
1. "One Love" (radio version) — 4:12
2. "Reggae Gone Ragga" (album version) — 4:01
- CD maxi
1. "One Love" (radio version) — 4:12
2. "One Love" (extended version) — 6:03
3. "One Love" (dragon fly version) — 5:17
4. "One Love" (africana version) — 4:55

== Charts ==
=== Weekly charts ===
| Chart (1992) | Peak position |
|---|---|
| Australia (ARIA) | 193 |
| Austria (Ö3 Austria Top 40) | 9 |
| Belgium (Ultratop 50 Flanders) | 8 |
| Europe (Eurochart Hot 100) | 23 |
| Finland (Suomen virallinen lista) | 7 |
| Germany (GfK) | 7 |
| Hungary (Rádiós Top 40) | 36 |
| Hungary (Single Top 40) | 17 |
| Ireland (IRMA) | 3 |
| Israel (Israeli Singles Chart) | 4 |
| Netherlands (Dutch Top 40) | 12 |
| Netherlands (Single Top 100) | 14 |
| New Zealand (Recorded Music NZ) | 42 |
| Norway (VG-lista) | 10 |
| Sweden (Sverigetopplistan) | 19 |
| Switzerland (Schweizer Hitparade) | 19 |
| UK Singles (OCC) | 45 |
| UK Airplay (Music Week) | 48 |
| UK Dance (Music Week) | 34 |
| UK Club Chart (Music Week) | 73 |

=== Year-end charts ===
| Chart (1992) | Position |
|---|---|
| Belgium (Ultratop) | 89 |
| Germany (Media Control) | 42 |
| Israel (Israeli Singles Chart) | 37 |
| Sweden (Topplistan) | 88 |
