= I Believe (Dr. Alban album) =

Studio album by Dr. Alban
- Released: 1 October 1997
- Recorded: 1997
- Genre: Electronica, eurodance, house
- Label: Metrovynil (EAMS Lesser) / Fever / SDS

Dr. Alban chronology
Born in Africa (1996)	I Believe (1997)	Prescription (2001)

Singles from I Believe
- 1. ""Guess Who's Coming to Dinner (Carolina)"" Released: 1997; 2. "Mr. DJ" Released: 1997; 3. "Long Time Ago" Released: 1997; 4. "Feel the Rhythm" Released: 1998

I Believe is the fifth studio album of European-based Nigerian artist Dr. Alban. It was released on 1 October 1997.

== Track listing ==
1. Intro (3:43)
2. "Guess Who's Coming to Dinner" (feat. Michael Rose) (3:44)
3. "Mr. DJ" (3:37)
4. "Soon Come" (3:33)
5. "Feel the Rhythm" (4:18)
6. "Enemies" (3:33)
7. "Long Time Ago" (3:27)
8. "I Believe" (3:47)
9. "Oh Baby" (3:13)
10. "Show Me" (3:36)
11. "Mountains" (3:18)
12. "Humpty Dumpty" (2:32)
13. "Love Affair" (2:52)
14. "Honey Bunny" (3:18)
15. "Ain't No Stopping" (3:11)
16. "Raggamuffin Girl" (3:33)
17. "Oh Baby" (Sly & Robbie Mix) (3:12)

== Charts ==
Chart (1997)	Peak Position
Austrian Albums (Ö3 Austria)	41
Finnish Albums (Suomen virallinen lista)	30
Swedish Albums (Sverigetopplistan)	27
