= It's My Life (Dr. Alban song) =

1992 single by Dr. Alban

Single by Dr. Alban

from the album One Love
- Released: February 1992
- Genre: Europop; house
- Length: 4:00
- Label: SweMix
- Composer: Denniz PoP
- Lyricist: Dr. Alban
- Producer: Denniz PoP

Dr. Alban singles chronology
"(Sing Shi-Wo-Wo) Stop the Pollution" (1991)	"It's My Life" (1992)	"One Love" (1992)

Music video
- "It's My Life" on YouTube

"It's My Life" is a song by Nigerian-Swedish recording artist Dr. Alban. It was released by label SweMix in February 1992 in Sweden as the first single from his second studio album, One Love (1992). Produced by Denniz PoP, who also co-wrote the song with Alban, it was a hit in Europe, peaking at number one in six countries and reaching number two in Ireland and the United Kingdom. The song was re-marketed in 1993 due to its usage in a TV advert for Tampax tampons. The song additionally charted in the United States and was re-released in Australia in 1994, following the success of "Sing Hallelujah!".

== Background ==
Dr. Alban has stated that the song took five hours to record. In the 2017 book Stars of 90's Dance Pop: 29 Hitmakers Discuss Their Careers by James Arena, he explained on the new sound of the song: "'It's My Life' and another hit off the second album, 'Sing Hallelujah!', had totally different sounds [compared to his 1990 debut single "Hello Afrika", which I wanted to explore at the time. I left the 'Hello Afrika' sound and did 'It's My Life', which had more of a pop, catchy style. Keeping things fresh was very natural for us."

== Chart performance ==
"It's My Life" made a huge impact on the charts in Europe, becoming one of Dr. Alban's most successful songs to date. It peaked at number-one in Austria (6 weeks), Belgian Flanders (8 weeks), Germany (8 weeks), Italy, the Netherlands (5 weeks) and Sweden (2 weeks), as well as on the Eurochart Hot 100, where it peaked in October 1992. In addition, the single entered the top 10 in Denmark (3), Finland (5), Greece (2), Ireland (2), Norway (6), Portugal (9), Switzerland (2) and the United Kingdom. In the latter, it peaked at number two on 20 September 1992, in its fourth week on the UK Singles Chart. It was held off reaching the top spot by The Shamen's "Ebeneezer Goode".

Outside Europe, "It's My Life" reached number two on the Canadian RPM Dance/Urban chart, number three on the US Billboard Hot Dance Club Play chart and number ten in Zimbabwe in Africa. In West Asia, it became a top-10 hit also in Israel, peaking at number eight on 16 June 1992. The song spent seven weeks inside the Israeli top 30. In Australia and New Zealand, it was a top-50 hit, peaking at numbers 43 and 49, respectively.

The song was awarded with a silver record in France, after 125,000 units were sold, and a platinum record in Austria and Germany, with a sale of 30,000 and 500,000 singles.

== Critical reception ==
Larry Flick from Billboard magazine called "It's My Life" "a fast'n'furious cut". He explained that the European rapper/toaster has previously been heralded for his sturdy dancehall releases. "This time, however, he aims for mainstream approval with a gem of a jam that carefully skirts the line dividing hi-NRG and rave sectors. Anthemic chants are placed within a percolating vat of keyboard and percussion effects that will kick during peak-hour sets." Linda Ryan from the Gavin Report viewed it as a "mad creation". Melody Maker declared it as a "veiled gay-anthem" which "made an ace Tampax ad." Alan Jones from Music Week commented, "A highly commercial house track, recorded in Sweden, it's basically a West Indian accented rap punctuated at regular intervals by a catchy chorus. Probable Top 10 hit."

R.S. Murthi from New Straits Times described the song as "a righteous declaration of independence" and added that it shows "a genuine attempt at depth." NME ranked "It's My Life" number five in their list of "Top Five Euro-Hits of All Time" in December 1993, writing, ""Stop bugging me!" Dr. Alban's finest moment, as he decides that his life, after all is his own, and asks whether the world's producers can kindly leave him alone. The ultimate plea for Europop autonomy. And a half." Mark Frith from Smash Hits complimented it as "a half-decent Euro-pop tune" that "will be remembered as an essential part of the music of summer '92."

== Track listings ==
- 7-inch and CD single
1. "It's My Life" (radio edit) – 4:00
2. "It's My Life" (club edit) – 4:10
- 12-inch single
1. "It's My Life" (extended club mix) – 7:45
2. "It's My Life" (extended radio edit) – 7:05
3. "It's My Life" (radio edit) – 4:00
- CD maxi
1. "It's My Life" (radio edit) – 4:00
2. "It's My Life" (extended radio edit) – 7:05
3. "It's My Life" (extended club mix) – 7:45

== Personnel ==
Writers

- Denniz PoP – composer
- Dr. Alban – lyricist

Vocals

- Dr. Alban – lead vocals, rap
- Paola Toro – background vocals

Choir

- Gladys del Pilar – additional vocals
- Marie Bergman – additional vocals
- Rico – additional vocals
- Bjorn Strom – additional vocals
- Anneli Berg – additional vocals

Technical

- Denniz PoP – producer
- Douglas Carr – remix, co-producer
- Anders Hansson – arranger
- Gundars Rullis – engineer
- Björn Engelmann – mastering
- Rene "JM Fax" Hedemyr – executive producer

== Charts ==
=== Weekly charts ===
1992–1993 weekly chart performance for "It's My Life"
Chart (1992–1993)	Peak position
Australia (ARIA)	97
Austria (Ö3 Austria Top 40)	1
Belgium (Ultratop 50 Flanders)	1
Canada Dance/Urban (RPM)	2
Denmark (IFPI)	3
Europe (Eurochart Hot 100)	1
Europe (European Dance Radio)	7
Finland (Suomen virallinen lista)	5
France (SNEP)	13
Germany (GfK)	1
Greece (Virgin)	2
Ireland (IRMA)	2
Israel (Israeli Singles Chart)	8
Italy (Musica e dischi)	1
Netherlands (Dutch Top 40)	1
Netherlands (Single Top 100)	1
New Zealand (Recorded Music NZ)	49
Norway (VG-lista)	6
Portugal (AFP)	9
Spain (AFYVE)	11
Sweden (Sverigetopplistan)	1
Switzerland (Schweizer Hitparade)	2
UK Singles (Official Charts)	2
UK Airplay (Music Week)	4
UK Dance (Music Week)	9
UK Club Chart (Music Week)	76
US Billboard Hot 100	88
US Dance Club Play (Billboard)	3
US Maxi-Singles Sales (Billboard)	4
US Modern Rock Tracks (Billboard)	28
Zimbabwe (ZIMA)	10

1994 weekly chart performance for "It's My Life"
Chart (1994)	Peak position
Australia (ARIA)	43

1997 weekly chart performance for "It's My Life '97"
Chart (1997)	Peak position
Finland (Suomen virallinen lista)	18

2019 weekly chart performance for "It's My Life"
Chart (2019)	Peak position
Finland Airplay (Radiosoittolista)	66

2021 weekly chart performance for "It's My Life"
Chart (2021)	Peak position
Hungary (Single Top 40)	33

2024 weekly chart performance for "It's My Life"
Chart (2024)	Peak position
Kazakhstan Airplay (TopHit)	38
Poland (Polish Airplay Top 100)	48

=== Monthly charts ===
Monthly chart performance for "It's My Life"
Chart (2024)	Peak position
Kazakhstan Airplay (TopHit)	72

=== Year-end charts ===
Year-end chart performance for "It's My Life"
Chart (1992)	Position
Austria (Ö3 Austria Top 40)	1
Belgium (Ultratop 50 Flanders)	3
Europe (Eurochart Hot 100)	3
Europe (European Dance Radio)	21
Germany (Media Control)	2
Israel (Israeli Singles Chart)	13
Netherlands (Dutch Top 40)	2
Netherlands (Single Top 100)	2
Sweden (Topplistan)	8
Switzerland (Schweizer Hitparade)	1
UK Singles (OCC)	18
UK Airplay (Music Week)	39

1993 year-end chart performance for "It's My Life"
Chart (1993)	Position
Canada Dance/Urban (RPM)	24

=== Decade-end charts ===
Decade-end chart performance for "It's My Life"
Chart (1990–1999)	Position
Austria (Ö3 Austria Top 40)	21
Belgium (Ultratop 50 Flanders)	26
Netherlands (Dutch Top 40)	41

== Certifications and sales ==
Certifications for "It's My Life"
Region	Certification	Certified units/sales
Austria (IFPI Austria)	Gold	25,000^{*}
France (SNEP)	Silver	125,000^{*}
Germany (BVMI)	Platinum	500,000^{^}
Netherlands (NVPI)	Platinum	75,000^{^}
United Kingdom (BPI)	Silver	200,000^{‡}
^{*} Sales figures based on certification alone.^{^} Shipments figures based on certification alone.^{‡} Sales+streaming figures based on certification alone.

== Release history ==
Release dates and formats for "It's My Life"
Region	Date	Format(s)	Label(s)	Ref.
Sweden	February 1992	7-inch vinyl; 12-inch vinyl; CD	SweMix	
Germany	1 May 1992	7-inch vinyl; CD	Logic; Ariola	
United Kingdom	24 August 1992	7-inch vinyl; 12-inch vinyl; CD; cassette	Arista; Logic	
Australia	19 October 1992	12-inch vinyl; CD; cassette	BMG Ariola; Logic	
Australia (re-release)	18 April 1994	CD; cassette	BMG Ariola; Logic	

== "It's My Life (Don't Worry)" ==
"It's My Life (Don't Worry)"

Single by Chawki featuring Dr. Alban
- Released: 13 November 2014
- Recorded: 2014
- Length: 3:29
- Label: RedOne
- Songwriters: Dr Alban; Denniz PoP; Travon Potts; RedOne; Rush
- Producer: RedOne

Chawki singles chronology
"Time of Our Lives" (2014)	"It's My Life (Don't Worry)" (2014)

Dr. Alban singles chronology
"Colour the World" (1999)	"It's My Life (Don't Worry)" (2014)

Music video
- "It's My Life (Don't Worry)" on YouTube

In 2014, a remake of the song was released by Moroccan singer Chawki featuring vocals by Dr. Alban. The song with amended lyrics also known as "It's My Life (Don't Worry)" was produced by RedOne and released on RedOne Records. A music video was also shot for the release. The single charted in the French SNEP official Singles Chart.

Chawki also released a bilingual English/French version of the song titled "It's My Life (C'est Ma Vie)".

=== Charts ===
Weekly chart performance for "It's My Life (Don't Worry)"
Chart (2015)	Peak position
France (SNEP)	187
