= Kilford =

English painter

Killy Kilford (born 1975 in England) is a British painter and installation artist based in New York City, US. Known for painting live on stage with musicians during their performances and the public installation of "Happy Street Signs".

== Live music mainting ==
Kilford's paintings are physical representations of music based on the colours he sees when he hears music. Kilford's live music paintings are created live alongside musicians during their performances. The creation of the painting starts at the first note of the performance and ends on the last note.

Kilford was the first painter to paint live on stage at Knebworth, he has painted live alongside a wide range of musicians including Baaba Maal, Iggy Pop, Paul Weller, I Blame Coco, Buena Vista Social Club, Robert Plant, Damon Albarn, The Black Eyed Peas, Brian Eno, Edward Sharpe and the Magnetic Zeros, The Magic Numbers, Saint Etienne, Cerys Matthews, Deep Purple, Status Quo and The Charlatans, Ras Kwame, I Blame Coco, Akala, Alice Russell, Pendulum, Skunk Anansie, Feeder, The Woodentops, Ernest Ranglin, The Vaccines, Jonathan Batiste and the Wu-Tang Clan.

Kilford curated a monthly live music painting installation called “One Love” where people could experience great live music being painted up close and live. The first One Love installation “One Love #1” took place 15 February 2010 and continued every 3rd Monday of the month at The Social in London for 13 months. Bands that played at One Love to date include Siskin, John & Jehn, The Woodentops, Dan Clews, Akala, Scarlette Fever, King Charles, Alexander Wolfe and Charlene Soraia.

== Happy Street Signs ==
Kilford moved to New York City in 2013 and was inspired by the street signs. Kilford began creating large paintings of street signs but modified them to project positive messages, the paintings were then used to design and manufacture Happy Street Signs to government specification.

On Tuesday 12 November 2013 Kilford curated an installation of 200 Happy Street Signs in Lower Manhattan and Williamsburg. 60 volunteers were involved with the installation which included surveying pedestrians in order to document the reaction from the public. Kilford believes that positive reinforcement via Happy Street Signs enables enhanced government communication which will contribute to a subtle, measurable increase in happiness. "If you see sign that says something different or unexpected, for example ‘honk less, love more,’ that will trigger a reaction, ideally a smile. If we can make people smile, then holistically, over time, that will start to increase...their level of happiness.”

Each Happy Street Sign displays "Dept of Well Being" at the bottom which is a fictitious government department. Kilford says " the City (New York City) needs a department designed to make us happier" and the results of the survey will provide statistics to prove it. Kilford has previously worked with the Office for National Statistics (British Government) who, amongst other duties, are responsible for the Measuring National Well Being Programme, a programme that measures well being in the United Kingdom.

== Early work ==
Although Kilford's early work was created within the context of music, it had a strong focus on fusing fashion and art. For Kilford's first public installation he installed a catwalk in the Burj Al Arab Hotel in Dubai and showed 30 paintings using models to carry each painting down the catwalk.

Following this, Kilford's donated painting sold at Elton John's White Tie and Tiara Ball in Cape Town. It was at this point that EJAF inspired the collaboration between Kilford and South African fashion designer Gavin Rajah. The pair worked on a number of projects, the most significant being the creation of an annual South African charitable event called Positive. Positive was conceptualized by Kilford and Rajah with a view to bringing art, music and fashion together as one to help combat AIDS. Sponsored by Sun International Hotels the event helps fund The Tapologo Aids Hospice which was founded by Bishop Kevin Dowling of the Catholic Diocese of Rustenburg.

The first Positive event took place 8 to 11 June 2006 at Sun City and incorporated fashion shows by Versace, Roberto Cavalli, Valentino as well as a headlining performance from SEAL. Kilford curated two exhibitions, during the event, the main exhibition called “Hope Healing and Compassion” including over 110 South African artists. The second exhibition was the ‘Wall of Hope’, this included a number of small paintings created by a wide range of leading bands, celebrities and children from the Tapologo AIDS Hospice on the subject of “Hope”.

Kilford is no longer involved with Positive.
