= Hello Afrika (song) =

1990 single by Dr. Alban featuring Leila K

Single by Dr. Alban featuring Leila K

from the album Hello Afrika
- Released: September 1990
- Recorded: 1990
- Genre: Dancehall; pop-rap; ragga; house
- Length: 3:13 (single mix); 5:44 (album version)
- Songwriters: Leila K; Dr. Alban; Denniz PoP
- Producer: Denniz PoP

Dr. Alban featuring Leila K singles chronology
"Hello Afrika" (1990)	"No Coke" (1990)

Music video
- "Hello Afrika" on YouTube

"Hello Afrika" is a song recorded by Sweden-based musician and producer Dr. Alban. It was released in September 1990 as the debut single from his first album with the same name (1990). It features Swedish Eurodance singer Leila K. The song is similar to Eddy Grant's "Hello Africa", but in the style of hip hop. It peaked at number one in Austria and achieved a great success in most of the other European countries, including Sweden, Germany and Switzerland. The accompanying music video was directed by Paul Boyd.

Dr. Alban has stated that "Hello Afrika" took about two months to record. In the 2017 book Stars of 90's Dance Pop: 29 Hitmakers Discuss Their Careers by James Arena, he told about meeting Denniz PoP and of the making of the song, "We met through the DJ channels, as he was working as one at the same time I was. We just started working together on "Hello Afrika", and it all came together. We had a good chemistry, and we just thought, "Come on, let's go in the studio and see what we can do." It was hard to get the song initially released, but the thing is that other DJs (who we gave it to before we had a record deal) played the track and liked it. That built demand for it in the clubs, and then it started to hit radio. That later paved the way for our deal with [Logic and Ariola Records]."

It has been covered by South African group Dr Victor and the Rasta Rebels. It was covered by Grup Raptiye as "Hello Malatya" at the 1991 album, Doping, and by Grup Vitamin as "Hamiyet" at "Bol Vitamin" one in 1990 and "Deli Dolu Best Of 1" in 1996.

== Critical reception ==
In his review of the Hello Afrika album, Larry Flick from Billboard magazine commented, "Equally strong are the title track, a prideful tribal ode that features a nifty guest appearance by Leila K." A reviewer from Music & Media wrote, "Pounding, tribal drums dominate this poppy rap for African unity." The magazine also named it "an great African house track, hailing from Sweden." They added, "This mixture of African tribal rhythms, Jamaican toasting and western house technology is already very big in Scandinavian and German clubs. The rest of Europe will doubtlessly follow." British magazine Music Week described it as a "Prince Buster influenced tuggingly rolling ragga rap".

== Music video ==
The music video for "Hello Afrika" was directed by Scottish director Paul Boyd. It received heavy rotation on MTV Europe in February 1991. Boyd would also go on directing the video for Alban's next single, "No Coke".

== Track listings ==
- 7" single
1. "Hello Afrika" (Marc Spoon's radio edit) — 3:46
2. "Hello Afrika" (single mix) — 3:13
- CD single
1. "Hello Afrika" (Marc Spoon's radio edit) — 3:46
2. "Hello Afrika" (single mix) — 3:13
- CD maxi
1. "Hello Afrika" (fast blast club mix) — 5:40
2. "Hello Afrika" (aaahfrika mix) — 6:25
3. "Jungle Beats" (gurana mix) — 4:28
4. "Hello Afrika" (single mix) — 3:13
- CD maxi/12" maxi single - Remix
1. "Hello Afrika" (tech-makossa-mix) — 7:42
2. "Hello Afrika" (freedom for bleeb & bass mix) — 6:30
3. "No Coke" (hip hop reggae in a dance hall style) — 4:40

== Charts ==
=== Weekly charts ===
Chart (1991)	Peak position
Australia (ARIA)	180
Austria (Ö3 Austria Top 40)	1
Europe (Eurochart Hot 100)	11
Germany (GfK)	2
Greece (IFPI)	2
Israel (Israeli Singles Chart)	29
Italy (Musica e dischi)	17
Netherlands (Dutch Top 40)	24
Netherlands (Single Top 100)	25
Portugal (AFP)	2
Spain (AFYVE)	7
Sweden (Sverigetopplistan)	7
Switzerland (Schweizer Hitparade)	3

=== Year-end charts ===
Chart (1991)	Position
Austria (Ö3 Austria Top 40)	15
Europe (Eurochart Hot 100)	29
Germany (Media Control)	15
Sweden (Topplistan)	23
Switzerland (Schweizer Hitparade)	18

== Certifications ==
Region	Certification	Certified units/sales
Sweden (GLF)	Gold	25,000^{^}
^{^} Shipments figures based on certification alone.

== See also ==
- List of number-one hits of 1991 (Austria)
