= Basic Element (band) =

Swedish Eurodance dance / eurodance group

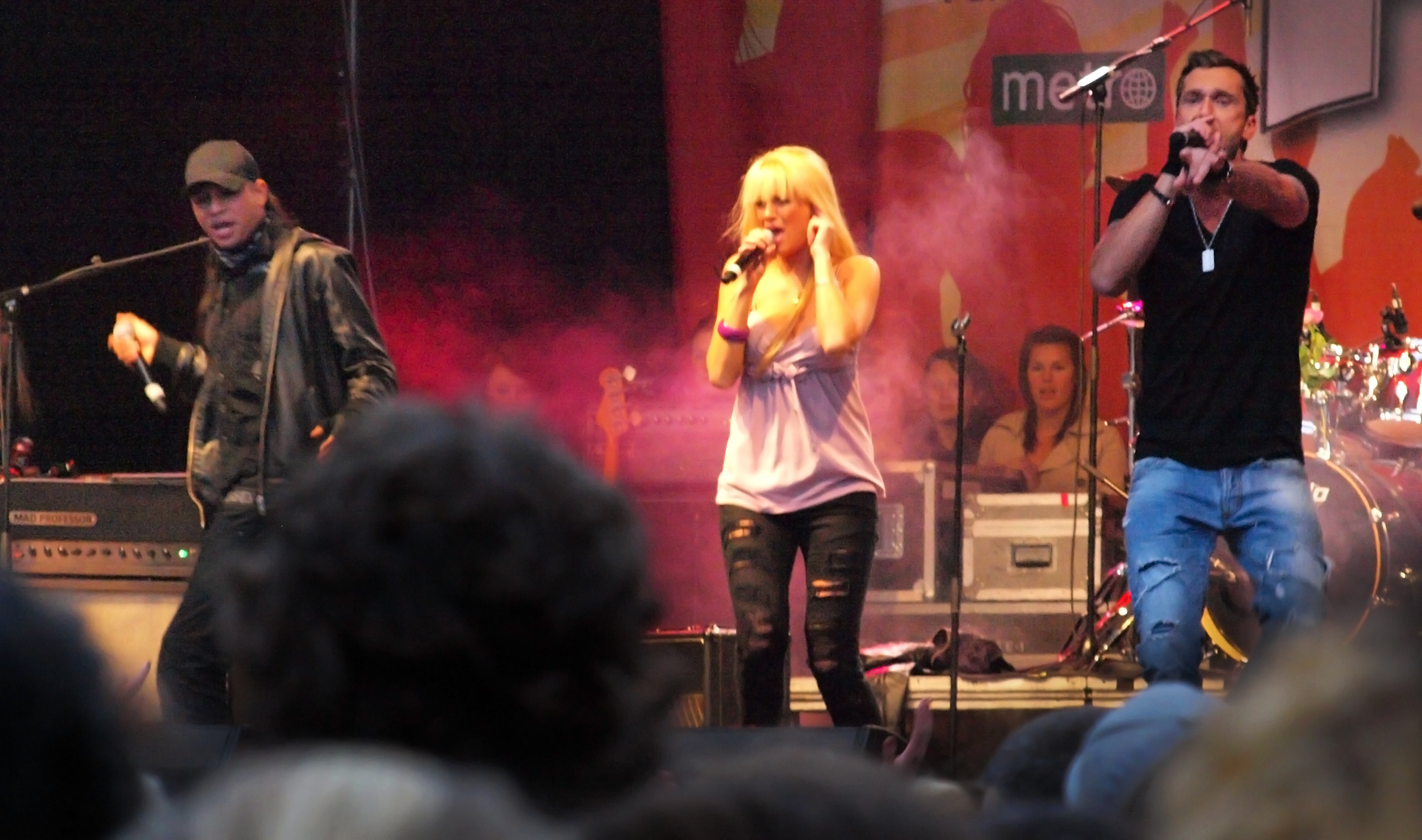
- Basic Element on stage in Falun, Sweden, 2009

Background information
- Origin: Sweden
- Genres: Eurodance
- Years active: 1993–1999, 2005–present
- Members: Peter Thelenius; Linda Thelenius; Jonas Wesslander
- Past members: Zetma Prenbo (1993–1995); Caesar Zamini (1993–1995); Saunet Sparell (1995–1997); Marie Fredriksson (1998–2007); Andrea Myrander (2007–2011)
- Website: https://basicelementofficial.se/

Basic Element is a Swedish Eurodance hip-hop group formed in 1992 in Malmö, Sweden. The group originally consisted of rapper/singer Peter Thelenius (Petrus), keyboardist Cesar Zamini, and accordion and vocalist Zetma Prenbo. Later vocalists were Saunet Sparell, Marie Fredriksson (not to be confused with the Roxette singer Marie Fredriksson).

Currently, the band consists of the original member and founder Peter Thelenius, along with his wife Linda Thelenius and Jonas Wesslander.

== History ==
Peter Thelenius and Cesar Zamini began the group in 1992, searched for a singer through the employment office and found Zetma. In 1993, they made a record deal with EMI Records, releasing their first single "Move Me". In 1994, "Move Me" was followed up by "The Promise Man", which reached No.1 in the Swedish singles chart.

In 1995, Zetma left the band (because of her pregnancy) and Saunet Sparell replaced her. The new album "The Ultimate Ride" (including the singles "The Ride" and "The Fiddle") was released. Peter and Caesar started to have disagreements about the band's future, and as a result Cesar left the band. The group's third album, "Star Tracks", had a more 1970s disco sound. Sparell subsequently left the band because she thought that Thelenius only cared about being famous, and so the project was put on ice.

In 1997, Peter released a solo album, "Trust Then Pain", under the name "Petrus". In 1998, Basic Element returned with a new album (with the original Eurodance sound) with Marie Fredriksson as the new singer, but from 1999 the two members went on a hiatus..

In 2005, the group returned with a remake of their 1995 hit "This Must Be a Dream" and Mathias Olofson as a new member. In February 2006, they released a new single, "Raise the Gain", featuring Charlie King and with a slightly different sound. On 7 February 2007, the group released its comeback album "The Empire Strikes Back". Later in 2007, Marie Fredriksson left the group and was replaced by Andrea Myrander as the singer and Jonas Wesslander as the producer and rapper. In 2008, the album "The Truth" was released in cooperation with the producer Tomas Kollder. The band released a new song, "Got You Screaming", in 2010. In January 2011, it was announced on the group's home page that Andrea Myrander had officially left. A few months later, in May 2011, a new single, "Turn Me On", was announced during a concert. It was posted on YouTube on 27 May.

In April 2012 Basic Element signed a deal with the Swedish record label Family Tree, and on 24 April, a song called "Shades" (featuring Max C and Taz) was posted on YouTube. Without a female singer, the songs featured only male vocals, and represented a further change in style since their 2005 comeback. A YouTube commenter described it as a mixture of Avicii, Swedish House Mafia and "We Found Love" by Rihanna and Calvin Harris. Vocalist Max C was featured on Swedish House Mafia member Axwell’s single "I Found You".

In 2014 Andrea Myrander rejoined the band for around one year, and they released a new single, "Someone Out there", featuring UK rapper Taz; this was performed for the first time during a "We love the 90s" live show in Helsinki, Finland.

In 2016 Peter and Jonas collaborated with Dr. Alban on a new single, "Good To You", with another change in sound and a different producer.

== Discography ==
=== Albums ===
- Basic Injection (1994)
- The Ultimate Ride (1995)
- Star Tracks (1996)
- Trust Then Pain (Peter's solo album) (1997)
- The Earthquake (1998)
- The Empire Strikes Back (2007)
- The Truth (2008)

=== Singles ===
Year	Single	Peak chart positions					Certifications (sales thresholds)
Year	Single	CIS	DEN	EUR	FIN	SWE	Certifications (sales thresholds)
1993	"Move Me"	—	6	—	—	—	
1993	"The Promise Man"	—	6	33	6	3	
1994	"Touch"	—	9	—	7	3	
1994	"Leave It Behind"	—	—	—	—	11	
1994	"The Ride"	—	5	20	2	2	
1995	"The Fiddle"	—	—	—	3	5	
1995	"This Must Be a Dream"	—	—	—	8	10	
1995	"Queen of Love"	—	—	—	13	27	
1996	"Shame"	—	—	—	8	23	
1996	"Take Me Up"	—	—	—	—	—	
1996	"Rule Your World"	—	—	—	10	—	
1996	"Heaven Can't Wait"	—	—	—	—	—	
1998	"Rok the World"	—	—	—	—	13	
1998	"Love 4 Real"	—	—	—	—	—	
1998	"Earthquake"	—	—	—	—	—	
2005	"This Must Be a Dream" (re-release)	—	—	—	—	7	
2006	"Raise the Gain"	—	—	—	—	35	
2006	"I'll Never Let You Know"	—	—	—	2	5	
2007	"To You"	45	—	—	8	—	
2008	"Feelings"	141	—	—	—	—	
2008	"Touch You Right Now"	2	—	—	—	10	
2009	"The Fish"	—	—	—	—	—	
2010	"Got U Screaming"	195	—	—	—	—	
2011	"Turn Me On"	—	—	—	—	—	
2012	"Shades" (feat. Max C.)	—	—	—	—	—	
2014	"Someone Out There" (feat. TAZ)	—	—	—	—	—	
2016	"Good to You" (feat. Dr. Alban)	—	—	—	—	—	
2022	"Life is Now" (feat. Dr. Alban, Waldo's People and Elize Ryd)	—	—	—	—	—	
"—" denotes releases that did not chart
