= Born in Africa (Dr. Alban album) =

Studio album by Dr. Alban
- Released: 9 April 1996
- Recorded: 1995–1996
- Genre: Electronica, eurodance, house
- Label: Ariola

Dr. Alban chronology
Look Who's Talking (1994)	Born in Africa (1996)	I Believe (1997)

Singles from Born in Africa
- 1. "This Time I'm Free" Released: 1995; 2. "Born in Africa" Released: 1996; 3. "Hallelujah Day" Released: 1996

Born in Africa is the fourth studio album by Swedish-Nigerian artist Dr. Alban. It was released in 1996.

== Track listing ==
1. "Born in Africa" (Original Radio Version) (3:30)
2. "Riddle of Life" (2:42)
3. "Alabalaba (Woman'a'Sexy)" (3:19)
4. "Hallelujah Day" (3:18)
5. "Rock Steady" (4:16)
6. "I Feel the Music" (3:16)
7. "Then I Fell in Love" (3:09)
8. "I Said It Once" (4:05)
9. "Rich Man / Poor Man" (3:10)
10. "This Time I'm Free" (3:50)
11. "So Long" (3:39)
12. "Feel Like Making Love" (5:01)
13. "Rock The Woman" / "Shake It" (Todd Terry Mix) (3:29)
14. "This Time I'm Free" (Todd Terry Remix-Edit) (4:17)
15. "Born in Africa" (Pierre J's Radio Remix) (3:40)

== Charts ==
Chart (1997)	Peak Position
Austrian Albums (Ö3 Austria)	41
Finnish Albums (Suomen virallinen lista)	12
German Albums (Offizielle Top 100)	52
Hungarian Albums (MAHASZ)	12
Swedish Albums (Sverigetopplistan)	37
Swiss Albums (Schweizer Hitparade)	37
