= Dr. Alban =

Nigerian-Swedish musician (born 1957)

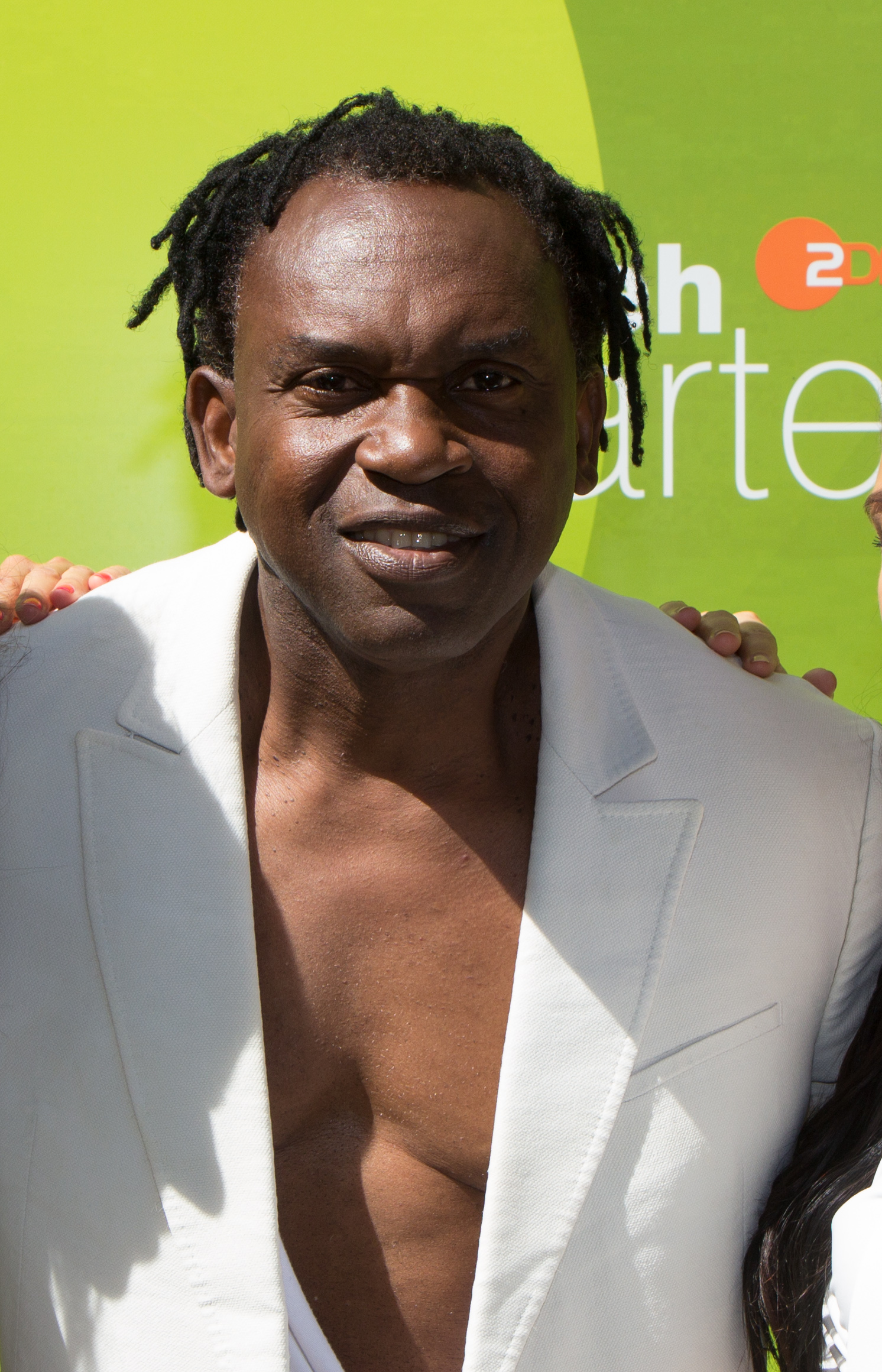
- Dr. Alban in 2018

Background information
- Born: Alban Uzoma Nwapa; 26 August 1957 (age 69); Oguta, Imo, Federation of Nigeria
- Origin: Stockholm, Sweden
- Genres: Eurodance; hip-hop; reggae; dancehall
- Occupations: Singer; rapper; producer
- Instrument: Vocals
- Years active: 1980s–present
- Labels: Dr. Alban Records; Ariola
- Website: dralban.net

Ogbuagu Alban Uzoma Nwapa (born 26 August 1957), better known by his stage name Dr. Alban, is a Nigerian-Swedish musician and producer with his own record label, Dr. Records. His music can best be described as Eurodance/hip-hop reggae in a dancehall style. He has sold an estimated 16 million records worldwide and is most famous for his worldwide 1992 hit "It's My Life", from the album One Love. He travelled to Sweden at age 23 to study dentistry and became a DJ to finance his studies.

== Life and career ==
=== Early life ===
Alban was born Alban Uzoma Nwapa into a middle-class family of ten children in Oguta, Imo state, Nigeria. He is Igbo.

=== Education ===
He got his secondary education at Christ the King College and spent most of his youth in his hometown of Oguta. At age 23, he travelled to Sweden to study dentistry at Lund University. To finance his studies, Dr. Alban became a DJ at the Stockholm club Alphabet Street.

=== Denniz Pop and achieving success: 1990s ===
In 1990, he met Denniz Pop from the SweMix label and, together with Denniz and rap artist Leila K, released his first record Hello Afrika. At this point, he took the stage name Dr. Alban, a nod to his dental studies. His debut album included hits like "Hello Afrika" and "No Coke", both of which ended up being million-selling singles. The album itself was quite successful and earned him gold certification awards in numerous markets including Germany (for sales of over 250,000 units), Austria (25,000), and Switzerland (25,000).

One year later, this success was surpassed by his second album One Love. The album included European hit singles such as "It's My Life" and "Sing Hallelujah". The single "It's My Life" reached No. 1 in Israel, Austria, the Netherlands, Sweden, and Germany, and No. 2 in Norway, Switzerland, and the United Kingdom. The song "It's My Life" went platinum in Germany (for sales of over 500,000 units), in the Netherlands (75,000), and it sold over two million copies overall in Europe. The album in turn reached the top of the album chart in Austria and entered the top five in Switzerland, also reaching No. 6 in Germany. It went gold in Germany (for sales of over 250,000 units) and platinum both in Austria and Switzerland (both 50,000).

Alban's third album Look Who's Talking!, released in 1994, hit the top 10 in numerous markets including Germany, Switzerland, and Austria. The album was the first to earn Alban a gold certification award in his home country of Sweden for sales of over 50,000 units.

Dr. Alban founded his own record label Dr. Records, whereon he released his 1996 album Born in Africa. The album was unable to match the success of his previous releases. It only reached No. 12 in Finland, while it peaked at No. 37 in Switzerland and Sweden, No. 52 in Germany, and No. 41 in Austria. The single "Born in Africa" went to number 1 in Finland.

In 1997, Alban released the compilation album The Very Best of 1990–1997, which only charted in Austria, Sweden, and Germany. The same year, the artist also released the studio album Believe, which peaked at No. 27 in Sweden, No. 30 in Finland, and No. 41 in Austria. In late 1998, Dr. Alban released a single with German-based artist Sash!, entitled "Colour the World", which experienced moderate chart success in Europe.

=== Decline and return to music: 2000s ===
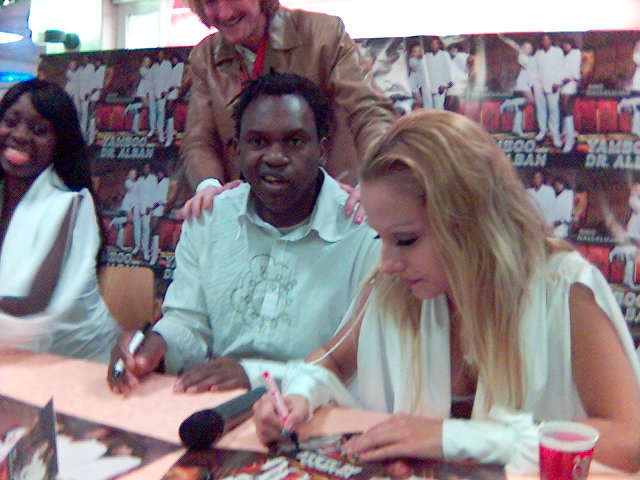
Dr. Alban and Yamboo signing autographs in 2005, promoting the 1993 single "Sing Hallelujah!"

In 2000, Alban released the single "What Do I Do", which charted only in Sweden at No. 43; it spent only two weeks on the charts there. The album Prescription was a flop, as it failed to chart anywhere.

In 2007, after years of absence from the music scene, Dr. Alban released the studio album Back to Basics. It was sold on the internet only through Dr. Alban's official website. In Russia, however, physical CDs and cassettes were released.

=== Later activities: 2010s–present ===
In 2010, Alban collaborated once again with Sash! to produce a remake of "Hello Afrika", "Hello South Afrika", dedicated to the 2010 FIFA World Cup. It was followed by a single consisting of 16 remixes.

On 15 February 2014 at the Scandinavium arena in Gothenburg, Dr. Alban teamed up with Jessica Folcker and arrived in fifth place in the third heat of Melodifestivalen 2014, with the song "Around the World", to win the right to represent Sweden at the Eurovision Song Contest 2014 in Copenhagen, Denmark.

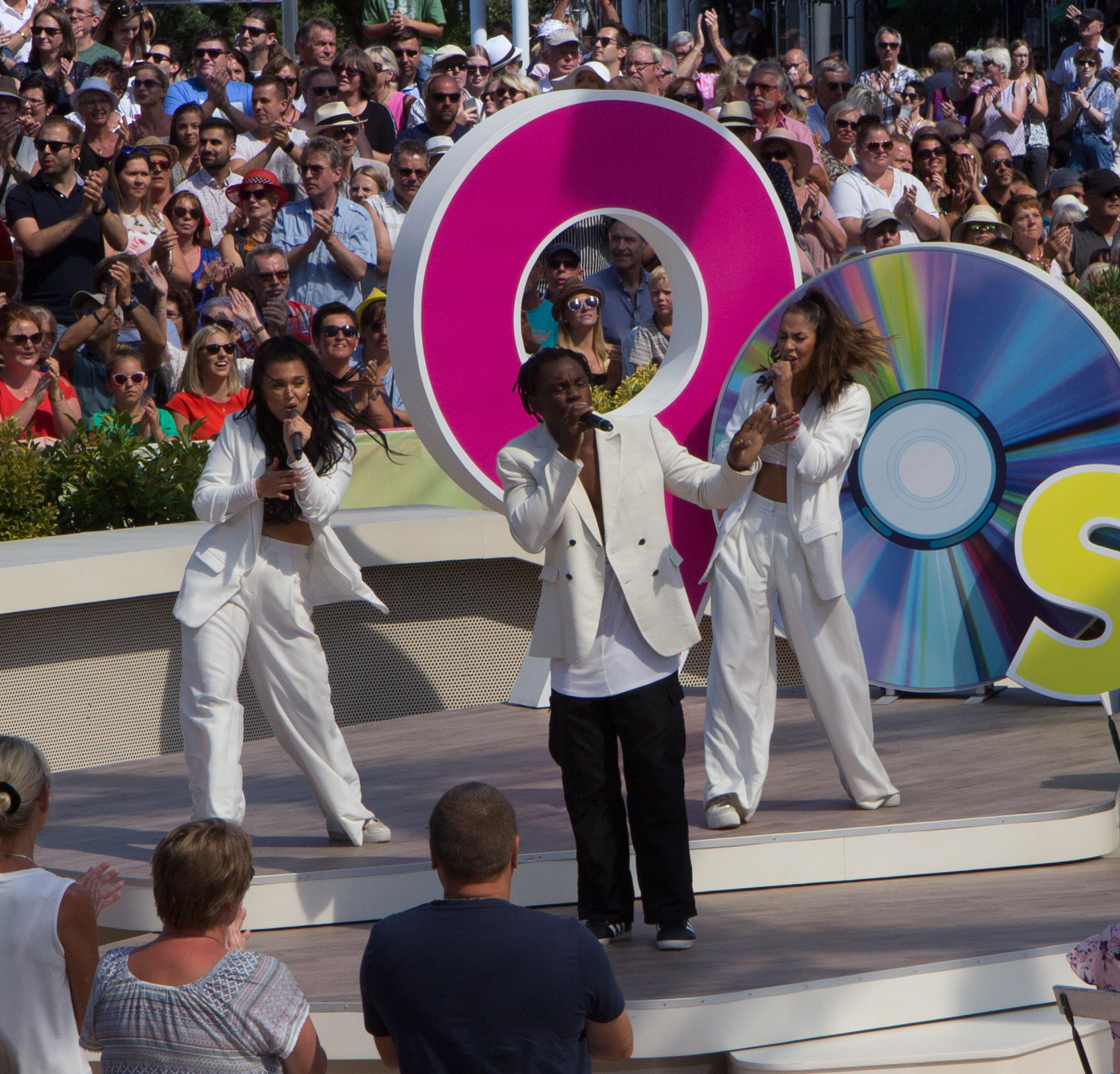
Dr. Alban performing on ZDF-Fernsehgarten in 2018

In 2015, he released the single "Hurricane", which failed to enter the European charts.

In May 2020, Alban released the song "Hello Sverige" (in Swedish) to encourage the population of Sweden to respect social distancing measures put in place to counteract the COVID-19 pandemic. The next month, he released an English version titled "Hello Nations". The song is another remake of his classic hit "Hello Afrika".

In June 2020, Alban released the single "Drama", also in Swedish, in collaboration with singer Folkhemmet. The song talks about Alban's long-running acrimonious relationship with Swedish tabloid journalists.

=== Personal life ===
Alban met his future wife, Swedish teacher Katrine "Kin" Hermansson, in 2004, through footballer Tomas Brolin. The couple had two daughters together. They divorced in 2021, and Alban has since continued to live in Stockholm.

A member of the Nigerian chieftaincy system, Alban is entitled to use the pre-nominal honorific Ogbuagu, due to his membership of the Igbuu title society of Oguta.

== Discography ==
=== Studio albums ===
List of studio albums, with selected chart positions
Title	Album details	Peak chart positions								Certifications
Title	Album details	SWE	AUS	AUT	FIN	GER	NLD	NOR	SWI	Certifications
Hello Afrika	Released: 18 February 1991; Label: Ariola; Formats: LP, CD, cassette	6	—	2	29	11	43	—	8	BVMI: Gold; IFPI AUT: Gold; IFPI SWI: Gold
One Love	Released: 4 May 1992; Label: Ariola; Formats: LP, CD, cassette	15	149	1	4	6	20	15	3	BVMI: Gold; IFPI AUT: Platinum; IFPI SWI: Platinum
Look Who's Talking!	Released: 25 March 1994; Label: Ariola; Formats: LP, CD, cassette	11	98	7	4	7	28	13	8	GLF: Gold
Born in Africa	Released: 9 April 1996; Label: Ariola; Formats: LP, CD, cassette	37	—	41	12	52	—	—	37	
I Believe	Released: 1 October 1997; Label: Metrovynil (EAMS Lesser); Formats: LP, CD, cassette	27	—	41	30	—	—	—	—	
Prescription	Released: 26 November 2001; Label: Rough Trade/Dr. Records; Formats: CD, cassette	—	—	—	—	—	—	—	—	
Back to Basics	Released: 13 November 2008; Label: Haring Records/Dr. Records; Formats: Digital download, CD	—	—	—	—	—	—	—	—	
"—" denotes releases that did not chart or were not released.

=== Compilations ===
List of compilation albums, with selected chart positions
Title	Album details	Peak chart positions		
Title	Album details	SWE	AUT	GER
The Very Best of 1990–1997	Released: 30 June 1997; Label: Ariola; Formats: LP, CD, cassette	38	38	66

=== Singles ===
==== As lead artist ====
List of singles as lead artist, with selected chart positions
Title	Year	Peak chart positions										Certifications	Album
Title	Year	SWE	AUS	AUT	FIN	GER	NLD	SPA	SWI	UK	US	Certifications	Album
"Hello Afrika" (featuring Leila K.)	1990	7	180	1	—	2	25	7	3	146	—	GLF: Gold	Hello Afrika
"No Coke"	1990	1	—	2	12	3	7	6	3	84	—	GLF: Platinum	Hello Afrika
"U & Mi"	1991	20	—	11	6	14	—	15	9	—	—		Hello Afrika
"(Sing Shi-Wo-Wo) Stop the Pollution"	1991	36	—	16	3	—	—	—	13	—	—		Hello Afrika
"It's My Life"	1992	1	43	1	5	1	1	11	2	2	88	BPI: Silver; BVMI: Platinum; IFPI AUT: Gold; NVPI: Platinum	One Love
"One Love"	1992	19	193	9	7	7	14	—	11	45	—		One Love
"Sing Hallelujah"	1993	6	5	7	2	4	6	8	4	16	—	ARIA: Platinum; BVMI: Platinum	One Love
"Look Who's Talking"	1994	2	215	3	1	3	4	2	6	55	—		Look Who's Talking!
"Away from Home"	1994	24	92	12	2	25	45	5	26	42	—		Look Who's Talking!
"Let the Beat Go On"	1994	17	186	23	3	18	19	—	—	—	—		Look Who's Talking!
"Sweet Dreams" (featuring Swing)	1995	12	—	—	4	—	44	—	—	59	—		Non-album single
"This Time I'm Free"	1995	3	—	23	1	27	35	—	32	—	—		Born in Africa
"Born in Africa"	1996	11	—	31	1	—	—	—	47	—	—		Born in Africa
"Hallelujah Day"	1996	30	—	35	12	—	—	—	—	—	—		Born in Africa
"It's My Life '97" (featuring Sash!)	1997	—	—	—	18	—	—	—	—	—	—		The Very Best of 1990–1997
"Guess Who's Coming to Dinner (Carolina)"	1997	6	—	—	—	—	—	—	—	—	—		I Believe
"Mr. DJ"	1997	—	—	21	8	70	—	3	—	—	—		I Believe
"Long Time Ago"	1997	55	—	—	15	—	—	15	—	—	—		I Believe
"Feel the Rhythm"	1998	56	—	—	—	—	—	13	—	—	—		I Believe
"What Do I Do"	2000	43	—	—	—	—	—	—	—	—	—		Prescription
"Because of You"	2002	—	—	—	—	—	—	—	—	—	—		Prescription
"Work, Work"	2003	13	—	—	19	—	—	—	—	—	—		Non-album single
"Habibi" (featuring Melissa)	2008	—	—	—	—	—	—	—	—	—	—		Back to Basics
"We Love the 90's" (featuring Haddaway)	2008	—	—	—	—	—	—	—	—	—	—		Non-album singles
"Freedom"	2012	—	—	—	—	—	—	—	—	—	—		Non-album singles
"Loverboy"	2012	—	—	—	—	—	—	—	—	—	—		Non-album singles
"It's My Life 2014"	2014	—	—	39	—	29	—	—	—	—	—		Non-album singles
"Around the World" (featuring Jessica Folcker)	2014	52	—	—	—	—	—	—	—	—	—		Non-album singles
"Hurricane"	2015	—	—	—	—	—	—	—	—	—	—		Non-album singles
"Drama" (Dr. Alban & Folkhemmet, in Swedish)	2020	—	—	—	—	—	—	—	—	—	—		Non-album singles
"Change (I Have a Dream)" (featuring Whitney Peyton)	2022	—	—	—	—	—	—	—	—	—	—		Non-album singles
"—" denotes releases that did not chart or were not released.

==== As featured artist ====
List of singles as featured artist, with selected chart positions
Title	Year	Peak chart positions							Album
Title	Year	SWE	FIN	FRA	GER	NL	SWI	UK	Album
"Papaya Coconut" (Kikki Danielsson featuring Dr. Alban)	1998	22	—	—	—	—	—	—	Non-album singles
"Colour the World" (Sash! featuring Dr. Alban)	1999	54	—	—	39	69	39	15	Non-album singles
"Sing Hallelujah (New Version)" (Yamboo featuring Dr. Alban)	2005	—	12	—	—	—	—	—	Okama de Mapouka
"Chiki Chiki" (Starclub featuring Dr. Alban)	2006	—	—	—	—	—	—	—	Non-album singles
"It's My Life (Don't Worry)" (Chawki featuring Dr. Alban)	2014	—	—	187	—	—	—	—	Non-album singles
"Good to You" (Basic Element featuring Dr. Alban)	2016	—	—	—	—	—	—	—	Non-album singles
"It's My Life" (Popek featuring Dr. Alban)	2020	—	—	—	—	—	—	—	Non-album singles
"Life Is Now" (Basic Element, Dr. Alban, Waldo's People featuring Elize Ryd)	2022	—	—	—	—	—	—	—	Non-album singles
"—" denotes releases that did not chart or were not released.
