= Sing Hallelujah! (Dr. Alban song) =

Single by Dr. Alban

from the album One Love
- Released: 1 February 1993
- Genre: Eurodance; dance-pop
- Length: 4:00 (short version); 4:24 (album version)
- Label: Cheiron; BMG
- Songwriters: Dr. Alban; Denniz Pop
- Producer: Denniz Pop

Dr. Alban singles chronology
"One Love" (1992)	"Sing Hallelujah!" (1993)	"Look Who's Talking" (1994)

Music video
- "Sing Hallelujah!" on YouTube

Audio sample
- Dr. Alban - "Sing Hallelujah" (Short): file; help

"Sing Hallelujah!" is a song by Sweden-based musician and producer Dr. Alban, released in February 1993, by Cheiron and BMG, as the third single from his second studio album, One Love (1992). The song, described as an "discothèques anthem with dance and disco sonorities", is written by Alban with its producer, Denniz Pop, and became a hit in many European countries. It was a top-five hit in Belgium, Denmark, Finland, Germany, Iceland and Switzerland. In the United Kingdom, it peaked at number 16 on the UK Singles Chart. The accompanying music video received heavy rotation on MTV Europe. "Sing Hallelujah" was nominated in the categories for Best Swedish Dance Track 1993 and Best Swedish Dance Video 1993 at the 1994 Swedish Dance Music Awards. In 2005, the song charted again when it was re-recorded by the artist in new versions, peaking at number 12 in Finland.

== Critical reception ==
Larry Flick from US magazine Billboard magazine noted that the song already had enjoyed a very hot run through much of England and Europe. He added, "The record's peppy pop/NRG personality is enhanced by rousing handclaps, insistent piano lines, and a chirpy gospel choir. Truly irresistible tune will have you raising your hands to the sky and singing along with the wonderfully catchy chorus." In his weekly UK chart commentary, James Masterton said, "The latest single is by no means as catchy as the last, has the disadvantage of not being embedded in the psyche of drunken Brits on the Costa Del Sol during the summer and is generally not very good anyway so further chart progress is unlikely." Pan-European magazine Music & Media commented, "Pulling teeth is apperently [sic] not so painful after all, because down at the doctor's a gospel choir breaks loose on a dance beat." Wendi Cermak from The Network Forty remarked that the song is "creating a buzz in the clubs".

== Chart performance ==
"Sing Hallelujah!" was a top-five hit in Belgium, Denmark, Finland, Germany , Iceland, Switzerland, as well as on the Eurochart Hot 100, where it peaked at number four. In Germany, it entered as number 77 and peaked seven weeks later. The song spent 33 weeks within the German singles chart. In addition, it was a top-10 hit in Austria (7), France, Greece, Ireland, the Netherlands, Norway, Portugal, and Sweden. In Sweden, the single debuted as number 32 on Sverigetopplistan, before peaking three weeks later. It spent eight weeks within the Swedish singles chart.

In the United Kingdom, "Sing Hallelujah!" only reached the UK Top 20, peaking at number 16 on the UK Singles Chart on April 25, 1993, after four weeks on the chart. On the Music Week Dance Singles chart and Record Mirror Club Chart, it reached numbers nine and eight, respectively. Outside Europe, the single was a top-5 hit in Australia, peaking at number five on the ARIA singles chart. In North America, it also peaked at number five on the Canadian RPM Dance chart, and at numbers 15 and 20 on the US Billboard Dance Club Play and Maxi-Singles Sales charts. In Africa, the song charted in Zimbabwe, peaking at number 11.

"Sing Hallelujah!" was awarded with a gold record in Denmark (45,000), a silver record in France, with a sale of 125,000 units, and a platinum record in Australia and Germany, after 70,000 and 500,000 singles were sold.

== Music video ==
The music video for "Sing Hallelujah" received heavy rotation on MTV Europe in March 1993. It was nominated in the category for Best Swedish Dance Video 1993 at the 1994 Swedish Dance Music Awards, but lost to "Down the Drain" by Stakka Bo. The video was later made available on Dr. Alban's official YouTube channel in 2011, having generated more than 7.5 million views as of early 2025.

== Impact and legacy ==
English DJ, producer and broadcaster Dave Pearce included "Sing Hallelujah!" in his all-time top 10 in 1997, saying, "A really anthemic vibe. I play this on special occasions and when it breaks down into the chorus it always gets a top reaction. It's guaranteed to put a smile on the face and to send knickers and handbags flying thru the air!"

== Track listings ==
- 12-inch single
1. "Sing Hallelujah!" (Long Version) – 6:30
2. "Sing Hallelujah!" (Paradise Dub) – 4:59
3. "Sing Hallelujah!" (Original Version) – 4:24
- CD single
1. "Sing Hallelujah!" (Short) – 4:00
2. "Sing Hallelujah!" (Long) – 6:30
- CD maxi
1. "Sing Hallelujah!" (Short) – 4:00
2. "Sing Hallelujah!" (Long) – 6:30
3. "Sing Hallelujah!" (Paradise Dub) – 4:59
4. "Sing Hallelujah!" (Original version) – 4:24
- 7-inch maxi – Remixes
1. "Sing Hallelujah!" (Easter Mix N.C.)
2. "Sing Hallelujah!" (Easter edit N.C.)
3. "Sing Hallelujah!" (DJ's Eurotrans remix)
- CD maxi - Remixes
1. "Sing Hallelujah!" (Easter Edit) – 3:58
2. "Sing Hallelujah!" (Easter Mix) – 7:29
3. "Sing Hallelujah!" (JJ's Eurotrans Mix) – 6:14

== Charts ==
=== Weekly charts ===
Chart (1993–1994)	Peak position
Austria (Ö3 Austria Top 40)	7
Belgium (Ultratop 50 Flanders)	3
Canada Dance/Urban (RPM)	5
Denmark (IFPI)	3
Europe (Eurochart Hot 100)	4
Europe (European Dance Radio)	6
Europe (European Hit Radio)	19
Finland (Suomen virallinen lista)	2
France (SNEP)	7
Germany (GfK)	4
Greece (Pop + Rock)	10
Iceland (Íslenski Listinn Topp 40)	5
Ireland (IRMA)	6
Israel (Israeli Singles Chart)	4
Netherlands (Dutch Top 40)	7
Netherlands (Single Top 100)	6
Norway (VG-lista)	8
Portugal (AFP)	7
Quebec (ADISQ)	44
Sweden (Sverigetopplistan)	6
Switzerland (Schweizer Hitparade)	4
UK Singles (Official Charts)	16
UK Airplay (Music Week)	28
UK Dance (Music Week)	9
UK Club Chart (Music Week)	8
US Dance Club Play (Billboard)	15
US Maxi-Singles Sales (Billboard)	20
Zimbabwe (ZIMA)	11

Chart (2005-2007)	Peak position
Finland (Suomen virallinen lista) Yamboo featuring Dr. Alban	12
Germany (GfK) Yamboo featuring Dr. Alban	74
Hungary (Dance Top 40) Yamboo featuring Dr. Alban	17

Chart (2017)	Peak position
Poland Airplay (ZPAV)	60

Chart (2022)	Peak position
Hungary (Single Top 40)	34

=== Year-end charts ===
Chart (1993)	Position
Austria (Ö3 Austria Top 40)	29
Belgium (Ultratop 50 Flanders)	11
Canada Dance/Urban (RPM)	37
Europe (Eurochart Hot 100)	14
Germany (Media Control)	8
Iceland (Íslenski Listinn Topp 40)	25
Israel (Israeli Singles Chart)	23
Netherlands (Dutch Top 40)	27
Netherlands (Single Top 100)	40
Sweden (Topplistan)	54
Switzerland (Schweizer Hitparade)	8
UK Club Chart (Music Week)	60

== Certifications and sales ==
Region	Certification	Certified units/sales
Australia (ARIA)	Platinum	70,000^{^}
Denmark (IFPI Danmark)	Platinum	90,000^{‡}
France (SNEP)	Silver	125,000^{*}
Germany (BVMI)	Platinum	500,000^{^}
^{*} Sales figures based on certification alone.^{^} Shipments figures based on certification alone.^{‡} Sales+streaming figures based on certification alone.

== Mozaic version ==
In 1995, Paul Oakenfold's Perfecto Records released a dance track based on an interpolation of "Sing Hallelujah!" called "Sing It (The Hallelujah Song)". Credited to an act called Mozaic, the song became a hit in the UK, debuting at its peak position of No. 14 in August 1995. In 2015, Oakenfold would include the "Quivvers Dirty Dub" mix of the song on his compilation album 25 Years of Perfecto Records.
