= Denniz Pop =

Swedish DJ and record producer (1963–1998)

Denniz PoP
- Denniz Pop in 1998

Background information
- Also known as: Denniz PoP; Dagge
- Born: Dag Krister Volle; 26 April 1963; Tullinge, Sweden
- Died: 30 August 1998 (aged 35) Solna, Sweden
- Genres: Pop; electronic
- Occupations: DJ; music producer; songwriter

Dag Krister Volle (26 April 1963 – 30 August 1998), better known as Denniz Pop (stylized Denniz PoP), was a Swedish DJ, music producer, and songwriter. He was a member of the DJ collective SweMix and later co-founded the recording studio Cheiron Studios in Stockholm in 1992.

== Life and career ==
Volle was born on 26 April 1963 in Tullinge, Sweden, to Norwegian immigrants. He began DJing in the 1980s and started producing remixed records and later original releases. In 1986, he co-founded the DJ collective and remix service SweMix with Robert Wåtz (of Rob'n'Raz fame), which also included StoneBridge. In 1988, he released the track "Gimme Some Mo' (Bass on Me)" under his own name.

Volle met the Nigerian-Swedish singer Dr. Alban while they were both DJing, and in 1990, he produced his debut single, "Hello Afrika", and the subsequent eponymous album, which were released under the SweMix label. In 1992, he left SweMix and together with music investor Tom Talomaa, founded Cheiron Studios in Stockholm; the next year, he recruited Max Martin. In the following years, he co-produced and co-wrote songs for several successful Swedish and foreign artists, including Leila K, 3T, Ace of Base, Backstreet Boys, Britney Spears, *NSYNC, E-Type, Robyn, and 5ive.

In an interview, Volle said that he took the name "Denniz" from the Dennis the Menace comic book and then added "pop" to it.

== Illness and death ==
In December 1997, Volle was diagnosed with stomach cancer and underwent surgery. Though his recovery was successful, he later relapsed and died in August 1998, at the age of 35. The video to the Backstreet Boys' "Show Me the Meaning of Being Lonely" and Jessica Folcker's song "A Little Bit" were dedicated to him. E-Type's 1998 album, Last Man Standing, commemorates Volle with a dirge, titled "PoP Preludium". Britney Spears dedicated her award for best song at the 1999 MTV Europe Music Awards to him.

== Legacy ==
The Denniz Pop Awards were created in 2013 by former members of Cheiron Studios to help distinguish Scandinavian songwriters, producers, and artists. Notable winners include Swedish House Mafia, Avicii, Winona Oak, Mabel, and Snoh Aalegra. Cheiron became the start of a Swedish wave of successful producers and songwriters, with Max Martin as the biggest star. Other prominent producers who were part of the studio include Rami Yacoub, Kristian Lundin, Per Magnusson, Jörgen Elofsson, and Andreas Carlsson.

== Awards and recognition ==
In 1998, Volle, together with Max Martin, received the Honorary Jury Prize at the Grammis, Sweden's oldest music award ceremony, though at the time, he was too ill to accept the trophy in person.

In 2016, he was inducted into the Swedish Music Hall of Fame.

== Production discography ==
Year	Artist	Title	Production	Writing
1988	Denniz Pop	"Gimme Some Mo' (Bass on Me)"	Producer	Writer
1990	Dr. Alban	Hello Afrika	Sole producer	Co-written with Alban Uzoma Nwapa
1992	Ace of Base	Happy Nation	Co-producer	
1992	Dr. Alban	One Love	Co-producer	Co-written with Alban Uzoma Nwapa
1993	Leila K	Carousel	Co-producer	Co-writing credit
1993	Ace of Base	The Sign	Co-producer	
1994	Dr. Alban	Look Who's Talking	Co-producer	Co-writing credit
1994	E-Type	Made in Sweden	Co-producer	
1995	3T	Brotherhood	Co-producer	Co-writing credit on "Gotta Be You"
1995	Ace of Base	The Bridge	Co-producer	
1995	Herbie	Fingers	Co-producer	Co-writing credit
1995	Rednex	Sex & Violins	Co-producer	
1995	Robyn	Robyn Is Here	Co-producer	Co-writing credit on "Do You Know (What It Takes)"
1996	Backstreet Boys	Backstreet Boys	Co-producer	Co-writing credit on "We've Got It Goin' On", "I Wanna Be with You", "Nobody But You"
1996	E-Type	The Explorer	Co-producer	
1996	Leila K	Manic Panic	Co-producer	
1996	Michèle	"Do Me Baby" (single)	Co-producer	Co-writing credit
1997	NSYNC	NSYNC	Co-producer	Co-writing credit on "I Want You Back"
1997	Backstreet Boys	Backstreet's Back	Co-producer	Co-writing credit on "Everybody (Backstreet's Back)", "That's the Way I Like It",
1998	5ive	5ive	Co-producer	Co-writing credit on "Slam Dunk (Da Funk)", "Partyline 555-On-Line", "Don't You Want It", "Straight Up Funk"
1998	Jessica	Jessica	Co-producer	Co-writing credit
