= Don't Turn Around =

1986 song by Tina Turner

Song by Tina Turner
- A-side: "Typical Male"
- Released: August 1986
- Genre: Rock
- Length: 4:19
- Label: Capitol
- Songwriters: Albert Hammond; Diane Warren
- Producers: Bryan Adams; Bob Clearmountain

Audio video
- "Don't Turn Around" (2022 remaster) on YouTube

"Don't Turn Around" is a popular song written by Albert Hammond and Diane Warren. It was originally recorded by American singer Tina Turner and released as the B-side to her 1986 hit single "Typical Male". It has since been included on Turner's compilation album The Collected Recordings: Sixties to Nineties (1994), as well as featuring in the Tina musical since 2018.

The song has been covered by numerous artists, most notably by Luther Ingram in 1987, Aswad in 1988, Bonnie Tyler in 1988, Eyes in 1990, Neil Diamond in 1991, Ace of Base in 1993, and Albert Hammond in 2010.

== Aswad version ==
"Don't Turn Around"

Single by Aswad

from the album Distant Thunder
- B-side: "Woman"
- Released: February 10, 1988
- Recorded: 1987
- Genre: Reggae fusion
- Length: 6:56
- Label: Mango; Island
- Producer: Chris Porter

Aswad singles chronology
"Hooked on You" (1987)	"Don't Turn Around" (1988)	"Give a Little Love" (1988)

Music video
- "Don't Turn Around" on YouTube

British reggae group Aswad heard Luther Ingram's version and released a cover version on February 10, 1988. This version samples a verse from the Righteous Brothers' 1964 single "You've Lost That Lovin' Feelin'", as well as elements of the song closely resembling that of Erma Franklin's 1967 single "Piece of My Heart". The song was released as the first single from their eleventh album, Distant Thunder (1988), and went to number one on the UK Singles Chart in March 1988. It also peaked at number one for two consecutive weeks in New Zealand in June 1988. It also reached number 45 on the Billboard Hot R&B/Hip-Hop Songs in the US that same year.

=== Charts ===
==== Weekly charts ====
Chart (1988)	Peak position
Australia (ARIA)	34
Belgium (Ultratop 50 Flanders)	6
Denmark (IFPI)	7
Finland (Suomen virallinen lista)	26
Ireland (IRMA)	4
Italy Airplay (Music & Media)	7
Netherlands (Dutch Top 40)	5
Netherlands (Single Top 100)	5
New Zealand (Recorded Music NZ)	1
Norway (VG-lista)	10
Switzerland (Schweizer Hitparade)	13
UK Singles (Official Charts)	1
US Hot R&B/Hip-Hop Songs (Billboard)	45
West Germany (GfK)	29

==== Year-end charts ====
Chart (1988)	Position
Belgium (Ultratop 50 Flanders)	83
Netherlands (Dutch Top 40)	65
Netherlands (Single Top 100)	65
New Zealand (RIANZ)	13

=== Certifications ===
Region	Certification	Certified units/sales
New Zealand (RMNZ)	Gold	15,000^{‡}
United Kingdom (BPI)	Silver	250,000^{^}
^{^} Shipments figures based on certification alone.^{‡} Sales+streaming figures based on certification alone.

== Ace of Base version ==
"Don't Turn Around"
- Scandinavian CD single; artwork also used on other European releases with different title layouts

Single by Ace of Base

from the album Happy Nation (U.S. version) and The Sign
- B-side: "Young and Proud" (EU); "Dancer in a Daydream" (NA)
- Released: March 14, 1994
- Recorded: 1993
- Studio: Tuffs, Gothenburg, Sweden
- Genre: Reggae fusion; synth-pop; Europop
- Length: 3:50
- Label: Arista (US and Japan); Mega (Europe)
- Songwriters: Albert Hammond; Diane Warren; (rap segment by Ulf Ekberg)
- Producers: Tommy Ekman; Per Adebratt

Ace of Base singles chronology
"The Sign" (1993)	"Don't Turn Around" (1994)	"Living in Danger" (1994)

Music video
- "Don't Turn Around" on YouTube

In 1993, Swedish pop group Ace of Base recorded a minor-key version of "Don't Turn Around" for their US debut album, The Sign (1993). The song, produced by Tommy Ekman and Per Adebratt, was the follow-up to the group's successful single, "The Sign", and was also included on the re-release of Happy Nation the same year. Their version was released in March 1994 by Arista and Mega Records, reaching number one in Canada, number four in the US and number five in the UK. It was the third most popular song in the United States in the summer of 1994. Its accompanying music video, directed by Matt Broadley and filmed in Florida, received heavy rotation on music television channels in both Europe and the US. "Don't Turn Around" was nominated in the category for Best Cover at the 1994 MTV Europe Music Awards.

=== Background and recording ===
I thought it was too much in major. We thought, 'If [Arista] really wants us to do it, why not?' The lyrics were good. We thought if we can transform it a bit into minor, in the chorus and so on, it could be OK.

— Jonas Berggren talking to Billboard about the song.

After the huge success of the band's European debut album, Happy Nation, American label Arista wanted to release it with some new tracks for the US market. They suggested that Ace of Base should make a cover on British reggae group Aswad's 1988 version of "Don't Turn Around". It was recorded and produced at Tuff Studios in Gothenburg, Sweden by Tommy Ekman and Per Adebratt.

This version by the band would also contain a rap segment made and written by band member Ulf Ekberg.

=== Critical reception ===
AllMusic editor Stephen Thomas Erlewine stated that with singles like "All That She Wants", "The Sign", and "Don't Turn Around", "it's easy to see why they were hits – the beat is relentless and the hooks are incessantly catchy." In a retrospective review, Annie Zaleski from The A.V. Club felt that Ace of Base gave the song "a brisk, breezy vibe that verges on tropical". Larry Flick from Billboard magazine wrote that the Swedish pop phenomenon "will, once again, blaze up the Hot 100 with its slick, lightweight reading of a tune popularized by Aswad." He added that here, "thin but inoffensive vocals are laid over the kind of synth-smart pop/reggae arrangement that top 40 programmers regularly subscribe to." Troy J. Augusto from Cash Box commented, "Can these Swedish hitmakers make it three-for-three? You can bet on it, with the release of the next single from the quartet's smash The Sign, a song made popular in reggae circles by Aswad. Will follow the likes of Big Mountain, etc., up the charts with its easy-listening, synth-flavored mix of reggae and lightweight dance." He also deemed it a "potential summertime smash", adding, "One has to wonder. "What's in the water over at Arista?!"". David Browne from Entertainment Weekly remarked that "the jauntily forlorn" song is "preeminent Europop, all brassy hooks, rushing beats, and exuberant singing that brings to mind Swedish cheerleaders in an ABBA cabaret."

Dave Sholin from the Gavin Report noted that "for their third time at the plate this sensational pop foursome is about take a trip around the bases with what is another surefire home run!" In his weekly UK chart commentary, James Masterton wrote, "Ace of Base's version borrows from the Aswad arrangement but transform it still further from being the simple pop song it was originally into a mournful ballad, dark and mysterious. Whether it is as big as past hits is open to question but it gets my vote for simply daring to reinterpret the track so drastically. Are you listening Big Mountain?" Ian Gittins from Melody Maker said, "Ace of Base half-want to be slick, Culture Beat-style Eurocheese, half-want to be Abba, and find a surprisingly pleasing halfway house." Mario Tarradell from Miami Herald described it as "innocuous". Alan Jones from Music Week gave it a score of four out of five, adding, "The Aswad chart-topper is stripped of much of its melody, and given a heavily percussive workover in order to fit the Ace of Base mould. Fans of their sound will heartily approve, and another Top 10 hit seems inevitable." The Network Forty praised the song as "another bonafide smash" and "pure pop". Bob Waliszewski of Plugged In (publication) found that "Don't Turn Around" and "The Sign" "demonstrate strength in the wake of romantic rejection." The Rolling Stone Album Guide described it as "a funky Diane Warren song". Chuck Campbell from Scripps Howard News Service called it a "reggae-paced" number.

=== Chart performance ===
"Don't Turn Around" was a huge hit around the world and remains one of Ace of Base's more successful songs. It reached number one on the RPM Top Singles chart in Canada, and both the US Billboard Adult Contemporary chart and the Cash Box Top 100. In Europe, it made it to the top ten in Austria (8), Denmark (4), Finland (3), Germany (6), Iceland (10), Ireland (8), the Netherlands (7), Scotland (8), and the UK, as well as on the Eurochart Hot 100, where it peaked at number seven in April 1994, in its 13th week on the chart. In the UK, "Don't Turn Around" reached number five in its third week at the UK Singles Chart, on June 19, 1994. Additionally, it was a top-20 hit in Belgium (13), France (17), Sweden (11), and Switzerland (14). Outside Europe, the single also peaked at number two on the RPM Dance/Urban chart, number three in Israel, number four on the US Billboard Hot 100, number eight in New Zealand and number 19 in Australia.

"Don't Turn Around" earned a Gold certification in Germany, New Zealand and the United States with a sales of 250,000, 5,000 and 500,000 singles, respectively.

=== Airplay ===
"Don't Turn Around" entered the European airplay chart Border Breakers at number 20 on April 2, 1994, due to crossover airplay in Central Europe and peaked at number one twice, first on June 4, followed by July 23. Both times it held on to the top spot for two weeks. Together with "The Sign", "Don't Turn Around" monopolised either the number one or two spot on Border Breakers for 36 weeks. On the European Adult Contemporary Radio chart, it peaked at number 10 in May 1994.

=== Impact and legacy ===
"Don't Turn Around" received a nomination in the category for Best Cover at the 1994 MTV Europe Music Awards in Germany, but lost to Gun's cover of "Word Up!".

In 2014, Rolling Stone ranked it number 16 in their "20 Biggest Songs of the Summer: The 1990s" list.

Several reviewers have noted that "Don't Turn Around" might have inspired Lady Gaga for her 2010 hit single "Alejandro". Lindsey Fortier from Billboard magazine compared "Alejandro" to "Don't Turn Around" in her review of Gaga's single. In 2014, when "Don't Turn Around" was ranked number 16 by Idolator in their list of "The 50 Best Pop Singles of 1994", they wrote: "From its spoken-word intro to its insanely catchy pan flute hook, the song encapsulates everything perfect about pop of that era. I can't be the only one who thinks Lady Gaga was inspired by this immortal classic for her own single, "Alejandro," can I?"

In 2019, Billboard magazine ranked it at number 168 in their list of "Billboard's Top Songs of the '90s".

In 2021, BuzzFeed ranked the song number 22 in their list of "The 50 Best '90s Songs of Summer".

=== Music video ===
Ace of Base filmed a music video for the song, directed by Swedish-based director Matt Broadley, showing scenes of a couple leaving each other intertwined with exterior scenes of the band on the beach and interior scenes filmed in a house in Coconut Grove in Miami, Florida, in December 1993. The lighthouse in the video is located in Bill Bags Cape Florida State Park on Key Biscayne, one of Miami's barrier islands. Some parts of the video are in black-and-white, but the scenes with Ace of Base members are in sepia color. The video begins with the group performing inside a sun-soaked red great room in a 1910 era mansion in Coconut Grove. The outdoor scenes were filmed on a beach in key biscayne. The brunette also descends a staircase in the house, that is not on the beach, it is in coconut Grove, and toward the end, all four members walk along the shore. It received heavy rotation on MTV Europe and was A-listed on German music television channel VIVA in May 1994. Three months later, it was A-listed also on France's MCM. Broadley had previously directed the videos for "All That She Wants" and "Happy Nation". "Don't Turn Around" had generated more than 48 million views on YouTube in December 2025.

=== Track listing ===
- UK CD single
1. "Don't Turn Around" (The 7" Aswad Mix)
2. "Don't Turn Around" (Stretch Version)
3. "Young and Proud"
- German 4-track CD
1. "Don't Turn Around" (Radio Groove Mix)
2. "Don't Turn Around" (The Aswad Mix)
3. "Don't Turn Around" (Groove Mix Extended)
4. "Happy Nation" (Moody Gold Mix)
- European 2-CD set

CD 1:

1. "Don't Turn Around"
2. "Don't Turn Around" (Stretch Version)
3. "Young and Proud"

CD 2:

1. "Don't Turn Around" (The 7" Aswad Mix)
2. "Don't Turn Around" (Turned Out Eurodub)
3. "Don't Turn Around" (Groove Mix Extended)
4. "Happy Nation" (Moody Gold Mix)
- Digital download (The Remixes EP, 2009)
1. "Don't Turn Around"
2. "Don't Turn Around" (2009)
3. "Don't Turn Around" (Stretch Version)
4. "Don't Turn Around" (The 7" Aswad Mix)
5. "Don't Turn Around" (Turned Out Eurodub)
6. "Don't Turn Around" (Groove Mix Extended)

=== Credits and personnel ===
- Vocals by Linn Berggren, Jenny Berggren, and Ulf Ekberg
- Backing Vocals by Linn Berggren and Jenny Berggren
- Written by Albert Hammond and Diane Warren
- Produced by Tommy Ekman and Per Adebratt
- Recorded and produced at Tuff Studios, Gothenburg
- Mixed at Park Studios, Stockholm

=== Release history ===
Region	Date	Label
Europe	March 14, 1994	Mega
United States	April 19, 1994	Arista
United Kingdom	May 30, 1994	London
Australia	June 27, 1994	Possum
Japan	July 6, 1994	Arista

=== Charts ===
==== Weekly charts ====
Weekly chart performance for "Don't Turn Around"
Chart (1994)	Peak position
Australia (ARIA)	19
Austria (Ö3 Austria Top 40)	8
Belgium (Ultratop 50 Flanders)	13
Canada Top Singles (RPM)	1
Canada Adult Contemporary (RPM)	5
Canada Dance/Urban (RPM)	2
Denmark (IFPI)	4
Europe (Eurochart Hot 100)	7
Europe (European AC Radio)	10
Europe (European Hit Radio)	8
Finland (Suomen virallinen lista)	3
France (SNEP)	17
Germany (GfK)	6
Iceland (Íslenski Listinn Topp 40)	10
Ireland (IRMA)	8
Israel (Israeli Singles Chart)	3
Mexico (Notitas Musicales)	1
Netherlands (Dutch Top 40)	7
Netherlands (Single Top 100)	7
New Zealand (Recorded Music NZ)	8
Quebec (ADISQ)	2
Scottish Singles Sales (Official Charts)	8
Sweden (Sverigetopplistan)	11
Switzerland (Schweizer Hitparade)	14
UK Singles (Official Charts)	5
UK Airplay (Music Week)	4
US Billboard Hot 100	4
US Adult Contemporary (Billboard)	7
US Maxi-Singles Sales (Billboard)	36
US Pop Airplay (Billboard)	1
US Rhythmic Airplay (Billboard)	6
US Cash Box Top 100	1

2018 weekly chart performance for "Don't Turn Around"
Chart (2018)	Peak position
Poland Airplay (ZPAV)	86

==== Year-end charts ====
1994 year-end chart performance for "Don't Turn Around"
Chart (1994)	Position
Australia (ARIA)	95
Belgium (Ultratop 50 Flanders)	85
Brazil (Mais Tocadas)	43
Canada Top Singles (RPM)	15
Canada Adult Contemporary (RPM)	48
Canada Dance/Urban (RPM)	28
Europe (Eurochart Hot 100)	37
Europe (European Hit Radio)	12
Europe Border Breakers (Music & Media)	2
Germany (Media Control)	39
Iceland (Íslenski Listinn Topp 40)	74
Netherlands (Dutch Top 40)	61
Netherlands (Single Top 100)	97
Sweden (Topplistan)	52
UK Singles (OCC)	63
UK Airplay (Music Week)	24
US Billboard Hot 100	10
US Adult Contemporary (Billboard)	34
US Cash Box Top 100	1

=== Certifications ===
Certifications and sales for "Don't Turn Around"
Region	Certification	Certified units/sales
Germany (BVMI)	Gold	250,000^{^}
New Zealand (RMNZ)	Gold	5,000^{*}
United States (RIAA)	Gold	500,000
^{*} Sales figures based on certification alone.^{^} Shipments figures based on certification alone.

== Other notable cover versions ==
- Soul singer Luther Ingram's version rose to No. 55 on the US Billboard R&B chart in 1987.
- In 1992, Neil Diamond recorded a version of "Don't Turn Around", which made the Top 20 on the US Adult Contemporary chart and Top 10 AC in Canada.
- In 2010, Albert Hammond, co-writer of the song, recorded the song for his album Legend.
