= Living in Danger =

1994 single by Ace of Base

- Single cover

Single by Ace of Base

from the album Happy Nation (U.S. Version)/The Sign
- Released: 4 October 1994
- Genre: Dance; pop; reggae fusion
- Length: 3:10 (single version); 3:39 (album version)
- Label: Arista (US, Japan); Mega (Europe)
- Songwriters: Jonas Berggren; Ulf Ekberg
- Producers: Tommy Ekman; Per Adebratt

Ace of Base singles chronology
| "Don't Turn Around" (1994) | "Living in Danger" (1994) | "Lucky Love" (1995) |

Music video
- "Living in Danger" on YouTube

"Living in Danger" is a song recorded by Swedish group Ace of Base. It was released in October 1994 by Arista and Mega Records as the seventh and final single from the group's debut album, Happy Nation (U.S. version) and fourth single from their American debut release, The Sign (1993). Written by bandmembers Jonas Berggren and Ulf Ekberg, the single peaked at number 20 on the US Billboard Hot 100 and also topped the Billboard Hot Dance Club Play chart in December 1994. On the US Cash Box Top 100, it peaked at number ten. The single later reached number 18 on the UK Singles Chart in January 1995. The accompanying music video was directed by Matt Broadley and filmed in Stockholm, Sweden. Ace of Base performed the song on the first ever MTV Europe Music Awards in Berlin, Germany in 1994. Q Magazine included "Living in Danger" in their list of the "1001 Best Songs Ever" in 2003.

In interviews, Berggren has said the song "is about living on your own" and advising listeners, "Don't trust [people] too much... you'll do better on your own." In contrast, Jenny Berggren has described it as being about social pressure to engage in dangerous behaviors like smoking and drinking.

== Chart performance ==
"Living in Danger" was a sizeable hit on the charts on several continents, although it didn't reach the same level of success as "The Sign" and "Don't Turn Around". In Europe, the song entered the top 20 in Austria (19), Ireland (12), Scotland (19) and the United Kingdom. In the latter, the single peaked at number 18 in its first week at the UK Singles Chart, on January 8, 1995. But on the UK Dance Chart, it was a bigger hit, reaching number 11.

Additionally, "Living in Danger" was a top-30 hit in Belgium (30), Germany (23), the Netherlands (23), Sweden (28) and Switzerland (26), and a top-40 hit in France (36) and Iceland (32), as well as on the Eurochart Hot 100, where it charted at number 34. On MTV's European Top 20, the song reached number six. Outside Europe, the song entered the top 10 in Canada, peaking at number seven on the RPM Top Singles chart and it became a top-five hit in Mexico, peaking at number four. In the US, it became a top-20 hit on the US Billboard Hot 100, peaking at number 20 and a number-one hit on the Billboard Hot Dance Club Play chart. On the US Cash Box Top 100, the song peaked at number ten. In West Asia, "Living in Danger" became a successful top-five hit in Israel, peaking at number three in its third week on the chart, on November 15, 1994.

== Critical reception ==
Upon the single release, Larry Flick from Billboard magazine stated that the Swedish pop phenomenon "shows no sign of loosening its hypnotic hold over top 40 programmers and pop-minded consumers." He added that the song "sticks pretty close to the formula of previous hits: Galloping pop/reggae beats are covered with fluttering synths, a contagious hook, and somewhat disconnected vocal." British columnist James Masterton felt that "Living in Danger" "is typical Ace Of Base, pop-driven dub-reggae yet with a somehow dark, almost gothic feel." John Kilgo from The Network Forty constated that "already stamped as "The Artists of '94", the Swedish quartet strikes again. Showcasing their trademark groove, this number will soar to the top of the charts." In a retrospective review, Annie Zaleski from The A.V. Club noted that the song take influence from "easygoing reggae". Pop Rescue viewed it as "catchy" in their review of Happy Nation, adding that "vocally, it's probably the best track so far".

== Live performances ==
Ace of Base performed "Living in Danger" on the first MTV Europe Music Awards held in Germany in 1994. They performed in the front of Berlin's Brandenburg Gate. The band was also nominated for Best Cover with their previous hit-single "Don't Turn Around" this year.

== Music video ==
The music video for "Living in Danger" was directed by Swedish-based director Matt Broadley and shot in Kungsträdgårdens tunnelbana, an underground metro station in Stockholm, Sweden in September 1994. It was A-listed on French music television channel MCM in December 1994 and the following month, the video received active rotation on MTV Europe and was B-listed on Germany's VIVA. It was later made available on Ace of Base's official YouTube channel in 2015, having generated more than 33 million views as of July 2025. Broadley had previously directed the videos for "All That She Wants", "Happy Nation" and "Don't Turn Around".

=== Synopsis ===
The video of "Living in Danger" opens with the four members of Ace of Base, each of them following one of four people into the underground metro. These are a priest, a war veteran, a female worker of the station and a woman with paranoia. The worker sits in the ticket booth watching the busy people passing by, as if no one really noticed her. On the metro carriage, the paranoid woman looks at the war veteran (who is seen, in flashbacks, during the war being blessed by the priest, who is actually on the same carriage) by the mirror. Then she runs off the train as soon as it reaches the station, scared. In her haste, she falls over behind the ticket office. The station worker helps her up and offers her some coffee. When both men leave the train, the veteran recognizes the priest and the two begin talking, cheerfully. At the end of the video, Joker and Buddha leave the metro station together. Linn and Jenny are standing together on the metro.

One of the people used a Game Boy in the video.

== Track listings ==
- 12" single, UK
1. "Living In Danger" (Old School Mix) — 4:55
2. "Living In Danger" (For The Big Clubs Mix) — 10:15
3. "Living In Danger" (D-House Mix Long Version) — 10:03
4. "Living In Danger" (New Buddha Version) — 3:35
- CD single, UK & Europe
1. "Living In Danger" (Single Edit) — 3:10
2. "Living In Danger" (Old School Mix) (Short Version) — 3:39
3. "Living In Danger" (D-House Mix) (Long Version) — 10:03
4. "Living In Danger" (New Buddha Version) — 3:36
5. "Living In Danger" (For The Big Clubs Mix) — 10:15
- CD maxi, UK
1. "Living in Danger" (Radio Edit) — 3:10
2. "Living in Danger" (Old School Mix Short Version) — 3:39
3. "Living in Danger" (D-House Mix Long Version) — 10:03
4. "Living in Danger" (New Buddha Version) — 3:35
5. "Living in Danger" (For The Big Clubs Mix) — 10:15
- CD maxi, US
1. "Living in Danger" (Radio Remix) — 3:10
2. "Living in Danger" (Album Version) — 3:19
3. "Living in Danger" (Old School Mix) — 4:56
4. "Living in Danger" (D-House Mix) — 10:08
5. "Living in Danger" (Principle Mix) — 8:50
6. "Living in Danger" (Buddha Version) — 3:35

== Personnel ==
- Vocals by Linn Berggren.
- Rap by Ulf Ekberg
- Backing Vocals by Jenny Berggren, John Ballard.
- Written by Jonas Berggren Ulf Ekberg
- Produced by Tommy Ekman and Per Adebratt
- Pre-Production by Jonas Berggren and Ulf Ekberg, T.O.E.C.
- Recorded at Tuff Studios, Gothenburg

== Release history ==
| Region | Date | Label |
|---|---|---|
| United States | 4 October 1994 | Arista |
| Australia | 24 October 1994 | Possum |
| Europe | 31 October 1994 | Mega |
| Japan | 16 December 1994 | Arista |
| United Kingdom | 2 January 1995 | London |

== Charts ==
=== Weekly charts ===
| Chart (1994–1995) | Peak position |
|---|---|
| Australia (ARIA) | 103 |
| Austria (Ö3 Austria Top 40) | 19 |
| Belgium (Ultratop 50 Flanders) | 30 |
| Canada Top Singles (RPM) | 7 |
| Canada Adult Contemporary (RPM) | 28 |
| Europe (Eurochart Hot 100) | 34 |
| Europe (European AC Radio) | 14 |
| Europe (European Dance Radio) | 5 |
| Europe (European Hit Radio) | 9 |
| France (SNEP) | 36 |
| Germany (GfK) | 23 |
| Iceland (Íslenski Listinn Topp 40) | 32 |
| Ireland (IRMA) | 12 |
| Israel (Israeli Singles Chart) | 3 |
| Mexico (Notitas Musicales) | 4 |
| Netherlands (Dutch Top 40) | 27 |
| Netherlands (Single Top 100) | 23 |
| Quebec (ADISQ) | 12 |
| Scotland (OCC) | 19 |
| Sweden (Sverigetopplistan) | 28 |
| Switzerland (Schweizer Hitparade) | 26 |
| UK Singles (OCC) | 18 |
| UK Dance (OCC) | 11 |
| UK Airplay (Music Week) | 7 |
| UK Club Chart (Music Week) | 33 |
| US Billboard Hot 100 | 20 |
| US Hot Adult Contemporary (Billboard) | 35 |
| US Hot Dance Club Play (Billboard) | 1 |
| US Maxi-Singles Sales (Billboard) | 14 |
| US Top 40 Mainstream (Billboard) | 7 |
| US Rhythmic Top 40 (Billboard) | 26 |
| US Cash Box Top 100 | 10 |

=== Year-end charts ===
| Chart (1994) | Position |
|---|---|
| Canada Top Singles (RPM) | 52 |

| Chart (1995) | Position |
|---|---|
| Latvia (Latvijas Top 50) | 207 |
| US Dance Club Play (Billboard) | 11 |
