= Waiting for Magic =

- Single cover

Single by Ace of Base

from the album Happy Nation
- Released: 12 April 1993
- Recorded: 1992
- Genre: Dance-pop; Eurodance; techno
- Length: 5:14 (album version); 3:31 (radio edit)
- Label: Mega
- Songwriters: Buddha; Joker
- Producers: Buddha; Joker

Ace of Base singles chronology
| "Happy Nation" (1992) | "Waiting for Magic" (1993) | "The Sign" (1993) |

Audio
- "Waiting for Magic" on YouTube

"Waiting for Magic" is a song recorded by Swedish pop group Ace of Base from their debut album, Happy Nation (1992). It was released in Scandinavia in April 1993 by Mega Records as the fourth single from the album. The song reached number one in Israel, and the top-10 in both Denmark and Finland. The original version of the song appears only on the original release of Happy Nation. On the album's re-release and The Sign (1993), it was replaced with its remix. No music video was produced for "Waiting for Magic", but it was promoted through a number of live performances, including one at the Miss Universe Denmark pageant.

== Lyrics ==
Snow White is used as an allegory in this song for waiting for "the prince" to come ("Kiss me baby, I am Snow White sleeping in my coffin waiting for you").

== Critical reception ==
In his review, Chuck Eddy from LA Weekly said that the song "is sung by a sleeping beauty waiting "in a coffin" to be kissed and awakened". Kim Såtvedt from Norwegian Laagendalsposten stated that it "has something of the magic" that "All That She Wants" "holds". Pan-European magazine Music & Media wrote, "The Swedish chartbusters drop the conventional reggae beat in favour of a more modern dance cadence. The sing-along factor has remained intact though." Wendi Cermak from The Network Forty described the song as "dance-oriented and radio-friendly". Scandipop called it a "gem" in their retrospective review of Happy Nation. A reviewer from Sputnikmusic noted "an upbeat piano identifying the chord progression that then moves to follow a catchy ascending vocal melody", and concluded that Ace of Base "clearly chose to put some effort into this one."

== Track listing ==
- Sweden Maxi-CD
1. "Waiting for Magic" (Radio Version) – 3:31
2. "Waiting for Magic" (Total Remix 12") – 6:34
3. "Waiting for Magic" (Total Remix 7") – 3:51
4. "Waiting for Magic" (Album Version) – 5:14

== Personnel ==
- Vocals by Linn Berggren, Jenny Berggren, Jonas Berggren, and Ulf Ekberg
- Written by Jonas Berggren and Ulf Ekberg
- Produced by Jonas Berggren and Ulf Ekberg
- Total Remix by Ulf Ekberg and Stonestream
- Recorded at Tuff Studios

== Charts ==
| Chart (1993) | Peak position |
|---|---|
| Denmark (IFPI) | 2 |
| Europe (Eurochart Hot 100) | 84 |
| Finland (Suomen virallinen lista) | 5 |
| Israel (Israeli Singles Chart) | 1 |
| Sweden (Sverigetopplistan) | 19 |
