= The Sign (Ace of Base album) =

1993 studio album by Ace of Base

Studio album (reissue) by Ace of Base
- Released: 23 November 1993
- Recorded: 1991–1993
- Genres: Dance-pop; synth-pop; reggae-pop
- Length: 45:24
- Label: Arista
- Producers: Per Adebratt; Buddha; Douglas Carr; Tommy Ekman; Joker; Denniz Pop; Stonestream; T.O.E.C.

Ace of Base chronology
Happy Nation (1992)	The Sign (1993)	The Bridge (1995)

Singles from The Sign
- 1. "All That She Wants" Released: 24 August 1992; 2. "The Sign" Released: 14 December 1993; 3. "Don't Turn Around" Released: 19 April 1994; 4. "Living in Danger" Released: 4 October 1994

Professional ratings
Review scores
Source	Rating
AllMusic	link
Robert Christgau	(3-star Honorable Mention)
The Encyclopedia of Popular Music	3/5 stars
Los Angeles Times	3/4 stars
People	(favorable)
Pitchfork	8.0/10
The Rolling Stone Album Guide	3.5/5 stars

The Sign is a 1993 album by Swedish pop group Ace of Base, released as the band's debut album in North America, Japan and some Latin American countries by Arista Records. The Sign contains songs from Ace of Base's debut album, Happy Nation (1992) and the new songs "Don't Turn Around", "The Sign", and "Living in Danger" as well as revised versions of "Voulez-Vous Danser" and "Waiting for Magic".

The Sign is listed among the Top 100 Best-selling Albums of All Time by the Recording Industry Association of America (RIAA), with sales in excess of 21 million copies. The album itself earned Arista Records 42 million USD, and was nominated for Best Pop Album at the 1995 Grammy Awards. The Sign was ranked top three on the Billboard 200 chart for 26 consecutive weeks. The album, and the single of the same name, are the only single or album by a Swedish act to rank number one on Billboard's annual overall Year-End lists.

== Background ==
The album was intended to be released in the US on 26 October 1993 as Happy Nation. However, their label, Arista Records, delayed the album in order for the band to add two radio-friendly singles. The two additional tracks were: "The Sign" and "Living in Danger". The album was eventually released on 23 November 1993. To coincide with the release of The Sign, Happy Nation was re-released in Europe, Mexico, and Australia as Happy Nation (U.S. Version). These releases featured the new tracks and revised versions included on The Sign, as well the new track "Hear Me Calling" and a remix of "Happy Nation".

== Commercial performance ==
The Sign is listed among the Top 100 Best-selling Albums of All Time by the Recording Industry Association of America (RIAA), with sales in excess of 21 million copies. The album itself earned Arista Records 42 million USD, and was nominated for Best Pop Album at the 1995 Grammy Awards. The Sign was ranked top three on the Billboard 200 chart for 26 consecutive weeks. In Canada, the album was number one for 13 weeks. The album, and the single of the same name, are the only single or album by a Swedish act to rank number one on Billboard's annual overall Year-End lists.

== Track listing ==
The Sign standard version
No.	Title	Lyrics	Music	Producer(s)	Length
1.	"All That She Wants"	Joker; Buddha^{[a]}	Joker; Buddha	Joker; Buddha; Denniz Pop	3:30
2.	"Don't Turn Around"	Albert Hammond; Diane Warren	Hammond; Warren	Per Adebratt; Tommy Ekman	3:48
3.	"Young and Proud"	Joker; Buddha^{[a]}	Joker; Buddha	Joker; Buddha	3:54
4.	"The Sign"	Joker	Joker	Denniz Pop; Douglas Carr; Joker; Buddha^{[b]}	3:08
5.	"Living in Danger"	Joker; Buddha^{[a]}	Joker; Buddha	Ekman; Adebratt; T.O.E.C.^{[b]}	3:44
6.	"Dancer in a Daydream"	Joker; Buddha^{[a]}	Joker; Buddha	Joker; Buddha	3:39
7.	"Wheel of Fortune"	Joker; Buddha^{[a]}	Joker; Buddha	Joker; Buddha; T.O.E.C.	3:54
8.	"Waiting for Magic" (Total remix 7")	Joker; Buddha^{[a]}	Joker; Buddha	Buddha; Stonestream	3:49
9.	"Happy Nation"	Joker; Buddha^{[a]}	Joker; Buddha	Joker; Buddha	4:13
10.	"Voulez-Vous Danser"	Joker; Buddha^{[a]}	Joker; Buddha	T.O.E.C.; Joker; Buddha	3:21
11.	"My Mind" (Mindless mix)	Joker; Buddha^{[a]}	Joker; Buddha	Joker; Buddha	4:10
12.	"All That She Wants" (Banghra version)	Joker; Buddha^{[a]}	Joker; Buddha	Joker; Buddha; Denniz Pop	4:14

The Sign remastered version bonus track
No.	Title	Length
13.	"Mr. Ace" (demo 1991)	3:21

Notes

- ^{^[a]} signifies rap lyrics
- ^{^[b]} signifies pre-production

== Charts ==
=== Weekly charts ===
Weekly chart performance for The Sign
Chart (1993–1994)	Peak position
Argentine Albums (CAPIF)	1
Canada Top Albums/CDs (RPM)	1
Japanese Albums (Oricon)	3
US Billboard 200	1

=== Year-end charts ===
1994 year-end chart performance for The Sign
Chart (1994)	Position
Canada Top Albums/CDs (RPM)	1
US Billboard 200	1

1995 year-end chart performance for The Sign
Chart (1995)	Position
Canada Top Albums/CDs (RPM)	19
US Billboard 200	47

== Certifications and sales ==
Certifications and sales for The Sign
Region	Certification	Certified units/sales
Argentina	—	300,000
Brazil (Pro-Música Brasil)	Gold	200,000
Canada (Music Canada)	Diamond	1,000,000^{^}
Chile	—	60,000
Denmark (IFPI Danmark)	Gold	10,000^{‡}
Japan	—	800,000
Mexico	—	300,000
South Korea	—	500,000
United States (RIAA)	9× Platinum	10,000,000
Summaries
Scandinavia	—	900,000
^{^} Shipments figures based on certification alone.^{‡} Sales+streaming figures based on certification alone.

The Sign

Video by Ace of Base
- Released: 1994
- Genre: pop

== Video album ==
Some songs from the album were also released as an Ace of Base video collection released in the summer of 1994 on VHS video in North America. Laserdisc editions appeared in Japan as well.

=== Contents ===
1. "All That She Wants"
2. "The Sign"
3. "Don't Turn Around" Studio Documentary
4. "Don't Turn Around"
5. "Living in Danger" Studio Documentary
6. "Happy Nation"
7. "Wheel of Fortune"
