= Matt Broadley =

Swedish director

- Occupations: music video director TV commercial director director of photography
- Years active: 1990s-present

Matt Broadley is a Swedish director. He has made music videos for several songs that went #1 on the charts, like "All That She Wants" and "Mr. Vain".

== Career ==
Broadley has directed many TV commercials and music videos. His clients include:

- Aldaris
- Arla
- Caroli
- C MORE
- Disney Channel
- Energizer
- Kanal 5
- Oriflame
- SVT1
- SVT2
- TV3 Sweden
- TV4 Sweden
- TV6
- TV12
- TV1000
- V75
- Viasat

His music videos include videos for artists such as:

- Ace of Base
- All Blue
- B.G., the Prince of Rap
- Beverley Knight
- Culture Beat
- "Demons"
- Dr Alban
- Dune
- E-Type
- Gina G
- Herbie
- Inner Circle
- Jam & Spoon
- Jamie Cullum
- Joaquin Cortes
- Leila K
- Magic Affair
- Mark 'Oh
- Masterboy
- MC Sar & The Real McCoy
- M People
- Stella Getz
- The Cardigans

== Videography ==
- Ace of Base - "All That She Wants"
- Ace of Base - "Don't Turn Around"
- Ace of Base - "Happy Nation"
- Ace of Base - "Living In Danger"
- Ace of Base - "Lucky Love"
- Al Agami - "Deep Undercover"
- B.G., the Prince of Rap - "The Colour of My Dreams"
- Beagle - "Nine Out Of Ten"
- Beagle - "When I Speak Your Name"
- Beverley Knight - "Made It Back"
- Cod Lovers - "In Limbo"
- Culture Beat - "Anything"
- Culture Beat - "Got to Get It"
- Culture Beat - "Mr. Vain"
- Culture Beat - "World in Your Hands"
- Deep Fried - "Chanel Girl"
- Deep Fried - "Trust My love"
- Deep Fried & Rankin’ Roger - "Mirror In The Bathroom"
- Dr Alban - "Look Who’s Talking!"
- Dune - "Hand In Hand"
- Dune - "Who Wants To Live Forever"
- Electric Boys - "Do You Believe In Me"
- E-Type - "Euro 2000"
- E-Type - "Russian Lullaby"
- E-Type - "This Is The Way"
- Gina G - "Ti Amo"
- Herbie- "I Believe"
- Herbie - "Right Type of Mood"
- Inner Circle - "Rock With You"
- Inner Circle - "Wrapped Up In Your Love"
- Intermission - "Everlasting Love"
- Jam & Spoon - "Right in the Night"
- Jamie Cullum - "These are the Days"
- Joaquin Cortes - "Al Nagilasa"
- Leila K - "Open Sesame"
- Magic Affair - "Energy Of Light"
- Mark 'Oh - "Tears Don't Lie"
- Masterboy- "Mr Feeling"
- MC Sar & The Real McCoy - "Runaway"
- M People - "Fantasy Island"
- Rednex - "Wish You Were Here"
- Silje - "Tell Me Where You’re Going"
- Silje - "Fall"
- Stella Getz - "Friends"
- Stevie V - "Stevie V"
- Søs Fenger - "You Let Me Down"
- The Cardigans - "Carnival"
- The Passengers - "7 Days 7 Nights"
- The Sinners - "Love You More Than This"
- Treble & Bass - "My Sweet Señorita"
- Treble & Bass - "Swing"
- Ultra - "Say It Once"
- Verena - "Finally Alone"
