= All in All =

All in All may refer to:

- "all in all", eschatological phrase from 1 Corinthians 15:28
- All In All 2015, compilation of the first three EPs of Bob Moses
- "All in All", song by Chris Tomlin from Always
- "All in All", single by Stella Getz
- "All in All", song by Shania Twain from Now
