= Happy Nation (song) =

1992 single by Ace of Base

- One of Scandinavian variants of 1993 European artwork

Single by Ace of Base

from the album Happy Nation
- Released: 7 December 1992
- Studio: Tuff
- Genre: Dance-pop; reggae fusion
- Length: 4:16
- Label: Mega
- Songwriters: Jonas Berggren; Ulf Ekberg
- Producers: Jonas Berggren; Ulf Ekberg

Ace of Base singles chronology
"All That She Wants" (1992)	"Happy Nation" (1992)	"Waiting for Magic" (1993)

Music video
- "Happy Nation" on YouTube "Happy Nation (Moody Gold Remix)" on YouTube

"Happy Nation" is a song recorded by Swedish group Ace of Base from their debut album with the same name (1992). It was first released in Scandinavia in December 1992 by Mega Records and later released twice in the UK. The first appearance was in October 1993, when it peaked at number 42, it re-entered the chart twelve months later at number 40. "Happy Nation" reached number-one on the singles charts of Denmark, Finland, France and Israel in 1993 and 1994. Its music video was directed by Matt Broadley. In 2008, the song was remade by Ace of Base for a remix kit.

"Happy Nation" is a mid-tempo dance-pop song with strong influences from reggae fusion and Eurohouse. It was written by group members Jonas "Joker" Berggren and Ulf "Buddha" Ekberg and contains both English and Latin lyrics. The first verse is sung in Latin by Joker, and Linn Berggren sings the rest as the lead singer. The band has described the song, written as a response to reports of Ekberg's past associations with neo-Nazi skinheads, as an "anti-fascist song and a hymn to life". Ekberg has also said the song is a response to "everybody talking about how bad everything is! ... I think [the] best thing is to see [the] positive."

== Lyrics ==
The first verse of Happy Nation is in Latin. The words literally translate to "Praise all nations, praise // magnifies for ever // and my soul praises // magnifies for ever". The intended interpretation of the verse, inspired by Psalm 117, is "Praise all people and nations, praise // Magnify in the centuries // and praise my spirit // Glorify throughout the ages".

== Critical reception ==
AllMusic editor Jose F. Promis complimented the song as "maravilhosa". In a retrospective review, Annie Zaleski of American online newspaper The A.V. Club noted that it takes influence from "taut techno". Fort Worth Examiner remarked that it "provides a positive mindset for how we should relate to and live with one another." Swedish Göteborgsposten stated that the reggae-rhythms from "All That She Wants" also "shows up" in the song, but "most of the sound is taken from European synth-based music." Chuck Eddy from LA Weekly named it "the record's saddest-sounding song". Andrew Balkin from Kingston Informer noted that "the Aces go downbeat" on "Happy Nation" and "Wheel of Fortune", adding further that both songs "have a soul/dance feel about them and wouldn't be out of place on the dance floor, or setting the mood in a smoky club." In another article, the newspaper described it as "a luvvly bubbly song". In his weekly UK chart commentary, James Masterton viewed it as "another piece of darkly brilliant dub reggae". Mario Tarradell from Miami Herald stated, "Just try to shake the irresistible hook of "All That She Wants" and "Happy Nation": you won't succeed."

When the single was released for the second time in the UK, Alan Jones from Music Week rated it three out of five, deeming it as a "fairly unambitious regga plod" that "will inevitably do better this time around, but it will still be one of their smaller hits." A reviewer from People Magazine felt that the tune "prove Ace of Base to be more substantive than a mere ABBA clone." Bob Waliszewski of Plugged In (publication) remarked that it "promotes brotherhood". James Hamilton from the Record Mirror Dance Update viewed it as a "rumbling Boney M-ish 0–95.9bpm lurcher". Chuck Campbell from Scripps Howard News Service called it a "reggae-paced" number. Sylvia Patterson from Smash Hits gave it two out of five. She added, "Much moodier than the unfeasibly catchy "All That She Wants" thing, thank goodness, this is sort of like R.E.M.'s "Shiny Happy People" if it was by The Beloved, if you see what I mean. A pan-global religo-spook reverie with warbly Indian bits on and some whistling." Edna Gundersen from USA Today complimented it as a "cheery tune". The Vindicator stated that "the blend of melody and rhythm" in a song like "Happy Nation" "is all but irresistible".

== Chart performance ==
"Happy Nation" reached number one in Denmark, Finland, and France. It peaked within the top five in Lithuania, the Netherlands and in the group's native Sweden, where it hit number four and stayed within the Sverigetopplistan for a total of eight weeks. Additionally, the single was a top-10 hit in Austria, Belgium (Flanders), Germany and Norway. In Iceland, it entered the top 20, peaking at number 14, while in Italy and Switzerland, it was a top-30 hit. In the UK, it reached the top 40 during its second run on the UK Singles Chart, peaking at number 40 on 9 October 1994. On the Eurochart Hot 100, which was based on national singles sales charts in 17 European countries, "Happy Nation" peaked at number 19 in September 1993. It had made its debut on the chart nine months earlier, at number 94, at the beginning of January 1993, after charting in Denmark. Elsewhere, the single peaked at number one in Israel, holding that position for three weeks from 2 March 1993. In Oceania, it reached numbers 22 and 80 in New Zealand and Australia, respectively. "Happy Nation" was awarded with a gold record in Germany with 250,000 singles sold and a silver record in France, after 125,000 units were sold.

== Music video ==
The accompanying music video of "Happy Nation" was directed by Swedish-based director Matt Broadley, who had previously directed the video of "All That She Wants". It was shot in Gothenburg, Sweden, in January 1993.

=== Synopsis ===
The video begins with a lit candle, the flame of which blowing to the side. During Joker's verse, he sings flanked on both sides by a candelabrum, with Linn's face and different ancient symbols and pictures moving in the background. These images include the peace symbol, runic inscriptions, Egyptian hieroglyphs, Indigenous Australian art, the Buddha, the Zodiac signs, the yin yang symbol, the Crucifixion of Jesus, Holy Trinity, Al-Fatiha, and the book The Origin of Species by Charles Darwin. After Joker's verse, the rest of the video focuses on Linn singing. She is mostly seen standing, but at one point she is seen sitting at a long wooden table, appearing to be deep in thought. At other times, Jenny Berggren appears singing with Linn for a moment, even though, like in "All That She Wants", she didn't provide any vocals for this song. The background images continue to appear during this part, along with scenes of Buddha typing on a stationary computer, Jenny reading from an old book, Joker singing the background vocals, and other short clips featuring the band members. Old movie footage is also shown during Linn's section, such as, notably, an atomic bomb exploding when the lyrics "tell them we've gone too far" are sung, people walking, and deforestation. When the music fades out, the lit candle shown at the start of the video is blown out.

== Track listings ==
- 7-inch single
1. "Happy Nation" (radio edit) – 3:32
2. "Happy Nation" (album version) – 4:11
- CD single – UK
1. "Happy Nation" (radio edit) – 3:32
2. "Happy Nation" (12-inch version) – 6:39
3. "Happy Nation" (album version) – 4:11
- CD maxi
1. "Happy Nation" (Gold Zone club mix)
2. "Happy Nation" (Gold Zone 7-inch edit)
3. "Happy Nation" (Gold dub edit)
4. "Happy Nation" (Moody Gold mix)

== Personnel ==
- Vocals by Linn Berggren
- Latin Choir by Jonas Berggren
- Backing Vocals by John Ballard
- Written by Jonas Berggren and Ulf Ekberg
- Produced by Jonas Berggren and Ulf Ekberg
- Recorded at Tuff Studios

== Charts ==
=== Weekly charts ===
Chart (1993–1994)	Peak position
Australia (ARIA)	80
Austria (Ö3 Austria Top 40)	6
Belgium (Ultratop 50 Flanders)	8
Denmark (IFPI)	1
Europe (Eurochart Hot 100)	19
Finland (Suomen virallinen lista)	1
France (SNEP)	1
Germany (GfK)	7
Iceland (Íslenski Listinn Topp 40)	14
Israel (Israeli Singles Chart)	1
Italy (Musica e dischi)	21
Lithuania (M-1)	3
Netherlands (Dutch Top 40)	5
Netherlands (Single Top 100)	6
Norway (VG-lista)	6
New Zealand (Recorded Music NZ)	22
Scottish Singles Sales (Official Charts)	37
Sweden (Sverigetopplistan)	4
Switzerland (Schweizer Hitparade)	23
UK Singles (OCC)	40
UK Airplay (Media Monitor)	43
UK Club Chart (Music Week)	94

=== Year-end charts ===
Chart (1993)	Position
Belgium (Ultratop Flanders)	72
Europe (Eurochart Hot 100)	67
Germany (Media Control)	42
Israel (Israeli Singles Chart)	20
Netherlands (Dutch Top 40)	63
Netherlands (Single Top 100)	79
Sweden (Topplistan)	53

Chart (1994)	Position
France (SNEP)	16

== Certifications ==
Region	Certification	Certified units/sales
France (SNEP)	Silver	125,000^{*}
Germany (BVMI)	Gold	250,000^{^}
^{*} Sales figures based on certification alone.^{^} Shipments figures based on certification alone.

== Release history ==
Region	Date	Label
Denmark	7 December 1992	Mega
United Kingdom	1 November 1993	London
Australia	10 January 1994	Possum
United Kingdom (re-issue)	3 October 1994	London

== Other recordings ==
During the 6th series of Så mycket bättre in 2015, Niklas Strömstedt performed the song in Swedish as "Lyckolandet", with lyrics against racism and xenophobia.

== In other media ==
=== Television ===
The song was used in the X-Men '97 episode "Remember It", played during the Hellfire Gala that directly preceded genocide on the island of Genosha. Many fans liken it to the "Rains of Castamere" from Game of Thrones which preceded the infamous Red Wedding, giving the song a new context for X-Men fans.

== Legacy ==
The song experienced a resurgence in 2024 and 2025 through the short-form video hosting service TikTok.
