= Right Type of Mood =

1995 single by Herbie

Single by Herbie

from the album Fingers
- Released: 6 March 1995
- Genre: Eurodance; ragga; jungle
- Length: 3:12
- Label: Cheiron; BMG
- Songwriters: Herbie Crichlow; Max Martin
- Producers: Denniz PoP; Max Martin

Herbie singles chronology
"Right Type of Mood" (1995)	"I Believe" (1995)

Music video
- "Right Type of Mood" on YouTube

"Right Type of Mood" is a song by English producer and songwriter Herbie, released in March 1995 as the lead single from his debut album, Fingers (1995). It was co-written by Herbie with Max Martin, and produced by Denniz PoP and Martin. The song received various successes globally on both the commercial pop and R&B charts and was supported by a partially computer generated music video, directed by Matt Broadley. The single reached number three in Sweden, number-one on the Canadian and Swedish dance music charts, and number ten in Australia and the Netherlands. In addition, it was a top-20 hit in Denmark and Finland. The song is a collaboration of synthetic drums and pads layered over striving constant and uplifting stabs and atmospheric arrangements. It was also nominated to the Swedish Dance Music Awards in 1996 for Best Swedish Dance Track.

== Critical reception ==
James Hamilton from Music Week's RM Dance Update described "Right Type of Mood" as a "Herbie Chrichlow ragga rapped catchy 'Mister Magoo' shouting jaunty Swedish galloper". Mark Frith from Smash Hits gave the single a score of four out of five, writing, "Produced by the same person behind Ace of Base and Dr Alban, this sounds more like 2 Unlimited with a ferocious rapper. It's got elements of jungle and ragga but no one is probably going to take him seriously as a rapper 'cos he's based in Sweden. Shame, because it's good stuff."

== Music video ==
The accompanying music video for "Right Type of Mood" was shot in black-and-white and directed by Swedish-based director Matt Broadley. The partially computer generated video was filmed in a Stockholm Metro train. Mark Frith of Smash Hits wrote about the video, "If you haven't seen the video for this yet, you're missing out. Herbie is trapped on a train hurtling through the underground Speed-style. But that doesn't bother our rapping hero. He straps on his scary shades, climbs all over the furniture and sings away merrily." "Right Type of Mood" was B-listed on German music television channel VIVA in April 1995.

== Charts ==
=== Weekly charts ===
Chart (1995)	Peak position
Australia (ARIA)	10
Belgium (Ultratop 50 Flanders)	31
Canada Dance/Urban (RPM)	1
Denmark (IFPI)	17
Europe (Eurochart Hot 100)	48
Europe (European Dance Radio)	8
Finland (Suomen virallinen lista)	17
Germany (GfK)	31
Netherlands (Dutch Top 40)	12
Netherlands (Single Top 100)	10
Sweden (Sverigetopplistan)	3
Sweden Dance (Swedish Dance Chart)	1
UK Pop Tip Club Chart (Music Week)	4

=== Year-end charts ===
Chart (1995)	Position
Australia (ARIA)	43
Canada Dance/Urban (RPM)	8
Netherlands (Dutch Top 40)	116
Sweden (Topplistan)	49

== Certifications ==
Region	Certification	Certified units/sales
Australia (ARIA)	Gold	35,000^{^}
^{^} Shipments figures based on certification alone.
