= Can We Get Enough? =

Single by B.G., the Prince of Rap

from the album The Time Is Now
- B-side: "Remix"
- Released: 1993
- Studio: Allstar Warehouse
- Genre: Eurodance
- Length: 4:00
- Label: Dance Pool
- Songwriters: Jam El Mar; B.G., the Prince of Rap; Stefan Benz
- Producer: Jam El Mar

B.G., the Prince of Rap singles chronology
"The Power of Rhythm" (1992)	"Can We Get Enough?" (1993)	"The Colour of My Dreams" (1994)

Music video
- "Can We Get Enough?" on YouTube

"Can We Get Enough?" is a song recorded by American German-based Eurodance artist B.G., the Prince of Rap, released in 1993 by Dance Pool as the first single from his second album, The Time Is Now (1994). It was co-written by him with the producer of the song, Jam El Mar, and Stefan Benz, and is one of his most successful songs alongside "The Colour of My Dreams". In Europe, "Can We Get Enough?" peaked at number six in Italy, and was a top-30 hit in Sweden and a top-40 hit in Germany. On the Eurochart Hot 100, the single reached number 66 in August 1993. Elsewhere, it was a top-10 hit on the Canadian RPM Dance/Urban chart, as well as a top-20 hit in Israel.

== Critical reception ==
Pan-European magazine Music & Media wrote, "This artist has established considerable credibility as one of the prime exponents of the German dance movement. A year's absence from the scene has caused no harm either, as witnessed by this fast-paced techno-rap with ambient overtones."

== Track listing ==
- 12", Germany (1993)
1. "Can We Get Enough?" — 5:53
2. "Can We Get Enough?" (Fonky Mix) — 6:23
- CD maxi, Germany (1993)
1. "Can We Get Enough?" (Media Edit) — 4:00
2. "Can We Get Enough?" — 5:53
3. "Can We Get Enough?" (Fonky Mix) — 6:23
4. "Can We Get Enough?" (Fonky Edit) — 4:17
- CD maxi (Remix), Germany (1993)
1. "Can We Get Enough?" (Remix) — 6:31
2. "Can We Get Enough?" (Meta Force Mixx) (Rap Louder) — 13:05
3. "Can We Get Enough?" (Artwork Mix) — 5:46

== Charts ==
Chart (1993)	Peak position
Europe (Eurochart Hot 100)	66
Canada Dance/Urban (RPM)	8
Germany (GfK)	34
Israel (Israeli Singles Chart)	18
Italy (Musica e Dischi)	7
Sweden (Sverigetopplistan)	28
