= The Sign (song) =

1993 single by Ace of Base

- European cover art. The North American cover art is a still from the music video (not pictured).

Single by Ace of Base

from the album The Sign / Happy Nation (U.S. Version)
- B-side: "Young and Proud"
- Released: 1 November 1993
- Studio: Cheiron (Stockholm, Sweden)
- Genre: Techno-reggae; Europop; pop
- Length: 3:08
- Label: Arista; Mega
- Songwriter: Jonas Berggren
- Producers: Berggren; Denniz Pop; Douglas Carr

Ace of Base singles chronology
"Waiting for Magic" (1993)	"The Sign" (1993)	"Don't Turn Around" (1994)

Music video
- "The Sign" on YouTube

"The Sign" is a song by Swedish group Ace of Base from their first North American studio album, The Sign (1993), and their re-released debut studio album, Happy Nation (1992), titled Happy Nation (U.S. Version). The song was released by Arista and Mega Records as a single in Europe on 1 November 1993 and the US on 14 December 1993. It was written by band member Jonas Berggren, who also produced the song with Denniz Pop and Douglas Carr. "The Sign" is a techno-reggae, Europop, and pop ballad with lyrics describing a couple contemplating the state of their relationship.

"The Sign" topped the Billboard Hot 100 for six non-consecutive weeks in the United States, which allowed Ace of Base to become the first Swedish group to simultaneously have a number one song and album on the Hot 100 and Billboard 200 respectively. Consequently, the song was ranked as the number one song of 1994 on Billboard's year-end chart. It also reached number one in 14 countries such as Australia, Canada, Germany, and New Zealand, and peaked at number two on the UK Singles Chart. Its accompanying music video, directed by Mathias Julien and filmed in Stockholm, Sweden, received a nomination at the 1994 Billboard Music Video Awards. "The Sign" was nominated for Grammy Award for Best Pop Performance by a Duo or Group with Vocals at the 37th Annual Grammy Awards. In 2023, Billboard magazine ranked it among the 500 best pop songs of all time.

== Background and development ==
Ace of Base were originally signed to the Danish independent label Mega Records, which released their debut album Happy Nation in 1992. The original album did not include "The Sign". In October 1992, Music & Media identified Maurice Hawkesworth as Mega Records' A&R manager, described Ace of Base as signed to the label, and named Denniz Pop as a co-producer of the group's Danish number-one single "All That She Wants".

Pop and Douglas Carr had also produced Leila K's 1992 single "Open Sesame", another Mega Records production. In March 1993, Music & Media reported that Happy Nation was double-platinum in Denmark, with sales of 160,000 copies. On 31 July 1993, the magazine reported that the album had sold over one million copies, that Mega had already licensed the group to Metronome/PolyGram outside Scandinavia in Europe, and that the label had recently concluded an agreement with Arista Records for the Americas and Japan. The report again identified Hawkesworth as a Mega A&R/artist liaison. In a January 1994 Music Connection interview, Arista vice president of A&R Richard Sweret said that he had already been aware of Ace of Base before hearing "All That She Wants" on European radio and described the company's arrangements as a cooperative venture.

A March 2019 Recording Academy retrospective stated that Arista president Clive Davis received a demo of "The Sign" and passed it to Pop and Carr for further production. In the same article, Jonas Berggren was quoted as saying that Pop had been the first person to hear his rough instrumental demo of the song. The retrospective did not specify the dates of these exchanges. The band's official website also recounts the Davis demo handoff. The demo only contained the song's instrumental, so Pop thought that the verse was the chorus. In contrast to their 1992 single "All That She Wants", Pop knew what he wanted to do with the song from the beginning.

"The Sign" was recorded at Cheiron Studios in Stockholm, Sweden. According to the band's official account, Malin (Linn) Berggren and Jenny Berggren rearranged the song into a duet, while Jenny changed chords at the ending and composed its harmonies. The same website lists Jonas Berggren alone under "Writer". In an interview with Idolator, Jonas Berggren stated that Jenny and Linn split the chorus into two parts, with the former singing the second and fourth parts. He acknowledged that it "was hard to sing" since there was no breathing time. The song was recorded at a loud volume, which caused the producers Pop, Douglas Carr, and Jonas Berggren, to lower the sound by three decibels during audio mastering.

== Composition ==
"The Sign" is a techno-reggae, Europop, and pop ballad. The song's lyrics describe a couple contemplating the state of their relationship and deciding to split up as a result. During recording, Jonas Berggren added hums between the melody lines to become "major and minor" with the chorus being "mostly major", as he believed that the song was originally "too merry". He added that the lyrics are "about thinking back on an old [relationship]", but are deliberately oblique to allow listeners to form their own meanings. The ending includes the words "I am happy now living without you / I've left you". Jenny Berggren compared the lyrics to the "road of life" metaphor, noting, "You see signs in your life, and that's why you change direction."

"The Sign" is performed in the key of G major for the verses and chorus but in G minor for the intro and instrumental breaks. It follows a tempo of 97 beats per minute in common time. According to the sheet music published at Musicnotes.com by Universal Music Publishing Group, the group's vocals span from the low note of A_{3} to the high note of E_{5}. The song initially begins with the sounds of a hand clap, kick drum, and snare over a four bar beat, which was sampled from "Shack Up" by American funk group Banbarra. The melodic hook contains a synth flute from E-Mu Vintage Keys synth module, with a bass combining a Moog sub-bass and a Korg M1 bass. Throughout the verses, a Yamaha TG77 synthesizer is used to create a reggae rhythm guitar sound. During the bridge, the band's vocal range increases by an octave.

== Chart performance ==
In Europe, "The Sign" reached number one in Denmark (4 weeks), Finland (4 weeks), Germany (3 weeks), and Spain (1 week). Additionally, the song was a top-10 hit also in Austria (3), Belgium (5), France (5), Ireland (2), Italy (9), Lithuania (2), the Netherlands (3), Norway (5), Scotland (2), Sweden (2), Switzerland (4), and the United Kingdom (2). In the latter, it peaked in its second week at UK Singles Chart on 27 February 1994. It was held off reaching the top spot by Mariah Carey's "Without You" (1994), and spent a total of three weeks as number two on the chart and 16 weeks within the UK Top 100. On 28 November, it entered the Eurochart Hot 100 at number 29 and peaked at number two eight weeks later.

Outside Europe, "The Sign" peaked at number one in Australia (4 weeks), Israel (2 weeks), New Zealand (5 weeks), Canada (5 weeks), and Zimbabwe (2 weeks). In the United States, the song topped the Billboard Hot 100 on the chart dated 12 March 1994. This allowed Ace of Base to become the first Swedish group to simultaneously score a number one single and album on the Billboard charts. "The Sign" also topped the US Cash Box Top 100. It was the number one song of 1994 according to Billboard magazine's year-end charts. The song was ranked at number 60 on "The Billboard Hot 100 All-Time Top Songs" for the first 55 years of the Hot 100 chart, and received a nomination for Grammy Award for Best Pop Performance by a Duo or Group with Vocals at the 1995 Grammy Awards.

In 1994, Music & Media published an assessment of the chart performance of "The Sign", which stated that it "entered Border Breakers at number ten on November 21, 1993, due to crossover airplay in Central Europe. It also peaked twice at number one; on December 18, staying for five weeks and again on March 9 for a two week stay. It entered the Eurochart November 28 at 29 and peaked at two eight weeks later", and that it "[...] also holds the record for longest-running single on Border Breakers—42 weeks before slipping off on August 20."

== Critical reception ==
AllMusic editor Stephen Thomas Erlewine stated that the success of singles such as "The Sign" was attributed to "relentless" beats and an "incessantly catchy" hook. Howard Cohen from Herald-Journal noted that it is flavoured with "faux reggae rhythms". Chuck Campbell from Scripps Howard News Service claimed that "The Sign" "could be a bigger hit" than "All That She Wants", due to its "infectious Europop energy and cosmic synths set to a reggae beat". Writing for the Dance Update column of Music Week, James Hamilton described it as a "US smash typical 96.7bpm cod-reggae jogger". Jim Farber from New York Daily News compared the song's "dinky synths, impish dance beats and miniaturized vocals" to musicians from the 1980s such as A Flock of Seagulls and Falco. Neil Strauss from The New York Times wrote that Ace of Base used "a deceptively mystical hook over a minimal bass line" to create the song. A reviewer from People acknowledged that tunes like "The Sign" "prove Ace of Base to be more substantive than a mere ABBA clone." Press-Telegram stated that it is "packed with unforgettable hooks". The Rolling Stone Album Guide compared "The Sign" to Gloria Gaynor's 1978 song "I Will Survive", writing that it was "the wisest, catchiest, most triumphant kiss-off".

Chuck Eddy of LA Weekly labeled the music video as "fun", but described "The Sign" as undistinctive. Mario Tarradell from Miami Herald opined that the song was "annoyingly chirpy". Alan Jones from Music Week wrote that Ace of Base's attempts to imitate "All That She Wants" by using a "shuffling reggae beat" was "less charming and effective", but believed "The Sign" was "bright enough" to chart in the top 20 on the UK Singles Chart. Tom Doyle from Smash Hits gave "The Sign" two out of five in his review, stating that the reggae beat, saxophone, and tune were similar to "All That She Wants". Writing for Entertainment Weekly, David Thigpen described it as "a wasteland of neutered hip-hop and lumbering dance rhythms", criticizing Linn Berggren's vocals as "inert" and "colorless". Barry Walters for the San Francisco Examiner stated that the song "blankly chirps".

== Legacy ==
In his retrospective review of the band's 1993 studio album The Sign, Eric Torres from Pitchfork named "The Sign" an "undeniable pop bauble that combines all the group’s best impulses—bobbing rhythm, eccentric production tics, lovably inane lyrics". Amos Barshad of Vulture stated that it "is still a very good pop song" despite being outdated in production techniques, stating that it sounded analog. American singer Katy Perry acknowledged in a 2009 MTV News interview that the song, along with the Cardigans' 1996 song "Lovefool", served as an inspiration for her recordings. John Seabrook, a staff writer at The New Yorker, praised the song in his 2015 book The Song Machine: Inside the Hit Factory, stating that "the song is a three-minute, thirty-second sonic thrill rise of Swedish funk." He also acknowledged that the song's success was due to three people: Denniz Pop, Clive Davis, and Clive Calder. Seabrook concluded that it had an influential impact on pop music, suggesting that "a Swedish hit factory for US and British artists had never happened before. ... 'The Sign' really was the sign that that could happen". Annie Zaleski from The A.V. Club wrote that the song "is full of cheerful shade", noting that it combined a "breezy reggae vibe" with 1990s Europop. Bob Waliszewski of Plugged In (publication) noted that the song's lyrics "demonstrate[s] strength in the wake of romantic rejection".

Idolator ranked "The Sign" at number one on their ranking of The 50 Best Pop Singles of 1994, with author Robbie Daw writing that it "was a straight-up smash that was tailor made for radio". Rolling Stone placed the song at number 42 on their list of 50 Best Songs of the Nineties, while BuzzFeed listed the song at number 28 on their 2017 list of The 101 Greatest Dance Songs Of the '90s. Billboard magazine ranked "The Sign" at number 65 on their 2018 ranking of All-Time Top 100 Songs, stating in a separate article that it "led pop into a new era, putting Sweden on the map as a credible hitmaking hub, pushing electronic production closer to the forefront of popular music and helping ignite a collaborative approach to songwriting that has become an industry standard". In October 2023, Billboard ranked it number 223 in their 500 Best Pop Songs of All Time list, saying, "Sitting somewhere between Europop, techno and reggae pop, Ace of Base's monster smash remains a quintessential staple of ‘90s playlists."

== Cover versions and usage in media ==
In 1995, a cover of "The Sign" was featured in the American sitcom Full House in the final season episode "We Got the Beat". In the episode, Jodie Sweetin in character as Stephanie Tanner performs the song with her fictional band Girl Talk. It was later brought back in the spin-off Fuller House. In 2010, "The Sign" was heavily featured in the season 6 American Dad episode "Great Space Roaster". The song was sung by fictional a cappella group the Barden Bellas in the 2012 film Pitch Perfect and appears on the soundtrack for the movie. The song was used as part of a commercial advertising campaign for Uncle Ben's in 2016.

Indie rock band The Mountain Goats included a cover of "The Sign" by Ace of Base on their 1995 EP Songs For Peter Hughes. The group has continued to play versions of it at live shows.

== Accolades ==
Year	Publisher	Country	Accolade	Rank	Ref.
1994	Billboard Music Video Awards	United States	"Best New Pop/AC Artist Clip of the Year"	nomination	
1995	Grammy Awards	United States	"Best Pop Performance by a Duo or Group with Vocals"	nomination	
1995	BMI	United States	"BMI Pop Awards"	*	
2005	Bruce Pollock	United States	"The 7,500 Most Important Songs of 1944–2000"	*	
2012	Porcys	Poland	"100 Singli 1990–1999"	55	
2013	Billboard	United States	"Hot 100 55th Anniversary: The All-Time 100 Biggest Songs"	59	
2014	Idolator	United States	"The 50 Best Pop Singles of 1994"	1	
2015	OCC	United Kingdom	"Pop Gem"	1	
2016	Rolling Stone	United States	"50 Best Songs of the Nineties"	42	
2017	BuzzFeed	United States	"The 101 Greatest Dance Songs of the '90s"	28	
2018	Billboard	United States	"All-Time Top 100 Songs"	65	
2019	Insider	United States	"Best Songs from the '90s"	*	
2019	Max	Australia	"1000 Greatest Songs of All Time"	688	
2019	Stacker	United States	"Best 90s Pop Songs"	12	
2019	Billboard	United States	"Billboard's Top Songs of the '90s"	14	
2020	Cleveland.com	United States	"Best Billboard Hot 100 No. 1 Song of the 1990s"	54	
2020	Glamour	United States	"53 Best '90s Songs That Are All That and a Bag of Chips"	48	
2021	BuzzFeed	United States	"The 50 Best '90s Songs of Summer"	7	
2021	Time Out	United Kingdom	"50 Best '90s Songs"	48	
2022	Pitchfork	United States	"The 250 Best Songs of the 1990s"	169	
2023	Billboard	United States	"500 Best Pop Songs of All Time"	223	
2024	Cosmopolitan	United States	"60 of the Best '90s Songs for the Ultimate Throwback Playlist"	50	
2024	Forbes	United States	"The 50 Best Songs of the 1990s"	22	

(*) indicates the list is unordered.

== Music video ==
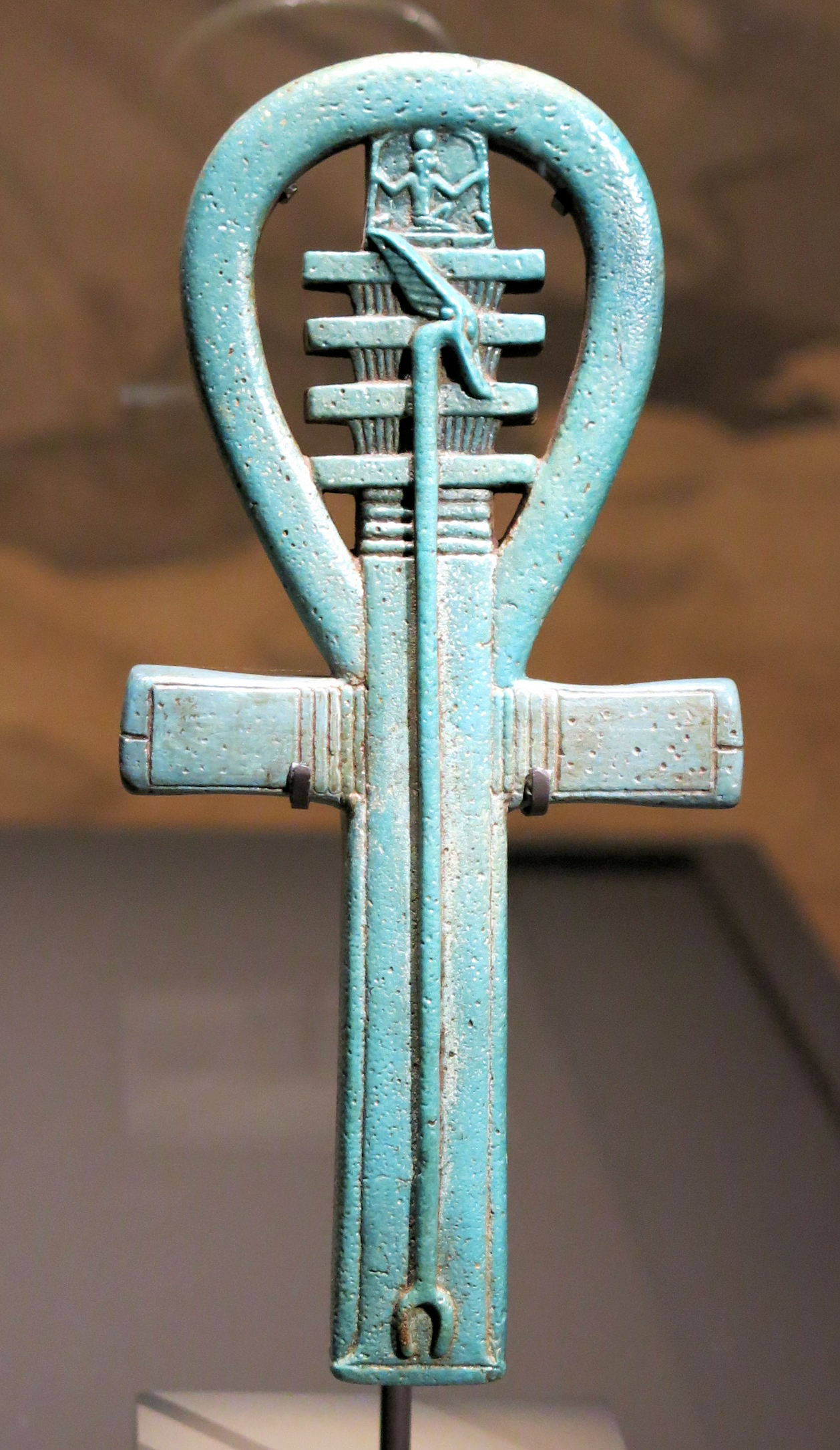
"The Sign" was depicted as a computer-generated ankh–djed–was.

The music video for "The Sign" features the Ace of Base members singing amidst romantic and joyful images. Amid the images is a little story in black-and-white sequences of a man and woman (played by Jenny Berggren) sitting side by side in front of a crumpled backdrop until the man leaves, seemingly abandoning the woman. However, he comes back with a rose and offers it to the woman. She graciously accepts and takes his hand. However, a bright light shines in the woman's face, drawing her away, and she abandons the man and drops the rose on the chair. There are also images of fire, candles, close-up of hands doing signs and the band standing on a spinning platform. The video received heavy rotation on MTV Europe and was A-listed on Germany's VIVA in February 1994. It was also a Box Top on British music television channel The Box same month. It was nominated for Best New Artist Clip of the Year in the category for Pop/AC at the 1994 Billboard Music Video Awards. As of late 2025, "The Sign" has over 152 million views on YouTube.

=== Reception ===
Nanna Søndergaard Larsen from Danish Dagbladet Information remarked in her analyze of the music video for "The Sign", "The video for the ultimate 90's banger "The Sign" is very much the culmination of Ace of Base's video tools. The video manages to have both a kind of narrative track and a strong symbolic image side." Chuck Eddy of LA Weekly labeled it as "fun". Erric Torres from Pitchfork noted that "the charming, greenscreen-heavy video for "The Sign" secured constant rotation on MTV, a vital source of exposure that inspired impostor groups bearing names like Bass of Spades and Box of Laces."

== Track listings ==
US CD single
No.	Title	Length
1.	"The Sign" (Ultimix)	6:49
2.	"The Sign"	3:08
3.	"Young and Proud"	3:56
4.	"Happy Nation" (12" version)	6:40
Total length:		20:37

UK CD single
No.	Title	Length
1.	"The Sign" (radio edit)	3:08
2.	"The Sign" (long version)	4:43
3.	"The Sign" (dub version)	5:10
Total length:		13:01

International CD single
No.	Title	Length
1.	"The Sign"	3:08
2.	"The Sign" (long version)	4:43
Total length:		7:51

Japanese 12-inch single
No.	Title	Length
1.	"The Sign" (Ultimix)	6:46
2.	"The Sign"	3:08
3.	"Young and Proud"	3:56
Total length:		13:50

German 12-inch single – (Remixes)
No.	Title	Length
1.	"The Sign" (the remix)	5:40
2.	"The Sign" (Ultimix)	6:49
3.	"The Sign" (dub version)	5:10
Total length:		17:39

== Credits and personnel ==
Credits adapted from the liner notes of The Sign.

- Vocals by Linn Berggren, Jenny Berggren and Jonas Berggren
- Backing vocals by Linn Berggren, Jenny Berggren, Jonas Berggren and Douglas Carr
- Written by Jonas Berggren
- Produced by Denniz Pop, Douglas Carr and Jonas Berggren
- Recorded at Cheiron Studios

== Charts ==
=== Weekly charts ===
Weekly chart performance for "The Sign" from 1993 to 1994
Chart (1993–1994)	Peak position
Australia (ARIA)	1
Austria (Ö3 Austria Top 40)	3
Belgium (Ultratop 50 Flanders)	5
Canada Top Singles (RPM)	1
Canada Adult Contemporary (RPM)	6
Canada Dance/Urban (RPM)	1
Denmark (IFPI)	1
Europe (Eurochart Hot 100)	2
Europe (European AC Radio)	3
Europe (European Hit Radio)	6
Finland (Suomen virallinen lista)	1
France (SNEP)	5
Germany (GfK)	1
Iceland (Íslenski Listinn Topp 40)	28
Ireland (IRMA)	2
Israel (Israeli Singles Chart)	1
Italy (Musica e dischi)	9
Lithuania (M-1)	2
Mexico (Notitas Musicales)	1
Netherlands (Dutch Top 40)	3
Netherlands (Single Top 100)	3
New Zealand (Recorded Music NZ)	1
Norway (VG-lista)	5
Peru (UPI)	2
Quebec (ADISQ)	4
Scottish Singles Sales (Official Charts)	2
Spain (AFYVE)	1
Sweden (Sverigetopplistan)	2
Switzerland (Schweizer Hitparade)	4
UK Singles (Official Charts)	2
UK Airplay (Music Week)	1
US Billboard Hot 100	1
US Adult Contemporary (Billboard)	2
US Hot Dance Singles Sales (Billboard)	13
US Pop Airplay (Billboard)	1
US Rhythmic Airplay (Billboard)	4
US Cash Box Top 100	1
Zimbabwe (ZIMA)	1

Weekly chart performance for "The Sign" in 2016
Chart (2016)	Peak position
Poland Airplay (ZPAV)	61

=== Year-end charts ===
Year-end chart performance for "The Sign" in 1993
Chart (1993)	Position
Israel (Israeli Singles Chart)	9
Sweden (Topplistan)	26

Year-end chart performance for "The Sign" in 1994
Chart (1994)	Position
Australia (ARIA)	5
Austria (Ö3 Austria Top 40)	9
Belgium (Ultratop)	31
Brazil (Brazilian Radio Airplay)	3
Canada Top Singles (RPM)	8
Canada Adult Contemporary (RPM)	50
Canada Dance/Urban (RPM)	25
Europe (Eurochart Hot 100)	5
Europe (European Hit Radio)	8
Europe Border Breakers (M&M)	1
France (SNEP)	17
Germany (Media Control)	11
Netherlands (Dutch Top 40)	23
Netherlands (Single Top 100)	34
New Zealand (RIANZ)	4
Sweden (Topplistan)	39
Switzerland (Schweizer Hitparade)	22
UK Singles (OCC)	11
UK Airplay (Music Week)	6
US Billboard Hot 100	1
US Adult Contemporary (Billboard)	12
US Billboard Mainstream Top 40	1
US Cash Box Top 100	5

=== Decade-end charts ===
Decade-end chart performance for "The Sign" from 1990 to 1999
Chart (1990–1999)	Position
US Billboard Hot 100	11

=== All-time charts ===
All-time chart performance for "The Sign"
Chart	Position
US Billboard Hot 100	65

== Certifications ==
Certifications and sales for "The Sign"
Region	Certification	Certified units/sales
Australia (ARIA)	Platinum	70,000^{^}
Austria (IFPI Austria)	Gold	25,000^{*}
Denmark (IFPI Danmark)	Gold	45,000^{‡}
Germany (BVMI)	Platinum	500,000^{^}
New Zealand (RMNZ)	Platinum	10,000^{*}
United Kingdom (BPI)	Platinum	600,000^{‡}
United States (RIAA)	Platinum	1,100,000
^{*} Sales figures based on certification alone.^{^} Shipments figures based on certification alone.^{‡} Sales+streaming figures based on certification alone.
