= Happy Nation =

Studio album by Ace of Base
- Released: 2 November 1992
- Recorded: 1991–1992
- Genres: Dance-pop; reggae-pop
- Length: 49:21
- Labels: Mega; PolyGram; Mushroom; Festival
- Producers: Buddha; Joker; Johnny Lindén; Denniz Pop; T.O.E.C.

Ace of Base chronology
Happy Nation (1992)	The Sign (1993)

Alternative cover
- U.S. version (re-release)

Singles from Happy Nation
- 1. "Wheel of Fortune" Released: 29 May 1992; 2. "All That She Wants" Released: 31 August 1992; 3. "Happy Nation" Released: 7 December 1992; 4. "Waiting for Magic" Released: 12 April 1993; 5. "The Sign" Released: 1 November 1993; 6. "Don't Turn Around" Released: 14 March 1994; 7. "Living in Danger" Released: 4 October 1994

Professional ratings
Review scores
Source	Rating
The Encyclopedia of Popular Music	3/5 stars
The Guardian	(favorable)
Music Week	2/5 stars

Happy Nation is the debut studio album by Swedish pop group Ace of Base. It was initially released in Denmark on 2 November 1992 through Mega Records. For its release in North America, Japan, and some Latin American countries, the album was retitled The Sign, featuring a heavily revised track listing along with three new tracks. To coincide with this, Happy Nation was reissued with the new tracks in other territories under the title Happy Nation (U.S. Version).

In 1995, Guinness Book of World Records recognized the LP as the best-selling debut studio effort in music history, with over 19 million copies sold worldwide. By 1998, Happy Nation/The Sign had sold approximately 21 million units, including 9 million in the U.S. alone. Happy Nation/The Sign remains one of the best-selling albums of all time.

== Background and release ==
During the album's development, the group was significantly influenced by a Jamaican reggae band that was recording in a nearby studio.

In an interview with Music & Media magazine, Metronome Records managing director Albert Slendebroek remarked on the album:

Everything was being driven by grunge or techno, then suddenly these people arrived and did something which was completely different and happy and simple. I just think they write brilliant pop tunes and it hit a nerve at the time. (...) I think they've developed their own style. If you listen to the radio and you hear a record, you immediately recognise that it's Ace of Base.

— Albert Slendebroek,

Following its initial release in Denmark in November 1992, Happy Nation was gradually released across Europe throughout 1993, starting in Norway in January, followed by Sweden and Germany in February, and then the UK in June. It was also released in Africa and Latin America, reaching the number one position in at least ten countries.

Happy Nation (U.S. Version) was released on 22 November 1993 to coincide with the album's launch in North America under the title The Sign. This edition featured the new tracks "The Sign", "Living in Danger", and a cover of Tina Turner's "Don't Turn Around", along with a remix of "Waiting for Magic" and a revised version of "Voulez-Vous Danser". It also included the new track "Hear Me Calling", which did not appear on The Sign. However, the songs "Münchhausen (Just Chaos)" and "Dimension of Depth" from the original album were removed. The updated version of the album was released in the UK on 14 March 1994 and climbed to number one on the UK Albums Chart on 26 June, surpassing the original release's peak position of number 21.

In 2016, Russian label Mirumir released an "Ultimate Edition" of the album on vinyl, containing the original track listing from the 1992 release, the additional tracks from The Sign/Happy Nation (U.S. Version) releases, and the iTunes bonuses from all three releases.

== Critical reception ==
Alan Jones from Music Week described the album as a "diverse but largely dance-oriented" collection, noting that it includes "more gentle reggae stuff" alongside some techno and house elements. He felt that "nothing here compares favourably" with "All That She Wants", although he suggested that "if the right tracks are picked and remixed, there are more hits".

== Track listing ==
Happy Nation – original version (1992)
No.	Title	Lyrics	Music	Producer(s)	Length
1.	"Voulez-Vous Danser"	Joker; Buddha	Joker; Buddha	T.O.E.C.; Joker; Buddha	3:17
2.	"All That She Wants"	Joker; Buddha	Joker; Buddha	Denniz Pop; Joker; Buddha	3:30
3.	"Münchhausen (Just Chaos)"	Joker; Buddha	Joker; Buddha	Joker; Buddha	3:27
4.	"Happy Nation"	Joker; Buddha	Joker; Buddha	Joker; Buddha	4:11
5.	"Waiting for Magic"	Joker; Buddha	Joker; Buddha	Joker; Buddha	5:17
6.	"Fashion Party"	Joker	Joker	Joker; Johnny Lindén^{[a]}; Martin Selwall^{[b]}	4:10
7.	"Wheel of Fortune"	Joker; Buddha	Joker; Buddha	T.O.E.C.; Joker; Buddha	3:52
8.	"Dancer in a Daydream"	Joker; Buddha	Joker; Buddha	Joker; Buddha	3:37
9.	"My Mind" (mindless mix)	Joker; Buddha	Joker; Buddha	Joker; Buddha	4:09
10.	"Wheel of Fortune" (original club mix)	Joker; Buddha	Joker; Buddha	T.O.E.C.; Joker; Buddha	3:58
11.	"Dimension of Depth"	N/A	Joker	Joker; Buddha^{[b]}	1:45
12.	"Young and Proud"	Joker; Buddha	Joker; Buddha	Joker; Buddha	3:54
13.	"All That She Wants" (Banghra version)	Joker; Buddha	Joker; Buddha	Denniz Pop; Joker; Buddha	4:14

Happy Nation – remastered standard version (bonus track)
No.	Title	Lyrics	Music	Producer(s)	Length
14.	"Moogoperator"	Joker; Buddha	Joker; Buddha	T.O.E.C.; Joker; Buddha	3:31

Happy Nation – U.S. version
No.	Title	Lyrics	Music	Producer(s)	Length
1.	"All That She Wants"	Joker; Buddha^{[c]}	Joker; Buddha	Joker; Buddha; Denniz Pop	3:30
2.	"Don't Turn Around"	Albert Hammond; Diane Warren	Hammond; Warren	Tommy Ekman; Per Adebratt	3:48
3.	"Young and Proud"	Joker; Buddha^{[c]}	Joker; Buddha	Joker; Buddha	3:56
4.	"The Sign"	Joker	Joker	Joker; Denniz Pop; Douglas Carr; Buddha^{[d]}	3:08
5.	"Living in Danger"	Joker; Buddha^{[c]}	Joker; Buddha	Ekman; Adebratt; T.O.E.C.^{[d]}	3:41
6.	"Voulez-Vous Danser"	Joker; Buddha^{[c]}	Joker; Buddha	T.O.E.C.; Joker; Buddha	3:17
7.	"Happy Nation"	Joker; Buddha^{[c]}	Joker; Buddha	Joker; Buddha	4:13
8.	"Hear Me Calling"	Linn; Jenny	Joker; Buddha; Linn; Jenny	Buddha; Stonestream^{[a]}; John Ballard^{[a]}	3:48
9.	"Waiting for Magic" (total remix 7")	Joker; Buddha^{[c]}	Joker; Buddha	Buddha; Stonestream	3:50
10.	"Fashion Party"	Joker; Buddha^{[c]}	Joker; Buddha	Joker	4:10
11.	"Wheel of Fortune"	Joker; Buddha^{[c]}	Joker; Buddha	Joker; Buddha; T.O.E.C.	3:52
12.	"Dancer in a Daydream"	Joker; Buddha^{[c]}	Joker; Buddha	Joker; Buddha	3:37
13.	"My Mind" (mindless mix)	Joker; Buddha^{[c]}	Joker; Buddha	Joker; Buddha	4:08
14.	"All That She Wants" (Banghra version)	Joker; Buddha^{[c]}	Joker; Buddha	Joker; Buddha; Denniz Pop	4:14
15.	"Happy Nation" (Remix)	Joker; Buddha^{[c]}	Joker; Buddha	Joker; Buddha; Ekman^{[e]}; Carr^{[e]}	3:45

Happy Nation – remastered U.S. version (bonus track)
No.	Title	Length
16.	"Giving It Up" (Ace Version)	3:29

Happy Nation - China edition
No.	Title	Length
1.	"All That She Wants"	3:30
2.	"Happy Nation"	4:11
3.	"Wheel of Fortune" (original club mix)	3:58
4.	"Voulez-Vous Danser"	3:17
5.	"Young and Proud"	3:54
6.	"Dancer in a Daydream"	3:37
7.	"Waiting for Magic"	5:17
8.	"My Mind" (mindless mix)	4:09
9.	"Fashion Party"	4:10
10.	"All That She Wants" (Banghra version)	4:14

Happy Nation – U.S. version (All That She Wants: The Classic Collection)
No.	Title	Length
14.	"All That She Wants" (Banghra version)	4:14

Notes

- ^{^[a]} signifies a co-producer
- ^{^[b]} signifies re-editing
- ^{^[c]} signifies rap lyrics
- ^{^[d]} signifies pre-production
- ^{^[e]} signifies a remixer

== Release history ==
Region	Date	Label
Denmark	2 November 1992	Mega
Germany	22 February 1993	PolyGram
United Kingdom	7 June 1993	London Records 90
Europe (re-issue)	22 November 1993	Mega / PolyGram
United Kingdom (re-issue)	14 March 1994	London Records 90

== Charts ==
=== Weekly charts ===
Chart performance for Happy Nation
Chart (1992–94)	Peak position
Australian Albums (ARIA)	9
Austrian Albums (Ö3 Austria)	3
Dutch Albums (Album Top 100)	2
Finnish Albums (Suomen virallinen lista)	2
French Albums (SNEP)	1
German Albums (Offizielle Top 100)	1
Hungarian Albums (MAHASZ)	1
Italian Albums (Musica e dischi)	16
New Zealand Albums (RMNZ)	1
Norwegian Albums (VG-lista)	1
Portuguese Albums (AFP)	1
Scottish Albums (Official Charts)	3
Swedish Albums (Sverigetopplistan)	3
Swiss Albums (Schweizer Hitparade)	2
UK Albums (Official Charts)	1

Chart performance for Happy Nation (U.S. Version)
Chart (1994)	Peak position
Austrian Albums (Ö3 Austria)	3
Norwegian Albums (VG-lista)	13
Swedish Albums (Sverigetopplistan)	3
Swiss Albums (Schweizer Hitparade)	8

=== Year-end charts ===
Year-end chart performance for Happy Nation
Chart (1993)	Position
Austrian Albums (Ö3 Austria)	8
Dutch Albums (Album Top 100)	20
German Albums (Offizielle Top 100)	3
Swiss Albums (Schweizer Hitparade)	3
Chart (1994)	Position
Australian Albums (ARIA)	80
Dutch Albums (Album Top 100)	17
French Albums (SNEP)	2
German Albums (Offizielle Top 100)	7
New Zealand Albums (RMNZ)	1

Year-end chart performance for Happy Nation (U.S. Version)
Chart (1994)	Position
Austrian Albums (Ö3 Austria)	19
Swiss Albums (Schweizer Hitparade)	9

== Certifications and sales ==
Region	Certification	Certified units/sales
Australia (ARIA)	Platinum	70,000^{^}
Austria (IFPI Austria)	Platinum	50,000^{*}
Denmark (IFPI Danmark)	2× Platinum	160,000^{^}
Denmark (IFPI Danmark) Reissue	2× Platinum	40,000^{‡}
Finland (Musiikkituottajat)	Gold	82,715
France (SNEP)	Diamond	1,000,000^{*}
Germany (BVMI)	3× Platinum	1,500,000^{^}
Korea	—	700,000
Netherlands (NVPI)	2× Platinum	200,000^{^}
Mexico	—	500,000
Malaysia	—	200,000
New Zealand (RMNZ)	Platinum	15,000^{^}
Spain (Promusicae)	Platinum	100,000^{^}
Switzerland (IFPI Switzerland)	Platinum	50,000^{^}
Sweden	—	50,000
Switzerland (IFPI Switzerland) Happy Nation (US version)	Platinum	50,000^{^}
United Kingdom (BPI)	2× Platinum	600,000^{^}
Summaries
Worldwide	—	21,000,000
^{*} Sales figures based on certification alone.^{^} Shipments figures based on certification alone.^{‡} Sales+streaming figures based on certification alone.

== See also ==
- List of best-selling albums in France
- List of best-selling albums in Germany
- List of best-selling albums
- List of diamond-certified albums in Canada
- List of number-one albums of 1994 (U.S.)
- List of UK Albums Chart number ones of the 1990s
