= Friends (Stella Getz song) =

Single by Stella Getz

from the album Forbidden Dreams
- B-side: "Remix"
- Released: November 1993
- Genre: Eurodance
- Length: 3:12
- Label: Mega Records
- Songwriters: Stella Getz; Lars E. Ludvigsen; Mikkel S. Eriksen
- Producers: Lars E. Ludvigsen; Mikkel S. Eriksen

Stella Getz singles chronology
"Friends" (1993)	"Dr. Love" (1994)

Music video
- "Friends" on YouTube

"Friends" is the debut single by Norwegian singer-songwriter Stella Getz. Co-written by her with producers Lars E. Ludvigsen and Mikkel S. Eriksen, it was released in November 1993 by Mega Records as the first single from the singer's debut album, Forbidden Dreams (1994). The song was successful in several countries, peaking at number-one in Hungary and Israel. In Scandinavia, "Friends" was a top-10 hit, peaking at number five in Norway and number nine in Denmark. Its accompanying music video was directed by Matt Broadley.

== Background and release ==
Getz was discovered after entering a DMC contest at the age of 16. After having cut just a few demos, she soon got herself a deal with Mega Records and went into studio with producers Lars E. Ludvigsen and Mikkel S. Eriksen to work on her first single, "Friends". It has been described as a fusion of loud but subtle rock guitars with a techno foundation, highlighted by a remarkable melody and Getz' fog horn-strength vocals. She made her first public appearance on Norwegian Television performing the song in the popular TV-show Casino.

== Critical reception ==
Pan-European magazine Music & Media wrote, "The instant appeal of the single is clear, and so is the 17-year old singer with African blood in her veins. A stunning synth riff like on Stevie Wonder's 'Superstitious' are the wheels on which this song rides. Miss Getz raps and scats—what else with such a jazzy surname?—on top of that. The sing-along chorus is the finishing touch of the song, easily holding its own in the Euro dance field which is suffering already too much from conventions, making it almost impossible to say who's who. With the Winter Olympics in Lillehammer ahead, one gold medal should go to Norway at least. For originality."

== Chart performance ==
"Friends" was successful on the charts in several countries, including peaking at number-one in both Hungary and Israel. It also reached the top 5 in Norway, and the top 10 in Denmark, peaking at numbers five and nine. In Norway, it paked in its second week on VG-lista in December 1993 and spent four weeks at number five, with a total of 10 weeks within the chart. In Denmark, "Friends" jumped from number 19 to its peak on 9 April 1994. In Germany, it peaked at number 32, with a total of 16 weeks on the charts. The single also peaked at number 81 on the Eurochart Hot 100 in February 1994, in its second week on the chart after debuting as number 97. By March 1995, it was reported by Norwegian newspaper Arbeiderbladet that "Friends" had sold 88,000 units all over the world.

== Music video ==
A music video directed by Swedish-based director Matt Broadley was produced by Mega Records to promote the single. He had previously directed videos for group's like Ace of Base and Culture Beat. The video for "Friends" depicts the singer in a big yellow-painted room. Through a telescope she sees a crowd of "friends" arriving and then starts singing. The "friends" are coming through the door, although Getz tries to keep them outside. Wearing white masks, they're taking over the place, breaking LP-records, dancing on them and eating all the food in the fridge. They are also tagging down the walls with graffiti spray, and in the end, the "friends" are dancing around Getz, who has been tied with a rope to a tall lamp. The video was A-listed on German music television channel VIVA and MTV Europe put it on "prime break out" rotation in March 1994. It was later made available on Mega Records's official YouTube channel in 2011.

== Track listing ==
- CD maxi
1. "Friends" (7") — 3:12
2. "Friends" (12") — 7:14
3. "Friends" (Late Nite Mix) — 4:38
4. "Friends" (U.S. Remix) — 2:55
- CD maxi (Remix)
1. "Friends" (MEGA-Dance Remix) — 5:34
2. "Friends" (Cyber-Town Remix) — 5:06
3. "Friends" (Tango Remix) — 2:52
4. "Friends" (Hi-Rate Remix) — 6:18

== Charts ==
Chart (1993–94)	Peak position
Denmark (IFPI)	9
Europe (Eurochart Hot 100)	81
Germany (GfK)	32
Hungary (Mahasz)	1
Israel (Israeli Singles Chart)	7
Norway (VG-lista)	5
