= Dr. Love (song) =

Single by Stella Getz

from the album Forbidden Dreams
- B-side: "Remix"
- Released: 1994
- Genre: Europop
- Length: 2:53
- Label: Mega Records
- Songwriters: Lars E. Ludvigsen; Mikkel S. Eriksen
- Producers: Lars E. Ludvigsen; Mikkel S. Eriksen

Stella Getz singles chronology
"Friends" (1993)	"Dr. Love" (1994)	"Yeah Yeah" (1994)

Music video
- "Dr. Love" on YouTube

"Dr. Love" is a song by Norwegian singer Stella Getz, released in 1994 by Mega Records as the second single from the singer's debut album, Forbidden Dreams (1994). The song was written and produced by Lars E. Ludvigsen and Mikkel S. Eriksen, becoming a top-10 hit in Denmark and a top-30 hit in Germany, with a total of 11 weeks on the charts. In Getz' native Norway, it reached number three on the radio chart Ti i skuddet. Outside Europe, "Dr. Love" was successful in Israel, peaking at number seven. The accompanying music video was directed by Nick Burgess-Jones. It was A-listed on German music television channel VIVA in July 1994.

== Critical reception ==
British magazine Music Week wrote in their review, "Bouncy Euro pop meets MC Kinky in this track by the 17-year-old Norwegian/Nigerian dancer and rapper who has Ace of Base as stablemates. The selection of ever harder dub mixes will get dancefloors pumping." The song was given a top score of five out of five by The Mad Stuntman in Smash Hits in January 1995.

== Track listing ==
- UK CD single
1. "Dr. Love" (7" Version) — 2:53
2. "Dr. Love" (Extended Version) — 3:58
3. "Dr. Love" (Vocal Mix) — 6:04
4. "Dr. Love" (Dub Mix) — 6:05
5. "Dr. Love" (Hard Love Dub Mix) — 7:20
6. "Dr. Love" (Hard Love Mix) — 8:22
- Scandinavia CD maxi
1. "Dr. Love" (US Remix) — 2:24
2. "Dr. Love" (7" Version) — 2:53
3. "Dr. Love" (Dance Mix) — 6:33
4. "Dr. Love" (Medicine Man 12") — 10:21

== Charts ==
Chart (1994–95)	Peak positions
Denmark (IFPI)	6
Germany (Official German Charts)	30
Israel (Israeli Singles Chart)	7
Norway (Ti i skuddet)	3
UK Singles (OCC)	124
UK Dance (OCC)	39
UK Club Chart (Music Week)	55
