= The Colour of My Dreams (song) =

Single by B.G., the Prince of Rap

from the album The Time Is Now
- B-side: "Remix"
- Released: April 1994
- Genre: Eurodance
- Length: 3:54
- Label: Dance Pool
- Songwriters: Jam El Mar; Stefan Benz; Morrison Long; B.G. The Prince of Rap
- Producers: Jam El Mar; Stefan Benz

B.G., the Prince of Rap singles chronology
"Can We Get Enough?" (1993)	"The Colour of My Dreams" (1994)	"Rock a Bit" (1994)

"The Colour of My Dreams" is a song recorded by American rapper and Eurodance artist B.G., the Prince of Rap, released in April 1994 by Dance Pool as the second single from his second album, The Time Is Now (1994). The song features female singer Paris Red and was written by B.G. with Morrison Long and its producers Jam El Mar and Stefan Benz. It became his most successful song and a hit across Europe, becoming a top-20 hit in Finland and Germany, peaking at numbers 17 and 13, respectively. On the Eurochart Hot 100, it reached number 72 in July 1994. Outside Europe, "The Colour of My Dreams" peaked at number-one on the Canadian RPM Dance/Urban chart and number ten in Israel.

== Critical reception ==
Upon the release of the single, pan-European magazine Music & Media wrote, "Although the overall feeling here is mellow with some ambient influences shining through, B.G.'s latest is still very much a dancefloor killer. Its crystal-clear sound and strong hooks should help it find a place on radio as well." In their review of the album The Time Is Now, they wrote, "Now they are reaping what they've sown with the current single 'The Colour of My Dreams', which is likely to become a major Euro dance hit all over the continent."

== Music video ==
The accompanying music video for "The Colour of My Dreams" was directed by Swedish-based director Matt Broadley. It received "prime break out" rotation on MTV Europe and was A-listed on German music television channel VIVA in June 1994.

== Track listings ==
- CD maxi-single (Europe, 1994)
1. "The Colour of My Dreams" (Dreamedia-Mix) – 3:54
2. "The Colour of My Dreams" (Dreamidnight-Mix) – 5:24
3. "The Colour of My Dreams" (Dream-In-House-Mix) – 5:45
- CD maxi-single - Remix (Europe, 1994)
1. "The Colour of My Dreams" (TN'T Radio Version) – 3:40
2. "The Colour of My Dreams" (African Jungle Cut) – 6:24
3. "The Colour of My Dreams" (TN'T Party Prince-Mix) – 5:54
4. "The Colour of My Dreams" (Blue & Grey & Light) – 6:16

== Charts ==
=== Weekly charts ===
Chart (1994)	Peak position
Canada Dance/Urban (RPM)	1
Europe (Eurochart Hot 100)	72
Europe (European Dance Radio)	17
Finland (Suomen virallinen lista)	17
Germany (GfK)	13
Israel (Israeli Singles Chart)	10
Netherlands (Dutch Top 40 Tipparade)	6
Netherlands (Single Top 100)	39
Switzerland (Schweizer Hitparade)	48

=== Year-end charts ===
Chart (1994)	Position
Canada Dance/Urban (RPM)	11
Germany (Official German Charts)	59
