= B.G., the Prince of Rap =

American rapper and eurodance artist (1965–2023)

Background information
- Born: Bernard Greene; September 28, 1965; Washington, D.C., U.S.
- Died: January 21, 2023 (aged 57) Wiesbaden, Hesse, Germany
- Genres: Hip hop; Eurodance; hip house; techno
- Occupations: Rapper; singer; songwriter; musician
- Instrument: Vocals
- Years active: 1990–2023
- Label: Dance Pool

Bernard Greene (September 28, 1965 – January 21, 2023), also known as B.G. the Prince of Rap, was an American rapper and singer. He experienced modest success in Germany, where he lived after being posted by the U.S. Army.

== Early life ==
Greene was born in Washington, D.C., United States. He joined the United States Army after graduating from high school and was posted to Germany in 1985.

== Musical career ==
His biggest hit came in 1991, when he reached number one on the US Hot Dance Music/Club Play chart with "This Beat Is Hot". The single made it to number 72 on the U.S. Billboard Hot 100, and number 54 on the U.S. Billboard Hot Black singles chart. He followed that up with "Take Control of The Party", which reached number 2 on the dance chart the following year. This track also peaked at number 71 in the UK Singles Chart in January 1992. He had a few more hits in the 1990s: "The Power of Rhythm", "Can We Get Enough?", "The Colour of My Dreams", and "Stomp!"

== Death ==
Greene died in Wiesbaden on January 21, 2023, at the age of 57. He was suffering from prostate cancer in his final years.

== Discography ==
=== Studio albums ===
Title	Album details
The Power of Rhythm	Release date: September 10, 1991; Label: Dance Pool; Formats: CD
The Time Is Now	Release date: May 16, 1994; Label: Dance Pool; Formats: CD
Get the Groove On	Release date: June 14, 1996; Label: Dance Pool; Formats: CD
"—" denotes releases that did not chart.

=== Singles ===
Year	Single	Peak chart positions												Album
Year	Single	AUS	CAN Dance	GER	FIN	ITA	NL	NZ	SWE	SWI	UK	US	US Dance	Album
1990	"Rap to the World"	—		—	—	—	—	—	—	—	—	—	—	The Power of Rhythm
1991	"This Beat Is Hot"	93	1	21	—	—	—	30	—	—	—	72	1	The Power of Rhythm
1991	"Give Me the Music"	—		36	—	—	—	—	—	—	—	—	—	The Power of Rhythm
1991	"Take Control of the Party"	—	3	49	—	—	—	—	—	—	71	—	2	The Power of Rhythm
1992	"The Power of Rhythm"	—		49	—	—	—	—	—	—	—	—	32	The Power of Rhythm
1993	"Can We Get Enough?"	—	8	34	—	7	—	—	28	—	—	—	—	The Time Is Now
1994	"The Colour of My Dreams"	—	1	13	—	—	39	—	—	48	—	—	—	The Time Is Now
1994	"Rock a Bit"	—		37	—	—	—	—	—	—	—	—	—	The Time Is Now
1995	"Can't Love You"	—	4	45	—	—	—	—	—	—	—	—	—	The Time Is Now
1996	"Stomp!"	—	2	53	15	—	—	22	—	—	—	—	—	Get the Groove On
1996	"Jump to This (Allnight!)"	—		—	—	—	—	—	—	—	—	—	—	Get the Groove On
1996	"Take Me Through the Night"	—		—	—	—	—	—	—	—	—	—	—	Get the Groove On
"—" denotes releases that did not chart or were not released.

== See also ==
- List of Number 1 Dance Hits (United States)
- List of artists who reached number one on the US Dance chart
