= All That She Wants =

1992 single by Ace of Base

- Scandinavian CD variant of the standard European artwork

Single by Ace of Base

from the album Happy Nation and The Sign
- B-side: "Fashion Party"
- Released: 31 August 1992
- Recorded: August 1992
- Studio: SweMix Studios Stockholm, Sweden
- Genre: Dance-pop; reggae pop; synth-pop; Europop
- Length: 3:30
- Label: Mega; London; Arista
- Songwriters: Jonas Berggren; Ulf Ekberg
- Producers: Denniz Pop; Jonas Berggren; Ulf Ekberg

Ace of Base singles chronology
"Wheel of Fortune" (1992)	"All That She Wants" (1992)	"Happy Nation" (1992)

Music video
- "All That She Wants" on YouTube

"All That She Wants" is a song by the Swedish group Ace of Base. It was released in Scandinavia in August 1992, by Mega Records, as the second single from the group's debut studio album, Happy Nation (1992), and in the following year, it was released as the first single from the 1993 album The Sign in North America. Produced by Denniz Pop with group members Jonas Berggren and Ulf Ekberg, the drum beat was inspired by the Kayo song "Another Mother". Berggren and Ekberg also wrote the lyrics.

"All That She Wants" is a reggae pop song that describes a sexually promiscuous woman, with the word "baby" being synonymous with "boyfriend". The song was first recorded in 1991, but went through many revisions before it was officially released.

The song was a commercial success, reaching the top of the charts in many countries, including Denmark, Germany, the UK and Australia. It spent 13 weeks at the top of the Danish singles chart. The single was certified platinum in the United States, where it peaked at number two on the Billboard Hot 100 and was one of the best-selling singles of that year. Its music video was directed by Matt Broadley and filmed in Copenhagen, Denmark.

In 2007, the song was re-recorded by the band as a three-piece with new lyrics in a first-person perspective, but was never officially released. This re-recording was leaked online in June 2016 in a collaboration version of the song that features new Ace of Base vocals alongside Britney Spears's vocals from her own 2007 demo version.

== Background ==
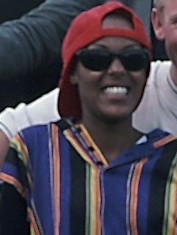
Ace of Base was influenced by Kayo's "Another Mother" to create "All That She Wants".

While the group's predecessor single, "Wheel of Fortune", was a modest success, "All That She Wants" led Ace of Base to take off internationally. In 1991, the group produced a demo version of "All That She Wants", titled "Mr. Ace", which featured different lyrics, Linn Berggren on lead vocals, and rap vocals performed by both Jonas and Ekberg. But they were not able to create the exact sound they were looking for, despite their attempts to get inspiration by listening to several other artists. After the release of the Swedish top 20 hit "Another Mother" by Kayo, the band finally found the drum beat they were looking for.

Jonas and Ekberg contacted the producer of "Another Mother", Denniz Pop, and sent him a demo tape featuring the song. Though Denniz was initially unimpressed with the song, the tape got stuck in the cassette tape player in his car. Because of this, he was forced to listen to it over and over again, which helped him decide to help produce the track.

== Composition ==
"She's searching around for happiness. She meets a lot of guys. She thinks, 'Oh, this is the guy', but the day after, she needs something else. It's a typical girl in Sweden or Norway or Germany. In the lyrics you don't know how it ends, but in the video she meets the real guy. She takes his hand and she's lucky."

— Jonas Berggren talking to Spin about the song.

Denniz Pop introduced many changes to the song. He was not fond of the rap vocals on the original demo, and these were subsequently replaced with short spoken word sections. A new second verse was also added. Though vocals were recorded by all four members for this version, Jenny's vocals were eventually cut on the final release. The song was initially in a major key, but was changed to minor upon Linn's insistence. Jenny Berggren, sister to Linn and Jonas, explained that changing the key to minor allowed the song to portray a greater level of sadness and increased its relatability. Some of the other material on the Happy Nation album stemmed from "All That She Wants", leading the album to have a darker sound.

Jenny noted that it was about "a woman who is always leaving and that is because the woman is not whole in herself." Jonas stated that the song "is about a girl I knew a long time ago, but I didn't [realize that] when I did the lyrics."

== Release ==
Following its release on 31 August 1992, "All That She Wants" quickly climbed to number one on the Danish chart while "Wheel of Fortune" was still sitting at number two. The song became a commercial success, reaching the top of the charts in at least fourteen countries worldwide. It was certified platinum in the United States, after peaking at number two on the Billboard Hot 100. Keen to rush out an album for the Christmas market, Mega Records pressed the band for an album and it was hastily recorded, mixed, and released within a few weeks. Denniz Pop would go on to co-produce all officially released versions of the song that were available at the time, notably a more uptempo version of the song, dubbed the "Madness Version". This version features entirely different vocals and more spoken-word sections. Ace of Base would later collaborate with Denniz Pop on "The Sign" and multiple tracks on the band's sophomore release, The Bridge.

In 2014, the original demo version of the song was released as a bonus track called "Mister Ace (Demo 1991)" on the remastered version of the album The Sign.

== Reception ==
=== Critical reception ===
==== American reception ====
AllMusic editor Stephen Thomas Erlewine said that it is easy to see why the song was a hit: "the beat is relentless and the hooks are incessantly catchy". Thomas Ginsberg from Associated Press noted its "unique sound". A writer for The Baltimore Sun called it Ace of Base's "finest, loneliest hit". Larry Flick from Billboard magazine wrote that the group "wears its ABBA influences proudly on this shuffling, reggae-splashed ditty." He added, "Factor in curious and vague lyrics, and you have a left-of-center offering that may entice quirky minds, but will probably leave most scratching their heads." Dave Sholin from the Gavin Report commented, "The last time a new act from Sweden came on this strong it was Roxette with 'The Look'. Since we got hold of the import several months ago, the word about this release has spread. Not every song that reaches #1 in the U.K. like this one did succeeds in America, but they all would if they were this hot. Can't imagine it would take more than one listen to be convinced." Chuck Eddy from LA Weekly stated, "As far as I can remember, 'All That She Wants' by Ace of Base is the only hit single ever to talk about a lady who uses men for stud service so that she can become an unwed mother." He added that it "has the frostbit feel of ABBA's ballads about working women", and noted 'how she warns "She's gonna getcha" in a demonic Eurodisco catwoman voice.'

Fred Shuster from Los Angeles Daily News said it is a "supremely catchy pop confection with a bouncy reggae-inspired bass line and a chorus that lodges itself in the brain with deadly precision." Dennis Hunt from Los Angeles Times wrote that it has "a strong European pop-synth feel, cruising on reggae undercurrents and mined with some deadly hooks." Mario Tarradell from the Miami Herald stated, "Just try to shake the irresistible hook of 'All That She Wants' and 'Happy Nation': you won't succeed." Jim Farber from the New York Daily News named it "the weirdest song on the radio now", adding that it "revives the dinky-sounding synths of early '80s new wave, smelts it to an improbable reggae beat, then plops on vocals by a woman whose grasp of English barely exceeds the phonetic." He concluded with that the song "could easily end up the 'Maneater' of the '90s." Neil Strauss from The New York Times called it a "reggae-infused dance-floor sleeper" that "tells of a troubled woman's search for romantic fulfillment in one-night-stands." Steve Dougherty from People Magazine deemed it a "hummable [and] reggae-flavored" tune. A reviewer from Press-Telegram stated that it's "packed with unforgettable hooks." The Rolling Stone Album Guide noted that the "Ennio Morricone-style keyboard whistle marks the welfare-state cautionary tale 'All That She Wants'. Chuck Campbell from Scripps Howard News Service called it "a lilting dance song about a woman seeking a steady stream of boyfriends", noting that it "had remarkable staying power on the charts".

==== European reception ====
Irish Evening Herald described the song as "pure pop Esperanto. Simple, sublime and subversive. The weirdest record since Boney M's 'Rasputin'. A reviewer from Swedish Göteborgs-Posten said it "smells a little like Dr. Alban with its reggae". Ben Thompson from The Independent wrote, "The first No 1 from Sweden since Abba. Who said pop was dead?" In his weekly UK chart commentary, James Masterton said, "Ace Of Base doing a Sub Sub if you like and making a stirring chart debut by being not only the current trendy dance hit but also a damn good pop tune and receiving a bucketload of radio airplay as a result." He also declared it as a "perfectly crafted piece of dub-reggae". Simon Price from Melody Maker felt the "lilting plinky-plink reggae" of the track "is pure 1979." He added, "The first 10 times I heard 'All That She Wants', it was the greatest record on earth, a City Limits-reading radical lesbian's attack on our conveyor-belt, Baby Machine culture." After it had reached number-one in Denmark in 1992, Music & Media declared the song as "another great example of a band which has successfully drawn the pop reggae card." Sylvia Patterson from Smash Hits viewed it as "unfeasibly catchy".

=== Commercial performance ===
"All That She Wants" reached the number-one position in at least fourteen countries: Australia (3 weeks), Austria (6 weeks), Belgium (2 weeks), Canada (2 weeks), Denmark (13 weeks), Germany (8 weeks), Greece (10 weeks), Iceland, Israel (3 weeks), Italy (9 weeks), Mexico, Spain (2 weeks), Switzerland (2 weeks), and the United Kingdom. In the latter, it peaked in its third week at the UK Singles Chart, on 16 May 1993. It spent three weeks at the top position on the chart after debuting as number five. The song peaked at top three positions in most other places where it was released. "All That She Wants" peaked at number two on the Eurochart Hot 100 in June, being held off the top position by Snow's "Informer". The song was a very successful radio hit in the United States, peaking at number one on the US Billboard Top 40 Mainstream chart. On the Billboard Hot 100 and Cash Box Top 100, it peaked at number two and three. On the Canadian RPM Dance/Urban chart, it peaked at number one for 4 weeks.

"All That She Wants" was listed at number nine on the Billboard 1994 year-end charts and at number 70 on the 1990s decade-end charts. In Germany, the song was the best-selling single of 1993. It sold 604,000 copies in the United Kingdom in 1993. According to Mega Records, the single sold 3.7 million copies worldwide as of May 1998.

=== Retrospective response ===
In 2018, Annie Zaleski from The A.V. Club wrote, "The song—which can be read as either a celebration of a woman who enjoys one-night stands, or a warning to her potential suitors—is a catchy marvel of simplicity. A glacial synth hum and strolling reggae rhythm provide propulsion, while the occasional saxophone curlicue and mysterious whistle give it intrigue, as well as a hint of melancholy." A writer for Birmingham Evening Mail described it as a "happy uplifting reggae-influenced" song. Matt Stopera and Brian Galindo from BuzzFeed named it "the best Ace of Base song. End of story. No contest." Nikola Nedeljkovic Gøttsche from Dagbladet Information noted in their retrospective review of The Sign, that "the song about the promiscuous man-hunter who only wants one more lover, with its mysterious flute melodies, progressive reggae pulse and instantly obsessive chorus, became a marker in the nineties popular musical landscape."

Tom Ewing of Freaky Trigger wrote that "All That She Wants" is "so startling that you imagined a whole style around it. The sound of "All That She Wants" is disarmingly simple – high, clear, piping synths over a basic skank – but also quite perfect. It's a cooling sound, it makes the rest of pop sound busy and overheated. As the song so poetically puts it, "It's not a day for work – it's a day for catching time". Bob Waliszewski of Plugged In found that the song "warns a young man about a woman out for a one-night stand ("She's a hunter, you're the fox... beware of that flashing in her eyes")." In 2023, Eric Torres from Pitchfork complimented it as "near-perfect". Pop Rescue praised it as "fantastic", remarking that "it's a simple uncluttered track, and it works perfectly." Christopher Smith from Talk About Pop Music viewed it as a "quirky number".

=== Accolades ===
Year	Publisher	Country	Accolade	Rank
1994	Music & Media	United Kingdom	"The 10 Most Successful Eurochart Hot 100 Singles"	1
1995	BMI	United States	"BMI Pop Awards"	*
1995	Life	United States	"The Best Recordings of the 90's"	*
2011	MTV Dance	United Kingdom	"The 100 Biggest 90's Dance Anthems of All Time"	56
2012	Max	Australia	"1000 Greatest Songs of All Time"	649
2012	Porcys	Poland	"100 Singli 1990-1999"	40
2013	Vibe	United States	"Before EDM: 30 Dance Tracks from the '90s that Changed the Game"	6
2015	Robert Dimery	United States	"1,001 Songs You Must Hear Before You Die, and 10,001 You Must Download (2015 Update)"	*
2017	BuzzFeed	United States	"The 101 Greatest Dance Songs of the '90s"	18
2018	Time Out	United Kingdom	"The 50 Best Pop Songs"	36
2018	Time Out	United Kingdom	"50 Best '90s Songs"	48
2019	Billboard	United States	"Billboard's Top Songs of the '90s"	71
2019	Harper's Bazaar	United Kingdom	"16 '90s Songs that Will Give You Instant Nostalgia"	*
2019	Max	Australia	"1000 Greatest Songs of All Time"	914
2022	Billboard	United States	"The Biggest No. 2 Hot 100 Hits of All Time"	38
2023	Time Out	United Kingdom	"The 100 Best Party Songs Ever Made"	29
2026	Billboard	United States	"The Biggest No. 2 Hot 100 Hits of All Time"	42

(*) indicates the list is unordered.

== Music video ==
A music video directed by Swedish director Matt Broadley was produced in November 1992 to promote the single. Danish actress and singer-songwriter Christiane Bjørg Nielsen appears in the video as the title character. The video was filmed in Nielsen's apartment in Ryesgade in central Copenhagen in one day, on a budget of $2000.

The video, shot in sepia tone, depicts the band members performing in a cramped apartment, interlaced with shots of a woman getting ready to go out. She goes to a bar where she meets a man. They talk and then she takes him home to her. Though Jenny has no vocals in the song, she lip syncs the vocals during the chorus. Ulf Ekberg noted, "The video is also an explanation for the song, because in the song you don't know if she found a guy or not, but [the video shows] a happy ending." The band discovered Nielsen's apartment just by chance as they shared the same manager. She told in an interview, "They just came up to my apartment to pick something up, but when they saw it, they were absolutely determined that the video should be shot right there. After all, I had a grand piano and a black and white checkered floor, so it was just a perfect location." Nanna Søndergaard Larsen from Danish Dagbladet Information remarked in her analyze of the video, "The apartment is not only full of a mixed assortment of furniture and mannequins, but also the four members of the band are seated at tables, in armchairs, on windowsills all around the small living room."

Ekberg later said that MTV pushed the song as they "loved the video because it was so clean." Being known as an actress only in Denmark, Nielsen's appearance in the video led her to being recognized all over the world. Nielsen mentioned an incident while she was shopping in New York, "I was walking around looking at shoes in a shoe store when a woman grabbed me and said "oh my God, you're the girl from the video".

== Track listings ==
- United Kingdom CD single
1. "All That She Wants" (Radio Edit)
2. "All That She Wants" (12" Version)
3. "All That She Wants" (Banghra Version)
4. "All That She Wants" (Madness Version)
- United States CD single
1. "All That She Wants" – 3:31
2. "All That She Wants" (Extended Single/Dub Version) – 7:56
3. "All That She Wants" (Banghra Version) – 4:15
4. "All That She Wants" (12" Version) – 6:46
- Australian CD single
1. "All That She Wants" (Radio Edit)
2. "Fashion Party"
- All That She Wants (Remixed) – Standard Digital Download
1. All That She Wants (Funkstar De Luxe Cook 'n' Curry Remix) – 3:27
2. All That She Wants (We Are Legends Remix) – 6:18
3. All That She Wants (Bali Bandits Remix) – 4:00
4. All That She Wants (Joeysuki Remix) – 4:51
5. All That She Wants (Andalo Remix) – 3:24
6. All That She Wants (House of Titans Remix) – 3:55
7. All That She Wants (Marc MacRowland Remix) – 6:01
8. All That She Wants (Funkstar De Luxe Cook 'n' Curry Remix Extended) – 4:52
9. All That She Wants (Bali Bandits Remix Extended) – 6:01
10. All That She Wants (Andalo Remix Extended) – 5:41
- All That She Wants (Remixed) – Beatport Edition Digital Download
1. All That She Wants (We Are Legends Remix) – 6:18
2. All That She Wants (Joeysuki Remix) – 4:51
3. All That She Wants (House of Titans Remix) – 3:55
4. All That She Wants (Marc MacRowland Remix) – 6:01
5. All That She Wants (Funkstar De Luxe Cook 'n' Curry Remix Extended) – 4:52
6. All That She Wants (Bali Bandits Remix Extended) – 6:01
7. All That She Wants (Andalo Remix Extended) – 5:41
8. All That She Wants (Bali Bandits Remix Extended Instrumental) – 6:00
9. All That She Wants (Andalo Remix Extended Instrumental) – 5:41

== Release history ==
Region	Date	Label
Denmark	31 August 1992	Mega
Sweden	16 November 1992	Mega
United Kingdom	26 April 1993	London
United States	27 August 1993	Arista
Japan	16 December 1993	Arista

== Charts ==
=== Weekly charts ===
Chart (1992–1994)	Peak position
Australia (ARIA)	1
Austria (Ö3 Austria Top 40)	1
Belgium (Ultratop 50 Flanders)	1
Canada Retail Singles (The Record)	4
Canada Top Singles (RPM)	1
Canada Dance/Urban (RPM)	1
Denmark (IFPI)	1
Europe (Eurochart Hot 100)	2
Europe (European Dance Radio)	12
Europe (European Hit Radio)	7
Finland (Suomen virallinen lista)	4
France (SNEP)	2
Germany (GfK)	1
Greece (Pop + Rock)	1
Iceland (Íslenski Listinn Topp 40)	1
Ireland (IRMA)	2
Israel (Israeli Singles Chart)	1
Italy (Musica e dischi)	1
Mexico (Notitas Musicales)	1
Netherlands (Dutch Top 40)	4
Netherlands (Single Top 100)	3
New Zealand (Recorded Music NZ)	3
Norway (VG-lista)	2
Peru (UPI)	4
Portugal (AFP)	6
Quebec (ADISQ)	3
Spain (AFYVE)	1
Sweden (Sverigetopplistan)	3
Switzerland (Schweizer Hitparade)	1
UK Singles (Official Charts)	1
UK Airplay (Music Week)	1
UK Club Chart (Music Week)	28
US Billboard Hot 100	2
US Adult Contemporary (Billboard)	22
US Alternative Airplay (Billboard)	17
US Maxi-Singles Sales (Billboard)	3
US Pop Airplay (Billboard)	1
US Rhythmic Airplay (Billboard)	4
US Cash Box Top 100	3
Zimbabwe (ZIMA)	3

Chart (2025)	Peak position
Poland (Polish Airplay Top 100)	64

=== Year-end charts ===
Chart (1993)	Rank
Australia (ARIA)	9
Austria (Ö3 Austria Top 40)	2
Belgium (Ultratop 50 Flanders)	13
Canada Top Singles (RPM)	23
Canada Dance/Urban (RPM)	9
Europe (Eurochart Hot 100)	4
Europe (European Hit Radio)	12
Germany (Media Control)	1
Iceland (Íslenski Listinn Topp 40)	5
Israel (Israeli Singles Chart)	3
Netherlands (Dutch Top 40)	4
Netherlands (Single Top 100)	7
New Zealand (RIANZ)	49
Sweden (Topplistan)	18
Switzerland (Schweizer Hitparade)	3
UK Singles (OCC)	3
UK Airplay (Music Week)	2
US Billboard Hot 100	51

Chart (1994)	Rank
Australia (ARIA)	67
New Zealand (RIANZ)	22
US Billboard Hot 100	9
US Cash Box Top 100	26

=== Decade-end charts ===
Chart (1990–99)	Rank
Austria (Ö3 Austria Top 40)	25
Netherlands (Dutch Top 40)	39
US Billboard Hot 100	70

== Certifications and sales ==
Region	Certification	Certified units/sales
Australia (ARIA)	2× Platinum	140,000^{^}
Austria (IFPI Austria)	Gold	25,000^{*}
Denmark (IFPI Danmark)	Gold	45,000^{‡}
France (SNEP)	Gold	250,000^{*}
Germany (BVMI)	3× Gold	855,000
Italy (FIMI)	Platinum	100,000^{‡}
Netherlands (NVPI)	Platinum	75,000^{^}
New Zealand (RMNZ)	Platinum	15,000^{*}
Spain (Promusicae)	Gold	30,000^{‡}
United Kingdom (BPI)	Platinum	771,323
United States (RIAA)	Platinum	1,300,000
Summaries
Worldwide	—	3,700,000
^{*} Sales figures based on certification alone.^{^} Shipments figures based on certification alone.^{‡} Sales+streaming figures based on certification alone.

== Cover versions and samples ==
An Italian band Age of Bass covered the song in 1993. Its close resemblance to the original Ace of Base version and the original band's name caused Mega Records alongside Polygram to prompt the rendition's record label Discomagic Italy into pulling the release from commercial markets. The rendition would later appear in a compilation release by Edel Records. In the same year, ZYX Music released a rendition performed by the German band Box of Laces.

Mexican band Caló covered the song in Spanish called Formas de amor in 1995.

Swedish band Grass Show covered the song on their 1997 debut album Something Smells Good in Stinkville.

American singer Britney Spears recorded her rendition of "All That She Wants", which sampled the chorus from the Ace of Base song for her 2007 album Blackout, but it failed to make the final cut, among other songs considered for the album. Spears' version features verses taken from her self-written poem "Remembrance of Who I Am", published on her official website in 2006. Ace of Base frontman Ulf Ekberg stated it was recorded in 2006 and never completed, while claiming it wasn't released due to the singer's hardships at the time. He praised her version, calling it "cool" and "very strong". The demo leaked onto the internet in 2008.

== See also ==
- List of number-one singles in Australia during the 1990s
- List of number-one hits of 1993 (Austria)
- List of Billboard Mainstream Top 40 number-one songs of the 1990s
- List of number-one singles of 1993 (Canada)
- List of number-one hits of 1993 (Germany)
- List of number-one hits of 1993 (Italy)
- List of number-one singles of 1993 (Spain)
- List of number-one singles of the 1990s (Switzerland)
- List of RPM number-one dance singles of 1993
- List of UK Singles Chart number ones of the 1990s
- VRT Top 30 number-one hits of 1993
