= Stella Getz =

Norwegian singer (born 1976)

- Born: 10 October 1976 (age 49); Nigeria
- Origin: Trondheim, Norway
- Genres: Eurodance, pop
- Years active: 1993–present
- Label: Mega Records

Stella Getz (born 10 October 1976) is a Norwegian singer. Born in Nigeria, she grew up in Trondheim. Her single, the Eurodance song "Friends" from 1993 became a big hit in Norway and other countries in Europe. The music video was often shown on MTV and she became popular especially in Germany. There, she toured with other artists such as Dr. Alban and 2 Unlimited. Her other singles were "Dr. Love", "Yeah Yeah", "All in All", and "Ta-di-di-boom". In 1994, her debut album, Forbidden Dreams was released. In 1995, Getz was engaged to the Norwegian popstar Espen Lind.
