= Chuck Eddy =

American music journalist (born 1960)

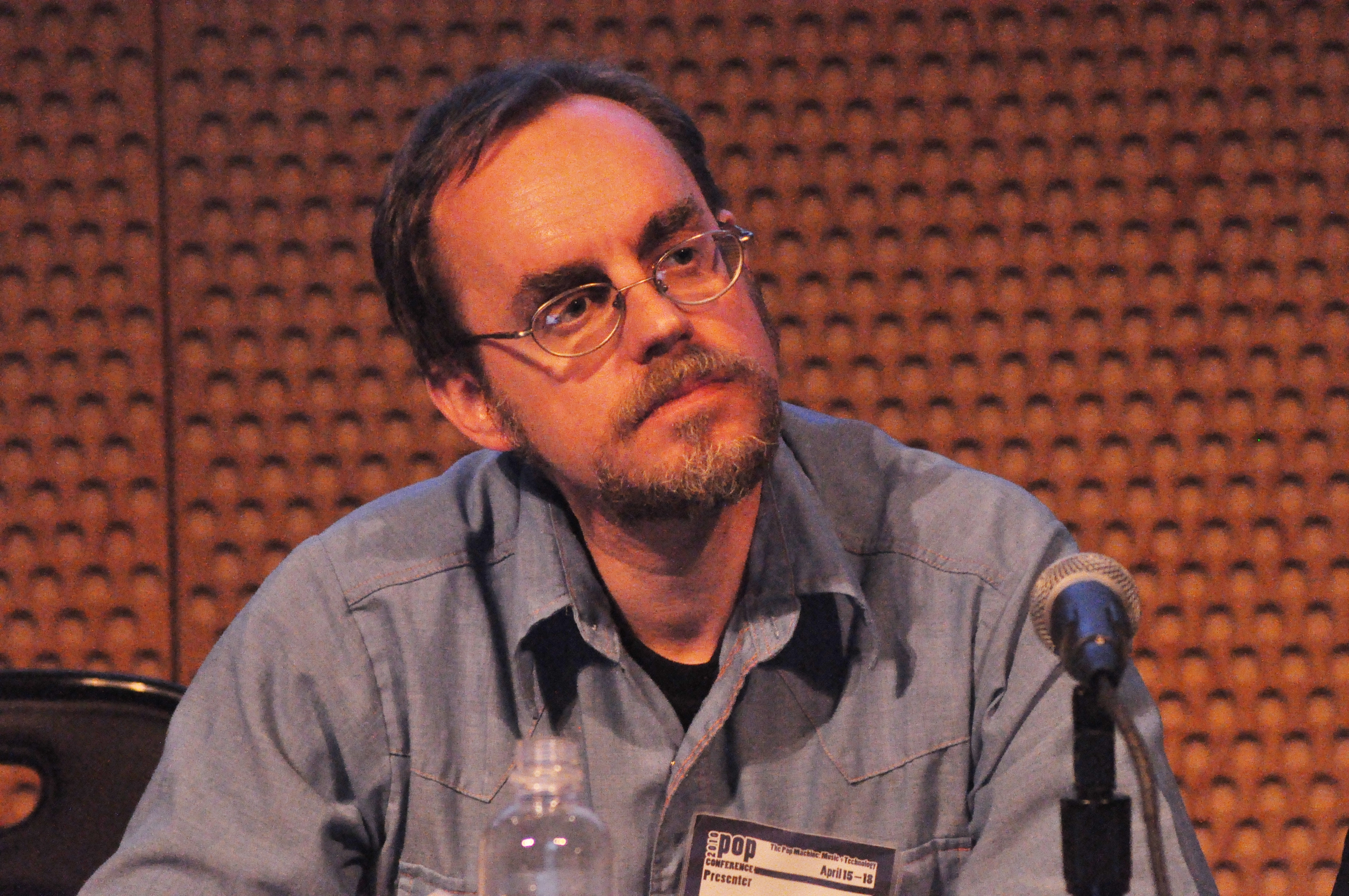
- Eddy in 2010
- Born: November 26, 1960 (age 65); Detroit, Michigan, U.S.
- Occupation: Music journalist
- Years active: Mid-1980s–present

Chuck Eddy (born November 26, 1960) is an American music journalist.

== Life and career ==
Chuck Eddy was born in Detroit, Michigan. After starting his journalism career with The Village Voice and Creem, where he published one of the first national interviews with the Beastie Boys in the mid-1980s, Eddy then wrote for Rolling Stone, Spin, Entertainment Weekly and other national and local publications. He has authored four books: Stairway to Hell: The 500 Best Heavy Metal Albums in the Universe, The Accidental Evolution of Rock and Roll, Rock and Roll Always Forgets: A Quarter Century of Music Criticism, and Terminated for Reasons of Taste: Other Ways to Hear Essential and Inessential Music.

In 1999 he was hired as the music editor at The Village Voice, where he served for seven years. After being terminated on grounds of "taste" upon Village Voice Media's merger with New Times in 2006, he briefly wrote a thrice-weekly heavy metal blog for MTV's URGE and a monthly page of capsule CD reviews in Harp called "The Last Roundup". From 2006 to 2007, he worked as a senior editor for Billboard magazine. Eddy currently freelances from Austin, Texas.

He has published book chapters in several anthologies, including The Rolling Stone Illustrated History of Rock and Roll (Random House, 1992); Spin Alternative Record Guide (Vintage, 1995); Stars Don’t Stand Still in the Sky: Music And Myth (NYU Press, 1999); Bubblegum Music Is the Naked Truth (Feral House, 2001); Creem: America’s Only Rock ‘N’ Roll Magazine (Collins, 2007); and 1000 Songs To Change Your Life (Time Out, 2008.)
