= Ulf Ekberg =

Swedish musician (born 1970)

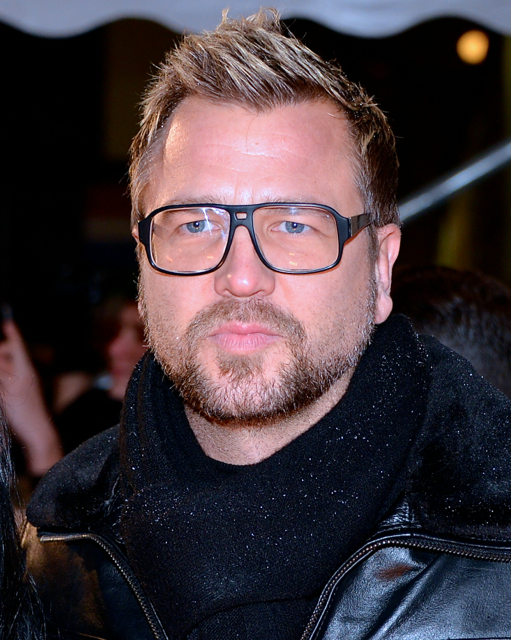
- Ekberg in 2012

Background information
- Also known as: Buddha
- Born: Ulf Gunnar Ekberg; 6 December 1970 (age 55); Gothenburg, Sweden
- Genre: Pop
- Occupations: Musician; songwriter; businessman; television producer; film producer
- Instruments: Keyboards; vocals
- Years active: 1983–present
- Member of: Ace of Base

Ulf Gunnar Ekberg (born 6 December 1970), also known as Buddha, is a Swedish musician, producer and songwriter best known as a founding member of the pop group Ace of Base, along with Jonas Berggren, Linn Berggren and Jenny Berggren.

== Career ==
Ace of Base released its debut album in 1992 and went on to attain major chart success throughout the 1990s. Ekberg played an integral part in the production of the Happy Nation album, co-writing nearly all of the album's tracks. Ekberg would continue to provide writing and production for the group's future works, notably the singles "Love in December" and "All for You".

In 2009, he started a new music production/publishing and management company together with Jonas Berggren based in LA, London and Stockholm.

After Ekberg experienced the tsunami in Phuket, Thailand, he founded the Surin Relief Fund to support affected children by providing facilities to educate children and care for orphaned children.

== Personal life ==
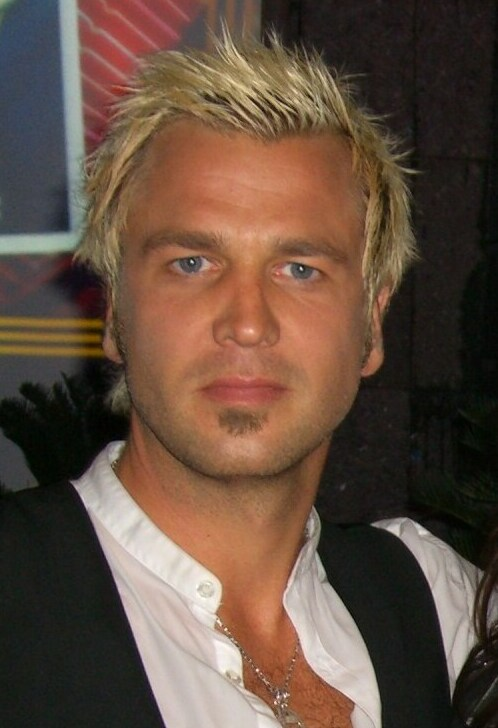
Ekberg in 2008

Ekberg dated the Swedish model/actress Emma Sjöberg from 1994 to 2000. Until summer 2010, Ekberg lived in London. He currently lives in Stockholm with his girlfriend Johanna Aybar and their three children.

On 27 March 1993, Expressen reported that Ekberg had once been a member of a band called Commit Suiside [sic], which was active in Gothenburg from 1984 to 1986, when Ulf was between the ages of 14 and 16. In 1998, the bootleg Swedish record label Flashback Records released Uffe was a Nazi!, an unauthorized, five-track compilation of what it claimed were Commit Suiside recordings. The songs contained explicitly violent and racist lyrics. A photo allegedly depicting Ekberg making a Nazi salute was used for the record's cover. Ekberg denied that Commit Suiside wrote or performed the racist songs released on Uffe was a Nazi!, and described the band as "a New Wave music band creating and performing electronic music on synthesizers without any political touch or agenda." Ekberg also denied ever being a member of the Sweden Democrats, a far-right political party founded in 1988.

Nonetheless, Ekberg has acknowledged being involved in neo-Nazi skinhead culture in his youth, and has repeatedly expressed regret for his views and actions during that part of his life. In the 1997 documentary Our Story, Ekberg said: "I told everyone I really regret what I've done. [...] I took the experience from it, I learned from it. But that life is not me. It's somebody else." In 2013, he said: "During the early 1990s I did dozens of interviews, all around the world, about the people I sometimes found myself surrounded by in the 1980s and how profoundly regretful I am now about associating with such individuals. Those interviews covered every aspect of my past, as I strove to be an open book to anyone who asked. [...] The teenage mistakes I did make in terms of my chosen ideas at the time were unfortunate and if I were to live through those days again I would have done things very differently! I'm truly deeply sorry for any hurt and disappointment this has caused for our fans, and I want to be very clear that Ace of Base never shared any of these opinions and strongly oppose all extremist opinions on both the right and left wing."

== Writing ==
Ekberg has written and produced the following songs:

=== With Jonas Berggren ===
- "Wheel of Fortune"
- "All That She Wants"
- "Young and Proud"
- "Living in Danger"
- "My Mind"
- "Dancer in Daydream"
- "Happy Nation"
- "Voulez-Vous Danser"
- "Waiting for Magic"
- "Münchhausen (Just Chaos)"
- "Blah, blah, blah on the Radio"
- "Southern California"
- "One Day"
- "Doreen"
- "Precious"
- "Black Sea"
- "Vision in Blue"
- "Who am I"
- "Told My Ma"

=== With Jonas, Jenny, & Malin Berggren ===
- "Hear Me Calling"
- "Love In December"
- "Change With the Light"

=== With StoneStream & John Ballard ===
- "Qué Será"
- "Perfect World"
- "Edge of Heaven"
- "Look Around Me" (Unreleased)
- "Angel of Love" (Unreleased)

=== With John Ballard ===
- "Mercy Mercy"
- "I Pray"
- "Don't Go Away"

=== With Jonas Berggen & Jonas Saeed ===
- "All For You"
- "The Golden Ratio"

=== With Jonas Berggren, Ari Lehtonen and D. Massy ===
- "Mr Replay"

== Vocals ==
Ekberg has contributes vocals to the following songs:

- "All That She Wants"
- "Wheel of Fortune"
- "Living in Danger"
- "My Mind"
- "Happy Nation"
- "Don't Turn Around"
- "Waiting for Magic"
- "Fashion Party"
- "Münchhausen (Just Chaos)"
- "Hear Me Calling"
- "Perfect World"
- "I Pray"
- "Change With the Light"
- "All For You"
- "Mr Replay"
- "Prime Time"
- "Look Around Me"
- "Angel of Love"

== Other activities ==
Ulf Ekberg has been serving on the Advisory Board of the Stockholm Culture Awards, an international arts and culture distinction founded in 1983.
