= List of UK top-ten singles in 1994 =

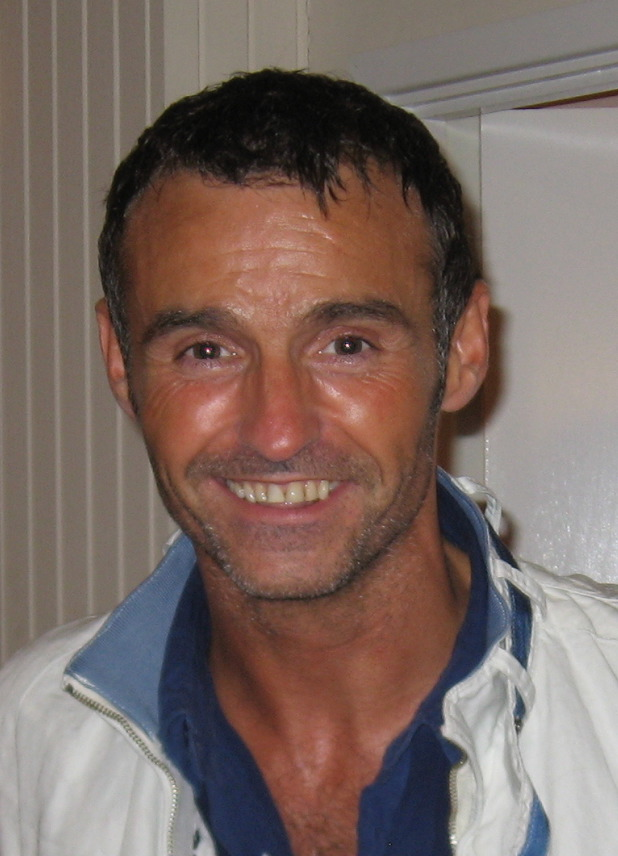
Marti Pellow and his band Wet Wet Wet had the best selling single of 1994 with "Love Is All Around", which spent fifteen consecutive weeks at number-one and 20 weeks in the top 10 altogether.

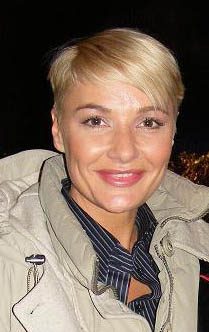
Danish singer Whigfield (pictured in 2009) had the second best selling single of this year with "Saturday Night", which spent four weeks at the top of the chart.

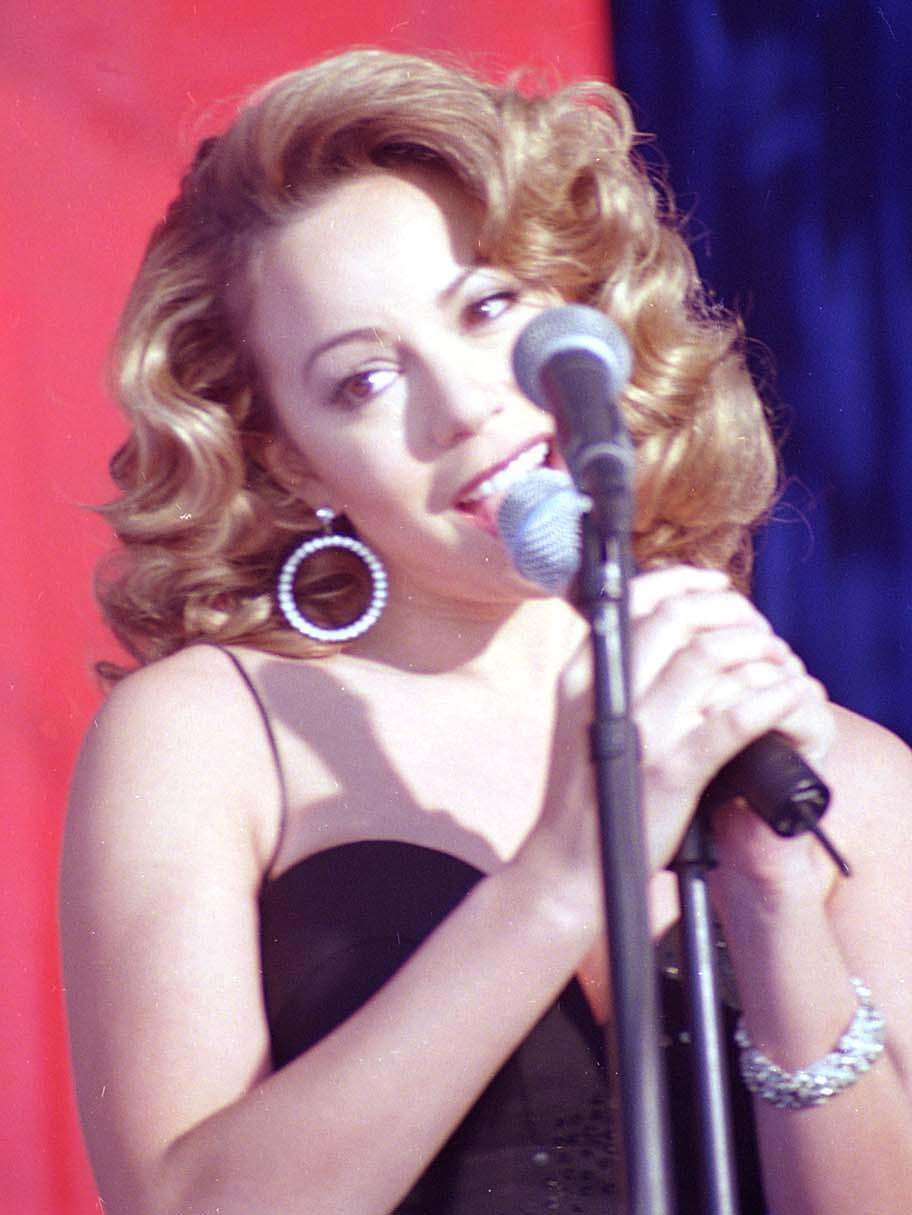
Mariah Carey had four UK top 10 singles in 1994. These included her cover version of "Without You", which topped the chart for four weeks, as well as her Christmas classic "All I Want for Christmas Is You", which spent three weeks at number two. "All I Want for Christmas Is You" would finally reach number-one in the UK charts in December 2020, exactly 26 years after its initial release.

The UK Singles Chart is one of many music charts compiled by the Official Charts Company that calculates the best-selling singles of the week in the United Kingdom. Before 2004, the chart was only based on the sales of physical singles. This list shows singles that peaked in the Top 10 of the UK Singles Chart during 1994, as well as singles which peaked in 1993 and 1995 but were in the top 10 in 1994. The entry date is when the single appeared in the top 10 for the first time (week ending, as published by the Official Charts Company, which is six days after the chart is announced).

One-hundred and thirty-two singles were in the top ten in 1994. Nine singles from 1993 remained in the top 10 for several weeks at the beginning of the year, while "Another Day" by Whigfield, "Cotton Eye Joe" by Rednex, "Love Me for a Reason" by Boyzone, "Them Girls, Them Girls" by Zig and Zag and "Think Twice" by Celine Dion were all released in 1994 but did not reach their peak until 1995. "Twist and Shout" by Chaka Demus & Pliers, "The Perfect Year" by Dina Carroll and "It's Alright" by East 17 were the singles from 1993 to reach its peak in 1994. Twenty-five artists scored multiple entries in the top 10 in 1994. Boyzone, Oasis, R. Kelly, Red Hot Chili Peppers and Toni Braxton were among the many artists who achieved their first UK charting top 10 single in 1994.

The 1993 Christmas number-one, "Mr Blobby" by Mr Blobby, remained at number-one for the first week of 1994. The first new number-one single of the year was "Twist and Shout" by Chaka Demus & Pliers featuring Jack Radics and Taxi Gang. Overall, fifteen different singles peaked at number-one in 1994, with Take That (2) having the most singles hit that position.

== Background ==
=== Multiple entries ===
One-hundred and thirty-two singles charted in the top 10 in 1994, with one-hundred and twenty-one singles reaching their peak this year.

Twenty-five artists scored multiple entries in the top 10 in 1994. American singer Mariah Carey, East 17 and British boy-band Take That shared the record for the most top ten singles in 1994 with four hit singles each. Carey's cover of the Badfinger song "Without You" was her biggest hit of the year; it reached number-one in February and spent four weeks in that position, and eight weeks in the top 10 in total. Her other top ten singles were "All I Want for Christmas Is You" (number 2) in December; "Endless Love" (3) with Luther Vandross in September; and "Anytime You Need a Friend" (8) in June. Three of Take That's four top ten singles reached number-one in the UK: "Babe" in December 1993, "Everything Changes" in April and "Sure" in October. "Love Ain't Here Anymore" was their other top 10 entry, which reached number 3 in July. East 17 also had a number-one single in 1994, "Stay Another Day", which stayed there for 5 of its 8 weeks in the top ten. Their other top ten singles were "Around the World" and "It's Alright (both number 3) and "Steam" (number 7). Bon Jovi, Oasis and Eternal had three singles in the top ten in 1994.

D:Ream were one of a number of artists with two top-ten entries, including the number-one single "Things Can Only Get Better". Ace of Base, Celine Dion, Haddaway, Meat Loaf and Tori Amos were among the other artists who had multiple top 10 entries in 1994.

=== Chart debuts ===
Sixty-four artists achieved their first top 10 single in 1994, either as a lead or featured artist. Of these, seven went on to record another hit single that year: C. J. Lewis, D:Ream, The Mad Stuntman, Maxx, Reel 2 Real, Tori Amos and Whigfield. Oasis had two other entries in their breakthrough year.

The following table (collapsed on desktop site) does not include acts who had previously charted as part of a group and secured their first top 10 solo single.

Artist	Number of top 10s	First entry	Chart position	Other entries				
K7	1	"Come Baby Come"	3	—				
D:Ream	2	"Things Can Only Get Better"	1	"U R the Best Thing (Remix)" (4)				
Tori Amos	2	"Cornflake Girl"	4	"Pretty Good Year" (7)				
Toni Braxton	1	"Breathe Again"	2	—				
Red Hot Chili Peppers	1	"Give It Away"	9	—				
Wendy Moten	1	"Come In Out of the Rain"	8	—				
Reel 2 Real	2	"I Like to Move It"	5	"Go On Move" (7)				
The Mad Stuntman	2	"I Like to Move It"	5	"Go On Move" (7)				
Deep Forest	1	"Sweet Lullaby"	10	—				
RuPaul	1	"Don't Go Breaking My Heart"	7	—				
Doop	1	"Doop"	1	—				
Primal Scream	1	"Rocks"/"Funky Jam"	7	—				
Degrees of Motion	1	"Shine On"	8	—				
Biti	1	"Shine On"	8	—				
Tony Di Bart	1	"The Real Thing"	1	—				
Crash Test Dummies	1	"Mmm Mmm Mmm Mmm"	2	—				
C. J. Lewis	2	"Sweets for My Sweet"	3	"Everything Is Alright (Uptight)" (10)				
Stiltskin	1	"Inside"	1	—				
Club House	1	"Light My Fire (Remix)"	7	—				
Carl	1	"Light My Fire (Remix)"	7	—				
Manchester United Football Squad	1	"Come on You Reds"	1	—				
Bad Boys Inc	1	"More to This World"	8	—				
Maxx	2	"Get-A-Way"	4	"No More (I Can't Stand It)" (8)				
Big Mountain	1	"Baby, I Love Your Way"	2	—				
Gloworm	1	"Carry Me Home"	9	—				
Absolutely Fabulous	1	"Absolutely Fabulous"	6	—				
Dawn Penn	1	"You Don't Love Me (No, No, No)"	3	—				
The Grid	1	"Swamp Thing"	3	—				
All-4-One	1	"I Swear"	2	—				
GUN	1	"Word Up!"	8	—				
2 Cowboys	1	"Everybody Gonfi-Gon"	7	—				
Let Loose	1	"Crazy for You"	2	—				
Warren G	1	"Regulate"	5	—				
Nate Dogg	1	"Regulate"	5	—				
China Black	1	"Searching"	4	—				
PJ & Duncan	1	"Let's Get Ready to Rhumble"	9	—				
Red Dragon	1	"Compliments on Your Kiss"	2	—				
Brian and Tony Gold	1	"Compliments on Your Kiss"	2	—				
DJ Miko	1	"Compliments on Your Kiss"	2	—	1	"What's Up?"	6	—
Youssou N'Dour	1	"7 Seconds"	3	—				
Oasis	3	"Live Forever"	10	"Cigarettes & Alcohol" (7), "Whatever" (3)				
Tinman	1	"Eighteen Strings"	9	—				
Corona	1	"The Rhythm of the Night"	2	—				
Whigfield	2	"Saturday Night"	1	"Another Day" (7) ^{[A]}				
M-Beat	1	"Incredible"	8	—				
General Levy	1	"Incredible"	8	—				
Lisa Loeb	1	"Stay (I Missed You)"	6	—				
Nine Stories	1	"Stay (I Missed You)"	6	—				
Pato Banton	1	"Baby Come Back"	1	—				
Michelle Gayle	1	"Sweetness"	4	—				
Summer	1	"Welcome to Tomorrow (Are You Ready?)"	6	—				
R. Kelly	1	"She's Got That Vibe"	3	—				
Ultimate Kaos	1	"Some Girls"	9	—				
M.C. Sar	1	"Another Night"	2	—				
Real McCoy	1	"Another Night"	2	—				
Sheryl Crow	1	"All I Wanna Do"	4	—				
Baby D	1	"Let Me Be Your Fantasy"	1	—				
Pearl Jam	1	"Spin the Black Circle"	10	—				
Boyzone	1	"Love Me for a Reason" ^{[B]}	2	—				
Mighty Morphin Power Rangers	1	"Power Rangers"	3	—				
Aaron Waters	1	"Power Rangers"	3	—				
Rednex	1	"Cotton Eye Joe" ^{[C]}	1	—				
Zig and Zag	1	"Them Girls, Them Girls" ^{[D]}	5	—				

Notes

Sting recorded his first top 10 single away from The Police, the collaboration with Bryan Adams and Rod Stewart, "All for Love", peaking at number two. He also had a solo single in 1994, "When We Dance", which made number nine. The B-52's (best known for their 1990 hit "Love Shack") appeared on the single "(We're) The Flintstones" under the name The B. C. 52's.

Absolutely Fabulous was a pseudonym used by the highly successful Pet Shop Boys to produce a song of the same name in aid of Comic Relief. Ali and Robin Campbell from the group UB40 guested on Pato Banton's cover of Baby Come Back, their first hit single away from the band.

=== Songs from films ===
Original songs from various films entered the top 10 throughout the year. These included "All for Love" (from The Three Musketeers), "A Deeper Love" (Sister Act 2: Back In The Habit), "Streets of Philadelphia" (Philadelphia), "Mmm Mmm Mmm Mmm" (Dumb and Dumber), "Love Is All Around" (Four Weddings and A Funeral), "Baby, I Love Your Way" (Reality Bites), "(Meet) The Flintstones" (The Flintstones), "Regulate" (Above The Rim) and "We Have All the Time in the World" (Good Morning, Vietnam).

=== Charity singles ===
The Comic Relief single this year was performed by the Pet Shop Boys, who used the name Absolutely Fabulous for the single of the same name, which included lines of dialogue from the TV series. It peaked at number six on 18 June 1994 (week ending).

=== Best-selling singles ===
Wet Wet Wet had the biggest-selling single of 1994 with "Love Is All Around", which spent twenty weeks in the top ten (including fifteen weeks at number-one), sold over 1.783 million copies and was certified 2× platinum by the BPI. "Saturday Night" by Whigfield came in second place. East 17's "Stay Another Day", "Baby Come Back" from Pato Banton featuring Ali and Robin Campbell and "I Swear" by All-4-One made up the top five. Singles by Bon Jovi, Mariah Carey, Let Loose, Doop and Ace of Base were also in the top ten best-selling singles of the year.

"Love is All Around" (3) ranked in the top 10 best-selling singles of the decade. It also stands as the tenth biggest-selling single of all time in the UK.

== Top-ten singles ==
Key

Symbol	Meaning
‡	Single peaked in 1993 but still in chart in 1994.
♦	Single released in 1994 but peaked in 1995.
(#)	Year-end top-ten single position and rank
Entered	The date that the single first appeared in the chart.
Peak	Highest position that the single reached in the UK Singles Chart.

Entered (week ending)	Weeks in top 10	Single	Artist	Peak	Peak reached (week ending)	Weeks at peak
Singles in 1993
9 October 1993	14	"I'd Do Anything for Love (But I Won't Do That)" ‡	Meat Loaf	1	23 October 1993	7
20 November 1993	7	"True Love" ‡	Elton John & Kiki Dee	2	27 November 1993	2
4 December 1993	7	"Mr Blobby" ‡	Mr Blobby	1	11 December 1993	3
11 December 1993	6	"For Whom the Bell Tolls" ‡	Bee Gees	4	25 December 1993	2
11 December 1993	7	"It's Alright"	East 17	3	15 January 1994	1
18 December 1993	5	"Babe" ‡	Take That	1	18 December 1993	1
18 December 1993	7	"Twist and Shout"	Chaka Demus & Pliers featuring Jack Radics & Taxi Gang	1	8 January 1994	2
18 December 1993	5	"The Perfect Year"	Dina Carroll	5	8 January 1994	1
25 December 1993	3	"Bat Out of Hell" ‡	Meat Loaf	8	25 December 1993	2
Singles in 1994
1 January 1994	7	"Come Baby Come"	K7	3	22 January 1994	2
8 January 1994	9	"Things Can Only Get Better" ^{[E]}	D:Ream	1	22 January 1994	4
15 January 1994	4	"Anything"	Culture Beat	5	15 January 1994	2
15 January 1994	8	"All for Love"	Bryan Adams, Rod Stewart & Sting	2	29 January 1994	1
22 January 1994	3	"Cornflake Girl"	Tori Amos	4	29 January 1994	1
22 January 1994	1	"Save Our Love"	Eternal	8	22 January 1994	1
22 January 1994	3	"I Miss You"	Haddaway	9	22 January 1994	1
22 January 1994	1	"Here I Stand"	Bitty McLean	10	22 January 1994	1
29 January 1994	8	"Breathe Again"	Toni Braxton	2	5 February 1994	2
29 January 1994	1	"In Your Room"	Depeche Mode	8	29 January 1994	1
29 January 1994	8	"Return to Innocence"	Enigma	3	12 February 1994	2
5 February 1994	4	"The Power of Love"	Celine Dion	4	12 February 1994	1
5 February 1994	1	"Give It Away"	Red Hot Chili Peppers	9	5 February 1994	1
12 February 1994	2	"A Deeper Love"	Aretha Franklin	5	12 February 1994	1
12 February 1994	1	"Come In Out of the Rain"	Wendy Moten	8	12 February 1994	1
12 February 1994	11	"I Like to Move It" ^{[F]}	Reel 2 Real featuring The Mad Stuntman	5	2 April 1994	1
12 February 1994	1	"Sweet Lullaby"	Deep Forest	10	12 February 1994	1
19 February 1994	8	"Without You" (#7)	Mariah Carey	1	19 February 1994	4
19 February 1994	3	"Move on Baby"	Cappella	7	19 February 1994	1
19 February 1994	4	"Let the Beat Control Your Body"	2 Unlimited	6	5 March 1994	1
26 February 1994	2	"Stay Together"	Suede	3	26 February 1994	1
26 February 1994	9	"The Sign" (#10)	Ace of Base	2	5 March 1994	3
5 March 1994	1	"Don't Go Breaking My Heart" ^{[G]}	Elton John & RuPaul	7	5 March 1994	1
12 March 1994	6	"Doop" (#9)	Doop	1	19 March 1994	3
12 March 1994	2	"Renaissance"	M People	5	12 March 1994	1
12 March 1994	1	"Rocks"/"Funky Jam"	Primal Scream	7	12 March 1994	1
12 March 1994	1	"The More You Ignore Me, the Closer I Get"	Morrissey	8	12 March 1994	1
19 March 1994	7	"Streets of Philadelphia"	Bruce Springsteen	2	2 April 1994	1
19 March 1994	2	"Girls & Boys"	Blur	5	19 March 1994	1
19 March 1994	1	"Pretty Good Year"	Tori Amos	7	19 March 1994	1
26 March 1994	4	"U R The Best Thing (Remix)" ^{[H]}	D:Ream	4	2 April 1994	1
26 March 1994	3	"Whatta Man"	Salt-N-Pepa with En Vogue	7	2 April 1994	1
26 March 1994	2	"Shine On"	Degrees of Motion featuring Biti	8	2 April 1994	1
26 March 1994	2	"Dry County"	Bon Jovi	9	2 April 1994	1
2 April 1994	3	"I'll Remember"	Madonna	7	9 April 1994	1
9 April 1994	4	"Everything Changes"	Take That	1	9 April 1994	2
9 April 1994	6	"The Most Beautiful Girl in the World"	Prince	1	23 April 1994	2
16 April 1994	6	"The Real Thing"	Tony Di Bart	1	7 May 1994	1
16 April 1994	2	"Rock My Heart"	Haddaway	9	16 April 1994	2
23 April 1994	4	"Always"	Erasure	4	23 April 1994	2
23 April 1994	5	"Mmm Mmm Mmm Mmm"	Crash Test Dummies	2	30 April 1994	1
23 April 1994	3	"Dedicated to the One I Love"	Bitty McLean	6	30 April 1994	1
30 April 1994	6	"Sweets for My Sweet"	C. J. Lewis	3	7 May 1994	1
30 April 1994	1	"I'll Stand by You"	The Pretenders	10	30 April 1994	1
7 May 1994	6	"Inside"	Stiltskin	1	14 May 1994	1
7 May 1994	2	"Light My Fire (Remix)" ^{[I]}	Club House featuring Carl	7	7 May 1994	1
7 May 1994	7	"Come on You Reds" ^{[J]}^{[K]}	Manchester United Football Squad	1	21 May 1994	2
14 May 1994	5	"Around the World"	East 17	3	21 May 1994	2
14 May 1994	3	"Just a Step from Heaven"	Eternal	8	21 May 1994	1
21 May 1994	20	"Love Is All Around" (#1)	Wet Wet Wet	1	4 June 1994	15
21 May 1994	3	"The Real Thing"	2 Unlimited	6	28 May 1994	1
21 May 1994	2	"More to This World"	Bad Boys Inc	8	28 May 1994	1
28 May 1994	5	"Get-A-Way"	Maxx	4	4 June 1994	2
28 May 1994	6	"No Good (Start the Dance)"	The Prodigy	4	18 June 1994	1
4 June 1994	7	"Baby, I Love Your Way"	Big Mountain	2	11 June 1994	3
4 June 1994	1	"Carry Me Home"	Gloworm	9	4 June 1994	1
11 June 1994	3	"Absolutely Fabulous" ^{[L]}	Absolutely Fabulous ^{[M]}	6	18 June 1994	1
11 June 1994	5	"You Don't Love Me (No, No, No)"	Dawn Penn	3	18 June 1994	2
11 June 1994	1	"Since I Don't Have You"	Guns N' Roses	10	11 June 1994	1
18 June 1994	3	"Don't Turn Around"	Ace of Base	5	25 June 1994	1
18 June 1994	8	"Swamp Thing"	The Grid	3	2 July 1994	1
18 June 1994	2	"Anytime You Need a Friend"	Mariah Carey	8	25 June 1994	1
25 June 1994	12	"I Swear" (#5)	All-4-One	2	2 July 1994	7
2 July 1994	2	"Go On Move"	Reel 2 Real featuring The Mad Stuntman	7	2 July 1994	2
2 July 1994	6	"Shine"	Aswad	5	23 July 1994	1
2 July 1994	1	"U & Me"	Cappella	10	2 July 1994	1
9 July 1994	3	"Love Ain't Here Anymore"	Take That	3	9 July 1994	2
9 July 1994	7	"(Meet) The Flintstones"	The B.C. 52s ^{[N]}	3	23 July 1994	3
9 July 1994	2	"Word Up!"	GUN	8	9 July 1994	1
16 July 1994	2	"Everybody Gonfi-Gon"	2 Cowboys	7	16 July 1994	1
16 July 1994	9	"Crazy for You" (#8) ^{[O]}	Let Loose	2	20 August 1994	2
23 July 1994	8	"Regulate"	Warren G & Nate Dogg	5	30 July 1994	1
23 July 1994	2	"Everything is Alright (Uptight)"	C. J. Lewis	10	23 July 1994	2
30 July 1994	1	"Run to the Sun"	Erasure	6	30 July 1994	1
30 July 1994	7	"Searching"	China Black	4	13 August 1994	2
6 August 1994	4	"Let's Get Ready to Rhumble"	PJ & Duncan	9	6 August 1994	2
6 August 1994	2	"No More (I Can't Stand It)"	Maxx	8	13 August 1994	1
13 August 1994	6	"Compliments on Your Kiss"	Red Dragon with Brian and Tony Gold	2	3 September 1994	1
13 August 1994	4	"What's Up?" ^{[P]}	DJ Miko	6	20 August 1994	1
20 August 1994	6	"7 Seconds"	Youssou N'Dour featuring Neneh Cherry	3	10 September 1994	1
20 August 1994	2	"Live Forever"	Oasis	10	20 August 1994	2
27 August 1994	1	"Eighteen Strings"	Tinman	9	27 August 1994	1
3 September 1994	5	"I'll Make Love to You"	Boyz II Men	5	10 September 1994	1
3 September 1994	1	"Parklife"	Blur featuring Phil Daniels	10	3 September 1994	1
10 September 1994	3	"Confide in Me"	Kylie Minogue	2	10 September 1994	1
10 September 1994	6	"The Rhythm of the Night"	Corona	2	24 September 1994	2
17 September 1994	10	"Saturday Night" (#2)	Whigfield	1	17 September 1994	4
17 September 1994	4	"Endless Love"	Luther Vandross & Mariah Carey	3	17 September 1994	2
17 September 1994	2	"What's the Frequency, Kenneth?"	R.E.M.	9	17 September 1994	1
17 September 1994	3	"Incredible"	M-Beat featuring General Levy	8	24 September 1994	1
24 September 1994	11	"Always" (#6)	Bon Jovi	2	8 October 1994	3
1 October 1994	6	"Hey Now (Girls Just Want to Have Fun)" ^{[Q]}	Cyndi Lauper	4	8 October 1994	1
1 October 1994	6	"Stay (I Missed You)"	Lisa Loeb & Nine Stories	6	1 October 1994	1
1 October 1994	3	"Steam"	East 17	7	1 October 1994	2
8 October 1994	2	"Secret"	Madonna	5	8 October 1994	1
8 October 1994	10	"Baby Come Back" (#4)	Pato Banton featuring Ali & Robin Campbell	1	29 October 1994	4
8 October 1994	6	"Sweetness"	Michelle Gayle	4	5 November 1994	1
15 October 1994	3	"Sure"	Take That	1	15 October 1994	2
22 October 1994	1	"Cigarettes & Alcohol"	Oasis	7	22 October 1994	1
22 October 1994	4	"Welcome to Tomorrow (Are You Ready?)"	Snap! featuring Summer	6	5 November 1994	1
22 October 1994	5	"She's Got That Vibe"	R. Kelly & Public Announcement	3	12 November 1994	1
29 October 1994	1	"When We Dance"	Sting	9	29 October 1994	1
5 November 1994	4	"Oh Baby I..."	Eternal	4	12 November 1994	1
5 November 1994	2	"Some Girls"	Ultimate Kaos	9	5 November 1994	1
12 November 1994	5	"Another Night"	M.C. Sar & Real McCoy	2	19 November 1994	1
12 November 1994	4	"All I Wanna Do"	Sheryl Crow	4	26 November 1994	1
19 November 1994	5	"Let Me Be Your Fantasy"	Baby D	1	26 November 1994	2
19 November 1994	3	"Sight for Sore Eyes"	M People	6	26 November 1994	1
19 November 1994	1	"True Faith '94"	New Order	9	19 November 1994	1
26 November 1994	6	"We Have All the Time in the World" ^{[R]}	Louis Armstrong	3	3 December 1994	2
26 November 1994	7	"Crocodile Shoes"	Jimmy Nail	4	10 December 1994	1
26 November 1994	1	"Spin the Black Circle"	Pearl Jam	10	26 November 1994	1
3 December 1994	2	"Love Spreads"	The Stone Roses	2	3 December 1994	1
3 December 1994	8	"Stay Another Day" (#3)	East 17	1	10 December 1994	5
10 December 1994	5	"All I Want for Christmas Is You"	Mariah Carey	2	17 December 1994	3
10 December 1994	17	"Think Twice" ♦	Celine Dion	1	4 February 1995	7
10 December 1994	8	"Love Me for a Reason" ♦	Boyzone	2	7 January 1995	1
17 December 1994	3	"Power Rangers" ^{[S]}	Mighty Morphin Power Rangers (Aaron Waters) ^{[T]}	3	17 December 1994	1
17 December 1994	2	"Please Come Home for Christmas"	Bon Jovi	7	17 December 1994	1
17 December 1994	2	"Another Day" ♦ ^{[U]}	Whigfield	7	7 January 1995	1
24 December 1994	10	"Cotton Eye Joe" ♦	Rednex	1	14 January 1995	3
24 December 1994	4	"Them Girls, Them Girls" ♦	Zig and Zag ^{[V]}	5	7 January 1995	1
31 December 1994	4	"Whatever"	Oasis	3	31 December 1994	1

== Entries by artist ==
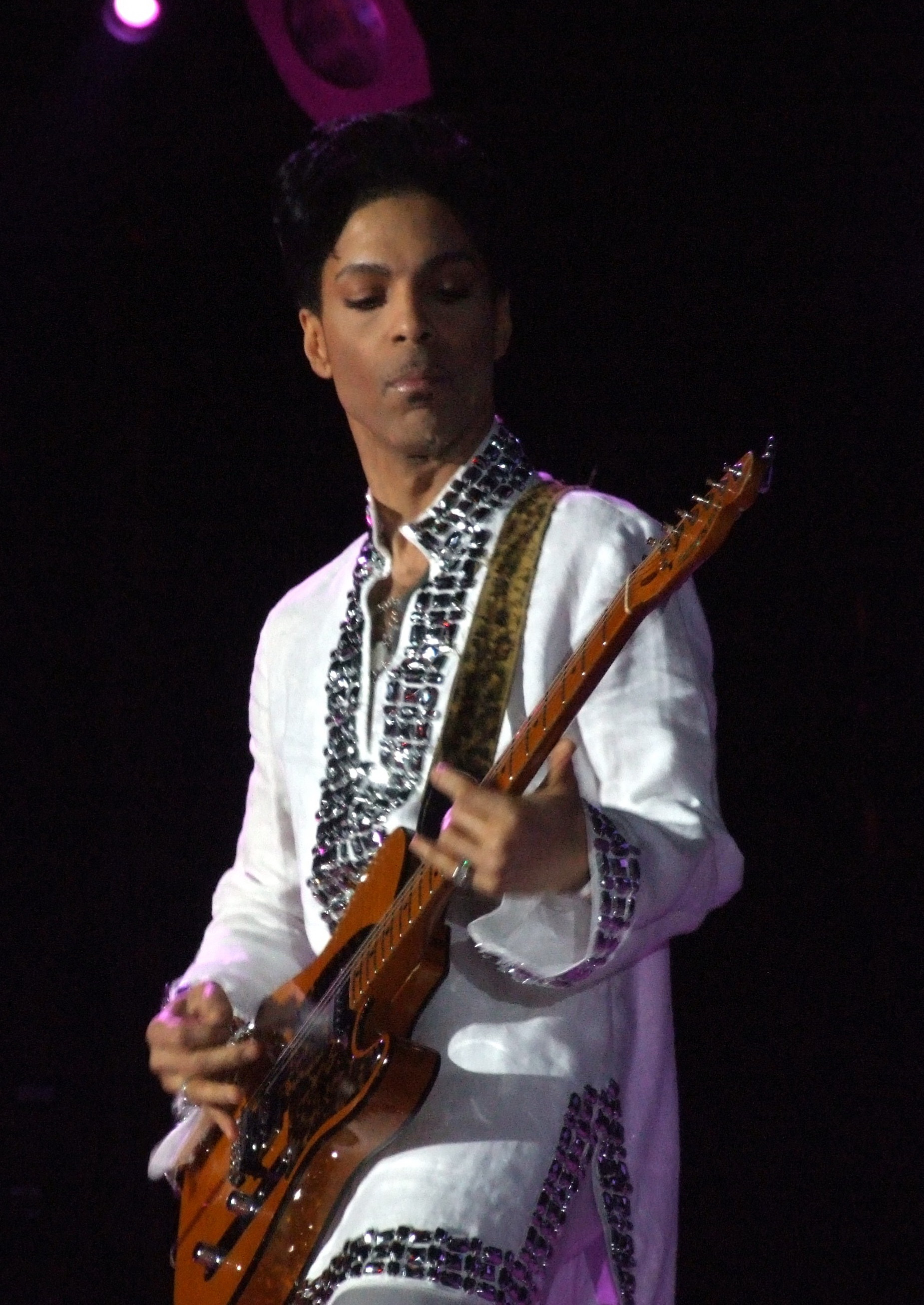
Prince scored his only UK number-one single in April with The Most Beautiful Girl in the World.

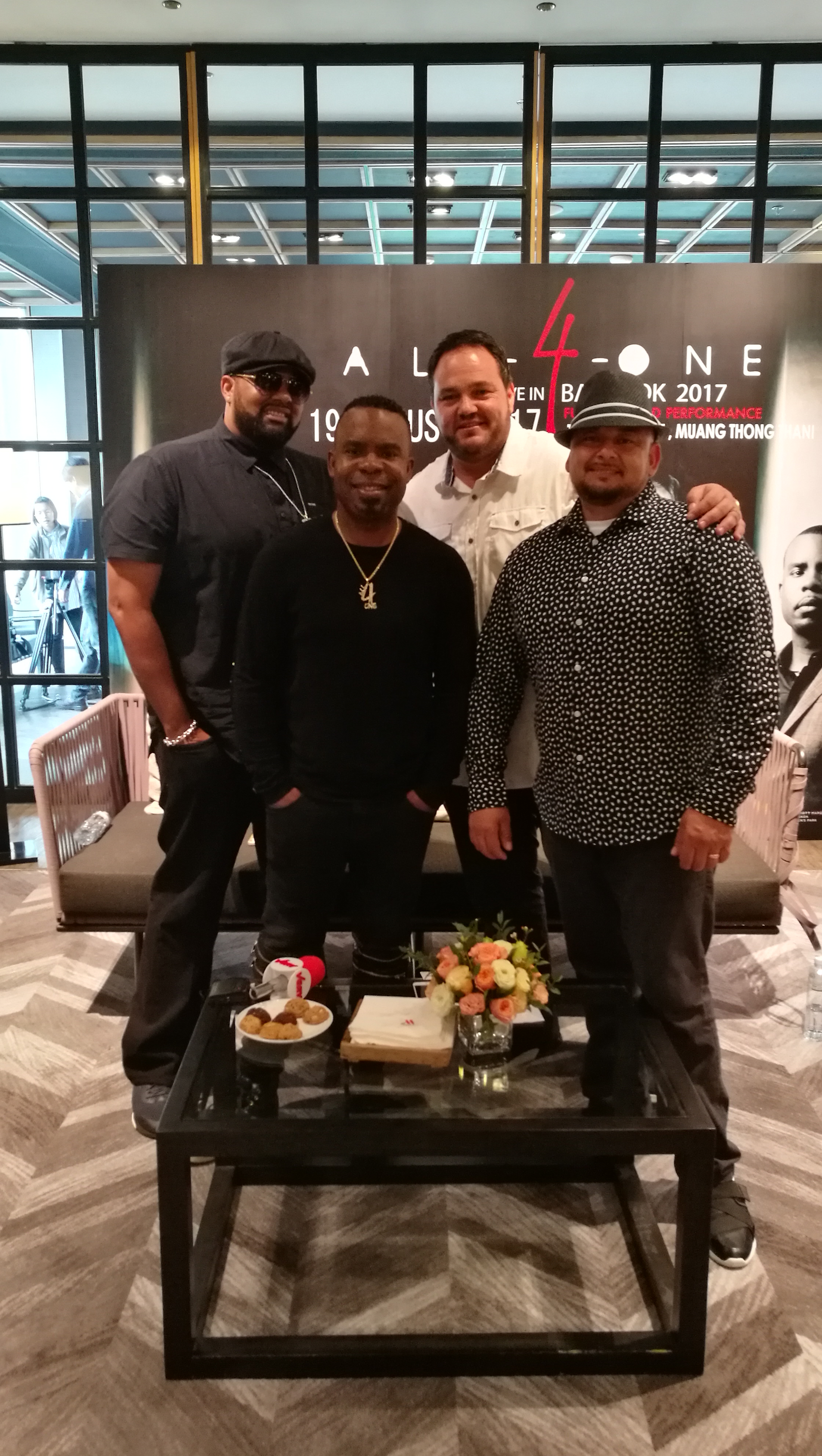
All-4-One spent seven consecutive weeks at number two in 1994 with "I Swear", which lasted 12 weeks in the top 10 altogether.

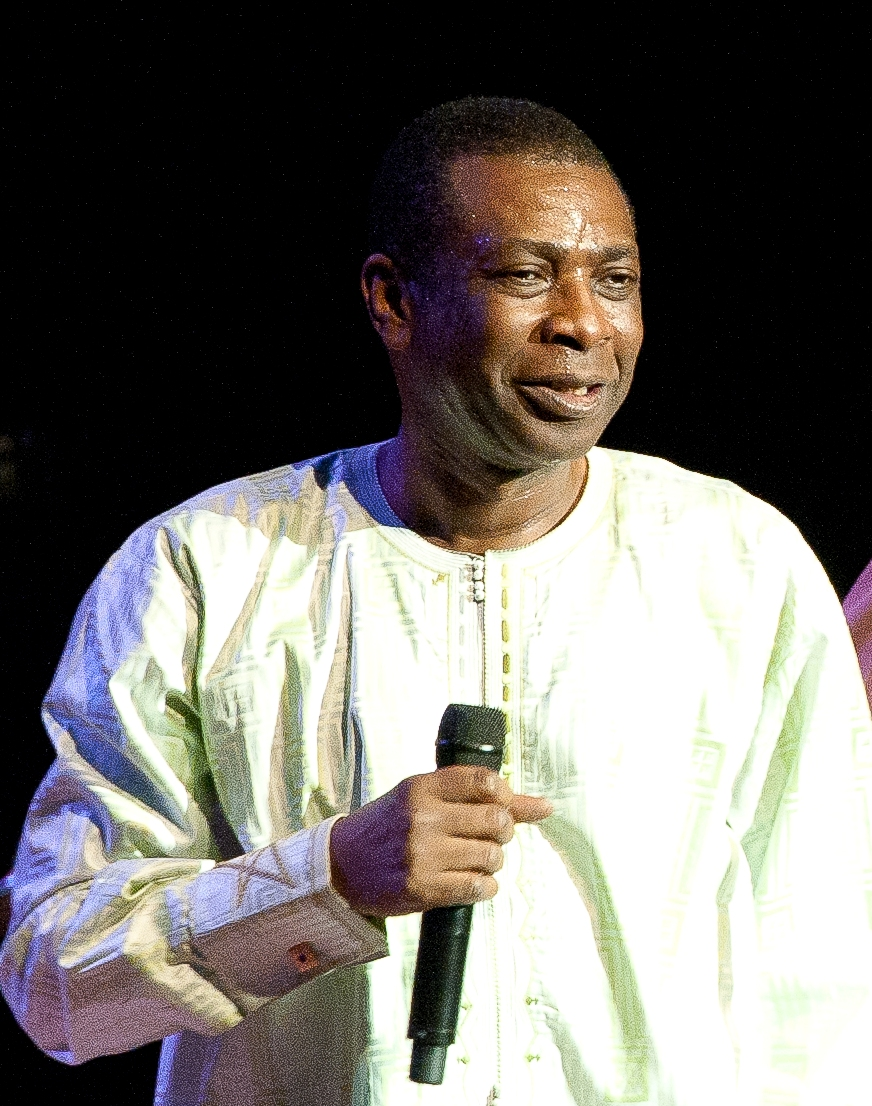
Youssou N'Dour achieved his only UK top 10 single this year with "7 Seconds", a duet with Swedish singer Neneh Cherry, which peaked at number three.

The following table shows artists who achieved two or more top 10 entries in 1994, including singles that reached their peak in 1993 or 1995. The figures include both main artists and featured artists, while appearances on ensemble charity records are also counted for each artist.

Entries	Artist	Weeks	Singles
4	East 17 ^{[W]}	20	"Around the World", "It's Alright", "Stay Another Day", "Steam"
4	Mariah Carey	18	"All I Want for Christmas Is You", "Anytime You Need a Friend", "Endless Love", "Without You"
4	Take That ^{[X]}	13	"Babe", "Everything Changes", "Love Ain't Here Anymore", "Sure"
3	Bon Jovi	15	"Always", "Dry County", "Please Come Home for Christmas"
3	Eternal	8	"Just a Step from Heaven", "Oh Baby I...", "Save Our Love"
3	Oasis	4	"Cigarettes & Alcohol", "Live Forever", "Whatever"
2	2 Unlimited	7	"Let the Beat Control Your Body", "The Real Thing"
2	Ace of Base	12	"Don't Turn Around", "The Sign"
2	Bitty McLean	4	"Dedicated to the One I Love", "Here I Stand"
2	Blur	3	"Girls & Boys", "Parklife"
2	Cappella	4	"Move on Baby", "U & Me"
2	Celine Dion ^{[Y]}	8	"The Power of Love", "Think Twice"
2	C. J. Lewis	8	"Everything is Alright (Uptight)", "Sweets for My Sweet"
2	D:Ream	13	"Things Can Only Get Better", "U R the Best Thing (Remix)"
2	Elton John ^{[X]}	2	"Don't Go Breaking My Heart", "True Love"
2	Erasure	5	"Always", "Run to the Sun"
2	Haddaway	5	"I Miss You", "Rock My Heart"
2	The Mad Stuntman ^{[Z]}	13	"Go On Move", "I Like to Move It"
2	Madonna	5	"I'll Remember", "Secret"
2	Maxx	7	"Get-A-Way", "No More (I Can't Stand It)"
2	Meat Loaf ^{[X]}	4	"Bat Out of Hell", "I'd Do Anything for Love (But I Won't Do That)"
2	M People	5	"Renaissance", "Sight for Sore Eyes"
2	Reel 2 Real	13	"Go On Move", "I Like to Move It"
2	Sting	9	"All for Love", "When We Dance"
2	Tori Amos	4	"Cornflake Girl", "Pretty Good Year"
2	Whigfield ^{[Y]}	11	"Another Day", "Saturday Night"

== Notes ==
- ^{a} "Another Day" reached its peak of number seven on 7 January 1995 (week ending).
- ^{b} "Love Me for a Reason" reached its peak of number two on 7 January 1995 (week ending).
- ^{c} "Cotton Eye Joe" reached its peak of number-one on 14 January 1995 (week ending).
- ^{d} "Them Girls, Them Girls" reached its peak of number five on 1 January 1995 (week ending).
- ^{e} "Things Can Only Get Better" originally peaked outside the top ten at number 24 upon its initial release in 1993.
- ^{f} "I Like to Move It" re-entered the top 10 at number 10 on 12 March 1993 (week ending) for 8 weeks.
- ^{g} "Don't Go Breaking My Heart" was recorded as a duet by Elton John and RuPaul for the John album Duets.
- ^{h} "U R the Best Thing" originally peaked outside the top ten at number 72 upon its initial release in 1992. It also entered at a new peak of number 19 in April 1993.
- ^{i} "Light My Fire" originally peaked outside the top ten at number 45 upon its initial release in 1993. It was remixed and re-released in 1994.
- ^{j} "Come on You Reds" was released by Manchester United F.C. to celebrate reaching the FA Cup Final in 1994.
- ^{k} Status Quo collaborated on "Come on You Reds" but are not credited on the single's cover.
- ^{l} Released as the official single for Comic Relief.
- ^{m} 'Absolutely Fabulous' was a pseudonym for Pet Shop Boys. The song "Absolutely Fabulous" borrowed lines from the television series of the same name.
- ^{n} The B-52's were known as The B.C. 52's for their recording of "(Meet) The Flintstones" to match the setting of the film in the Stone Age.
- ^{o} "Crazy for You" originally peaked outside the top ten at number 44 upon its initial release in 1993.
- ^{p} DJ Miko's cover of "What's Up?" by 4 Non Blondes featured uncredited vocals from Louise Gard.
- ^{q} The original version of "Girls Just Want to Have Fun" was released in 1984 and peaked at number 2. The 1994 version, entitled "Hey Now (Girls Just Want to Have Fun)", was a reggae-tinged arrangement of Lauper's original standard, with a musical tip of the hat to Redbone's "Come and Get Your Love".
- ^{r} "We Have All the Time In the World" was covered by My Bloody Valentine for charity and use in a television advertising campaign for Guinness. The original version by Louis Armstrong was subsequently re-released, peaking at number three.
- ^{s} "Power Rangers" was released during the airing of the first series of the television series Mighty Morphin Power Rangers in the UK and included several lines of dialogue from the show.
- ^{t} The song "Power Rangers" was performed by Aaron Waters (who had also composed the theme tune) but the Official Charts Company credits it to Mighty Morphin Power Rangers.
- ^{u} "Another Day" re-entered the top 10 at number 7 on 7 January 1995 (week ending).
- ^{v} Zig and Zag were puppet characters performed by Mick O'Hara and Ciaran Morrison, introduced on Irish television series Dempsey's Den but who found wider fame through Channel 4 series The Big Breakfast.
- ^{w} Figure includes single that first chart in 1993 but peaked in 1994.
- ^{x} Figure includes single that peaked in 1993.
- ^{y} Figure includes single that peaked in 1995.
- ^{z} Figure includes appearances on Reel 2 Real's "I Like to Move It" and "Go On Move".

== See also ==
- 1994 in British music
- List of number-one singles from the 1990s (UK)
