= The Best Dance Album in the World... Ever! =

Compilation album series

The Best Dance Album in the World... Ever! is a long-running compilation series released by Circa Records, as part of The Best... Album in the World...Ever! brand.

== Track listing ==
=== Part 1 (1993) ===
Professional ratings
Review scores
Source	Rating
Music Week	4/5 stars

VTDCD 17

Best Album dance in the World

==== Disc 1 ====
1. Black Box – "Ride On Time"
2. 2 Unlimited – "No Limit"
3. Haddaway – "What is Love"
4. Dr. Alban – "It's My Life"
5. Snap! – "The Power"
6. Technotronic – "Pump Up the Jam"
7. Ace of Base – "All That She Wants"
8. East Side Beat – "Ride Like the Wind"
9. Erasure – "Take a Chance on Me"
10. Rozalla – "Everybody's Free (To Feel Good)"
11. M/A/R/R/S – "Pump Up the Volume"
12. S'Express – "Theme from S-Express"
13. Heaven 17 – "Temptation" (Brothers in Rhythm Remix)
14. Sub Sub – "Ain't No Love (Ain't No Use)"
15. M People – "How Can I Love You More?"
16. The Shamen – "Phorever People"
17. The KLF – "3 AM Eternal"
18. Bizarre Inc – "I'm Gonna Get You"
19. Utah Saints – "Something Good"
20. Rage! – "Run to You"

==== Disc 2 ====
1. Deee-Lite – "Groove is in the Heart" (Peanut Butter Mix)
2. Sister Sledge – "We Are Family" (Sure is Pure Remix Edit)
3. Chaka Khan – "I'm Every Woman" (Dancin' Danny D Remix)
4. CeCe Peniston – "Finally"
5. Inner City – "Big Fun"
6. Mantronix – "Got to Have Your Love"
7. The Source – "You Got the Love"
8. Arrested Development – "People Everyday"
9. Kris Kross – "Jump"
10. C + C Music Factory – "Gonna Make You Sweat (Everybody Dance Now)"
11. Soul II Soul – "Back to Life (However Do You Want Me)"
12. The Adventures of Stevie V – "Dirty Cash" (Radio Edit)
13. West End featuring Sybil – "The Love I Lost"
14. Incognito – "Always There"
15. SL2 – "On a Ragga Tip"
16. Shaggy – "Oh Carolina"
17. Shabba Ranks – "Mr. Loverman"
18. Kenny Thomas – "Thinking About Your Love"
19. Sydney Youngblood – "If Only I Could"
20. Soul II Soul – "Joy"

=== Part 2 (1993) ===
Professional ratings
Review scores
Source	Rating
Music Week	5/5 stars

VTDCD 22

==== Disc 1 ====
1. Snap! – "Rhythm Is a Dancer"
2. Technotronic featuring Ya Kid K – "Get Up! (Before the Night Is Over)"
3. 2 Unlimited – "Tribal Dance"
4. Cappella – "U Got 2 Know"
5. Jazzy Jeff and the Fresh Prince – "Boom! Shake the Room"
6. Apache Indian – "Boom Shack-A-Lak" (Edit)
7. House of Pain – "Jump Around"
8. Urban Cookie Collective – "The Key the Secret"
9. The KLF – "Last Train to Trancentral" (Live From The Lost Continent)
10. The Shamen – "LSI (Love Sex Intelligence)"
11. The Prodigy – "Out of Space" (7" Edit)
12. Bitty McLean – "It Keeps Rainin'"
13. Inner Circle – "Sweat (A La La La La Long)" (Original Version)
14. KWS – "Please Don't Go"
15. SWV – "Right Here" (Human Nature Radio Mix)
16. Shanice – "I Love Your Smile" (Driza Bone Remix)
17. Soul II Soul – "Keep on Movin'"
18. En Vogue – "My Lovin' (You're Never Gonna Get It)" (Radio Edit)
19. Crystal Waters – "Gypsy Woman (La Da Dee)"
20. Gabrielle – "Dreams"
21. P.M. Dawn – "Set Adrift on Memory Bliss"

==== Disc 2 ====
1. Adamski – "Killer"
2. Yazz – "The Only Way Is Up"
3. Sabrina Johnston – "Peace" (Brothers in Rhythm Edit)
4. Sybil – "When I'm Good and Ready"
5. Gloria Gaynor – "I Will Survive" (Phil Kelsey Remix)
6. Coldcut featuring Lisa Stansfield – "People Hold On"
7. Aftershock – "Slave to the Vibe" (David Anthony Remix)
8. Kym Sims – "Too Blind to See It" (Hurley's "No Rap" House Mix)
9. Inner City – "Good Life"
10. Bass-O-Matic – "Fascinating Rhythm" (The Loud Edit)
11. Usura – "Open Your Mind"
12. Felix – "Don't You Want Me" (Hooj mix edit)
13. Oceanic – "Insanity" (Legendary Mix)
14. East 17 – "House of Love"
15. Louchie Lou & Michie One – "Shout (It Out)"
16. Beats International featuring Lindy Layton – "Dub Be Good to Me"
17. Stereo MC's – "Step It Up" (Radio Edit)
18. De La Soul – "The Magic Number"
19. Neneh Cherry – "Buffalo Stance"
20. Bomb the Bass – "Beat Dis"
21. New Order – "Regret"

=== Part 3 (1994) ===
Professional ratings
Review scores
Source	Rating
Music Week	4/5 stars

VTDCD 32

==== Disc 1 ====
1. M People – "Moving on Up"
2. D:Ream – "Things Can Only Get Better" (D:Reamix Edit)
3. Tony Di Bart – "The Real Thing" (The Joy Brothers Remake)
4. CeCe Peniston – "We Got a Love Thang"
5. Snap! – "Exterminate!"
6. Maxx – "Get-A-Way" (Airplay Mix)
7. 2 Unlimited – "Let the Beat Control Your Body" (Airplay Edit)
8. Cappella – "U Got 2 Let the Music"
9. Haddaway – "Rock My Heart" (Radio Mix)
10. The Grid – "Swamp Thing" (Radio Mix)
11. The Good Men – "Give It Up"
12. Reel 2 Real – "I Like To Move It" (Radio Edit)
13. Aswad – "Shine"
14. CJ Lewis – "Sweets For My Sweet"
15. Salt 'N' Pepa – "Let's Talk About Sex"
16. K7 – "Come Baby Come" (Radio Edit)
17. MC Hammer – "U Can't Touch This"
18. Snow – "Informer" (Radio Edit)
19. Bitty McLean – "Dedicated to the One I Love"
20. Soul II Soul – "Get a Life"

==== Disc 2 ====
1. 2 Unlimited – "Get Ready For This"
2. Club House – "Light My Fire" (Cappella (RAF Zone) Remix Edit)
3. Urban Cookie Collective – "Feels Like Heaven"
4. Doop – "Doop"
5. The B-52s – "(Meet) The Flintstones" (Original LP Version) (Fred's Edit)
6. The Doobie Brothers – "Long Train Runnin'" (Sure Is Pure 7" Edit)
7. New Order – "Blue Monday" (1988 Remix)
8. Gloworm – "Carry Me Home" (Radio Mix)
9. Robin S. – "Show Me Love"
10. Quartz – "It's Too Late"
11. Eternal – "Stay"
12. Juliet Roberts – "Caught in the Middle (My Heart Beats Like a Drum)" (Def Classic Radio Mix)
13. Blue Pearl – "Naked in the Rain" (Radio Mix)
14. Nomad – "(I Wanna Give You) Devotion"
15. The Shamen – "Ebeneezer Goode" (Shamen Vocal)
16. Erasure – "Always" (Microbots Trance Dance Mix)
17. The Time Frequency – "Real Love"
18. 49ers – "Touch Me"
19. Paula Abdul – "Straight Up"
20. East 17 – "It's Alright" (The Guvnor Mix)

Note, "Blue Monday" is actually mislabeled as the 1988 remix. It is the original 1983 12" version.

=== Part 4 (1994) ===
VTDCD 40

==== Disc 1 ====
1. Pato Banton – "Baby Come Back"
2. Corona – "Rhythm of the Night"
3. Culture Beat – "Mr. Vain"
4. 2 Unlimited – "The Real Thing"
5. The Prodigy – "No Good (Start The Dance)"
6. Reel 2 Real – "Go On Move" (Erick 'More' '94 Vocal Mix)
7. C + C Music Factory – "Things That Make You Go Hmmm..."
8. Gary Clail & On-U Sound System – "Human Nature"
9. M-Beat – "Incredible" (Radio Edit)
10. Cameo – "Word Up"
11. R. Kelly – "She's Got That Vibe"
12. Eternal – "Just a Step From Heaven"
13. M People – "One Night in Heaven"
14. Gwen Guthrie – "Ain't Nothin' Goin' on But the Rent"
15. George Michael – "Too Funky"
16. D:Ream – "U R the Best Thing"
17. K-Klass – "Rhythm is a Mystery"
18. China Black – "Searching" (Mykaell S. Riley Mix)
19. Loose Ends – "Hangin' on a String (Contemplating)"
20. Massive Attack – "Unfinished Sympathy"

==== Disc 2 ====
1. Chaka Demus & Pliers – "Tease Me"
2. Dawn Penn – You Don't Love Me (No No No) (Original Radio Mix)
3. Red Dragon – "Compliments on Your Kiss"
4. Ace of Base – "Don't Turn Around" (7" Aswad Mix)
5. PJ & Duncan – "Let's Get Ready to Rhumble" (100% Radio Mix)
6. Maxx – "No More (I Can't Stand It)"
7. Cappella – "Move On Baby"
8. Take That – "Relight My Fire"
9. Frankie Goes To Hollywood – "Relax (MCMXCIII)"
10. Kym Mazelle & Jocelyn Brown – "No More Tears (Enough Is Enough)" (Radio Edit)
11. Diana Ross – "Chain Reaction"
12. Kim Appleby – "Don't Worry"
13. Jermaine Stewart – "We Don't Have To (Take Our Clothes Off)"
14. Black Box – "The Total Mix"
15. N-Trance – "Turn Up The Power"
16. CJ Lewis – "Everything's Alright (Uptight)"
17. Snap! – "Ooops Up"
18. Soul II Soul – "A Dreams a Dream"
19. Music Relief – "What's Going On"
20. Kylie Minogue – "Confide In Me" (Radio Mix)

=== Part 5 (1995) ===
VTDCD 40

==== Disc 1 ====
1. Jam & Spoon – "Right In The Night (Fall In Love With Music)"
2. M People – "I'm Excited"
3. Livin' Joy – "Dreamer"
4. Alex Party – "Don't Give Me Your Life"
5. Scatman John – "Scatman"
6. The Outhere Brothers – "Don't Stop (Wiggle Wiggle)"
7. The Bucketheads – "The Bomb! (These Sounds Fall Into My Mind) (Radio Mix)
8. Bobby Brown – "Humping Around"
9. The Nightcrawlers – "Push The Feeling On" (Radio Edit)
10. M.C. Sar & The Real McCoy – "Another Night"
11. A.D.A.M. – "Zombie!" (Eternal Airplay Mix)
12. Clock – "Whoomp! (There It Is) (Clock 10 To 2 Mix)"
13. Rednex – "Cotton Eye Joe"
14. Culture Beat – "Got to Get It"
15. Corona – "Baby Baby"
16. DJ Miko – "What's Up"
17. Deuce – "Call It Love"
18. N-Trance – "Set You Free"
19. Perfecto Allstarz – "Reach Up" (Papa's Got A Brand New Pig Bag) (Radio Edit)
20. Whigfield – "Saturday Night"

==== Disc 2 ====
1. Billy Ray Martin – "Your Loving Arms"
2. Strike – "U Sure Do"
3. Bobby Brown – "Two Can Play That Game" (K Klassik Radio Mix)
4. Freak Power – "Turn On, Tune In & Cop Out"
5. The Chemical Brothers – "Leave Home" (Radio Edit)
6. Baby D – "Let Me Be Your Fantasy" (Ruffer Remix)
7. The Human League – "Tell Me When"
8. Perez Prado – "Guaglione"
9. Clock – "Axel F"
10. Jinny – "Keep Warm" (Alex Party Remix)
11. Grace – "Not Over Yet"
12. Sugarbabies – "Magic In U"
13. Isha D – "Stay" (Tonight)
14. Ini Kamoze – "Here Comes The Hotstepper"
15. Jodeci – "Freek 'N You"
16. Shaggy – "In The Summertime"
17. Big Mountain – "Baby, I Love Your Way"
18. Ace of Base – "The Sign"
19. Love City Groove – "Love City Groove"
20. East 17 – "Steam" (Vapoureyes Mix)

=== Reissue (2009) ===
A three CD reissue was released in 2009.
