= To the Maxximum =

To The Maxximum

Studio album by Maxx
- Released: 22 June 1994
- Recorded: September 1993–May 1994, Germany
- Genre: Eurodance
- Length: 64:09
- Label: Intercord; Blow Up; Remixed Records; Pulse-8 Records
- Producer: The Movement

Singles from To the Maxximum
- 1. "Get-A-Way" Released: 1 November 1993; 2. "No More (I Can't Stand It)" Released: 1 March 1994; 3. "You Can Get It" Released: 12 September 1994; 4. "I Can Make You Feel Like" Released: 26 May 1995

Professional ratings
Review scores
Source	Rating
Smash Hits	4/5

To the Maxximum is the debut album by the German Eurodance project Maxx. The album was first released in June 1994 in Germany via Blow Up and Intercord. The album was also released in Scandinavia via Remixed Records and in the UK via Pulse 8 records. The hits "Get-A-Way", "No More (I Can't Stand It)" and "You Can Get It" are all featured on the album.

== Critical reception ==
Pete Stanton from Smash Hits gave To the Maxximum four out of five and named it Best New Album, writing, "Maxx haven't created a startling new path for dance music, but they've done pretty well. As you know, "Get-A-Way" is a blinding ragga corker, as is the follow-up "No More (I Can't Stand It)". But the fun doesn't stop there. "I Can Make You Feel Like" is a tingling, groovy thing while "Fight" is a guitar-crunching stormer. Stick with Maxx and you'll do alright."

== Track listing ==
No.	Title	Length
1.	"To the Maxximum Part I"	2:17
2.	"To the Maxximum Part II"	2:17
3.	"No More (I Can't Stand It)"	4:40
4.	"I Can Make You Feel Like"	5:55
5.	"Get-A-Way"	3:45
6.	"Suddenly" (lyrics by M. Minx)	4:18
7.	"Heart of Stone"	4:17
8.	"Fight"	4:18
9.	"Voodoo Child" (lyrics by M. Minx)	5:34
10.	"You Can Get It"	4:24
11.	"Ritmo De La Casa"	4:15
12.	"Should I Stay, Should I Go"	4:54
13.	"I Want You"	5:19
14.	"Maxximum Extacy"	3:21
15.	"The Maxx Experience"	4:31
Total length:		64:09

== Credits ==
- Artwork – I-D Büro
- Engineer (mix) – Robert Lee
- Engineer (recording) – Luke Steward
- Engineer (sequence design & acoustic structures) – The Movement
- Executive producer – The Hitman
- Instruments – Dakota O'Neil, George Torpey
- Lyrics – Gary Bokoe (tracks: 3 5 8 10 13 14)
- Mixed by – Dee O'Neil, George Torpey
- Music, lyrics – Dakota O'Neil, Dawhite (tracks: 3 4 5 7 10 12), George Torpey, The Hitman
- Photography – Axel Jansen
- Producer – The Movement
- Vocals – Gary Bokoe, Linda Meek

== Charts ==
Chart (1994–1995)	Peak position
Australia (ARIA)	187
Austria (Ö3 Austria Top 40)	32
Finland (Suomen virallinen lista)	6
Germany (Media Control Charts)	22
Netherlands (Dutch Top 40)	25
Sweden (Sverigetopplistan)	10
Switzerland (Swiss Music Charts)	29
UK Albums Chart	66
