= I Can Make You Feel Like =

Single by Maxx

from the album To the Maxximum
- Released: 10 July 1995
- Length: 3:25
- Label: Pulse-8
- Songwriters: Dakota O'Neill, Dawhite, Gary Bokoe, George Torpey, The Hitman
- Producer: The Movement

Maxx singles chronology
"You Can Get It" (1994)	"I Can Make You Feel Like" (1995)	"Move Your Body" (1995)

Music video
- "I Can Make You Feel Like" on YouTube

"I Can Make You Feel Like" is a song by the German Eurodance project Maxx. It was selected as the fourth single from the project's debut album, To The Maxximum (1994). The single was released only in the United Kingdom in July 1995 and reached number 56 on the UK Singles Chart.

In Estonia, the song is well known for its cover by Üllar Jörberg entitled "Kutse tantsule" (lit. 'invitation to dance'). Because of this, it has become the subject of numerous parodies and covers in Estonia as well, the most well-known of which was performed by Tanel Padar on the TV show "Su nägu kõlab tuttavalt" (Estonia's adaptation of Your Face Sounds Familiar).

== Track listing ==
No.	Title	Length
1.	"I Can Make You Feel Like (Edit)"	3:25
2.	"No More (Bass Bumpers Remix)" (Remix – Bass Bumpers, Henning Reith)	5:47
3.	"Get Away (Twilight Mix)" (Remix – Naked Eye)	5:38
4.	"Get Away (2AM Club Mix)" (Remix – T.K.)	5:21

== Credits ==
- Engineer (mix) – Robert Lee
- Engineer (recording) – Luke Steward
- Instruments – Dee O'Neil, George Torpey
- Lyrics – Dakota O'Neil, Dawhite, Gary Bokoe, George Torpey, The Hitman
- Music – Dakota O'Neil, Dawhite, George Torpey, The Hitman*
- Producer – The Movement
- Sequence design & acoustic structures – The Movement
- Vocals – Linda Meek

== Charts ==
Chart (1995)	Peak position
UK Singles (OCC)	56
UK Pop Tip Club Chart (Music Week)	15
