= Born (China Black album) =

Studio album by China Black
- Released: 27 February 1995
- Label: Polydor
- Producers: Simon Fung; Mykaell S. Riley; RONIN Inc.; Sound Doctor; Longsy D

Professional ratings
Review scores
Source	Rating
AllMusic	3/5 stars

Born is the only album by British pop-reggae duo China Black, consisting of singer Errol Reid and musician, songwriter and record producer Simon Fung. It was released on 27 February 1995 by Polydor Records and contains the duo's biggest hit single "Searching", which reached number four in the UK singles chart in August 1994, plus the following two singles "Stars" (UK No. 19) and "Almost See You (Somewhere)" (UK No. 31).

== Track listing ==
All tracks written by Simon Fung.

No.	Title	Length
1.	"Searching"	3:56
2.	"Stars"	4:16
3.	"Almost See You"	4:06
4.	"Born"	4:28
5.	"Own Way"	3:52
6.	"Where"	3:41
7.	"No Surprise"	4:27
8.	"Sunrise"	3:28
9.	"I Love Life"	3:54
10.	"Child 'o' Nature"	3:55

CD bonus tracks

No.	Title	Length
11.	"Searching" (Longsy D Remix)	4:08
12.	"Stars" (Longsy D Remix)	3:55

== Personnel ==
Adapted from the album's liner notes.

China Black

- Errol Reid – lead vocals (all tracks)
- Simon Fung – keyboards (all tracks)

Additional musicians

- Winston Blissett – bass guitar (tracks 1, 3, 4, 6–12)
- Chris Ballin – backing vocals (all tracks)
- Tony Bryan – backing vocals (all tracks)
- Chezere – backing vocals (all tracks)
- Hazel Fernandez – backing vocals (all tracks)
- Dee Heron – backing vocals (all tracks)
- Stephen Hussey – strings arrangements, with the Royal Philharmonic Orchestra (tracks 1, 3, 4, 6–12)

Technical

- Simon Fung – original production (all tracks)
- Mykaell S. Riley – producer (tracks 1–6, 8, 9)
- RONIN Inc. – additional production (tracks 7, 10)
- Sound Doctor – original production (track 2)
- Longsy D – producer (tracks 11, 12), engineer (tracks 11, 12)
- Jeremy Allom – engineer (tracks 1, 2, 6)
- Brian Tench – engineer (tracks 3, 4, 8, 9)
- Chris Potter – engineer (track 5)
- Steve Greenwell – vocal recording (tracks 1, 2, 4, 6, 7, 10–12)
- Tony Nwachukwu – programming (tracks 1, 3, 4, 6–12)
- Simon Fowler – photography
- Stylorouge – design

== Charts ==
Chart performance for Born
Chart (1995)	Peak position
UK Albums (Official Charts)	27
