= Flourgon =

- Born: Michael May c.1970 Kingston, Jamaica
- Genres: Reggae, dancehall
- Years active: Mid-1980s–present
- Labels: Techniques, VP, Exterminator

Michael May (born c. 1970), better known as Flourgon, is a Jamaican dancehall artist.

== Biography ==
May got his nickname of 'Flourgon', which became his stage name, due to his love of dumplings. After being tutored by Charlie Chaplin, he gained experience deejaying on various Kingston sound systems, he started his own — Sweet Love, which featured Buju Banton early in his career. He often performed with his brother, the deejay Red Dragon, and with his close friends Daddy Lizard (also his brother-in-law) and Sanchez.

He released several Jamaican hit singles in the late 1980s and 1990s, recording for producers such as Winston Riley, Steely & Clevie, and Philip "Fatis" Burrell, both solo efforts and in combination with other deejays and singers such as Red Dragon, Freddie McGregor ("Bless My Soul"), Sanchez ("Madly In Love"), Ninjaman ("Zig It Up"), and Thriller U ("Girls Just Wanna Have Fun"). His success continued into the 21st century, and he continued to perform live but his releases became less frequent. In 2010 he announced the intention to release a new album titled Can't Live Without You, but it has yet to be released.

May became a Rastafarian and no longer performs some of his earlier material, saying in 2008: "certain songs mi used to do mi wouldn't do anymore. I'm more conscious now".

In 2016, he released the single "You Got Me Talking", and planned to tour Europe with Sanchez.

Flourgon's son, Chad Hype, is an upcoming artist who draws inspiration from dancehall and reggae music from his father's era.

In March 2018, Flourgon filed a lawsuit against Miley Cyrus and record label RCA for copyright infringement, saying that Cyrus's song "We Can't Stop" includes lyrics from his song "We Run Things."

== Discography ==
- Red Dragon Vs Flourgon (1989), Techniques
- Count Out (1989), VP
