= You Can Get It =

1994 single by Maxx

Single by Maxx

from the album To the Maxximum
- Released: 12 September 1994
- Genre: Eurodance; ragga; techno
- Length: 3:27
- Label: Blow Up; Intercord
- Songwriters: Dakota O'Neill; Dawhite; Gary Bokoe; George Torpey; The Hitman
- Producer: The Movement

Maxx singles chronology
"No More (I Can't Stand It)" (1994)	"You Can Get It" (1994)	"I Can Make You Feel Like" (1995)

Music video
- "You Can Get It" on YouTube

"You Can Get It" is a song by German Eurodance project Maxx, released by Blow Up and Intercord in September 1994 as the third single from the project's debut album, To the Maxximum (1994). In the United Kingdom, the song peaked at numbers 21 and 19 on the UK Singles Chart and the UK Dance Singles Chart, respectively. It was also a top-20 hit in Finland. On the Eurochart Hot 100 and the European Dance Radio Chart, "You Can Get It" reached numbers 31 and 18. The accompanying music video was directed by Basil Schlegel and produced by Sturm & Drang. It was filmed at Heroes' Square and Hotel Gellért, a spa hotel located in Budapest, Hungary. The video received "prime break out" rotation on MTV Europe in October 1994.

== Critical reception ==
James Hamilton from Music Week's RM Dance Update described "You Can Get It" as a "catchy girls chanted and ragga guy rapped thunderous almost jungle tempo though cheesy 145.7 bpm Euro pounder". Jordan Paramor from Smash Hits wrote, "It shouts 2 Unlimited, it screams techno, and it's bound to be a hot favourite down Club Cheese of a Saturday night."

== Track listing ==
All lyrics are written by Dakota O'Neil, Dawhite, Gary Bokoe, George Torpey, The Hitman; all music is composed by Dakota O'Neil, Dawhite, George Torpey, The Hitman.

No.	Title	Length
1.	"You Can Get It" (Airplay Mix)	3:27
2.	"You Can Get It" (Club Mix)	5:25
3.	"You Can Get It" (Hardsequencer Mix; Mixed by Dee O'Neil)	5:12
4.	"You Can Get It" (Trancemaster Mix)	4:58
Total length:		19:09

== Personnel ==
- Cover artwork – I-D Büro
- Lyrics – Dakota O'Neil, Dawhite, Gary Bokoe, George Torpey, The Hitman
- Mixing – The Movement (tracks: 1, 2, 4)
- Music – Dakota O'Neil, Dawhite, George Torpey, The Hitman
- Photography – A. Jansen
- Producer – The Movement
- Rap – Gary Bokoe
- Vocals – Linda Meek

== Charts ==
Chart (1994)	Peak position
Austria (Ö3 Austria Top 40)	25
Belgium (Ultratop 50 Flanders)	24
Europe (Eurochart Hot 100)	31
Europe (European Dance Radio)	18
Finland (Suomen virallinen lista)	13
France (SNEP)	28
Netherlands (Dutch Top 40)	32
Netherlands (Single Top 100)	35
Scotland (OCC)	18
Sweden (Sverigetopplistan)	37
UK Singles (OCC)	21
UK Dance (OCC)	19

== Release history ==
Region	Date	Format(s)	Label(s)	Ref.
Europe	12 September 1994	CD	Blow Up; Intercord	
United Kingdom	17 October 1994	7-inch vinyl; 12-inch vinyl; CD; cassette	Pulse-8	
