= Üllar Jörberg =

Estonian singer

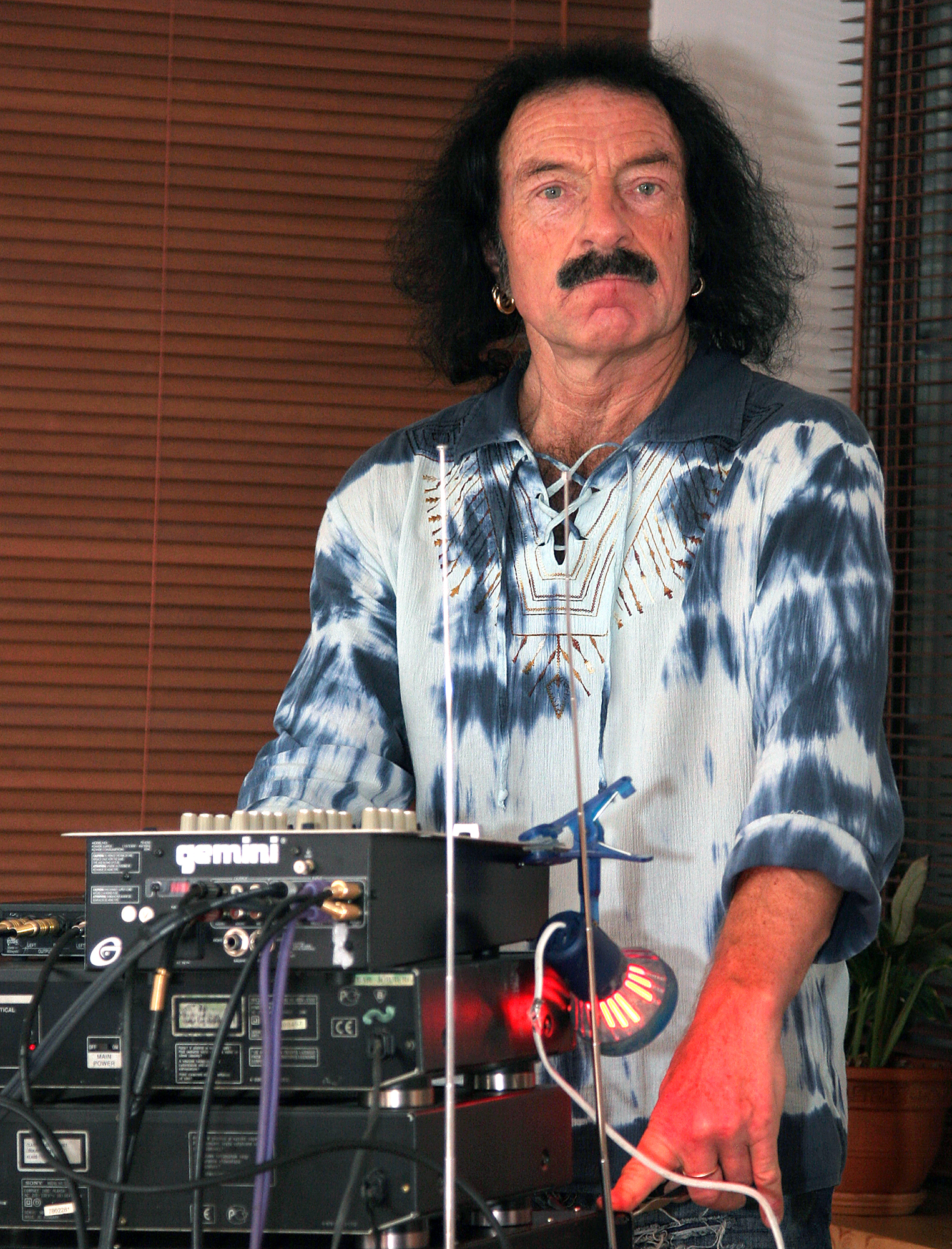
- Üllar Jörberg in 2006

Background information
- Born: June 9, 1941
- Died: December 26, 2018 (aged 77)
- Genres: Pop, folk, world, country
- Occupation: Singer
- Instrument: Vocals
- Years active: 1967–2018
- Labels: Melodiya, AS Maarja & Jörberg, Theka, LeHelMus, HelMus, Records 2000, OÜ Lehelmus
- Formerly of: Fix

Üllar "Jörpa" Jörberg (Estonian pronunciation: [yllɑr jørpɑ jørberg]; 9 June 1941 – 26 December 2018) was an Estonian singer.

== Biography ==
In school, he sang in a choir as well as an all-male vocal quartet. He graduated from Viljandi Secondary School No. 2 in 1961. Prior to serving in the Soviet Army, he studied physical education at the University of Tartu.

He started singing professionally in 1967, playing solo gigs at the Kaseke restaurant in Tartu. He also later performed with the band Fix.

He released dozens of records and over 600 songs over the span of his career; predominantly dance music. Many of his hits were Estonian-language translations of popular songs in other languages, but he did have some well-known originals as well. According to Kroonika, his best-known songs include Mereranna tuul (lit. 'seaside breeze'; an Estonian-language cover of "Agadoo") and Kutse tantsule (lit. 'invitation to dance'; an Estonian-language cover of "I Can Make You Feel Like").

In 2014, TV3 made a documentary about him named A Story about the Real Jörberg (Jutustus tõelisest Jörbergist), directed by Antti Oolo.

In 2017, Jörberg, along with his wife Ester Jörberg and fellow musician Onu Bella, hosted the program "Great Love of the South Sea" (Suur Lõunamere Armastus) on Raadio 2. Also that year, Jörberg announced his retirement; his last major performances were at the 2018 Õllesummer and Haapsalu festivals.

Jörberg died as a result of a sudden medical condition on 26 December 2018. He was survived by his wife Ester and son Sven.

== Discography ==
In the below list, the publisher follows the name of the album. Some albums contain guest appearances by other artists:

- 1986 "Üllar Jörberg", Meloodia
- 1992 "The away places: the best of Üllar Jörberg 1992", (Note: Sic. A few of Jörberg's albums have English titles, these are not translations.) Üllar Jörberg
- 1992 "Tänan sind", Helijälg
- 1992 "Wanderer's love songs", Stellaris
- 1992 "Saarenmaan valssi: Sävellahja Virosta", Üllar Jörberg and Voldemar Kuslap
- 1995 "Mexico kuu", Best Hits
- 1998 "Ununenud meloodiad", Cajun Music
- 1993 "Meri ja kitarr", Heldur Jõgioja
- 1996 "Suur ahv", Theka
- 1997 "Kutse people", Hitivabrik
- 2000 "Millal märkad mind?", HelMus
- 2000 "Parimad 1", Records 2000
- 2000 "Sävellahja Virosta: Tulkaa tanssimaan: Saarenmaan valssi", LeHelMus
- 2000 "Kõik muutub...", LeHelMus
- 2000 "Varjud alleel", Records 2000
- 2001 "Parimad 2", Records 2000
- 2002 "Tantsin kogu elu", Records 2000
- 2002 "Üllari kuldsed hitid: Õnnesoov", LeHelMus
- 2004 "Õnnelootus", TopTen
- 2004 "Very Best of Üllar Jörberg", Records 2000
- 2006 "Kord tuleb aeg...", Records 2000
- 2006 "Parimad III", Eurorecords
- 2008 "Flamenco Rio öös", LeHelMus
- 2008 "Viva Šampanja", Records 2000
- 2009 "Üllar Jörberg", Estonian Artist Agency
- 2009 "Elujõe kaldad" LeHelMus
- 2009 "Kordumatu" LeHelMus
- 2013 "Kaunimad armastuslaulud" Aenigma OÜ
- 2014 "Parimad 3" Records 2000
- 2016 "Kuld [3CD]" Records 2000
