= Records 2000 =

Estonian record label

Records 2000 is an Estonian record label. As of 2013, its market share was the highest in the country. It is owned by OÜ Aenigma, which is owned by Peeter Kaljuste.

== See also ==
- Üllar Jörberg
