= Searching (China Black song) =

1992 single by China Black

- 1994 re-release cover artwork

Single by China Black

from the album Born
- Released: 29 June 1992
- Recorded: 1991
- Studio: Metropolis (London)
- Genre: Reggae
- Length: 3:56
- Label: Big One (1992); Wildcard, Polydor (1994)
- Songwriter: Simon Fung
- Producer: Simon Fung

China Black singles chronology
"Searching" (1992, 1994)	"Stars" (1994)

Audio
- "Searching" on YouTube

"Searching" is a song by British pop-reggae duo China Black, written and produced by the duo's instrumentalist, Simon Fung. It was originally released as a standalone single in June 1992 on the UK independent label Big One but did not become a chart success. In 1994, it was picked up by the Wildcard label of Polydor Records and re-released in the United Kingdom on 4 July 1994, charting at number four on the UK Singles Chart. It was then released worldwide on 8 August 1994 and experienced success in Flanders, France, Germany, Iceland, and Ireland. "Searching" was nominated in the category for Tune of the Year at the International Dance Awards 1995. The 1994 version was later included on the duo's only album, Born, in 1995.

== Background and release ==
"Searching" was originally recorded in 1991 and released the following year; however, it did not become a hit, initially selling 10,000 to 15,000 copies. Two years after its original release, Johnny Lords of Jago, at the time known for his work with British singer Gabrielle, decided to pick up the single. At Lords' suggestion, the song was re-recorded to tone down its reggae sound in order to garner radio airplay and re-released on 4 July 1994 to British audiences. A month later, on 8 August 1994, "Searching" was given an international release.

The re-release debuted at number 17 on the UK Singles Chart on 10 July 1994 and rose to its peak of number four on 7 August, where it stayed for two weeks. On 1 August, the song was awarded a silver sales certification from the British Phonographic Industry (BPI) for shipping over 200,000 copies, and it ended the year as the UK's 25th-highest-selling single. In Ireland, the song debuted on the Irish Singles Chart on 4 August 1994 and peaked at number 11. Following its international release, the song charted in Germany, Iceland, and the Flanders region of Belgium, peaking at numbers 82, 27, and 49, respectively. In March 1995, the single charted in France, peaking at number 17 on 15 April and spending 11 weeks on the French Singles Chart.

== Critical reception ==
In 1994, Music & Media magazine said, "Through this single you get an idea what it would be like if Michael Jackson tried his luck on swingbeat. The current trend for slower beats would make the accompanying dance a lot easier". Andy Beevers from Music Week gave it four out of five, calling it a "catchy soulful reggae tune", that is now re-released with the "obligatory remixes." He added, "These do not do the song any favours, but the original sounds as fine as ever", and "it could now be the summer hit that it deserved to be all along." Ralph Tee from the magazine's RM Dance Update agreed, "For me though, it's the original version which holds all the song's charm, and fortunately it's included here for all who missed out the first time." Another RM editor, James Hamilton described the 1992 version as "a sweet reggae styled jogger". In 1994, he deemed it a "tremulously crooning Errol Reid's superb soulful sweet slinky reggae swayer". Pete Stanton from Smash Hits gave "Searching" four out of five, writing, "The nicest song off the pile, this one. [...] This is a subtle reggae track that floats about your room with it's [sic] soft vocals and swaying rhythms. Ooh yes, lovely."

== Track listings ==
- UK 12-inch single (1992)

A1. "Searching" (original soul)
A2. "Searching" (reggae)
A3. "Searching" (dub)
B1. "Searching" (club soul)
B2. "Searching" (soft soul)

- UK 7-inch single (1994)
1. "Searching" – 3:56
2. "Searching" (Original Longsy D Mix) – 4:08
- European maxi-CD single
1. "Searching" (Mykaell S. Riley mix) – 3:56
2. "Searching" (Original Longsy D mix) – 4:08
3. "Searching" (Ronin mix) – 4:30
4. "Searching" (Full Force remix) – 3:59
- Dutch CD single
1. "Searching" (Mykaell S. Riley mix) – 3:56
2. "Searching" (Original Longsy D mix) – 4:08

== Charts ==
=== Weekly charts ===
Chart (1992)	Peak position
UK Dance Singles (Music Week)	8

Chart (1994–1995)	Peak position
Belgium (Ultratop 50 Flanders)	49
Europe (Eurochart Hot 100)	16
Europe (European Hit Radio)	19
France (SNEP)	17
Germany (GfK)	82
Iceland (Íslenski Listinn Topp 40)	27
Ireland (IRMA)	11
Israel (Israeli Singles Chart)	25
Scottish Singles Sales (Official Charts)	8
UK Singles (Official Charts)	4
UK Hip Hop/R&B (Official Charts)	15
UK Airplay (Music Week)	1

=== Year-end charts ===
Chart (1994)	Position
UK Singles (OCC)	25
UK Airplay (Music Week)	7

== Certifications ==
Region	Certification	Certified units/sales
United Kingdom (BPI)	Silver	200,000^{^}
^{^} Shipments figures based on certification alone.

== Release history ==
Region	Date	Label(s)	Ref(s).
United Kingdom (original)	29 June 1992	Big One	
United Kingdom (re-release)	4 July 1994	Wild Card	
International	8 August 1994	Wild Card; Polydor	
Australia	10 October 1994	Polydor	
