= Everybody Gonfi-Gon =

1994 single by Two Cowboys

Single by Two Cowboys
- Released: 27 June 1994
- Genre: House
- Length: 4:32 (original version); 3:06 (New New Atlantic edit)
- Label: Ffrreedom; 3 Beat Music
- Songwriters: Maurizio Braccagni; Roberto Gallo Salsotto
- Producers: Maurizio Braccagni; Roberto Gallo Salsotto

Two Cowboys singles chronology
"Everybody Gonfi-Gon" (1994)	"Get Up" (1994)

Music video
- "Everybody Gonfi-Gon" on YouTube

"Everybody Gonfi-Gon" is a song by Italian Eurodance project Two Cowboys. It was released in June 1994 by Ffrreedom Records and 3 Beat Music as the project's debut single. Both written and produced by Maurizio Braccagni and Roberto Gallo Salsotto, it drew comparisons to other string-driven country-dance hits at the time, including The Grid's "Swamp Thing" and "Cotton Eye Joe" by Rednex, "Everybody Gonfi-Gon" became a hit single as well, reaching number two in Finland and Iceland and peaking within the top 10 in Austria, Denmark, Ireland, the Netherlands, and the United Kingdom.

== Critical reception ==
Andy Beevers from Music Week gave the song four out of five, writing, "This irritating house hoe-down from Italy is threatening to be the next Doop. It has a Western flavour similar to The Grid's 'Banjo' and Bravado's 'Harmonica Man' but is far more cheesy. It was initially snapped up for UK releases by 3-Beat, although it has been sub-licensed to ffrr to make the most of its chart potential." Tim Jeffery from the Record Mirror Dance Update commented, "Cheesy record alert! This unashamedly commercial track is to barn dancing what 'Doop' was to the charleston, with fiddles, banjos and lots of whopping cowboy noises. You'll either love or hate it and it will no doubt divide the nation in the same way 'Doop' did. Mecca clubs will embrace it as a great party record, others will have their hands over their ears." James Hamilton from Dance Update named it a "madly happy fiddle and banjo prodded galloping square dance/disco hybrid" in his weekly RM dance column. Emma Cochrane from Smash Hits wrote, "Imagine you're stuck in a barn with a mad fiddler, a drum machine and a few hundred over-enthusiastic good ol' boys who want you to join their party. This is what it would sound like. The next 'Doop', allegedly."

== Track listings ==
- CD single
1. "Everybody Gonfi-Gon" (New New Atlantic Edit) – 3:06
2. "Everybody Gonfi-Gon" (New New Atlantic Mix) – 5:55
3. "Everybody Gonfi-Gon" – 4:32
4. "Everybody Gonfi-Gon" (Valencia Mix) – 5:13
- German maxi-CD
1. "Everybody Gonfi-Gon" (Video Version) – 3:02
2. "Everybody Gonfi-Gon" (Costa del Sol Mix) – 4:44
3. "Everybody Gonfi-Gon" (New Atlantic Mix) – 6:04
4. "Everybody Gonfi-Gon" (Bailamos Mix) – 5:12
5. "Everybody Gonfi-Gon" (Valencia Version) – 4:44
- Swiss maxi-CD
1. "Everybody Gonfi-Gon" (Costa del Sol Radio Mix) – 3:56
2. "Everybody Gonfi-Gon" (Costa del Sol Dance Version) – 4:46
3. "Everybody Gonfi-Gon" (Valencia Radio Edit) – 3:56
4. "Everybody Gonfi-Gon" (Valencia Dance Version) – 4:46

== Charts ==
=== Weekly charts ===
Weekly chart performance for "Everybody Gonfi-Gon"
Chart (1994)	Peak position
Australia (ARIA)	76
Austria (Ö3 Austria Top 40)	6
Denmark (IFPI)	5
Europe (Eurochart Hot 100)	19
Europe (European Dance Radio)	19
Finland (Suomen virallinen lista)	2
France (SNEP)	46
Germany (GfK)	23
Iceland (Íslenski Listinn Topp 40)	2
Ireland (IRMA)	4
Israel (Israeli Singles Chart)	21
Netherlands (Dutch Top 40)	8
Netherlands (Single Top 100)	9
Scottish Singles Sales (Official Charts)	5
Sweden (Sverigetopplistan)	20
Switzerland (Schweizer Hitparade)	22
UK Singles (Official Charts)	6
UK Dance (Official Charts)	1
UK Club Chart (Music Week)	2

=== Year-end charts ===
Year-end chart performance for "Everybody Gonfi-Gon"
Chart (1994)	Position
Europe (Eurochart Hot 100)	80
Iceland (Íslenski Listinn Topp 40)	93
UK Singles (OCC)	81
UK Club Chart (Music Week)	40

== Release history ==
Release dates and formats for "Everybody Gonfi-Gon"
Region	Date	Format(s)	Label(s)	Ref.
United Kingdom	27 June 1994	7-inch vinyl; 12-inch vinyl; CD; cassette	Ffrreedom; 3 Beat Music	
Australia	5 September 1994	CD; cassette	Ffrreedom; 3 Beat Music; Polydor	
