= 2 Cowboys =

1994–2000 Italian Eurodance project

- Origin: Italy
- Genres: Eurodance
- Years active: 1994–2000
- Label: Ffrreedom
- Past members: Maurizio Braccagni; Roberto Gallo Salsotto

Two Cowboys was a short-lived Italian Eurodance project known for their hit single "Everybody Gonfi-Gon". The group was composed of Maurizio Braccagni and Roberto Gallo Salsotto.

== Discography ==
=== Singles ===
Year	Single	Chart Position								
Year	Single	AUS	AUT	FRA	GER	IRE	NDL	SWE	SWI	UK
1994	"Everybody Gonfi-Gon"	76	6	46	23	4	9	20	22	7
1999	"Everybody Gonfi-Gon 1999"	—	—	—	—	—	—	—	—	—

=== Remixes ===
Year	Artist	Track	Remix Info
1994	New Atlantic featuring Berri	"The Sunshine After the Rain"	Two Cowboys Mix
1995	Indiana Day	"All I Need Is Love (Remixes)"	Two Cowboys Dance Mix
1995	Nina	"Dance the Night Away (The Remixes)"	Two Cowboys Remix
1995	Berri	"Shine Like a Star"	Two Cowboys Original Mix
1995	Oui Rejoice featuring Daneel	"Imagine (Someday We'll Live as One)"	Two Cowboys Shiny & Sunshine Mixes
1996	DJ Dado	"X-Files"	Two Cowboys Remix
1996	Toney T	"Crazy"	Two Cowboys 7" Edit
