= Brian and Tony Gold =

- Origin: Portmore, St. Catherine, Jamaica
- Genres: Reggae, dancehall, lovers rock
- Occupations: Singer, songwriter
- Years active: 1980s–present
- Labels: Pow Wow Records, VP Records, Two friends Records, Music Works, Big Yard Music Group
- Members: Brian Gold (Brian Derek Thompson); Tony Gold (Patrick Morrison)

Brian and Tony Gold are a Jamaican reggae duo from Portmore, Saint Catherine.

== History ==
Contrary to many beliefs, Brian and Tony Gold are not actually brothers. Born Brian Derek Thompson in Birmingham, England and Patrick Anthony Morrison in Manchester, Jamaica, the duo participated in The Tastee Talent Competition held in Kingston, Jamaica in 1986. With Brian winning twice in October and again in December, while Tony placed second in the December edition. They were noted for having close and subtle harmonies, thus inviting them to join forces as a duo.

In 1987, they had their first taste of fame with the song "Ebony Eyes" on the Red Rock Label. This was quickly followed by "What's Your Name" and "Bullseye" both for King Jammy's Records and "Sweet Baby" on Bobby Digital's imprint. These songs along with the success of single "Can You" which dealt with South Africa's apartheid.

Their song "Compliments on Your Kiss" released by Pow Wow Records under the name Red Dragon with Brian and Tony Gold, peaked at no. 2 on the UK Singles Chart and on the Billboard Charts in 1994. In 2002, Big Yard Music Group and producer Christopher Birch released "Hey Sexy Lady" with Shaggy featuring Brian and Tony Gold, this song peaked at no. 3 on the Belgium Ultratop 50 Flanders Charts. As of August 2014, it was the 110th best selling single of the 21st century in France with 287,000 units sold.

== Albums ==
- Green Light (1991)
- Frontline (1991)
- Action (1991)
- Can You (1992)
- Bullseye (1995)
- Compliments on Your Kiss (1994)
