= Eighteen Strings =

1994 single by Tinman

Single by Tinman
- Released: 8 August 1994
- Genre: House
- Length: 3:48
- Label: Polydor
- Songwriters: Tommy Boyce; Bobby Hart; Paul Dakeyne
- Producer: Tinman

Tinman singles chronology
"I Got You (I Feel Good)" (1992)	"Eighteen Strings" (1994)	"Gudvibe" (1995)

"Eighteen Strings" is a song by English house music producer Tinman. It was released in August 1994 by Polydor Records, reaching number nine in the United Kingdom and peaked atop the UK Dance Chart. Outside the UK, "Eighteen Strings" topped the Canadian RPM Dance/Urban chart and reached the top 20 in Australia, Finland, Ireland and Italy.

== Critical reception ==
Music writer and columnist James Masterton described 'Eighteen Strings' as a "mainly instrumental track", "using a guitar figure that is startlingly similar to 'Smells Like Teen Spirit'. Closer examination reveals it is actually a slightly different sequence of chords, but not enough to dull recognition." Pan-European magazine Music & Media commented, "The strings attached to this dance bopper are direct quotes from Nirvana's 'Smells Like Teen Spirit'. Sequencers and the "rock da house down" one-line chorus finish it off."

Music & Media editor Maria Jimenez noted that "rockin' house with raps and a sped up Nirvana-ish guitar riff" are key in "Eighteen Strings". Andy Beevers from the Record Mirror Dance Update gave it a full score of five out of five, adding, "At long last the Nirvana sampling house stomper is cleared for take off. The shops can take down their 'Don't even think about asking for Eighteen Strings' notices'". Mark Frith from Smash Hits also gave it five out of five, writing, "A furious, pounding guitar dance tune with some samples and hooks that is even better than that one. One minute it's all mellow, then it zooms in on a complete full-on blast. Wonderful."

== Track listings ==
- CD single – Netherlands
1. "Eighteen Strings" (radio edit) – 3:48
2. "Free" (Freedom to Party edit) – 5:07
- CD maxi – Netherlands
1. "Eighteen Strings" (radio edit) – 3:48
2. "Eighteen Strings" (Full On Kitchen mix) – 7:10
3. "Eighteen Strings" (Chris & James remix) – 7:24
4. "Free" (Freedom to Party mix) – 5:07

== Charts ==
=== Weekly charts ===
Chart (1994–1995)	Peak position
Australia (ARIA)	16
Canada Dance/Urban (RPM)	1
Europe (Eurochart Hot 100)	29
Europe (European Dance Radio)	10
Finland (Suomen virallinen lista)	19
Ireland (IRMA)	9
Israel (Israeli Singles Chart)	30
Italy (Musica e dischi)	20
Netherlands (Dutch Top 40)	25
Netherlands (Single Top 100)	21
Scottish Singles Sales (Official Charts)	7
UK Singles (Official Charts)	9
UK Dance (Official Charts)	1
UK Dance (Music Week)	1
UK Club Chart (Music Week)	14
US Maxi-Singles Sales (Billboard)	46

=== Year-end charts ===
Chart (1994)	Position
Canada Dance/Urban (RPM)	30
UK Singles (OCC)	91
