= Tinman =

English house music producer

- Also known as: Dakeyne, DJ Dakeyne
- Born: Paul David Dakeyne; 30 January 1961 (age 65); Hull, East Riding of Yorkshire, England
- Genres: House
- Occupations: Record producer; DJ

Paul David Dakeyne (born 30 January 1961), known by his stage name Tinman, is an English house music producer/remixer from Hull, East Riding of Yorkshire. In 1994, his single "Eighteen Strings" (also written as "18 Strings") became an international club hit. It was rumoured that the original bootleg recording of "Eighteen Strings" contained a sample of the riff from "Smells Like Teen Spirit" by Nirvana, and that the usage of the sample was disallowed, therefore it was reproduced for commercial release. However, the riffs from the bootleg and commercial release were both produced by Dakeyne. The song was a Top 10 hit in both the UK and Ireland.

In addition to this commercial success, Dakeyne also remixed many tracks for DMC which were released on a "DJ Only" basis.

== Singles ==
Year	Single	Chart peak positions			
Year	Single	UK	AUS	IRL	NL
1992	"I Got You (I Feel Good)" (James Brown vs Dakeyne)	72	—	—	—
1993	"Eighteen Strings"	9	16	9	21
1995	"Gudvibe"	49	—	—	—
