= Maxx (group) =

German Eurodance project

- Elyse G Rogers (aka Linda Meek) live on stage as Maxx at Biggest 90s-00s Disco concert Outdoor Fest - Dublin, Ireland (2019)

Background information
- Origin: Berlin, Germany
- Genre: Eurodance
- Years active: 1993–1995; 2016–present
- Labels: Intercord; Blow Up; Remixed Records; Pulse-8 Records; Freshline Music/ A45 Music
- Members: Elyse G. Rogers (aka Linda Meek); George Torpey; The Hitman
- Past members: Boris Köhler (Gary Bokoe - Gary B.); Dakota O'niel; Dawhite; Eliz Yavuz (Alice Montana)

Maxx is a German Eurodance project that was internationally successful in the mid-90s with the hit singles "Get-A-Way", "No More (I Can't Stand It)" and "You Can Get It". The name 'Maxx' is a special acronym for Maximum Xstasy.

== History ==
=== Group origins (1993) ===
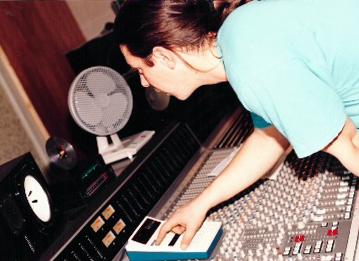
Maxx producer Juergen Wind (George Torpey) in studio (1993)

The Maxx project was the result of the successful but short-lived collaboration between German record producer Juergen Wind (J. Wind) and German music executive David Brunner. After teaming together to release "Another Night" by M.C. Sar & The Real McCoy under Hansa Records/BMG Berlin, Wind and Brunner began collaborating with British songwriter Bruce Hammond Earlam (from Bruce & Bongo) to develop the debut Maxx single "Get-A-Way" under the record label Blow Up/Intercord. Earlam wrote the raggamuffin rap lyrics for the new single while simultaneously teaching Maxx rapper Boris Köhler how to rap in the raggamuffin style. Due to his contractual issues with EMI, he had to write for the project without being publicly credited. For promotional purposes, Köhler received Earlam's songwriting credits. Wind produced the music and wrote the chorus lyrics with his co-producer Frank Hassas. Brunner handled the marketing and promotion of the music and was credited as the Executive Producer. Each team member shared song credits equally. They also used aliases to keep themselves anonymous and to avoid problems with Hansa Records/BMG Berlin. Wind was George Torpey, Brunner was The Hitman, Hassas was Dakota O'niel, Köhler was Gary Bokoe and Real McCoy rapper Olaf Jeglitza was Dawhite. Jeglitza had been falsely tied to the project due to his heavy involvement as a shareholder and as a team member in Wind's production company Freshline Records. In reality, he had no involvement in the production or songwriting of Maxx. The production team name "The Movement" was used in the song credits.

=== Success with "Get-A-Way" and "No More" (1994) ===
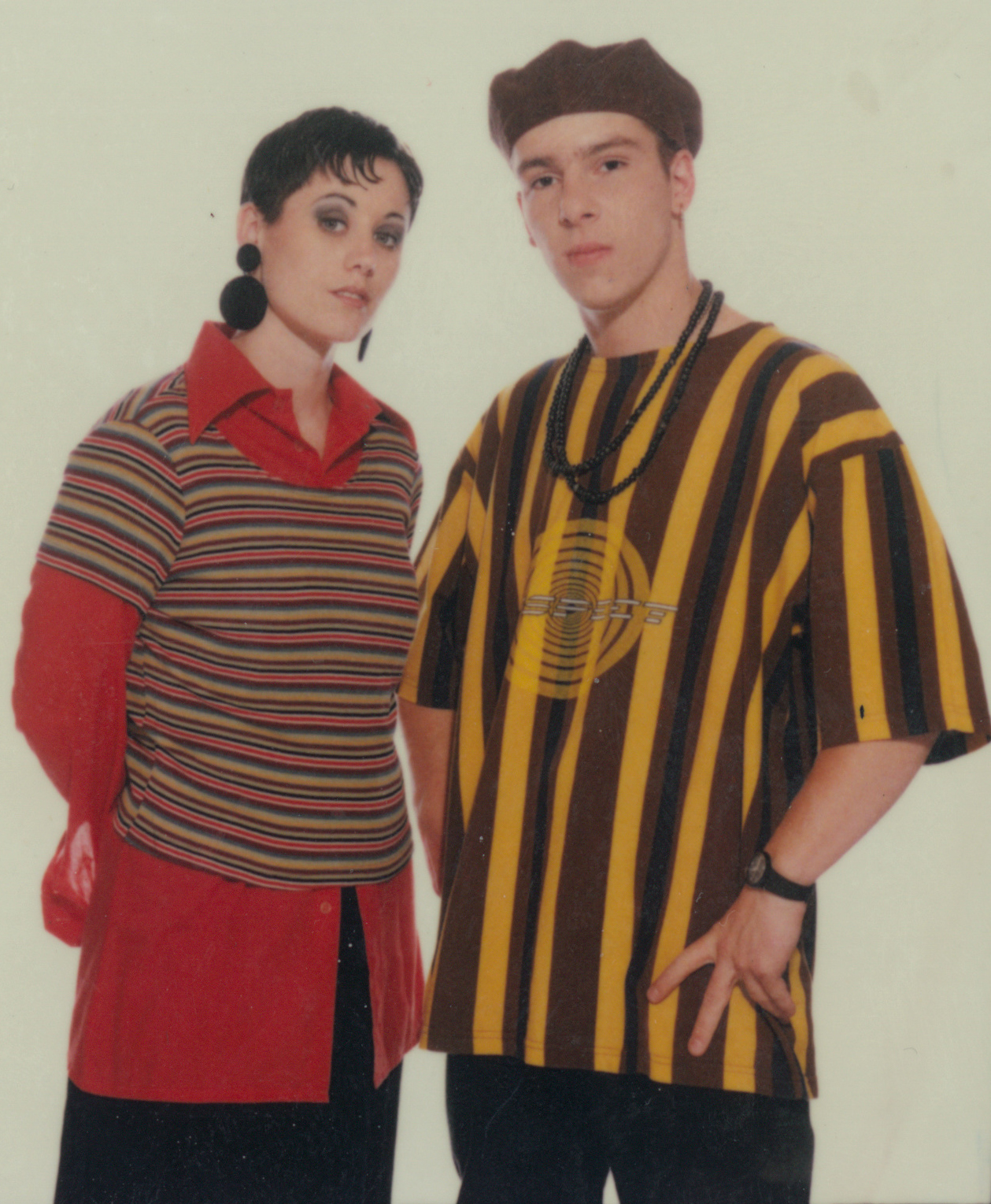
Elyse G Rogers (aka Linda Meek) and Boris Köhler (Gary Bokoe) (1994)

The debut Maxx single "Get-A-Way" featured vocals from Köhler and session singer Samira Bešić. Due to unknown circumstances, Bešić departed the project before filming could begin on the music video for the single. A dancer and model named Eliz Yavuz (Alice Montana) was quickly hired to take Besic's place and mime her vocals for the video. In the early stages of the promotion for the single, Yavuz and Köhler were featured together in the early press materials for Maxx. Yavuz was also briefly advertised as the voice behind the single. When released on 27 October 1993 in Germany, "Get-A-Way" became an overnight success in the country reaching No. 11 on the charts and remaining there for over 26 weeks. It later earned Gold status in Germany for selling over 250,000 units. The single was also a major success in neighbouring countries like Austria where it reached No. 3 and in Switzerland where it reached No. 8. In the United Kingdom, "Get-A-Way" had reached No. 4 on the charts and had later earned Silver status in the country for selling over 200,000 units. The single was reached No. 8 in Ireland. Thanks to the promotional efforts of Remixed Records, the single was an even bigger success in Scandinavia. In Sweden, it charted at No. 3, in Denmark at No. 4, Finland at No. 5, and Norway at No. 8. "Get-A-Way" was also a success in Belgium, The Netherlands and France. The single also managed to peak at No.11 on the Eurochart Hot 100.

After an intense search in Germany for a singer, British singer Linda Meek was discovered early in 1994. After joining the project as the new lead singer, she immediately began performing live shows with Köhler in Europe as Maxx. She then recorded vocals for the follow-up single "No More (I Can't Stand It)" with Köhler in Germany. The new single was officially released on 1 March 1994 and was a big success like its predecessor reaching No. 10 in Germany and the Top 5 in over 18 countries. The success of both singles lead to three recurring appearances on Top of the Pops in the United Kingdom and performances on other major music chart shows like Dance Machine in France, Superclassifica Show in Italy and other televised MTV specials in Europe. By mid-1994, "Get-A-Way" had sold over 1.1 million units across Europe. While Meek didn't originally sing vocals on "Get-A-Way" or appear in the music video for that single, she became associated with the single by the media due to her continuously performing the song live in concert with Köhler. Meek was also featured in various German language pop culture/teen magazines alongside Köhler. In the magazine BRAVO, she was referred to as "Die Stimme von Maxx: Garys neue Partnerin ist Die Engländerin Linda Meek" ("The Voice of Maxx: Gary's New Partner Is the Englishwoman Linda Meek").

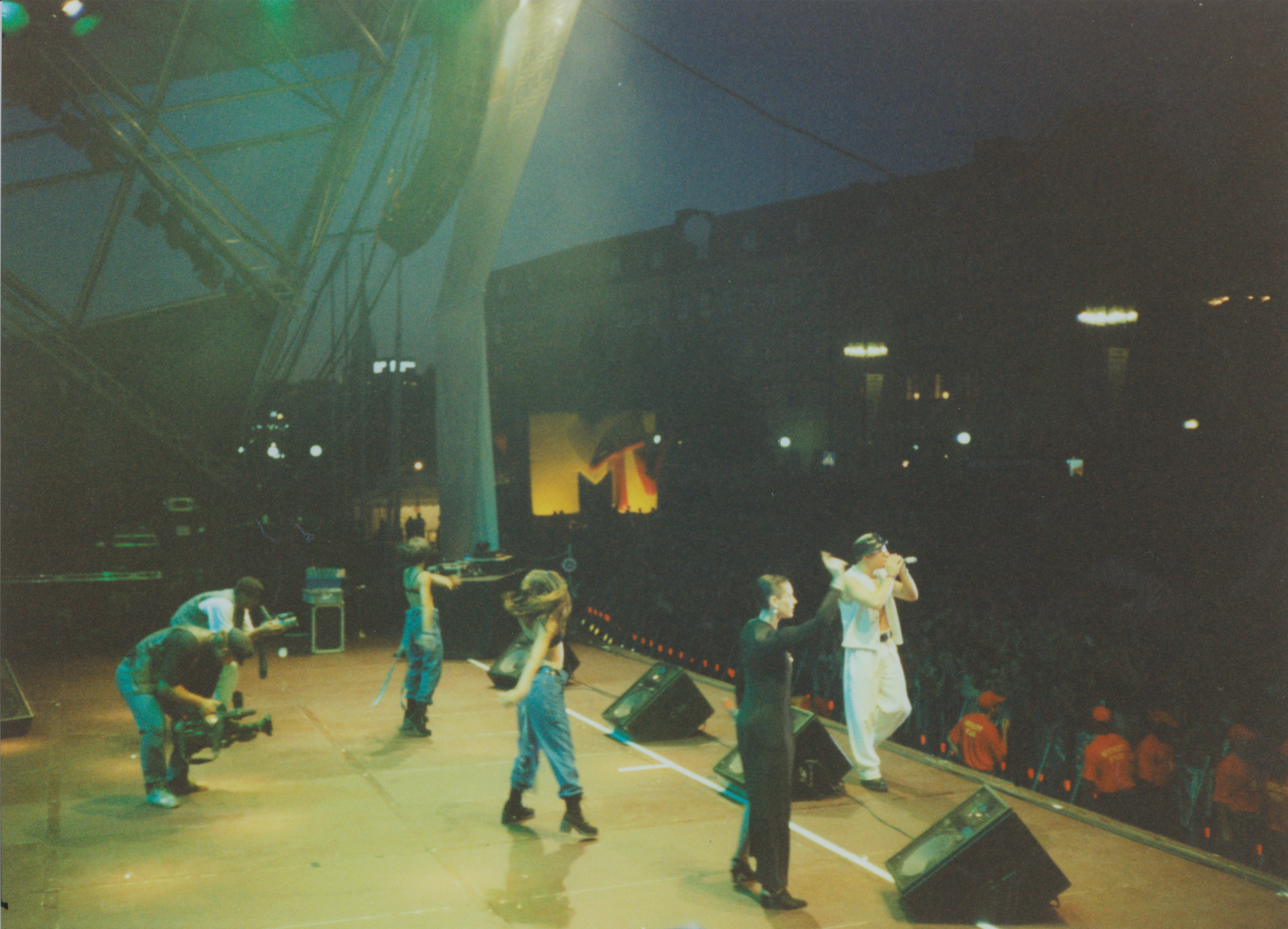
Maxx performing live at the MTV Stockholm Water Festival, Summer (1994)

Following the success of the two Maxx hits, Wind, Hassas and Earlam immediately began work on the debut Maxx album To the Maxximum. A total of thirteen new music tracks were produced for the new album. Wind and Hassas were also simultaneously producing the album Space Invaders, the sophomore album of M.C. Sar & The Real McCoy. To the Maxximum was officially released on 16 June 1994 and had reached No. 22 on the German charts. The album was also a major success in Scandinavia, reaching No.10 in Sweden and No. 6 in Finland. While the album was a commercial success in Europe, it did not match the huge commercial sales of the first two singles. The album reached No. 66 in the United Kingdom.

The Maxx album track "You Can Get It" was then picked to be the third single and was released in September 1994. The single reached No. 21 in the UK and No.13 in Finland. "Get-A-Way" had then peaked at No. 3 on the Canadian dance/urban chart and "No More (I Can't Stand It)" at No. 4. While still commercially successful in Europe, "You Can Get It" did not reach the same level of success as "Get-A-Way" and "No More (I Can't Stand it)." On 31 October 1994, a new Maxx song titled "Power of Love" was released exclusively on a Bravo Hits compilation music CD called Bravo Dance X-Mas.

=== Decline and hiatus (1995) ===
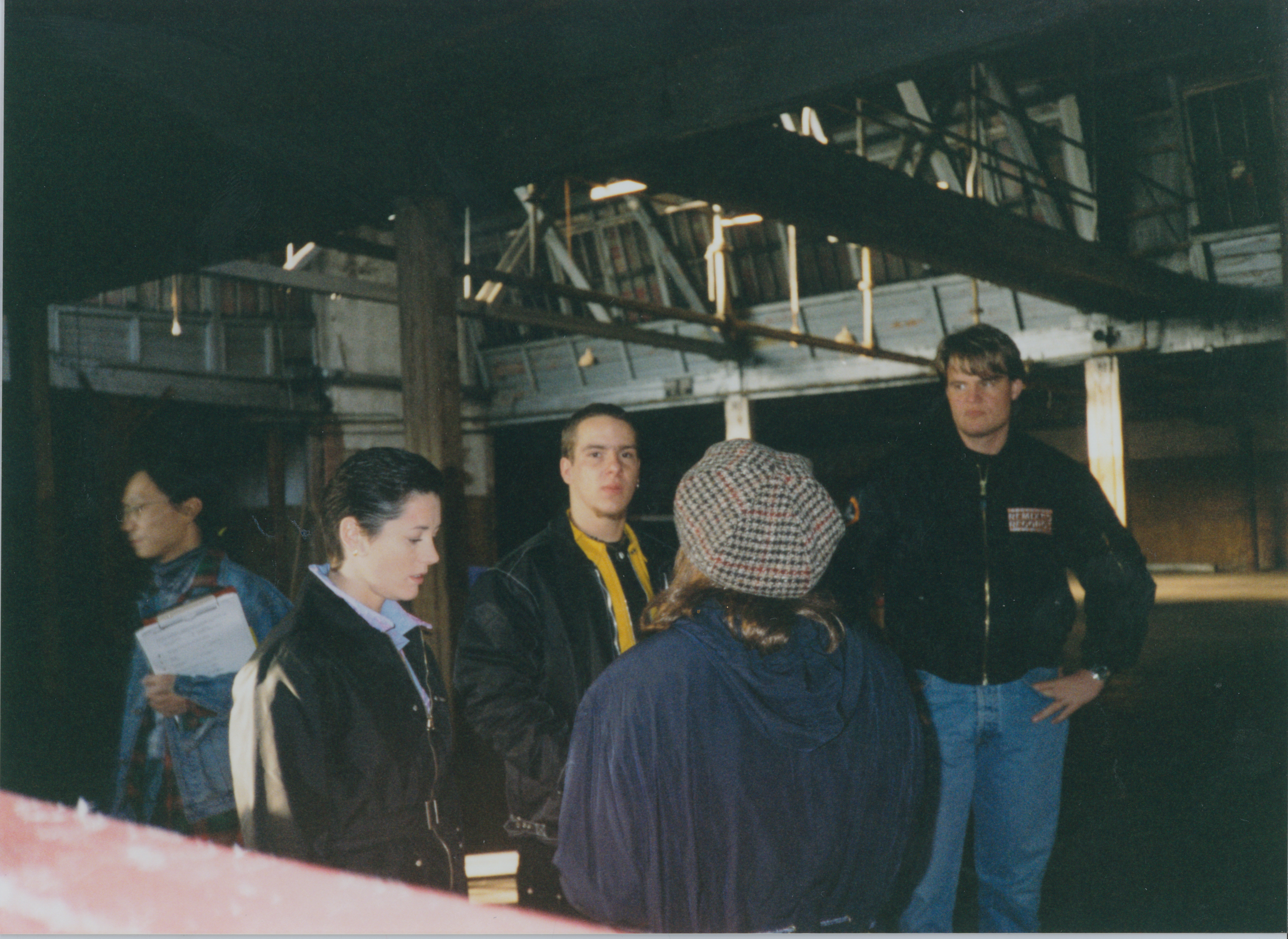
Elyse G Rogers (aka Linda Meek), Boris Köhler (Gary Bokoe) and David Brunner (The Hitman) on the set of "Move Your Body" music video (1995)

The Maxx album track "I Can Make You Feel Like" had been selected to be the fourth single release in May 1995. The single only managed to chart in the United Kingdom peaking at No. 56. The fifth and final Maxx single, "Move Your Body" was released in October 1995. The single heavily sampled the hit song "I Like to Move It" by Reel 2 Real featuring The Mad Stuntman. The single only charted in Austria at No. 18 and in Finland at No.16. A music video for "Move Your Body" was filmed starring Meek and Köhler. The duo also performed the single live on ZDF Television in Germany for the music program Power Vision. Due to creative indifferences and major business disputes within the production and management team behind the scenes, the Maxx project disbanded prematurely in late 1995.

=== Comeback ===
Late in December 2016, an official Maxx website surfaced online announcing the reunion between Meek and the Maxx founders Brunner and Wind after almost two decades. On 25 August 2017, Meek made her comeback performance as Maxx at the We Love the 90's Estonia festival in Tallinn.

Meek is known under her new name Elyse G Rogers; works with the full support and agreement from the original founders of Maxx and continues touring worldwide. Elyse sometimes does live performances and collaborations with other 90s artists on social media.

== Discography ==
=== Studio albums ===
Title	Album details	Peak chart positions						
Title	Album details	GER	AUT	FIN	NETH	SWE	SWI	UK
To the Maxximum	Released: 22 June 1994; Label: Blow Up; Formats: CD, cassette, vinyl	22	32	6	25	10	29	66

=== Singles ===
Title	Year	Peak chart positions										Certifications	Album
Title	Year	GER	AUT	FIN	FRA	IRE	NETH	NOR	SWE	SWI	UK	Certifications	Album
"Get-A-Way"	1993	11	3	5	15	8	3	8	3	8	4	GER: Gold; UK: Silver	To the Maxximum
"No More (I Can't Stand It)"	1994	10	9	2	16	11	6	8	4	12	8		To the Maxximum
"You Can Get It"	1994	—	25	13	28	—	32	—	37	—	21		To the Maxximum
"I Can Make You Feel Like"	1995	—	—	—	—	—	—	—	—	—	56		To the Maxximum
"Move Your Body"	1995	—	18	16	—	—	—	—	—	—	—		Non-album single

=== Compilation features ===
- 1994: "Power of Love" – Bravo Dance X-Mas

=== Remixes ===
- 1993: "Get-A-Way (Remixes)"
- 1993: "Get-A-Way (UK Remixes)"
- 1994: "No More (I Can't Stand It) (Remixes)"
- 1994: "No More (I Can't Stand It) (UK Remixes)"
- 1994: "You Can Get It (Remixes)"
- 2017: "Get-A-Way (Reloaded)"
