= China Black =

British pop-reggae duo

China Black were a British pop-reggae duo, consisting of Simon Fung (songwriter, composer, lyricist, guitarist, keyboardist, arranger and record producer) and Errol Reid (singer-songwriter).

== Overview ==
The band took its name from the different backgrounds of its members. Fung, who is British-Chinese ('China') and Reid, who has Jamaican heritage ('Black').

Their music is typified by heavy, lush string arrangements, gospel choirs, a dance/pop/reggae beat, pizzicato strings and mostly minor chord arrangements on piano.

== Career ==
=== First attempt at success (1992) ===
The group first released the song "Searching" in 1992; it stayed in the reggae chart for 12 weeks at number one and went into the top 5 in the R&B chart. However, the band's indie record label went bankrupt and the track did not chart in the main UK singles chart. After much interest from major record companies, the group signed to Polydor.

=== Second time lucky (1994–1995) ===
1994 in British pop music was notable for a growing reggae/pop crossover trend. Artists such as Ace of Base, Chaka Demus & Pliers and Pato Banton (with the help of UB40) took their radio-friendly "pop/reggae" hits to the top of the UK charts for weeks. There was a resurgence in old reggae favourites; Aswad's popularity and the rise of Shaggy as a global star meant reggae was becoming increasingly mainstream. In July 1994, the newly re-signed group re-released "Searching" on the back of this trend. The song peaked at No. 4 on the UK chart, and stayed inside the top 75 for 16 weeks. China Black's blend of pop and reggae was a radio favourite all summer. "Searching" was also a success across Europe and did particularly well in Japan.

Their second UK single, "Stars", peaked at No. 19 staying in the top 20 for 4 weeks. In February 1995 they released their third charting British single, "Almost See You (Somewhere)", peaking at No. 31. They then released their sole album, Born, which came into the UK Albums Chart at No. 27. They had various Top 10 records in the Far East, Singapore, Malaysia, Thailand and also Europe; particularly France (top 5) and Belgium (three Top 10s). They also had success in South Africa, Germany and Sweden.

"Searching" was used in L'Oréal's television campaign for one of its shampoos for a six-month period and their music was used for arthouse films and TV productions.

The band took a break from promotions and toured around the world extensively. During this time China Black supported international artists like R. Kelly, Sounds of Blackness, Jamiroquai and Dina Carroll. Such was their success that China Black performed a duet with one of their heroes, Barry White, live on the Paris TV show Taratata.

In the summer of 1995, China Black, together with Ladysmith Black Mambazo recorded a cover version of the American folk song "Swing Low, Sweet Chariot" for the official England Rugby World Cup theme. It peaked at No. 15 in the UK, selling 200,000 copies.

However they became involved in a legal dispute with the American side of the record company and were involved in a lengthy lawsuit. When it was eventually resolved after three years, enthusiasm in the band had drastically decreased and although they put out another single, they decided to call it a day.

They sold approximately a million records worldwide and were nominated for a Brit Award for Best British Single in 1995. Among their fans was Princess Diana who invited them to perform at one of her Aids Trust concerts at Wembley Stadium.

=== Post 'China Black' (1998–onwards) ===
Fung turned his attention to songwriting, signing to Peermusic (one of the biggest independent publishers in the world) and working with various producers, writers and artists, such as Blue, Atomic Kitten and Natasha Bedingfield whilst also setting up his own record label as well as TV and film work.

Reid has gone on to become a solo singer/songwriter in his own right working with major dance, soul and reggae producers such as Axwell on Feel The Vibe, Allister Whitehead, DJ Swami, Mafia & Fluxy, Jupiter Ace and The Teamster to name a few. He has also gone on to tour with the likes of Tom Jones as well as, writing the hit song "Please" and touring and singing with Robin Gibb of the Bee Gees around the World. Reid has also set up his own production company which has seen new artist Linda Kiraly signed to Universal Records in New York City and is currently working with his girl group Cinderella Theory on new material.

=== 2005 ===
In the spring of 2005, the band re-emerged on the ITV entertainment show Hit Me, Baby, One More Time.

== Discography ==
=== Albums ===
- Born (1995) – UK No. 27

=== Singles ===
- "Searching" (1994) – UK No. 4, IRE No. 11, SCO No. 8
- "Stars" (1994) – UK No. 19, IRE No. 28
- "Almost See You (Somewhere)" (1995) – UK No. 31
- "Swing Low, Sweet Chariot" (with Ladysmith Black Mambazo) (1995) – UK No. 15
- "Emotions" (1997) – UK No. 79
- "Swing Low Sweet Chariot" (as United Colours of Sound) (2002)
