= The Real Thing (Tony Di Bart song) =

1993 single by Tony Di Bart

Single by Tony Di Bart

from the album Falling for You
- Released: 1993
- Genre: House; dance-pop
- Length: 3:54
- Label: Cleveland City Blues
- Songwriters: Tony Di Bart; Andrew Blissett; Lucinda Drayton
- Producer: The Joy Brothers

Tony Di Bart singles chronology
| "The Real Thing" (1993) | "Do It" (1994) |

Music video
- "The Real Thing" on YouTube

"The Real Thing" (also known as "The Real Thing (If I Can't Have You)") is a song by British singer-songwriter Tony Di Bart, released in 1993 and re-released in March 1994 by Cleveland City Blues. Co-written by Di Bart, the song both topped the UK Singles Chart following its 1994 re-release and became a top-20 hit in Belgium, France, Ireland, and Spain the same year. In North America, it entered the top 40 on the US Billboard Dance Club Play chart while peaking at number three on the Canadian RPM Dance chart. The accompanying music video was filmed in Spain. "The Real Thing" earned a nomination for Tune of the Year at the 1994 International Dance Awards. In 1996, the song was included on Di Bart's only album, Falling for You.

== Background and release ==
Di Bart was working as a bathroom salesman and plumber in Buckinghamshire when he recorded and released "The Real Thing". It was written by Di Bart, Andy Blissett and Lucinda Drayton.

Originally released in 1993, the song failed to appear on the UK Singles Chart. However, a remixed version was released on 28 March 1994 and spent a week at number one on the UK Singles Chart in May 1994. It debuted at number 13 for the week beginning 9 April, climbing slowly to reach number one on 7 May. It also earned label Cleveland City its first top-20 pop hit in the UK. Radio was slow to pick up on the single, and a music video was not produced for the song until it had reached number one in the UK. Club play built interest to a significant level.

The remix also found success in countries outside the UK, becoming a top-10 hit in Belgium, Finland and Israel, and a top-20 hit in France, Ireland, Italy, and Spain. It also reached the top 30 in the Netherlands and the top 50 in Germany. On the Eurochart Hot 100 and European Dance Radio chart, "The Real Thing" reached numbers eight and two, respectively. In North America, the single peaked at number 35 on the US Billboard Hot Dance Club Play chart and number three on the Canadian RPM Dance/Urban chart.

== Critical reception ==
Alexis Petridis from The Guardian said that "The Real Thing" "is an authentically fantastic pop record: in a world of euphoria, it sounded strangely wistful and muted, its melancholy chafing against its plasticky bedroom production." In his weekly UK chart commentary, James Masterton described the song as "a pleasant, poppy piece of soul". Pan-European magazine Music & Media wrote, "It's the combination of the fast bassline like Grandmaster Flash's 'White Lines' with Di Bart's slow soulful vocals that does it." Radio Number One FM/Istanbul programmer Alpay Kasicki stated that this type of pop dance happens to be very popular in Turkey, "We try to cover everything, but this is the people's taste. It was played 25 times in its first two weeks on our playlist. I'm sure Di Bart will follow in the footsteps of Haddaway and Culture Beat."

Andy Beevers from Music Week's RM Dance Update noted that "it has now become a permanent fixture in many DJs' boxes". He said about the 1994 remix, "They retain the excellent catchy vocals and back them up wlth a more complete club track. It builds from an almospheric piano and synth intro with leasing snatches of beats into a driving epic with blg breakdowns." In his weekly RM dance column, James Hamilton, described it as "last autumn's mournfully moaned light floater now faster like its old B-side in blippily swirled plonking fluttery 0-128.8bpm Joy Brothers Remake".

== Music video ==
The music video for "The Real Thing" was filmed on location in the Canary Islands, Spain, specifically Lanzarote, featuring beaches, volcanic landscapes, and a wind sculpture. Throughout the video, a female appears on different sites. Di Bart told on Twitter in 2020, that she was a friend of the director who shot the video. "The Real Thing" received "prime break out" rotation on MTV Europe in June 1994. The following month, it was B-listed on German music television channel VIVA. In October 1994, it was also B-listed on France's MCM.

== Impact and legacy ==
"The Real Thing" received a nomination for Tune of the Year at the 1994 International Dance Awards in London. The Guardian included the song in their "60 years of No 1 singles – The best No 1 records" in 2012. Tomorrowland featured the song in their official list of "The Ibiza 500" in 2020.

== Track listings ==
=== 1993 release ===
- UK 12-inch blue vinyl single

A1. "The Real Thing"
B1. "The Real Thing" (dance mix)
B2. "The Real Thing" (underground mix)

=== 1994 release ===
- UK 7-inch single

A. "The Real Thing" (new 7-inch dance)
B. "The Real Thing" (new 7-inch radio)

- UK 12-inch single

A1. "The Real Thing" (The Joy Brothers remake)
B1. "The Real Thing" (7-inch remake)
B2. "The Real Thing" (original dance mix)

- UK CD single
1. "The Real Thing" (new 7-inch dance)
2. "The Real Thing" (new 7-inch radio)
3. "The Real Thing" (new 12-inch dance)
4. "The Real Thing" (original 12-inch dance)
5. "The Real Thing" (12-inch dub mix)
- Dutch 12-inch single

A1. "The Real Thing" (house mix) – 6:32
B1. "The Real Thing" (new 12-inch dance mix) – 7:17
B2. "The Real Thing" (dub underground mix) – 5:15

- French CD single
1. "The Real Thing" (new dance mix) – 3:51
2. "The Real Thing" (new radio mix) – 3:54
- Spanish maxi-CD single
1. "The Real Thing" (new 7-inch dance)
2. "The Real Thing" (original 12-inch dance)
3. "The Real Thing" (12-inch dub mix)
4. "The Real Thing" (new 12-inch dance)
5. "The Real Thing" (new 7-inch radio)

== Charts ==
=== Weekly charts ===
| Chart (1993) | Peak position |
|---|---|
| UK Club Chart (Music Week) | 19 |

| Chart (1994) | Peak position |
|---|---|
| Australia (ARIA) | 193 |
| Belgium (Ultratop 50 Flanders) | 4 |
| Canada Dance/Urban (RPM) | 3 |
| Europe (Eurochart Hot 100) | 8 |
| Europe (European Dance Radio) | 2 |
| Europe (European Hit Radio) | 13 |
| Finland (Suomen virallinen lista) | 7 |
| France (SNEP) | 13 |
| Germany (GfK) | 44 |
| Ireland (IRMA) | 13 |
| Israel (Israeli Singles Chart) | 7 |
| Italy (Musica e dischi) | 20 |
| Netherlands (Dutch Top 40) | 23 |
| Netherlands (Single Top 100) | 32 |
| Scottish Singles Sales (Official Charts) | 1 |
| Spain (AFYVE) | 13 |
| UK Singles (Official Charts) | 1 |
| UK Airplay (Music Week) | 3 |
| UK Dance (Music Week) | 1 |
| UK Club Chart (Music Week) | 6 |
| US Dance Club Play (Billboard) | 35 |

=== Year-end charts ===
| Chart (1994) | Position |
|---|---|
| Belgium (Ultratop 50 Flanders) | 28 |
| Canada Dance/Urban (RPM) | 34 |
| Europe (Eurochart Hot 100) | 79 |
| Europe (European Dance Radio) | 21 |
| Israel (Israeli Singles Chart) | 27 |
| Netherlands (Dutch Top 40) | 180 |
| UK Singles (OCC) | 32 |
| UK Airplay (Music Week) | 17 |

== Certifications ==
| Region | Certification | Certified units/sales |
|---|---|---|
| United Kingdom (BPI) | Silver | 200,000^{^} |
^{^} Shipments figures based on certification alone.
