= Compliments on Your Kiss =

1994 single by Red Dragon

- International cover artwork

Single by Red Dragon featuring Brian and Tony Gold
- B-side: "Beat Up" (by Taxi Gang)
- Released: 18 July 1994
- Genre: Reggae; jazz
- Length: 4:09; 3:30 (radio edit)
- Label: Mango
- Songwriters: Sly Dunbar; Winston Harris; Leroy May
- Producers: Robbie Shakespeare; Taxi; Sly Dunbar

Audio
- "Compliments on Your Kiss" on YouTube

"Compliments on Your Kiss" is a jazz-reggae song by Jamaican deejay Red Dragon featuring Jamaican reggae duo Brian and Tony Gold. The song was written by Sly Dunbar, Winston Harris, and Red Dragon (under his real name, Leroy May), and it was produced by Sly and Robbie and Taxi. One of the song's B-sides, "Beat Up", is performed by Sly and Robbie under the name Taxi Gang.

The single was released on 18 July 1994 by Taxi and Mango Records and became Red Dragon's most successful international hit. It peaked at number two on the UK Singles Chart on 28 August 1994 and ended the year as the 27th-most-successful single in the UK. It also experienced success outside the UK, reaching the top 20 in Australia, Ireland, the Netherlands, and New Zealand. Several reviewers have attributed the song's success to the popularity of other radio-friendly reggae musicians at the time, including Dawn Penn and Chaka Demus & Pliers.

== Critical reception ==
In a review of the song, Music & Media magazine called "Compliments on Your Kiss" "as harmless as Puff the magic dragon" and complimented the song's Caribbean ambiance. A spokesman of British radio station Capital FM said of the song, "It's a good, fun, catchy pop tune". Record Mirror editor James Hamilton named it a "Sly & Robbie produced delightful doo-wop style summery 137.8/68.9bpm reggae crossover using the uncredited tune of Elvis Presley's 'Lover Doll' (which could prove expensive!)" in his weekly dance column.

== Track listings ==
- Jamaican 7-inch single

A. "Compliment on Your Kiss"
B. "Beat Up" (performed by Taxi Gang)

- Standard international single
1. "Compliments on Your Kiss" – 3:30
2. "Compliments on Your Kiss" (instrumental) – 4:09
3. "Compliments on Your Kiss" (Straight mix) – 4:09
4. "Compliments on Your Kiss" (acapella) – 4:09

== Charts ==
=== Weekly charts ===
Chart (1994–1995)	Peak position
Australia (ARIA)	18
Belgium (Ultratop 50 Flanders)	25
Europe (Eurochart Hot 100)	8
Europe (European Hit Radio)	24
Iceland (Íslenski Listinn Topp 40)	25
Ireland (IRMA)	11
Netherlands (Dutch Top 40)	20
Netherlands (Single Top 100)	20
New Zealand (Recorded Music NZ)	20
Scotland Singles (OCC)	6
UK Singles (OCC)	2
UK Airplay (Music Week)	10

=== Year-end charts ===
Chart (1994)	Position
UK Singles (OCC)	27
UK Airplay (Music Week)	43

== Certifications ==
Region	Certification	Certified units/sales
Australia (ARIA)	Gold	35,000^{^}
United Kingdom (BPI)	Silver	200,000^{^}
^{^} Shipments figures based on certification alone.

== Release history ==
Region	Date	Format(s)	Label(s)	Ref(s).
United Kingdom	18 July 1994	12-inch vinyl; CD; cassette	Mango	
United Kingdom	25 July 1994	7-inch vinyl	Mango	
Australia	15 August 1994	7-inch vinyl	Mango	
Australia	7 November 1994	Cassette	Mango	
