= Tony Di Bart =

English singer (born 1964)

- Born: Antonio Carmine Di Bartolomeo; 24 August 1964 (age 62); Slough, Buckinghamshire, England
- Occupation: Singer
- Years active: 1993–present

Antonio Carmine Di Bartolomeo (born 24 August 1964, Slough, Buckinghamshire – now Berkshire, England) is an English singer performing under the stage name Tony Di Bart. Di Bart is best known for his single "The Real Thing" which reached number one on the UK Singles Chart in 1994.

Di Bart began his career as a bathroom salesman in Iver, Buckinghamshire, before achieving chart success. He topped the charts in the United Kingdom for one week during May 1994, with a remixed version of his co-written release from November 1993, "The Real Thing".

Di Bart's subsequent singles did not achieve the same level of commercial success. He still makes appearances when requested, and was one of the judges at a village fete in Iver, Buckinghamshire, in July 2013 and in Skegness, Lincolnshire, in 2014, as he continues to promote "The Real Thing".

In June 2023, Di Bartolomeo was found guilty at Reading Magistrates' Court of assaulting a police officer.

== Singles ==
Year	Single	Peak chart positions							Album
Year	Single	UK	AUS	BEL	FRA	GER	IRE	NLD	Album
1993	"The Real Thing"	1	193	4	13	44	13	32	Falling for You
1994	"Do It"	21	—	10	86	—	—	—	Falling for You
1995	"Why Did Ya"	46	—	—	—	—	—	—	Falling for You
1996	"Turn Your Love Around"	66	174	40	—	—	—	44	Falling for You
1997	"We Got the Love"	—	—	—	—	—	—	—	Falling for You
1997	"Love U More"	—	—	—	—	—	—	—	Falling for You
1998	"The Real Thing Remix"	51	—	—	—	—	—	—	Falling for You
2000	"I'll Take You There"	—	—	—	—	—	—	—	Non-album singles
2002	"Breaking My Heart"	—	—	—	—	—	—	—	Non-album singles
2004	"I Live for You"	—	—	—	—	—	—	—	Non-album singles
