= Red Dragon (musician) =

- Also known as: Redman
- Born: Leroy May; March 18, 1966; Kingston, Jamaica
- Died: July 31, 2015 (aged 49) Kingston, Jamaica
- Genres: Reggae, dancehall
- Years active: Early 1980s–2015
- Labels: Techniques, Dragon, VP

Leroy May (18 March 1966 – 31 July 2015), better known as Red Dragon and initially as Redman, was a Jamaican deejay who was active starting in the early 1980s.

== Biography ==
Born in Kingston, Jamaica, May deejayed with several sound systems in the early 1980s, including Barrington Hi Fi, Stone Love, People's Choice, and his own Rambo Mango, initially working under the name Redman. His "Laughing Dragon" dubplate became popular, prompting a change of stage name to Red Dragon. Early recordings included "Computer" for producer Charlie Chaplin, "Nah Get Nutten" for Harry J, and his first big hit "Hol' a Fresh" for Winston Riley. He went on to record for King Tubby and King Jammy, and in 1989 his debut album was released, a split LP with his brother, the deejay Flourgon. He also started his own Dragon label, and moved into production, and helped to nurture the early careers of artists such as Buju Banton and Terry Ganzie. In the early 1990s, he returned to recording, enjoying hits with a variety of producers including Riley, Bobby Digital, and Sly & Robbie, and had a major hit single along with Brian & Tony Gold with "Compliments on Your Kiss" in 1994, the single reaching number two on the UK Singles Chart.

May died on 31 July 2015 at the University Hospital of the West Indies after being ill for some time. Leroy 'Red Dragon' May is survived by a spouse, three children, three brothers and one sister.

== Discography ==
=== Albums ===
- Red Dragon vs. Flourgon (1989), Techniques
- Pum Pum Shorts (1992), Dragon
- Good Old College (1992), VP
- Bun Them (1994), VP
- Rusty Magnum (1998), Slammin

=== Singles ===
List of singles, with selected chart positions and certifications
Title	Year	Peak chart positions					Certifications
Title	Year	AUS	BEL (FL)	NLD	NZ	UK	Certifications
"Compliments on Your Kiss" (featuring Brian and Tony Gold)	1994	18	25	20	20	2	ARIA: Gold; BPI: Silver
