= No More (I Can't Stand It) =

1994 single by Maxx

Single by Maxx

from the album To the Maxximum
- Released: March 1994
- Genre: Eurodance; ragga
- Length: 3:45
- Label: Blow Up; Intercord
- Songwriters: Dakota O'Neil; Dawhite; Gary Bokoe; George Torpey; The Hitman
- Producer: The Movement

Maxx singles chronology
"Get-A-Way" (1993)	"No More (I Can't Stand It)" (1994)	"You Can Get It" (1994)

Music video
- "No More (I Can't Stand It)" on YouTube

"No More (I Can't Stand It)" is a song by German Eurodance project Maxx. It was released in March 1994 through the labels Blow Up and Intercord as the second single from their debut album, To the Maxximum (1994). The singer on the song is Linda Meek after that Samira Besic did not participate further in Maxx, after "Get-A-Way". "No More" was written by Dakota O'Neil, Dawhite, Gary Bokoe, George Torpey and The Hitman, and it was produced by the Movement. The single was a hit on the charts across Europe, peaking at number eight on the UK Singles Chart. It also charted in Australia, Canada, Israel and Japan. The accompanying music video was directed by Jonathan Bate and filmed in France.

== Composition ==
A&R man of Intercord's Blow Up, Andy Kappel, told in a 1994 interview about the song and its similarity to "Get-A-Way", "According to the 'never change a winning team' motto, a second single may be exactly the same as the first. But then you have to watch out, you have to keep on looking for something new. There's hardly any difference between most Euro dance product made in Germany anymore. The hook line is very important, as we want to sell singles. From there you can think of selling albums. That's why Blow Up product has such a commercial sound. The production teams [like DMP] I work with have to keep the average German disco in mind. The people here like to dance to 130-140 BPM songs with a good melody. But now we're almost at the end of this style."

== Critical reception ==
Robbert Tilli from Music & Media wrote that the follow-up to "Get-A-Way" "is more of the same—Euro dance with a synth hook, male rap and female chorus." James Hamilton from Music Week's RM Dance Update described the song as a "fluttery galloper" in his weekly dance column. Pete Stanton from Smash Hits complimented it as "a blinding ragga corker" in his review of the album To the Maxximum.

== Chart performance ==
In Europe, "No More (I Can't Stand It)" entered the top 10 in Austria, Belgium, Denmark, Finland, Germany, the Netherlands, Norway, Sweden and the United Kingdom, as well as on the Eurochart Hot 100 and European Dance Radio charts, reaching numbers nine and five in June and September 1994, respectively. In the UK, it peaked at number eight during its second week on the UK Singles Chart, on 7 August 1994. Additionally, "No More (I Can't Stand It)" was a top-20 hit in France, Ireland and Switzerland. Outside Europe, the song peaked at number three on the Canadian RPM Dance chart and was a top-10 hit in Israel and Japan. In Israel, it peaked at number five in its second week on the chart, on 17 December 1994.

== Music video ==
"Yes. The exposure I received from the Maxx music videos 'No More' and 'You Can Get It' got me recognized in a big way. Performing on all the major dance charts shows on television also gave me major exposure as well. Even today people still ask me "hey are you that girl with the short hair from that Maxx music videos?"

— Singer Linda Meek talking about the music video.

The music video for "No More (I Can't Stand It)" was directed by Jonathan Bate and filmed in Marseille, France. It was A-listed on German music television channel VIVA and received "break out" rotation on MTV Europe in June 1994.

== Track listing ==
All lyrics are written by Dakota O'Neil, Dawhite, Gary Bokoe, George Torpey, The Hitman; all music is composed by Dakota O'Neil, Dawhite, George Torpey, The Hitman.

No.	Title	Length
1.	"No More (I Can't Stand It)" (airplay mix)	3:45
2.	"No More (I Can't Stand It)" (club mix)	6:11
3.	"No More (I Can't Stand It)" (Hot mix)	4:42
4.	"No More (I Can't Stand It)" (Welcome to the Terrordome mix)	5:33
5.	"No More (I Can't Stand It)" (Paradise Garage mix)	5:34
6.	"No More (I Can't Stand It)" (Mr. Gee's mix)	4:52
Total length:		30:45

== Credits ==
- Artwork – I-D Büro
- Executive producer – The Hitman
- Lyrics – Dakota O'Neill, Dawhite, Gary Bokoe, George Torpey, The Hitman
- Mixed by – Dee O'Neill (tracks: 1 2 3), George Torpey (tracks: 1, 2, 3)
- Music – Dakota O'Neill, Dawhite, George Torpey, The Hitman (3)
- Photography – B. Kammere
- Producer – The Movement
- Vocals – Linda Meek

== Charts ==
=== Weekly charts ===
Weekly chart performance for "No More (I Can't Stand It)"
Chart (1994)	Peak position
Australia (ARIA)	186
Austria (Ö3 Austria Top 40)	9
Belgium (Ultratop 50 Flanders)	7
Canada Dance/Urban (RPM)	3
Denmark (IFPI)	5
Europe (Eurochart Hot 100)	9
Europe (European Dance Radio)	5
Finland (Suomen virallinen lista)	2
France (SNEP)	16
Germany (GfK)	10
Ireland (IRMA)	11
Israel (Israeli Singles Chart)	5
Netherlands (Dutch Top 40)	6
Netherlands (Single Top 100)	5
Norway (VG-lista)	8
Scottish Singles Sales (Official Charts)	6
Sweden (Sverigetopplistan)	4
Switzerland (Schweizer Hitparade)	12
UK Singles (Official Charts)	8
UK Airplay (Music Week)	38
UK Club Chart (Music Week)	61

=== Year-end charts ===
1994 year-end chart performance for "No More (I Can't Stand It)"
Chart (1994)	Position
Belgium (Ultratop 50 Flanders)	73
Canada Dance/Urban (RPM)	46
Europe (Eurochart Hot 100)	49
Europe (European Dance Radio)	14
Germany (Media Control)	61
Netherlands (Dutch Top 40)	57
Netherlands (Single Top 100)	78
Sweden (Topplistan)	32
UK Singles (OCC)	99

== Release history ==
Release dates and formats for "No More (I Can't Stand It)"
Region	Date	Format(s)	Label(s)	Ref.
Europe	March 1994	—N/a	Blow Up; Intercord	
United Kingdom	25 July 1994	7-inch vinyl; 12-inch vinyl; CD; cassette	Pulse-8	
Australia	17 October 1994	CD; cassette	Possum	
