= Carry Me Home (Gloworm song) =

1994 single by Gloworm

Single by Gloworm
- B-side: "Home"
- Released: 2 May 1994
- Genre: House; gospel; soul
- Length: 3:45
- Label: Go! Beat
- Songwriters: Sedric Johnson; Will Mount
- Producer: Will Mount

Gloworm singles chronology
| "I Lift My Cup (To the Spirit Divine)" (1992) | "Carry Me Home" (1994) | "Young Hearts" (1995) |

Music video
- "Carry Me Home" on YouTube

"Carry Me Home" is a song by gospel house/progressive house group Gloworm, fronted by American singer Sedric Johnson. It features vocals by Pauline Taylor and was co-written by Johnson with producer Will Mount. Released as a single in May 1994 by Go! Beat, it was a top-10 hit in Iceland, Ireland, Norway and the United Kingdom. In the latter nation, "Carry Me Home" peaked at number nine on the UK Singles Chart and number two on the Music Week Dance Singles chart. On the Eurochart Hot 100, it reached number 36 in June 1994. Lindy Heymann directed the accompanying music video, which was filmed in the US and released on 25 April 1994. In the video, the group party in Long Beach, California with family and friends. It received "prime break out" rotation on MTV Europe in June 1994.

== Critical reception ==
British Liverpool Echo described the song as a mixture of house and gospel, that "matches rhythmic piano with big, passionate vocals." Maria Jimenez from pan-European magazine Music & Media described it as "soul powered". She added, "On Rollo's Rushin' Mix, the message is delivered via a fierce house basis of rhythms and grooves and overwhelmingly passionate vocals courtesy of Sedric Johnson." Andy Beevers from Music Week wrote, "This belated follow up to 'Lift My Cup' uses the same formula of Sedric Johnson's strong gospel-influenced soul vocals backed by Rollo's charging house rhythms. Unfortunately the production does not sound as fresh this time around." The Record Mirror Dance Update named it an "excellent return to form". RM editor James Hamilton described it as a "Sedric Johnson groaned Norman Whitfield-goes-Euro type hybrid" in his weekly dance column.

== Track listings ==
- 12-inch single, UK
1. "Carry Me Home" (Rollo's Rushin' mix) — 6:43
2. "Carry Me Home" (Will's Procastinatin' mix) — 6:23
3. "Carry Me Home" (Rollo's Rushin' dub) — 4:57
4. "Home" — 6:46
- CD single, UK and Europe
1. "Carry Me Home" (radio mix) — 3:45
2. "Carry Me Home" (Will's Procrastinatin' mix) — 6:23
3. "Carry Me Home" (Rollo's Rushin' mix) — 6:43
4. "Home" — 7:52
- Cassette single, UK and Europe
1. "Carry Me Home" (radio mix)
2. "Carry Me Home" (Rollo's Rushin' dub)

== Charts ==
=== Weekly charts ===
| Chart (1994) | Peak position |
|---|---|
| Europe (Eurochart Hot 100) | 36 |
| Europe (European Dance Radio) | 25 |
| Europe (European Hit Radio) | 40 |
| Germany (GfK) | 74 |
| Iceland (Íslenski Listinn Topp 40) | 5 |
| Ireland (IRMA) | 8 |
| Israel (Israeli Singles Chart) | 15 |
| Netherlands (Dutch Top 40 Tipparade) | 4 |
| Netherlands (Single Top 100) | 38 |
| Norway (VG-lista) | 9 |
| Scotland (OCC) | 14 |
| UK Singles (OCC) | 9 |
| UK Airplay (Music Week) | 12 |
| UK Dance (Music Week) | 2 |
| UK Club Chart (Music Week) | 17 |

=== Year-end charts ===
| Chart (1994) | Position |
|---|---|
| Iceland (Íslenski Listinn Topp 40) | 73 |
| UK Singles (OCC) | 87 |

== Release history ==
| Region | Date | Format(s) | Label(s) | Ref. |
|---|---|---|---|---|
| United Kingdom | 2 May 1994 | 7-inch vinyl; 12-inch vinyl; CD; cassette | Go! Beat | |
| Australia | 25 July 1994 | CD; cassette | Go! Beat | |
