= Get-A-Way =

1993 single by Maxx

Single by Maxx

from the album To the Maxximum
- Released: 1993
- Genre: Eurodance; ragga; house
- Length: 3:45
- Label: Blow Up; Intercord
- Songwriters: Dakota O'Neill; Dawhite; Gary Bokoe; George Torpey; The Hitman
- Producer: The Movement

Maxx singles chronology
"Get-A-Way" (1993)	"No More (I Can't Stand It)" (1994)

Music video
- "Get-A-Way" on YouTube

Original Scandinavian Release

"Get-A-Way" is a song by German Eurodance project Maxx, released in 1993 by the records labels Blow Up and Intercord as the lead single from the project's first album, To the Maxximum (1994). The song peaked within the top 10 in at least 13 countries and was certified gold In Germany for shipping over 250,000 units. By mid-1994, it sold over 1.1 million singles in Europe. The accompanying music video was directed by Jonathan Bate, and filmed in Sweden.

== Background ==
"Get-A-Way" originally featured vocals by rapper Boris Köhler (Gary Bokoe) and singer Samira Besic. It was inspired by Ice MC's "Take Away the Colour" and became a major club hit in Germany upon release in October 1993. For unknown reasons, Besic did not participate further in Maxx beyond recording vocals for "Get-A-Way." A model-dancer named Eliz Yavuz (Alice Montana) was hired to lip-sync Besic's vocals for the accompanying music video. British singer Linda Meek was later recruited into the act early in 1994. She quickly became associated with "Get-A-Way," by the media due to her regularly performing the song live in concert and on music television programs with Köhler for music programs like Top of the Pops, Dance Machine, MTV and many more.

== Critical reception ==
American magazine Billboard complimented the song as "quality dancefloor music", noting "its creative mixture of reggae, rap and speed muffin." In his weekly UK chart commentary, James Masterton stated, "This record could hardly miss, being a proven formula. Just like Apache Indian's 'Boom-Shack-A-Lack' and Shaggy's 'Oh Carolina' before it, 'Get-A-Way' is a frenetic ragga track, enough to wear out even the most hardened dancer yet commercial enough for radio to love it to death."

Pan-European magazine Music & Media wrote, "This steaming houser has it all: A thumping beat that should get the crippled going, pulsating synthesizers that provide both the slightly ambient melody and the background, and a prominent rap to put the icing on the cake. It definitely has huge international chart potential." James Hamilton from Music Week's RM Dance Update described the song as a "ragga 'white man' and raucous girl chanted cheesy" 2 Unlimited-like galloper in his weekly dance column. Pete Stanton from Smash Hits complimented it as "a blinding ragga corker", naming the album, To the Maxximum, Best New Album.

== Chart performance ==
"Get-A-Way" peaked at number 11 in Germany and entered the top five in Austria, the Czech Republic, Denmark, Finland, the Netherlands, Sweden and the United Kingdom. In the UK, it peaked at number four during its third week on the UK Singles Chart, on 29 May 1994. It stayed at that position for two weeks. On the UK Dance Singles Chart, it reached number five. The single also became a top-10 hit in Belgium, Ireland, Norway and Switzerland. On the Eurochart Hot 100, it reached number 10 in June 1994, during its 23rd week on the chart, after charting in Denmark, France, Ireland and the UK. "Get-A-Way" was later certified with a gold record in Germany for shipping over 250,000 units and a silver record in the UK for shipping over 200,000 units. By mid-1994, the single reached a total of 1.1 million in European commercial sales. Outside Europe, it was a top-10 hit in Japan and on the Canadian RPM Dance chart, where it peaked at number three. In West Asia, it became a top-20 hit in Israel, peaking at number 11 on 22 February 1994. In Australia, it reached number 196.

== Music video ==
The music video for "Get-A-Way" was directed by Jonathan Bate and filmed in Sweden in the winter. It was B-listed on German music television channel VIVA in February 1994. Later, at beginning of March, the video received active rotation MTV Europe, while at end of July 1994, it was A-listed on France's MCM.

The video begins with a man at a cemetery, where he lays down a piece of jewelry on a grave and leaves. Then another scene begins in a parking garage, with several men wearing gas masks, raiding a Securitas van and escaping. A detective, the man from the cemetery, appears on the scene. At the same time a young woman flees with two suitcases, losing a piece of jewelry when she is picked up by a man in a white car. Apparently it's her lover who has been involved in the robbery. The detective finds the jewelry-piece lying on the ground, and starts chasing the couple. They drive through a winter landscape, visiting a petrol station before arriving a caravan in the forest. The detective finds the caravan, and the video ends with the couple returning from a trip in the woods, entering the caravan, unaware that they have been found. Through the video, Gary Bokoe is seen rapping at the scene in the parking garage, surrounded by flashing police lights, police officers and barrier tape. Alice Montana performs the chorus as she walks through the cemetery or sits in the back seat of a car.

== Track listings ==
- CD maxi-single (Europe, 1993)
1. "Get-A-Way" (airplay mix) – 3:45
2. "Get-A-Way" (club mix) – 5:35
3. "Get-A-Way" (Twilight Mix) – 5:33
4. "Get-A-Way" (Get in Trance mix) – 4:49
- CD maxi-single – Remix (Europe, 1994)
1. "Get-A-Way" (2AM Club mix) – 5:21
2. "Get-A-Way" (Piano remix) – 4:59
3. "Get-A-Way" (Naked Eye radio mix) – 4:01

== Charts ==
=== Weekly charts ===
Chart (1993–1994)	Peak position
Australia (ARIA)	196
Austria (Ö3 Austria Top 40)	3
Belgium (Ultratop 50 Flanders)	10
Belgium (VRT Top 30 Flanders)	8
Canada Dance/Urban (RPM)	3
Denmark (Tracklisten)	4
Europe (Eurochart Hot 100)	10
Europe (European Dance Radio)	13
Finland (Suomen virallinen lista)	5
France (SNEP)	15
Germany (GfK)	11
Ireland (IRMA)	8
Israel (Israeli Singles Chart)	11
Netherlands (Dutch Top 40)	3
Netherlands (Single Top 100)	4
Norway (VG-lista)	8
Scottish Singles Sales (Official Charts)	6
Sweden (Sverigetopplistan)	3
Switzerland (Schweizer Hitparade)	8
UK Singles (Official Charts)	4
UK Airplay (Music Week)	14
UK Dance (Music Week)	5
UK Club Chart (Music Week)	66

=== Year-end charts ===
Chart (1994)	Position
Austria (Ö3 Austria Top 40)	19
Belgium (Ultratop 50 Flanders)	76
Europe (Eurochart Hot 100)	25
Germany (Media Control)	49
Netherlands (Dutch Top 40)	38
Netherlands (Single Top 100)	42
Sweden (Topplistan)	16
Switzerland (Schweizer Hitparade)	36
UK Singles (OCC)	50

== Certifications ==
Region	Certification	Certified units/sales
Germany (BVMI)	Gold	250,000^{^}
United Kingdom (BPI)	Silver	200,000^{^}
^{^} Shipments figures based on certification alone.
