= The Shamen discography =

Material released by the Shamen.

== Albums ==
=== Studio albums ===
Title	Album details	Peak chart positions							Certifications (sales thresholds)
Title	Album details	UK	AUS	AUT	GER	NLD	SWE	US	Certifications (sales thresholds)
Drop	Released: 1987; Label: Moksha	—	—	—	—	—	—	—	
In Gorbachev We Trust	Released: 1989; Label: Demon	—	—	—	—	—	—	—	
Phorward	Released: 1989; Label: Moksha	—	—	—	—	—	—	—	
En-Tact	Released: 1990; Label: One Little Indian	31	—	—	—	—	—	138	
Boss Drum	Released: 1992; Label: One Little Indian	3	35	28	72	62	35	—	BPI: Platinum
Axis Mutatis	Released: 1995; Label: One Little Indian	27	162	—	—	—	—	—	
Hempton Manor	Released: 1996; Label: One Little Indian	—	—	—	—	—	—	—	
UV	Released: 1998; Label: Moksha	—	—	—	—	—	—	—	

=== Charted compilation albums ===
Charted compilation albums
Title	Album details	Peak chart positions	
Title	Album details	UK	AUS
Progeny	Released: 1991	23	—
On Air	Released: 1993	61	—
Different Drum	Released: 1993	—	134
The Shamen Collection	Released: 1997	26	137

== Singles ==
Year	Single	Peak chart positions											Album
Year	Single	UK	AUS	BEL	FIN	GER	IRE	NLD	SWE	SWI	US	US Dance	Album
1985	"They May Be Right...But They're Certainly Wrong"	—	—	—	—	—	—	—	—	—	—	—	Drop
1986	"Young Till Yesterday/World Theatre"	—	—	—	—	—	—	—	—	—	—	—	Drop
1987	"Something About You"	—	—	—	—	—	—	—	—	—	—	—	Drop
1987	"Strange Days Dream"	—	—	—	—	—	—	—	—	—	—	—	Drop
1987	"Knature of a Girl"	—	—	—	—	—	—	—	—	—	—	—	Phorward
1987	"Christopher Mayhew Says"	—	—	—	—	—	—	—	—	—	—	—	In Gorbachev We Trust
1988	"Jesus Loves Amerika"	—	—	—	—	—	—	—	—	—	—	—	In Gorbachev We Trust
1988	"Transcendental"	—	—	—	—	—	—	—	—	—	—	—	In Gorbachev We Trust
1989	"You Me & Everything"	—	—	—	—	—	—	—	—	—	—	—	Phorward
1989	"Omega Amigo"	—	—	—	—	—	—	—	—	—	—	—	En-Tact
1990	"Pro-Gen"	55	—	—	—	—	—	—	—	—	—	—	En-Tact
1990	"Make It Mine"	42	—	—	—	—	—	—	—	—	—	1	En-Tact
1991	"Hyperreal"	29	—	—	—	—	—	—	—	—	—	—	En-Tact
1991	"Move Any Mountain"	4	104	8	5	—	17	17	21	4	38	1	En-Tact
1992	"LSI (Love Sex Intelligence)"	6	53	33	1	27	15	20	4	19	—	1	Boss Drum
1992	"Ebeneezer Goode"	1	14	23	8	23	1	26	11	17	—	—	Boss Drum
1992	"Boss Drum"	4	116	47	2	—	5	46	20	22	—	8	Boss Drum
1992	"Boss Drum (Remix)"	58	—	—	—	—	—	—	—	—	—	—	Boss Drum
1992	"Phorever People"	5	63	—	14	31	7	47	14	—	—	1	Boss Drum
1993	"Re:Evolution"	18	—	—	—	—	—	—	—	—	—	—	Boss Drum
1993	"The SOS EP (Comin' On)"	14	120	46	14	—	17	43	—	—	—	—	Boss Drum
1995	"Destination Eschaton"	15	92	—	6	—	—	—	26	—	—	14	Axis Mutatis
1995	"Transamazonia"	28	—	—	19	—	—	—	—	—	—	—	Axis Mutatis
1995	"MK2A"	—	—	—	—	—	—	—	—	—	—	—	Axis Mutatis
1996	"Heal (The Separation)"	31	—	—	—	—	—	—	—	—	—	—	Axis Mutatis
1996	"Indica"	—	—	—	—	—	—	—	—	—	—	—	Hempton Manor
1996	"Move Any Mountain '96"	35	—	—	—	—	—	—	—	—	—	—	Non-album single
1998	"Universal"	—	—	—	—	—	—	—	—	—	—	—	UV

== Music videos ==
Title	Year	Director
"Christopher Mayhew Says"	1987	Jim McNulty for Toad Hall Studios
"Knature of a Girl"	1988	Jim McNulty for Toad Hall Studios
"Jesus Loves Amerika"	1988	
"Omega Amigo"	1989	Chris Craig + Jim Wilson
"Pro>Gen"	1990	Bernard Morales
"Make it Mine"	1990	Chris Craig + Jim Wilson
"Hyperreal"	1990	Mathew Glamorre
"Move Any Mountain – Progen '91"	1991	Mathew Glamorre
"L.S.I.: Love Sex Intelligence"	1991	Mathew Glamorre
"Make It Mine" (Live USA version)	1992	Eric Massey + H. Bomb
"Ebeneezer Goode"	1992	Richard Heslop
"Boss Drum"	1992	Richard Heslop
"Phorever People"	1992	Richard Heslop
"Comin' On"	1993	Nico Beyer
"Destination Eschaton"	1995	Nico Beyer
"Transamazonia"	1995	Richard Heslop
"Heal (The Separation)"	1996	William Latham
