= List of UK Independent Singles Chart number ones of 1992 =

These are UK Official Indie Chart number one hits of 1992.Complied by Music Week

Issue date	Song	Artist	ref
4 January	"Justified & Ancient"	The KLF featuring Tammy Wynette	
11 January	"Justified & Ancient"	The KLF featuring Tammy Wynette	
18 January	"Justified & Ancient"	The KLF featuring Tammy Wynette	
25 January	"Justified & Ancient"	The KLF featuring Tammy Wynette	
1 February	"Justified & Ancient"	The KLF featuring Tammy Wynette	
8 February	"The Bouncer"	Kicks Like A Mule	
15 February	"The Bouncer"	Kicks Like A Mule	
22 February	"Leave Them All Behind"	Ride	
29 February	"The Bouncer"	Kicks Like A Mule	
7 March	"Dragging Me Down"	Inspiral Carpets	
14 March	"America: What Time Is Love?"	The KLF	
21 March	"America: What Time Is Love?"	The KLF	
28 March	"America: What Time Is Love?"	The KLF	
4 April	"Breath of Life"	Erasure	
11 April	"Breath of Life"	Erasure	
18 April	"Evapor 8"	Altern-8	
25 April	"Evapor 8"	Altern-8	
2 May	"Evapor 8"	Altern-8	
9 May	"Please Don't Go"	KWS	
16 May	"Please Don't Go"	KWS	
23 May	"Please Don't Go"	KWS	
30 May	"Please Don't Go"	KWS	
6 June	"Please Don't Go"	KWS	
13 June	"Please Don't Go"	KWS	
20 June	"Abba-esque"	Erasure	
27 June	"Abba-esque"	Erasure	
4 July	"Abba-esque"	Erasure	
11 July	"Abba-esque"	Erasure	
18 July	"Sesame's Treet"	Smart E's	
25 July	"Sesame's Treet"	Smart E's	
1 August	"Sesame's Treet"	Smart E's	
8 August	"Sesame's Treet"	Smart E's	
15 August	"LSI (Love Sex Intelligence)"	The Shamen	
22 August	"LSI (Love Sex Intelligence)"	The Shamen	
29 August	"Rock Your Baby"	KWS	
5 September	"Rock Your Baby"	KWS	
12 September	"Ebeneezer Goode"	The Shamen	
19 September	"Ebeneezer Goode"	The Shamen	
26 September	"Ebeneezer Goode"	The Shamen	
3 October	"Ebeneezer Goode"	The Shamen	
10 October	"Ebeneezer Goode"	The Shamen	
17 October	"Ebeneezer Goode"	The Shamen	
24 October	"I'm Gonna Get You"	Bizarre Inc	
31 October	"I'm Gonna Get You"	Bizarre Inc	
7 November	"I'm Gonna Get You"	Bizarre Inc	
14 November	"Run to You"	Rage	
21 November	"Boss Drum"	The Shamen	
28 November	"Boss Drum"	The Shamen	
5 December	"Boss Drum"	The Shamen	
12 December	"Boss Drum"	The Shamen	
19 December	"Hold Back the Night"	KWS and The Trammps	
26 December	"Phorever People"	The Shamen	

== See also ==
- 1992 in music
