= List of UK Independent Singles Chart number ones of 1991 =

These are the UK Official Indie Chart number-one hits of the 1991 as compiled by Music Week.

Issue date	Song	Artist	ref
5 January	"All Together Now"	The Farm	
12 January	"All Together Now"	The Farm	
19 January	"All Together Now"	The Farm	
26 January	"3 a.m. Eternal"	The KLF	
2 February	"3 a.m. Eternal"	The KLF	
9 February	"3 a.m. Eternal"	The KLF	
16 February	"3 a.m. Eternal"	The KLF	
23 February	"3 a.m. Eternal"	The KLF	
2 March	"(I Wanna Give You) Devotion"	Nomad featuring MC Mikee Freedom	
9 March	"(I Wanna Give You) Devotion"	Nomad featuring MC Mikee Freedom	
16 March	"(I Wanna Give You) Devotion"	Nomad featuring MC Mikee Freedom	
23 March	"Today Forever EP"	Ride	
30 March	"Loose Fit"	Happy Mondays	
6 April	"Loose Fit"	Happy Mondays	
13 April	"Caravan"	Inspiral Carpets	
20 April	"Hyperreal"	The Shamen	
27 April	"Hyperreal"	The Shamen	
4 May	"Get The Message"	Electronic	
11 May	"Last Train to Trancentral"	The KLF	
18 May	"Last Train to Trancentral"	The KLF	
25 May	"Last Train to Trancentral"	The KLF	
1 June	"Last Train to Trancentral"	The KLF	
8 June	"Last Train to Trancentral"	The KLF	
15 June	"Shocked"	Kylie Minogue	
22 June	"Shocked"	Kylie Minogue	
29 June	"Tribal Base"	Rebel MC featuring Tenor Fly and Barrington Levy	
6 July	"Chorus"	Erasure	
13 July	"Chorus"	Erasure	
20 July	"Chorus"	Erasure	
27 July	"Move Any Mountain"	The Shamen	
3 August	"Move Any Mountain"	The Shamen	
10 August	"Move Any Mountain"	The Shamen	
17 August	"Move Any Mountain"	The Shamen	
24 August	"Move Any Mountain"	The Shamen	
31 August	"Move Any Mountain"	The Shamen	
7 September	"Insanity"	Oceanic	
14 September	"Insanity"	Oceanic	
21 September	"Insanity"	Oceanic	
28 September	"Insanity"	Oceanic	
5 October	"Insanity"	Oceanic	
12 October	"Insanity"	Oceanic	
19 October	"Insanity"	Oceanic	
2 November	"Go"	Moby	
9 November	"Go"	Moby	
16 November	"Go"	Moby	
23 November	"Activ 8 (Come With Me)"	Altern-8	
30 November	"Activ 8 (Come With Me)"	Altern-8	
7 December	"Playing with Knives"	Bizarre Inc	
14 December	"Justified & Ancient"	The KLF featuring Tammy Wynette	
21 December	"Justified & Ancient"	The KLF featuring Tammy Wynette	
28 December	"Justified & Ancient"	The KLF featuring Tammy Wynette	

== See also ==
- 1991 in music
