= Jhelisa Anderson =

American singer

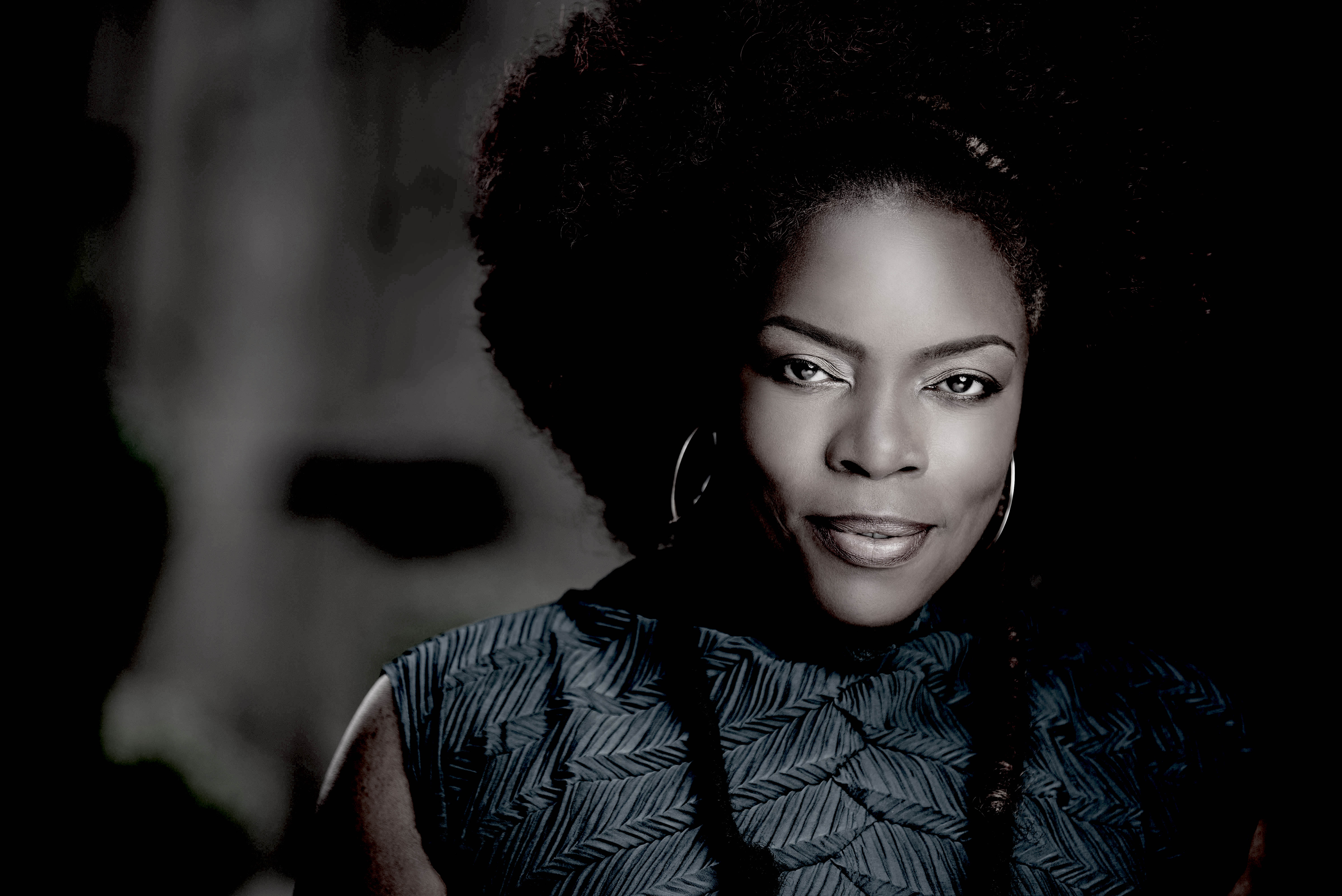

Background information
- Born: Jhelisa Renee Anderson; January 29, 1964 (age 62); Jackson, Mississippi, U.S.
- Genres: Soul, jazz, world, electronic
- Occupations: Recording artist, singer songwriter, producer
- Years active: 1990–present
- Labels: One Little Indian, Dorado, Infracom, Nuphonic
- Member of: The Shamen
- Formerly of: Soul Family Sensation

Jhelisa Anderson (born January 29, 1964) is an American singer, songwriter and producer who has had critical and commercial success both with her own music which covers soul, jazz and music for meditation, and as a vocalist for major artists including Björk, Massive Attack and the Shamen.

== Early life ==
Jhelisa was born on January 29, 1964, in Jackson, Mississippi, United States, and raised in Louisville, Kentucky. From the age of five, Anderson sang with her mother Yvonne Anderson Levington, her sister Pamela and her father David Anderson Jr, a pianist and gospel radio DJ on WLOU radio. Pamela went on to sing with D*Note and Incognito and Jhelisa's cousin Carleen Anderson's parents, Vicki Anderson and Bobby Byrd, were members of James Brown's band.

== Musical career ==
In 1981, she moved to Los Angeles, where she had a job as receptionist at Motown Records. At 19 years old she was hired as a vocal arranger by Motown group PAL whose "Talk We Don't" record was released in 1983. After Motown, she was hired by Capitol Records/EMI where she met Jeff Buckley, who played guitar in her band and recorded on her early demos. The acknowledgements on Buckley's album, Grace, contains the phrase "I love you Jhelisa A".

She moved to London in 1987. In 1989, she signed to One Little Indian Records as part of Soul Family Sensation, and released the critically successful album New Wave and minor hit single "I Don't Even Know If I Should Call You Baby".

She sang backing vocals on Björk's international hit album Debut, stating that she learned her techniques about layering vocals from Chaka Khan, who had called on her for assistance with writing and recording. Chaka Khan recorded Anderson's song "Death of a Soul Diva" in 2002.

Labelmates the Shamen featured Anderson as vocalist on their 1992 album Boss Drum, which reached number three on the UK Albums Chart. She appeared on the singles "Phorever People" and "LSI (Love Sex Intelligence)" which were top ten hits across Europe.

In 1994, she signed to Dorado Records and released her debut solo album, Galactica Rush, which she co-produced with Lee Hamblin and which featured the New York jazz saxophonist Greg Osby and labelmate Outside who produced the tracks "Sweet Dreams" and "World Keeps Turning". Blues & Soul magazine described Galactica Rush as "a class act in every sense" and gave it 9/10. It sold 60,000 copies, according to The Evening Standard. Under the alias Sinden Flowers, Jhelisa provided vocals on some albums by her Dorado labelmates, including "Babel" by D*Note and "The Rough and the Smooth" by Outside.

Language Electric followed in 1997 and was listed as an album of the year in both Echoes and The Face magazines. The Times described Anderson's singing as "simply glorious... a world of lazy beats, where unhurried funk meets cool jazz, a world where evil lurks but where music will help you through". Time Out magazine described her albums as "important precursors to more widely acclaimed debuts by D'Angelo and Maxwell". GQ magazine described her as "the cosmic princess of soul".

She sang on Paul Weller's Stanley Road album in 1995 and Massive Attack called her in for vocals on 2010's Heligoland LP. Traveling through 14 countries around the world delivering music, she has opened for live shows by James Brown, Herbie Hancock and Roy Ayers, and toured with Nitin Sawhney.

She was part-way through making her third album A Primitive Guide to Being There with producer and collaborate Stewart Cararas when Hurricane Katrina hit New Orleans, causing her to leave the city and move closer to family in Atlanta and finish her Nina Simone tribute Sunday in Algiers on her own imprint Rentavibe Records.

In 2018 and 2021, she recorded a collection of meditation music titled 7 Keys Volumes 1 and 2 on Dorado Records.

In June 2022, Anderson released the single "Oxygen", which Gilles Peterson called "extraordinarily brilliant... well worth the wait".

Her film and television work includes Words Like Daggers with The Angel (2020), Hawthorne (2009), and The Leech and the Earthworm (2003).

In 2024, 30 years since Jhelisa released her original version of "Friendly Pressure" and 26 years since Sunship remixed it, the 'In the Sunshine' remix of "Friendly Pressure" became a TikTok phenomenon. Across the year, the track achieved over one billion views on TikTok, nearly 500k creations, a TikTok dance trend and over 500k streams daily. Later that same year, she re-released a remastered Galactica Rush album, to celebrate its 30 years, and released new single "Purpose Love".

== Discography ==
=== Albums ===
- New Wave with Soul Family Sensation (One Little Indian, 1991)
- Boss Drum with the Shamen (One Little Indian, 1992)
- Galactica Rush (Dorado, 1994)
- Language Electric (Dorado, 1997)
- A Primitive Guide to Being There (INFRAcom, 2006)
- Sunday in Algiers (unreleased)
- 7 Keys (Dorado, digital only release, 2018)

=== Collaborations and appearances ===
- Debut with Björk (backing vocals, 1993)
- Mamouna with Bryan Ferry (backing vocals, 1994)
- Give Me a Reason with Mondo Grosso (1995)
- Journeyman Part 1 with Outside (1995)
- Ode to Chaka Khan with Dana Bryant (1996)
- Tryin' Times with Courtney Pine (1997)
- Honey Drunk Drool with APE (2001)
- Find an Oasis with Block 16 (2001)
- Reeling with Da Lata (2003)
- Inner City Life with Re:jazz (2004)
- Seeker with Stanton Warriors (2007)
- Sensor with Davidge (2013)
- Words Like Daggers with The Angel (2020)
