= Destination Eschaton =

1995 single by the Shamen

Single by the Shamen

from the album Axis Mutatis
- Released: 7 August 1995
- Genre: Techno
- Length: 3:55
- Label: One Little Indian
- Songwriters: Colin Angus; Richard West
- Producer: The Shamen

The Shamen singles chronology
| "Phorever People" (1992) | "Destination Eschaton" (1995) | "Transamazonia" (1995) |

Music video
- "Destination Eschaton" on YouTube

"Destination Eschaton" is a song recorded by Scottish band the Shamen, released in August 1995, by One Little Indian, as the first single from the band's sixth album, Axis Mutatis (1995). The song was written by Colin Angus and Richard West, and features vocals by American guest vocalist Victoria Wilson James. It was a hit in several countries in Europe, peaking within the top 10 in Finland and Scotland. In the United States, "Destination Eschaton" reached number 14 on the Billboard Dance Club Play chart. A music video was produced to promote the single, directed by German director Nico Beyer and William Latham, featuring the band performing aboard a spaceship.

== Critical reception ==
In his review of Axis Mutatis, John Bush from AllMusic complimented the song as "enjoyable". Larry Flick from Billboard magazine named it "one of the act's better efforts." Steve Baltin from Cash Box described it as "a futuristic, fast-paced techno assault on the ears." He added, "The Shamen have already set themselves up as hit makers in the clubs, this new single should enjoy similar dance/club success. Particularly impressive is the enunciation they give to the vocals, showing that techno is not just about the beat, but words, as well. However, in this case, the beat is the star." In his weekly UK chart commentary in Dotmusic, James Masterton viewed it as "a well made single".

British-based music and entertainment retailer HMV named it Single of the Week. Paul Lester from Melody Maker wrote, "It sounded like a compelling piece of commercial techno, and it felt good to have Colin Angus, an intelligent pop star and a decent human being to boot, back in the charts." A reviewer from Music & Media commented, "Very misleading—it's not as instantly catchy as their past singles, but rest assured memorability will grow with each spin. The Shamen remain on the top as the most melodic dance outfit." Mark Sutherland from NME said, "Well, they kick of with another E's are good-type number", opining that "the drug-addled witterings on 'Destination Eschaton' weren't even blatant enough for a Daily Mirror story, let alone a Top Ten hit." Garry Mulholland from Select wrote that "it sounds like every other 'Take You Higher' anthem, times ten."

== Track listings ==
- CD single, UK and France
1. "Destination Eschaton" (Beatmasters 7-inch) — 3:55
2. "Destination Eschaton" (Destination Islington) (Shamen Deep Melodic Techno Mix) — 6:40
- CD single, US
1. "Destination Eschaton" (Album Version) — 3:55
2. "Destination Eschaton" (Vission Lorimer Dome Mix) — 4:16
3. "Destination Eschaton" (Hardfloor 12-inch Vocal – Destination Krefeldton) — 7:25
4. "Destination Eschaton" (Shamen Deep Melodic Techno Mix – Destination Islington) — 6:40
5. "Destination Eschaton" (Sounds of Life Vocal Mix) — 6:47
- CD maxi, Europe
1. "Destination Eschaton" (Destination Nemeton original version) — 6:47
2. "Destination Eschaton" (Shamen Deep Melodic Techno Mix) (Destination Islington) — 6:40
3. "Destination Eschaton" (Shamen Acid) (Escacid) — 5:55
4. "Destination Eschaton" (Hardfloor Vocal) (Destination Krefeldton) — 7:25
5. "Destination Eschaton" (Hardfloor Instrumental) (Destination Komotion) — 7:22

== Charts ==
=== Weekly charts ===
| Chart (1995) | Peak position |
|---|---|
| Australia (ARIA) | 92 |
| Europe (Eurochart Hot 100) | 60 |
| Europe (European Dance Radio) | 3 |
| Finland (Suomen virallinen lista) | 6 |
| Israel (Israeli Singles Chart) | 7 |
| Lithuania (M-1) | 37 |
| Scottish Singles Sales (Official Charts) | 9 |
| Sweden (Sverigetopplistan) | 26 |
| UK Singles (Official Charts) | 15 |
| UK Airplay (Music Week) | 25 |
| US Dance Club Play (Billboard) | 14 |

=== Year-end charts ===
| Chart (1995) | Position |
|---|---|
| Europe (European Dance Radio) | 12 |

== Release history ==
| Region | Date | Format(s) | Label(s) | Ref. |
|---|---|---|---|---|
| United Kingdom | 7 August 1995 | CD; cassette | One Little Indian | |
| Australia | 11 September 1995 | CD; cassette | Dance Pool | |
| United States | 19 September 1995 | Contemporary hit radio | Epic | |
