= Anywayawanna =

1989 studio album by The Beatmasters

Studio album by the Beatmasters
- Released: 1989
- Genre: House; hip house
- Label: Rhythm King
- Producer: The Beatmasters

The Beatmasters chronology
Anywayawanna (1989)	Life & Soul (1991)

Anywayawanna is the debut studio album by English dance and electronic music group the Beatmasters. It was released in 1989 on the Rhythm King record label. It should not be confused with their 2004 compilation album, Anywayawanna – The Best of the Beatmasters, which features similar artwork.

== Singles ==
The album includes five singles: "Rok da House", featuring the Cookie Crew (UK No. 5), "Burn It Up", featuring P. P. Arnold (UK No. 14), "Who's in the House?" (UK No. 8), "Hey DJ/I Can't Dance to That Music You're Playing", which features Betty Boo (credited as MC Betty Boop on the album) (UK No. 7), and "Warm Love", featuring Claudia Fontaine (UK No. 51).

== Critical reception ==
Professional ratings
Review scores
Source	Rating
AllMusic	4/5 stars
New Musical Express	6/10

In a retrospective review for AllMusic, Keith Farley described the album as "a kinetic journey through sampledelic house" and "a great production with none of the wide-open gaps and overly raw grooves that characterize most British house of the day."

== Track listing ==
All tracks written by Paul Carter, Manda Glanfield and Richard Walmsley, except where noted.

No.	Title	Writer(s)	Length
1.	"Who's in the House?" (featuring Merlin)	Carter; Glanfield; Walmsley; Merlin	3:59
2.	"Hey DJ/I Can't Dance to That Music You're Playing" (featuring MC Betty Boop a.k.a. Betty Boo)	Carter; Glanfield; Walmsley; Deke Richards; Debbie Dean; Alison Clarkson	3:31
3.	"Burn It Up (On the Groove Tip)" (featuring P. P. Arnold)	Carter; Glanfield; Walmsley; P. P. Arnold	4:26
4.	"Warm Love" (featuring Claudia Fontaine)		6:05
5.	"Ska Train" (featuring Jum Jum)		4:52
6.	"Rok da House (W.E.F.U.N.K.)" (featuring the Cookie Crew)	Carter; Glanfield; Walmsley; Debbie Pryce; Susan Banfield	3:48
7.	"Make Me Feel" (featuring P. P. Arnold)		4:01
8.	"Don't Stop the Beat" (featuring MC Triple O)		4:17
9.	"Midnight Girl" (featuring Eric Robinson)		5:11
10.	"Sarayet-Sayam Sembtaé (Pt.1)"		5:14
11.	"Rok tha House" (7" Original)	Carter; Glanfield; Walmsley; Pryce; Banfield	3:54
12.	"Burn It Up" (7" Original Radio Edit)	Carter; Glanfield; Walmsley; Arnold	3:20

Note

- Tracks 11 and 12 appear on CD only.

== Personnel ==
=== Musicians ===
- The Beatmasters – primary artist, producer
- P. P. Arnold – guest artist, vocals
- Chris Ballin – background vocals
- Betty Boo – guest artist, vocals
- Cookie Crew – guest artist
- Claudia Fontaine – vocals, background vocals
- Derek Green – background vocals
- Merlin – guest artist
- Trevor Russell – vocals
- Barbara Snow – trumpet
- Luke Tunney – trumpet
- Caron Wheeler – background vocals

=== Production ===
- The Beatmasters – producer
- Geoff Peche – mastering
- Martin Rex – engineer
- Mark "Spike" Stent – engineer
- Stephen Taylor – engineer

== Charts ==
Chart performance for Anywayawanna
Chart (1989)	Peak position
Australian Charts (ARIA)	129
UK Albums (OCC)	30

== Certifications ==
Region	Certification	Certified units/sales
United Kingdom (BPI)	Silver	60,000^{^}
^{^} Shipments figures based on certification alone.
