= Beatmasters =

English electronic music group

The Beatmasters
- Origin: London, England
- Genres: House; hip house; dance-pop
- Years active: 1986–present
- Labels: Rhythm King; SBK; EMI; London; ARS Entertainment Belgium Loverush Digital; Sire; Warner Bros.

The Beatmasters are an English electronic music group who gained success in the UK in the late 1980s with four top 20 hit singles. They then went on to produce and remix records for other artists, including Pet Shop Boys, Erasure and Marc Almond. The group's string of chart hit singles include "Burn It Up", "Hey DJ! (I Can't Dance to that Music You're Playing)", "Who's in the House" (featuring Merlin) and "Rok da House". The latter, having been recorded in 1986, is one of the earliest examples of hip house and most likely the first song of the genre. Hip house is a subgenre of house music which features rap vocals performed over a house rhythm track.

Their initial success brought comparisons with pop record producers Stock Aitken Waterman, but the Beatmasters cited rival producers Coldcut as their major competitor.

== History ==
Manda Glanfield and Paul Carter (both regulars on the London club scene) were working in the TV commercial jingle industry where they were introduced to third member, Richard Walmsley. Signing to the burgeoning record label Rhythm King, they joined labelmates Bomb the Bass and S'Express in regularly appearing in the top 40 of the UK Singles Chart during 1988 and 1989.

The group had seven UK chart singles, including the No. 14 hit "Burn It Up", which featured P. P. Arnold and "Rok da House" with the Cookie Crew, which was their first and biggest hit, peaking at No. 5 in early 1988. Another notable single was "Hey DJ – I Can't Dance to that Music You're Playing" / "Ska Train", which introduced the rapper/singer Betty Boo to the general public and gave the group a No. 7 chart hit in 1989.

They released two albums under the Beatmasters moniker: Anywayawanna (1989) and Life & Soul (1992). These albums were later repackaged on BMG Records under the title Anywayawanna – The Best of the Beatmasters (2004).

Carter and Glanfield forged a successful writing, remixing and production career. Their first success as a duo came in 1991 with a reworking of the re-released Shamen single "Move Any Mountain/Progen91" which charted at No. 4. In 1992, production work commenced on the Shamen album Boss Drum, which included the singles "LSI (Love Sex Intelligence)", "Phorever People" and the highly controversial "Ebeneezer Goode" – the latter spending a month at No. 1 on the UK Singles Chart.

They went on to write, produce and remix for many other artists including Marc Almond, Pet Shop Boys, Blur, Roachford, Betty Boo, Naomi Campbell, Adam Rickitt, Moby, Aswad, Eternal, Tina Turner, David Bowie, Depeche Mode, Scooch and Girls Aloud. Still working, the Beatmasters continue to produce dance, pop and rock music.

== Members ==
- Manda Glanfield (born 27 January 1961) – songwriter/producer
- Paul Carter (born 27 May 1961) – songwriter/producer
- Richard Walmsley (born 28 September 1962) – songwriter/producer
- Pete Brazier (born 8 April 1971) – songwriter/producer (2022–present)

== Discography ==
=== Albums ===
List of albums, with selected chart positions
Title	Album details	Peak chart positions	
Title	Album details	UK	AUS
Anywayawanna	Released: 1989; Label: Rhythm King; Formats: LP, CS, CD	30	129
Life and Soul	Released: 1991; Label: Rhythm King; Formats: LP, CS, CD	—	162
Anywayawanna – The Best of the Beatmasters	Released: 2004; Label: BMG; Format: CD	—	—

=== Singles ===
Year	Single	Peak positions								Album
Year	Single	UK	IRE	NED	BEL (FLA)	FRA	GER	AUS	NZ	Album
1987	"Rok da House" (featuring Cookie Crew)	5	17	15	32	35	—	37	7	Anywayawanna
1988	"Burn It Up" (featuring P. P. Arnold)	14	15	54	—	—	—	165	24	Anywayawanna
1989	"Who's in the House" (featuring MC Merlin)	8	15	45	40	—	—	137	—	Anywayawanna
1989	"Hey DJ/I Can't Dance (To That Music You're Playing)" (featuring Betty Boo) / "Ska Train"	7	17	14	35	—	93	88	10	Anywayawanna
1989	"Warm Love" (featuring Claudia Fontaine)	51	24	79	—	—	—	117	—	Anywayawanna
1991	"Dunno What It Is About You" (featuring Elaine Vassell)	43	—	—	—	—	—	162	—	Life & Soul
1991	"Boulevard of Broken Dreams" (featuring JC-001)	62	—	—	—	—	—	93	—	Life & Soul
"—" denotes releases that did not chart or were not released.

=== Selected productions ===
- "Females" – Cookie Crew (1987)
- "Born Free" – MC Merlin (1987)
- "Stay Away" – Hotline (1988)
- "Stand Up for Your Love Rights" – Yazz (1989)
- "Doin the Do" – Betty Boo (1990)
- "Could This Be Love?" – Kerry Shaw (1993)
- "Shine" – Aswad (1994)
- "Warriors" – Aswad (1994)
- "Danger in Your Eyes" – Aswad (1995)
- "Bubblin Hot" – Pato Banton (1995)
- "Space" – Bond (2002)
- "Kashmir" – Bond (2002)
- "Allegretto" – Bond (2002)
- "Gypsy Rhapsody" – Bond (2002)
- "Boogie Down Love" – Girls Aloud (2003)
- "Love Bomb" – Girls Aloud (2003)
- "Marrs Attack" – Girls Aloud (2003)
- "Grease" – Girls Aloud (2003)
- "Wigwam" – Wigwam (Alex James/Betty Boo) (2006)
- "Blink" – Helicopter Girl (2008)
- "Metropolitan" – Helicopter Girl (2008)
- "Hey DJ 2009" – The Beatmasters (2009)

=== Selected remixes ===
- "Behind the Wheel" – Depeche Mode (1987)
- "Route 66" – Depeche Mode (1987)
- "These Things Happen" – Viola Wills (1988)
- "Move Any Mountain/Progen" – The Shamen (1991)
- "L.S.I." – The Shamen (1992)
- "Phorever People" – The Shamen (1992)
- "Ebeneezer Goode" – The Shamen (1992)
- "Boss Drum" – The Shamen (1992)
- "Comin On Strong" – The Shamen (1992)
- "Lucy Can't Dance" – David Bowie (1992)
- "Destination Eschaton" – The Shamen (1995)
- "Transamazonia" – The Shamen (1995)
- "MK2A" – The Shamen (1995)
- "Fall from Grace" – Eskimos and Egypt (1993)
- "Disco Inferno" – Tina Turner (1993)
- "Everytime You Touch Me" – Moby (1993)
- "I Wouldn't Normally Do This Kind of Thing" – Pet Shop Boys (1993)
- "Adored and Explored" – Marc Almond (1994)
- "Jungle Warrior" – Aswad (1994)
- "I Love Saturday" – Erasure (1994)
- "Run to the Sun" – Erasure (1994)
- "Into the Blue" – Moby (1995)
- "Shine" – Aswad (1995)
- "Boys and Girls" – Blur (1995)
- "Down" – Roachford (1995)
- "Still Be Lovin' You" – Damage (2000)
- "So What If I" – Damage (2000)
- "Sugar Baby" – Elizabeth Troy (2000)
- "Minus 10 Degrees" – Elizabeth Troy (2000)
- "I Got U" – Elizabeth Troy (2000)
- "Lover" – LMC (2005)
