= Jerry Sadowitz =

American-born Scottish comedian (born 1961)

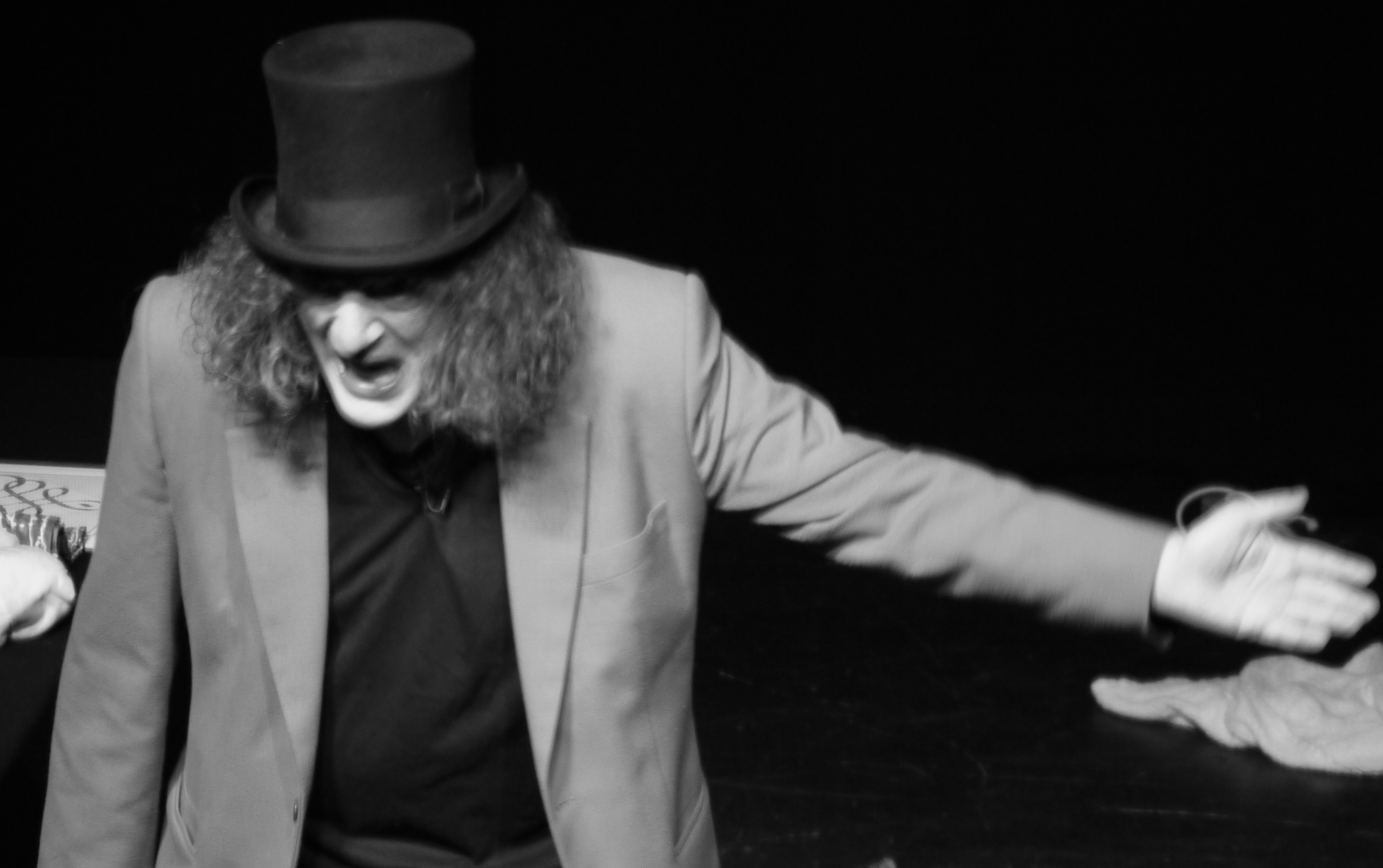
- Sadowitz in March 2011
- Born: June 1961 (age 65); New Jersey, U.S.
- Occupations: Stand-up comedian, magician
- Website: jerrysadowitz.com

Jerry Sadowitz (born June 1961) is an American-born Scottish stand-up comedian and magician.

Notorious for his controversial brand of black comedy, Sadowitz has said that audiences going to see a comedian should suspend their beliefs. He has influenced a generation of comedians, but states that "politically incorrect comedy: it's me, and it's been ripped off by loads and loads of comics". In 2007, he was voted the 15th-greatest stand-up comic on Channel 4's 100 Greatest Stand-Ups. In the 2010 list, he was voted the 33rd-greatest stand-up comic.

Sadowitz has also been described by some critics as a highly skilled close-up magician and practitioner of sleight of hand. He has written several books on magic and developed several conjuring innovations.

== Early life ==
Sadowitz was born in June 1961 in New Jersey, the son of a Scottish-Jewish mother named Roslyn and a Jewish-American father who worked as a scrap metal merchant. His parents split up when he was three, and he moved with his mother back to her native Glasgow when he was seven. Sadowitz attended Calderwood Lodge Primary and then Shawlands Academy. He took an interest in magic at the age of nine, and by the age of 11 decided that he wanted to become a magician, acquiring books from Tam Shepherd's Magic and Joke Shop. Sadowitz was encouraged by his mother to research magic at his local library, and he was once kicked out of a school exam after the examiner discovered his deck of cards and thought he was cheating. He has suffered from ulcerative colitis since childhood.

== Career ==
=== 1980s ===
Sadowitz made his comedy debut in 1983 at a Glasgow club and secured a regular stand-up slot at the Weavers Inn pub on London Road in Glasgow. The pub was run by future comedian Janey Godley, and Sadowitz got the gig after her brother Jim begged her to put him on. Sadowitz began travelling to London to perform at The Comedy Store every two weeks for two years, making the 400-mile journey via Stagecoach express coach. He moved to the city permanently in 1986, living with his mother in Hampstead until 2005. There, he began his first job working in Selfridges.

In the early days, Sadowitz was managed by comedian and club proprietor Malcolm Hardee. As a bet with fellow comic Nick Revell, he produced one of his most famous lines of that era: "Nelson Mandela, what a cunt. Terry Waite, fucking bastard. I dunno, you lend some people a fiver, you never see them again." For a time Sadowitz was considered part of the alternative comedy movement, but his act proved too objectionable with The Guardian stating that Sadowitz "shook up the right-on values of the 80s alternative comedy circuit with his willingness to say the unsayable". Sadowitz has described Bernard Manning as "the good cop" to his bad.

Sadowitz's 1987 Edinburgh Fringe show Total Abuse was filmed at the Assembly Rooms and also released in audio as the album Gobshite. The album was quickly withdrawn from sale due to fears of being sued for libel by Jimmy Savile as Sadowitz references rumours of the TV personality being a paedophile. Following Savile's death in 2011, hundreds of reports of sexual abuse by him became public.

After a brief run as a columnist for Time Out magazine, he embarked on the Lose Your Comic Virginity tour in 1989. At this time he was being managed by Jon Thoday's fledgling Avalon Entertainment Ltd. The tour culminated in a show at the Dominion Theatre in London, at the end of which he appeared from the rear of the auditorium wearing a kilt and a huge plastic phallus from which he sprayed the audience.

=== 1990s ===
In 1991, Sadowitz was knocked unconscious by an audience member during a performance at the Just for Laughs Comedy Festival in Montreal, where he mocked French Canadians, starting with the greeting "Hello moosefuckers! I tell you why I hate Canada, half of you speak French, and the other half let them." The rarely quoted follow-up line, which Sadowitz claims is what actually led to him being attacked, was "Why don't you speak Indian? You might as well speak the language of the people you stole the country off of in the first place."

In 1992, Sadowitz appeared in his own television show The Pall Bearer's Revue. In the same year, he appeared in the music video of The Shamen's UK number 1 hit "Ebeneezer Goode". Sadowitz later expressed regret over his appearance in the video, stating that "it shows how stupid I am. I didn't even know that song was about drugs. I don't take drugs and had I known I wouldn't have done it". He also befriended Derren Brown, who he met while working the International Magic shop in Clerkenwell, London. He helped Brown in his early career by putting him in touch with H&R publishers and Objective Productions, a production company founded by the television magician Andrew O'Connor. which led to his breakthrough show Mind Control in 2000.

Between 1994 and 1998, Sadowitz performed as part of the double act Bib & Bob with Logan Murray. His work with Murray took the form of sketches aimed at alienating almost everyone, with the duo stamping on a blow-up doll of the recently deceased Linda McCartney, and tipping Murray, dressed as Superman, out of a wheelchair into the audience (a reference to the paralysis of Christopher Reeve). At one show, Sadowitz spat in the face of a drunken heckler who was constantly interrupting the show. His final act was to strip naked and run across the stage, prompting a mixture of disgust and hilarity from the audience. The Herald described the show as featuring "Pyrotechnical swearing. Lavatorial straining noises. Wanton foodstuff-smearing. Simulated sodomy. Gratuitous adoption of Indian accents, plus spitting, shouting, and penile dismemberment".

In 1998, Sadowitz joined the newly launched Channel 5 network, hosting his own panel show, The People vs. Jerry Sadowitz. The show featured Sadowitz sitting at a desk inviting members of the audience to join him and talk about a topic close to their heart and trying to get Sadowitz to agree with them. If they succeeded in winning Sadowitz over, they were invited back at the end of the show for a chance to compete for a £10,000 cash prize. If Sadowitz was not convinced or became bored during the audience member's time, he would ring a bell on the desk signalling for the show's resident bouncer Dave Courtney to escort them from the stage. Contestants on the show were regularly verbally abused by Sadowitz, and over the course of the series no one managed to win the cash prize. The show led to the channel being reprimanded by the Broadcasting Standards Commission, after they concluded that the repeated use of the words "fuck" and "cunt" "had a cumulative effect that was both excessive and unnecessary". In the same year, a full-frontal nude shot of Sadowitz appeared in Esquire magazine as part of a 14-page "uncensored sex special". Despite the reprimand, Sadowitz continued to work with Channel 5, co-presenting The Jerry Atrick Show between 2000 and 2002.

=== 2000–present ===
In 2005, Sadowitz performed two separate shows at that year's Edinburgh Fringe: a stand-up comedy show (Not For The Easily Offended) at The Queens Hall, and Jerry Sadowitz – Card Tricks & Close Up Magic at The Assembly Rooms. The comedy show included a character named "Rabbi Burns", a cross between a Jew and the famous Scottish poet. He performed a similar series of shows at the Soho Theatre in London between December 2006 and January 2007.

In 2006 he toured his "Equal Opportunities Offender" show and broke the Soho box office record for ticket sales when he performed his close up magic show at the Soho Theatre. In 2007, he performed his Edinburgh Festival show "Comedian, Magician, Psychopath" to a sold-out crowd at the Udderbelly.

In March 2008, as part of the Glasgow Comedy Festival, Sadowitz sold out the Theatre Royal. He performed the show "Comedian, Magician, Psychopath 2: Because I Still Have to Pay the Rent" at the Edinburgh Comedy Festival in 2008. In this show he celebrated the 2008 Sichuan earthquake, making stereotypical references to Chinese people. In December 2008, Sadowitz sold out the Queen Elizabeth Hall on the Southbank, London.

In 2008, Sadowitz published an open letter to reviewers asking them not to quote his material stating that "a very important element of comedy is surprise, and it can often make the difference between a show that works and one that does not". He also protects his intellectual property, removing clips of himself from YouTube and torrent sites within hours of their appearance.

Since 2010, Sadowitz has performed several runs at the Leicester Square Theatre in London. In April 2011, Sadowitz recorded two of these performances with the intention of releasing a DVD. The release was shelved after he changed his mind about releasing anything, stating that "I don't want people looking at me on a DVD for the first time – and there are loads of people who haven't seen me – and thinking: "Oh, he's a bit like Frankie Boyle. Oh, he's a bit like Ricky Gervais, he's a bit like Jimmy Carr or Chubby Brown. I've heard Doug Stanhope do that..." So I don't want people saying that about me."

Sadowitz appeared in the 2012 Kathy Burke comedy-drama Walking and Talking on Sky Atlantic, playing the character Jimmy the Jew.

A stand up tour, "Comedian, Magician, Bawbag!", in February 2013 and close up magic and comedy "Comedian, Magician, Psychopath!" in early 2014, when Sadowitz was promoted by an unknown friend, seemed to put Sadowitz back on the circuit with several sold-out shows including Manchester, Leeds, Brighton, Glasgow and Inverness. Throughout this tour, Sadowitz played a video appeal at the beginning performances regarding the death of his friend Mark Blanco, who died in December 2006 after falling from the first-floor balcony of a flat in Whitechapel belonging to singer Pete Doherty's friend and literary agent Paul Roundhill. The video included an appeal from Blanco's mother for the Crown Prosecution Service to reopen the case.

In 2016, Sadowitz launched the "Trick of the Month Club" in which he teaches a new card trick every month to paying subscribers. In late 2016 Sadowitz tour "Comedian, Magician, Psychopath!" visited London, Glasgow, Manchester and Wolverhampton.

In 2019, Sadowitz toured the UK with his show "Make Comedy Grate Again" (a reference to Donald Trump's campaign slogan "Make America Great Again"). A gig in Liverpool during this run of shows was covered on comedy website Chortle after an audience member collapsed due to excessive laughter. Sadowitz also took his "Comedian, Magician, Psychopath 2019" show to the Edinburgh Fringe Festival.

Sadowitz's 2022 Edinburgh Fringe show was cancelled after one night because staff members—and, reportedly, audience members–at the Pleasance theatre found the material offensive. The venue later clarified that this was due to "racism, sexism, homophobia and misogyny", that "the material presented at his first show is not acceptable and does not align with our values", and that he had exposed his penis to a member of the audience. Sadowitz defended himself against those who made the decision, accusing them of "cheapening and simplifying" his act. In the aftermath of Sadowitz's show at the Fringe being cancelled, his tour of the UK saw increased ticket sales and a date being added at London's Hammersmith Apollo.

In 2025, along with fellow magician Caspar Thomas, Sadowitz began performing a weekly magic show at the Betsey Trotwood pub in London.

== Comedy style ==
Commenting on his "imitators", he said that "I'm sorry I've given some very nasty people a good living."

Outbursts of his savage comedy during his conjuring shows have sometimes alienated him from the more conservative magic community.

== Television credits ==
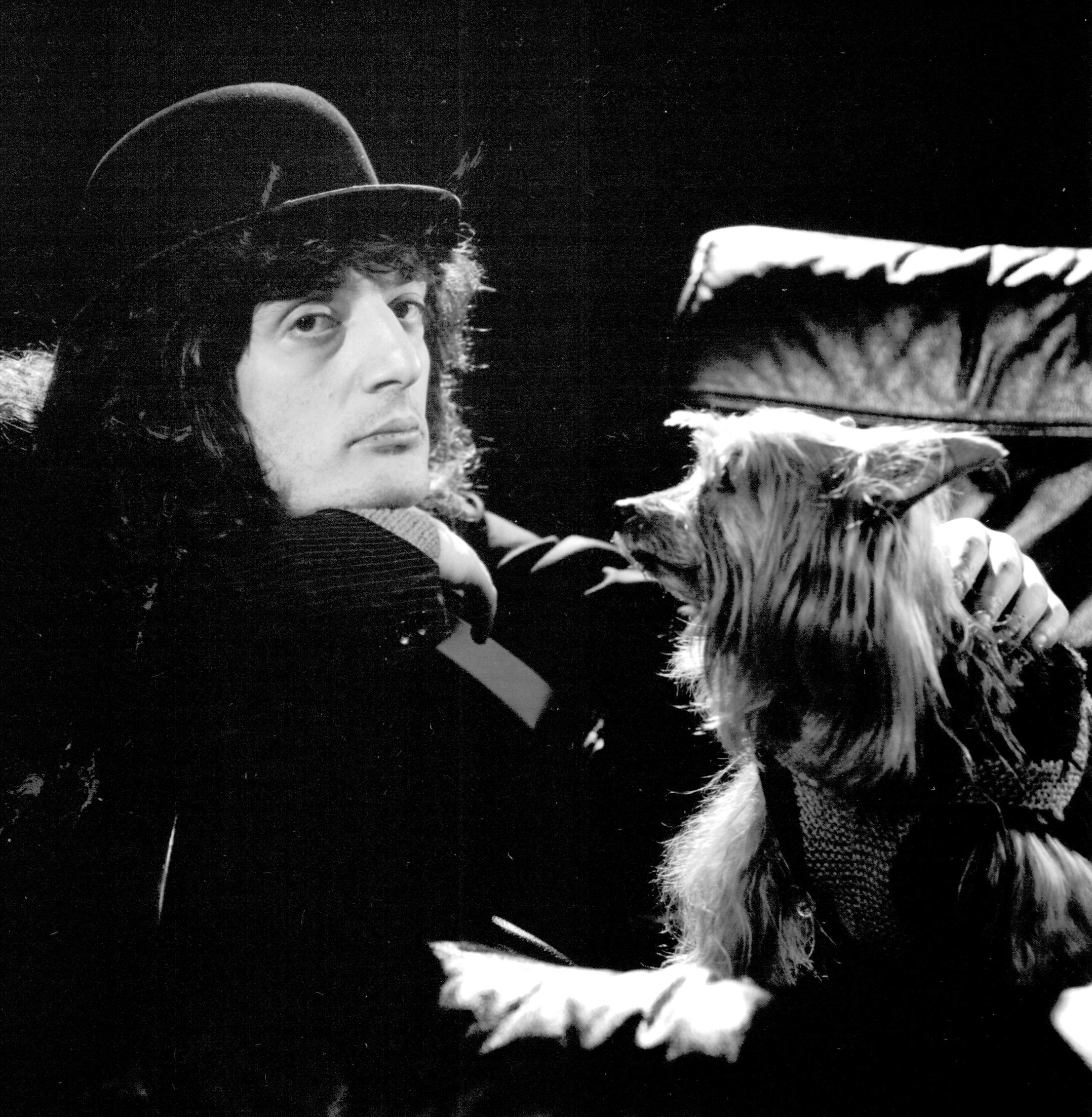
Appearing on The Greatest F***ing Show on Earth

- Rab C. Nesbitt, BBC, 1988
- The Last Laugh with Jerry Sadowitz, British Satellite Broadcasting, 1990
- The Other Side of Gerry Sadowitz, Channel 4, 1990
- The Pall Bearer's Revue, BBC Two, 1992
- Without Walls: The Greatest F***ing Show on Earth, Open Media for Channel 4, 1994 (The Times wrote "probably contains the greatest number of swear words ever uttered on TV")
- Stuff the White Rabbit, BBC Two, 1997
- The People vs. Jerry Sadowitz, Channel 5, 1998–1999
- TFI Friday, Channel 4, 1998
- The 11 O'Clock Show, Channel 4, 2000
- The Panel, Network Ten, 2000
- The Jerry Atrick Show, 2000
- The People of New York vs Jerry Sadowitz, Channel 5, 2001
- The Jerry Atrick Show, Channel 5, 2000–2002
- 100 Greatest Standups, Channel 4, 2007
- Stewart Lee's Comedy Vehicle, BBC Two, 2009 (one episode)
- Walking and Talking, Sky Atlantic, 2012 (four episodes)

== Filmography ==
- Malcolm Hardee: 25 Years in Showbiz, 1990
- 1 Giant Leap, 2002

== Bibliography ==
- Alternative Card Magic: Jerry Sadowitz & Peter Duffie (1982)
- Contemporary Card Magic: Jerry Sadowitz & Peter Duffie (1984)
- Cards Hit (1984)
- Inspirations: Jerry Sadowitz & Peter Duffie (1987)
- Cards on the Table (1988)
- Out of Sight (1993)
- The Marenzal Reverse (1993)
- Thanks to Zarrow (1997)
- Cut Controls (2004)
- Dr Norman Nutjobs 50 Close-Up Problems (2005)
- The Crimp magazine (1992 – present)
- Card Tricks for Beginners (1994) (Illustrations) ISBN 978-0-947533-33-5
