= The People vs. Jerry Sadowitz =

British television series

The People vs. Jerry Sadowitz is a late night British TV show which ran from 1998 to 1999 on Channel Five. It featured comedian Jerry Sadowitz talking to members of the public. The idea being that the person Sadowitz found most deserving would win the prize of £10,000. Contestants could talk about any subject they liked except "No politics, no religion!". The show featured a lot of strong language.

The programme later went on to become known as The Beast of Jerry Sadowitz.

People would have to explain their case until Sadowitz pushed a bell as a sign that they should stop and leave. Contestants refusing to do so were escorted off by Jerry's minder, played for one series by Dave Courtney. The minder had a non-speaking part in the show, and when a female contestant's statement "It leaves a bad taste in my mouth" prompted Courtney to ad-lib, "That's spunk", he received a furious dressing down from Sadowitz. Contestants were seldom allowed to talk for long before being interrupted and verbally abused. The prize money was never given out.

People wishing to appear on the show would have to accept that the recording footage could be edited and used as the producers saw fit, and agree to waive any moral rights.
