= In Gorbachev We Trust =

Studio album by The Shamen
- Released: 30 January 1989
- Recorded: 1988–1989
- Genre: Dance-rock
- Length: 45:37
- Label: Moksha Records; Demon Music Group

The Shamen chronology
Drop (1987)	In Gorbachev We Trust (1989)	Phorward (1989)

Professional ratings
Review scores
Source	Rating
AllMusic	2/5 stars
Encyclopedia of Popular Music	3/5 stars
The Great Rock Discography	7/10
Melody Maker	favourable
NME	9/10
Record Mirror	4/5

In Gorbachev We Trust is the second album by the Scottish band The Shamen, released in 1989. It is an important landmark in The Shamen's transition from the psychedelic rock of Drop to the electronic dance music that would bring them chart success. The "Gorbachev" of the album's title is Mikhail Gorbachev, the leader of the Soviet Union from 1985 to 1991.

== Track listing ==
1. Synergy
2. Sweet Young Thing
3. Raspberry Infundibulum
4. War Prayer
5. Adam Strange
6. Jesus Loves Amerika (Fundamental)
7. Transcendental
8. Misinformation
9. Raptyouare
10. In Gorbachev We Trust
11. Yellow Cellophane Day
12. Mayhew Speaks Out

== 1999 reissue ==
In Gorbachev We Trust was reissued in 1999 on the Sequel label, with three extra tracks: "Long Gone", "Fire Engine", and "Knature Of A Girl".

== See also ==
- The Shamen discography
