= Fade to Black (Cookie Crew album) =

Studio album by Cookie Crew
- Released: 1991
- Genre: Hip-hop
- Labels: London, FFRR

Cookie Crew chronology
Born This Way (1989)	Fade to Black (1991)

Fade to Black is the second and final studio album by the British hip hop duo Cookie Crew. It was released in 1991 by London Records and FFRR Records.

== Critical reception ==
Professional ratings
Review scores
Source	Rating
AllMusic	2/5 stars
Leicester Mercury	4/4 stars
South Wales Echo	5/5 stars

In a review, the Rhyl, Prestatyn and Abergele Journal stated that "the Cookie Crew have found a new maturity both musically and lyrically" that has "increased crossover potential". The South Wales Echo called it "one of the smartest rap LPS for a while", noting that "the message and the music are powerful" and praising the sampling work of the singles".

Billboard praised the "potent grooves" and lyrics of the album, stating that the duo "drop intelligent rhymes that tackle topical issues like world peace, poverty, street crime, and education." Nick James, writing for God Is in the TV, called it "societal", stating that the track 'Love Will Bring Us Together' had "a heavier tone." He also noted that the title track "tackles [sic] the subject of race and the misinformation those of colour had found themselves following".
