= Cookie Crew =

1983–1992 British rap duo

- MC Remedee and Susie Q

Background information
- Origin: London, England
- Genres: Hip-hop; hip house
- Years active: 1983–1992
- Labels: Rhythm King; FFRR
- Past members: Susan Banfield; Debbie Pryce

Cookie Crew were an English rap music duo formed in Clapham, South London in 1983.

== Career ==
Debbie Pryce (MC Remedee) and Susan Banfield (Susie Q) were originally part of a rap group called "Warm Milk And The Cookie Crew", but left, shortening their name to just "Cookie Crew". Their career took off after winning a national rap championship and recording two sessions for the John Peel BBC Radio 1 show. They gained a recording contract from the UK dance record label Rhythm King and were put in the studio with the production trio Beatmasters, who put them in a house music direction.

In July 1987, the resultant single "Rok da House" was popular in the nightclubs. Their follow-up single "Females" also was a minor hit in October 1987. The continuing popularity of "Rok da House" in nightclubs eventually renewed interest in the track and garnered television appearances on the No Limits programme. The record was remixed at the end of December 1987 and crossed over into the mainstream. The song became a top 5 hit in the UK Singles Chart at the beginning of February 1988, and was used for an advertising campaign. The "embryonic hip-house track" was "one of the earliest examples of hip house".

The duo moved on to another record label, FFRR and different producers, resulting in a string of hit singles in 1989, with "Born This Way (Let's Dance)", "Got to Keep On" with Edwin Starr and "Come and Get Some"; plus the album Born This Way! which reached number 24 in the UK Albums Chart. "Got to Keep On" also reached No. 33 in the U.S. Dance chart.

By 1992, there were differences of opinion between the duo and label, who wanted to pursue more of an orthodox hip hop/rap style, and FFRR's owner London Records, who wanted to steer the duo towards more of a pop oriented style of rap. This resulted in the duo parting company with FFRR and retiring from the hip hop/rap scene. Despite this, Pryce and Banfield have remained involved with other projects within the music industry.

Banfield is the sister of The Pasadenas' singer Andrew Banfield, and Pryce was formerly a chef for the Ministry of Defence.

== Group members ==
- MC Remedee (born Debbie Pryce, 16 August 1967)
- Susie Q (born Susan Amanda Banfield, 10 March 1967)

== Discography ==
=== Albums ===
- Born This Way – 1989 – UK No. 24; U.S. R&B No. 93
- Fade to Black – 1991

=== Singles ===
Title	Year	Peak chart positions									Album
Title	Year	UK	IRE	NED	BEL (FLA)	FRA	AUS	NZ	US Dance	US R&B	Album
"Rok da House" (as Beatmasters featuring Cookie Crew)	1987	79	—	—	—	—	—	—	—	—	Anywayawanna
"Females"	1987	78	—	18	20	—	—	—	16	75	Non-album single
"Rok da House (W.E.F.U.N.K.)" (as Beatmasters featuring Cookie Crew)	1988	5	17	15	32	35	37	7	—	—	Anywayawanna
"Born This Way (Let's Dance)"	1989	23	28	45	—	—	—	28	—	—	Born This Way!
"Got to Keep On"	1989	17	29	—	—	—	—	—	33	—	Born This Way!
"Come On and Get Some"	1989	42	—	—	—	—	—	—	—	—	Born This Way!
"Secrets (Of Success)"	1991	53	—	—	—	—	—	—	—	—	Fade to Black
"Love Will Bring Us Back Together"	1991	—	—	—	—	—	—	—	—	—	Fade to Black
"Brother Like Sister"	1992	—	—	46	—	—	—	—	—	—	Fade to Black
"—" denotes releases that did not chart or were not released.
