= The Pall Bearer's Revue =

- Directed by: John Kilby; Stephen Stewart
- Starring: Geoffrey McGivern; Mark E. Smith; Dreenagh Darrell; Jerry Sadowitz
- Country of origin: United Kingdom
- No. of series: 1
- No. of episodes: 5

Production
- Running time: 30 minutes

Original release
- Network: BBC
- Release: 6 January – 3 February 1992

The Pall Bearer's Revue is a 1992 sketch and stand-up comedy show written by Jerry Sadowitz and starring Sadowitz and Dreenagh Darrell. The show also featured appearances from Geoffrey McGivern, Ben Miller and Mark E. Smith. The series' title comes from an old magic magazine "The Pallbearer's Review".

Each episode featured a mixture of sketches, comedy monologues from Sadowitz, as well as magic tricks including a special section dubbed "The Roy Walton Moment" in which Sadowitz would perform a magic trick invented by his mentor, famed magician Roy Walton. Although not as abundant with profanity or scatological humour as Sadowitz' live stand up, the show nevertheless made heavy use of tasteless and aggressive blue comedy and has been described as one of the most controversial comedy series ever broadcast in the United Kingdom. The final episode ended with the studio being invaded by the armies of all the countries Sadowitz had offended over the course of the series, who then gunned down Sadowitz and Darrell.

As a result of the record number of viewer complaints sent to the BBC, The Pall Bearer's Revue was rescheduled to a late night slot, had negative continuity announcements air before the show, and has never been repeated or released on home video or DVD. The series is also frequently cited as the catalyst for the BBC blackballing Sadowitz from the organisation entirely and for his long-standing reputation of being "difficult to work with". However, in a 2013 interview with the British Comedy Guide, Sadowitz dismissed these claims, stating that Alan Yentob hated the show and saw it as a threat to his job, so Yentob did everything he could to conceal it and make sure as few people as possible saw it.
