= List of UK Independent Singles Chart number ones of 1990 =

These are the UK Official Indie Chart number-one hits of the 1990 as compiled by MRIB and Music Week from August 11.

Issue date	Song	Artist	Record label	ref
6 January	"Getting Away with It"	Electronic	Factory	
13 January	"Madchester Rave On" E.P.	Happy Mondays	Factory	
20 January	"Madchester Rave On" E.P.	Happy Mondays	Factory	
27 January	"Madchester Rave On" E.P.	Happy Mondays	Factory	
3 February	"Ride" E.P.	Ride	Creation	
10 February	"Sleep With Me"	Birdland	Lazy	
17 February	"Indian Rope"	The Charlatans	Situation Two	
24 February	"Enjoy the Silence"	Depeche Mode	Mute	
3 March	"Enjoy the Silence"	Depeche Mode	Mute	
10 March	"Elephant Stone"	The Stone Roses	Silvertone	
17 March	"Blue Savannah"	Erasure	Mute	
24 March	"Blue Savannah"	Erasure	Mute	
8 April	"This Is How It Feels"	Inspiral Carpets	Cow	
15 April	"Step On"	Happy Mondays	Factory	
22 April	"Step On"	Happy Mondays	Factory	
29 April	"Step On"	Happy Mondays	Factory	
5 May	"Step On"	Happy Mondays	Factory	
12 May	"Step On"	Happy Mondays	Factory	
19 May	"Glider EP"	My Bloody Valentine	Creation	
26 May	"Better the Devil You Know"	Kylie Minogue	PWL	
2 June	"Better the Devil You Know"	Kylie Minogue	PWL	
9 June	"The Only One I Know"	The Charlatans	Situation Two	
16 June	"The Only One I Know"	The Charlatans	Situation Two	
23 June	"World in Motion"	EnglandNew Order	Factory	
30 June	"She Comes in the Fall"	Inspiral Carpets	Cow	
7 July	"She Comes in the Fall"	Inspiral Carpets	Cow	
14 July	"One Love"	The Stone Roses	Silvertone	
21 July	"One Love"	The Stone Roses	Silvertone	
28 July	"One Love"	The Stone Roses	Silvertone	
4 August	"Velouria"	Pixies	4AD	
11 August	"Naked in the Rain"	Blue Pearl	Big Life	
18 August	"Naked in the Rain"	Blue Pearl	Big Life	
25 August	"Naked in the Rain"	Blue Pearl	Big Life	
1 September	"Naked in the Rain"	Blue Pearl	Big Life	
8 September	"What Time Is Love?"	The KLF	KLF Communications	
15 September	"What Time Is Love?"	The KLF	KLF Communications	
22 September	"What Time Is Love?"	The KLF	KLF Communications	
29 September	"What Time Is Love?"	The KLF	KLF Communications	
6 October	"Groovy Train"	The Farm	Produce	
13 October	"I Can't Stand It!"	Twenty 4 Seven	Freaky	
20 October	"I Can't Stand It!"	Twenty 4 Seven	Freaky	
27 October	"I Can't Stand It!"	Twenty 4 Seven	Freaky	
3 November	"Kinky Afro"	Happy Mondays	Factory	
10 November	"Kinky Afro"	Happy Mondays	Factory	
17 November	"Step Back in Time"	Kylie Minogue	PWL	
24 November	"Step Back in Time"	Kylie Minogue	PWL	
1 December	Island Head EP	Inspiral Carpets	Cow/Mute	
8 December	"Sucker DJ"	Dimples D.	FBI	
15 December	"All Together Now"	The Farm	Produce	
22 December	"All Together Now"	The Farm	Produce	
29 December	"All Together Now"	The Farm	Produce	
