= Jesus Loves Amerika =

Single by The Shamen

from the album In Gorbachev We Trust
- Released: 1988
- Genre: Industrial, alternative rock, electronic, rock
- Length: 4:44
- Label: Ediesta Records
- Songwriter: The Shamen

The Shamen singles chronology
"Transcendental" (1988)	"Jesus Loves Amerika" (1988)	"What's Going Down?" (1989)

Music video
- "Jesus Loves Amerika" on YouTube

"Jesus Loves Amerika" is a single by The Shamen released in 1988 with music sampling containing well-known lyrical statements denouncing Christian fundamentalists ("yeah, these are the men who put the right in righteous, such hypocrisy, stupidity is truly out of sight, yes"). A music video was later released for the single. Will Sin later explained in an interview with Snub TV in 1989 concerning the song:

"When you start to make statements about things, [such as] people like the tabloid media in this country, and they'll always pick up on it, and they'll always give it some kind of sensationalist slant, so when we became aware of fundamentalism in America, and that Jesus loves America, what they said was, well, [if] these people are attacking Christianity, then they must be Satanists. As an Atheist, those two things just don't go together. Both ideas are equally are just as ludicrous that they will try to pen something on you if they don't like the ideas that you're promoting."

== Track listing ==
- A - "Jesus Loves Amerika" (4:44)
- B1 - "Darkness In Zion" (1:53)
- B2 - "Do What You Will" (2:55)
