= Knature of a Girl =

"Knature Of A Girl"

Single by The Shamen
- Released: 1987
- Genre: Psychedelic rock, alternative rock
- Label: Moksha
- Songwriter(s): The Shamen

The Shamen singles chronology
"Something About You" (1986)	"Knature Of A Girl" (1987)	"Christopher Mayhew Says" (1987)

Music video
- "Knature of a Girl" on YouTube

"Knature Of A Girl" is a single by The Shamen released in 1987. The subject of the song concerns how female sexuality can be distorted and abused in the name of the feminine ideal. The backing film for the song included in-explicit footage of a young woman stripping, for which band members Will Sinnott and Colin Angus were later confronted. Fed up with the complaints, they later replaced the backing film with much more pornographic materials, with much more of an effort to prove the point. Will Sin later explained in an interview:

"...even when we used that part of the visuals properly, we were still getting lots of girls coming up to us afterwards, asking us why we used it. The point just wasn’t getting through. We decided we’d had enough of people complaining about it. We had a set of black and white line drawings by a guy called Eric Stanton, who draws woman in long black leather boots in all these incredible bondage scenes, chained and strapped up, all sorts of things. We thought, let’s give it a go and see what people make of this. Now I wouldn’t consider the original film to be real porn, it was pretty soft, arty 1930s stuff. The Stanton drawings, they were porn. They were fucking hardcore porn. And not a word was said. Nobody passed a single comment about them.”

Colin Angus also mentioned:

"If you’d have seen these things …I’m sure they were drawn as a labour of love, but they’re the product of a totally perverted mind. But nobody said a thing about them, because they weren’t a film and they weren’t glossy photographs. In the end, we threw all that lot out because basically British audiences were too thick to understand what we were trying to do."

== Track listing ==
- A1 - "Knature Of A Girl"
- A2 - "What's Going Down"
- B1 - "Happy Days"
- B2 - "Sub Nature Of A Girl"
