= Merlin (rapper) =

British rapper

Justin Mark Boreland, better known as Merlin, is a British rapper of Jamaican descent from Brixton, London and nephew of reggae singer Smiley Culture. He was the featured vocalist on the B-side "Megablast" of the UK top-ten single "Don't Make Me Wait" by Bomb the Bass (1988) and A-side of the UK top-ten single "Who's in the House (The Hip House Anthem)" by the Beatmasters (1989). Merlin also contributed vocals to the track "Pimps, Pushers, Prostitutes" (for which he received a writing credit) on the 1989 UK top-five album Original Soundtrack by S'Express. An eponymous studio album was released the same year followed by a second, The New Rap Messiah, in 1992.

In 2020, Boreland became a tutor in music composition and production at the Institute of Contemporary Music Performance, London.

== Publications ==
- Boreland, Justin & Peters, Eleanor (2023). "The Benefits of Music Engagement Projects on Young People: A Music and Education Perspective". In Peters, Eleanor (ed.). Music in Crime, Resistance, and Identity. Routledge Studies in Crime, Media and Popular Culture. Abingdon: Routledge. ISBN 9781032030470.
