= UK Independent Singles and Albums Charts =

British record chart

The UK Independent Singles Chart and UK Independent Albums Chart are charts of the best-selling independent singles and albums, respectively, in the United Kingdom. Originally published in January 1980, and widely known as the indie chart, the relevance of the chart dwindled in the 1990s as major-label ownership blurred the boundary between independent and major labels.

Separate independent charts are currently published weekly by the Official Charts Company.

== History ==
In the wake of punk, small record labels began to spring up, as an outlet for artists that were unwilling to sign contracts with major record companies, or were not considered commercially attractive to those companies. By 1978, labels like Cherry Red, Rough Trade, and Mute had started up, and a support structure soon followed, including independent pressing, distribution and promotion. These labels got bigger and bigger, and by 1980 they were having Top 10 hits in the UK Singles Chart. Chart success was limited, however, since the official Top 40 was based on sales at large chains and ignored significant sales at the scores of independent record shops that existed. Iain McNay, of Cherry Red, suggested to the weekly trade paper Record Business the idea of an independent record chart to address the problem, and the first independent chart appeared in 1980, published in Record Business, and later licensed to Sounds.

The definition of whether or not a single was 'indie' had depended on the distribution channel by which it was shipped—the record needed to be delivered by a distribution service that was independent of the four major record companies: EMI, Sony Music Entertainment, Warner Music Group and Universal Music Group. In 1981, compilation of the chart switched to research company MRIB. The chart served to give exposure to the independent labels and the artists on those labels. In 1985 the trade publication Music Week started compiling its own indie chart, and both Sounds and Melody Maker later switched from the MRIB chart and adopted the Music Week chart instead. Other weekly music papers also published their own charts, often compiled from single record shops. However, none of them were as widespread as the MRIB chart which was even being published in countries abroad. By 1990, the significance of the chart had been diluted by major record companies forming their own 'indie' labels, with independent distribution, in order to break new acts via exposure from the indie chart.

To be included in the indie chart, a record had to be distributed independently of the corporate framework of the major record companies; the genre of music was irrelevant. Large independent distributors emerged such as Pinnacle and Spartan, and there later emerged The Cartel, an association of regional distributors including Rough Trade, Backs, and Red Rhino.

The first weekly independent chart was published on 19 January 1980, with "Where's Captain Kirk" by Spizzenergi topping the singles chart, and Dirk Wears White Sox by Adam and the Ants topping the album chart.

== Official Charts Company ==
Although the independent chart has less relevance today, The Official UK Charts Company still compiles a chart, consisting of those singles from the main chart on independent labels.

The OCC's Independent Chart was significantly altered in June 2009. Its new system altered the qualification criteria to include only singles from labels that were at least fifty per cent owned by a record company that was not one of the main four record companies. This prevented major record companies from qualifying for the chart by outsourcing the shipping of their singles to smaller distribution services. These new changes were first unveiled at the 2008 annual general meeting of the British Phonographic Industry on 9 July, and the new chart went live on 29 June 2009. The first song to top the chart under the new system was "Bonkers" by Dizzee Rascal, which also made it to No. 1 in the main UK Singles Chart.

During the 2000s and 2010s, even though many indie rock/post-punk revival bands like Arctic Monkeys topped the OCC's chart (with Arctic Monkeys' single "Do I Wanna Know?" reaching No. 2 in the chart in June 2013 while also making it to No. 11 in the main chart), many more dance, rap and heritage acts (in this case due to new large independent BMG) ended up in the chart with number ones coming from people like DVBBS and Borgeous (who reached number one with "Tsunami" featuring Tinie Tempah) or Major Lazer.

== Network/Music Week charts ==
- List of UK Independent Singles Chart number ones of 1990
- List of UK Independent Singles Chart number ones of 1991
- List of UK Independent Singles Chart number ones of 1992
- List of UK Independent Singles Chart number ones of 1993
- List of UK Independent Singles Chart number ones of 1994
- List of UK Independent Singles Chart number ones of 1995
- List of UK Independent Singles Chart number ones of 1996
- List of UK Independent Singles Chart number ones of 1997

== See also ==
- List of UK Independent Singles Chart number ones of the 1980s
- List of UK Independent Albums Chart number ones of the 1980s
- Lists of UK Independent Albums Chart number ones (2005–present)
- Lists of UK Independent Singles Chart number ones
- List of artists by number of UK Independent Singles Chart number ones
- UK Albums Chart
- UK Independent Singles and Album Breakers Charts
- UK Singles Chart
- Official Charts Company
