= Born This Way (Cookie Crew album) =

Studio album by Cookie Crew
- Released: 1989
- Genre: Hip hop
- Labels: London, FFRR
- Producers: Daddy-O, D.B.C., Davy D, Derek B.

Cookie Crew chronology
Born This Way (1989)	Fade to Black (1991)

Born This Way is the 1989 debut album by British rap duo Cookie Crew. The album reached No. 24 on the UK Albums Chart. All three singles released from the album charted on the UK Singles Chart: "Born This Way (Let's Dance)" (No. 23), "Got to Keep On" (No. 17) and "Come On and Get Some" (No. 42).

== Critical reception ==
Professional ratings
Review scores
Source	Rating
AllMusic	2/5 stars
Robert Christgau	B+
Hi-Fi News & Record Review	A:2
New Musical Express	8/10
Smash Hits	4/10

Chris Murray, of RPM, wrote: "Although the name might sound lightweight, this female duo from the UK delivers some aggressive rhymes backed by some fat and funky beats. Thoughtful production avoids the sparseness that plagues the releases of so many lesser known rap artists. Occasional sampling, when used, Is employed primarily as ear candy, rather than being thrust into the spotlight to grab listeners by providing them with something easily recognizable." Robert Christgau called Born This Way "the first U.K. rap album worth bragging about."

== Track listing ==
1. "Yo! What's Up" (D. Pryce, S. Banfield, Dazzle) (1:47)
2. "From the South" (D. Price, S. Banfield, D. Reeves) (5:33)
3. "Come On and Get Some" (G. Bolton, M. Nemley) (4:28)
4. "Pick Up on This" (G. Bolton, M. Nemley) (3:47)
5. "Feelin' Proud" (D. Pryce, S. Banfield, G. Bolton, M. Nemley) (4:45)
6. "Bad Girls (Rock the Spot)" (D. Pryce, S. Banfield) (5:05)
7. "Got to Keep On" (D. Pryce, S. Banfield, G. Bolton, M. Nemley) (5:04)
8. "Born This Way" (D. Pryce, S. Banfield, G. Bolton, M. Nemley) (3:40)
9. "Black Is the Word" (D. Pryce, S. Banfield, Dazzle) (4:56)
10. "Places and Spaces for Your Mind" (G. Bolton) (4:51)
11. "Rhymes and Careers" (D. Pryce, S. Banfield) (4:07)
12. "Dazzle's Thème" (Dazzle) (3:09)
13. "Got to Keep On" (B Boy Mix) (D. Pryce, S. Banfield, G. Bolton, M. Nemley) (5:04)
14. "Places and Spaces" (G. Bolton) (4:51)
