= Rok da House =

1987 single by the Beatmasters

Single by Beatmasters featuring Cookie Crew

from the album Anywayawanna
- Released: 1987
- Recorded: 1986
- Genre: Hip house
- Length: 6:40
- Label: Rhythm King
- Songwriters: Amanda Glanfield; Paul Carter; Richard Walmsley; Debbie Pryce; Susie Banfield
- Producer: Beatmasters

Beatmasters singles chronology
"Rok da House" (1987)	"Burn It Up" (1988)

"Rok da House" is the debut single by British production trio the Beatmasters featuring hip hop duo the Cookie Crew. Released as a single in 1987, the song was a top 40 hit in at least seven countries. In the UK, its first release only managed a peak of No. 79. However, a remix six months later was much more successful; this remix peaked at No. 5 on the UK Singles Chart in early 1988. In 1989, a further remix known as "Rok da House (W.E.F.U.N.K.)" appeared on their debut studio album Anywayawanna.

"Rok da House" is known to be the very first hip house record, having been written and pressed to vinyl in August 1986.

== Music video ==
The music video accompanies the 7" remix of the track and features black and white footage of cartoon characters and footage of building demolitions, with occasional colour text of the lyrics appearing.

== Track listings ==
UK 12" single/French CD single

A1. "Rok da House (12" original)" – 6:40
B1. "Rok da House (Latin Beat remix)" – 7:30 (remixed by Ivan Ivan)
B2. "Rok da House (Junie's mix)" – 5:37 (remixed by Ivan Ivan)

UK 7" 1987 single

A1. "Rok da House (7" original)" – 3:50
B1. "Rok da House (The Music)" – 5:30

UK 7" 1988 single

A1. "Rok da House (7" remix)" – 3:20 (remixed by Mark Saunders & Beatmasters)
B1. "Rok da House (7" original)" – 3:50

UK 12" 1988 single

A1. "Rok da House (12" remix)" – 6:40 (remixed by Mark Saunders & Beatmasters)
B1. "Rok da House (It's a Demo)"
B2. "Rok da House (The Music)" – 5.30

UK 12" 1988 single

A1. "Rok da House (Demolition mix)" (remixed by Mark Saunders)
B1. "Rok da House (Al' Nite Al' Rite instrumental)" (remixed by Mark Saunders)

== Charts ==
Chart (1987–88)	Peak position
UK Singles Chart	5
Irish Singles Chart	17
Netherlands (MegaCharts)	15
Belgium (Ultratop)	32
France (SNEP)	35
Australia (ARIA Charts)	37
New Zealand Music Chart	7
