= Drop (The Shamen album) =

Studio album by the Shamen
- Released: 29 June 1987
- Recorded: 1986–1987
- Genres: Psychedelic rock, alternative rock
- Length: 49:04
- Label: Moksha Records
- Producers: Mike Hedges, the Shamen, Wilf Smarties

The Shamen chronology
Drop (1987)	In Gorbachev We Trust (1989)

Professional ratings
Review scores
Source	Rating
AllMusic	3/5 stars

Drop is the debut album by the Scottish band the Shamen, released in 1987 on their own Moksha label.

== Track listing ==
=== Original UK 1987 release ===
1. "Something About You"
2. "Young 'til Yesterday"
3. "Passing Away"
4. "World Theatre"
5. "Through With You"
6. "Where Do You Go"
7. "Do What You Will"
8. "Happy Days"
9. "Through My Window"
10. "Velvet Box"
11. "I Don't Like"
12. "Strange Days Dream"
13. "Four Letter Girl"
14. "The Other Side"

=== Extra tracks on the UK 1999 CD re-release ===
1. "It's All Around"
2. "Grim Reaper of Love"
3. "Christopher Mayhew Says a Lot"
4. "Golden Hair"

== See also ==
- The Shamen discography
