= Ebeneezer Goode =

1992 single by the Shamen

Single by the Shamen

from the album Boss Drum
- Released: 24 August 1992
- Genre: Rave
- Length: 3:53
- Label: One Little Indian
- Songwriters: Colin Angus; Richard West
- Producer: The Shamen

The Shamen singles chronology
"LSI (Love Sex Intelligence)" (1992)	"Ebeneezer Goode" (1992)	"Phorever People" (1992)

Music video
- "Ebeneezer Goode" on YouTube

"Ebeneezer Goode" is a song by Scottish electronic music group the Shamen. Written by Colin Angus and Richard West, and remixed by the Beatmasters, the song became their biggest hit when released as a single on 24 August 1992 by One Little Indian, topping the UK Singles Chart for four weeks. The group's original version featured on the vinyl edition of their fifth album, Boss Drum (1992).

"Ebeneezer Goode" was one of the most controversial UK number-one hits of the 1990s due to its perceived oblique endorsement of recreational drug use, and it was initially banned by the BBC. It has been claimed the single was eventually withdrawn after the band were hounded by the British tabloid press, although the Shamen stated it was deleted while at number one due to its long chart run "messing up our release schedule". Its music video was directed by Richard Heslop and features Jerry Sadowitz.

== Lyrics ==
The song is best known for its chorus, "'Eezer Goode, 'Eezer Goode / He's Ebeneezer Goode", the first part of which is phonetically identical to "Es are good" – 'E' being common slang for the drug ecstasy. However, 'E' is also sung many other times during the song, ostensibly as 'e (i.e. he), such as in "E's sublime, E makes you feel fine". The lyric alludes to the advantages of the drug, though with an admonition against excessive use:

A gentleman of leisure, he's there for your pleasure
But go easy on old 'Eezer, he's a love you could lose
Extraordinary fella, like Mister Punchinella
He's the kind of geezer who must never be abused.

The song also contains references to the use of cannabis with ecstasy, referencing the rolling of a cannabis joint with the lines "Has anybody got any Veras?" ("Vera Lynns" being rhyming slang for "skins" or rolling papers) and "Got any salmon?" ("salmon and trout" being rhyming slang for "snout" or tobacco).

The "A great philosopher once wrote..." sample at the start of the song is Malcolm McDowell from Lindsay Anderson's 1973 film O Lucky Man!

== Critical reception ==
Pan-European magazine Music & Media said the song "is a thinly disguised tribute to the drug XTC, although some might think it's about nice chocolates". They added, "Whatever the moralists may say – 'naughty, naughty' like the lyrics [sic] in the intro – it's a brilliantly constructed pop song with both radio and club appeal as proved before by other Euro-crossover hits such as 'Move Any Mountain' and 'Love Sex Intelligence'." Andy Beevers of Music Week commented, "Bringing together very authentic old-fashioned acid house sounds and a cheeky rap, this has instant appeal and is going to be a huge hit. A word of warning, however: it will make 'absolutely outrageous, mate' this summer's most irritating catchphrase." James Hamilton from the Record Mirror Dance Update described it as "pure corny pop with a laddishly spoken and chanted very silly vocal about a geezer what's called Ebeneezer, punctuated by "wicked mate" comments and Sid James-like guffaws" and a "twittery bleeping jaunty bounder". Stuart Maconie from Select remarked "the full blown end-of-pier rave style" of the track.

In 2017, Mixmag ranked "Ebeneezer Goode" number four in their list of "10 of the Best Songs Celebrating Ecstasy", writing, "There'll never be another group like The Shamen, Scottish psychedelic evangelists fronted by a north London geezer (Mr C) who hit the top of the charts with an arch ditty about eccies. From the opening "Naughty, naughty, very naughty" to its blatant chorus – "Eezer Goode"(ie, "E's are good"!) – it mischievously characterised MDMA as an impish "Mr Puncinello". Its success was a cheeky daytime radio wink to a million pill-poppers at a time when rave was an all-encompassing national phenomenon."

== Chart performance ==
The song entered the UK Singles Chart at number six in September 1992, climbing to number one two weeks later (ironically during the BBC's drug awareness week) and staying there for four weeks. It was the UK's 13th-biggest-selling single of 1992.

In the US, Epic Records did not service the single to radio stations nor released the single commercially. They did, however, service the single to club DJs via two separate white labels: the first one with the UK mixes (catalog No. EAS 5001), and the second one with the US mixes (catalog No. AED 4917). The only information on these releases were the artist name, the name of the single, and the catalog number. "Ebeneezer Goode" received heavy club play in US clubs, but Epic Records did not hire a record club promoter to push the song up the Billboard Dance Club Play chart; therefore, DJs were not pressured to report the song back to Billboard. Because of its lack of promotion, the single charted only for one week, debuting and peaking at No. 2 on the Hot Dance Breakouts chart for the week ending 5 December 1992.

== Music video ==
The accompanying music video for the song consisted of club scenes intermixed with a caped man (ostensibly Ebeneezer Goode himself, played by Jerry Sadowitz) running around parts of a city. It was directed by British director of music videos and films Richard Heslop. Due to the use of flashing images in the video, some TV music channels make epilepsy warnings. Some channels, including VH1, edit the video to reduce the frame rate of these scenes, which deletes each bright frame.

== Performance on Top of the Pops ==
When the Shamen appeared on BBC1's Top of the Pops, Mr. C was expected to tone down the song due to its being broadcast. The group replaced the final lyric "Got any salmon?" with "Has anyone got any underlay?" When later asked about this in a radio interview, he replied it referenced rugs, not drugs.

== Count Binface reworking ==
In 2026, Mr. C, under the name "Sheman", reworked "Ebeneezer Goode" to be about the British novelty political candidate Count Binface, releasing it during the 2026 Clacton by-election in which Binface stood against Nigel Farage. The song featured new lyrics, with the chorus replacing "E's are Good" with "Bins are Good".

== Charts ==
=== Weekly charts ===
Chart (1992–1993)	Peak position
Australia (ARIA)	14
Austria (Ö3 Austria Top 40)	11
Belgium (Ultratop 50 Flanders)	23
Denmark (IFPI)	9
Europe (Eurochart Hot 100)	7
Europe (European Dance Radio)	4
Finland (Suomen virallinen lista)	8
France (SNEP)	43
Germany (GfK)	23
Ireland (IRMA)	1
Israel (Israeli Singles Chart)	1
Netherlands (Dutch Top 40)	19
Netherlands (Single Top 100)	26
New Zealand (Recorded Music NZ)	23
Norway (VG-lista)	2
Sweden (Sverigetopplistan)	11
Switzerland (Schweizer Hitparade)	17
UK Singles (Official Charts)	1
UK Airplay (Music Week)	7
UK Dance (Music Week)	1
UK Club Chart (Music Week)	14
UK Indie (Music Week)	1
US Hot Dance Breakouts Club Play (Billboard)	2

=== Year-end charts ===
Chart (1992)	Position
Europe (Eurochart Hot 100)	49
Europe (European Dance Radio)	11
Israel (Israeli Singles Chart)	39
Sweden (Topplistan)	70
UK Singles (OCC)	13
UK Airplay (Music Week)	50

== Certifications and sales ==
Region	Certification	Certified units/sales
Australia (ARIA)	Gold	35,000^{^}
United Kingdom (BPI)	Silver	200,000^{^}
^{^} Shipments figures based on certification alone.

== Release history ==
Region	Date	Format(s)	Label(s)	Ref.
United Kingdom	24 August 1992	—N/a	One Little Indian	
Australia	26 October 1992	CD; cassette	Liberation; One Little Indian	
Australia	9 November 1992	12-inch vinyl	Liberation; One Little Indian	
