= Hip house =

Music genre

- Other names: Rap house; house rap
- Stylistic origins: House; hip-hop; acid house; pop rap
- Cultural origins: Mid-to-late 1980s, London, UK, and Chicago, U.S.
- Derivative forms: Eurodance

Other topics
- List of house artists and DJs; styles of house music; ghetto house

Hip house, also known as rap house or house rap, is a musical genre that mixes elements of house music and hip-hop, which originated in both London and Chicago in the mid-to-late 1980s.

== History ==
A British collaboration between the electronic group Beatmasters and the rap duo Cookie Crew entitled "Rok da House" is cited as one of the first hip house tracks.

Minor controversy ensued in 1988 when a U.S. record called "Turn Up the Bass" by Tyree Cooper featuring Kool Rock Steady claimed it was the "first hip house record on vinyl". The Beatmasters disputed this, pointing out that "Rok da House" had originally been written and pressed to vinyl in 1986. The outfit then released "Who's in the House?" featuring British emcee Merlin, containing the lines "Beatmasters stand to attention, hip house is your invention" and "Watch out Tyree, we come faster". More claims to the hip-house crown were subsequently laid down by Fast Eddie in "Yo Yo Get Funky!", Rob Base and DJ E-Z Rock with "It Takes Two", and Tony Scott's "That's How I'm Living".

After successful releases by the Beatmasters, Deskee, Tyree, KC Flightt, Doug Lazy and Mr. Lee, hip-house became popular in the acid house warehouse scene and nightclubs. Hip house also garnered substantial chart success. The style complemented sample-based records of the period, produced by British artists such as S-Express, Bomb the Bass and MARRS.

Hip house tracks featured on popular dance compilations including Telstar's Deep Heat compilation series and was championed by DJs such as Chad Jackson.

As house music emerged as a worldwide industry by the late 1980s, U.S. acts such as C+C Music Factory would use the hip house formula in hits such as "Gonna Make You Sweat", as well as the Eurodance genre — particularly with hits by the Belgian group Technotronic and the German groups Snap! and Real McCoy.

== Influence on UK rave scene ==
Late 1980s hip house releases by UK artists such as Double Trouble and Rebel MC, Blapps Posse and Shut Up and Dance were an early influence towards the early 1990s UK rave scene and the breakbeat hardcore genre (and genres that developed from it such as jungle).

== Hip house in the present day ==
A modern form of hip house became popular in the mid-2000s, known as electro hop, with artists enjoying mainstream success towards the end of the decade and into the 2010s. These artists included LMFAO, Pitbull (most notably with his albums Rebelution (2009) and Planet Pit (2011)), Flo Rida, Far East Movement, Hyper Crush, Example (described as "rave-rap" or "rave-hop") and Azealia Banks. Electronic dance music DJs/producers also had hits in the genre, which featured vocals from rappers. These include "C'mon (Catch 'em by Surprise)" by Tiësto and Diplo with Busta Rhymes, and "Forever" by Wolfgang Gartner and will.i.am. French DJ David Guetta had several hip house hits such as "Memories" with Kid Cudi, "Where Them Girls At" with Flo Rida and Nicki Minaj, "Gettin' Over You" with LMFAO and "Little Bad Girl" with Taio Cruz and Ludacris.
