= En-Tact =

Studio album by The Shamen
- Released: 1 November 1990
- Recorded: 1989–1990
- Genre: Electronic
- Length: 69:33 (UK version); 65:18 (US version)
- Label: One Little Indian
- Producer: The Shamen

The Shamen chronology
Phorward (1989)	En-Tact (1990)	Boss Drum (1992)

Singles from En-Tact
- 1. "Omega Amigo" Released: 1989; 2. "Pro-Gen" Released: 1990; 3. "Make It Mine" Released: 1990; 4. "Hyperreal" Released: 1991; 5. "Move Any Mountain" Released: 1991

En-Tact is the fourth studio album by Scottish band the Shamen, released in 1990. It was the first Shamen album to feature Mr C, and the last to feature Will Sinnott (who died on 23 May 1991). It fused the band's past psychedelic rock sounds with the rave act it became, developing a style that represented multicultural dance music.

== Reception ==
Professional ratings
Review scores
Source	Rating
AllMusic	5/5 stars
Encyclopedia of Popular Music	3/5 stars
Entertainment Weekly	B+
The Great Rock Discography	9/10
Melody Maker	favourable
NME	7/10
Select	2/5
Vox	8/10

The album was included in the book 1001 Albums You Must Hear Before You Die.

== Track listing ==
=== Original UK 1990 release ===
CD (TPLP22CD) and cassette (TPLP22C)
No.	Title	mix/remix	Length
1.	"Human Nrg"		3:22
2.	"Progen (Land of Oz)" (Edit)	Paul Oakenfold	4:07
3.	"Possible Worlds"		3:45
4.	"Omega Amigo"	Steve Osbourne	4:44
5.	"Hyperreal"		4:32
6.	"Lightspan"	Irresistible Force	5:48
7.	"Make It Mine v2.5" (Evil Ed)	'Evil' Ed Richards	3:57
8.	"Oxygen Restriction"		3:48
9.	"Evil Is Even"		13:16
10.	"Human Nrg (Massey)"	Graham Massey of 808 State	4:36
11.	"Make It Mine v1.3 (Pirate Radio)"		4:54
12.	"Oxygen Reprise v2.0"		5:20
13.	"Hear Me O My People (Orbital - Delays Expected)"	Orbital	7:24

Vinyl (TPLP22)
No.	Title	mix/remix	Length
1.	"Human Nrg"		3:22
2.	"Progen" (Land of Oz Edit)	Paul Oakenfold	4:07
3.	"Possible Worlds"		3:45
4.	"Omega Amigo"	Steve Osbourne	4:44
5.	"Evil Is Even (Edit)"		4:20
6.	"Hyperreal"		4:32
7.	"Lightspan"	Irresistible Force	5:48
8.	"Make It Mine" (v2.5 Evil Ed)	'Evil' Ed Richards	3:57
9.	"Oxygen Restriction"		3:48
10.	"Hear Me O My People (Edit)"	Orbital	5:11

=== US 1991 issue ===
The version of En-tact released in the US, and in the UK from 1991 onwards, had a different track listing:

No.	Title	Mix/remix	Length
1.	"Move Any Mountain" (Progen - Beatmasters 7")	Beatmasters	3:28
2.	"Human Nrg (Massey)"	Graham Massey of 808 State	4:39
3.	"Possible Worlds: Deep PSI"		3:44
4.	"Omega Amigo"	Steve Osbourne	4:44
5.	"Evil Is Even [Edit]"		4:23
6.	"Hyperreal Orbit" (Early Fade)	William Orbit	5:22
7.	"Lightspan"	Ben Chapman	4:39
8.	"Make It Mine" (v1.3 Lenny D Vox)	Lenny Dee	3:32
9.	"Oxygen Restriction"		3:49
10.	"Hear Me" (O My People) (Edit)	Orbital	5:11
11.	"666 Edit" (Move Any Mountain)	'Evil' Ed Richards	4:48
12.	"Make It Minimal"		3:18
13.	"Hyperreal Selector" (Edit)	Jack Dangers of Meat Beat Manifesto	4:01
14.	"Lightspan Soundwave" (Edit)	Renegade Soundwave	4:19
15.	"Progen 91 [I.R.P. in the Land of Oz]"	Paul Oakenfold	5:21

== Charts ==
Chart performance for En-Tact
Chart (1990–1992)	Peak position
UK Albums (OCC)	31
US Billboard 200	138
