= Hyperreal (The Shamen song) =

Single by The Shamen

from the album En-Tact
- B-side: "In the Bag"
- Released: 25 March 1991
- Recorded: 1990
- Length: 3:13
- Songwriter(s): Colin Angus; The Shamen
- Producer(s): Colin Angus; The Shamen

The Shamen singles chronology
"Make It Mine" (1990)	"Hyperreal" (1991)	"Move Any Mountain" (1991)

Music video
- "Hyperreal" on YouTube

"Hyperreal" is a song by British electronic music group The Shamen. After it was remixed by William Orbit, it was released on 25 March 1991 as the fourth single from their fourth album, En-Tact (1990). A duet between Colin Angus and American singer Plavka, it reached number 29 on the UK Singles Chart and No.1 on the Indie Chart, their most successful single before the re-release of "Move Any Mountain" four months later. A remix 12-inch with remixes by Jack Dangers from Meat Beat Manifesto was released six weeks after the regular single, on 6 May 1991.

In the song, the title is not pronounced the usual way (hyper-real), but as four distinct syllables, with the stress on the second syllable: hy-per-ri-al. The kanji on the cover might be 吊 (tsu, suspended).

AllMusic's John Bush deemed the song an "infectious techno-pop anthem".

== Versions ==
Title	Length	Remixer	Available on
"Hyperreal"	4:31		En-tact (1990)
"Hyperreal LPEdit"	3:34		7", Cass
"Hyperreal Orbit"	5:45	William Orbit	12", CD
"Hyperreal Orbit" (Early fade)	5:22	William Orbit	En-tact (1991)
"Hyperreal Orbitedit"	3:13	William Orbit	CD, 7", Cass
"Hyperreal Dub"	3:25	William Orbit	12"
"Hyperreal Selector"	7:45	Jack Dangers	Remix 12"
"Hyperreal Selector" (Edit)	4:03	Jack Dangers	En-tact (1991)
"Hyperreal Dirty Dubbing"	3:50	Jack Dangers	Remix 12"
"Hyperreal Dirtiest Dub"	3:10	Jack Dangers	CD
"Hyperreal Maguire 1"	5:20	Mark McGuire	12"
"Hyperreal McGuire 2"	5:38	Mark McGuire	Remix 12"
"Hyperreal" (Remix)	5:03	Rico Conning	Volume One
"Hyperreal" (Live BBC 1, 1991)	3:20		On Air

All released in 1991, except En-tact (1990) and On Air • The BBC Sessions (1993). The "Hyperreal" single was released in five different formats in the UK: 7", Cassette, CD, 12" and Remix 12".

== Charts ==
Chart (1991)	Peak position
UK Singles (OCC)	29
UK Dance (Music Week)	22
UK Indie (Music Week)	1
