= Hempton Manor =

Studio album by The Shamen
- Released: September 1996
- Recorded: 1995–1996
- Genre: Techno, dub, drum and bass
- Label: One Little Indian

The Shamen chronology
Axis Mutatis (1995)	Hempton Manor (1996)	UV (1998)

Professional ratings
Review scores
Source	Rating
Allmusic	2.5/5 stars
Music Week	4/5 stars
Muzik	4/5 stars

Hempton Manor is the sixth studio album by Scottish electronic music group The Shamen, released in September 1996. Hempton Manor is inspired by and dedicated to hemp and featured a liner printed on hemp-based paper. "Hempton Manor" hybridizes tripped out techno, spacey dub and frenetic drum and bass styles. The decision to make it an entirely instrumental album was a deliberate ploy to break from their record label, One Little Indian. It is alleged to have been recorded in seven days to conclude the recording contract with One Little Indian, and the first letters of each track form an acrostic spelling out "Fuck Birket", referring to label founder Derek Birkett, who wanted the group to move back into more commercial territory.

== Track listing ==
1. "Freya"
2. "Urpflanze"
3. "Cannabeo"
4. "Khat"
5. "Bememe"
6. "Indica"
7. "Rausch"
8. "Kava"
9. "El-Fin"
10. "The Monoriff"
