= Phorward =

EP by The Shamen
- Released: May 1989
- Genre: Acid house, electronica
- Length: 23:06 (1989 10"); 47:45 (1989 CD); 32:12 (1999 CD reissue)
- Label: Moksha

The Shamen chronology
| In Gorbachev We Trust (1989) | Phorward (1989) | En-Tact (1990) |

Phorward is a mini-album by the Scottish band The Shamen. It was released in 1989 on Moksha Records. It was billed as a "mini album" because the original vinyl release had only six tracks.

== Background ==
On the CD version, DJ Eddie Richards remixed tracks including "You Me and Everything", "Reraptyouare", "Splash 2", and "Phorward", further expanding the musical impact the mini-album made on the acid house scene. It was reissued with slightly different tracks in 1999 on the Essential label.

The front cover image is a monochrome, heavily rasterized excerpt of the cover image on In Gorbachev We Trust.

== Track listings ==
=== 1989 10" ===
1. "You Me And Everything (Else)"
2. "Splash 2"
3. "Negation State"
4. "Reraptyouare"
5. "Strange Day Dreams '89" [written as "sdd89"]
6. "Phorward"

Track 3 ends in an infinite loop.

=== 1989 7" the s&n sessions ===
Some copies of the 10" came with a white label 7".

1. "Happy Days"
2. "Knature of a Girl"

The German version of Phorward was released on regular 12" vinyl, and appends these two tracks as the last track on each side, respectively.

=== 1989 CD ===
The 1989 CD and cassette issue contained three extra tracks (from the "You Me & Everything" 12-inch single) not found on the vinyl or the 1999 reissue.

1. "You Me And Everything (Else)"
2. "Splash 2"
3. "Negation State"
4. "Reraptyouare"
5. "Strange Day Dreams '89"
6. "Phorward"
7. "Happy Days"
8. "Knature of a Girl"
9. "You Me and Everything (Evil Edit)"
10. "Reraptyouare (Evil Edit)"
11. "Ed's Bonus Beats"
- Track 5 written as "sdd 89"
- Track 7–8 written as "the s & n sessions"
- Track 9–11 written as "evil edit (freakin' the beats **for a phurther 15 minutes)". Track 10 includes parts of "Splash 2" and "Phorward" between parts of "Reraptyouare"

=== 1999 CD ===
Digitally remastered, with new liner notes.

1. "You Me And Everything (Else)"
2. "Splash 2"
3. "Negation State"
4. "Reraptyouare"
5. "Strange Day Dreams '89" [written as "SDD 89"]
6. "Phorward"
7. "Happy Days"/"Knature of a Girl" [written as "The S and N Sessions"]
8. "Darkness in Zion"
