= Axis Mutatis =

Studio album by The Shamen
- Released: 7 November 1995
- Recorded: 1994–1995
- Genre: House; ambient house; electronic; trip hop
- Length: 64:42
- Label: One Little Indian

The Shamen chronology
Boss Drum (1992)	Axis Mutatis (1995)	Hempton Manor (1996)

Professional ratings
Review scores
Source	Rating
AllMusic	3/5 stars
Music Week	3/5 stars
Muzik	4/5 stars
NME	5/10
Select	3/5 medals

Axis Mutatis is an album by the electronic dance music group The Shamen which was released in 1995. The album did not receive as much positive feedback as their previous album, Boss Drum, nor was it as popular, but Axis Mutatis still remained a fairly successful release, with the band eventually releasing four music videos for it. A Deep Dish remix of "Transamazonia" appeared on the WipEout soundtrack.

The initial release of Axis Mutatis contained an additional instrumental album, Arbor Bona Arbor Mala.

== Critical reception ==
Music Week wrote, "The singalong techno pop is in full effect once more. This one needs a few listens before the hooks sink in, but the blend of ambience, beats and melodies finally wins over." Mark Sutherland from NME said, "The only redeeming feature is that The Shamen have, belatedly, discovered the joys of 'proper' songwriting. 'Neptune' and 'Heal the Separation' are consummate pop songs with proper pop song things like tunes and choruses." Garry Mulholland from Select felt "the action really begins when The Shamen serve up big wedges of that smelly, runny stuff that only a Euro-discophile can truly love. The single 'MK2A' and 'Heal the Separation' are packed with the sub-Kraftwerk tinklings, acid squiggling, floaty harmonies and love".

== Track listing ==
=== Axis Mutatis ===
1. "Destination Eschaton" – 3:55
2. "Transamazonia" – 3:52
3. "Conquistador" – 3:58
4. "MK2A (Dedicated to Nation of Hawaii)" – 4:05
5. "Neptune" – 4:16
6. "Prince of Popocatapetl" – 6:01
7. "Heal (The Separation)" – 3:55
8. "Persephone's Quest" – 5:05
9. "Moment" – 4:00
10. "Axis Mundi" – 7:04
  a. "Tellos"
  b. "Xibalba"
  c. "Nemeton"
  d. "Eternal Return"
11. "Eschaton Omega (Deep Melodic Techno Mix)" – 3:37
12. "Agua Azul – 11:23
13. "S2 Translation" – 3:31

=== Arbor Bona Arbor Mala ===
1. Asymptotic Eschaton – 0:48
2. Sefirotic Axis – 6:52
3. Entraterrestrial – 9:38
4. Demeter – 4:28
5. Beneath the Underworld – 3:34
6. Xochipili's Return – 8:28
7. Rio Negro – 3:16
8. Above the Otherworld – 1:21
9. A Moment in Dub – 9:20
10. Pizarro in Paradise – 6:02
11. West of the Underworld – 10:14
12. Anticipation Eschaton (Be Ready for the Storm) – 4:43
13. Out in the Styx – 3:08
