= UV (album) =

Studio album by The Shamen
- Released: 1998
- Recorded: 1997–1998
- Label: Moksha

The Shamen chronology
Hempton Manor (1996)	UV (1998)

Professional ratings
Review scores
Source	Rating
The Encyclopedia of Popular Music	3/5 stars

UV is the final studio album by the Shamen. It was released in 1998 under the Moksha label.

== Critical reception ==
The Guardian wrote that "tracks such as 'U Nations' lock in a funky tech-house groove, 'I Do' is a tribal refrain, while 'Mercury' and the incidental 'Beamship' exhibit ambient concerns."

== Track listing ==
1. "Mercury"
2. "Universal - 187 B.P. Metamix (Minor)"
3. "Palen - K"
4. "Beamship Captain is Insane-Crazy Mr Anderson Remix"
5. "I Do"
6. "Pop"
7. "Universal - 1999 Dance Vocal"
8. "Sativa '98"
9. "Serpent"
10. "U Nations - Mr C Club Mix"
11. "Marca Huasi"
12. "Sfynx - Technical Itch Mix"
13. "Metatron"
