= LSI (Love Sex Intelligence) =

1992 single by the Shamen

Single by the Shamen

from the album Boss Drum
- B-side: "Make It Mine"; "Possible Worlds"
- Released: 6 July 1992
- Genre: Techno; rave
- Length: 3:43
- Label: One Little Indian
- Songwriters: Colin Angus; Richard West
- Producer: The Shamen

The Shamen singles chronology
"Move Any Mountain" (1991)	"LSI (Love Sex Intelligence)" (1992)	"Ebeneezer Goode" (1992)

Music video
- "LSI (Love Sex Intelligence)" on YouTube

"LSI (Love Sex Intelligence)" is a song by Scottish band the Shamen with vocals by Jhelisa Anderson. It was written by Colin Angus and Richard West, and having been remixed by the Beatmasters, it was the first single taken from their fifth album, Boss Drum (1992). Released in July 1992 by One Little Indian, it achieved success in several countries, peaking at number one in Finland, number two in Israel, number four in Sweden, and number six in the United Kingdom. On the Eurochart Hot 100, "LSI" peaked at number 16. The accompanying music video was directed by Mathew Glamorre. The CD single also contains a remix of "Make It Mine", a song from the En-Tact album.

== Critical reception ==
Larry Flick from Billboard magazine wrote, "Wildly popular British rave act previews its upcoming U.S. sophomore set, Boss Drum, with an NRGetic workout that is splashed with acidic keyboard lines and pouty female vamping." Andy Kastanas from The Charlotte Observer found that "This has the ravish flavour of the Shamen's music with some additional female vocals thrown in for texture. Don't miss the house, techno, and break beat versions." Linda Ryan from the Gavin Report named it a "high-energy, no-apologies dance track". She stated that Jhelisa Anderson's vocal talent "is the ace-in-the-hole here, and this siren makes "LSI" move in a really big way." A reviewer from Melody Maker reckoned that the raps "are as strong as those" of "Move Any Mountain".

Andy Beevers from Music Week described the song as "intelligent acidic techno". Roger Morton from New Musical Express writing, "Clean as a whistle, the Shamen's first single of '92 pulses along flashing polished technology and irrefutable slogans. It's a piece of seamless, aerobic '90s pop automation that would do very nicely as a soft drink commercial theme". Another NME editor stated that "this should push the Shamen back into the charts." Johnny Dee from Smash Hits gave it a full score of five out of five, commenting, "LSI? Love, Sex, Intelligence if you're interested. And you will be, 'cos, like 'Move Any Mountain', this is a corkin' Hi-NRG anthem that snaps at your heels like an annoying Yorkshire Terrier and demands you dance. Odd folk but they know a cuffin' good groove when it tweaks their ear-lobes."

== Track listings ==
=== 7-inch single ===
Europe

1. "LSI" (Beat edit) – 3:45
2. "LSI" (Alternative edit) – 3:45

=== 12-inch maxi ===
Australia

1. "LSI" (Freaked Out V1.02)
2. "LSI" (Club Deep mix)
3. "LSI" (dance vocal)
4. "Possible Worlds"
5. "LSI" (Dub Rave vocal)

Germany

1. "LSI" (dance vocal) – 5:12
2. "Possible Worlds" – 3:27
3. "LSI" (Freaked Out V1.02) – 5:13
4. "LSI" (Club Deep mix) – 11:25

Denmark, France, UK

1. "LSI" (Freaked Out V1.02) – 5:13
2. "LSI" (Club Deep mix) – 11:25
3. "LSI" (dance vocal) – 5:12
4. "Possible Worlds" – 3:27

US

1. "LSI" (Ed Richards 12-inch mix) – 5:11
2. "LSI" (Beatmasters 12-inch mix) – 5:14
3. "LSI" (Shamen Alternative vocal) – 6:06
4. "LSI" (Frank De Wulf Dub Rave) – 4:29
5. "LSI" (Shamen Deep dub) – 6:00
6. "LSI" (Well Hung Parliament dub) – 5:41

=== CD maxi ===
Europe

1. "LSI" (Beat edit) – 3:45
2. "LSI" (Alternative vocal) – 6:06
3. "LSI" (Dub Rave vocal) – 4:37
4. "Make It Mine" (U.S. dub mix) – 4:25

US

1. "LSI" (Beatmasters 7-inch) – 3:40
2. "LSI" (Shamen 7-inch) – 3:51
3. "LSI" (E-Smoove 7-inch mix) – 3:35
4. "LSI" (Ed Richards 12-inch mix) – 5:11

== Charts ==
=== Weekly charts ===
Chart (1992–1993)	Peak position
Australia (ARIA)	53
Belgium (Ultratop 50 Flanders)	33
Canada Dance/Urban (RPM)	6
Europe (Eurochart Hot 100)	16
Europe (European Dance Radio)	10
Finland (Suomen virallinen lista)	1
France (SNEP)	30
Germany (GfK)	27
Ireland (IRMA)	15
Israel (Israeli Singles Chart)	2
Netherlands (Dutch Top 40)	29
Netherlands (Single Top 100)	20
Sweden (Sverigetopplistan)	4
Switzerland (Schweizer Hitparade)	19
UK Singles (Official Charts)	6
UK Airplay (Music Week)	8
UK Dance (Music Week)	10
UK Club Chart (Music Week)	7
UK Indie (Music Week)	1
US Dance Club Play (Billboard)	1
US Maxi-Singles Sales (Billboard)	1
US Top 40 Radio Monitor (Billboard)	72

=== Year-end charts ===
Chart (1992)	Position
Canada Dance/Urban (RPM)	38
Europe (Eurochart Hot 100)	93
Israel (Israeli Singles Chart)	21
Sweden (Topplistan)	26
UK Singles (OCC)	64
UK Airplay (Music Week)	53
US Dance Club Play (Billboard)	13
US Maxi-Singles Sales (Billboard)	13

== Release history ==
Region	Date	Format(s)	Label(s)	Ref.
United Kingdom	6 July 1992	—N/a	One Little Indian	
Australia	17 August 1992	CD; cassette	Liberation; One Little Indian	
Japan	21 August 1992	CD	One Little Indian	
Australia	7 September 1992	12-inch vinyl	Liberation; One Little Indian	
