= Move Any Mountain =

1991 single by the Shamen

Single by The Shamen

from the album En-Tact
- Released: 15 July 1991
- Genre: Techno-pop
- Length: 3:28
- Label: One Little Indian
- Songwriters: Colin Angus; The Shamen; Richard West
- Producers: Paul Carter; Richard Searle

The Shamen singles chronology
"Hyperreal" (1991)	"Move Any Mountain" (1991)	"LSI (Love Sex Intelligence)" (1992)

Music video
- "Move Any Mountain" on YouTube

"Move Any Mountain" is a song by Scottish electronic music group the Shamen, first released under the title "Pro›gen". With an official remix by the Beatmasters, the song was re-released in the UK in summer 1991, by One Little Indian, and was their first top-10 single, reaching number four in the UK Singles Chart. It was included on the band's fourth album, En-Tact (1990), and is also their only top-40 hit in the US, where the song peaked at number 38 on the Billboard Hot 100 in February 1992. Its accompanying music video was filmed in Tenerife, Spain.

== Release ==
In response to demand for remixes from fans, the band released the entire sample list and a number of remixes on the album Progeny, which at the time meant the single and album release of the track made it the only record to chart on both UK Singles and Album Charts at the same time.

The track was used for the entrance of Team Scotland during the opening ceremony of the 2014 Commonwealth Games at Celtic Park in Glasgow. The lyrics of the first verse also appeared as Super Hans' wedding vows in the second episode of the ninth series of Peep Show.

The cover includes the kanji 山 (yama, meaning mountain).

== Critical reception ==
AllMusic editor John Bush named the song an "infectious techno-pop anthem". Upon the release of "Progen", Bill Coleman from Billboard magazine described it as "an aggressive track that makes no bones about blurring the lines between industrial and house music." Another editor, Larry Flick, felt the track "may be best remembered as the most remixed record in history", adding that "at last count, there are 35 versions of this song circulating throughout Europe, seven of which are on this U.S. pressing. Beneath abundant studio tricks, which alter song's stance from techno to house and then hi-NRG, lies a simplistic and memorable modern-pop tune." Andy Kastanas from The Charlotte Observer deemed it "a bright uptempo dance trip that will have your hiney shakin' before you can say "rave"."

Dave Jennings from Melody Maker wrote, "'Pro›gen' starts brightly — the Shamen set up a spun-sugar dance sequence, croon 'move any mountain', and you begin to believe that they could. Then in crashes guest rapper Mr C, rambling feebly and implausibly about his supernatural abilities, and the record descends to the depths of mediocre rap-ego-stroking. Shame!" David Giles from Music Week stated that the Shamen "are at their pulsating, electrobeat best; a couple of rapping inserts from DJ Mr C rather detracts from the hypnotic overall feel, but it should enhance the record's credibility yet further in clubland." James Hamilton from Record Mirror viewed the track as a "catchy chanting I can move, move, move any mountain UK oldie". William Shaw from Smash Hits complimented its "humping great tower block of a hugely infectious dance chorus."

== Music video ==
The promotional video for "Move Any Mountain" was filmed on the slopes of Mount Teide, Tenerife. Shortly afterwards, Will Sinnott drowned off the coast of the neighbouring island La Gomera.

== UK releases ==
- Pro›gen (CD single 1990)
1. "Pro›gen ('Land of Oz' Mix)" – 5:42
2. "Light›span" – 5:41
3. "Pre›gen" – 5:48
- Pro›gen Remixes (12-inch single 1990)
1. "Pro›gen (C-mix F+)" – 7:01
2. "Pro›gen (7b)" – 3:50
3. "Light›span (Soundwave)" – 7:43
- Pro›gen (Cassette single 1990)
1. "Pro›gen (C-mix F-)"
2. "Pro›gen ('Land of Oz')"
3. "Light›span"
4. "Pro›gen (7a)"
- Move Any Mountain – Progen 91 (CD single 1991)
1. "Move Any Mountain (Beat Edit)" (remixed by the Beatmasters) – 3:30
2. "Move Any Mountain (Landslide Edit)" (remixed by the Kid & John) – 3:48
3. "Move Any Mountain (F2 Mello) – 6:12
4. "Move Any Mountain (Mountains in the Sky)" (remixed by Caspar Pound) – 6:03
- Move Any Mountain – Progen 91 (12-inch single 1991)
1. "Move Any Mountain (Landslide)" (remixed by the Kid & John) – 4:51
2. "Move Any Mountain (Devil)" (remixed by 'Evil' Eddie Richards) – 4:40
3. "Move Any Mountain (Rude)" (remixed by the Goat) – 5:03
4. "Move Any Mountain (I.R.P. in the Land of Oz)" (remixed by Paul Oakenfold) – 5:02
- Progeny (3x12-inch and cassette 1991)
1. "Move Any Mountain (Bang to the Beat of the Drum)" (remixed by Bryan 'Chuck' New & 'Evil' Eddie Richards) – 5:45
2. "Move Any Mountain (Beltram Dub)" (remixed by Joey Beltram) – 5:30
3. "Move Any Mountain (Rising High Dub)" (remixed by Caspar Pound) – 7:25
4. "Move Any Mountain (Alta Vista)" (remixed by F Troop) – 6:16
5. "Move Any Mountain (The Prelude to Paradise)" (remixed by Frankie Bones) – 5:12
6. "Move Any Mountain (666 Edit)" (remixed by 'Evil' Eddie Richards) – 4:49
7. "Move Any Mountain (Land of Oz)" (remixed by Paul Oakenfold) – 5:44
8. "Move Any Mountain (Beatmasters Dub)" (remixed by The Beatmasters) – 3:56
9. "Move Any Mountain (The Bones Break Mastermix)" (remixed by Frankie Bones) – 6:11
10. "Move Any Mountain (Beltram Vox)" (remixed by Joey Beltram) – 5:20
11. "Move Any Mountain (Landslide Vox)" (remixed by the Kid and John) – 5:27
12. "Move Any Mountain (Rude)" (remixed by the Goat) – 5:40
13. "Move Any Mountain (C. mix)" (remixed by Colin Angus and Mr. C) – 6:47
14. "Move Any Mountain (Beat Edit)" (remixed by the Beatmasters) – 3:30
15. "Move Any Mountain (Rude Edit)" (remixed by the Goat) – 3:44
16. "Move Any Mountain (Landslide Edit)" (remixed by the Kid and John) – 3:48
17. "Move Any Mountain (F Troop Edit)" (remixed by F Troop) – 3:27
18. "Move Any Mountain (Oz Edit)" (remixed by Paul Oakenfold) – 3:39
19. "Move Any Mountain (Bang Edit)" (remixed by Bryan 'Chuck' New & 'Evil' Eddie Richards) – 3:32
20. 16 samples & beats – 5:39

Note: The CD version of Progeny only contains 15 tracks, it omits tracks 8–12.

The "Alta Vista" mix is the same as the "F2 Mello" mix. The "Beltram Dub" mix, as published on Progeny, is the same as the "Beltram Vox" mix. "Move Any Mountain (Land of Oz)" on Progeny is the same as the original "Pro›gen ('Land of Oz' Mix)" (1990), slightly different from "Move Any Mountain (I.R.P. in the Land of Oz)" on the 1991 12", and from "Progen 91 (I.R.P. in the Land of Oz)" on En-Tact.

== Charts ==
=== Weekly charts ===
Chart (1991–1992)	Peak position
Australia (ARIA)	104
Belgium (Ultratop 50 Flanders)	8
Denmark (IFPI)	8
Europe (Eurochart Hot 100)	13
Europe (European Dance Radio)	20
Europe (European Hit Radio)	26
Finland (Suomen virallinen lista)	5
Ireland (IRMA)	17
Israel (Israeli Singles Chart)	11
Luxembourg (Radio Luxembourg)	6
Netherlands (Dutch Top 40)	23
Netherlands (Single Top 100)	17
Sweden (Sverigetopplistan)	21
Switzerland (Schweizer Hitparade)	4
UK Singles (Official Charts)	4
UK Airplay (Music Week)	13
UK Dance (Music Week)	10
UK Indie (Music Week)	1
UK Club Chart (Record Mirror)	8
US Billboard Hot 100	38
US 12-inch Singles Sales (Billboard)	1
US Dance Club Play (Billboard)	1
US Modern Rock Tracks (Billboard)	4
US Cash Box Top 100	34

Chart (1996)	Peak position
Scotland (OCC)	26
UK Singles (OCC)	35
UK Club Chart (Music Week)	1

=== Year-end charts ===
Chart (1991)	Position
Belgium (Ultratop)	81
UK Singles (OCC)	39
UK Club Chart (Record Mirror)	79

Chart (1992)	Position
US Maxi-Singles Sales (Billboard)	4

Chart (1996)	Position
UK Club Chart (Music Week)	42

== Release history ==
Region	Version	Date	Format(s)	Label(s)	Ref.
United Kingdom	Original	15 July 1991	7-inch vinyl; 12-inch vinyl; CD; cassette	One Little Indian	
Australia	Original	12 August 1991	12-inch vinyl; CD	Liberation	
United States	Original	26 September 1991	12-inch vinyl	Fokus	
Australia	Original	11 November 1991	CD; cassette	Liberation	
United Kingdom	"Move Any Mountain '96"	9 December 1996	CD; cassette	One Little Indian	
United Kingdom	"Move Any Mountain '96"	16 December 1996	12-inch vinyl	One Little Indian	
