= Phorever People =

1992 single by the Shamen

Single by the Shamen

from the album Boss Drum
- B-side: "Hyperreal Orbit"
- Released: 7 December 1992
- Genre: Techno; trance; house
- Length: 4:45
- Label: One Little Indian
- Songwriters: Colin Angus; Richard West
- Producer: The Shamen

The Shamen singles chronology
"Ebeneezer Goode" (1992)	"Phorever People" (1992)	"Destination Eschaton" (1995)

Music video
- "Phorever People" on YouTube

"Phorever People" is a song by Scottish electronic dance music band the Shamen. It features vocals by American singer Jhelisa Anderson and was released in December 1992 by One Little Indian as a single from their fifth album, Boss Drum (1992). The single topped the US Billboard Hot Dance Club Play chart and was another hit for the group in the UK, going to number five on the UK Singles Chart. It also became a top-10 hit in Denmark and Ireland, while reaching the top 20 in Austria, Finland, France, Israel and Sweden. A music video, directed by British director Richard Heslop, was made to accompany the song.

== Critical reception ==
Larry Flick from Billboard magazine described the song as "an exercise in chart-smart techno, trance, and house vibes." In their review of Boss Drum, Melody Maker concluded that "Phorever People" "would make an ideal next single", remarking that it's "actually sharper single material" than the "awful" "Ebeneezer Goode". Melody Maker editor Jennifer Nine commented, "I expect this record will serve as an excellent background for Club 18-30 disco nights and aerobics classes the world over. And the lovely Jhelisa Anderson (ex-Soul Family Sensation) is possessed of a voice of beauty."

== Track listings ==
- CD maxi, Germany and UK
1. "Phorever People" (Beatmasters East of the Nile Mix) — 6:35
2. "Phorever People" (Tee's Flying Dub) — 8:41
3. "Phorever People" (D's Mellow Dub) — 4:52
4. "Phorever People" (Mk Mix) — 7:44
5. "Phorever People" (Kevin Sauderson Technological Dub) — 4:55
6. "Phorever People" (Shamen Dub) — 3:56
- CD maxi, Germany and Denmark
1. "Phorever People" (Beatmasters Heavenly Edit) — 3:47
2. "Phorever People" (Shamen Mix) — 4:55
3. "Phorever People" (Shamen Dub) — 3:56
4. "Phorever People" (Beatmasters Heavenly Mix) — 6:05
- CD single
1. "Phorever People" (Beatmasters East of the Nile Mix) — 6:35
2. "Phorever People" (Tee's Flying Dub) — 8:41
3. "Phorever People" (D's Flying Dub) — 4:52
4. "Phorever People" (Mk Mix) — 7:44
- 7-inch and cassette single
1. "Phorever People" (Beatmasters Heavenly Edit)
2. "Phorever People" (Shamen Mix)
3. "Phorever People" (Shamen Dub)
4. "Hyperreal Orbit"
- 12-inch maxi, Denmark and UK
1. "Phorever People" (Beatmasters East Of The Nile Mix)
2. "Phorever People" (Tee's Flying Dub)
3. "Phorever People" (D's Mellow Dub)
4. "Phorever People" (MK Mix)
5. "Phorever People" (Kevin Saunderson Technological Dub)
- 12-inch maxi, France
1. "Phorever People" (Beatmasters Heavenly Mix) — 6:05
2. "Phorever People" (Shamen Mix) — 5:52
3. "Phorever People" (Beatmasters East Of The Nile Mix) — 6:05
4. "Phorever People" (Shamen Dub) — 3:53
- 12-inch maxi, Italy
1. "Phorever People" (Beatmasters East Of The Nile Mix)
2. "Phorever People" (Tee's Flying Dub)
3. "Phorever People" (D's Mellow Dub)
4. "Phorever People" (MK Mix)
5. "Phorever People" (Kevin Saunderson Technological Dub)
6. "Phorever People" (Shamen Dub)
- 2 x 12-inch maxi
1. "Phorever People" (Beatmasters Heavenly Mix)
2. "Phorever People" (Beatmasters East Of The Nile Mix)
3. "Phorever People" (Shamen Dub)
4. "Phorever People" (D's Pat Mix)
5. "Phorever People" (Tommy D's Swing Dub)
6. "Phorever People" (Tommy D's Joy Making Dub)
7. "Phorever People" (Tee's Flying Dub)
8. "Phorever People" (Todd's Urban Club)
9. "Phorever People" (Todd's Instrumental)
10. "Phorever People" (Mk Mix)
11. "Phorever People" (Kevin Saundersons Technological Dub)

== Charts ==
=== Weekly charts ===
Weekly chart performance for "Phorever People"
Chart (1992–1993)	Peak position
Australia (ARIA)	63
Austria (Ö3 Austria Top 40)	17
Denmark (IFPI)	10
Europe (Eurochart Hot 100)	16
Europe (European Dance Radio)	6
Europe (European Hit Radio)	21
Finland (Suomen virallinen lista)	14
France (SNEP)	12
Germany (GfK)	31
Ireland (IRMA)	7
Israel (Israeli Singles Chart)	19
Netherlands (Dutch Top 40 Tipparade)	3
Netherlands (Single Top 100)	47
Sweden (Sverigetopplistan)	14
UK Singles (Official Charts)	5
UK Airplay (Music Week)	10
UK Indie (Music Week)	1
UK Club Chart (Music Week)	4
US Dance Club Play (Billboard)	1
US Maxi-Singles Sales (Billboard) with "Boss Drum"	5

=== Year-end charts ===
Year-end chart performance for "Phorever People"
Chart (1993)	Position
Europe (Eurochart Hot 100)	98
Sweden (Topplistan)	100
US Dance Club Play (Billboard)	21

== Certifications ==
Certifications and sales for "Phorever People"
Region	Certification	Certified units/sales
United Kingdom (BPI)	Silver	200,000^{^}
^{^} Shipments figures based on certification alone.

== Release history ==
Release dates and formats for "Phorever People"
Region	Date	Format(s)	Label(s)	Ref(s).
United Kingdom	7 December 1992	7-inch vinyl; CD; cassette	One Little Indian	
Australia	30 January 1993	12-inch vinyl	Liberation	
Australia	8 February 1993	CD1; cassette	Liberation	
Australia	7 March 1993	CD2	Liberation	
Japan	21 April 1993	CD	One Little Indian	
