= Boss Drum =

Studio album by The Shamen
- Released: 14 September 1992
- Length: 64:55
- Label: One Little Indian
- Producer: The Shamen

The Shamen chronology
En-Tact (1990)	Boss Drum (1992)	Axis Mutatis (1995)

Singles from Boss Drum
- 1. "LSI (Love Sex Intelligence)" Released: 6 July 1992; 2. "Ebeneezer Goode" Released: 24 August 1992; 3. "Boss Drum" Released: 26 October 1992; 4. "Phorever People" Released: 7 December 1992; 5. "Re:Evolution" Released: 22 February 1993; 6. "Comin' On" Released: 25 October 1993

Professional ratings
Review scores
Source	Rating
AllMusic	4.5/5 stars
Encyclopedia of Popular Music	4/5 stars
The Great Rock Discography	8/10
Melody Maker	favourable
NME	7/10
Philadelphia Inquirer	3/4 stars
Select	4/5
Smash Hits	4/5

Boss Drum is the Shamen's 1992 album, released a year after the death of bassist Will Sinnott. It features their UK number one single "Ebeneezer Goode". Critics gave the album positive feedback and the album reached number three on the UK Albums Chart, and was certified platinum by the British Phonographic Industry in December 1992.

== Critical reception ==
Dennis Romero from Philadelphia Inquirer wrote, "Using the dry synthesizer sounds of techno, the chanting of rap, and the 120 beats-per-minute pace of "house" music, the group has, with this second album, pushed the technological edge further than Depeche Mode and Erasure ever have done. [...] While much popular music still promotes the protest values of the '60s counterculture, Boss Drum continues to profess the individualism and racial unity of today's youth. This carpe diem strain, found in "Phorever People" and "Space Time", for example, befit a twentysomething generation that internalizes values. Meanwhile, "LSI (Love Sex Intelligence)" is a catchy, soulful, house-paced jam that sounds chart-ready."

== Track listing ==
=== LP (TPLP42) ===
1. "Boss Drum" – 6:26
2. "LSI (Love Sex Intelligence)" – 3:43
3. "Space Time" – 4:58
4. "Librae Solidi Denari" – 5:26
5. "Ebeneezer Goode" (Band Mix) – 4:31
6. "Comin' On" – 4:27
7. "Phorever People" – 4:52
8. "Fatman" – 5:39
9. "Scientas" – 5:38
10. "Re:Evolution" (featuring Terence McKenna) – 8:22

=== Cassette (TPLP42C) ===
1. "Boss Drum" – 6:26
2. "LSI (Love Sex Intelligence)" – 3:43
3. "Space Time" – 4:58
4. "Librae Solidi Denari" – 5:26
5. "Ebeneezer Goode" (Beatmasters Mix) – 6:12
6. "Comin' On" – 4:27
7. "Phorever People" – 4:52
8. "Fatman" – 5:39
9. "Scientas" – 5:38
10. "Re:Evolution" (featuring Terence McKenna) – 8:22

=== CD (TPLP42CD) ===
1. "Boss Drum" – 6:26
2. "LSI (Love Sex Intelligence)" – 3:43
3. "Space Time" – 4:58
4. "Librae Solidi Denari" – 5:26
5. "Ebeneezer Goode" (Beatmasters Mix) – 6:16
6. "Comin' On" – 4:27
7. "Phorever People" – 4:52
8. "Fatman" – 5:39
9. "Scientas" – 5:38
10. "Re:Evolution" (featuring Terence McKenna) – 8:22
11. "Boss Dub" – 5:19
12. "Phorever Dub" – 3:53

== Charts ==
=== Weekly charts ===
Weekly chart performance for Boss Drum
Chart (1992–1993)	Peak position
Australian Albums (ARIA)	35
Austrian Albums (Ö3 Austria)	28
Dutch Albums (Album Top 100)	62
Finland (Suomen virallinen lista)	21
German Albums (Offizielle Top 100)	72
Swedish Albums (Sverigetopplistan)	35
UK Albums (OCC)	3

=== Year-end charts ===
1993 year-end chart performance for Boss Drum
Chart (1993)	Position
UK Albums (OCC)	62
