= The Shamen =

Scottish psychedelic band (1985–1999)

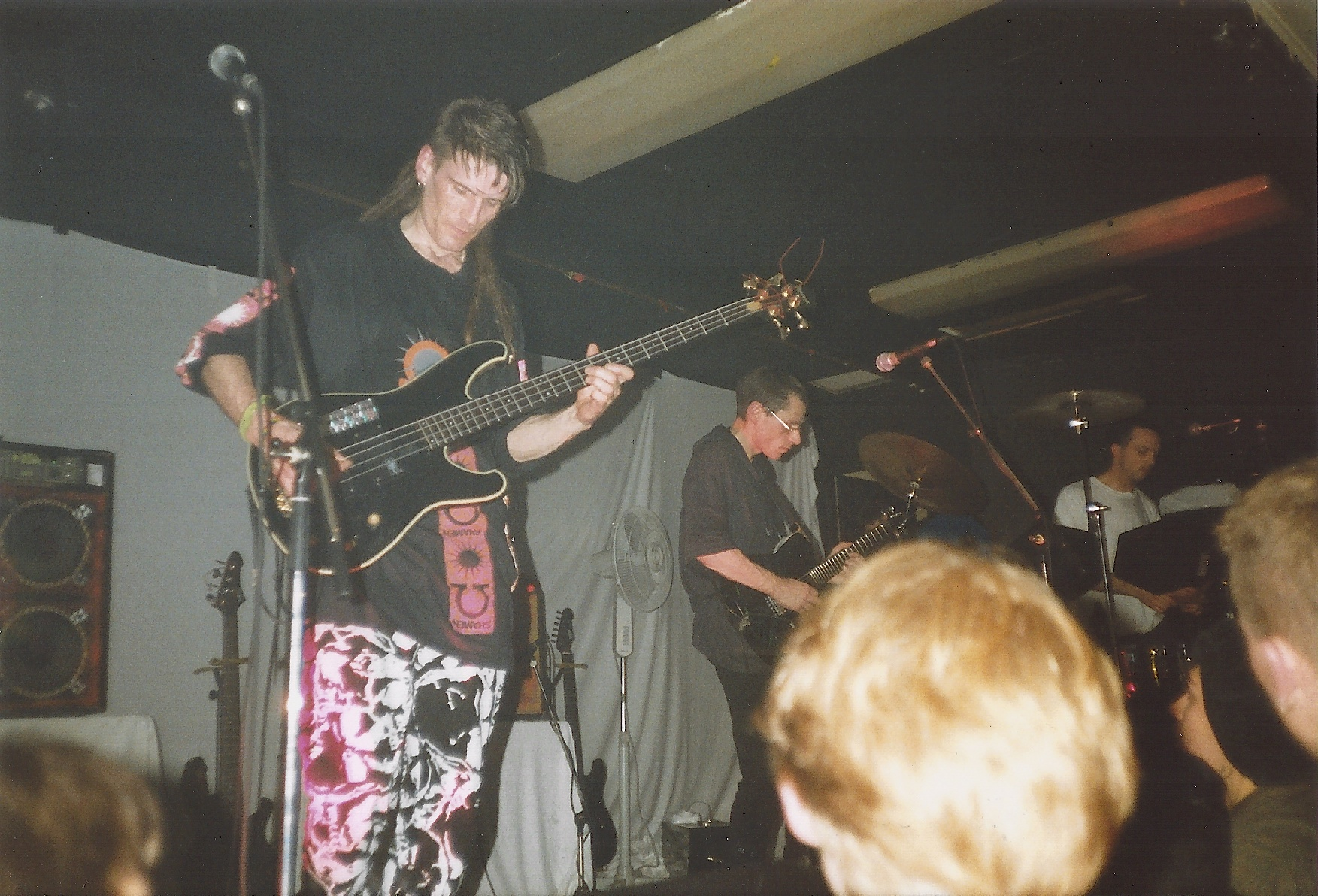
- The Shamen performing in Oxford (1990)

Background information
- Origin: Aberdeen, Scotland, United Kingdom
- Genres: Psychedelia; indie dance; electronic
- Years active: 1985–1999
- Labels: Moksha; One Little Indian; Epic
- Past members: Colin Angus; Bob Breeks; John Delafons; Gavin Knight; Plavka Lonich; Derek McKenzie; Keith McKenzie; Allison Morrison; Richard Sharpe; Will Sinnott (deceased); Peter Stephenson; Richard West (Mr C); Victoria Wilson-James; Jhelisa Anderson

The Shamen (/ˈʃeɪmɛn/ SHAY-men) were a Scottish psychedelic band, formed in 1985 in Aberdeen, who became a chart-topping electronic dance music act on the UK Singles Chart by the early 1990s. The founding members were Colin Angus, Derek McKenzie and Keith McKenzie. Peter Stephenson joined shortly after to take over on keyboards from Angus. Several other people were later in the band. When rapper Mr. C joined, the band moved on to international commercial success with "Ebeneezer Goode" and their 1992 Boss Drum album.

== History ==
=== 1980s ===
The Shamen were preceded by Alone Again Or, the Love-inspired name under which they recorded their first psychedelic electronic pop singles. After their name change, further singles picked up airplay from John Peel. Released in June 1987, the Shamen's first album, Drop, demonstrated their love of 1960s psychedelia.

By mid-1987, frontman Colin Angus was discovering the sounds of early house music pioneers, such as S-Express and M/A/R/R/S, and increasing his knowledge of the latest studio equipment. By September 1987, the Shamen were applying these techniques to their own music, mixing rock guitars, techno and hip-hop rhythms and sampled radio voices, which was to prove influential to groups like Jesus Jones and EMF. Their single "Christopher Mayhew Says", released in late 1987, was their first to experiment with beat machines and samples, fused with their psychedelic rock sound. However, the newfound sound proved too radical for co-founder and vocalist Derek McKenzie, who left the band in late 1987 to study at university. Glaswegian Will Sinnott (23 December 1960 – 23 May 1991), aka Will Sin, joined the group in October 1987, on bass and keyboards, freeing up Angus to handle vocals and guitar. Sinnott's musical background was an extensive one. He had already made an impression as part of the Can/SAHB influenced improvisation troupe Edith and the Ladies, and his father, a master wood craftsman, had made guitars for the Incredible String Band and John Martyn.

"Knature of a Girl" was the first record by the Shamen to feature Sinnott, but it was not until June's "Jesus Loves Amerika" single that the techno influence began to show. By this stage, Angus and Sinnott had become hooked on the acid house movement taking place in London, and its music and clubs were to exert an influence on the pair. Keith McKenzie and Peter Stephenson were less impressed by these new developments, and left the group the following summer, after the January 1989 release of the In Gorbachev We Trust album, which saw the group further enhancing their sound. Over summer 1988, they met Mr. C and Evil Eddie Richards, who later both worked with the Shamen to help them transition their music into the rave scene.

Angus and Sinnott relocated to London, allowing them to start afresh, and plunge into the emerging rave scene. 1989 was a busy year, as they set out on their Synergy tour, a nightclub experience, combined with live music from the Shamen and others like Orbital, and with DJing from Paul Oakenfold, Mixmaster Morris, Mr C, and Evil Eddie Richards. The tour was to last nearly two years. Synergy was innovative at the time, as a touring rock dance club introducing live bands to clubbers, and house, techno and ambient DJs to rock fans. The Shamen also released the Phorward mini album, produced by ex-Fiction Factory singer/songwriter Kevin Patterson.

=== 1990s ===
Their third album, En-Tact, was released in 1990, and it spawned the hit singles "Move Any Mountain (Progen '91)", "Hyperreal" and "Make It Mine". Also notable was the appearance of rapper, DJ and producer Mr. C, as well as incorporation of a female vocalist, Plavka Lonich – who was intended to become the focal point of the group. The transformation into a successful rave party act was complete. Tensions had already begun to show, however – the band's barely concealed espousal of the then-fashionable new psychedelic drugs and the artistic pressures of altering direction from that of an acceptably skilled guitar band to an electronic dance act. As they continued their Synergy tour, their popularity in the United Kingdom began to rapidly expand. "Hyperreal", released in March 1991, reached number 28 on the UK Singles Chart. By this time, they realised they were on their way to reaching mainstream popularity. Every Synergy Live show on the fifth and sixth leg of tours were sold out.

In May 1991, with the increased popularity of their band, Will Sin decided to release an EP entitled "U Make Me Feel" with an unknown female singer under the pseudonym Elsi Curry, and it was released as a promotional record. Later that same month, after the Sixth Mark of the Synergy Tour, and a one-week tour of Russia, the Shamen headed to Tenerife, to film a video for "Move Any Mountain". On 23 May, Will Sinnott drowned whilst swimming off the coast of La Gomera. Colin Angus later said: "When it first happened, I was still reeling from the shock of Will's completely unexpected and tragic death, and I couldn't think about the Shamen at all, couldn't see how anything could continue. But as I came to terms with it and thought about the situation I realised that what the Shamen was about was positivity and that positivity is like the spirit of the music and positivity acknowledges the need for change. So for those reasons I elected to carry on and also I knew that the name Shamen really meant a lot to Will and that was one of the main attractions for joining the band for him."

In July 1991, Plavka Lonich chose to leave the band, because she was planning to start on her solo career. After finding a new female singer, Cheryl Melder, the Shamen embarked on the start of their Progeny tour.

With Mr. C now a full-time member of the Shamen, and Soul Family Sensation's (Note: This One Little Indian act featuring Republica's Johnny Male were also known as Sensation when Jhelisa left the band.) Jhelisa Anderson (who was chosen to replace Plavka, as she was already a One Little Indian artist) providing guest vocals, the Boss Drum album followed in 1992. Boss Drum featured a spoken-word collaboration, "Re:Evolution" with Terence McKenna, and the Shamen's biggest and most controversial hit: "Ebeneezer Goode". "Ebeneezer Goode" was accused of promoting drug use, owing to the refrain, 'Ezer Goode, Ezer Goode' as homophonic with 'E's are good' (E being slang for the drug ecstasy), 'He's so good, he's Ebenezer Goode' (using the homophony of "he" and "E"), and to double entendre drug references throughout the song. This echoed similar references in previous songs such as "Synergy"'s 'MDMA-zing... we are together in ecstasy'. Despite – or maybe because of – the subsequent storm of publicity, the song reached the top of the UK Singles Chart and stayed there for four weeks.

Subsequent singles such as "Boss Drum" and "Phorever People" were chart hits, but Terence McKenna observed:

Nothing ruins you for the underground like success. So when Boss Drum went double platinum, they were obviously 'establishment'... I've talked to Colin about this, and he agrees. It would have been wonderful to hit it big at 23. At 35 it becomes a pain in the ass, and you just have to manage the money and the image.

However, the Shamen's new mainstream popularity enabled them to release an unusually large number of remix singles, EPs, and LPs during the Boss Drum era, including the "Face EP", the "S.O.S. EP", and the On Air and Different Drum albums. On Air featured a series of popular tracks from En-Tact and Boss Drum as performed live on BBC radio; Different Drum was a remix album containing alternate versions of every track from Boss Drum. The tracks "Boss Drum", "LSI (Love Sex Intelligence)", "Phorever People", "Ebeneezer Goode", and "Re:Evolution" were all released as singles in their own right. It was however impossible for the band to fully escape the shadow that Sinnot's death had cast across them. At a time and in a scene when performers were often both masked and anonymous, the emerging early 1990s dance music world had lost one of its more notable personalities.

Axis Mutatis was released in 1995, with new vocalist Victoria Wilson-James replacing Jhelisa Anderson. Early special editions of this album featured a bonus disk, Arbor Bona Arbor Mala, an experimental ambient album.

The group's Internet site Nemeton was amongst the first British music sites to host unique Web based events, e.g. releasing the first ever single and LP on the net in 1995, and it also features a piece of software devised by Angus to convert the DNA structures of human life into electronic music. "S2 Translation", a track on Axis Mutatis, was generated using this software.

The Shamen continued recording into the late 1990s, releasing two additional LPs with an increasingly experimental bent. Their penultimate studio album, the instrumental Hempton Manor, followed an acrimonious split with their label One Little Indian. It is alleged to have been recorded in seven days to conclude the recording contract with One Little Indian, and the first letter of each track spells out "Fuck Birket", referring to label founder Derek Birket, who wanted the group to move back into more commercial territory. UV, in 1998, was their last album. UV was released independently on Moksha Recordings.

Mr. C has since continued as a house music DJ and became a nightclub owner of The End club.

== Band members ==
=== Final lineup ===
- Colin Angus – vocals, guitar, keyboards, bass guitar (1985–1999)
- Bob Breeks – keyboards (1992–1999)
- Gavin Knight – drums, electronic percussion (1991–1999)
- Richard West (Mr. C) – vocals, keyboards (1990–1999)
- Victoria Wilson-James – vocals (1993–1999)

=== Former members ===
- Alexis Blackmore (Lex Icon) – vocals, keyboards, turntables (1990–1991)
- John Delafons – drums, electronic percussion (1989–1990)
- Plavka Lonich – vocals (1990-1991)
- Derek McKenzie – vocals, guitar (1985–1987)
- Keith McKenzie – drums, electronic percussion (1985–1988)
- Allison Morrison – keyboards, vocals (1985–1986)
- Richard Sharpe – keyboards (1991–1992)
- Will Sinnott (Will Sin) – bass guitar, keyboards, vocals (1987–1991, his death)
- Peter Stephenson – keyboards (1986–1988)

=== Touring members ===
- Jhelisa Anderson – vocals (1992–1993)
- Cody "The Chuck" H. – vocals (1991–1993)
- Cheryl Melder – live vocals (1991–1992)
- DJ Stika – turntables (1990)

== Discography ==
- Drop (1987)
- In Gorbachev We Trust (1989)
- Phorward (1989)
- En-Tact (1990)
- Boss Drum (1992)
- Axis Mutatis (1995)
- Hempton Manor (1996)
- UV (1998)

== See also ==
- List of Billboard number-one dance club songs
- List of artists who reached number one on the U.S. Dance Club Songs chart
- List of UK Singles Chart number ones of the 1990s
