= Tell Me the Way =

1995 song by Cappella

Single by Cappella

from the album War in Heaven
- Released: 10 July 1995
- Genre: Eurodance
- Length: 3:55
- Label: Media
- Songwriters: Gianfranco Bortolotti; Mauro Picotto; Luca Cittadini; Roberto Cipro; Paolo Sandrini; Diego Leoni
- Producer: Gianfranco Bortolotti

Cappella singles chronology
"Move It Up" (1994)	"Tell Me the Way" (1995)	"I Need Your Love" (1996)

Music video
- "Tell Me the Way" on YouTube

"Tell Me the Way" is a song by Italian musical group Cappella, released in July 1995 by label Media as the first single from their third studio album, War in Heaven (1996). It features new singer Alison Jordan, who replaced Kelly Overett after she left the group. The song was a hit in many European countries, peaking at number eight in Italy, number 15 in Finland, number 17 in the UK and number 20 in the Netherlands. On the Eurochart Hot 100, it reached number 33.

== Critical reception ==
In his weekly UK chart commentary in Dotmusic, James Masterton remarked that "Tell Me the Way", "no great departure from any of their previous hits", becomes their seventh Top 20 hit since 1989. Pan-European magazine Music & Media wrote that "as long as Cappella is around you can postpone Euro dance's funeral. The one-line chorus is simple but utterly effective, while the pumping synths will turn dancefloors into trampolines." James Hamilton from Music Week's RM Dance Update described it as a "distinctive high-pitched title line chant".

== Track listings ==
- 12-inch single, Italy (1995)
1. "Tell Me the Way" (House Mix) – 5:50
2. "Tell Me the Way" (R.A.F. Zone Mix) – 6:48
3. "Tell Me the Way" (T.S.O.B. Mix) – 5:53
4. "Tell Me the Way" (Tekno Kingdom Mix) – 5:58
- CD single, UK (1995)
1. "Tell Me the Way" (R.A.F. Zone Mix) – 6:53
2. "Move on Baby" (Armand Van Helden Mix) – 5:51
3. "U Got 2 Let the Music" (DJ Professor Mix) – 6:01
4. "Don't Be Proud" (CCQT Mix) – 6:03
- CD maxi, Australia (1995)
1. "Tell Me the Way" (Radio) – 3:38
2. "Tell Me the Way" (House Mix - Extended) – 5:28
3. "Tell Me the Way" (House Mix - Radio) – 3:55
4. "Tell Me the Way" (T.S.O.B. Mix) – 5:53
5. "Tell Me the Way" (Mars Plastic Mix) – 6:40
6. "Tell Me the Way" (Prof-X-Or Club Mix) – 7:10

== Charts ==
=== Weekly charts ===
Chart (1995)	Peak position
Belgium (Ultratop 50 Flanders)	27
Belgium (Ultratop 50 Wallonia)	30
Europe (Eurochart Hot 100)	33
Finland (Suomen virallinen lista)	15
France (SNEP)	35
Ireland (IRMA)	29
Israel (Israeli Singles Chart)	14
Italy (Musica e dischi)	8
Netherlands (Dutch Top 40)	20
Netherlands (Single Top 100)	24
Scottish Singles Sales (Official Charts)	16
Switzerland (Schweizer Hitparade)	35
UK Singles (Official Charts)	17
UK Pop Tip Club Chart (Music Week)	4

=== Year-end charts ===
Chart (1995)	Position
Netherlands (Dutch Top 40)	183

== Release history ==
Region	Date	Format(s)	Label(s)	Ref.
Germany	10 July 1995	CD	ZYX Music	
United Kingdom	4 September 1995	CD; cassette	Systematic	
