= List of UK Independent Singles Chart number ones of 1994 =

These are UK Official Indie Chart number one hits of 1994.Complied by Music Week

Issue date	Song	Artist	Record Label	ref
1 January	"I Was Born on Christmas Day"	Saint Etienne	Heavenly	
8 January	"I Was Born on Christmas Day"	Saint Etienne	Heavenly	
15 January	"Big Time Sensuality"	Björk	One Little Indian	
22 January	"Big Time Sensuality"	Björk	One Little Indian	
29 January	"Saturn 5"	Inspiral Carpets	Mute	
5 February	"In Your Room"	Depeche Mode	Mute	
12 February	"Can't Get Out of Bed"	The Charlatans	Beggars Banquet	
19 February	"Line Up"	Elastica	Deceptive	
26 February	"Move on Baby"	Cappella	Internal	
5 March	"Stay Together"	Suede	Nude	
12 March	"Stay Together"	Suede	Nude	
19 March	"Rocks/Funky Jam"	Primal Scream	Creation	
26 March	"Violently Happy"	Björk	One Little Indian	
2 April	"Violently Happy"	Björk	One Little Indian	
9 April	"Son of a Gun"	JX	Internal	
16 April	"The Most Beautiful Girl in the World"	Prince	NPG	
23 April	"The Most Beautiful Girl in the World"	Prince	NPG	
30 April	"Always"	Erasure	Mute	
7 May	"The Most Beautiful Girl in the World"	Prince	NPG	
14 May	"The Most Beautiful Girl in the World"	Prince	NPG	
21 May	"The Most Beautiful Girl in the World"	Prince	NPG	
28 May	"U Don't Have to Say You Love Me"	Mash!	React	
4 June	"Hymn"	Moby	Mute	
11 June	"Tree Frog"	Hope	Sun-Up	
18 June	"Lazarus"	The Boo Radleys	Creation	
25 June	"U & Me"	Cappella	Internal Dance	
2 July	"U & Me"	Cappella	Internal Dance	
9 July	"Ain't Nobody (Loves Me Better)"	KWS featuring Gwen Dickey	Network	
16 July	"Ain't Nobody (Loves Me Better)"	KWS featuring Gwen Dickey	Network	
23 July	"Smells Like Teen Spirit"	Abigail	Klone	
30 July	"Smells Like Teen Spirit"	Abigail	Klone	
6 August	"Run to the Sun"	Erasure	Mute	
13 August	"Run to the Sun"	Erasure	Mute	
20 August	"The Feeling"	Tin Tin Out featuring Sweet Tee	Deep Distraxion	
27 August	"Live Forever"	Oasis	Creation	
3 September	"Live Forever"	Oasis	Creation	
10 September	"On Ya Way '94"	Helicopter	Helicopter	
17 September	"Incredible"	M-Beat featuring General Levy	Renk	
24 September	"Incredible"	M-Beat featuring General Levy	Renk	
1 October	"Incredible"	M-Beat featuring General Levy	Renk	
8 October	"Incredible"	M-Beat featuring General Levy	Renk	
15 October	"Incredible"	M-Beat featuring General Levy	Renk	
22 October	"Move It Up/Big Beat"	Cappella	Internal Dance	
29 October	"Cigarettes & Alcohol"	Oasis	Creation	
5 November	"Cigarettes & Alcohol"	Oasis	Creation	
12 November	"Cigarettes & Alcohol"	Oasis	Creation	
19 November	"Small Bit of Love"	The Saw Doctors	Sharetown	
26 November	"The Wild Ones"	Suede	Nude	
3 December	"Believe"	Q-Tex	Limbo	
10 December	"I Love Saturday"	Erasure	Mute	
17 December	"I Love Saturday"	Erasure	Mute	
24 December	"Sweet Love"	M-Beat featuring Nazlyn	Renk	
31 December	"Sweet Love"	M-Beat featuring Nazlyn	Renk	

== See also ==
- 1994 in music
