= List of UK Independent Singles Chart number ones of 1993 =

These are UK Official Indie Chart number one hits of 1993.Complied by Music Week

Issue date	Song	Artist	Record label	ref
2 January	"Phorever People"	The Shamen	One Little Indian	
9 January	"Phorever People"	The Shamen	One Little Indian	
16 January	"Phorever People"	The Shamen	One Little Indian	
23 January	"Phorever People"	The Shamen	One Little Indian	
30 January	"Phorever People"	The Shamen	One Little Indian	
6 February	"I Can't Change Your Mind"	Sugar	Creation	
13 February	"I Lift My Cup"	Gloworm	Pulse 8	
20 February	"You're in a Bad Way"	Saint Etienne	Heavenly	
27 February	"You're in a Bad Way"	Saint Etienne	Heavenly	
6 March	"I Feel You"	Depeche Mode	Mute	
13 March	"I Feel You"	Depeche Mode	Mute	
20 March	"Animal Nitrate"	Suede	Nude	
27 March	"Animal Nitrate"	Suede	Nude	
3 April	"Animal Nitrate"	Suede	Nude	
10 April	"U Got 2 Know"	Cappella	Media	
17 April	"Ain't No Love (Ain't No Use)"	Sub Sub featuring Melanie Williams	Rob's	
24 April	"Ain't No Love (Ain't No Use)"	Sub Sub featuring Melanie Williams	Rob's	
1 May	"Ain't No Love (Ain't No Use)"	Sub Sub featuring Melanie Williams	Rob's	
8 May	"Ain't No Love (Ain't No Use)"	Sub Sub featuring Melanie Williams	Rob's	
15 May	"Ain't No Love (Ain't No Use)"	Sub Sub featuring Melanie Williams	Rob's	
22 May	"Walking in My Shoes"	Depeche Mode	Mute	
29 May	"Ain't No Love (Ain't No Use)"	Sub Sub featuring Melanie Williams	Rob's	
5 June	"So Young"	Suede	Nude	
12 June	"Hobart Paving"	Saint Etienne	Heavenly	
19 June	"Hobart Paving"	Saint Etienne	Heavenly	
26 June	"Human Behaviour"	Björk	One Little Indian	
3 July	"Radio"	Teenage Fanclub	Creation	
10 July	"Cherub Rock"	The Smashing Pumpkins	Hut	
17 July	"Belaruse"	Levellers	China	
24 July	"Belaruse"	Levellers	China	
31 July	"The Key the Secret"	Urban Cookie Collective	Pulse 8	
7 August	"The Key the Secret"	Urban Cookie Collective	Pulse 8	
14 August	"The Key the Secret"	Urban Cookie Collective	Pulse 8	
21 August	"The Key the Secret"	Urban Cookie Collective	Pulse 8	
28 August	"The Key the Secret"	Urban Cookie Collective	Pulse 8	
4 September	"The Key the Secret"	Urban Cookie Collective	Pulse 8	
11 September	"The Key the Secret"	Urban Cookie Collective	Pulse 8	
18 September	"The Key the Secret"	Urban Cookie Collective	Pulse 8	
25 September	"The Key the Secret"	Urban Cookie Collective	Pulse 8	
2 October	"Condemnation"	Depeche Mode	Mute	
9 October	"Condemnation"	Depeche Mode	Mute	
16 October	"Condemnation"	Depeche Mode	Mute	
23 October	"R.S.V.P. / Familius Horribilus"	Pop Will Eat Itself	Infectious	
30 October	"U Got 2 Let the Music"	Cappella	Media	
6 November	"U Got 2 Let the Music"	Cappella	Media	
13 November	"U Got 2 Let the Music"	Cappella	Media	
20 November	"U Got 2 Let the Music"	Cappella	Media	
27 November	"Feels Like Heaven"	Urban Cookie Collective	Pulse 8	
4 December	"Feels Like Heaven"	Urban Cookie Collective	Pulse 8	
11 December	"Big Time Sensuality"	Björk	One Little Indian	
18 December	"Big Time Sensuality"	Björk	One Little Indian	
25 December	"Big Time Sensuality"	Björk	One Little Indian	

== See also ==
- 1993 in music
