= Move It Up =

1994 single by Cappella

- Flarenasch cover

Single by Cappella

from the album U Got 2 Know
- Released: 26 September 1994
- Length: 4:15
- Label: Media (Italy); Internal Dance (UK)
- Songwriters: A. Pasinelli; C. Maifrini; D. Leoni; G. Bortolotti
- Producer: Gianfranco Bortolotti

Cappella singles chronology
"U & Me" (1994)	"Move It Up" (1994)	"Tell Me the Way" (1995)

Music video
- "Move It Up" on YouTube

"Move It Up" is a song by Italian group Cappella, released in September 1994, via various European labels, as the seventh single from the group's second studio album, U Got 2 Know (1994). The song features lead vocals by Jackie Rawe and was produced by Gianfranco Bortolotti, who also have co-writing credit. It charted in several European countries, with top-10 success in Finland, Italy and the Netherlands. In Ireland and the UK, it was issued as a double A-side with "Big Beat". Cappella's Kelly Overett told in a 2022 interview, that "Move It Up" is her favourite Cappella track.

== Chart performance ==
"Move It Up" was a European hit, although it did not reach the same level of success as "U Got 2 Let the Music" and "Move on Baby". The song was a top-10 hit in Finland (6), Italy (9), and the Netherlands (6). Additionally, it was a top-20 hit in Belgium (17), Switzerland (19), and the United Kingdom, as well as on the Eurochart Hot 100, where it reached number 19 after three weeks on the chart. On the European Dance Radio Chart, it peaked at number three, behind Heavy D & The Boyz' "This Is Your Night" and Ice MC's "It's a Rainy Day". In the UK, where "Move It Up" was issued as a double A-side with "Big Beat", it peaked at number 16 during its first week on the UK Singles Chart, on 9 October 1994; It spent two weeks at that position. On the UK Dance Chart, the song peaked at number ten. Outside Europe, the song became a top-10 hit in West Asia, where it peaked at number nine in Israel on 8 November 1994. It also charted in Australia, where it peaked at number 104 on the ARIA singles chart.

== Music video ==
The music video for "Move It Up" was directed by Wayne Holloway and produced by La La Land. It was filmed in Castle Films Studios in London, featuring singer/dancer Kelly Overett and rapper Rodney Bishop performing with dancers on a dancefloor. Jayne Robinson was responsible for the make-up in the video. It received "prime break out" rotation on MTV Europe and was B-listed on German music television channel VIVA in November 1994.

== Track listings ==
- 7-inch vinyl, UK (1994)

A. "Move It Up" (Fierce Edit)
B1. "Big Beat"
B2. "Move It Up" (KM 1972 Mix)

- 12-inch vinyl, Italy (1994)

A1. "Move It Up" (KM. 1972 Mix) — 5:40
A2. "Move It Up" (Plus Staples) — 7:30
B1. "Move It Up" (Mars Plastic Mix) — 6:05
B2. "Move It Up" (Magic Domingo Mix) — 7:00

- 12-inch vinyl, UK (1994)

A1. "Move It Up" (House Mix)
A2. "Move It Up" (KM 1972 Mix)
B1. "Big Beat"
B2. "Move It Up" (X Dub)

- CD single, Europe & UK (1994)
1. "Move It Up" (Fierce Edit) — 4:01
2. "Big Beat" — 4:23
3. "Move It Up" (KM 1972 Mix) — 5:37
4. "Move It Up" (House Mix) — 6:07
- CD single, France (1994)
1. "Move It Up" (KM 1972 Radio Edit) — 4:15
2. "Move It Up" (Club Mix) — 5:05
- CD maxi, Australia (1994)
1. "Move It Up" (R.A.F. Zone) — 5:34
2. "Move It Up" (House Mix) — 6:06
3. "Move It Up" (Mars Plastic) — 6:05
4. "Move It Up" (Magic Domingo) — 7:00
5. "Move It Up" (KM 1972) — 5:36
6. "Move It Up" (Club Mix) — 5:05
- CD maxi, Germany (1994)
1. "Move It Up" (Radio Edit) — 3:43
2. "Move It Up" (Fierce Edit) — 3:58
3. "Move It Up" (KM 1972 Mix) — 5:40
4. "Move It Up" (Plus Staples) — 7:30
5. "Move It Up" (Mars Plastic Mix) — 6:05
6. "Move It Up" (Magic Domingo Mix) — 7:00
7. "Move It Up" (Club Mix) — 5:05
8. "Move It Up" (Brescia Edit) — 5:53
9. "Move It Up" (R.A.F. Zone) — 5:32
- CD maxi, Scandinvia (1994)
1. "Move It Up" (R.A.F. Zone) — 5:32
2. "Move It Up" (House Mix) — 6:06
3. "Move It Up" (Mars Plastic) — 6:05
4. "Move It Up" (Radio Version) — 3:59

== Charts ==
=== Weekly charts ===
Chart (1994)	Peak position
Australia (ARIA)	104
Belgium (Ultratop 50 Flanders)	17
Europe (Eurochart Hot 100)	19
Europe (European Dance Radio)	3
Finland (Suomen virallinen lista)	6
Germany (GfK)	33
Ireland (IRMA) with "Big Beat"	26
Israel (Israeli Singles Chart)	9
Italy (Musica e dischi)	9
Netherlands (Dutch Top 40)	6
Netherlands (Single Top 100)	8
Scottish Singles Sales (Official Charts) with "Big Beat"	11
Switzerland (Schweizer Hitparade)	19
UK Singles (Official Charts) with "Big Beat"	16
UK Dance (Official Charts) with "Big Beat"	10
UK Indie (OCC)	1

=== Year-end charts ===
Chart (1994)	Position
Belgium (Ultratop 50 Flanders)	78
Netherlands (Dutch Top 40)	60
Netherlands (Single Top 100)	62
UK Singles (OCC)	165
