= 49ers (album) =

1990 studio album by 49ers

Studio album by 49ers
- Released: 1990
- Genre: Eurodance; Italo house
- Label: Island
- Producer: Gianfranco Bortolotti

49ers chronology
| 49ers (1990) | The Remix Album (1991) |

49ers is the debut album by Italian Italo house dance act 49ers, released in 1990 on the Island record label. It features the hit singles "Touch Me" (UK No. 3, AUS No. 18), "Don't You Love Me" (UK No. 12, US No. 78, AUS No. 61) and "Girl to Girl" (UK No. 31).

== Critical reception ==
Professional ratings
Review scores
| Source | Rating |
|---|---|
| AllMusic | 4/5 stars |
| Melody Maker | (favorable) |

In a retrospective review for AllMusic, Alex Henderson gave the album four out of five stars, describing most of the various singers on the album as having "big, substantial voices" and that the album's producer, Gianfranco Bortolotti, "sees to it that vocal personality is a prime ingredient of such exuberant offerings as "Girl to Girl," "Touch Me," and a remake of [Gloria] Gaynor's "I Will Survive"".

== Track listing ==
| No. | Title | Writer(s) | Length |
|---|---|---|---|
| 1. | "Touch Me" | Gianfranco Bortolotti; Pieradis Rossini | 3:40 |
| 2. | "I Need You" | Diego Leoni; Bortolotti; Ivan Gechele; Rossini | 3:45 |
| 3. | "I Will Survive" | Dino Fekaris; Freddie Perren | 3:55 |
| 4. | "Die Walkure" | Bortolotti | 3:40 |
| 5. | "Don't You Love Me" | Leoni; Bortolotti; Rossini | 3:55 |
| 6. | "How Longer" | Leoni; Bortolotti; Rossini | 4:05 |
| 7. | "Shadows (Remix)" | Bortolotti; Rossini; Stefano Lanzini | 3:55 |
| 8. | "Girl to Girl" | Bortolotti; Rossini; Pierre Feroldi | 3:30 |

== Charts ==
| Chart (1990) | Peak position |
|---|---|
| Australian Albums (ARIA) | 56 |
| Swedish Albums (Sverigetopplistan) | 41 |
| UK Albums (OCC) | 51 |
