= List of Billboard number-one dance singles of 1990 =

Billboard magazine compiled the top-performing dance singles in the United States on the Hot Dance Music Club Play chart and the Hot Dance Music 12-inch Singles Sales chart. Premiered in 1976, the Club Play chart ranked the most-played singles on dance club based on reports from a national sample of club DJs. The 12-inch Singles Sales chart was launched in 1985 to compile the best-selling dance singles based on retail sales across the United States.

== Charts history ==
Chart history
| Issue date | Hot Dance Music Club Play | | Hot Dance Music 12-inch Singles Sales | | Ref. |
| Issue date | Title | Artist(s) | Title | Artist(s) | Ref. |
|---|---|---|---|---|---|
| January 6 | "Rhythm Nation" | Janet Jackson | "Pump Up the Jam" | Technotronic Featuring Felly | |
| January 13 | "Two to Make It Right" | Seduction | "Pump Up the Jam" | Technotronic Featuring Felly | |
| January 20 | "Let the Rhythm Pump" | Doug Lazy | "Two to Make It Right" | Seduction | |
| January 27 | "C'mon and Get My Love" | D-Mob introducing Cathy Dennis | "Two to Make It Right" | Seduction | |
| February 3 | "1-2-3"/ "Underestimate" | The Chimes | "Two to Make It Right" | Seduction | |
| February 10 | "1-2-3"/ "Underestimate" | The Chimes | "Jazzie's Groove" | Soul II Soul | |
| February 17 | "I'll Be Good to You" | Quincy Jones featuring Ray Charles and Chaka Khan | "No More Lies" | Michel'le | |
| February 24 | "Escapade" | Janet Jackson | "No More Lies" | Michel'le | |
| March 3 | "Escapade" | Janet Jackson | "No More Lies" | Michel'le | |
| March 10 | "Escapade" | Janet Jackson | "Get Up! (Before the Night Is Over)" | Technotronic | |
| March 17 | "All Around the World" | Lisa Stansfield | "All Around the World" | Lisa Stansfield | |
| March 24 | "All Around the World" | Lisa Stansfield | "All Around the World" | Lisa Stansfield | |
| March 31 | "Keep It Together" | Madonna | "All Around the World" | Lisa Stansfield | |
| April 7 | "Touch Me" | 49ers | "Keep It Together" | Madonna | |
| April 14 | "Touch Me" | 49ers | "Keep It Together" | Madonna | |
| April 21 | "Let There Be House" | Deskee | "All Around the World" | Lisa Stansfield | |
| April 28 | "Heaven" | The Chimes | "The Humpty Dance" | Digital Underground | |
| May 5 | "Alright" | Janet Jackson | "Vogue" | Madonna | |
| May 12 | "Alright" | Janet Jackson | "Vogue" | Madonna | |
| May 19 | "Vogue" | Madonna | "Vogue" | Madonna | |
| May 26 | "Vogue" | Madonna | "Vogue" | Madonna | |
| June 2 | "The Power" | Snap! | "Vogue" | Madonna | |
| June 9 | "Dub Be Good to Me" | Beats International | "Vogue" | Madonna | |
| June 16 | "Pump That Body" | Mr. Lee | "Hold On" | En Vogue | |
| June 23 | "That's the Way of the World" | D-Mob with Cathy Dennis | "Hold On" | En Vogue | |
| June 30 | "Hold On" | En Vogue | "Hold On" | En Vogue | |
| July 7 | "Don't You Love Me" | 49ers | "The Power" | Snap! | |
| July 14 | "Don't You Love Me" | 49ers | "The Power" | Snap! | |
| July 21 | "Everybody Everybody" | Black Box | "The Power" | Snap! | |
| July 28 | "Everybody Everybody" | Black Box | "A Dreams a Dream" / "Courtney Blows" | Soul II Soul | |
| August 4 | "Everybody Everybody" | Black Box | "Policy of Truth" | Depeche Mode | |
| August 11 | "Dirty Cash (Money Talks)" | The Adventures of Stevie V | "Policy of Truth" | Depeche Mode | |
| August 18 | "Dirty Cash (Money Talks)" | The Adventures of Stevie V | "Everybody Everybody" | Black Box | |
| August 25 | "Groove Is in the Heart"/ "What Is Love?" | Deee-Lite | "Everybody Everybody" | Black Box | |
| September 1 | "Groove Is in the Heart"/ "What Is Love?" | Deee-Lite | "Everybody Everybody" | Black Box | |
| September 8 | "Groove Is in the Heart"/ "What Is Love?" | Deee-Lite | "Dirty Cash (Money Talks)" | The Adventures of Stevie V | |
| September 15 | "Let's Get Busy" | Clubland featuring Quartz | "Jerk Out" | The Time | |
| September 22 | "Let's Get Busy" | Clubland featuring Quartz | "Thieves In The Temple" | Prince | |
| September 29 | "Dance, Dance" | Deskee | "Thieves In The Temple" | Prince | |
| October 6 | "Dance, Dance" | Deskee | "Thieves In The Temple" | Prince | |
| October 13 | "This Is the Right Time" | Lisa Stansfield | "Groove Is in the Heart"/ "What Is Love?" | Deee-Lite | |
| October 20 | "Doin' the Do" | Betty Boo | "Groove Is in the Heart"/ "What Is Love?" | Deee-Lite | |
| October 27 | "Wiggle It" | 2 in a Room | "Groove Is in the Heart"/ "What Is Love?" | Deee-Lite | |
| November 3 | "Wiggle It" | 2 in a Room | "Hippychick" | Soho | |
| November 10 | "Livin' in the Light" | Caron Wheeler | "Hippychick" | Soho | |
| November 17 | "Found Love" | Double Dee featuring Dany | "Doin' the Do" | Betty Boo | |
| November 24 | "H.O.U.S.E." | Doug Lazy | "Knockin' Boots" | Candyman | |
| December 1 | "Gonna Make You Sweat (Everybody Dance Now)" | C+C Music Factory featuring Freedom Williams | "Livin' in the Light" | Caron Wheeler | |
| December 8 | "Gonna Make You Sweat (Everybody Dance Now)" | C+C Music Factory featuring Freedom Williams | "Wiggle It" | 2 in a Room | |
| December 15 | "Gonna Make You Sweat (Everybody Dance Now)" | C+C Music Factory featuring Freedom Williams | "Gonna Make You Sweat (Everybody Dance Now)" | C+C Music Factory featuring Freedom Williams | |
| December 22 | "Gonna Make You Sweat (Everybody Dance Now)" | C+C Music Factory featuring Freedom Williams | "Gonna Make You Sweat (Everybody Dance Now)" | C+C Music Factory featuring Freedom Williams | |
| December 29 | "Gonna Make You Sweat (Everybody Dance Now)" | C+C Music Factory featuring Freedom Williams | "Gonna Make You Sweat (Everybody Dance Now)" | C+C Music Factory featuring Freedom Williams | |

== See also ==
- 1990 in music
- List of Billboard Hot 100 number ones of 1990
