= Fits of Gloom =

Italian music project

- Origin: Italy
- Genres: Eurodance, Italo house
- Years active: 1990s
- Labels: MCA Records
- Members: Antonio Puntillo; Gianfranco Bortolotti; Mauro Picotto; Max Persona; Simone Pagliari

Fits of Gloom was an Italian music project, active in the 1990s. They had a 1994 hit with "Heaven", which reached No. 47 on the UK Singles Chart and a No. 49 hit with their version of "The Power of Love" featuring British singer Lizzy Mack.
