= Deskee =

German-American house music artist

- Born: Derrick Crumpley
- Origin: Queens, New York, U.S.
- Genres: House
- Occupations: DJ, producer, remixer
- Years active: 1989-present
- Label: Black Out

Deskee is the stage name for Derrick Crumpley, a German-American house music artist.

== Biography ==
=== Early life ===
He moved to Germany in 1984 with his mother, who was a member of the Armed Forces.

=== Musical career ===
Deskee became the main DJ for the road show called The Body Snatchers Road Show (members: Tillman, Williams, and Crumpley), and they played in several night clubs throughout Germany. Deskee shopped at the Frankfurt record shop, Boy Records, during the late 1980s to mid 1990s, and was approached by the shop owners A. Shepanski and N. Jordan, who informed him of a compilation album they were about to release on their new independent record label, Black-Out. Deskee teamed up with local DJ and record producer H. Felber and engineer M. Rodiger, producing "Let There Be House". Maximillian Lenz (a.k.a. WestBam) and Klaus Jankuhn added further work to the record. The lyrics for the song were co-written by Deskee and fellow rapper Tony Walton (a.k.a. True), who went on to work sign with Black-Out also.

Deskee scored three hits on the US Billboard Hot Dance Music/Club Play chart: two number-ones from 1990 ("Let There Be House" and "Dance Dance") and a top 20 hit in 1991 ("Kid Get Hyped", peaking at number 11). Deskee's singles also charted in the UK, where "Let There Be House" peaked at number 52, and "Dance, Dance" reached number 74 in the UK Singles Chart, as well as Spain, Italy and Japan.

== Discography ==
=== Singles ===
Year	Single	Peak chart positions		Album
Year	Single	UK	U.S. Dance	Album
1989	"Let There Be House"	52	1	Dancetracks
1990	"Dance, Dance"	74	1	Dancetracks
1990	"Kid Get Hyped"	81	11	Dancetracks
1991	"Lost in Groove"	—	—	Dancetracks
"—" denotes releases that did not chart

Preceded by "Touch Me" by 49ers	"Let There Be House"; Billboard Hot Dance Club Play number-one single April 21, 1990 one week	Succeeded by "Heaven" by The Chimes
Preceded by "Let's Get Busy" by Clubland featuring Quartz	"Dance, Dance"; Billboard Hot Dance Club Play number-one single September 29, 1990-October 6, 1990 (two weeks)	Succeeded by "This Is the Right Time" by Lisa Stansfield

== See also ==
- List of number-one dance hits (United States)
- List of artists who reached number one on the US Dance chart
