= Move Your Body =

Move Your Body may refer to:

- "Move Your Body" (Marshall Jefferson song), 1986
- "Move Your Body", by Phil Drummond, 1991
- "Move Your Body" (Anticappella song), 1994
- "Move Your Body", by Ruffneck (band), 1996
- "Move Your Body" (Eiffel 65 song), 1999
- "Move Your Body", a video by Hi-5, 1999
- "Move Your Body", by D'banj and Wande Coal, 2007
- "Move Your Body" (Beyoncé song), 2011
- "Move Your Body" (Sia song), 2016
- "Move Your Body", by Sean Paul, 2017
- "Move Your Body", by Öwnboss and Sevek, 2021
