= U Got 2 Know =

Studio album by Cappella
- Released: March 7, 1994
- Recorded: 1991 ("Everybody"); 1992–1994
- Genre: Eurodance; Hi-NRG
- Label: Mercury 828 482.2
- Producer: Gianfranco Bortolotti

Cappella chronology
Helyom Halib (1989)	U Got 2 Know (1994)	Move On Baby (1994)

Singles from U Got 2 Know
- 1. "Everybody" Released: 1991; 2. "U Got 2 Know" Released: 19 December 1992; 3. "U Got 2 Know (Revisited)" Released: 1992; 4. "U Got 2 Let the Music" Released: 18 September 1993; 5. "Move on Baby" Released: 10 February 1994; 6. "U & Me" Released: 13 June 1994; 7. "Move It Up" Released: 1 September 1994; 8. "Don't Be Proud" Released: 14 March 1995

Professional ratings
Review scores
Source	Rating
AllMusic	3/5 stars
Encyclopedia of Popular Music	2/5 stars
Smash Hits	4/5 stars

U Got 2 Know is the second and most successful studio album by Italian Eurodance act Cappella. It was initially released via the Mercury Records label on March 7, 1994, and later re-released via other labels with slightly different track listings. The album saw great success in many European countries, peaking at number one in the Swiss and Finnish charts. Eight singles were released from the album.

== Critical reception ==
Mark Frith from Smash Hits complimented the album as a "rather impressive debut LP".

== Track listing ==
No.	Title	Writer(s)	Length
1.	"U Got 2 Know"	Gianfranco Bortolotti, M. Persona, L. Carpella	5:10
2.	"U Got 2 Let the Music"	Ronnie Arduini, Gianfranco Bortolotti, Antonio Puntillo, Sam Zucchini	5:23
3.	"Don't Be Proud"	Bruno Guerrini, A. Pasinelly, Gianfranco Bortolotti, D. Leoni	5:07
4.	"U & Me"	Gianfranco Bortolotti	4:07
5.	"Everybody"	Gianfranco Bortolotti, Cliff Jones, P. Rossini	5:16
6.	"What I Gotta Do"	Mauro Picotto, Sam Zucchini, Gianfranco Bortolotti, G. P. Viani	5:04
7.	"Move on Baby"	Gianfranco Bortolotti, Bruno Guerrini	4:45
8.	"Shake Your Body"	Antonio Puntillo, M. Picotto, Gianfranco Bortolotti	4:46
9.	"The Big Beat"	M. Persona, S. Paganin, Gianfranco Bortolotti	4:19
10.	"Move It Up"	A. Pasinelli, C. Maifrini, Diego Leoni, Gianfranco Bortolotti	3:58
11.	"Cappella Gigamix" (DJ Mix – DJ Professor)		5:45

Note: The UK album release contains a longer, alternative mix of "U & Me" (track 4), clocking in at 4:26, which omits the female verses and has less of the 'U & Me, U & Me, U & Me forever' chorus.

== Chart performance ==
Peak chart positions									Certifications
AUT	AUS	FIN	GER	NED	SCO	SWE	SWI	UK	Certifications
8	90	1	10	11	9	12	1	10	SWI: Gold; UK: Gold
