= U Got 2 Know (song) =

1992 song by Cappella

Single by Cappella

from the album U Got 2 Know
- Released: 1992; 1993 (re-release)
- Genre: Eurodance; house
- Length: 3:46
- Label: Various labels
- Songwriters: Gianfranco Bortolotti; Lorenzo Carpella; Max Persona
- Producer: Gianfranco Bortolotti

Cappella singles chronology
"Take Me Away" (1992)	"U Got 2 Know" (1992)	"U Got 2 Let the Music" (1993)

Music video
- "U Got 2 Know" on YouTube

"U Got 2 Know" is a song by Italian Eurodance music group Cappella, released in 1992 by various labels. It was successful in clubs and was re-released in 1993. In 1994, it was included on the group's second album by the same name. The single was a top-10 hit in Ireland and the UK, peaking at number seven and number six. On the Music Week Dance Singles chart, it peaked at number one. It contains an uncredited interpolation of "Happy House" (1980) by British rock band Siouxsie and the Banshees and an uncredited vocal sample of "You Used to Hold Me" (1987) by Ralphi Rosario & Xaviera Gold. Vocalist Anna Ross and rapper MC Fixx It (Ricardo Overman) were chosen by producer Bortolotti for live performances. Cappella was later sued by Siouxsie and the Banshees for failure to pay publishing royalties and lost. In 2002, new remixes of the track were released as "U Got 2 Know 2002".

== Critical reception ==
John Bush from AllMusic named the song a "continent-wide Hi-NRG hit". In his weekly UK chart commentary, James Masterton said, "And not a Prince in sight either, despite the funny spellings. Cappella pop up out of Italy every so often to deliver to the charts a standard piece of Italia House, this one coming 4 years after the genre was trendy. Impressive." Andy Beevers from Music Week gave it a score of four out of five, declaring it as "another crowd-pleasing house stomper", noting that it's also using vocal samples from Ralphi Rosario's "You Used to Hold Me". He added, "It has been getting very positive club reaction and should make the Top 40." James Hamilton from the Record Mirror Dance Update described it as a "Siouxsie 'Happy House' synth based surging Italo pounder".

== Track listing ==
- 12", US (1992)
1. "U Got 2 Know" (A'la Carte Paris Mix) — 10:35
2. "U Got 2 Know" (Coffee Mix) — 5:22
3. "U Got 2 Know" (11AM At Trade Mix) — 6:36
4. "U Got 2 Know" (Extended Club Mix) — 5:21
5. "U Got 2 Know" (Underground Mix) — 4:43
- 12" maxi, France (1992)
1. "U Got 2 Know" (Coffee Mix) — 5:06
2. "U Got 2 Know" (Extended Club Mix) — 5:26
3. "U Got 2 Know" (Underground Mix) — 4:41
4. "U Got 2 Know" (A La Carte Paris Mix) — 10:35
5. "U Got 2 Know" (Overture) — 0:51
6. "U Got 2 Know" (Original Mix) — 3:53
7. "U Got 2 Know" (House Mix) — 4:18
8. "U Got 2 Know" (Fast Ending Mix) — 1:33
- CD single (Revisited), UK & Europe (1993)
1. "U Got 2 Know" (The Ultimate Edit) — 3:55
2. "U Got 2 Know" (3 AM Ultimate Mix) — 6:36
3. "U Got 2 Know" (4 AM Ultimate Mix) — 6:00
4. "U Got 2 Know" (Serie A Mix) — 4:49
5. "U Got 2 Know" (R.A.F.'s Maxizone Remix) — 5:19
6. "U Got 2 Know" (D.J. Professor's Ephemerals) — 5:37
7. "U Got 2 Know" (Martini Trance) — 5:19
- CD maxi, Germany (1993)
1. "U Got 2 Know" (Radio Coffee Mix) — 3:59
2. "U Got 2 Know" (Extended Club Mix) — 5:26
3. "U Got 2 Know" (Underground Mix) — 4:41
4. "U Got 2 Know" (Overture) — 0:51
5. "U Got 2 Know" (Original Mix) — 3:53
6. "U Got 2 Know" (House Mix) — 4:18
7. "U Got 2 Know" (Fast Ending Mix) — 1:33
- CD maxi, Germany (2002)
1. "U Got 2 Know" (Beam Vs. Cyrus Radio Edit) — 3:53
2. "U Got 2 Know" (Beam Vs. Cyrus Remix) — 6:31
3. "U Got 2 Know" (Joyenergizer Remix) — 6:54
4. "U Got 2 Know" (R.A.F. Mix) — 7:26
5. "U Got 2 Know" (Extended Club Mix) (1993) — 5:20

== Charts ==
=== Weekly charts ===
Chart (1993)	Peak position
Belgium (Ultratop 50 Flanders)	30
Europe (Eurochart Hot 100)	28
Europe (European Dance Radio)	2
Germany (GfK)	21
Ireland (IRMA)	7
Israel (Israeli Singles Chart)	3
Lithuania (M-1)	11
Netherlands (Dutch Top 40)	33
Netherlands (Single Top 100)	26
Switzerland (Schweizer Hitparade)	29
UK Singles (Official Charts)	6
UK Airplay (Music Week)	39
UK Dance (Music Week)	1
UK Club Chart (Music Week)	6
UK Indie (Music Week)	1

=== Year-end charts ===
Chart (1993)	Position
Europe (European Dance Radio)	16
UK Club Chart (Music Week)	53
