= Don't You Love Me (49ers song) =

Single by 49ers

from the album 49ers
- Released: 1990
- Genre: House; disco
- Length: 3:13
- Label: BCM; Media
- Songwriters: Diego Leoni; Gianfranco Bortolotti; Pieradis Rossini
- Producer: Gianfranco Bortolotti

49ers singles chronology
| "Touch Me" (1989) | "Don't You Love Me" (1990) | "Move Your Feet" (1991) |

Music video
- "Don't You Love Me" on YouTube

"Don't You Love Me" is a song by Italian house and Eurodance act 49ers. Produced by Gianfranco Bortolotti, it was released in 1990, by labels BCM and Media, as the fourth single from their debut album, 49ers (1990). It features a vocal sample from Jody Watley's 1987 hit "Don't You Want Me". On the European charts, it reached number 12 in the UK, number ten in Switzerland, number eight in Finland and number six in Ireland. In the US, it was the group's second and last number-one single on the Billboard Hot Dance Club Play chart, where it spent two weeks. "Don't You Love Me" was also the group's only entry on the Billboard Hot 100, peaking at number 78.

== Critical reception ==
Bill Coleman from Billboard magazine wrote, "Sample-happy Italian outfit follows No. 1, 'Touch Me', with an engaging, though less-inspired house jam, coated with disco coloring." In his weekly UK chart commentary, James Masterton viewed it as "lyrically unique". Paul Lester from Melody Maker said, "The 49'ers are the real deal when it comes to all this Italian disco chatter. It's utterly inhuman, "Don't..." follows the one mandatory all-robotic pulse and android sighs, entirely free of those hideous bids for "authenticity — the grafted-on gruff "soulful" vocals and homely house piano — that made 'Ride on Time' such painful foot-tapping." David Giles from Music Week felt the song "should do equally well both on the dancefloor and in the shops. It uses all the tricks of the Italian house formula in order to produce an urgent good-time track." In his book In Pista!, Italian writer Rocco Bargioni mentions Don't You Love Me among the Italo house songs that became very popular in Great Britain in early 90s, noting that “by then, the British had discovered that Italian house was cool, and there was no way to change their minds.”

== Charts ==
| Chart (1989–1990) | Peak position |
|---|---|
| Australia (ARIA) | 61 |
| Belgium (Ultratop 50 Flanders) | 36 |
| Europe (Eurochart Hot 100) | 29 |
| Finland (Suomen virallinen lista) | 8 |
| Ireland (IRMA) | 6 |
| Luxembourg (Radio Luxembourg) | 6 |
| Sweden (Sverigetopplistan) | 17 |
| Switzerland (Schweizer Hitparade) | 10 |
| UK Singles (OCC) | 12 |
| US Billboard Hot 100 | 78 |
| US Hot Dance Club Play (Billboard) | 1 |
| US Cash Box Top 100 | 77 |
| West Germany (GfK) | 25 |

== See also ==
- List of number-one dance singles of 1990 (U.S.)
