= Take Me Away (Cappella song) =

1992 song by Cappella

Single by Cappella
- Released: 1992
- Genre: Eurodance; disco; Italo house
- Length: 3:44
- Label: Various labels
- Songwriters: Lorenzo Carpella; Gianfranco Bortolotti
- Producer: Gianfranco Bortolotti

Cappella singles chronology
"Everybody" (1991)	"Take Me Away" (1992)	"U Got 2 Know" (1992)

Music video
- "Take Me Away" on YouTube

"Take Me Away" is a song by Italian Eurodance group Cappella. It samples American singer Loleatta Holloway's 1980 track "Love Sensation" and was released in 1992 via various European labels, as a single only. It was produced by Gianfranco Bortolotti and became a club hit as well as a top-30 hit in both the UK and Ireland, where it peaked at number 25 and number 17, respectively. The accompanying music video was directed by David Betteridge.

== Critical reception ==
Larry Flick from Billboard magazine described the song as "a technotinged hi-NRG rave", writing, "The Italo-producer/DJ interweaves her vocals into a spiraling arrangement of synths that are alternately rough and disco-smooth. Break out the platform boots for this one, kids!" James Hamilton from Music Week's RM Dance Update noted that Holloway's acappella of "Love Sensation" "once again provides the vocal samples for an italo house pounder, this consequently old fashioned but powerful urgent galloper".

David Quantick from New Musical Express commented, "Cappella — who did that fine 'Helyob Halim' record about a hundred years ago — return with a more techno sort of job which nicks all the RUNK RUNK RUNK bits off other records and adds little else. Very fast though". Siân Pattenden from Smash Hits wrote, "This record is more stormin' than a hurricane and has whirlwinds of plinkety plonky syntherisms to boot. It bounces along delightfully. Hurrah! Runner-up Single of the Fortnight."

== Track listing ==
- 12" single, UK (1992)
1. "Take Me Away" (Extended Mix) – 6:19
2. "Take Me Away" (Techno Mix) – 6:09
- CD single, UK (1992)
1. "Take Me Away" (Edit) – 3:44
2. "Take Me Away" (Extended Mix) – 6:19
3. "Take Me Away" (Techno Mix) – 6:09
- CD maxi, Japan (1992)
1. "Take Me Away" (Extended Mix)
2. "Take Me Away" (Techno Mix)
3. "Everybody" (Techno Mix)
4. "Everybody" (Soul Mix)
5. "Everybody" (Techno House Remix)

== Official mixes and remixes ==
- “Take Me Away” (Edit) 3:44
- “Take Me Away” (Radio Edit) 4:23
- “Take Me Away” (Extended Mix) 6:19
- “Take Me Away” (Techno Edit) 3:41
- “Take Me Away” (Techno Mix) 6:09

== Charts ==
Chart (1992)	Peak position
Europe (Eurochart Hot 100)	58
Ireland (IRMA)	12
UK Singles (OCC)	25
UK Dance (Music Week)	6
UK Club Chart (Record Mirror)	9
