= Komodo (Save a Soul) =

2000 single by Mauro Picotto

Single by Mauro Picotto

from the album The Album
- Released: 2000
- Length: 3:25
- Label: BXR
- Songwriters: Mauro Picotto; Andrea Remondini; Riccardo Ferri; Gianfranco Bortolotti
- Producer: Mauro Picotto

Mauro Picotto singles chronology
"Pulsar" (1998)	"Komodo (Save a Soul)" (2000)	"Proximus" (2000)

"Komodo (Save a Soul)" is a song by Italian trance producer Mauro Picotto. It was released in July 2000 as the fourth single from his album, The Album. The song had a great success in many countries and reached the top 10 in Austria, Germany, Ireland and Switzerland. The music video for the song features Mauro Picotto posing as a detective and travelling to stop a mysterious woman from killing men she meets.

== Track listing ==
1. "Komodo" (video edit) – 3:25
2. "Komodo" (Megavoices Claxixx mix) – 8:15
3. "Komodo" (Tea mix) – 7:53
4. "Komodo" (Megamind remix) – 7:09
5. "Komodo" (Saccoman mix) – 6:53
6. "Komodo" (alternative mix) – 6:19

== Charts ==
=== Weekly charts ===
Weekly chart performance for "Komodo (Save a Soul)"
Chart (2000)	Peak position
Austria (Ö3 Austria Top 40)	4
Belgium (Ultratop 50 Flanders)	15
France (SNEP)	60
Germany (GfK)	6
Ireland (IRMA)	2
Italy (FIMI)	17
Netherlands (Dutch Top 40)	19
Netherlands (Single Top 100)	11
Scottish Singles Sales (Official Charts)	6
Switzerland (Schweizer Hitparade)	4
UK Singles (Official Charts)	13

=== Year-end charts ===
2000 year-end chart performance for "Komodo (Save a Soul)"
Chart (2000)	Position
Austria (Ö3 Austria Top 40)	29
Germany (Media Control)	42
Italy (Musica e dischi)	99
Switzerland (Schweizer Hitparade)	29

2001 year-end chart performance for "Komodo (Save a Soul)"
Chart (2001)	Position
Belgium (Ultratop 50 Flanders)	92
Ireland (IRMA)	36
Netherlands (Dutch Top 40)	77

== Certifications ==
Region	Certification	Certified units/sales
Germany (BVMI)	Gold	250,000^{^}
^{^} Shipments figures based on certification alone.
