= List of number-one hits of 1994 (Austria) =

This is a list of the Austrian Singles Chart number-one hits of 1994.

Issue date	Song	Artist
2 January	"I'd Do Anything for Love (But I Won't Do That)"	Meat Loaf
9 January	"I'd Do Anything for Love (But I Won't Do That)"	Meat Loaf
16 January	"I'd Do Anything for Love (But I Won't Do That)"	Meat Loaf
23 January	"I'd Do Anything for Love (But I Won't Do That)"	Meat Loaf
30 January	"I'd Do Anything for Love (But I Won't Do That)"	Meat Loaf
6 February	"U Got 2 Let the Music"	Cappella
13 February	"All for Love"	Bryan Adams, Rod Stewart and Sting
20 February	"All for Love"	Bryan Adams, Rod Stewart and Sting
27 February	"All for Love"	Bryan Adams, Rod Stewart and Sting
6 March	"All for Love"	Bryan Adams, Rod Stewart and Sting
13 March	"All for Love"	Bryan Adams, Rod Stewart and Sting
20 March	"All for Love"	Bryan Adams, Rod Stewart and Sting
27 March	"All for Love"	Bryan Adams, Rod Stewart and Sting
3 April	"All for Love"	Bryan Adams, Rod Stewart and Sting
10 April	"Streets of Philadelphia"	Bruce Springsteen
17 April	"Streets of Philadelphia"	Bruce Springsteen
24 April	"Streets of Philadelphia"	Bruce Springsteen
1 May	"Streets of Philadelphia"	Bruce Springsteen
8 May	"Without You"	Mariah Carey
15 May	"Without You"	Mariah Carey
22 May	"Without You"	Mariah Carey
29 May	"Without You"	Mariah Carey
5 June	"Without You"	Mariah Carey
12 June	"Without You"	Mariah Carey
19 June	"Without You"	Mariah Carey
26 June	"Without You"	Mariah Carey
3 July	"Eins, Zwei, Polizei"	Mo-Do
10 July	"Eins, Zwei, Polizei"	Mo-Do
17 July	"Eins, Zwei, Polizei"	Mo-Do
24 July	"Eins, Zwei, Polizei"	Mo-Do
31 July	"Eins, Zwei, Polizei"	Mo-Do
7 August	"Eins, Zwei, Polizei"	Mo-Do
14 August	"Eins, Zwei, Polizei"	Mo-Do
21 August	"I Swear"	All-4-One
28 August	"I Swear"	All-4-One
4 September	"I Swear"	All-4-One
11 September	"I Swear"	All-4-One
18 September	"Love Is All Around"	Wet Wet Wet
25 September	"I Swear"	All-4-One
2 October	"I Swear"	All-4-One
9 October	"Love Is All Around"	Wet Wet Wet
16 October	"I Swear"	All-4-One
23 October	"I Swear"	All-4-One
30 October	"Hey Süßer"	Lucilectric
6 November	"Cotton Eye Joe"	Rednex
13 November	"Cotton Eye Joe"	Rednex
20 November	"Cotton Eye Joe"	Rednex
27 November	"Cotton Eye Joe"	Rednex
4 December	"Cotton Eye Joe"	Rednex
11 December	"Cotton Eye Joe"	Rednex
18 December	"Cotton Eye Joe"	Rednex
25 December	"Hey Süßer"	Lucilectric

== See also ==
- 1994 in music
