= Anticappella =

Italian music group

- Genres: Electronic
- Years active: 1990–1998
- Past members: Max Aventino; Rodney Bishop; Gianfranco Bortolotti; Lorenzo Carpella; Bruno Guerrini; Farrah; Jacqueline Jair; Ricardo Overman; Alessandro Pasinelli; Max Persona; Beverley Skeete

Anticappella were an Italian music group led by Gianfranco Bortolotti, the founder of Cappella. Their best-known hits were "2 √ 231" ("2 Square Root 231") and "Move Your Body", featuring rapper MC Fixx It.

== Discography ==
=== Studio albums ===
| Title | Album details |
|---|---|
| Anticappella | Released: 1998; Formats: CD |

=== Singles ===
| Year | Title | Peak chart positions | | | | | Album |
| Year | Title | ITA | AUS | IRE | SCO | UK | Album |
|---|---|---|---|---|---|---|---|
| 1991 | "2√231" | — | — | 12 | — | 24 | Anticappella |
| 1991 | "Everyday" | — | — | 17 | — | 45 | Non-album single |
| 1992 | "Movin' to the Beat" | — | — | — | — | — | Anticappella |
| 1993 | "I Wanna Love You" | — | — | — | — | — | Anticappella |
| 1994 | "Move Your Body" | 21 | 80 | — | 16 | 21 | Anticappella |
| 1994 | "Express Your Freedom" | — | — | — | 28 | 31 | Anticappella |
| 1996 | "2√231/Move Your Body" (Remix) | — | — | — | 45 | 54 | Anticappella |
| 1998 | "Get Faster" | — | — | — | — | — | Anticappella |
"—" denotes items that did not chart or were not released in that territory.
