= Move Your Body (Anticappella song) =

Single by Anticappella featuring MC Fixx It

from the album Anticappella
- Released: 13 June 1994
- Genre: Eurodance; hip house
- Length: 4:00
- Label: Media Records; Underground; ZYK Music
- Songwriters: A. Pasinelli; C. Maifrini; D. Leoni; G. Bortolotti; G. Elmzoom; M. Castrezza; R. Overman; S. Zucchini
- Producer: Gianfranco Bortolotti

Anticappella featuring MC Fixx It singles chronology
"I Wanna Love You" (1993)	"Move Your Body" (1994)	"Express Your Freedom" (1994)

Music video
- "Move Your Body" on YouTube

"Move Your Body" is a song by Italian music group Anticappella, led by Gianfranco Bortolotti, the founder of Cappella, and features rapper MC Fixx. The song was released in June 1994, via various labels as the fourth single from the group's only album, Anticappella (1998), becoming their most successful release. It charted in several countries, becoming a top-20 hit in Italy, Scotland and Spain, and a top-30 hit in the UK, where it peaked at number 21. On the Music Week Dance Singles chart, "Move Your Body" peaked at number eight. The song also charted in Australia, Ireland and France.

== Critical reception ==
Richard Smith from Melody Maker named the song "a big slice of cheese that'll probably go down a storm in the sort of clubs that put "Smart Dress Only. Over 18s. ROAR. Free Admission For Ladies Before Midnight" on their flyers." Alan Jones from Music Week wrote, "More frenetic Italian dance music, very similar in style to Anticappella's near-namesakes Cappella, with pounding rhythms, prominent keyboards, wailing diva and rap. Ideally suited to the Top 40." David Quantick from NME said it "will sell warehouses full of singles and make dancefloors everywhere happier places." In January 1994, James Hamilton from the Record Mirror Dance Update described it as a "synth blazed cheesey 0-134bpm Euro hip house stormer with similar appeal [to Culture Beat's 'Anything']". Later, in June same year, he named it a "diva nagged archetypal commercial Euro galloper".

== Track listing ==
- 12", Italy (1994)
1. "Move Your Body" (Extended Mix)
2. "Move Your Body" (Radio Mix)
3. "Move Your Body" (Technotrance Mix)
4. "Move Your Body" (Acappella Mix)
- CD single, Australia & New Zealand (1994)
1. "Move Your Body" (Extended Mix) — 6:27
2. "Move Your Body" (Radio Mix) — 6:50
3. "Move Your Body" (Technotrance Mix) — 5:31
- CD single, France (1994)
1. "Move Your Body" (Radio Version) — 4:25
2. "Move Your Body" (Extended Mix) — 6:19
- CD maxi, Germany (1994)
1. "Move Your Body" (Radio Mix) — 4:00
2. "Move Your Body" (Extended Mix) — 6:20
3. "Move Your Body" (Radio Extended Mix) — 6:40
4. "Move Your Body" (Technotrance Mix) — 5:30
5. "Move Your Body" (Acappella) — 1:21

== Charts ==
Chart (1994)	Peak positions
Australia (ARIA)	80
Europe (Eurochart Hot 100)	80
Italy (Musica e dischi)	18
Scotland (OCC)	16
Spain (AFYVE)	16
UK Singles (OCC)	21
UK Dance (OCC)	30
UK Dance (Music Week)	8
UK Club Chart (Music Week)	18
