= Touch Me (49ers song) =

Single by 49ers

from the album 49ers
- B-side: "Remix"
- Released: 4 December 1989
- Genre: Italo house
- Length: 3:43
- Label: Island
- Songwriters: Narada Michael Walden; Gianfranco Bortolotti; Paul Witts; Rob Manley; Preston W. Glass; Pietro Rossini
- Producer: Gianfranco Bortolotti

49ers singles chronology
"Shadows" (1989)	"Touch Me" (1989)	"Don't You Love Me" (1990)

Music video
- "Touch Me" on YouTube

"Touch Me" is an Italo house song by Italian group 49ers. Produced by Gianfranco Bortolotti, it was released on 4 December 1989 by label Island as the third single from their debut album, 49ers (1990). The song received favorable reviews from music critics, reaching number three on the UK Singles Chart and it was a top-10 hit in at least 10 other countries in Europe. Outside Europe, it was the first of four hits on the US Billboard Hot Dance Club Play chart for 49ers. It samples Aretha Franklin's "Rock-A-Lott" from 1987 and Alisha Warren's "Touch Me". The accompanying music video features singer Dawn Mitchell, 49ers frontwoman at the time.

== Chart performance ==
"Touch Me" was quite successful on the charts across several continents. The song remains the group's biggest hit, peaking at number-one on both the Billboard Hot Dance Club Play chart in the United States and the RPM Dance/Urban chart in Canada. It spent two weeks at number-one and a total of eleven weeks on the Billboard dance chart. In Europe, the single became a top-10 hit in Austria (9), Denmark (5), Finland (3), Greece (3), Ireland (4), Luxembourg (2), Spain (6), Sweden (8), Switzerland (6), the UK (3) and West Germany (7). In the UK, it peaked at number three in its sixth week at the UK Singles Chart, on January 14, 1990. Additionally, "Touch Me" was a top-20 hit in Belgium and the Netherlands. On the Eurochart Hot 100, it peaked at number seven on January 27, after three weeks on the chart. In Oceania, it also entered the top 20, peaking at numbers 15 and 18 in New Zealand and Australia, respectively.

== Critical reception ==
AllMusic editor Alex Henderson noted that Italian producer Gianfranco Bortolotti "sees to it that vocal personality is a prime ingredient of such exuberant offerings" as "Touch Me". Bill Coleman from Billboard magazine described the song as a "soulful 'Ride On Time'-style workout", noting that "strong production and a contagious chorus render track satisfying." He added that "the energetic technotrack utilizes the a cappellas (and quite well actually)" of Aretha Franklin's "Rock-A-Lott" and Alisha Warren's modest UK hit "Touch Me". Ernest Hardy from Cash Box found that inspired by the success of Black Box and "Ride On Time", "this one finds Aretha Franklin in the Loleatta Holloway role." He concluded, "It is full of energy".

Bob Stanley from Melody Maker named it "a beautifully constructed rip-off of 'Ride On Time' (which in turn was a beautifully constructed rip-off of 'Theme from S'Express')." In 1994, Melody Maker editors Peter Paphides and Simon Price remarked that merging of Italo and garage had resulted in "a million fantastic, brutally poppy house tracks with loads of sampled screaming divas", like "Touch Me". Music & Media considered it "storming dance material with house rhythm and loads of samples. Definitely a record with chart and dance floor potential. Listen up." Lola Borg from Smash Hits complimented it as "genuine Italian house music", noting that "it sounds like a cross between Lil Louis (with mad barking dogs) and Black Box and it's fiendishly good and can only be appreciated fully by wiggling all over the shop whilst it's on at full blast." Another Smash Hits editor, Ian Cranna, praised the single as "glorious", with "prime quality Italian house-thumping beats ahoy, rousing piano and strings galore and singalong catchy pop bits all over the shop."

== Track listing ==
- 7" single, West Germany, Austria & Switzerland (1989)
1. "Touch Me" (Radio Version) — 3:43
2. "Touch Me" (Instrumental Edit) — 3:40
- 12" single, West Germany, Austria & Switzerland (1989)
1. "Touch Me" (Sexual Version) — 6:06
2. "Touch Me" (Radio Version) — 3:43
3. "Touch Me" (Instrumental) — 5:50
- CD maxi, West Germany, Austria & Switzerland (1990)
1. "Touch Me" (Radio Version) — 3:43
2. "Touch Me" (Hard Core Remix) — 5:36
3. "Touch Me" (Hard Core Version) — 6:26
4. "Touch Me" (Sexual Version) — 5:53
5. "Touch Me" (Instrumental) — 5:50

== Charts ==
=== Weekly charts ===
Chart (1989–1990)	Peak position
Australia (ARIA)	18
Austria (Ö3 Austria Top 40)	9
Belgium (Ultratop 50 Flanders)	20
Belgium (VRT Top 30 Flanders)	12
Canada Dance/Urban (RPM)	1
Denmark (IFPI)	5
Europe (Eurochart Hot 100)	7
Finland (Suomen virallinen lista)	3
Greece (IFPI)	3
Ireland (IRMA)	4
Israel (Israeli Singles Chart)	3
Luxembourg (Radio Luxembourg)	2
Netherlands (Dutch Top 40)	13
Netherlands (Single Top 100)	18
New Zealand (Recorded Music NZ)	15
Spain (AFYVE)	6
Sweden (Sverigetopplistan)	8
Switzerland (Schweizer Hitparade)	6
UK Singles (OCC)	3
US 12-inch Singles Sales (Billboard)	7
US Dance Club Play (Billboard)	1
West Germany (Media Control)	7

=== Year-end charts ===
Chart (1990)	Position
Canada Dance/Urban (RPM)	10
Germany (Media Control)	62
Sweden (Topplistan)	61
UK Club Chart (Record Mirror)	34
US Dance Club Play (Billboard)	21
