= U & Me =

1994 single by Cappella

Single by Cappella

from the album U Got 2 Know
- Released: 6 June 1994
- Genre: Eurodance; Italo dance; hip house
- Length: 3:17
- Label: Media
- Songwriters: C. Piccinelli; Diego Leoni; Gianfranco Bortolotti; G. Elmzoom; L. Cittadini; Ricardo Overman
- Producer: Gianfranco Bortolotti

Cappella singles chronology
"Move On Baby" (1994)	"U & Me" (1994)	"Move It Up" (1994)

Music video
- "U & Me" on YouTube

"U & Me" is a song by Italian Eurodance group Cappella, released on 6 June 1994, by label Media, as the sixth single from their second studio album, U Got 2 Know (1994). Co-written and produced by Gianfranco Bortolotti, it features vocals by Vikki Sheperd, sampled from her song "Love Has Changed My Mind". The single experienced success in many European countries, particularly in Finland, where it peaked at number one for two weeks. It was also a top-10 hit in Italy, the Netherlands, and the UK. The accompanying music video, directed by Juan Kerr, was filmed in London and A-listed on music television channels, such as Germany's VIVA.

== Critical reception ==
In his weekly UK chart commentary, James Masterton wrote, "The new hit is more of the same, Italian dance which will probably find as much favour and annoy as many people as the last one." Pan-European magazine Music & Media noted that "a synth buzzes like a swarm of bees approaching with queen bee singer Kelly ahead of it. The sting of this Euro dance song is of course the catchy melody line and the simple yell." Alan Jones from Music Week gave it a score of four out of five, saying, "Less distinctive than recent Cappella outings, this actually resembles Maxx's 'Get-A-Way', with similar synth scoring and a passable rap. But since that record is top five and Cappella have had three consecutive Top 10 hits, it is not hard to see where this is going." James Hamilton from the Record Mirror Dance Update declared it as a "'you and me forever' girls prodded surging cheesy Italo hip house galloper" in his weekly dance column.

== Chart performance ==
"U & Me" peaked at number one in Finland for two weeks in the beginning of July 1994. It entered the top 10 also in Italy (6), the Netherlands (3), and the UK, as well as on the Eurochart Hot 100, where it entered on 25 June and peaked at number seven on 9 July. In the UK, "U & Me" reached number 10 during its third week on the UK Singles Chart, on 26 June, and it also reached number 10 on the Music Week Dance Singles chart. Additionally, it was a top-20 hit in Austria (15), Belgian Flanders (14), Denmark (15), Germany (14), Sweden (15), and Switzerland (13). Outside Europe, it became a top-10 hit in West Asia, peaking at number six in Israel on 28 June 1994. "U & Me" also charted in Australia, where it peaked at number 76 on the ARIA Singles Chart.

=== Airplay ===
The song topped the European Dance Radio Chart for five weeks, becoming Europe's most played dance song on radio these weeks. It ended up with a position as number five on the EDR year-end chart. "U & Me" also entered the European airplay chart Border Breakers by Music & Media at number 16 on 18 June 1994 due to crossover airplay in West Central-, Northwest-, North- and Northeast-Europe, and peaked at the fifth position on 16 July. In the United Kingdom, the song reached number 38 on the UK Airplay chart on 18 June 1994.

== Music video ==
The music video for "U & Me" was directed by Juan Kerr and filmed in Castle Films Studios in London. Dancer and singer Kelly Overett of Cappella told in an interview in 2022 about the costume she's wearing in the video, "It was really heavy and I didn't mind, it fit the storyboard for the video. I didn't have to wear it for long. All the videos I appeared in were made in London by the same company. They were so creative. We used a lot of the same dancers and they would show up wondering what they would be doing this time." "U & Me" was A-listed on German music television channel VIVA and received active rotation on MTV Europe in July 1994.

== Track listing ==
1. "U & Me" (Masters radio edit) – 3:17
2. "U & Me" (Mars Plastic mix) – 6:36
3. "U & Me" (Housemix) – 6:47
4. "U & Me" (R.A.F. Zone mix) – 5:42
5. "U & Me" (DJ EFX's Disco Latino Mezcla) – 7:32
6. "U & Me" (X-Ray cut) – 6:17
7. "U & Me" (Plus Staples extended) – 7:14
8. "U & Me" (B's San Transdisko Dish) – 7:05

== Credits ==
- Artwork – TFX Image Development BV
- Mastered by – Hay Zeelen
- Producer – Gianfranco Bortolotti
- Written by – C. Piccinelli, Diego Leoni, Gianfranco Bortolotti, G. Elmzoom, L. Cittadini, Ricardo Overman

== Charts ==
=== Weekly charts ===
Chart (1994)	Peak position
Australia (ARIA)	76
Austria (Ö3 Austria Top 40)	15
Belgium (Ultratop 50 Flanders)	14
Denmark (IFPI)	15
Europe (Eurochart Hot 100)	7
Europe (European Dance Radio)	1
Europe (European Hit Radio)	40
Finland (Suomen virallinen lista)	1
France (SNEP)	34
Germany (GfK)	14
Ireland (IRMA)	25
Israel (Israeli Singles Chart)	6
Italy (Musica e dischi)	6
Netherlands (Dutch Top 40)	3
Netherlands (Single Top 100)	4
Scotland (OCC)	4
Sweden (Sverigetopplistan)	15
Switzerland (Schweizer Hitparade)	13
UK Singles (Official Charts)	10
UK Airplay (Music Week)	38
UK Dance (Music Week)	10
UK Club Chart (Music Week)	5
UK Indie (Music Week)	1

=== Year-end charts ===
Chart (1994)	Position
Belgium (Ultratop 50 Flanders)	89
Europe (Eurochart Hot 100)	94
Europe (European Dance Radio)	5
Netherlands (Dutch Top 40)	51
Netherlands (Single Top 100)	26
UK Singles (OCC)	133

== Release history ==
Region	Date	Format(s)	Label(s)	Ref.
United Kingdom	6 June 1994	12-inch vinyl; CD; cassette	Internal Dance	
United Kingdom	13 June 1994	Remix CD	Internal Dance	
Australia	20 June 1994	CD; cassette	Liberation	
