= Mario Più =

Italian professional disc jockey

- Born: Mario Piperno; 26 August 1965 (age 60)
- Origin: Livorno, Italy
- Genres: Trance, Techno
- Years active: 1999-present

Mario Piperno (born on 26 August 1965, in Livorno, Italy), known by his stage name, Mario Più, is an Italian DJ.

His 1999 single, "Communication", also known as "The Communication Song", is notable for being mainly constructed from the interference caused on improperly shielded audio equipment when a GSM mobile telephone rings nearby. The Ringtone sample that can be heard is from the Motorola MicroTAC International Series of GSM Mobile Telephones. In the same year, he also released an album, Vision.

== Discography ==
=== Singles ===
Year	Title	Peak chart positions									Album
Year	Title	AUS	GER	IRE	NED	SCO	UK	CAN Dance Urban	US Club Play	US Dance Sales	Album
1999	"Communication"	—	—	17	11	4	5	14	26	31	Vision
2000	"Arabian Pleasure" (with Mauro Picotto)	36	74	—	—	—	90	32	—	—	Non-album single
2000	"The Vision" (with DJ Arabesque)	—	—	—	—	—	87	—	—	—	Vision
2000	"Techno Harmony (In Love)"	—	62	—	—	—	—	—	—	—	Vision
2001	"The Vision" (with DJ Arabesque) (re-release)	—	100	30	74	13	16	—	—	—	Vision
2002	"Invaders/Away" (with Fabio MC)	—	—	—	—	81	83	—	—	—	Non-album single
2002	"Sensation"	—	—	—	—	85	99	—	—	—	Best of Mario Più
"—" denotes items that did not chart or were not released in that territory.
