= Move On Baby =

1994 single by Cappella

Single by Cappella

from the album U Got 2 Know
- Released: February 1994
- Genre: Eurodance; hi-NRG
- Length: 3:46
- Label: Media
- Songwriters: Gianfranco Bortolotti; Ricardo Overman; Diego Leoni; Lorenzo Carpella; Alessandro Pasinelli; Bruno Guerrini
- Producer: Gianfranco Bortolotti

Cappella singles chronology
"U Got 2 Let the Music" (1993)	"Move On Baby" (1994)	"U & Me" (1994)

Music video
- "Move On Baby" on YouTube

Alternative cover
- CD maxi – Remixes

"Move On Baby" is a song by Italian musical group Cappella, released in February 1994, by Italian label Media, as the fifth single from their second studio album, U Got 2 Know (1994). It was written by Gianfranco Bortolotti, Ricardo Overman, Diego Leoni, Lorenzo Carpella, Alessandro Pasinelli and Bruno Guerrini. However, the vocals were sung by Eileina Dennis and the rap parts were performed by Ricardo Overman. Bortolotti produced the song and it achieved success in many countries, particularly in Finland, Israel, the Netherlands and Switzerland, where it topped the charts. It has received sales certifications in Austria, Belgium, France, Germany and Switzerland. The accompanying music video, directed by B. Smith and Wayne Holloway, received heavy rotation on European music television channels.

== Critical reception ==
John Bush from AllMusic named "Move On Baby" a "continent-wide hi-NRG hit". Upon the release, Larry Flick from Billboard magazine wrote, "After several years of building a loyal following of hi-NRG and Euro-pop fans, Italo-house act Capella appears prepped to take on the rest of the club world. 'Move on Baby' kicks with a perfect blend of foamy froth and underground depth." He named it a "cute and catchy song". Taylor Parkes from Melody Maker described it as "exotic", "refreshingly un-English" and "glorious". He also remarked its "face-punching beats".

Andy Beevers from Music Week gave the song a top score of five out of five and named it Pick of the Week in the category of Dance, noting that it "relies heavily on an anthemic synth riff that is very similar to those used on the last two Cappella hits. The cheesy rap and screaming vocals provide the distinguishing features. Zero ponts for originality, but maximum marks for chart potential." James Hamilton from the Record Mirror Dance Update named it a "Culture Beat-type typical cheesy Italo pop raver" in his weekly dance colum. Mark Sutherland from Smash Hits was less enthusiastic and gave it one out of five, saying, "After 'U Got 2 Know' and 'U Got 2 Let the Music', the Caps finally write a song that doesn't start with the words "U Got 2". But what they've gained in grammar they've lost in catchiness."

== Chart performance ==
"Move On Baby" peaked at number one on the singles charts in Finland (1 week), the Netherlands (3 weeks) and Switzerland (3 weeks). In Europe, it entered the top 10 also in Austria, Belgium, Germany, Ireland, Italy, Norway, Spain, Sweden and the United Kingdom. In Cappella's native Italy, the single peaked at number two on the Musica e dischi chart, behind "The Rhythm of the Night" by Corona. In the UK, it peaked at number seven during its first week on the UK Singles Chart, on 13 February. It spent eight weeks inside the UK top 100.

On the Eurochart Hot 100, "Move On Baby" peaked at number one on 26 March, after five weeks on the chart. Additionally, it was a top-20 hit in Denmark and Iceland, and a top-30 hit in France. Outside Europe, the single peaked at number one in Israel, reaching the top position in its second week on the chart, on 1 March. It also peaked at numbers seven and 24 on the US Billboard Hot Dance Club Play chart and the Canadian RPM Dance/Urban chart, and number 58 on the ARIA singles chart in Australia. "Move On Baby" was awarded with a gold record in Austria, Belgium, France, Germany (250 000) and Switzerland.

=== Airplay ===
"Move On Baby" entered the European airplay chart Border Breakers by Music & Media at number 14 on 26 February 1994 due to crossover airplay in West Central-, Northwest- and North-Europe, and peaked at number five on 12 March. It also topped the European Dance Radio Chart in April 1994, becoming the most-played dance song on European radio stations that week. In the United Kingdom, "Move On Baby" reached number 15 on the UK Airplay chart in the end of March 1994.

== Music video ==
A music video was produced to promote the single, directed by B. Smith and Wayne Holloway and filmed in the UK. It features group members Kelly Overett and Rodney Bishop performing in front of a pink backdrop with dancers wearing masks and tied to ropes. The video received heavy rotation on MTV Europe in March 1994 and was A-listed on Germany music television channel VIVA same month. Four months later, it was A-listed on France's MCM. Smith and Holloway had previously directed the video for the group's 1993 single "U Got 2 Let the Music".

== Impact and legacy ==
British DJ duo Sharp Boyz named the Armand van Helden remix of "Move On Baby" as one of their favourites in 1996. George Mitchell said, "This rates as one of his best. He's a big inspiration to us. He came with a hard sound, heartbeat kick drum, and took on projects everyone else would say no to and transformed them, as he did with this remix." In their "The ABC in Eurodance" in 2016, Finnish broadcaster Yle noted, "One of the 90's really big ones in Eurodance! The beautiful Italian dance sound was captivating. Works just as well as a mood enhancer even in 2016!"

== Track listings ==
- 7-inch single – Germany
1. "Move On Baby" (Definitive Edit) – 3:39
2. "Move On Baby" (Plus Staples Mix) – 3:30
- 12-inch maxi – Germany
1. "Move On Baby" (House Mix) – 5:30
2. "Move On Baby" (Original Mix) – 5:12
3. "Move On Baby" (Plus Staples Mix) – 6:10
4. "Move On Baby" (Mars Plastic Mix) – 5:30
- 12-inch maxi – UK
1. "Move On Baby" (Razor Mix) – 5:28
2. "Move On Baby" (House Mix) – 5:29
3. "Move On Baby" (Original Mix) – 5:14
4. "Move On Baby" (Plus Staples Mix) – 6:10
5. "Move On Baby" (Ralf And Professor Mix) – 8:37
- 12-inch maxi – US
1. "Move On Baby" (F-Mix) – 5:28
2. "Move On Baby" (Tribalism Mix) – 6:31
3. "Move On Baby" (Armand's Peakin' Mix) – 9:10
4. "Move On Baby" (Extended Remix Vocal) – 5:19
- 12-inch maxi 1 – Italy (Yellow disc)
1. "Move On Baby" (XClub + XDub Mix) – 12:10
2. "Move On Baby" (Ralf & DJ Professor Mix) – 8:45
- 12-inch maxi 2 – Italy (Blue disc)
1. "Move On Baby" (KM 1972 Mix) – 5:58
2. "Move On Baby" (Original Mix) – 5:12
3. "Move On Baby" (Extended Mix) – 5:45
4. "Move On Baby" (Sound of Love) – 6:35
- 12-inch maxi 3 – Italy (Green disc)
1. "Move On Baby" (Tribalism Mix) – 6:30
2. "Move On Baby" (Plus Staples Mix) – 6:10
3. "Move On Baby" (DJ Pierre Trance Mix) – 8:20
- 12-inch maxi 4 – Italy (Black disc)
1. "Move On Baby" (Overture & R.A.F. Zone Mix) – 11:35
2. "Move On Baby" (Extended Mix) – 5:45
3. "Move On Baby" (House Mix) – 5:30
4. "Move On Baby" (KM 1972 Mix) – 5:58
5. "Move On Baby" (Tribalism Mix) – 6:30
- 12-inch maxi 5 – Italy (Red disc)
1. "Move On Baby" (Mars Plastic Mix) – 5:30
2. "Move On Baby" (House Mix) – 5:30
3. "Move On Baby" (Overture + R.A.F. Zone Mix) – 11:35
- 12-inch maxi – Finland
1. "Move On Baby" (KDC – Radio Edit) (Mars Plastic Mix) – 3:46
2. "Move On Baby" (Original) – 3:37
3. "Move On Baby" (House Mix) – 5:30
4. "Move On Baby" (KM. 1972 Mix) – 5:58
- CD single – Switzerland
1. "Move On Baby" (Mars Plastic Edit) – 3:53
2. "Move On Baby" (Original Mix) – 5:12
- CD maxi – Netherlands
1. "Move On Baby" (Mars Plastic Edit) – 3:25
2. "Move On Baby" (Mars Plastic Mix) – 5:30
3. "Move On Baby" (House Mix) – 5:30
4. "Move On Baby" (Overture & RAF Zone Mix) – 11:35
5. "Move On Baby" (KM 1972 Mix) – 5:58
6. "Move On Baby" (Original Mix) – 5:12
7. "Move On Baby" (Extended Mix) – 5:45
8. "Move On Baby" (Sound Of Love Mix) – 6:35
9. "Move On Baby" (Tribalism Mix) – 6:30
10. "Move On Baby" (Plus Staples Mix) – 6:10
11. "Move On Baby" (DJ Pierre Trance Mix) – 8:20
12. "Move On Baby" (Ralf & Professor Mix) – 6:59
- CD maxi – Germany, UK
1. "Move On Baby" (Definitive Edit) – 3:39
2. "Move On Baby" (Razor Mix) – 5:27
3. "Move On Baby" (House Mix) – 5:30
4. "Move On Baby" (Ralf And Professor Mix) – 8:45
5. "Move On Baby" (Plus Staples Mix) – 6:10
6. "Move On Baby" (Original Mix) – 5:12
7. "Move On Baby" (Extended Mix) – 5:45
- CD maxi – US
1. "Move On Baby" (Extended Remix Vocal) – 5:19
2. "Move On Baby" (F-Mix) – 5:25
3. "Move On Baby" (Tribalism Mix) – 6:31
4. "Move On Baby" (Definitive Edit) – 3:38
5. "Move On Baby" (Razor Edit) – 3:38
- CD maxi – Finland
1. "Move On Baby" (Radio Edit (Mars Plastic Mix)) – 3:46
2. "Move On Baby" (Original Mix) – 3:37
3. "Move On Baby" (House Mix) – 5:30
4. "Move On Baby" (KM.1972 Mix) – 5:58
- CD maxi – Remixes – Germany
1. "Move On Baby" (Overture + R.A.F. Zone Mix) – 11:35
2. "Move On Baby" (Sound Of Love) – 6:35
3. "Move On Baby" (KM 1972 Mix) – 5:58
4. "Move On Baby" (DJ Pierre Trance Mix) – 8:20
- Cassette – UK
1. "Move On Baby" (Definitive Edit)
2. "Move On Baby" (Razor Mix)
3. "Move On Baby" (Original Mix)
4. "Move On Baby" (Definitive Edit)
5. "Move On Baby" (Razor Mix)
6. "Move On Baby" (Original Mix)

== Charts ==
=== Weekly charts ===
Chart (1994)	Peak position
Australia (ARIA)	58
Austria (Ö3 Austria Top 40)	3
Belgium (Ultratop 50 Flanders)	7
Belgium (VRT Top 30 Flanders)	3
Canada Dance/Urban (RPM)	24
Denmark (IFPI)	14
Europe (Eurochart Hot 100)	1
Europe (European Dance Radio)	1
Europe (European Hit Radio)	27
Finland (Suomen virallinen lista)	1
France (SNEP)	30
Germany (GfK)	4
Iceland (Íslenski Listinn Topp 40)	16
Ireland (IRMA)	9
Israel (Israeli Singles Chart)	1
Italy (Musica e dischi)	2
Netherlands (Dutch Top 40)	1
Netherlands (Single Top 100)	1
Norway (VG-lista)	8
Scottish Singles Sales (Official Charts)	5
Spain (AFYVE)	7
Sweden (Sverigetopplistan)	9
Switzerland (Schweizer Hitparade)	1
UK Singles (OCC)	7
UK Airplay (Music Week)	15
UK Dance (Music Week)	4
UK Club Chart (Music Week)	7
UK Indie (Music Week)	1
US Dance Club Play (Billboard)	7
US Maxi-Singles Sales (Billboard)	31

=== Year-end charts ===
Chart (1994)	Position
Belgium (Ultratop 50 Flanders)	39
Europe (Eurochart Hot 100)	19
Europe (European Dance Radio)	16
Germany (Media Control)	31
Netherlands (Dutch Top 40)	18
Netherlands (Single Top 100)	7
Sweden (Topplistan)	60
Switzerland (Schweizer Hitparade)	11
UK Singles (OCC)	84
UK Club Chart (Music Week)	98

== Certifications ==
Region	Certification	Certified units/sales
Germany (BVMI)	Gold	250,000^{^}
^{^} Shipments figures based on certification alone.

== Release history ==
Region	Date	Format(s)	Label(s)	Ref.
United Kingdom	February 1994	7-inch vinyl; 12-inch vinyl; CD; cassette	Internal Dance	
Germany	10 February 1994	CD	ZYX Music	
Australia	21 March 1994	CD; cassette	Liberation	
Japan	25 May 1994	Mini-CD	Cutting Edge	
