= Lizzy Mack =

- Birth name: Lizzy Mack
- Origin: United Kingdom
- Genres: Eurodance, electronic
- Years active: 1990s
- Labels: MCA Records

Lizzy Mack is a vocalist from the United Kingdom. She had a No. 49 hit as the featured artist on the Fits of Gloom cover of "The Power of Love" and a No. 52 hit with her version of the Yazoo song "Don't Go".
