= Phil Drummond =

British electronic music producer

- Born: Philip Phillips
- Origin: London, England
- Genres: Electronica, house
- Occupation: Music producer
- Instruments: Turntables, keyboards, programming

Phil Drummond (born Philip Phillips) is a British electronic music producer best known for his work with the band Xpansions and singer and actress Sally Ann Marsh and their song "Move Your Body."

== Early life and education ==
Drummond was brought up in a working-class family in the London borough of Enfield. He attended Bullsmoor Secondary school (now Lea Valley High School) until 1990. His professional career in electronic music started when he was still in school.

== Career ==
In the 1990s, Drummond, nicknamed Pip, had four UK top 40 singles as Xpansions and Marradonna alongside Richie Malone while signed to Arista Records and Pete Waterman Entertainment,. He appeared on the BBC One TV show Top of the Pops. Resident Advisor magazine described him as a "pioneer of dance music. Phil Drummond was one half of the dance music group Xpansions, who along with the Prodigy, and The Shamen, brought dance music to the mainstream in the late '80s, early '90s."

He has been the DJ for many fashion houses and award ceremonies such as The Brit Awards for ITV, MTV and after-show/end of tour parties for acts including Robbie Williams, Jamiroquai and The Rolling Stones.

Drummond was included, alongside 100 of the world's top DJs, in the book DJ's by Lopez: Portrait Photography of International DJ's, released in 2003 by Artist's and Photographers' Press Ltd.

In September 2009, Drummond joined Dominic Madden's Kingdom Entertainment group. KEG acquired The Dex Nightclub, voted Mixmag's best club of the Year 2008. Kingdom Group also owns the online entertainment ticket agency, Bookings First, which launched in March 2009.
