= Mauro Picotto =

Italian DJ and remixer (born 1966)

- Also known as: D.J. Pic 8, M-Peak-8, Megamind, MP8, R.A.F. By Picotto, CRW
- Born: Mauro Picotto; 25 December 1966 (age 59); Cavour, Italy
- Genres: Trance, EDM
- Years active: 1989–present
- Labels: Media (until 2002), Bakerloo SRL, Alchemy
- Website: alchemyfest.it

Mauro Picotto (born 25 December 1966) is an Italian electronic music producer and DJ, and previously a member of the Italian Euro house group "R.A.F.". He became well known as a solo artist with songs including "Komodo (Save a Soul)", "Pulsar", "Iguana", and "Lizard". He has collaborated with other electronica/trance musicians such as Tiësto and Mario Più.

He now promotes his own club night, Meganite (named after an early 21st-century track of his), which has run for consecutive years annually since 2004 at Privilege Ibiza. He now produces under his own record label, Bakerloo.

== Biography ==
Born in the Italian town of Cavour, near Turin, Picotto was raised in a family of stonemasons and dancers. His father ran a mason's yard called CRW, a name Mauro would later use as a pseudonym for his trance side-project.

Picotto longed to start making his own productions, but felt that to be successful he must first become a disc jockey (DJ). After winning the Walky Cup competition on national TV, an event for the top Disco Mix Club DJs in Italy, he met with Daniele Davoli, who was there to promote his Black Box single "Ride on Time", and this led Picotto towards record producing. His first track, "We Gonna Get", produced under the name R.A.F., became a top 20 hit single across much of Europe.

Between 1992 and 1996, R.A.F. would release a number of dance hits, as well as achieving a top 40 UK Singles Chart hit with "We've Got to Live Together". The song was co-written by Picotto and a number of other producers at Media Studios, including Media label boss Gianfranco Bortolotti.

Picotto and Bortolotti would see greater success a couple of years later together when another of their co-writes, "Light My Fire", became a big Eurodance hit when remixed by Bortolotti's Cappella, with the song (once licensed to Pete Waterman's PWL Records) becoming a number 7 hit in the United Kingdom in the spring of 1994. As well as Club House, Picotto had remix and co-writing credits on many of Bortolotti's other Eurodance projects such as "Cappella" (best known for hits like "U Got 2 Let the Music" and "Move on Baby") and the 49ers.

In 1996, Bortolotti decided to make Picotto a partner in Media Records alongside him, while a track released under Picotto's own name, "Bakerloo Symphony", ended up being a number one in Italy for eight weeks.

1998 saw the release of the Gatecrasher anthem "Lizard (Gonna Get You)". The track ended up being a top 30 hit on the UK Singles Chart, and was followed by two further instalments in the reptilian trilogy: "Iguana" (#39) and "Komodo (Save a Soul)", which would give Picotto the highest UK chart position of his solo career – number 13. This would see him make his only solo performance on BBC Television's Top of the Pops. Picotto was the first DJ to mix live on the show.

Later tracks he was involved in also made an impact on the UK chart. "I Feel Love" – released under the pseudonym CRW – reached number 15 in 2000, whilst "Communication (Somebody Answer the Phone)" – which he produced alongside Mario Più – reached the UK top 5 at the end of 1999.

His remix of "On the Beach" by York also helped to propel that song into the UK top 5 in spring 2000, when it was selected by the record company Manifesto to be used as the official radio edit. Two solo albums, The Double Album (2000) and The Others (2002) followed, as well as remixes and productions for Freddie Mercury, Jimmy Somerville, the Pet Shop Boys and U2. Upon leaving Media Records in 2002, Picotto formed Bakerloo Music, as well as the new label Alchemy, releasing several club tracks, including "New Time New Place" and the Alchemy EP. That same year, he launched his Meganite party at the Miami Winter Music Conference.

On 7 May 2005, Picotto headlined the dance stage at BBC Radio 1's Big Weekend in Sunderland, in front of thousands of people.

Picotto released several Meganite Ibiza albums on the new label, Big in Ibiza. His Meganite party is held every Wednesday at Ibiza's Privilege club.

In May 2017, he released the album A Call in the Club.

== Discography ==
=== Albums ===
- BXR Superclub Compilation Volume 1 (with Mario Più Feat. Zicky – Franchino) (1999)
- Tranceformer 2000 (with Lange) (1999)
- Pressure (feat. Megamind & Mario Più & R.A.F.) (1999)
- The Album (2000)
- Make Yourself Heard @ Homelands (2000)
- The Double Album (2000)
- BXR Superclub Compilation Volume 2 (with Mario Più Feat. Zicky & Franchino) (2000)
- The Sound of BXR (2000)
- The Lizard Man (2000)
- VIP Lounge (2001)
- In the Mix – Metamorphose (2001)
- The Triple Album (Special Edition) (2001)
- Maximal.FM Compilation Vol. 2 (2001)
- Selected Works / In the Mix (2001)
- Rush Hour (2001)
- Metamorphose & Awesome!!! (2002)
- The Others (2002)
- Live in Ibiza – Essential Selection (2002)
- Italian Techno Master (2002)
- Meganite Compilation (2004)
- Superclub (2006)
- Meganite Compilation Volume 2 (2006)
- Meganite³ (2007)
- Now & Then (2007)
- Meganite Ibiza 2007 (2007)
- Meganite – Privilege, Ibiza (2008)
- Meganite (2009)
- Best of Mauro Picotto (2010)
- 2010 (2010)
- Raveline Mix Sessions 036 (2011)
- Twentyeleven (Unmixed & Mixed) (2011)
- A Call in the Club (2017)
- From the 80's Til Now (2023)

=== Singles ===
Year	Title	Peak chart positions										Certifications	Album
Year	Title	ITA	AUT	BEL	FRA	GER	IRE	NED	SPA	SWI	UK	Certifications	Album
1999	"Lizard (Gonna Get You)"	—	—	—	—	—	—	—	—	—	27		The Album
1999	"Iguana"	—	—	—	—	37	—	—	—	97	87		The Album
1999	"Lizard" (remix)	—	—	—	—	—	—	—	—	—	33		The Album
2000	"Pulsar"	—	—	—	—	—	—	—	—	—	85		The Album
2000	"Arabian Pleasure" (with Mario Più)	—	—	—	—	74	—	—	—	—	90		Non-album single
2000	"Pegasus"	—	—	—	—	—	—	—	—	—	92		The Album
2000	"Iguana" (re-release)	—	—	—	96	—	24	—	—	—	33		The Album
2000	"Komodo"	17	4	—	60	6	—	—	—	4	80	GER: Gold	The Album
2000	"Baguette/Ultimahora Ibiza"	—	—	—	—	—	—	—	—	—	85		The Album
2001	"Komodo (Save a Soul)"	—	71	15	—	—	2	11	—	—	13		The Album
2001	"Bug"	—	—	—	—	—	—	—	—	—	96		The Album
2001	"Like This Like That"	—	34	—	—	55	18	35	13	73	21		The Album
2001	"Verdi"	—	—	—	—	—	—	—	—	—	74		The Others
2001	"Proximus" (with Adiemus)	30	19	43	—	18	—	23	16	32	—		Non-album single
2002	"Pulsar 2002"	—	—	—	—	—	16	—	—	—	35		The Others
2002	"Back to Cali"	—	—	—	—	75	—	—	—	—	42		The Others
2003	Alchemist EP	—	—	—	—	—	—	—	—	—	95		Non-album singles
2003	"Funkytech / Funkytime" (with Fergie)	—	—	—	—	—	—	—	—	—	—		Non-album singles
2005	"Lizard" (re-release)	—	—	—	—	—	—	—	—	—	94		The Album
2021	"Elisir of Love" (with AYKO)	—	—	—	—	—	—	—	—	—	—		Non-album single
"—" denotes items that did not chart or were not released in that territory.

== Awards and nominations ==
- German Dance Awards: Best International DJ, Best Producer, Best Radio Hit
- Danish Dance Awards: Best International DJ
- Ericsson Swiss Dance Awards: Best International DJ
- BBm Magazine Irish Dance Awards: Best International DJ
- Deejay Magazine Spanish Dance Awards Best International DJ
- TMF Dutch Dance Awards: Best International DJ
- RTÉ 2fm Irish Dance Music Awards: Best International DJ
- DJ Awards 2005 Ibiza: Winner
- Voted in the Top 100 DJs in TheDJList.com (US) and DJ Mag (UK)
