= U Got 2 Let the Music =

1993 single by Cappella

Single by Cappella

from the album U Got 2 Know
- Released: 20 September 1993
- Genre: Hi-NRG; Eurobeat; Eurodance
- Length: 3:32 (radio version); 5:46 (Mars Plastic mix)
- Label: Media
- Songwriters: Gianfranco Bortolotti; Pierangelo Feroldi; Antonio Puntillo; Alessandro Neri; Marco Baroni; Stefano Zucchini; Roberto Arduini
- Producer: Gianfranco Bortolotti

Cappella singles chronology
"U Got 2 Know" (1993)	"U Got 2 Let the Music" (1993)	"Move On Baby" (1994)

Music video
- "U Got 2 Let the Music" on YouTube

"U Got 2 Let the Music" is a song by Italian Eurodance group Cappella, released in September 1993 as the fourth single from their second studio album, U Got 2 Know (1994). The track samples "Sounds Like a Melody" by German musical group Alphaville and charted in various countries around the world, including the UK, where it reached number two on the UK Singles Chart, becoming the 36th-best-selling single of 1993 in the UK. The single was also the first time in recent history that an Italian record made it on the UK chart, before succeeding in its home territory. In Austria, Finland and Switzerland, it peaked at number one. Its accompanying music video was filmed in London and received heavy rotation on MTV Europe in January 1994. "U Got 2 Let the Music" was re-released in 1998, 2004 and 2006, in remixed versions.

== Background ==
Cappella started as a studio project with Italian producer and manager Gianfranco Bortolotti and his record company Media Record's team of DJs and producers ganging together, striving for the perfect commercial dance formula. The band had some minor hits in the late 1980s and early '90s with singles like "Bauhaus (Push the Beat)" (1987), "Helyom Halib" (1989) and "Take Me Away" (1992). After Cappella became progressively more commercial and received sustained success, Bortolotti chose British dancer Kelly Overett and American rapper Rodney Bishop as a regular public face of the group.

"U Got 2 Let the Music" is a reworking of "Let the Music", a 1992 song by Legend, another project of Bortolotti, of which former Cappella member Diego Leoni was also part of. "U Got 2 Let the Music" would be the first release with Overett and Bishop. In a 1993 interview with Music & Media, Bortolotti said, "We have given Capella a new image with Anglo-Italian Kelly and American Rodney as the group's public image. Capella's sound is also less techno and more pop-oriented now." The track samples the 1984 Alphaville song "Sounds Like a Melody", but none of its songwriters were given writing credits on U Got 2 Know.

== Critical reception ==
John Bush from AllMusic described "U Got 2 Let the Music" as a "continent-wide hi-NRG hit". The Stud Brothers of Melody Maker stated that following in the footsteps of "No Limit" and "Mr. Vain", "Cappella lob out another foul, insidious slice of Eurobeat masquerading as, techno (as in Techno! Techno! Techno!)" They concluded that "this has all the ingredients to go straight to Number One", noting its "soul samples", "lyric three words longer than the title", "a 1,000 mph Jean Michel Jarre melody", "and behind it all, a shady Continental entrepreneur". Melody Maker editor Peter Paphides said "it's basically a speeded-up Kraftwerk song with Kelly rasping all over it". Pan-European magazine Music & Media wrote, "Harold Faltermeyer meets the Italo house scene on a melody line not unlike "Let's All Chant" by the Michael Zager Band and ends up at the top of the UK dance chart." Dario Usuelli, PD at EHR Radio Deejay Network/Milan commented, "It is a fast danceable pop song without pretention and has a good strong dance rhythm for the clubs." James Hamilton from Music Week's RM Dance Update called it a "typical breezy synth buzzed chanting italo techno-pop scamperer". Another RM editor, Tim Jeffery, viewed it as a "typically big, bold and brash Euro stomper that's pretty much in the same vein as their last hit single", stating that "this is basically in-yer-face pop techno."

== Chart performance ==
In Europe, "U Got 2 Let the Music" peaked at number one in Austria , Finland, and Switzerland, as well as reaching number two in the United Kingdom. In Finland, the single debuted at number one on 13 November 1993 and stayed there for two weeks. In the United Kingdom, it peaked during its second week on the UK Singles Chart, on 24 October. "U Got 2 Let the Music" was the 36th-best-selling single of 1993 in the UK. It also peaked at number one on the Music Week Dance Singles chart and number six on the Record Mirror Club Chart. In other European countries, it entered the top 10 in Belgium, Denmark, Germany, Ireland, Italy, the Netherlands, and Norway.

The single was the first time in recent history that an Italian record appeared on the UK chart, before succeeding in its home territory. In Germany, it reached number three for three weeks and stayed within the German Singles Chart for a total of 25 weeks. On the Eurochart Hot 100, the single peaked at number four on 15 January 1994. It debuted at number 46 in October 1993, after charting in Ireland and the UK. Additionally, "U Got 2 Let the Music" was a top-20 hit in France, Iceland and Sweden. Outside Europe, it became a successful top-3 hit in Israel, peaking at number three on 9 November 1993. It also charted in Australia, where it peaked at only number 169 on the ARIA Singles Chart. "U Got 2 Let the Music" earned a gold record in Austria, a silver record in the UK, and a platinum record in Germany.

== Airplay ==
"U Got 2 Let the Music" rolled out at number 17 when the first European airplay chart Border Breakers by Music & Media was compiled on 30 October 1993 due to crossover airplay in Central- and Northwest-Europe. It peaked at number three on 11 December. In the same period, it also peaked at number three on the European Dance Radio Chart, behind "Got to Get It" by Culture Beat and "Feels Like Heaven" by Urban Cookie Collective. In the UK, the song reached number 22 on the UK Airplay chart by Music Week in the beginning of November 1993.

== Track listings ==
- CD single – France
1. "U Got 2 Let the Music" (R.A.F. Zone mix) (4:00)
2. "U Got 2 Let the Music" (Pagany KM 1972 mix) (5:20)
- CD maxi – Germany
1. "U Got 2 Let the Music" (radio version) (3:32)
2. "U Got 2 Let the Music" (Mars Plastic mix) (5:46)
3. "U Got 2 Let the Music" (Plus Staples mix) (5:15)
4. "U Got 2 Let the Music" (Pagany KM 1972 mix) (5:24)
5. "U Got 2 Let the Music" (D.J. Pierre mix) (5:31)
- CD maxi – Italy, Finland
1. "U Got 2 Let the Music" (R.A.F. Zone mix) (5:33)
2. "U Got 2 Let the Music" (Pagany Tribalism mix) (5:38)
3. "U Got 2 Let the Music" (Pagany KM 1972 mix) (5:20)
4. "U Got 2 Let the Music" (Mars Plastic mix) (6:00)
- CD maxi – UK, Italy
1. "U Got 2 Let the Music" (Brescia edit) (3:42)
2. "U Got 2 Let the Music" (Pagany KM 1972 mix) (5:27)
3. "U Got 2 Let the Music" (Plus Staples mix) (5:17)
4. "U Got 2 Let the Music" (D.J. Professor Trans X Cut) (11:40)
5. "U Got 2 Let the Music" (D.J. Pierre mix) (5:35)
6. "U Got 2 Let the Music" (Mars Plastic mix) (5:46)
- CD maxi – Netherlands
1. "U Got 2 Let the Music" (DJ Pierre edit) (3:10)
2. "U Got 2 Let the Music" (Brescia edit) (3:42)
3. "U Got 2 Let the Music" (Pagany KM 1972 mix) (5:27)
4. "U Got 2 Let the Music" (Plus Staples mix) (5:17)
5. "U Got 2 Let the Music" (D.J. Professor Trans X Cut) (11:40)
6. "U Got 2 Let the Music" (D.J. Pierre mix) (5:35)
7. "U Got 2 Let the Music" (Mars Plastic mix) (5:46)
- CD maxi – Australia
1. "U Got 2 Let the Music" (R.A.F. Zone mix) (5:33)
2. "U Got 2 Let the Music" (Pagany Tribalism mix) (5:38)
3. "U Got 2 Let the Music" (Pagany KM 1972 mix) (5:20)
4. "U Got 2 Let the Music" (Mars Plastic mix) (6:00)
5. "U Got 2 Let the Music" (D.J. Professor Trans X Cut) (11:30)
6. "U Got 2 Let the Music" (D.J. Pierre Trance mix) (6:00)
7. "U Got 2 Let the Music" (Plus Staples mix) (5:20)
8. "U Got 2 Let the Music" (D.J. Pierre mix) (6:00)
- 12-inch maxi – Italy, France, Finland
1. "U Got 2 Let the Music" (R.A.F. Zone mix) (5:33)
2. "U Got 2 Let the Music" (Pagany Tribalism mix) (5:38)
3. "U Got 2 Let the Music" (Pagany KM 1972 mix) (5:20)
4. "U Got 2 Let the Music" (Mars Plastic mix) (6:00)
- 12-inch maxi – Germany
1. "U Got 2 Let the Music" (Mars Plastic mix) (5:46)
2. "U Got 2 Let the Music" (Plus Staples mix) (5:15)
3. "U Got 2 Let the Music" (Pagany KM 1972 mix) (5:24)
4. "U Got 2 Let the Music" (D.J. Pierre mix) (5:31)
- 12-inch maxi – UK
1. "U Got 2 Let the Music" (Pagany KM 1972 mix)
2. "U Got 2 Let the Music" (Plus Staples mix)
3. "U Got 2 Let the Music" (DJ Pierre Trance mix)
4. "U Got 2 Let the Music" (DJ Professor Trans X Cut)
5. "U Got 2 Let the Music" (DJ Pierre mix)
- 12-inch maxi – Spain
1. "U Got 2 Let the Music" (R.A.F. Zone mix) (5:33)
2. "U Got 2 Let the Music" (Pagany Tribalism mix) (5:38)
3. "U Got 2 Let the Music" (Mars Plastic mix) (6:00)
4. "U Got 2 Let the Music" (D.J. Pierre mix) (6:00)
- 12-inch maxi – Greece
1. "U Got 2 Let the Music" (radio version) (3:32)
2. "U Got 2 Let the Music" (Mars Plastic mix) (5:46)
- 7-inch single – UK
1. "U Got 2 Let the Music" (Brescia edit) (3:42)
2. "U Got 2 Let the Music" (Pagany KM 1972 mix) (5:27)
3. "U Got 2 Let the Music" (Plus Staples mix) (5:17)
- Cassette – UK
1. "U Got 2 Let the Music" (Brescia edit)
2. "U Got 2 Let the Music" (Pagany KM 1972 mix)
3. "U Got 2 Let the Music" (Plus Staples mix)
4. "U Got 2 Let the Music" (Brescia edit)
5. "U Got 2 Let the Music" (Pagany KM 1972 mix)
6. "U Got 2 Let the Music" (Plus Staples mix)

== Charts ==
=== Weekly charts ===
Chart (1993–1994)	Peak position
Australia (ARIA)	169
Austria (Ö3 Austria Top 40)	1
Belgium (Ultratop 50 Flanders)	6
Denmark (IFPI)	8
Europe (Eurochart Hot 100)	4
Europe (European Dance Radio)	3
Finland (Suomen virallinen lista)	1
France (SNEP)	12
Germany (GfK)	3
Iceland (Íslenski Listinn Topp 40)	20
Ireland (IRMA)	6
Israel (Israeli Singles Chart)	3
Italy (Musica e dischi)	9
Netherlands (Dutch Top 40)	13
Netherlands (Single Top 100)	9
Norway (VG-lista)	4
Sweden (Sverigetopplistan)	14
Switzerland (Schweizer Hitparade)	1
UK Singles (Official Charts)	2
UK Airplay (Music Week)	22
UK Dance (Music Week)	1
UK Club Chart (Music Week)	6
UK Indie (Music Week)	1

=== Year-end charts ===
Chart (1993)	Position
Europe (Eurochart Hot 100)	80
Israel (Israeli Singles Chart)	45
Netherlands (Dutch Top 40)	175
Sweden (Topplistan)	88
UK Singles (OCC)	37

Chart (1994)	Position
Austria (Ö3 Austria Top 40)	8
Belgium (Ultratop 50 Flanders)	65
Europe (Eurochart Hot 100)	23
Germany (Media Control)	24
Netherlands (Dutch Top 40)	134
Netherlands (Single Top 100)	67
Switzerland (Schweizer Hitparade)	20

=== Decade-end charts ===
Chart (1990–1999)	Rank
Austria (Ö3 Austria Top 40)	99

== Certifications and sales ==
Region	Certification	Certified units/sales
Austria (IFPI Austria)	Gold	25,000^{*}
Germany (BVMI)	Platinum	500,000^{^}
United Kingdom (BPI)	Silver	200,000^{^}
^{*} Sales figures based on certification alone.^{^} Shipments figures based on certification alone.

== Release history ==
Region	Date	Format(s)	Label(s)	Ref.
Germany	20 September 1993	CD	ZYX Music	
Australia	10 January 1994	CD	MDS Dance	

== See also ==
- List of number-one hits of 1994 (Austria)
- List of number-one singles of the 1990s (Switzerland)
