= Xaviera Gold =

American singer

- Origin: Chicago, Illinois
- Genres: Dance
- Occupations: DJ, remixer
- Years active: 1987–2008

Xaviera Gold is a female African American dance music singer who is a former DJ and mixer on Chicago's WBMX-FM. In 1987, she had a hit with Ralphi Rosario on the song "You Used to Hold Me" under the name Xavier Gold (without the 'a' at the end). With Masters At Work, she went to #1 on the Hot Dance Music/Club Play chart in 1993 with "Gonna Get Back to You". She had an additional Top 10 on the dance chart in 1994 as the featured vocalist on Ralphi Rosario's track "You Used to Hold Me '94". The song "Good Luv" followed later that year and was a Top 30 dance hit.

== Discography ==
=== Singles & EPs ===
- "You Used to Hold Me" (1987)
- "Gonna Get Back to You" (1992)
- You Used to Hold Me '94 (1994)
- Good Luv (1995)
- "Bad Girls" (1995)
- Walkin' Out Da Door (2007)
- Another Day (2008)

== See also ==
- List of number-one dance hits (United States)
- List of artists who reached number one on the US Dance chart
