= Cappella (band) =

Italian musical group

- Origin: Brescia, Italy
- Genres: Eurodance
- Years active: 1987–1998, 2004, 2013–present
- Labels: Do It Yourself, Media, Zyx, Radikal, Universal
- Members: Vikki Waters; Rikki Dallas; Andy Critchlow; Gianfranco Bortolotti
- Past members: Lis Birks; Marcus Birks; Rodney Bishop; Massimo Castrezzati; Eileina Dennis; Katherine Ellis; Ettore Foresti; Andrew Gidney; Allison Jordan; Stefano Lanzini; Diego Leoni; Steve Lewis; Jay McCurdy; Patrick Osbourne; Ricardo Overman; Kelly Overett; Tiziano Pagani; Alessandro Pasinelli; Mauro Picotto; Jackie Rawe; Pieradis Rossini; Anna Ross

Cappella is an Italian Eurodance music group formed in 1987 by producer Gianfranco Bortolotti. The act went through a number of line-up changes over the years but was most successful in the early 1990s. Their biggest hit was "U Got 2 Let the Music", which reached No. 2 on the UK Singles Chart in 1993.

== History ==
=== 1987-1991: Beginnings and minor success ===
The name Cappella was first used in 1987. In the beginning, they were a hi-NRG-influenced house act with producer Gianfranco Bortolotti of Media Records leading the group, with significant contributions from fellow producers Stefano Lanzini, Diego Leoni and Pieradis Rossini. In 1988, the act debuted on the UK Singles Chart with the song "Bauhaus (Push the Beat)", and the following year with "Helyom Halib" which peaked at number 11. At the time, the act was fronted by model Ettore Foresti, who served as the face of the group, but did not perform any of the vocals.

Three years later, Cappella scored another UK top 30 hit with "Take Me Away", which sampled Loleatta Holloway's "Love Sensation" – the same track that had been sampled on the number 1 hit "Ride on Time" by fellow Italian house act Black Box in 1989.

=== 1992-1995: U Got 2 Know and worldwide success ===
It was not until 1992 when Cappella really began to gain momentum. "U Got 2 Know" was based on the distinctive riff of Siouxsie and the Banshees' "Happy House". Vocalist Anna Ross and rapper MC Fixx It (Ricardo Overman) were chosen by Bortolotti for live performances. The song reached number 6 in the UK. Afterwards, two permanent members from England were drafted in to front the act: rapper Rodney Bishop from London and ex-SL2 dancer Kelly Overett from Ipswich. "U Got 2 Let the Music" (which sampled Alphaville's "Sounds Like a Melody") was released in October 1993 and climbed to number 2 on the UK Singles Chart, held off from the top spot only by Meat Loaf's "I'd Do Anything for Love (But I Won't Do That)". "U Got 2 Know" would later be remade and updated by Tomcraft in 2013.

Further hits followed: "Move On Baby" reached number 7 in February 1994, "U & Me" peaked at number 10 in June, and "Move It Up" ended the U Got 2 Know album project with a number 16 hit in October. At the end of the year, Overett left the group. It later emerged that she had not actually performed on any of the records, though she occasionally performed and sang live, like "Move On Baby" live on Top of the Pops and during a telecast of M6's Dance Machine concert in 1994 in which she did perform "U & Me" live despite a playback in the background.

As for the real voices that were actually used, "U Got 2 Know" included Xaviera Gold's vocals from "You Used to Hold Me", "U Got 2 Let the Music" sampled a vocal from JM Silk's track "Let the Music Take Control", and the vocals for "U & Me" were sampled from a song by Vicki Shepard. "Move On Baby" and "Don't Be Proud" were sung by session singer Eileina Dennis. The hit "Move It Up" was also sung by a session singer now known to be Jackie Rawe. Rap vocals were later confirmed to be performed by former member MC Fixx It. Overett later established a singing career by releasing a single called "Follow Your Heart" in 1995 under the name Kelly O, although it was her only solo single.

=== 1995-1997: Line up changes and War in Heaven ===
In May 1995, Cappella returned with new vocalist Allison Jordan. Before joining Cappella, she had scored a number 23 hit in the UK official top 40 with "The Boy from New York City". Rodney Bishop was also replaced by Patrick Osborne, but returned to the group before long. Before Bishop returned to Cappella, he released two solo singles under the name Bishop titled "Addicted" and "Lift Me Up".

The comeback single "Tell Me the Way" reached number 17 in the UK in September 1995 and was followed by the album War in Heaven, which featured contributions from Mauro Picotto. According to rumors, War in Heaven was almost completely recorded before Overett and Bishop were no longer part of the group. The rap performance on this album mostly consists of samples, but also once again features rap performances by MC Fixx It. The majority of the vocals on this album are from Jordan, however vocals on a few tracks were shared with Katherine Ellis, and some tracks on the album featured Ellis as the sole vocalist.

=== 1997-1998, 2004: Final album, disbandment, and brief resurgence ===
On 25 February 1998, Cappella released their fourth eponymously titled album. The album was supported by three singles, titled "Be My Baby", "U Tore My World Apart", and "Throwin' Away". It is now known that the lead vocals on the album were performed by British vocalist Lorna Bannon. The rap vocals were performed by Italian producer and remixer Tiziano Pagani. After the singles charted less than expected, the group decided to go on tour and promote the new album in Japan later in the same year. Once their Japanese tour was finished, Bishop left the group, and Cappella continued as a solo act with just Jordan for a brief time. Cappella released the single "U R the Power of Love" in September 1998, and shortly afterwards, Cappella disbanded and resorted to releasing remixes of previous hits.

In 2004, the act – now once again faceless, released a brand new trance track called "Angel" which failed to chart. The song features an unknown vocalist with rap samples from MC Fixx It directly from Anticappella's "Move Your Body". A greatest hits CD/DVD was released in August 2005.

=== 2013-2021: Comeback ===
In 2013, the band returned with original producer Gianfranco Bortolotti and new members, a married couple: Lis Birks as a vocalist and Marcus Birks as a rapper. The couple used to perform under the name of the Cameleonz. The Birks performed the past hits of Cappella at '90s revival shows across Europe for 7 years. Despite plans for a new single with the new lineup and some teaser photos taken of them in the studio, nothing materialized and they never released new versions of the Cappella hits.

=== Marcus Birks' death ===
Marcus Birks died on 27 August 2021 from COVID after not taking the COVID-19 vaccine, aged 40. He is survived by Lis and their child. He had been a Covid denialist and spoke with the BBC in August 2021:

"If you haven't been ill, you don't think you're going to get ill, so you listen to the [anti-vaccine] stuff. When you feel like you can't get enough breath, it's the scariest feeling in the world."

=== 2022-present: Second comeback and new music ===
In January 2022, the group revealed on their Instagram page that Lis Birks would step down as a performer and instead manage the band alongside Bortolotti. Simultaneously, the group introduced the new lineup of singer Vikki Waters and rapper Steve Lewis. The group embarked on a European tour from March through October. In June, Lewis left the group and was replaced with Jay McCurdy. In May 2023, Cappella announced they were working on their first single in nearly 20 years, titled "Happy Phonk". The song was released on 13 October 2023. In November 2023, McCurdy left the group and was replaced with Andrew "Aggz" Gidney. Simultaneously, DJ Aroxx (Andy Critchlow) was announced as an addition to support the line-up on stage for occasional shows. On 20 June 2025, in collaboration with Luv Foundation UK and Ruff Loaderz, the group released "Stay Mine", a cover of a 1994 song of the same name by Mary House feat. Gloria. At the same time, Aggz had left the group and a new rapper was introduced, Rikki Dallas, who appears in the music video of the song alongside Vikki. However, the rap performance was performed by Jay McCurdy, and a version re-recorded with Dallas was not made.

== Members ==
Stage performers:

- Singer: Vikki Waters (2022–present)
- Singer: Lis Birks (2013–2021)
- Singer: Allison Jordan (1995–1998)
- Singer: Kelly Overett (1993–1995)
- Singer: Anna Ross (1992–1993)
- Singer: Ettore Foresti (1989–1991)
- Rapper: Rikki Dallas (2025–present)
- Rapper: Andrew Gidney (Aggz) (2023–2025)
- Rapper: Jay McCurdy (2022–2023)
- Rapper: Steven Lewis (2022)
- Rapper: Marcus Birks (2013–2021, died 2021)
- Rapper: Rodney Bishop (1993–1995, 1995–1998)
- Rapper: Patrick Osbourne (1995)
- Rapper: Ricardo Overman (MC Fixx It) (1992–1993)
- DJ: Andy Critchlow (DJ Aroxx) (2023–present)

Recording artists:

- Singer: Vikki Waters (2022–present)
- Singer: Lis Birks (2013–2021) (Live covers only, no releases)
- Singer: Lorna Bannon (1997–1998) (lead vocals on Cappella album)
- Singer: Allison Jordan (1995–1996) (lead vocals, shared lead vocals and backing vocals on the War in Heaven album)
- Singer: Katherine Ellis (1995–1996) (lead vocals and shared lead vocals on the War in Heaven album)
- Singer: Jackie Rawe (1994) (lead vocals on "Move It Up")
- Singer: Eileina Dennis (1994–1995) (lead vocals on "Move On Baby", "U & Me" (album version) and "Don't Be Proud")
- Rapper: Rikki Dallas (2025–present)
- Rapper: Andrew Gidney (Aggz) (2023–2025) (Live covers only, no releases)
- Rapper: Jay McCurdy (2022–2023) (rap performance on "Stay Mine")
- Rapper: Steve Lewis (2022) (Live covers only, no releases)
- Rapper: Marcus Birks (2013–2021, died 2021) (Live covers only, no releases)
- Rapper: Tiziano Pagani (1997–1998) (rap performance on Cappella album)
- Rapper: Ricardo Overman (MC Fixx It) (1994–1996) (rap performance on "Move On Baby, "U & Me", "Move It Up" and the War in Heaven album)

Most of the vocals on the U Got 2 Know album and the earlier Cappella tracks are sampled directly from other songs and not originally recorded for Cappella, which is why they are not included in this list.

=== Former members' activities after Cappella ===
Kelly Overett

In November 2022, former member Kelly Overett resurfaced online and shared many stories, memories and pictures from her time in the group. In an interview from the following month, she shared more details, including clearing up rumors on what led to the end of her time in the group and her brief solo career as Kelly O. 27 years after the release of "Follow Your Heart", Overett revealed there is a music video and a follow-up single called "Into the Light" previously left unreleased, and uploaded both of them on YouTube. When asked if she would ever return to performing with Cappella, she stated:

"I think I am open to appearing at the 90's festivals, which I had no idea of til recently. No. I wouldn't do this with Cappella. People keep saying things like "come back, the audience want to see you", which is crazy to me. I thought I was forgotten, replaced, and erased. If I do progress with anything it will be as Kelly O and a celebration of the music I was a part of."

In a joint statement with Dutch Eurodance group Twenty 4 Seven, it was announced that Overett would return to the stage performing alongside Stay-C for 2023 performances. Stay-C and Overett performed a series of shows lasting from May to September. After their tour finished, Overett moved on to start her solo project and is now performing at '90s revival shows as Kelly O. She has released new songs using her voice, including several covers of the songs she performed during her time in the band.

Allison Jordan

Former member Allison Jordan has retired from performing. She has since changed her name to Cloé Hedger and worked as a psychic medium, owned her own store and performs tarot card readings, a hobby she had during her time in the group. In the years after Cappella originally disbanded, she married her husband Stephen, and together they ran a series of magazines called Paranormal, which lasted for several issues. More recently, she designs and sells her own jewelry, and runs a YouTube channel.

Rodney Bishop

Rodney Bishop has stayed out of the public eye ever since his departure from the group in 1998. When Kelly Overett returned to the Eurodance scene, she stated that she hoped she would reconnect with Bishop as they have not communicated since they first left the group, but would also respect his privacy.

== Discography ==
=== Albums ===
Title	Album details	Peak chart positions										Certifications
Title	Album details	AUT	AUS	FIN	GER	JAP	NED	SCO	SWE	SWI	UK	Certifications
Helyom Halib	Released: 1989; Label: Media Records	—	—	—	—	—	—	—	—	—	—	
U Got 2 Know	Released: 1994; Label: Mercury	8	90	1	10	—	11	9	12	1	10	SWI: Gold; UK: Gold
Move On Baby	Released: 1994; Label: Cutting Edge	—	—	—	—	49	—	—	—	—	—	
War in Heaven	Released: 1996; Label: Media Records	—	—	12	—	66	64	—	—	25	—	
Cappella	Released: 1998; Label: Cutting Edge	—	—	—	—	—	—	—	—	—	—	
Best of Cappella	Released: 2005; Label: ZYX Music	—	—	—	—	77	—	—	—	—		
"—" denotes items that did not chart or were not released in that territory.

=== Singles ===
Year	Title	Peak chart positions										Certifications	Album
Year	Title	ITA	AUT	BEL	FIN	GER	IRE	NED	SWE	SWI	UK	Certifications	Album
1988	"Push the Beat/Bauhaus"	—	—	—	—	—	—	—	—	—	60		Helyom Halib
1989	"Helyom Halib"	—	—	—	—	—	29	—	—	—	11		Helyom Halib
1989	"House Energy Revenge"	—	—	—	—	—	—	—	—	—	73		Helyom Halib
1990	"Get Out of My Case"	—	—	—	—	—	—	—	—	—	—		Helyom Halib
1990	"Everybody Listen to It"	—	—	—	—	—	—	—	—	—	101		Non-album single
1991	"Everybody"	—	—	—	—	—	—	—	—	—	66		U Got 2 Know
1992	"Take Me Away" (featuring Loleatta Holloway)	—	—	—	—	—	12	—	—	—	25		Non-album single
1993	"U Got 2 Know"	—	—	30	—	21	7	26	—	29	6		U Got 2 Know
1993	"U Got 2 Know" (revisited)	—	—	—	—	—	—	—	—	—	43		U Got 2 Know
1993	"U Got 2 Let the Music"	8	1	6	1	3	6	9	14	1	2	AUT: Gold; GER: Platinum; UK: Silver	U Got 2 Know
1994	"Move On Baby"	3	3	7	1	4	9	1	9	1	7	GER: Gold	U Got 2 Know
1994	"U & Me"	5	15	14	1	14	25	4	15	13	10		U Got 2 Know
1994	"Move It Up"	8	—	17	6	33	26	8	—	19	16		U Got 2 Know
1995	"Don't Be Proud"	—	—	27	—	—	—	26	—	—	—		U Got 2 Know
1995	"Tell Me the Way"	6	—	27	15	—	29	24	—	35	17		War in Heaven
1996	"I Need Your Love"	20	34	—	6	—	—	30	—	—	—		War in Heaven
1996	"Turn It Up and Down"	—	—	—	7	—	—	—	54	—	—		War in Heaven
1997	"Do You Run Away Now"	—	—	—	10	—	—	—	—	—	—		War in Heaven
1997	"Be My Baby"	—	—	—	11	—	—	—	—	—	53		Cappella
1997	"U Tore My World Apart"	—	—	—	—	—	—	—	—	—	—		Cappella
1998	"Throwin' Away"	—	—	—	—	—	—	—	—	—	—		Cappella
1998	"U R the Power of Love"	—	—	—	—	—	—	—	—	—	—		Non-album singles
2002	"U Got 2 Know 2002"	—	—	—	—	—	—	—	—	—	97		Non-album singles
2004	"Angel"	—	—	—	—	—	—	—	—	—	—		Non-album singles
2023	"Happy Phonk"	—	—	—	—	—	—	—	—	—	—		Non-album singles
2025	"Stay Mine" (with Luv Foundation UK and Ruff Loaderz)	—	—	—	—	—	—	—	—	—	—		Non-album singles
"—" denotes items that did not chart or were not released in that territory.

== See also ==
- 49ers – one of Gianfranco Bortolotti's other Italo house acts of the era
- Anticappella
- Nukleuz
