= You Used to Hold Me (Ralphi Rosario song) =

Single by Ralphi Rosario featuring Xaviera Gold
- Released: 1987
- Genre: House; diva house
- Length: 3:21
- Label: Hot Mix 5 Records
- Songwriter(s): Ralphi Rosario, Xaviera Gold
- Producer(s): Ralphi Rosario, Kenny Jason

"You Used to Hold Me" is a song by American DJ/producer Ralphi Rosario, featuring singer Xaviera Gold. Released as a single in 1987, the song was a hit and remains Rosario's most popular song.

In 1994, a set of remixes was released on Strictly Hype Recordings, entitled "You Used to Hold Me '94!".

== Track listing ==
- US 12" single

A1. "You Used to Hold Me" (Kenny's Mix) - 6:28
A2. "You Used to Hold Me" (Accapella) - 1:16
A3. "You Used to Hold Me" (You Used To Beat Me Black and Blue) (Bonus Beats) - 3:22
B1. "You Used to Hold Me" (Mucho Michie House Mix) - 8:17
B2. "You Used to Hold Me" (Riviera Mix) - 4:58

== Charts ==
Chart (1994)	Peak position
UK Club Chart (Music Week)	89

== Scott and Leon version ==
In 2000, "You Used to Hold Me" was covered by UK garage duo Scott and Leon featuring singer Sylvia Mason-James on vocals. This version was a top 20 hit, peaking at No. 19 on the UK Singles Chart and No. 5 on the UK Dance Singles Chart.

=== Charts ===
Chart (2000)	Peak chart position	
Chart (2000)	Peak chart position	Number of weeks on chart
UK Singles (OCC)	19	4
UK Dance Singles (OCC)	5	8
