= 49ers (group) =

Italian electronic music act

- Origin: Brescia, Italy
- Genres: Eurodance, Italo house
- Years active: 1988-1998
- Labels: Media Records; Island; 4th and Broadway
- Past members: Gianfranco Bortolotti; Luca Cittadini; Diego Leoni; Pieradis Rossini; Ann-Marie Smith

49ers was an Italian house and Eurodance act, featuring producers and DJs Gianfranco Bortolotti, Luca Cittadini, Diego Leoni and Pieradis Rossini with vocalist Ann-Marie Smith. They were named after the San Francisco 49ers American football team.

In 1990, two of their songs reached number-one on the US Billboard Hot Dance Club Play chart; "Touch Me" and "Don't You Love Me".

== Background ==
=== Formation and debut album ===
The project was formed in 1988, by the producer Gianfranco Bortolotti. The debut single, "Die Walküre", was based on a vocal from Freeez's "I.O.U." (although the woman in the video is Josy Gil Persia) and reached #20 on the French Singles Chart. It was followed by "Shadows" one year later. After this, the group recruited Dawn Mitchell to front the act. "Touch Me" was partially based on an Aretha Franklin sample ("Rock-a-Lott"), whilst its chorus line was taken from Alysha Warren's song, "Touch Me". "Don't You Love Me" featured a vocal sample from Jody Watley's hit "Don't You Want Me" and peaked at number 78 on the Billboard Hot 100. Other borrowed phrases and hooks are dispersed throughout the accompanying album. It was revealed that Mitchell was Lip-syncing the vocals on "Touch Me". She then provided vocals on five other songs from that album.

"Touch Me" became a number 3 hit in the UK Singles Chart in January 1990, whilst "Don't You Love Me" peaked at number 12 and the single "Girl to Girl" peaked at number 31 in that same listing.

=== The follow-up albums ===
A remix album and the stand-alone single "Believe In Me" (which Mitchell co-wrote and sang) was released in 1991. Soon afterwards, Mitchell left the act and was replaced by Ann-Marie Smith. It is said that she was the 49th vocalist to audition. The second album, Playing With My Heart, was released in 1992. The album spawned five singles, "Move Your Feet", "Got to Be Free", "The Message", "Everything" and "Keep Your Love".

=== Other singles ===
The single "Rockin' My Body" reached number 31 on the UK Singles Chart. They released four more singles including "Lovin' You", "Baby I'm Yours", "I Got The Music (aka I Got It)" and "Let The Sunshine In". Following this, the act broke up in 1998.

In 2010, 49ers briefly returned with a single for Italian label Ego Music, entitled "Je Cherche Apres Titine", which featured samples from Charlie Chaplin's comedy film "Modern Times" from 1936.

In September 2012, Gianfranco Bortolotti revived Media Records under new name, Media Songs s.r.l. In 2013, 49ers released a song called "Shine on in love" with a singer Cheryl Porter.

== Former members ==
- Gianfranco Bortolotti - production/arrangement/songwriting (1988–1998)
- Luca Cittadini - additional production/arrangement/songwriting (1988–1992)
- Diego Leoni - additional production/arrangement/songwriting (1988–1992)
- Pieradis Rossini - additional production/arrangement/songwriting (1988–1991)
- Alysha Warren (real name: Alyesha Wallen) - lead female (uncredited) vocals on "Touch Me" (1989–1990)
- Josy Gil Persia - performer (1988–1990)
- Dawn Mitchell - performer - although Mitchell's voice was used on "Don't You Love Me", "I Need You", "Girl to Girl", "How Longer, "I Will Survive" and "Believe In Me". (1989–1991)
- Ann-Marie Smith - vocals (1991–2002)
- Cheryl Porter - vocals (2013)
- Chris Mazelle - vocals (2022)

== Discography ==
=== Studio albums ===
Title	Album details	Peak chart positions		
Title	Album details	AUS	SWE	UK
49ers	Released: 1990; Label: Island; Formats: CD, Cassette	56	41	51
Playing with My Heart	Released: September 1992; Label: Island; Formats: CD	179	—	—

=== Compilation albums ===
Title	Album details
The Remix Album	Released: 1991; Label: Island
Greatest Hits 1990-2002	Released: 2004; Label:

=== Singles ===
Year	Single	Peak chart positions														Album
Year	Single	ITA	AUS	AUT	BEL (FLA)	FRA	GER	IRE	NED	NZ	SWE	SUI	UK	US	US Dance	Album
1988	"Die Walküre"	—	—	—	—	20	—	—	—	—	—	—	—	—	—	49ers
1989	"Shadows"	—	—	—	—	—	—	—	—	—	—	—	—	—	—	49ers
1989	"Touch Me"	—	18	9	20	—	7	4	18	15	8	6	3	—	1	49ers
1990	"Don't You Love Me"	—	61	—	36	—	25	6	—	—	17	10	12	78	1	49ers
1990	"How Longer" (ITA only)	—	—	—	—	—	—	—	—	—	—	—	—	—	—	49ers
1990	"Girl to Girl"	—	116	—	—	—	70	13	—	—	—	20	31	—	—	49ers
1990	"I Need You"	20	—	—	—	—	—	—	—	—	—	—	—	—	—	49ers
1992	"Move Your Feet"	6	—	—	—	—	—	—	—	—	—	—	—	—	—	Playing with My Heart
1992	"Got to Be Free"	—	182	—	—	—	—	—	—	—	—	—	46	—	38	Playing with My Heart
1992	"The Message"	—	—	—	—	—	—	—	—	—	—	—	68	—	32	Playing with My Heart
1993	"Everything"	—	—	—	—	—	—	—	—	—	—	—	—	—	—	Playing with My Heart
1993	"Keep Your Love"	—	—	—	—	—	—	—	—	—	—	—	—	—	—	Playing with My Heart
1994	"Rockin' My Body"	—	163	—	—	—	—	—	—	—	—	—	31	—	—	Singles only
1995	"Hangin' on to Love" (FIN only)	—	—	—	—	—	—	—	—	—	—	—	—	—	—	Singles only
1996	"Lovin' You"	—	—	—	—	—	—	—	—	—	—	—	—	—	—	Singles only
1996	"Baby I'm Yours"	9	—	—	—	—	—	—	—	—	—	—	—	—	—	Singles only
1997	"I Got the Music (I Got It)"	21	—	—	—	—	—	—	—	—	—	—	—	—	—	Singles only
1998	"Let the Sunshine In" (FR only)	—	—	—	—	—	—	—	—	—	—	—	—	—	—	Singles only
"—" denotes releases that did not chart or were not released.

== See also ==
- Cappella
- List of number-one dance hits (United States)
- List of artists who reached number one on the US Dance chart
