= Italo house =

Type of house music originating in Italy

- Stylistic origins: Italo disco; house; chicago house; garage house; diva house; Balearic beat
- Cultural origins: Late 1980s, Italy, UK and US
- Derivative forms: Eurodance; Italo dance; progressive house

Other topics
- Styles of house music

Italo house (often simply referred to as "Italian" or "Italian house" in the UK) is a form of house music originating in Italy. Typically popular in Italy, Britain, and United States since the late 1980s, it fuses house music and Italo disco. The genre's main musical characteristic is its use of predominantly electronic piano chords in a more lyrical form than classic Chicago house records. The best known example is Black Box's "Ride on Time", but the genre became very popular in the late 1980s and early 1990s for the uplifting and anthemic tunes against the background of indie-dance.

== History ==
While the name was not yet developed, early notable Italo-house acts would include Klein + M.B.O. and Alexander Robotnick. The genre reached mainstream popularity in 1989, with Ride on Time reaching the top ten in all of Europe except Italy. "Italo-house" as it became known in the early 1990s was a happy, euphoric sound; pioneered essentially by the production stable of Gianfranco Bortolotti, whose alter egos included Cappella, R.A.F., East Side Beat, and the 49ers. Records produced in Italy dominated the UK dance charts of 1990/91 with tunes including Asha's "JJ Tribute" (lead vocals by Joyce Chung), DJ H's "Think About", Last Rhythm's "Last Rhythm", and Jinny's "Keep Warm" signifying the uplifting, happy vibe. Artists such as K-Klass, Bassheads, and Felix built on the Italian piano sound to create uplifting tunes still played out today, although the pioneers of the sound such as DJ Sasha have long since left the happy vibe of piano house to concentrate on other styles.

== See also ==
- Italo dance
- Italo disco
- Eurobeat
- Eurodance
- Afro/cosmic music
- Balearic beat
