= Gianfranco Bortolotti =

Italian producer (born 1959)

- Born: 2 May 1959 (age 67); Brescia, Italy
- Genres: Italo house
- Years active: Late 1980s–early 1990s

Gianfranco Bortolotti (Italian pronunciation: [dʒaɱˈfraŋko bortoˈlɔtti]; born 2 May 1959) is an Italian electronic music producer and manager of Media Records and Media Studio. He was a member of Cappella, and 49ers who had several hits, and Fits of Gloom, who had a UK No. 47 hit with "Heaven" and a UK No. 49 hit with "The Power of Love" featuring Lizzy Mack. In the United States, he scored a No. 1 single on Billboard's Dance Club Songs chart with "Deep in My Heart" as a member of the group Clubhouse in 1991.

Originally becoming a DJ to supplement his university days, he helped distribute records for DJ Pierre and after scoring a few minor hits, re-invested money back into Media Records. The success of Media enabled him to invest in at least ten different studios, producing hits at a sweatshop pace.
