= Light My Fire (disambiguation) =

"Light My Fire" is a song by The Doors, from their debut album The Doors, which has also been released under the name Light My Fire.

Light My Fire may also refer to:

== Music ==
- Light My Fire (Bob Thiele and Gábor Szabó album), 1967
- Light My Fire (Baccara album), 1978
- "Light My Fire" (Club House song), 1993
- "Light My Fire" (Will Young song), 2002
- "Light My Fire" (Boom Boom Satellites song), 2003
- "Light My Fire", Mr. Capone-E track on Diary of a G ft. Snoop Dogg, 2009
- "Light My Fire" (Kotoko song), 2011
- Light My Fire (Eliane Elias album), 2013
- Light My Fire: A Classic Rock Salute to The Doors, a tribute album, 2014

== Books ==
- Light My Fire (book), a 1998 memoir by The Doors' keyboard player Ray Manzarek

== See also ==
- "Relight My Fire"
