= Deep in the Heart =

Deep in the Heart may refer to:

- "Deep in the Heart" (song), 1987 song by U2
- Deep in the Heart (film), 2014 Chinese film

== See also ==
- Deep in My Heart (disambiguation)
