= Hidalgo Serra =

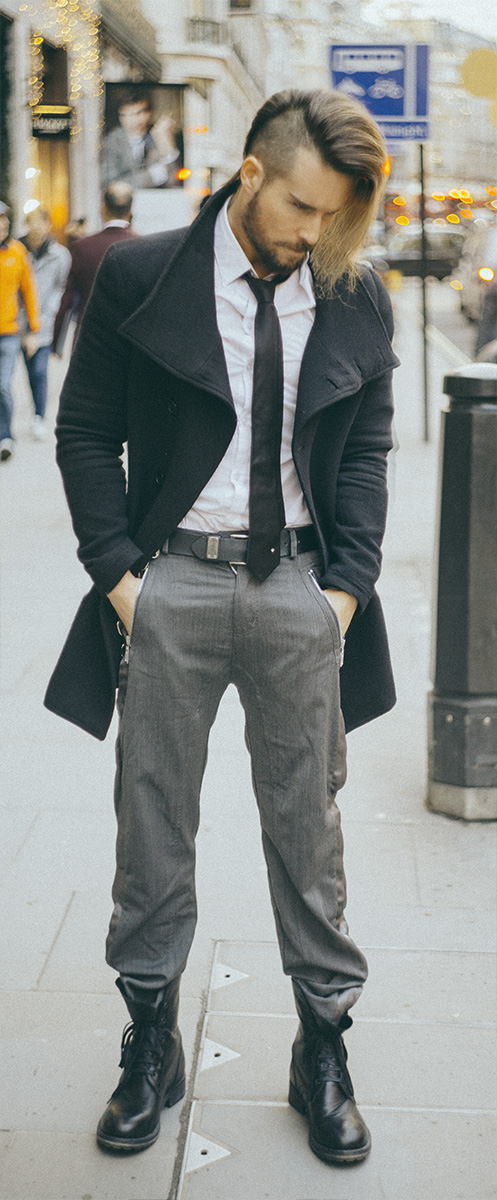
- Born: Oviedo, Asturias
- Education: New York Film Academy
- Occupations: Contemporary artist, musician, producer, actor, writer, director
- Musical career
- Genre: Electronic
- Years active: 1996–2012

Hidalgo Serra is a Spanish-Italian contemporary artist, actor, director, writer and music producer. He is the co-founder of Underdogs Animation Studio, and works there as a writer and director. Together with Gianfranco Bortolotti and Silver Pozzoli, he was in the band Club House, which had singles reaching the top of the charts. Also, he is the member of the Estonian Film Directors Guild. Currently, he lives in Rome, Italy, and is mainly focused on contemporary art.

== Life and career ==
Serra was born in Oviedo and has grown up between Italy and the United States, where he studied music at the Boston Berklee College of Music. He left the college after a few years to pursue the dream of becoming an actor. Prior to becoming an actor, he tried working in different fields, including composing soundtracks, producing dances, and writing and creating comic books which he did in New York City.

As a son of Enrico Serra, musician and orchestral composer, he began his career very early at the age of three, when he was introduced to some basic steps in music. During this period, he was offered a role in the movie Bim Bum Bam, directed by Aurelio Chiesa. After having some minor roles, he worked as a dance producer for five years. He also started DJing and he produced some remixes for artists Jimmy Somerville and Darlene Lewis. In 2009, he was involved in lot of different projects, ranging from Sanremo Music Festival to roles in TV fiction shows and sitcoms. During his career, he also worked as a model for Calvin Klein and Dolce & Gabbana.

From 2010, Serra is the director of the Underdogs Animation Studio, Estonian visual effects team established in 2007. Beside being the director, he is also involved in creative processes and he is one of the writers, producers and supervisors of the projects. One of the projects was creating 3D graphics for the movie Burn to Shine, directed by Marco Perego Saldana in 2016. Also, they worked with Ubisoft on creating some of the Far Cry 3 characters.

== Music career ==
During his music career Serra worked with the artists and bands, creating the music, lyrics and remixes for them. Some of the artists and band are: Mauro Picotto, Gigi D'Agostino, Leone Di Lernia, Cappella, Jimmy Somerville, Darlene Lewis, Mig 29, and Sharada House Gang. He was also the member of Club House. Below are listed some of the songs and albums Serra worked on.

Artist	Title	Label	Year
Jam 11	For Me	Aries Records	1992
Leone Di Lernia	I Can Make It		1993
Kim Wilde	Kids in America 1994	MCA Records	1994
Club House	Living in the Sunshine	Media Records	1994
Sharada House Gang	Keep It Up (Jungle Mix)	Media Records	1994
Club House	Nowhere Land	Media Records	1994
Schiffer	Sleeping with the Snake	Signal	1995
Axcel	Mystic Land	RCA	1995
Jimmy Somerville	Heartbeat (Mars Plastic Mix)	London Records	1995
Cappella	War in Heaven	Cutting Edge	1996
Cappella	Back in Your Life	Cutting Edge	1996
Darlene Lewis	I Love the Way You Love Me	KEY Records (12)	1996
Sin City (feat. Bogus Brothers)	Could You Be Love	ZAC Records	1997
House Bam	Everywhere	Hpower Records	1999
Cappella	Back in Your Life	ZYX Music	2006

== Filmography ==
- Bim Bum Bam, directed by Aurelio Chiesa (1981)
- Il mio amore è scritto nel vento, directed by Cèsar loori (1987)
- La città prigioniera, directed by Umberto carpi (1990)
- Shade, directed by Nicolas louis (2003)
- Genoma, directed by Albert Roeg (2009)
- White Room, directed by Helger Raitzner (2009)
