= Deep in My Heart (song) =

Single by Club House
- Released: 1990
- Recorded: 1989
- Genre: Italo house, dance
- Length: 6:10
- Label: Atlantic (U.S.); Media Records (Italy); FFRR (UK); Airplay/Carrere (France); ZYX/Metronome (Germany)
- Songwriters: Diego Leoni, Mario Mori, Gianfranco Bortolotti, Silvio Pozzoli, Dmitry Brill, Hwa Dong Chung, Kierin Kirby, Pietro Rossini

Club House singles chronology
"I'm Alone" (1989)	"Deep in My Heart" (1990)	"I'm Falling, Too" (1991)

"Deep in My Heart" is a 1990 song that was recorded and produced by the Italian act Clubhouse, featuring Silver Pozzoli on vocals. The single spent one week at number one on the Hot Dance Club Play chart during the week of August 14, 1991, giving the group their first number one on the Billboard chart, although this was their second single in the United States (as they peaked at No. 75 on the Billboard Hot 100 with "Do It Again Medley with Billie Jean"). The single sampled portions of Kier Kirby's vocals (the "Ye Yay" chorus) from Deee-Lite's 1990 single "Power of Love".

== Critical reception ==
In his book In Pista!, italian writer Rocco Bargioni says: "this song is the perfect soundtrack for a night in New York, and since Italian records were actually making their way to America back then, it didn’t take long for it to become a hit. It even found its way into the hands of the great David Morales, who couldn’t quite match the original’s beauty (impossible!) but whose remix certainly helped propel it to number one on the U.S. dance charts". He also describes producer Gianfranco Bortolotti as "a true market strategist and one of the most brilliant and successful figures in this genre in Italy".

== Track listing ==
US release

1. Deep in My Heart (Radio Edit by DJ Professor) 3:53
2. Deep in My Heart (Extended Mix by DJ Professor) 6:10
3. Deep in My Heart (American Mix, featuring Eric Kupper [keyboards], Peter Schwartz, and David Morales) 6:30
4. Deep in My Heart (La-Da-De Mix by DJ Professor) 5:38
5. Deep in My Heart (Wax Dub - Vocal, featuring Eric Kupper [keyboards], Peter Schwartz, and David Morales) 7:02
6. Deep in My Heart (Red Zone, featuring Eric Kupper [keyboards], Peter Schwartz, and David Morales) 6:19

Italian release

1. Deep in My Heart (Extended Mix) 6:21
2. Deep in My Heart (Funky House Version) 6:41
3. Deep in My Heart (Afro Mix) 6:45

French release

1. Deep in My Heart (A Touch of Techno) (Radio Mix) 3:50
2. Deep in My Heart (A Touch of Techno) 6:47
3. Deep in My Heart (Extra House Funky Mix) 6:57

UK release

1. Deep in My Heart (Extended Mix) 6:09
2. Deep in My Heart (Funky House Version) 4:12
3. Deep in My Heart (Afro Mix) 6:12

German release (ZYX Records; Metronome released the radio version)

1. Deep in My Heart (Extended Mix) 6:21
2. Deep in My Heart (Funky House Version) 4:15
3. Deep in My Heart (Afro Mix) 6:16

Japanese release (Media Records – ALCB 360)

1. Deep in My Heart (Extended Mix) 6:13
2. Deep in My Heart (Funky House Version) 4:16
3. Deep in My Heart (Afro Mix) 6:16
4. Deep in My Heart (Radio Edit) 4:14
5. Deep in My Heart (Funky Radio) 3:46
6. Deep in My Heart (Europe House Mix) 5:30
7. Deep in My Heart (A Touch of Techno) 5:40
8. Deep in My Heart (Extra House Funky Mix) 5:36
9. Deep in My Heart (American 12" Mix) 6:31
10. Deep in My Heart (Desert Storm Mix) 4:17
11. Deep in My Heart (Red Zone Mix) 6:21

== Chart history ==
Chart (1990)	Peak position
Dutch Singles Chart	41
UK Singles Chart	55
US Hot Dance Club Play	1
