= Up & Down (Eddy Huntington song) =

1987 single by Eddy Huntington

Single by Eddy Huntington

from the album Bang Bang Baby
- B-side: "Up & Down (Instrumental)"
- Released: 1987
- Genre: Italo disco
- Length: 3:32 (album version); 3:23 (single version)
- Label: Esquire
- Songwriter(s): Roberto Turatti; Miki Chieregato; Tom Hooker
- Producer(s): Roberto Turatti; Miki Chieregato

Eddy Huntington singles chronology
"U.S.S.R." (1986)	"Up & Down" (1987)	"Meet My Friend" (1987)

"Up & Down" is a song by English singer Eddy Huntington, released as a single in 1987. It is from his debut studio album, Bang Bang Baby (1989).

== Track listings ==
- Italian 7-inch single

A. "Up & Down" (vocal) – 3:23
B. "Up & Down" (instrumental) – 3:56

- Italian 12-inch maxi-single

A. "Up & Down" – 6:33
B. "Down and Up" (instrumental) – 5:00

== Credits and personnel ==
- Eddy Huntington – vocals
- Roberto Turatti – songwriter, producer, arranger
- Miki Chieregato – songwriter, producer, arranger
- Tom Hooker – songwriter
- Franco Zorzi – mixing

Credits and personnel adapted from the Bang Bang Baby album and 7-inch single liner notes.

== Charts ==
Weekly chart performance for "Up & Down"
Chart (1987)	Peak position
Finland (Suomen virallinen lista)	12
West Germany (GfK)	68
