= Taffy (singer) =

- Born: Katherine Quaye; 1963 (age 62–63)
- Origin: Deptford, London, England
- Genres: Hi-NRG, Italo disco
- Occupation: Singer
- Instrument: Vocals
- Years active: 1977–1988
- Labels: Ibiza Records, Transglobal, Phoenix Productions

Katherine Quaye (born 1963), better known by her stage name Taffy, is an English hi-NRG and Italo disco singer from Deptford, London, best known for her 1980s hit, "I Love My Radio".

The song was produced by Claudio Cecchetto, who was behind all her previous hits in Italy. It was released in the United Kingdom by Rhythm King's Transglobal Records, both part of Mute Records in those days, and was originally a hit in Italy in 1985. The song's sentiments were about a disc jockey broadcasting in the early hours. As very few radio stations in the United Kingdom broadcast after midnight in the late 1980s, this reference in the record was changed. A re-recorded version called "I Love My Radio (Dee Jay's Radio)" was released instead. This is the version that reached No. 6 on the UK Singles Chart.

"Step by Step", a Silver Pozzoli cover, was a minor hit in the UK reaching No. 59 in 1987. A second version by a pre-S'Express Mark Moore was released as "Step by Step (Moore Heavenly Mix)".

Taffy sang on Ferry Aid's charity cover of "Let It Be" in 1987.

== Singles ==
- "White & Black" (1982/1986)
- "Walk into the Daylight" (1984/1985) (Italy No. 20)
- "I Love My Radio (Midnight Radio)" (12" single) (1985), Ibiza/Break Records (Italy No. 5, Germany No. 35)
- "Once More" (1985/1986) (Italy No. 3)
- "I Love My Radio (Dee Jay's Radio)" (1986), Transglobal Records (UK No. 6)
- "Step by Step" (1987), Transglobal Records (UK No. 59, Italy No. 42)
- "Whose?" (1987)
- "If You Feel It" (1988)
