= Tattoo It =

Studio album by Paul Lekakis
- Released: August 1990
- Recorded: 1987–1990
- Studios: Science Lab; Homeboy Recording; Axis Studios; D&D Studios; Right Track Recording; Marathon Studios; Emerald Recording Studios
- Genres: Hi-NRG; dance-pop
- Length: 43:08
- Label: Sire
- Producers: David Frank; Mic Murphy; Shep Pettibone; Michelle Newsome; P. Dennis Mitchell; Ronald Cudek; Jeff Vincent; Daniel Abraham; Tony Moran; Patrick Adams; Tommy G; Willy Jolley; Ric Wake; Richie Jones; Roberto Turatti

Singles from Tattoo It
- 1. "Boom Boom (Let's Go Back to My Room)" Released: 1987; 2. "You Blow Me Away" Released: 1989; 3. "My House" Released: 1990; 4. "Tattoo It on Me" Released: 1990

Professional ratings
Review scores
Source	Rating
Allmusic	2/5 stars

Tattoo It is the only studio album by American pop / Hi-NRG singer Paul Lekakis, released on Sire Records in 1990. It contains the hit single, "Boom Boom (Let's Go Back to My Room)", which Lekakis had previously released in 1987 on Polydor Records. Two of the tracks on the album, "You Blow Me Away" and "My House", were produced by Shep Pettibone. The track "Are You Man Enough" features additional vocals by Lisa Bellamy.

== Track listing ==
No.	Title	Writer(s)	Producer(s)	Length
1.	"Tattoo It on Me"	Robert Cohen; Jeff Vincent	David Frank; Mic Murphy	4:46
2.	"My House"	Jody Watley; Bruce Woolley	Shep Pettibone	4:33
3.	"You Know You Want It"	Michael Wiley	Michelle Newsome; P. Dennis Mitchell; Ronald Cudek	4:08
4.	"I Will Be There"	Paul Lekakis; Vincent	Vincent	3:58
5.	"One Step Closer"	Vincent	Vincent; Daniel Abraham	4:08
6.	"Lips"	Andy Marvel; Tony Moran	Moran	5:02
7.	"So I Heard"	Vincent	Vincent; Abraham	3:59
8.	"You Blow Me Away"	L. Russell Brown; Tommy Page	Pettibone	4:05
9.	"Are You Man Enough" (featuring Lisa Bellamy)	Dennis Lambert; Brian Potter	Patrick Adams; Tommy G; Willy Jolley	4:10
10.	"Boom Boom (Let's Go Back to My Room)"	Miki Chieregato; Riccardo Ballerini; Roberto Turatti; Stefano Montin; Tom Hooker	Ric Wake; Richie Jones; Turatti	4:01
Total length:				43:08

== Personnel ==
- David Frank – keyboards (1)
- Jeff Vincent – keyboards, programming (4, 7)
- Merv DePeyers – keyboards (5, 7)
- Andy Marvel – keyboards (6)
- Richie Tancredi – keyboards (10)
- Alan Friedman – programming (2, 8)
- Fred McFarlane – programming (2, 3, 8); keyboards (3)
- Joe Moskowitz – programming (8)
- John Booth – guitar, backing vocals (3)
- Ted Kezios – guitar (5, 7)
- Roberta Gilliam – backing vocals (2)
- Michelle Wiley – backing vocals (3)
- Sonia Sumner – backing vocals (4)
- Jim Tunnell – backing vocals (6)
- Carole Davis – backing vocals (7)
- Kelly Sae – backing vocals (7)
