= Dons of Disco =

- Directed by: Jonathan Sutak
- Produced by: Anna Roberts; Jonathan Sutak; Brian Volk-Weiss
- Starring: Stefano Zandri; Tom Hooker; Miki Chieregato; Roberto Turatti
- Cinematography: Sean McDaniel
- Edited by: Noah Kistler; Jonathan Sutak
- Release date: October 15, 2018
- Running time: 82 minutes
- Country: United States
- Languages: English; Italian

Dons of Disco is a 2018 American documentary film directed by Jonathan Sutak. It details the career of the Italo disco musical artist Den Harrow and controversy surrounding his identity. Tom Hooker, who provided vocals for a number of Den Harrow recordings, seeks credit for his vocal performances attributed to Den Harrow. Through interviews with the producers and performers who created Den Harrow, the history of the musical project is detailed.

== Synopsis ==
Den Harrow, a popular pop star in 1980s Italy, was rumored to have someone else ghostwriting his music. Producers Roberto Turatti and Miki Chieregato, known as his "secret voice," were credited on Den Harrow releases. American musician Tom Hooker joined the Den Harrow project and became the vocalist behind the scenes. Stefano Zandri, a dancer spotted by the group, was chosen to be the face of Den Harrow.

With Turatti, Chieregato, and Hooker working behind the scenes, Den Harrow gained success in Italy while Zandri performed live. In 1987, to hide Hooker's involvement, support for a Tom Hooker single was withdrawn in favor of Den Harrow's "Don't Break My Heart." In 1994, Hooker moved back to America and pursued a career in surreal photography.

After years of silence, Hooker claimed ownership of vocals on several Den Harrow releases through a YouTube video. Zandri revealed that he had allowed Hooker to provide vocals while he lip-synced. Zandri spoke positively about the arrangement and accused Hooker of breaking a gentlemen's agreement that would damage Den Harrow's reputation.

Despite initially turning down offers, Hooker eventually performed at a concert and introduced Den Harrow as a project similar to Milli Vanilli. During a Chicago concert, all acts were shut down due to sound issues. Hooker and Chieregato continued the tour and performed a successful concert in Los Angeles.

A Den Harrow fan noticed similarities between Hooker's "Bad Boy" video and Den Harrow's voice, prompting Turatti to explain the various voices used for Den Harrow, including Chuck Rolando, Silver Pozzoli, Hooker, and even Zandri himself. Hooker signed autographs after a Los Angeles concert and told a fan that Zandri had no involvement in the Den Harrow recordings.

Zandri credited Hooker as a talented writer and singer in an interview, but Hooker expressed anger and ended his association with Den Harrow after Zandri claimed credit for his songs. Zandri faced financial difficulties due to unpaid taxes on his Den Harrow earnings and struggled to find work. He performed local shows using Hooker's vocals until he appeared on a reality show and met his wife.

Zandri desired to sever ties with Den Harrow, but agreed to perform as Den Harrow at a German discotheque. He surprised everyone by singing live during the performance. Zandri thanked Turatti, Chieregato, and Hooker on Facebook, although Hooker was blocked from seeing the message.

Although Hooker claimed to have wanted this outcome, he declined a duet with Zandri and distanced himself due to Zandri's negative comments about his family.

== Release ==
The film debuted on October 15, 2018, at the Rome Film Festival. It saw wide release through streaming platforms on December 17, 2020.

== Critical reception ==
Writing for The New Yorker, Richard Brody compliments the clarity in tone found in the film being "consistently reportorial in tone and wink-free, even while presenting situations of such a hyperbolic wonder that they feel unreal."
