= Linda Jo Rizzo =

German singer

- Born: April 1, 1955 (age 71); New York City, New York, U.S.
- Origin: Germany
- Genre: Eurodisco
- Occupations: Singer, songwriter, producer
- Years active: 1983–present
- Formerly of: The Flirts

Linda Jo Rizzo (born 1 April 1955) is a German singer, songwriter and producer. Originally from the United States, she was a photo model and studied nutrition in New York. There she met Bobby Orlando and participated in his group, the Flirts, from 1983 to 1984. In 1984, Rizzo moved to Germany and started her own music career there.

Rizzo was the owner of an Italian music restaurant in Munich called Piazza Linda, which was sold in August 2008.

== Discography ==
=== Albums ===
- Passion (1989) (bootleg)
- Best of Linda Jo Rizzo (1999)
- Day of the Light (2012)
- P.A.S.S.I.O.N. (2013) (The Flirts Hits featuring Linda Jo Rizzo)
- Fly Me High (2015)

=== Singles ===
- 1985: "Fly Me High / Welcome to Cairo"
- 1986: "You're My First, You're My Last / I've Got the Night"
- 1986: "Heartflash (Tonight) / Just One World"
- 1987: "Perfect Love / No Lies"
- 1988: "Passion / Hey Joe"
- 1989: "Keep Trying / Listen to the D.J."
- 1991: "Quando Quando"
- 1993: "Passion / Just the Way You Like It"
- 1994: "Meet the Flintstones" - Stone-Age feat. Linda Jo
- 2012: "Heartflash", "Passion" & "You're My First, You're My Last 2012"
- 2013: "Day of the Light"
- 2013: "Out of the Shadows" - TQ & Linda Jo Rizzo
- 2014: "Stronger Together" - Linda Jo Rizzo feat. Fancy
- 2015: "Life Is a Story" - Linda Jo Rizzo & TQ
- 2017: "I Want You Tonight" - Linda Jo Rizzo & Tom Hooker
- 2019: "Policeman"
- 2019: "A Different Kind of Magic" - Linda Jo Rizzo & Ken Laszlo
- 2020: "Dance in the Moonlight"
- 2020: "Just Stay"
- 2020: "Helpless" - Linda Jo Rizzo & Marc Reason
- 2020: "You're My First, You're My Last" - Linda Jo Rizzo & DJ Tommy M
- 2020: "The Mass Is Full"
- 2020: "Hope from Above"
- 2021: "Play Me a Song (Mr. DJ)" - Linda Jo Rizzo & Victor Ark
- 2021: "On and On"
- 2021: "Perfect Love (ZYX Edit Remastered 2021)"
- 2022: "Come into My Life (Let the Worries Go)"
- 2022: "Fotonovela"
- 2022: "You're My First, You're My Last (Remastered 2022)"
- 2022: "Heartflash (Tonight) (ZYX Edit Remastered 2022)"
- 2023: "Once Before I Go"
- 2023: "Forever (Radio Edit)"
- 2023: "Passion (Acoustic Version)"
