= Around My Dream =

1985 single by Silver Pozzoli

Single by Silver Pozzoli

from the album Around My Dream
- B-side: "Around My Dream (Instrumental)"
- Released: 1985
- Genre: Italo disco
- Label: Many
- Songwriters: Graziano Pegoraro; Pier Michele Bozzetti; Romano Bais
- Producer: Stefano Scalera

Silver Pozzoli singles chronology
"Around My Dream" (1985)	"Step by Step" (1985)

"Around My Dream" is the debut single by Italian singer Silver Pozzoli, released in 1985, under the label Many Records. The song charted in the top 30 of several countries across Europe, with its highest chart position in Germany, at No. 9. The song also charted in South Africa, where it reached No. 1 for 4 consecutive weeks.

Belgian duo Kazino released their version on the Carrere label around the same time, and reached the top 10 in Belgium and France.

== Track listing and formats ==
- Italian 12-inch single

A. "Around My Dream" (Vocal) – 5:38
B. "Around My Dream" (Instrumental) – 6:05

- German 7-inch single

A. "Around My Dream" (Vocal) – 3:28
B. "Around My Dream" (Instrumental) – 3:28

- German 12-inch maxi-single

A. "Around My Dream" (Vocal) – 5:25
B. "Around My Dream" (Instrumental) – 6:05

== Credits and personnel ==
- Silver Pozzoli – vocals
- Graziano Pegoraro – songwriter, arranger
- Pier Michele Bozzetti – songwriter
- Romano Bais – songwriter, arranger
- Stefano Scalera – producer
- Mario Flores – mixing
- Fabio Nosotti – cover art, photographer

Credits and personnel adapted from the 7-inch single liner notes.

== Charts ==
=== Weekly charts ===
Weekly chart performance for "Around My Dream"
Chart (1985)	Peak position
Belgium (Ultratop 50 Flanders)	20
France (SNEP)	21
Netherlands (Single Top 100)	21
Switzerland (Schweizer Hitparade)	25
West Germany (GfK)	9

=== Year-end charts ===
Year-end chart performance for "Around My Dream"
Chart (1985)	Position
West Germany (Official German Charts)	55

== Kazino version ==
"Around My Dream"

Single by Kazino

from the album Shoot
- B-side: "Binary"
- Released: 1985
- Genre: Synth-pop
- Length: 4:05
- Label: Carrere
- Songwriters: Graziano Pegoraro; Pier Michele Bozzetti; Romano Bais

Kazino singles chronology
"Around My Dream" (1985)	"Sahara Woman" (1985)

A version by Belgian duo Kazino charted around the same time as Pozzoli's, and was more successful in Belgium and France, peaking at numbers 8 and 4, respectively.

=== Track listing and formats ===
- French 7-inch single

A. "Around My Dream" – 4:05
B. "Binary" – 3:56

- French 12-inch maxi-single

A. "Around My Dream" – 5:25
B. "Binary" – 3:56

=== Credits and personnel ===
- Jean-Philippe Bonichon – engineering
- Mouche Vormstein – cover art, photographer
- Claude Caudron – cover art designer

=== Charts ===
==== Weekly charts ====
Chart (1985)	Peak position
Belgium (Ultratop 50 Flanders)	8
France (SNEP)	4

==== Year-end charts ====
Chart (1985)	Position
Belgium (Ultratop 50 Flanders)	94
France (SNEP)	34

=== Certifications and sales ===
Certifications and sales for "Around My Dream"
Region	Certification	Certified units/sales
France (SNEP)	Gold	500,000^{*}
^{*} Sales figures based on certification alone.
