= Deep in My Heart =

Deep in My Heart may refer to:

- Deep in My Heart (1954 film), 1954 American biographical musical film
- Deep in My Heart (1999 film), 1999 American television film
- "Deep in My Heart" (song), a 1990 song by Clubhouse, featuring Silver Pozzoli
- "Deep in My Heart", a song by Britney Spears from the album ...Baby One More Time, 1999
- "Deep In My Heart", a song by the Drums from the album Encyclopedia, 2014
