= Eddy Huntington =

British singer and teacher (born 1965)

- Born: Edward Huntington; 29 October 1965 (age 60); Peterlee, England
- Occupations: Singer; teacher
- Musical career
- Genres: Italo disco; Europop
- Instrument: Vocals
- Years active: 1983–present
- Label: ZYX

Edward Huntington (born 29 October 1965) is an English pop singer who began his professional singing career in Italy. Huntington became popular in Europe and the former USSR mainly with his song "U.S.S.R." which peaked at No. 6 in Switzerland and No. 23 in Germany.

== Biography and career ==
Eddy Huntington was born in the northeast of England and moved to London at the age of 18, where he became a music video extra and model.

He was discovered by Baby Records, an Italian record label that took him to Milan to record the song "U.S.S.R." written by R. Turatti, M. Chieregato and T. Hooker who also sings on refrains.

When "U.S.S.R." was released throughout Europe in 1986 on ZYX Records it became a big hit in mainland Europe and in the Soviet Union and is widely popular to this day. Huntington went on to have other lesser-known hits such as "May Day" and "Meet My Friend". He also released the album Bang Bang Baby in 1989.

Huntington left the music industry in the early 1990s and trained to become a primary school teacher in the UK. He taught at Eldon Grove Primary School in Hartlepool teaching children in year 1. He provided after-school drama and singing lessons as well as everyday lessons. He then moved to Thailand for two years with his wife teaching at Bangkok Patana School. There his youngest son was born, which prompted a move back to England, where he was the head of a community primary school, Rosebrook Primary School.

In 2005, Huntington made a brief return to music opening the Discoteka '80s concerts in Russia. These were two performances of European and Soviet 1980s pop stars held in Moscow and Saint Petersburg. Among the acts headlined were: Bonnie Tyler, Alphaville, Sabrina Salerno, Mike Mareen, and Savage. Both concerts played to large stadium crowds, appeared on national television and were released on DVD.

In 2011, Huntington recorded the song "Honey, Honey!" together with Russian pop duo Discobonus, written by members Igor Sorokin and Andrew Mosckalev.

Huntington released "Rainy Day in May" on 26 February 2013. The track was inspired by the 1960s sound of his musical hero, Sir Cliff Richard. Written by Frank Scott and Morten Franck and produced by Scott and Tommy Olsen, it was released on the Norwegian label KVK Digital.

In 2020, Huntington left his job as a headteacher at Rosebrook Primary School, to work as Head of Education for Stockton Council. Eddy retired as Assistant Director of Education, Inclusion & Achievement (SBC) in 2025. He has since been back in the studio.

== Discography ==
=== Studio albums ===
- Bang Bang Baby (1989)

=== Singles ===
- "U.S.S.R." (1986)
- "Up & Down" (1987)
- "Meet My Friend" (1987)
- "Physical Attraction" (1989)
- "May Day" (1988)
- "Bang Bang Baby" (1988)
- "Shock in My Heart" (1989)
- "Hey Senorita" (1990)
- "Future Brain" (Cyber Mix) (1997)
- "USSR 2003" with Beatbone (2003)
- "Love for Russia" (2009)
- "Honey Honey" (2011)
- "Rainy Day in May" (2013)
- "Warsaw in the Night (Cinderella)" (2017)
