= Step by Step (Silver Pozzoli song) =

1985 single by Silver Pozzoli

- Artwork for the German vinyl single release

Single by Silver Pozzoli

from the album Around My Dream
- B-side: "Step by Step (Instrumental)"
- Released: 1985
- Recorded: August 1985
- Genre: Italo disco
- Length: 3:35
- Label: Many
- Songwriters: Graziano Pegoraro; Naimy Hackett; Romano Bais
- Producer: Stefano Scalera

Silver Pozzoli singles chronology
"Around My Dream" (1985)	"Step by Step" (1985)	"From You to Me" (1986)

"Step by Step" is a song by Italian singer Silver Pozzoli from his debut studio album, Around My Dream (1987). It was released as a single in 1985 and was a top 20 hit in Belgium and the Netherlands.

== Track listing and formats ==
- Italian 7-inch single

A. "Step by Step" (Vocal) – 3:35
B. "Step by Step" (Instrumental) – 3:15

- Italian 12-inch single

A. "Step by Step" (Club Mix) – 5:45
B1. "Step by Step" (Radio Version) – 3:35
B2. "Step by Step" (Dub Mix) – 3:15

- German 7-inch single

A. "Step by Step" – 3:40
B. "Step by Step" (Mix Dub Version) – 3:28

- German 12-inch maxi-single

A. "Step by Step" – 5:25
B1. "Step by Step" (Single Version) – 3:40
B2. "Step by Step" (Mix-Dub-Version) – 3:28

== Credits and personnel ==
- Silver Pozzoli – vocals
- Graziano Pegoraro – songwriter, arranger
- Naimy Hackett – songwriter
- Romano Bais – songwriter, arranger
- Stefano Scalera – producer
- Marco Sabiu – engineering, mixing, arranger
- Luca Orioli – arranger
- Mario Flores – mixing
- Andreas Wendle – cover art, photographer

Credits and personnel adapted from the 7-inch single liner notes.

== Charts ==
Weekly chart performance for "Step by Step"
Chart (1985–1986)	Peak position
Belgium (Ultratop 50 Flanders)	19
Netherlands (Dutch Top 40)	22
Netherlands (Single Top 100)	18

== Taffy version ==
"Step by Step"

Single by Taffy
- B-side: "Whose?"
- Released: 1987
- Genre: Italo disco
- Length: 3:58
- Label: Transglobal
- Songwriters: Graziano Pegoraro; Naimy Hackett; Romano Bais
- Producer: Pascal Gabriel

Taffy singles chronology
"I Love My Radio" (1985)	"Step by Step" (1987)	"If You Feel It" (1988)

In 1987, English singer Taffy recorded her version of "Step by Step" and released it as a single. It was a minor hit, peaking at No. 52 on the Dutch Single Top 100 chart and at No. 59 on the UK Singles Chart.

=== Track listing and formats ===
- UK 7-inch single

A. "Step by Step" – 3:58
B. "Whose?" – 4:37

- UK 12-inch single

A. "Step by Step" (Angel Gabriel Mix) – 8:49
B1. "Whose?" – 4:35
B2. "Step by Step" (Piano Traxx) – 4:16

=== Credits and personnel ===
- Taffy – vocals
- Pascal Gabriel – producer
- Rex Brough – arranger
- Arabella Rodriguez – engineering

=== Charts ===
Chart (1987)	Peak position
Netherlands (Single Top 100)	52
UK Singles (OCC)	59
