= I Love My Radio =

Single by Taffy
- Released: 1985 (Italy & Europe); 1986 (UK & North America)
- Genre: Italo disco
- Length: 3:23
- Label: Ibiza Records, Transglobal/Rhythm King
- Songwriters: Claudio Cecchetto, Graziano Pegoraro, Pier Michele Bozzetti
- Producer: Claudio Cecchetto

Taffy singles chronology
"Once More" (1985)	"I Love My Radio" (1985)	"Step By Step" (1987)

"I Love My Radio (Midnight Radio)" is a song by Italo disco singer Taffy, first released as a single in 1985. It was produced by Italian record producer Claudio Cecchetto. The song was a top ten hit in Italy and the United Kingdom, and was also a hit in several countries in Europe. In the United Kingdom, the single was released in 1986 and peaked at No. 6 on the UK Singles Chart in early 1987.

== Composition ==
The song is about a radio disc jockey broadcasting in the early hours. However, as the BBC's BBC_Radio_1 popular music station did not broadcast after midnight in the 1980s (only a few commercial pop music stations did, as well as the nighttime UK targeted Radio Luxembourg on MW/AM), this reference in the record was changed, and the UK version was re-recorded and retitled as "I Love My Radio (Dee Jay's Radio)", with a few changes in lyrics; the lyric "DJ after midnight" was changed to "DJ up to midnight" and "on the midnight radio" was changed to "on the good time radio".

== Charts ==
Chart	Peak position
German Singles Chart	35
Ö3 Austria Top 40	26
Dutch Single Top 100	42
Irish Singles Chart	6
UK Singles Chart	6
US Billboard Dance Club Songs	6
