= Swiss Boy =

Single by Lou Sern
- B-side: "Cuckoo Clock" (instrumental)
- Released: January 1986
- Recorded: 1985
- Genre: Italo disco
- Length: 5:05
- Label: Esquire Records
- Songwriter: Tom Hooker
- Producer: Tom Hooker

"Swiss Boy" is a single by Italo disco singer Tom Hooker, released in 1986 under the pseudonym Lou Sern (a pun on the Swiss city of Lucerne). At the beginning and towards the end of the song, a recreation of the Westminster Quarters clock chime can be heard. The single was backed with the track "Cuckoo Clock (Instrumental)". Although the song was popular in Italy and in Europe, it was a much bigger hit in the Philippines, where it still remains popular to this day.

The single was released on Esquire Records (Italy), Carrere Records (France), Indisc Records (Belgium), Transmedia Records (Portugal), Sanni Records (Spain), Greyhound Records (United Kingdom), WEA Records (under the Mobile Disco Records label, Philippines), Papagayo Records (Germany), and on Vinyl Independent Records (Europe).

== Track listings ==
7" vinyl single

Side one

1. "Swiss Boy" (Tom Hooker) – 3:33

Side two

1. "Cuckoo Clock" (instrumental) (Tom Hooker) – 3:35

12" vinyl single

Side one

1. "Swiss Boy" (Tom Hooker) – 5:05

Side two

1. "Cuckoo Clock" (instrumental) (Tom Hooker) – 5:03
