= Slingshot (band) =

US musical group

Slingshot is a disco/dance music band from Detroit, Michigan. Its members include Jack Tann, Greg Sawton, David Van DePitte and John Lewis.

Their one and only chart entry was a 1983 cover version of a medley of Steely Dan's song "Do It Again" and Michael Jackson's No. 1 hit single "Billie Jean", originally done in the same year by Italo disco studio project Clubhouse. This track (which is listed on the Rhino Records album Billboard Top Dance Hits 1983 as "Do It Again Medley with Billie Jean") hit No. 1 on the Billboard Hot Dance Club Play chart on August 20, 1983. They also recorded a unique version of AC/DC's 1980 hit "You Shook Me All Night Long" with singer Kathy Kosins vocalizing the lyrics over Kraftwerk's "Tour de France", as performed by the group.

== See also ==
- List of number-one dance hits (United States)
- List of artists who reached number one on the US Dance chart
