= U.S.S.R. (song) =

1986 single by Eddy Huntington

Single by Eddy Huntington

from the album Bang Bang Baby
- B-side: "You (Excess) Are"
- Released: 1986
- Genre: Italo disco
- Length: 3:53 (album version); 3:24 (single version)
- Label: Esquire
- Songwriters: Roberto Turatti; Miki Chieregato; Tom Hooker
- Producers: Roberto Turatti; Miki Chieregato

Eddy Huntington singles chronology
"U.S.S.R." (1986)	"Up & Down" (1987)

Audio
- "U.S.S.R." on YouTube

"U.S.S.R." is the debut single by English singer Eddy Huntington, released in 1986, under the label Esquire Records. The single was featured on his debut studio album, Bang Bang Baby (1989).

== Track listing and formats ==
- Italian 7-inch single

A. "U.S.S.R." – 3:24
B. "You (Excess) Are" – 3:43

- Italian 12-inch maxi-single

A. "U.S.S.R." – 5:53
B. "You (Excess) Are" – 5:20

== Credits and personnel ==
- Eddy Huntington – vocals
- Roberto Turatti – songwriter, producer, arranger
- Miki Chieregato – songwriter, producer, arranger
- Tom Hooker – songwriter
- Cedric Beatty – engineering

Credits and personnel adapted from the Bang Bang Baby album and 7-inch single liner notes.

== Charts ==
Weekly chart performance for "U.S.S.R."
Chart (1986–1987)	Peak position
Europe (European Hot 100)	78
Switzerland (Schweizer Hitparade)	6
West Germany (GfK)	23
