= Paul Lekakis =

Greek-American actor, model, filmmaker and singer

- Born: October 22, 1966 (age 59); New York City, United States
- Genres: Hi-NRG, house, pop
- Occupations: Model, actor, singer

Paul Lekakis (born October 22, 1966) is an American model, actor and dance music/hi-NRG singer, who was discovered for his musical and dancing skills at an Italian nightclub while on assignment as a model.

== Music career ==
His debut single, "Boom Boom (Let's Go Back to My Room)", was released in 1987. The hit version was produced by the Italo disco producers Miki Chieregato, Tom Hooker and Roberto Turatti, with additional production by Ric Wake. The song was originally released on ZYX Records and peaked at No. 43 on the Billboard Hot 100, No. 60 on the UK Singles Chart, No. 7 in New Zealand, No. 2 in Canada and No. 1 on the Pop charts in Australia (for 5 weeks) and Japan. This single received attention for its suggestive lyrics (Boom boom boom / Let's go back to my room / So we can do it all night / And you can make me feel right) and is Lekakis's best-known song. This led to a recording contract with Sire Records, who released his debut album Tattoo It in 1990. The album included the Top 20 Hot Dance Club Play hit, "My House".

Lekakis sang the title track to the British film The Fruit Machine, which was released in 1988. In the US, the film was renamed Wonderland. This song was produced by Stock Aitken Waterman.

Lekakis has since had further success in the dance music genre with the club hits "Let It Out", "Assume the Position", and "(I Need A) Vacation".

In late 2006, Lekakis filmed a music video for a remix of "Boom Boom (Let's Go Back to My Room)" in Palm Desert, California. The track featured slightly different lyrics from the original (i.e., "...how would you like to come back for another boom boom"). The video was directed by Walid Azami. In late July 2007, the 20th anniversary remix appeared on the Billboard dance chart. In 2009, "Boom Boom" ranked No. 83 on VH1's "Top 100 Greatest One-Hit Wonders of the 80's" list.

In 2012, after five years of not releasing music, Lekakis returned with the song "I Need a Hit". In September 2012, Lekakis released the digital download-only single "Meet Me on the Dancefloor".

In July 2016, Lekakis embarked on an 8 date Australian tour with other popular '80s performers. It was his first visit to the country after having a No.1 hit ("Boom Boom") in 1987.

On July 28, 2016, his new song "All Around the World" was released on iTunes, followed by "Somebody (Is Out There)" in September 2017.

In December 2022, Lekakis released a new single titled "Rainbow".

== Acting career ==
Lekakis had roles in Sex, Politics & Cocktails in 2002, then in the queer horror film, Hellbent, a co-starring role in the 2001 film Circuit, and various roles on the television programs Out of Practice and Passions. In June 2005, Lekakis and fitness trainer Clay Adkins released a fitness DVD, Partners, that was sold at Target stores throughout the United States.

He performed in the James Edwin Parker two-man stage play 2 Boys in a Bed on a Cold Winter's Night alongside Scott Douglas Cunningham at the Lorraine Hansberry Theatre in San Francisco, California in July 2007.

== Personal life ==
Lekakis is gay. He tested positive for HIV around 1989, though he did not make this widely known until the 1990s. In recent years, he has played HIV-positive characters in several of his film appearances and has spoken out publicly on HIV-related issues. In 2000, Lekakis appeared on the cover of the February issue of POZ magazine, where he also gave an interview, relating, among other reminiscences, his time as a male prostitute in West Hollywood between 1994 and 1997, and in the interview admitted to intentionally exposing his escort johns to HIV. Lekakis said in the article "he had unprotected sex with clients (as a male escort) whom he did not inform of his HIV status. He also admitted to lying to clients about his status and then having unprotected sex with them". He eventually "joined a 12-step group and quit drinking, doing drugs and turning tricks". Lekakis currently lives in West Hollywood, CA.

== Discography ==
=== Albums ===
- Tattoo It (1990)

=== Singles ===
- "Boom Boom (Let's Go Back to My Room)" (1987) – US No. 43, US Dance Chart No. 6, UK No. 60, NZ No. 7, CAN RPM No. 4, AUS No. 1 (for 5 weeks), South Africa No. 1, Japan No. 1
- "Fruit Machine" (1988) – produced by Stock/Aitken/Waterman
- "You Blow Me Away" (1989)
- "My House" (1990) – US Dance Chart No. 17
- "Tattoo It On Me" (1990)
- "Let It Out" (1993)
- "See Me, Feel Me" (1996) – dance remake of The Who's song of the same name; promo-only released by Tri Coastal Records and Film Corp.
- "Boom Boom (Let's Go Back to My Room)" ('92 remix) (1992)
- "Boom Boom (Let's Go Back to My Room)" ('97 Skitz remix) (1997)
- "Assume the Position" (2001) – from the Circuit movie soundtrack
- "I Think I Love You" (2004) – from the Hellbent movie soundtrack
- "Paul Lekakis Mega Mix 2004" (2004)
- "(I Need A) Vacation" (2006)
- "Boom Boom (Let's Go Back to My Room)" (20th anniversary remix) (2007)
- "I Need a Hit" (2012)
- "Meet Me on the Dancefloor" (2012)
- "All Around the World" (2016)
- "Somebody (Is Out There)" (2017)
- "Rainbow" (2022)
