= Den Harrow =

Italo disco project

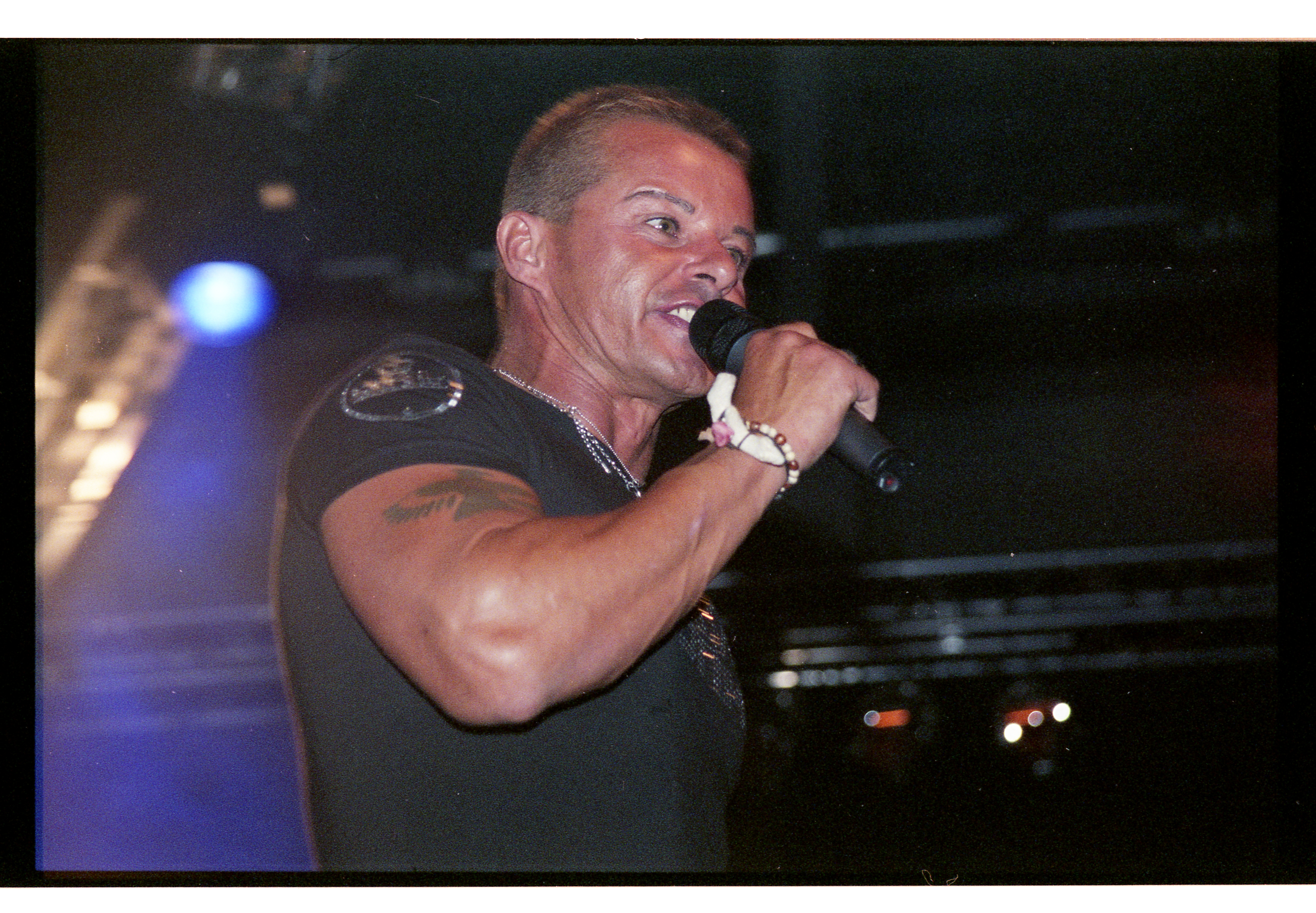
- Stefano Zandri performing in 2006

Background information
- Genres: Italo disco
- Years active: 1983–present
- Labels: Baby; Polydor

Den Harrow was an Italo disco music project that had numerous chart hits in Continental Europe during the second half of the 1980s. Den Harrow was portrayed by male model Stefano Zandri (born 4 June 1962), who served as the face of the project, while American singer Tom Hooker did most of the vocals.

It was later revealed that Zandri did not sing on any of the Den Harrow hits, and that most of the songs were performed and co-written by Hooker. The project was conceived by producers Roberto Turatti and Miki Chieregato, who based it on the Italian word denaro (money).

== History ==
Den Harrow was formed in 1983 by Italian producers Roberto Turatti and Miki Chieregato with Stefano Zandri aka Den Harrow as the face of the project and Tom Hooker doing most of the vocals, as well as songwriting on many of their tracks.

The project became popular in the mid 1980s as part of the Italo disco genre. They scored several hits during that period, such as "Bad Boy, "Catch The Fox," "Charleston," "Future Brain" and "Don't Break My Heart". Harrow's songs charted in numerous European countries during the 1980s, among them Italy with 10 single hits between 1984 and 1988, and West Germany with 8 chart hits between 1985 and 1989.

== Lip-synching controversy ==
After years of fame and popularity, it was revealed by frontman Stefano Zandri and his producers that Zandri did not actually sing any of the songs credited to Den Harrow (except "Born to love" from 1988 and "Ocean" from 1991); he was essentially a character who lip-synced to vocals recorded by a number of other singers. Furthermore, since they did not consider Zandri's name and origin to be "trendy" enough, producers Turatti and Chieregato concealed Zandri's Italian origin, marketing him as having been born Manuel Stefano Curry in Boston, Massachusetts. This was done so that Polydor Records could market him more easily in the English-speaking world, where Italian-produced music was, at the time, viewed with skepticism.

American vocalist Tom Hooker, also known as Thomas Barbey, who was residing in Italy during the Italo disco era and sang most of the songs for the Den Harrow project, including the 1985–1987 European hit singles "Don't Break My Heart", "Bad Boy", "Catch the Fox", and "Future Brain". Another vocalist, Anthony James from England, was contracted to sing the lead vocals on the Lies album (1988), and also provided the lead vocals on songs like "Holiday Night", "My Time", "You Have a Way". During an interview, Tom Hooker explains why it was decided to be done this way:

"There was a small problem, however. He couldn't sing. So the solution was to never let him sing, or to put his voice so low in the mix that it was non-existent. He started as an image. He would work on his costumes and clothes and someone else would sing on the records. The truth is, vision is far more developed in humans than hearing. People tend to buy and listen to what they like to see."

Also according to Tom Hooker, Chuck Rolando's voice was used in the early singles "To Meet Me" and "A Taste of Love". Later on, Silver Pozzoli was chosen to do the single "Mad Desire"; however, Hooker provided the vocals for the album releases of "Mad Desire". Although Hooker continued co-writing tracks for Den Harrow project, the producers wanted to use a higher-voiced vocalist for the 1988 album Lies. Hooker says that Zandri did sing on the 1991 Den Harrow single "Ocean".

In 2010, Tom Hooker recorded and published on YouTube a press conference-style video in which Hooker, flanked by the co-producer/composer Miki Chieregato, states and demonstrates that he was the vocalist on most of the Den Harrow records, and in which he accuses Zandri of continuing to publicly lip sync to those recordings. He also states that Zandri made threats and insults against Hooker and his family on Facebook for exposing the vocal inauthenticity of the Den Harrow recordings. Hooker asserts that Zandri no longer has permission to publicly lip sync to Den Harrow recordings that use Hooker's voice.

Meanwhile, Zandri criticizes that Hooker broke a "gentleman's agreement" in revealing his voice work after it was expected that he would keep silent, as he was explicitly paid only for his vocals.

== Zandri's later career ==
In 1997, Zandri moved to California to take part in the TV series Sunset Beach. In 2005, he hosted the Italian-language TV show Radio Harrow on the satellite TV channel Match Music. In 2006 and in 2012, he took part in a reality show, the Italian version of Celebrity Survivor which broadcast on Rai 2. In 2007, via his website, Zandri released a new song, "FEDEN - Lo so", written and sung by Zandri and his wife.

As of 2026, Zandri does perform occasionally concerts.

== Documentary Dons of Disco ==
The 2018 documentary Dons of Disco addresses the controversy surrounding Den Harrow's identity and specifically Tom Hooker's involvement. Through archival footage and interviews with those involved in the "creation" of Den Harrow, both Zandri and Hooker's claims to Den Harrow's authorship are represented.

== Discography ==
=== Studio albums ===
Title	Album details	Peak chart positions		
Title	Album details	GER	SWE	SWI
Overpower	Released: 1985; Label: Baby Records, Ariola; Formats: CD, Cassette, LP	—	29	20
Day by Day	Released: 1987; Label: Baby Records, Ariola; Formats: CD, Cassette, LP	13	25	4
Lies	Released: 1988; Label: Baby Records, Ariola; Formats: CD, Cassette, LP	63	—	—
"—" denotes items that did not chart or were not released.

=== Compilation albums ===
Title	Album details	Peak chart positions
Title	Album details	GER
The Best Of	Released: 1989; Label: Baby Records, Ariola; Formats: CD, Cassette, LP	18
I Successi	Released: 1999; Label: D.V. More Record; Formats: CD, Cassette, LP	—
"—" denotes items that did not chart or were not released.

=== Re-worked compilation albums with new songs ===
Title	Album details
I, Den	Released: 1996; Label: S.A.I.F.A.M.; Formats: CD, Cassette, LP
Back from the Future	Released: 1999; Label: Do It Yourself; Formats: CD, Cassette, LP

== Singles ==
Title	Year	Peak chart positions							Album
Title	Year	ITA	FRA	GER	SPA	SWE	SWI	US Dance	Album
"To Meet Me"	1983	—	—	—	—	—	—	—	Non-album singles
"A Taste of Love"	1983	—	—	—	—	—	—	—	Non-album singles
"Mad Desire"	1984	15	—	—	—	—	—	—	Overpower
"Bad Boy"	1985	3	17	20	10	—	11	—	Overpower
"Future Brain"	1985	9	17	—	6	—	6	50	Overpower
"Overpower" / "Broken Radio"	1985	—	—	—	—	—	—	—	Overpower
"Charleston"	1986	8	27	18	—	—	17	—	Overpower
"Catch the Fox (Caccia Alla Volpe)"	1986	7	—	27	12	16	8	—	Day by Day
"Day by Day Remix"	1987	29	—	—	—	—	—	—	Day by Day
"Don't Break My Heart"	1987	8	—	4	—	—	6	—	Day by Day
"Tell Me Why"	1987	15	—	22	—	—	12	—	Day by Day
"Energy Rain"	1987	—	—	—	—	—	—	—	Day by Day
"You Have a Way"	1988	10	—	56	—	—	—	—	Lies
"Born to Love"	1988	13	—	45	—	—	—	—	Lies
"Lies" / "I Wanna Go"	1988	—	—	—	—	—	—	—	Lies
"My Time" / "You Have a Way"	1988	—	—	—	—	—	—	—	Lies
"Holiday Night"	1989	—	—	38	—	—	—	—	The Best Of
"Take Me Back"	1989	—	—	—	—	—	—	—	Non-album singles
"Ocean"	1991	—	—	—	—	—	—	—	Non-album singles
"All I Want is You"	1992	—	—	—	—	—	—	—	Non-album singles
"Real Big Love"	1992	—	—	—	—	—	—	—	Non-album singles
"You and the Sunshine"	1993	—	—	—	7	—	—	—	Non-album singles
"Take Me"	1993	—	—	—	—	—	—	—	I, Den
"The Universe of Love"	1994	—	—	—	—	—	—	—	I, Den
"I Need a Lover"	1995	—	—	—	—	—	—	—	Non-album single
"Tomorrow is Another Day"	1995	—	—	—	—	—	—	—	I, Den
"I Feel You"	1996	—	—	—	—	—	—	—	I, Den
"Future Brain '98"	1998	—	—	—	—	—	—	—	Back from the Future
"Go Away"	1999	—	—	—	—	—	—	—	Back from the Future
"Don't Break My Heart (2001 Remixes)"	2001	—	—	—	—	—	—	—	Back from the Future
"Push Push"	2006	—	—	—	—	—	—	—	Non-album single
"Always"	2021	—	—	—	—	—	—	—	Non-album single
"—" denotes a title that did not chart, or was not released in that territory, or chart-peaks are not available.

== See also ==
- Milli Vanilli, a German-based musical group who achieved fame before also revealing that the "lead singers" also lip-synced.
