= Billie Jean =

1983 single by Michael Jackson

- UK single picture sleeve, reused for Spotify reissue

Single by Michael Jackson

from the album Thriller
- B-side: "Can't Get Outta the Rain"
- Released: January 2, 1983
- Recorded: 1982
- Studio: Westlake (Los Angeles, California)
- Genre: Post-disco; funk; dance-pop; synth-pop; R&B
- Length: 4:57 (original album/European single version); 4:52 (album reissue/US single version with early fade out); 6:21 (12-inch version)
- Label: Epic
- Songwriter: Michael Jackson
- Producers: Quincy Jones; Michael Jackson

Michael Jackson singles chronology
"The Girl Is Mine" (1982)	"Billie Jean" (1983)	"Beat It" (1983)

Music video
- "Billie Jean" on YouTube

Alternative cover
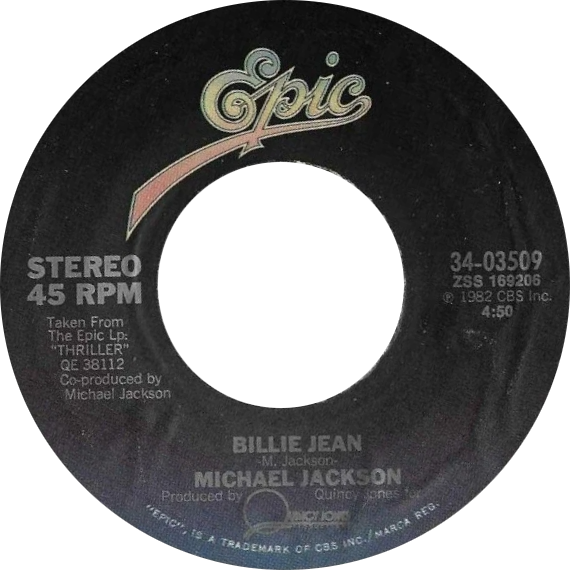
- Side A of the US 7-inch vinyl single

"Billie Jean" is a song by the American singer Michael Jackson, released by Epic Records on January 2, 1983, as the second single from Jackson's sixth studio album, Thriller (1982). It was written by Jackson and produced by Jackson and Quincy Jones. "Billie Jean" blends post-disco, R&B, funk, dance-pop and synth-pop. The lyrics describe a young woman, Billie Jean, who claims that the narrator is the father of her newborn son, which he denies. Jackson said that the lyrics were based on groupies' claims about Jackson's older brothers when Jackson toured with them as members of the Jackson 5.

"Billie Jean" reached number one on the Billboard Hot 100, topped the Billboard Hot Black Singles chart within three weeks, and became Jackson's fastest-rising number one single since his time as a member of the Jackson 5. It reached number one in the UK, Australia, Canada, France, Ireland, Switzerland and Belgium, and the top ten of the music charts in many other countries. "Billie Jean" was one of the best-selling singles of 1983, helping Thriller become the best-selling album of all time, and became Jackson's best-selling solo single. "Billie Jean" is certified diamond in the US and with 18 million copies worldwide, is one of the highest-selling singles of all time. In 2026, following the release of the biopic Michael, "Billie Jean" surged on streaming platforms globally and became Jackson's first number-one single on the Billboard Global 200 chart.

Jackson's performance of "Billie Jean" on the TV special Motown 25: Yesterday, Today, Forever was nominated for an Emmy Award. It introduced a number of Jackson's signatures, including the moonwalk, rhinestone glove, black sequined jacket, and high-water pants, and was widely imitated. The "Billie Jean" music video, which was directed by Steve Barron, was the first performance by a black artist to be aired in heavy rotation on MTV. Along with the other videos produced for Thriller, it helped establish MTV and make videos an integral part of popular music marketing. The spare, bass-driven arrangement helped pioneer what one critic called "sleek, post-soul pop music".

"Billie Jean" received honors including two Grammy Awards and an American Music Award. Billboard ranked it as the No. 2 song for 1983. A list compiled by Rolling Stone and MTV in 2000 ranked "Billie Jean" the sixth-greatest pop song since 1963. Rolling Stone placed it at number 58 on its list of The 500 Greatest Songs of All Time in 2004, and at number 44 in its updated 2021 list. The song was also included in the Rock and Roll Hall of Fame's 500 Songs that Shaped Rock and Roll.

== Background ==
There never was a real Billie Jean. The girl in the song is a composite of people my brothers have been plagued with over the years. I could never understand how these girls could say they were carrying someone's child when it wasn't true.

— Michael Jackson, Moonwalk (1988)

Jackson said that "Billie Jean" was based on groupies he and his brothers encountered while they performed as the Jackson 5. "They would hang around backstage doors, and any band that would come to town they would have a relationship with, and I think I wrote this out of experience [sic] with my brothers when I was little. There were a lot of Billie Jeans out there. Every girl claimed that their son was related to one of my brothers."

According to Jackson's biographer J. Randy Taraborrelli, "Billie Jean" was inspired by letters Jackson received in 1981 from a woman claiming he was the father of one of her twins. Jackson, who regularly received letters of this kind, had never met the woman and ignored those claims. However, she continued to send letters stating that she loved him and wanted to be with him, asking how he could ignore "his own flesh and blood". The letters disturbed him so much that he began to suffer nightmares.

Eventually, Jackson received a parcel containing a photograph of the fan, a gun, and a letter instructing him to die at a particular time. The fan would do the same once she had killed "their" baby, so they could be together in the "next life". The Jacksons later discovered that the fan had been sent to a psychiatric hospital.

== Production ==
Jackson said he felt "Billie Jean" would be a success as he was writing it: "A musician knows hit material. Everything has to feel in place. It fulfills you and it makes you feel good. That's how I felt about 'Billie Jean'." He said that, hearing it in his head while in his car, he was so absorbed that he did not realize his car had caught fire until a passing motorcyclist informed him.

Jackson disagreed with the producer, Quincy Jones, about the song. According to some reports, Jones felt it was too weak to be included on Thriller, but Jones denied this. Jones disliked the demo and did not care for the bassline, and wanted to cut Jackson's 29-second introduction. Jackson, however, insisted that it be kept. According to Jones, he conceded when Jackson said it made him want to dance: "And when Michael Jackson tells you, 'That's what makes me want to dance', well, the rest of us just have to shut up."

Jones also wanted to change the title to "Not My Lover", as he believed that people would think the song referred to the tennis player Billie Jean King. Jackson refused to change the title and asked Jones to give him co-producing credits for the track, as he felt that the finished product sounded close to his demo. In addition, Jackson wanted extra royalties. Jones granted him neither and the two fell out for several days.

The American composer Michael Boddicker said that Jackson played the synthesizer part in one take on the Yamaha CS-80 in seven minutes. However, the synthesizer player Bill Wolfer disputed this, saying he played the CS-80 chords on both the demo and the album version, and that Boddicker was misremembering the session: "Everyone who worked with Michael Jackson knows that he didn't play keys but a tiny bit, and never played them on a record!" According to Wolfer, the part was his sound design: he programmed it to form a hybrid of brass and string sounds, which had a vocal-like quality. Jackson heard Wolfer experimenting with the sound on the CS-80 during the Triumph Tour with the Jacksons, which he liked and called Wolfer in for.

Engineer Bruce Swedien had Jackson sing his vocal overdubs through a six-foot cardboard tube. Jackson's lead vocal was performed in one take; he had received vocal training every morning throughout the production of the song. Jazz saxophonist Tom Scott played the lyricon, an electronic wind instrument. Bassist Louis Johnson played his part on every bass guitar he owned, before Jackson settled for a Yamaha bass.

Instructed by Jones to create a drum sound with "sonic personality" that no one had heard before, Swedien constructed a platform for the drum kit with special elements including a flat piece of wood between the snare and hi-hat. He said: "There aren't many pieces of music where you can hear the first three or four notes of the drums, and immediately tell what the piece of music is. But I think that is the case with 'Billie Jean'—and that I attribute to sonic personality."

Swedien mixed the song 91 times—unusual for him, since he usually mixed a song just once. The mixes grew progressively worse, and Jones asked Swedien to listen again to the second mix, which was much better. The second mix was the final version.

== Composition ==
"Billie Jean" by Michael Jackson
"Billie Jean", a number-one hit single in many countries and written and co-produced by Jackson, mixed uptempo funk and disco with the somber themes of paranoia and obsession.

"Billie Jean" blends post-disco, rhythm and blues, funk, dance-pop, and synth-pop. The song opens with a standard drum beat along with a standard hi-hat, and joined two bars later with a cabasa accompanied by a repetitive bassline. Each time it passes through the tonic, the note is doubled by a distorted synth bass. This accompaniment is followed by a repetitive three-note synth, played staccato with a deep reverb. The defining chord progression is then established. Jackson's quiet vocals enter, accompanied by a finger-snap, which comes and goes during the verses, as the rhythm and chord progression repeats. Greg Phillinganes, who played keys, said of the song: "'Billie Jean' is hot on every level. It's hot rhythmically. It's hot sonically, because the instrumentation is so minimal, you can really hear everything. It's hot melodically ... lyrically [and] vocally. It affects you physically, emotionally, even spiritually."

According to Jones, Jackson "stole" notes from the Jon and Vangelis song "State of Independence"; Jones had produced Donna Summer's cover of the song, and Jackson had sung backing vocals. According to Jon Anderson, "They took the riff and made it funky for 'Billie Jean' ... So that's kinda cool, that cross-pollination in music." According to Daryl Hall of Hall & Oates, Jackson told him he had taken the "Billie Jean" groove from their 1981 track "I Can't Go for That (No Can Do)". Hall told him "Oh Michael, what do I care? You did it very differently."

According to Inside the Hits, the lyrics refer to the commotion created by Billie Jean on a dance floor. She entices the crowd with a seductive come-on before luring the narrator to her bedroom, through the fragrance of her perfume. Jackson's vocal range spanned from a high baritone to a falsetto and he usually wrote melodies to show this range. However, in the verses of "Billie Jean", his vocals range from a tenor to a low falsetto. A four-note falsetto is showcased in the chorus and, during the last line, Jackson peaks at a full octave. The song is in the key of F♯ minor with a tempo of 117 beats per minute, while the verses are in the key of F♯ Dorian. Following the first chorus, a cello-like synth eases in at the beginnings of both the third, and later, the fourth, verses. Upon the announcement that the baby's eyes resemble the narrator's, a voice laments, "oh no", and this is mixed louder on the single and on later pressings of the Thriller album. The bridge debuts the strings, and holds a pedal tone tonic with the exception of two lines and a chord leading into the chorus. Violins are then played, followed by a four-note minor guitar part. During the guitar part, vocal shouts, screams and laughs are added. Throughout this, the chord progression remains unaltered and is laced with Jackson's vocal hiccups. All the musical and vocal elements are then brought together in the final chorus. In the fade, the narrator repeats his denial of fathering Billie Jean's child.

== Reception ==
On November 30, 1982, Thriller was released to critical and commercial success. On January 2, 1983, "Billie Jean" was released as the second single, after "The Girl Is Mine". It reached number one on the Billboard Hot 100 on March 5, 1983 and stayed there for seven weeks, becoming Jackson's biggest solo hit. Billboard ranked it as the number two song for 1983. "Billie Jean" topped the R&B chart within three weeks, and became Jackson's fastest-rising number one single since "ABC", "The Love You Save" and "I'll Be There" in 1970, which he recorded as a member of the Jackson 5. It remained at number one for nine weeks on the R&B chart, being preceded by the Gap Band's "Outstanding", before the single was eventually succeeded by George Clinton's "Atomic Dog". "Billie Jean" peaked at number nine on the Adult Contemporary chart. It was also number one in the UK singles chart. "Billie Jean" and Thriller topped both the singles and album charts in the same week on both sides of the Atlantic simultaneously, a feat few acts have achieved. The song was the third best-selling single of 1983 in the US and ninth in the UK. It also reached number one in Canada, Switzerland and Belgium, and the top ten in Austria, Italy, New Zealand, Norway and Sweden. In 2026, after the release of the biographical film Michael, the song re-entered the Billboard Hot 100 debuting at number 15 the week ending May 23, 2026, and also entered the Billboard Global 200 chart for the first time, debuting at number one the week ending May 23, 2026, marking a historic milestone for Michael Jackson as the first artist who died before the creation of the Global 200 chart to reach number one.

Billboard called "Billie Jean" a "brilliant piece of writing" and "one of [Jackson's] finest performances." In a Rolling Stone review, Christopher Connelly described it as a "lean, insistent funk number whose message couldn't be more blunt: 'She says I am the one/But the kid is not my son'". He added that the track was a "sad, almost mournful song, but a thumping resolve underlies [Jackson's] feelings". Blender stated that the song was "one of the most sonically eccentric, psychologically fraught, downright bizarre things ever to land on Top 40 radio". They added that it was "frighteningly stark, with a pulsing, cat-on-the-prowl bass figure, whip-crack downbeat and eerie multi-tracked vocals ricocheting in the vast spaces between keyboards and strings". Overall, the magazine described the track as "a five-minute-long nervous breakdown, set to a beat". Stylus said of the song, "It's one of the best representations of film noir in pop music, ending with no resolution except a single mother and selfish, careless scumball." In a review of Thriller 25, AllMusic observed that "Billie Jean" was "startling" in its "futuristic funk". The track also won praise from Jackson biographers. Nelson George stated that Jerry Hey's string arrangement added danger to "Billie Jean", while J. Randy Taraborrelli added that it was "dark and sparse" by Quincy Jones' production standards.

At the 1984 Grammy Awards, "Billie Jean" earned Jackson two of a record eight awards: Best R&B Song and Best R&B Male Vocal Performance. It won the Billboard Music Award for favorite dance/disco 12" LP, and the magazine's 1980's poll named "Billie Jean" as the "Black Single of the Decade". The American Music Awards recognized the track as the Favorite Pop/Rock Single, while Cash Box honored the song with the awards for Top Pop Single and Top Black Single. The track was recognized with the Top International Single award by the Canadian Black Music Awards and awarded the Black Gold Award for Single of the Year. "Billie Jean" has also been awarded for its sales. It won the National Association of Recording Merchandisers Gift of Music award for best-selling single in 1984. By 1989, the standard format single was certified platinum by the Recording Industry Association of America, for shipments of at least one million units. The digital sales of "Billie Jean" were certified gold in 2005, for shipments of at least 500,000 units. In May 2014, a viral video of a high school-aged teenager imitating Jackson's Motown 25 performance of the song helped the song re-enter the Billboard Hot 100 at number 14, with 95% of its chart points credited to streams of the song following the popularity of viral video. On August 29, 2022, the digital sales of "Billie Jean" were certified Diamond in US.

== Music video ==
Jackson landing on his toes and illuminating a tile in the music video for "Billie Jean"

MTV initially refused to air the video for "Billie Jean", as the network's executives felt black music did not fit into its "rock"-centered programming at the time. Enraged by their refusal despite Jackson's success as a musical artist, Walter Yetnikoff, the president of Jackson's record company CBS Records, threatened to expose MTV's stance on racial discrimination: "I said to MTV, 'I'm pulling everything we have off the air, all our product. I'm not going to give you any more videos. And I'm going to go public and fucking tell them about the fact you don't want to play music by a black guy.'" MTV relented and premiered the "Billie Jean" music video on March 10, 1983. After the video was aired in heavy rotation, Thriller went on to sell an additional 10 million copies. It was one of the first videos by a black artist to be aired regularly by the channel.

Directed by Steve Barron and produced by Gowers Fields Flattery, the video shows a photographer who follows but never catches Jackson, as when photographed Jackson fails to materialize on the developed picture. Jackson dances to Billie Jean's hotel room and as he walks along a sidewalk, each tile lights up at his touch. After performing a quick spin, he jumps and lands, freeze framed, on his toes. Upon arrival at the hotel, he climbs the staircase to Billie Jean's room, lighting up each step as he touches it and illuminating a burnt-out "Hotel" sign as he passes it. The paparazzo then arrives at the scene and watches as Jackson vanishes under the covers of Billie Jean's bed, before the police arrive and arrest him for spying on Billie Jean. As the paparazzo is led away, he drops a tiger-print cloth that Jackson had left behind after polishing his shoe with it earlier in the video. (On both occasions, the cloth briefly transforms into a tiger cub.) Once the street is empty, the paving tiles again light up in sequence, reversing Jackson's earlier progress.

Jackson's new look for the video, a black leather suit with a pink shirt and a red bow tie, was copied by children around the US. Imitation became so severe that, despite pupil protests, Bound Brook High School forbade students from wearing a single white glove like Jackson had on during the performance of "Billie Jean" at Motown 25: Yesterday, Today, Forever.

The short film was inducted into the Music Video Producers Hall of Fame in 1992. In a 2005 poll of 31 pop stars, video directors, agents, and journalists conducted by telecommunications company 3, the music video was ranked fifth in their "Top 20 Music Videos Ever". The video was also ranked as the 35th greatest music video in a list compiled by MTV and TV Guide at the millennium. On June 10, 2021, "Billie Jean" became the first 1980s clip by a solo artist to reach 1 billion views on YouTube.

== Motown 25 performance ==
Jackson performed "Billie Jean" on the television special Motown 25: Yesterday, Today, Forever, broadcast on May 15, 1983. The special was recorded on March 25 as a celebration of Motown Records' twenty-fifth anniversary (Motown was launched in 1959). The event featured many popular Motown acts, past and present. Jackson initially refused an invitation to reunite with the Jackson 5 for a performance, but reconsidered after a visit from Motown founder Berry Gordy, whom Jackson respected. Jackson asked to also perform "Billie Jean", which ended up being the only non-Motown song on the show, to which Gordy agreed. Following performances by Marvin Gaye, Smokey Robinson, and Mary Wells, the Jacksons sang a medley of their early 1970s hits. Jermaine Jackson was on stage with the group, marking the first time that the original Jackson 5 lineup had performed together since they left Motown in 1975. After the group performed "I'll Be There", they left Michael alone on stage.

Jackson wore black high-water pants, leather penny loafers, crystal-laden white socks, a black sequined jacket, and a single white rhinestone glove. He addressed the audience, and then "Billie Jean" started playing. (Jackson lip-synced the entire song, because organizers feared that the evening's backing band could not replicate the sound of the recording.) To begin his performance, Jackson snapped a fedora to his head and struck a pose—his right hand on his hat and his left leg bent. During the song's instrumental interlude, he executed a move that many believe sealed his status as a pop icon. Jackson glided backwards to perform the moonwalk, before he spun on his heels and landed en pointe. It was the first time Jackson had performed the moonwalk in public; he had practiced it in his kitchen prior to the show.

Many, including Jackson biographer Steve Knopper, have speculated that Jackson's "Billie Jean" costuming and choreography were specifically inspired by a dance routine performed by Bob Fosse in the 1974 musical film The Little Prince. In that film, Fosse, playing "The Snake", sings the song "A Snake in the Grass" and performs an accompanying dance that Fosse himself choreographed. The dance includes a variety of techniques that seemed to be echoed in Jackson's routine, including trademark Fosse elements such as hip thrusts, bent knees, shoulder isolations, jazz hands and kicks, as well as a brief moonwalk. Jackson openly acknowledged Fosse as a dance influence, having told Fosse himself that he had amassed a complete home collection of Fosse's choreography work in film and television, which he watched frequently.

Motown 25: Yesterday, Today, Forever was watched by 50 million people and Jackson's routine earned him an Emmy nomination. With the performance, Jackson reached a new audience and increased the sales of Thriller, which eventually became the best-selling album of all-time. The day after the show aired, Jackson was called by his childhood idol Fred Astaire, who commended him. Another childhood idol, Sammy Davis Jr., had admired Jackson's black sequined jacket during the performance and later received it as a gift.

Jackson stated at the time that he was disappointed in his performance; he had wanted to remain on his toes longer than he had. Jackson subsequently said that "Billie Jean" was one of his favorite songs to perform live, but only when he did not have to do it the way he had on Motown 25: Yesterday, Today, Forever. "The audience wants a certain thing—I have to do the moonwalk in that spot," he later said. "I'd like to do a different version."

In a Top 100 list compiled by VH1 and Entertainment Weekly in 2000, Jackson's performance was ranked as the sixth greatest rock 'n' roll TV moment. Five years later, Entertainment Weekly named Jackson's Motown 25 performance as one of the most important pop culture moments in history. "It was a moment that crossed over in a way that no live musical performance ever had. There was a messianic quality to it", Entertainment Weekly editor Steve Daly commented. David Moynihan of NME wrote in 2009 that "Jackson's status as the world's biggest superstar was confirmed" by the Motown 25 performance.

== Pepsi commercials ==
In 1984, Pepsi sponsored the Jacksons' Victory Tour. In return, Michael and his brothers were to star in two commercials for the company. Jackson had reworked "Billie Jean" for the commercial and titled it "Pepsi Generation". The song was used as the official jingle for the commercials and released as a 7-inch promo single. The launch of "The Choice of a New Generation" campaign in February 1984 was attended by 1,600 people who were issued with a programme and the 7-inch single. During the filming of the second commercial, a firework in the rear of the set was prematurely detonated, setting Jackson's hair ablaze. The incident necessitated reconstructive surgery. The commercials were premiered at the Grammy Awards, the same night he collected a record eight awards.

== "Billie Jean 2008" ==
"Billie Jean 2008 (Kanye West Mix)"

Song by Michael Jackson and Kanye West

from the album Thriller 25
- Released: February 8, 2008
- Length: 4:35
- Songwriter: Michael Jackson
- Producers: Michael Jackson; Kanye West; Anthony Kilhoffer

Jackson's original version of "Billie Jean" was remixed by rapper Kanye West for Thriller 25, a 25th anniversary reissue of Jackson's Thriller. Titled "Billie Jean 2008", the remix garnered a mixed reception; most critics felt that it was impossible to improve upon the original. Pitchfork Media's Tom Ewing stated that the remix would have benefited from a guest verse by West, which "might have added dynamics to the mix's clumsy claustrophobia".

Mike Joseph, in a review of Thriller 25 for PopMatters, described the track listing of the reissue as "pleasant" but that West's "lazy" remix was the only exception. He added, "You've been given the opportunity to remix the most iconic single from one of the most iconic albums of all time, and all you can do is stick a drum machine on top of the song's original arrangement?". Rob Sheffield of Rolling Stone disliked the removal of the original bassline, and compared it to "putting Bobby Orr on the ice without a hockey stick". IGN's Todd Gilchrist praised West's remix and stated that it was a "pretty great track". He added, "it almost overplays the track's originally understated drama, his additions enhance the song and demonstrate that in a contemporary context."

== Legacy ==
"Billie Jean" aided Thriller in becoming the biggest selling album of all time. The song is recognized as one of the most cherished in history.

It was popularly believed that "Billie Jean" was an autobiographical song, referring to someone who claimed Jackson was the father of her child. Based on this theory, Lydia Murdock wrote the song "Superstar", which was a minor hit in 1983, intending this song as a criticism of Jackson's purported denial of paternity. Another song referred to as an "answer song" was a rap song by T-Ski Valley. The song "Valley Style" was actually reviewed by James Hamilton in the 30 July issue of Record Mirror. He referred to both Lydia Murdock's and T-Ski Valley's recordings as answer versions to "Billie Jean" but with a question mark for T-Ski Valley's rap version.

On his Late Night program in the 1980s, host David Letterman often played a recording of a song with the word "chair" replacing "kid" to create the mondegreen "the chair is not my son".

Frequently listed in magazine polls of the best songs ever made, "Billie Jean" was named the greatest dance record of all time by BBC Radio 2 listeners. In a list compiled by Rolling Stone and MTV in 2000, the song was ranked as the sixth greatest pop song since 1963.

Rolling Stone placed the song at number 58 on its list of The 500 Greatest Songs of All Time in 2004. In the 2021 update of the list it had risen to 44. "Billie Jean" was voted number 2 in The Nation's Favourite Number 1 Single, a British TV program airing on ITV on 21 July 2012. In a similar poll in 2015 the song was voted by the British public as the nation's second favorite 1980s number one.

In an interview, Pharrell Williams stated that "Billie Jean" was one of his favorite songs. "It is hard to say if there is a greater song than 'Billie Jean'. I think there will never be a song like this one again, with this bassline, with this kind of effect, this eternalness, this perfection." When re-released as part of the Visionary campaign in 2006, "Billie Jean" charted at No. 11 in the UK. It remained on the chart for over forty weeks and was the most successful reissue by a large margin. According to Thriller 25: The Book (2008), "Billie Jean" was still in heavy rotation a quarter-century after its release; it was receiving more than 250,000 spins per week in clubs around the world.

== Track listings ==
7-inch single (Epic EPCA 3084 (CBS))

1. "Billie Jean" – 4:55
2. "It's the Falling in Love" – 3:46

7-inch single (Epic 15-06453)

1. "Billie Jean" – 4:50
2. "Beat It" – 4:11

12-inch maxi (Epic 12-3084)

1. "Billie Jean" – 6:20
2. "Billie Jean" (instrumental) – 6:20

== Personnel ==
Credits adapted from Blender and the album Thriller 25.

- Michael Jackson – lead and backing vocals, songwriting, arrangements
- Bill Wolfer – Yamaha CS-80, synthesizer programming
- Greg Phillinganes – Rhodes electric piano, synth bass
- Greg Smith – DK Synergy
- Michael Boddicker – E-mu Emulator
- David Williams – guitar
- Louis Johnson – bass
- Leon "Ndugu" Chancler – drums
- Tom Scott – Lyricon
- Jerry Hey – string arrangements
- Jeremy Lubbock – string conductor
- Bruce Swedien – mixing, engineer

== Charts ==
=== Weekly charts ===
Weekly chart performance
Chart (1983)	Peak position
Australia (Kent Music Report)	1
Austria (Ö3 Austria Top 40)	2
Belgium (Ultratop 50 Flanders)	1
Canada (The Record)	1
Canada Top Singles (RPM)	1
Europe (Eurochart Hot 100)	1
Finland (Suomen virallinen singlelista)	2
Finland Jukebox (Suomen virallinen singlelista)	2
France (IFOP)	1
Germany (GfK)	2
Iceland (Íslenski Listinn)	1
Ireland (IRMA)	1
Italy (Musica e Dischi)	1
Jamaica (The Gleaner)	8
Netherlands (Dutch Top 40)	2
Netherlands (Single Top 100)	4
New Zealand (Recorded Music NZ)	2
Norway (VG-lista)	6
South Africa (Springbok Radio)	2
Spain (AFYVE)	1
Sweden (Sverigetopplistan)	2
Switzerland (Schweizer Hitparade)	1
UK Singles (Official Charts)	1
US Billboard Hot 100	1
US Billboard Hot Black Singles	1
US Cash Box Top 100	1
Zimbabwe	3
Chart (2006–2026)	Peak position
Argentina Hot 100 (Billboard)	28
Australia (ARIA)	7
Austria (Ö3 Austria Top 40)	3
Austria Airplay (MusicTrace)	43
Belgium (Back Catalogue Singles Flanders)	1
Belgium (Ultratop 50 Wallonia)	38
Bolivia (Billboard)	3
Brazil Hot 100 (Billboard)	21
Canada (Hot Canadian Digital Singles)	6
Chile (Billboard)	7
Colombia Hot 100 (Billboard)	29
Colombia Streaming (Promúsica)	17
Costa Rica Streaming (FONOTICA)	11
Croatia International Airplay (Top lista)	25
Czech Republic Singles Digital (ČNS IFPI)	14
Denmark (Tracklisten)	8
Ecuador Streaming (Promúsica)	1
Europe (Eurochart Hot 100)	9
Finland (Suomen virallinen lista)	11
France (SNEP)	5
France Download (SNEP)	1
Germany (GfK)	5
Global 200 (Billboard)	1
Greece International (IFPI)	2
Iceland (Billboard)	3
Ireland (IRMA)	2
Israel (Mako Hitlist)	46
Italy (FIMI)	3
Japan Hot 100 (Billboard)	29
Kazakhstan Airplay (TopHit)	70
Latvia Airplay (LaIPA)	10
Latvia Streaming (LaIPA)	7
Lithuania (AGATA)	9
Lithuania Airplay (TopHit)	3
Luxembourg (Billboard)	2
Malaysia (IFPI)	17
Malaysia International (RIM)	10
Mexico (Billboard)	18
Middle East and North Africa (IFPI)	1
Netherlands (Dutch Top 40)	3
Netherlands (Single Top 100)	3
New Zealand (Recorded Music NZ)	4
North Africa (IFPI)	14
Norway (VG-lista)	5
Panama Streaming (PRODUCE)	18
Peru Streaming (Promúsica)	4
Poland (Polish Airplay Top 100)	49
Poland (Polish Streaming Top 100)	28
Portugal (AFP)	4
Romania (Billboard)	12
Russia Streaming (TopHit)	21
Saudi Arabia (IFPI)	5
Singapore (RIAS)	23
Slovakia Singles Digital (ČNS IFPI)	6
South Africa Streaming (TOSAC)	82
Spain (Promusicae)	1
Sweden (Sverigetopplistan)	3
Switzerland (Schweizer Hitparade)	2
Turkey (Türkiye Top 20)	9
United Arab Emirates (IFPI)	1
UK Singles (Official Charts)	3
US Billboard Hot 100	14
US Billboard Hot Digital Songs	4
US Hot R&B/Hip-Hop Songs (Billboard)	3

=== Monthly charts ===
Monthly chart performance
Chart (2025–2026)	Position
Brazil Streaming (Pro-Música Brasil)	19
Lithuania Airplay (TopHit)	9
Russia Streaming (TopHit)	24

=== Year-end charts ===
Year-end chart performance
Chart (1983)	Position
Australia (Kent Music Report)	4
Austria (Ö3 Austria Top 40)	9
Belgium (Ultratop 50 Flanders)	4
Brazil (Brazilian Radio Airplay)	2
Canada Top Singles (RPM)	9
France (IFOP)	6
Germany (Official German Charts)	11
Netherlands (Dutch Top 40)	12
Netherlands (Single Top 100)	13
New Zealand (Recorded Music NZ)	9
South Africa (Springbok Radio)	15
Switzerland (Schweizer Hitparade)	7
UK (Official Charts Company)	8
US Billboard Hot 100	2
US Billboard Hot Black Singles	2
US Cash Box Top 100	3
Chart (2009)	Position
Netherlands (Dutch Top 40)	85
Netherlands (Single Top 100)	56
Sweden (Sverigetopplistan)	39
Switzerland (Schweizer Hitparade)	62
UK Singles (OCC)	178
Chart (2022)	Position
Global 200 (Billboard)	197
Chart (2023)	Position
Kazakhstan Airplay (TopHit)	197
Chart (2024)	Position
Global 200 (Billboard)	184
Kazakhstan Airplay (TopHit)	148
Chart (2025)	Position
Global 200 (Billboard)	99

=== Decade-end charts ===
Decade-end chart performance for "Billie Jean"
Chart (1980–1989)	Rank
US Billboard Hot 100	18

=== All-time charts ===
All-time chart performance
Chart (1958–2021)	Position
US Billboard Hot 100	95

== Certifications ==
Certifications
Region	Certification	Certified units/sales
Australia (ARIA)	9× Platinum	630,000^{‡}
Austria (IFPI Austria)	Platinum	100,000^{*}
Canada (Music Canada)	Diamond	800,000^{‡}
Denmark (IFPI Danmark)	4× Platinum	360,000^{‡}
France (SNEP)	Platinum	1,000,000^{*}
Germany (BVMI)	2× Platinum	1,200,000^{‡}
Italy (FIMI)	2× Platinum	140,000^{‡}
Japan (RIAJ) digital	Gold	100,000^{*}
Mexico (AMPROFON)	4× Diamond	1,200,000^{‡}
New Zealand (RMNZ)	8× Platinum	240,000^{‡}
Portugal (AFP)	3× Platinum	75,000^{‡}
Spain (Promusicae) Digital sales through 2014	Gold	20,000^{*}
Spain (Promusicae) Sales + streams since 2015	4× Platinum	400,000^{‡}
United Kingdom (BPI) Digital sales	6× Platinum	3,600,000^{‡}
United States (RIAA)	Diamond	10,000,000^{‡}
Streaming
Greece (IFPI Greece)	3× Platinum	6,000,000^{†}
Ringtone
Japan (RIAJ) Full-length ringtone	Gold	100,000^{*}
United States (RIAA) Mastertone	Gold	500,000^{*}
^{*} Sales figures based on certification alone.^{‡} Sales+streaming figures based on certification alone.^{†} Streaming-only figures based on certification alone.

== The Bates version ==
"Billie Jean"

Single by the Bates

from the album Pleasure + Pain
- Released: 1995
- Length: 4:25
- Label: Virgin
- Songwriter: Michael Jackson
- Producers: The Bates; Andi Jung

The Bates singles chronology
"A Real Cool Time" (1995)	"Billie Jean" (1995)	"Say It Isn't So" (1995)

In 1995, German band the Bates covered "Billie Jean" on their album Pleasure + Pain.

=== Track listing ===
Maxi-CD

1. "Billie Jean" – 4:25
2. "Tonight" (remix) – 3:45
3. "Love Is Dead" (Part II) – 3:22
4. "Yeah" (acoustic version) – 1:06

=== Charts ===
Chart performance for "Billie Jean" by the Bates
Chart (1995–1996)	Peak position
Australia (ARIA)	68
Austria (Ö3 Austria Top 40)	40
Germany (GfK)	21
Switzerland (Schweizer Hitparade)	10
UK Singles (Official Charts)	67

== The Sound Bluntz version ==
"Billie Jean"

Single by the Sound Bluntz
- Released: 2002
- Label: Kontor
- Songwriter: Michael Jackson
- Producer: Cory Cash

Canadian group the Sound Bluntz also recorded a cover which peaked at No. 17 on the Australian charts during March 2003. It also reached No. 17 in Belgium, No. 14 in Finland, and No. 53 in the Netherlands.

=== Track listing ===
CD-Maxi Kontor 14305-5 (Edel)

1. "Billie Jean" (Beat Radio Mix) – 4:00
2. "Billie Jean" (Beat Clubb Mix) – 6:50
3. "Billie Jean" (Full Effect Mix) – 7:34
4. "Dura Dura" (Reprise) – 1:36

=== Charts ===
Chart performance for "Billie Jean" by the Sound Bluntz
Chart (2002–2003)	Peak position
Australia (ARIA)	17
Belgium (Ultratop 50 Flanders)	17
Belgium (Ultratop 50 Wallonia)	24
Finland (Suomen virallinen lista)	14
Germany (GfK)	74
Netherlands (Single Top 100)	53
Switzerland (Schweizer Hitparade)	93
UK Singles (Official Charts)	32

== Other cover versions ==
English musician Ian Brown took "Billie Jean" to number 5 on the UK charts in 2000. It was the B-side of "Dolphins Were Monkeys". Brown said, "I love Jackson. I want to do a Jackson EP with 'Thriller', 'Beat It', 'Billie Jean' and 'Rockin' Robin' or 'ABC' on it. Hopefully I'll get it done". Brown later covered "Thriller" on Golden Gaze, from his second solo album, Golden Greats.

American rock musician Chris Cornell recorded "Billie Jean" for his Carry On album in 2007. This version maintained the lyrics and basic melody, but radically rearranged the song with a slower acoustic interpretation influenced by country and blues. Cornell said: "I didn't plan on it. It just sort of happened organically. I changed the music quite a bit, I didn't touch the lyrics." He added, "And it's not a joke. I took a completely different approach to it, musically." Cornell had previously performed the song live in Europe, including an acoustic set in Stockholm, Sweden in September 2006. He later said, "I was getting ready to do some acoustic shows on a promotional tour for Revelations and I just wanted to have fun with it." The cover received favorable reviews from critics. MTV noted the "bluesier, more pained and impassioned feel" which stripped away "any pop elements of the original". Los Angeles Times described the track as "a grim, spooky take" on Jackson's "Billie Jean", and added that it was "amusing enough, even if it sounds a lot more like Metallica's 'Nothing Else Matters'". The newspaper concluded that "Jacko's mega hit [survived] the stunt translation". In 2008, Cornell's version was performed live by David Cook on the seventh season of American Idol, and this version charted on Billboard's Hot 100 at No. 47.

In 2011, Fall Out Boy frontman Patrick Stump covered the song as part of an a cappella medley of Michael Jackson songs, in which he sang all the parts.

In 2015, Irish musician EDEN released a remix of "Billie Jean" then separately released a cover of the song with his own vocals.

In 2022, a clip from the HBO sports documentary series Hard Knocks went viral, where Detroit Lions defensive end Aidan Hutchinson sang the song in front of the team as part of a rookie talent show.

The London Vegetable Orchestra has covered the song, under the title 'Billie Auber-Jean'.

== Mashups and remixes ==
In 1983, Italian studio group Club House recorded what would now be known as a mashup of "Billie Jean" and the 1972 Steely Dan song "Do It Again", titled "Do It Again Medley with Billie Jean". The song was a top ten hit in Belgium, Ireland and the Netherlands. American band Slingshot recorded a note-for-note remake of the song later that same year; this version hit number one on the Billboard Dance/Disco charts.

Also in 1983, italo disco group Pink Project recorded a mashup of "Billie Jean" with The Greg Kihn Band's hit "Jeopardy" that went to No. 10 on the Italian charts.

A DJ named Linx created a mashup of "Billie Jean" and the 1987 Eric B. & Rakim song "I Know You Got Soul" from the original recordings, releasing it in 1997 as "Billie Jean (Got Soul)". This mashup peaked at number 34 in Sweden.

2manyDJs included a mashup of "Billie Jean", Soulwax's "Saturday" and The Residents' "Kaw-Liga" in their mix album As Heard On Radio Soulwax Pt. 2.

Scottish bhangra group Tigerstyle's song "Nachna Onda Nei" includes the backing tracks of both "Billie Jean" and "Under Pressure" by Queen and David Bowie, with new vocals by Kaka Bhaniawala. In April 2008, dance act Signature used "Nachna Onda Nei" on Britain's Got Talent in their audition and again in their final performance.

== Official remixes ==
- Album and single version - 4:57
- Reissue of album and single version - 4:52 (fades out early)
- 12-inch version / long version - 6:23
- Four on the Floor Remix AKA 1992 Club Remix by Georgie Porgie - 6:28<
- Four on the Floor Remix Radio Edit - 4:43
- Underground Mix - 6:40
- Billie Jean 2008 (Kanye West Mix) - 4:37
- Home Demo from 1981 - 2:21
- Denniz PoP Swemix Version - 8:32
- Offer Nissim Remix '08 - 6:39
- Norty Cotto Remix - 8:46
- Love to Infinity Piano Anthem Radio Mix - 4:48
- Love to Infinity Piano Anthem DMC Remix - 7:37

== See also ==
- List of best-selling singles
- List of best-selling singles in Canada
- List of best-selling singles in France
- List of best-selling singles in Germany
- List of best-selling singles in Mexico
- List of best-selling singles in Spain
- List of highest-certified digital singles in the United States
- List of number-one singles in Australia during the 1980s
- List of Billboard Hot 100 number-singles of 1983
- List of Cash Box Top 100 number-one singles of 1983
- List of number-one singles of 1983 (Canada)
- List of European number-one hits of 1983
- List of number-one singles of 1983 (France)
- List of number-one singles of 1983 (Ireland)
- List of number-one hits of 1983 (Italy)
- List of number-one R&B singles of 1983 (U.S.)
- List of number-one singles of 1983 (Spain)
- List of number-one singles of the 1980s (Switzerland)
- List of UK Singles Chart number ones of the 1980s

== Bibliography ==
- Campbell, Lisa (1993). Michael Jackson: The King of Pop. Branden. ISBN 0-8283-1957-X.
- George, Nelson (2004). Michael Jackson: The Ultimate Collection (booklet). Sony BMG.
- Halstead, Craig; Cadman, Chris (2003). Jacksons Number Ones. Authors OnLine. ISBN 978-0-7552-0098-6.
- Halstead, Craig (2007). Michael Jackson: For the Record. Authors OnLine. ISBN 978-0-7552-0267-6.
- Jackson, Michael (1988). Moon Walk. Doubleday. ISBN 0-385-24712-5.
- Taraborrelli, J. Randy (2004). The Magic and the Madness. Headline. ISBN 0-330-42005-4.
- Thriller 25: The Book. ML Publishing Group. 2008. ISBN 978-0-97688919-9.
- Wadhams, Wayne (2001). Inside the Hits. Berklee Press. ISBN 0-634-01430-7.
