= Boom Boom (Let's Go Back to My Room) =

1987 single by Paul Lekakis

Single by Paul Lekakis

from the album Tattoo It
- B-side: "Instrumental Room"
- Released: 1987
- Genre: Hi-NRG
- Length: 3:54 (radio edit); 7:16 (US remix)
- Label: ZYX
- Songwriters: Miki Chieregato; Riccardo Ballerini; Roberto Turatti; Stefano Montin; Tom Hooker
- Producers: Miki Chieregato; Roberto Turatti; Ric Wake

Paul Lekakis singles chronology
"Boom Boom (Let's Go Back to My Room)" (1987)	"You Blow Me Away" (1989)

"Boom Boom (Let's Go Back to My Room)" is a song by American singer and model Paul Lekakis. Released as his debut single in 1987 through ZYX Records, the song peaked at number 43 on the US Billboard Hot 100, number six on the Billboard 12-inch Singles Sales chart, and number 60 on the UK Singles Chart. The single fared better in other parts of the world, staying at number one for five weeks on the Australian Music Report and for three weeks on South Africa's Springbok Radio chart. It also peaked at number four in Canada and number seven in New Zealand.

In 1990 the song was included on Lekakis' first album, Tattoo It, which was released on Sire Records. Subsequent remixes have appeared on the US dance chart. The song is popular in the LGBT community and helped to establish his career, both as a singer and as an actor. In 2009, VH1 ranked "Boom Boom" number 83 on its program 100 Greatest One Hit Wonders of the 80s.

== Reception ==
In his book In Pista!, Italian writer Rocco Bargioni describes the song as “a hit even before it was released,” noting that it was created by producers who were already very famous and established, with “suggestive and risqué lyrics.” He also notes that the song is “the second most successful Italo disco song of all time on the Billboard Hot 100.”

== Remixes ==
"Boom Boom" has since been re-released and remixed on multiple occasions. In 2007, a music video was also released to celebrate the 20th anniversary of the original single.

In an interview conducted by Ben Patrick Johnson, from his video blog Life on the Left Coast, Lekakis stated that the 2007 version is the first in which he participated in the remix process, including re-recording his vocals, there is one slight lyrical difference between the 2007 remix and the original song: instead of "...coming back to my room for a little boom boom", the lyrics in the more recent version are "...coming back to my room for another boom boom".

== Promotion ==
Lekakis lip synced the song on various programs, some of which have been shown on YouTube. In addition, Lekakis appeared in an episode of an MTV program produced by Andy Warhol, Andy Warhol's Fifteen Minutes, singing the song in 1987.

== Charts ==
=== Weekly charts ===
Chart (1987)	Peak position
Australia (Australian Music Report)	1
Canada Top Singles (RPM)	4
New Zealand (Recorded Music NZ)	7
South Africa (Springbok Radio)	1
UK Singles (Official Charts)	60
US Billboard Hot 100	43
US 12-inch Singles Sales (Billboard)	6

Chart (2007)	Peak position
US Dance Club Play (Billboard) "Boom Boom... Remixed"	39

=== Year-end charts ===
Chart (1987)	Position
Australia (Australian Music Report)	9
Canada Top Singles (RPM)	26
South Africa (Springbok Radio)	14

== Certifications ==
Region	Certification	Certified units/sales
Canada (Music Canada)	Gold	50,000^{^}
^{^} Shipments figures based on certification alone.

== See also ==
- List of number-one singles in Australia during the 1980s
