= Club House (band) =

Italian EDM group (1983–1996)

- Origin: Italy
- Genres: Italo house; Italo disco; Eurodance
- Years active: 1983–1996
- Labels: ZYX; Discomagic; Atlantic
- Past members: Carl Fanini; Gianfranco Bortolotti; Hidalgo Serra; Silvio Pozzoli

Club House were an Italian Italo house band formed in Italy in 1983. The group consisted of Carl Fanini, Gianfranco Bortolotti, Hidalgo Serra, and Silvio Pozzoli.

== History ==
The group scored a hit in 1983 with a mashup medley of Steely Dan's "Do It Again" and Michael Jackson's "Billie Jean", titled "Do It Again Medley with Billie Jean". It reached No. 7 in Ireland, No. 11 in the UK and No. 75 on the U.S. Billboard Hot 100. The same two songs in Club House's 1983 medley were also recorded as a note-for-note dance medley by the Detroit, Michigan band Slingshot, which hit number-one on the dance chart with its cover version. There was a further version by Brooklyn Express, a New York studio project by Began Cekic and Eric Durham, also in 1983.

In 1987, Club House released another medley, mixing Mory Kanté's "Yé ké yé ké" with The Spencer Davis Group's "I'm a Man", a single licensed to Music Man Records in the UK, which became a small hit in 1989 peaking at number 69 in the British charts. In 1991, they hit number-one on the U.S. Hot Dance Music/Club Play chart with "Deep in My Heart", which used portions of Kier Kirby's vocals from Deee-Lite's 1990 single "Power of Love".

Club House's biggest hit on the UK Singles chart came in 1994, when their single "Light My Fire" (featuring Carl Fanini on vocals) was remixed by Bortolotti's Cappella project and put out as a single by Pete Waterman's PWL record label. Originally a number 45 hit in the UK, the new Cappella version peaked at number 7 in the UK Singles Chart in April 1994 (though the first mix is remembered as the tune the original six man line-up of Boyzone danced to on RTÉ's The Late Late Show after just being formed). The follow-up single, "Living in the Sunshine", was not quite so successful as it only managed number 21 in the UK in July the same year.

== Discography ==
=== Albums ===
- Nowhere Land (The Album) (1995)

=== Singles ===
Year	Single	Peak chart positions									Album
Year	Single	AUS	FIN	GER	IRE	NED	NZ	UK	US	US Dance	Album
1983	"Do It Again/Billie Jean (medley)"	—	—	41	7	10	33	11	75	—	Singles only
1983	"Superstition/Good Times (medley)"	—	—	—	—	—	—	59	—	—	Singles only
1987	"I'm a Man/Yeké Yeké (medley)"	—	—	—	—	—	—	69	—	—	Singles only
1989	"I'm Alone"	—	—	—	—	—	—	—	—	—	Singles only
1990	"Deep in My Heart"	—	—	—	—	41	—	55	—	1	Singles only
1991	"I'm Falling Too"	—	—	—	—	—	—	—	—	18	Singles only
1992	"Take Your Time"	—	—	—	—	—	—	—	—	—	Nowhere Land
1993	"Light My Fire" (featuring Carl)	67	—	—	19	—	—	45	—	—	Nowhere Land
1994	"Light My Fire" (remix)	26	20	—	11	—	—	7	—	—	Nowhere Land
1994	"Living in the Sunshine" (featuring Carl)	106	—	—	23	—	—	21	—	—	Nowhere Land
1994	"Nowhere Land" (featuring Carl)	—	—	—	—	—	—	56	—	—	Nowhere Land
1995	"All By Myself" (featuring Carl)	—	—	—	—	—	—	—	—	—	Nowhere Land
1996	"You and I"	—	—	—	—	—	—	—	—	—	Nowhere Land
1997	"World of Dreams"	—	—	—	—	—	—	—	—	—	Nowhere Land
"—" denotes releases that did not chart

== See also ==
- List of number-one dance singles of 1991 (U.S.)
