= Light My Fire (Club House song) =

1993 single by Club House

Single by Club House featuring Carl

from the album Nowhere Land (The Album)
- Released: 23 August 1993
- Genre: Italo house
- Label: Media; PWL Continental
- Songwriters: Antonio Puntillo; Carl Fanini; Gianfranco Bortolotti; Mauro Picotto
- Producer: Gianfranco Bortolotti

Club House singles chronology
"Take Your Time" (1992)	"Light My Fire" (1993)	"Living in the Sunshine" (1994)

Music video
- "Light My Fire" on YouTube

"Light My Fire" is a song by Italian musical group Club House, featuring Italian-American singer Carl Fanini, released as the second single from their debut and only album, Nowhere Land (The Album) (1995), in August 1993. It was co-written by a number of producers at Media Records, including Gianfranco Bortolotti and Mauro Picotto, a DJ who would go on to have a number of trance hits in the 2000s, such as "Lizard" and "Komodo".

== Releases ==
"Light My Fire" was first released as a single on 23 August 1993, charting at No. 45 on the United Kingdom and No. 19 in Ireland, where it is remembered as the record the original six man line-up of Boyzone danced to on RTÉ's The Late Late Show. A re-release the following year with new remixes by fellow Media Records act Cappella saw it reach No. 11 in Ireland, No. 13 in Israel, and No. 26 in Australia. In the United Kingdom, Media Records had licensed the single to Pete Waterman's PWL record label (as UK Media Records would not be launched for another couple of years), with the Cappella version becoming another top 10 hit for PWL, when it peaked at No. 7 on April 24, 1994. The single was also a hit in Scandinavia and the US. On the Eurochart Hot 100, "Light My Fire" debuted at No. 85, after charting in Belgium, Denmark, Ireland and the UK. It peaked six months later at No. 26.

== Critical reception ==
In August 1994, Larry Flick from Billboard magazine remarked that the song "has already wooed folks overseas". In his weekly UK chart commentary, James Masterton noted that it "has been filling floors up and down the country". Sarra Manning from Melody Maker felt it "is naff because the lyrics never progross beyond, Light my fire...burn baby, burn baby", adding, "Yet it touches a chord. [...] The chord that yearns to visit nice discotheques with carpets and cocktails where you take to the dancefloor with your spouse and grind your hips to the pounding PWL beat, glad that you no longer have to fend off stagedivers and pretend to like that noisy indie bollocks." Alan Jones from Music Week gave it a score of four out of five, describing it as a "happy Italian record in Erasure-go-house style, right down to the ersatz Andy Bell contralto." In 1993, James Hamilton from the Record Mirror Dance Update called it "catchy hey down dippy doo day-ah chanting reissued now much more timely smash bound scampering Italo Hi-NRG". In 1994, he deemed it an "infectious Italo Hi-NRG galloper".

== Track listings ==
- CD single, UK (PWL Continental, 1993)
1. "Light My Fire" (edit) – 3:32
2. "Light My Fire" (Noisy Clouds mix) – 4:55
3. "Light My Fire" (Storm in the Clouds mix) – 5:06
4. "Light My Fire" (X Club cut) – 6:12
5. "Light My Fire" (XX Club cut) – 5:24
6. "Light My Fire" (R.A.F. Track) – 1:59
- CD single - The Cappella Remixes, UK (PWL Records 1994)
1. "Light My Fire" (Cappella (R.A.F. Zone) remix edit) – 3:39
2. "Light My Fire" (Cappella (KM) remix) – 6:17
3. "Light My Fire" (Cappella (R.A.F. Zone) remix) – 6:07
4. "Light My Fire" (DJ Professor XX dub) – 6:29
5. "Light My Fire" (original 12-inch mix) – 4:54

== Charts ==
=== Weekly charts ===
Chart (1993–1994)	Peak position
Australia (ARIA)	26
Europe (Eurochart Hot 100)	26
Europe (European Dance Radio)	3
Finland (IFPI)	20
Ireland (IRMA)	11
Israel (Israeli Singles Chart)	13
Scotland (OCC)	9
UK Singles (OCC)	7
UK Dance (Music Week)	9
UK Dance (Music Week) Re-release	4
UK Club Chart (Music Week)	13
UK Club Chart (Music Week) Re-release	18

=== Year-end charts ===
Chart (1994)	Position
UK Singles Chart (OCC)	89

== Release history ==
Region	Date	Format(s)	Label(s)	Ref.
United Kingdom	23 August 1993	7-inch vinyl; 12-inch vinyl; CD; cassette	PWL Continental	
United Kingdom (re-release)	18 April 1994	12-inch vinyl; CD; cassette	PWL Continental	
