= Tom Hooker =

American singer and photographer

- Also known as: T. Beecher, Thomas Barbèy, Tam Harrow, Lou Sern
- Born: Thomas Beecher Hooker; November 18, 1957 (age 68); Greenwich, Connecticut, U.S.
- Origin: Los Angeles, California
- Genres: Pop, Italo disco, hi-NRG
- Occupations: Singer, actor, photographer
- Instrument: Vocals
- Years active: 1980–1994, 2010–present
- Labels: Full Time Records (1980–1984); Baby Records (1984–1995); BMG Records (1988–1995); MK Music (2010–2011)

Tom Hooker or Thomas Barbèy (born Thomas Beecher Hooker on November 18, 1957) is an American singer and fine art photographer. He was the voice and one of the songwriters behind most songs for popular Italo disco artist Den Harrow. The 2018 documentary Dons of Disco covers Hooker's involvement in the Den Harrow project.

== Early life ==
Barbèy, best known as Tom Hooker, was brought to Europe when he was six months old. At the age of ten, he started his musical career as a drummer. At 13, he created his first band. At 15, he first appeared in public at a concert as a drummer/singer. He studied languages in Switzerland.

== Music career ==
In 1980, he moved to Italy, where he was discovered by Italian producers. His first hit was "Flip Over", b/w the track "We Can Start It All Over Again". He had his first major success in 1986 with "Looking for Love".

=== Den Harrow ===
Starting in 1985, Hooker co-wrote and sang lead vocals on the first two Den Harrow albums, backing vocals on the third album and co-wrote many subsequent Den Harrow songs under the name T. Beecher. When Hooker was credited for vocals at all, it was only for background vocals, as it was the producer's intention to have the lip-synching model Stefano Zandri as the public face of the project.

In 2010, Tom Hooker recorded and published on YouTube a press conference-style video in which Hooker, flanked by Den Harrow co-producer Miki Chierigato, states and demonstrates that he was the vocalist on most of the Den Harrow records, and in which he accuses Stefano Zandri of continuing to publicly lip synch to those recordings. He also states that Zandri made threats and insults against Hooker and his family on Facebook for exposing the vocal inauthenticity of the Den Harrow recordings. Hooker asserts that Zandri no longer has permission to publicly lip sync to Den Harrow recordings that use Tom Hooker's voice.

=== Other music endeavors ===
His later work included collaborations with several other artists and producers, including Eddy Huntington, for whom he provided several lyrics and backing vocals, including those for the Europe-wide hit "U.S.S.R.".

In 1986 he took part in the project Fahrenheit 104, a band also composed of Maurizio Vandelli, Jane Hill and Dario Farina, with which he recorded the song Highway To Freedom, composed by Vince Tempera for the musical part and by Michael Kunze for the lyrics, also published as a single by Baby Records.

In 1987, he was one of the writers for the hit Boom Boom (Let's Go Back to My Room) by Paul Lekakis, which became #1 in Australia and #43 in US Billboard Hot 100 chart.

In the 90s he recorded some singles under the pseudonym David Harleyson, obtaining some commercial success in Thailand.

=== Revival ===
In October 2010, Hooker collaborated with his longtime musical colleague and fellow composer, Miki Chieregato, to produce and release a brand new single and video, "Change Your Mind". This collaboration marks the return to the roots of the same production team that was responsible for all of the initial Den Harrow and Tom Hooker output between 1985 and 1988. In 2011, Hooker released a new recording and music video of the Den Harrow track "Future Brain", which features himself.

Since 2014, Tom Hooker and Miki Chieregato have been issuing Den Harrow parody tracks under the name of Tam Harrow.

In 2017, he released the double CD Back in Time, 27 songs including the duet with Linda Jo Rizzo I Want You Tonight.

== Thomas Barbèy Photography ==
=== Beginnings as a photographer ===
While living in Milan, Hooker met a lot of people involved in the fashion world. He began dating a model and, in reviewing her portfolio, he "kept seeing the mistakes. Bad lighting, shadows, bags under the eyes". Simultaneously, he also began to notice "the important things like playing with light". So, he began taking photographs of his girlfriend. At first, photography was just a hobby and his primary income was from his music endeavors. Eventually, however, Hooker transitioned to professional work; he opened a studio and started doing magazine work.

Hooker's initial work was largely studio based and done in color with Kodak film; he made the occasional foray into black and white using Ilford film. He recalls going to the lab on a regular basis and it was there that he "started getting into black and white and experimenting with multiple enlargers".

Eventually, Hooker "realized that the fashion world was very political". Because he was more interested in focusing on the "creative side," he transitioned away from fashion/studio-based photography.

=== Move to the States and name change ===
In 1994, Hooker moved to America "to marry an American and start a family", and to "to re-invent [himself] as a photographer/artist", creating surreal photomontages. It was at this time that he changed his surname from Hooker to Barbèy, his mother's maiden name, because his wife did not want to be known as "Mrs. Hooker".

Barbèy started out largely selling his works in street fairs, eventually transitioning to gallery shows. Reflecting on his career at a later date, Barbèy concluded that street fairs are "the best school there is," and are the "best place for the artist [to] interact with the art collector".

Barbèy had his first exhibition in the United States. In a later interview, Barbèy remarked: "what I liked about the fine art world was that people looked at your work and they either liked it or didn't. Each individual decides whether or not to buy a piece. You can talk about it, you can explain the process, but you can't tell the guy, 'Buy my piece of art.'"

Barbèy sold both black and white and sepia toned versions of his photographs. The sepia prints were sold in limited editions, were numbered and signed, whereas the black and white prints were often unlimited and unsigned, designed to be a "more affordable product".

=== Technique ===
Barbèy used a Mamiya RB-68 and a number of Canon AE-1 cameras to create the raw materials for his photomontages. Then, rather than using any kind of software or editing program, he would use a variety of tools, including enlargers, scissors and/or an airbrush to cobble together multiple negatives and create his images. Barbèy would then re-shoot the montage to create a final print.

=== Influences and philosophy ===
Barbèy has cited the following artists as influences: René Magritte, M. C. Escher, Philippe Druillet, Sandro del Prete, Rob Gonsalves, Vladimir Kush and Octavio Ocampo. He has also indicated that his inspiration has come "more from painters than from photographers".

Barbèy considers the titles of his works to be integral to experiencing them fully, stating: "[the title] gives a different twist to the image. The titles are usually thought provoking, sometimes humorous. In some pieces the meaning I attach to the work would probably be lost without the title".

In 2005, when asked what advice he'd give to aspiring artists, Barbèy replied: "you have to have the courage to throw away any image that is not worthy. I have seen too many photographers who don't have that courage because of the almightly dollar...You have to keep saying, that photo is going to be linked to my name. Don't ruin your name just for a little money. I made mistakes in the music business that I won't make in the art business. I did a lot of commercial music and it taught me what not to do. I don't want to go there in the art world."

=== Retirement ===
Hooker/Barbèy is now retired as a photographer and is no longer selling prints.

== Personal life ==
He lives in Las Vegas with his wife Suzanne Berquist.

== Collections ==
Existing collections that contain photographs by Thomas Barbèy:

- Cape Cod Museum of Art
- New Britain Museum of American Art

== Discography ==
=== Albums ===
- 1986: Only One
- 1988: Bad Reputation
- 1992: Fighting for Our Love
- 2017: Chameleon
- 2017: Back in Time
- 2018: No Time to Say Goodbye
- 2020: Together (as Tom Hooker & Tam Harrow)

=== Albums as Tam Harrow ===
- 2015: Incredible Idiot
- 2020: Together (as Tom Hooker & Tam Harrow)

=== Singles ===
- 1980: "Flip Over"/"We Can Start It All Over Again"
- 1981: "Toccami"/"Go Today"
- 1981: "I Want to Love"
- 1982: "Dove Andiamo"/"Try Me"
- 1982: "With Your Body"
- 1983: "Come Back Home"
- 1984: "Give It to Me"
- 1984: "Indian Girl"/"Love Attack"
- 1984: "Real Men" (12")
- 1985: "Cry"/"Don't Forget (To Buy This Record)"
- 1986: "Help Me"
- 1986: "Looking for Love"
- 1986: "Swiss Boy" (under the pseudonym Lou Sern)
- 1986: "Help Me"
- 1987: "Atlantis" (12")
- 1988: "Feeling Okay" (12")
- 1988: "No More Heaven" (12")
- 1990: "Living in the Sunshine" (7")
- 1991: "Sex-O-Phone & Funk Guitar" (12")
- 1994: "Runaway" (12")
- 2010: "Change Your Mind"
- 2012: "No Elevation" (with Miki Chieregato)
- 2014: "Illusions/Nobody Loves Me"
- 2016: "Tell Me"
- 2016: "My Russian Lady Night"
- 2017: "I Want You Tonight" (with Linda Jo Rizzo)
- 2017: "King of the World"
- 2017: "Find a Way and a Time"
- 2017: "Rain" (with Miki Chieregato)
- 2020: "You and I" (with Tam Harrow)
- 2020: "With Our Love" (with Bad Boys Blue and Scarlett)

=== Singles as Tam Harrow ===
- 2014: "Idiot"
- 2014: "Incredible"
- 2014: "Kept Boy"
- 2014: "You DJ You Rock"
- 2014: "Fixation"
- 2015: "Vodka Kaboom"
- 2015: "Swiss Cows" (feat. Lou Sern)
- 2016: "Go to Mexico"
- 2018: "No Time to Say Goodbye"
- 2018: "Big Boys Don't Cry"
- 2019: "Dancing to the Night"
- 2020: "Your Love Is So Nice"
- 2020: "Latin Lover"

=== Collaborations ===
- 2021: "A Sailor from the Moon" (feat. Lord, Begüm Günceler)
- 2021: "In the Sign of Destiny" (feat. Lord, Peter Rafelson)
- 2021: "Keep on Rolling" (feat. Lord)

== Filmography ==
- Jocks (1983)
- Dons of Disco (2018)
