= Do It Again Medley with Billie Jean =

1983 single by Slingshot

Single by Club House
- Released: 1983
- Recorded: 1983
- Length: 7:30 (12 inch single) 4:08 (7 inch single edit)
- Label: Atlantic; Island
- Songwriters: Walter Becker; Donald Fagen; Michael Jackson

Club House singles chronology
"Do It Again Medley with Billie Jean" (1983)	"Superstition Medley with Good Times" (1983)

"Do It Again Medley with Billie Jean" is a song by the Italian music project Club House, released in 1983. The song combines elements of two hits made famous by other artists: "Do It Again", a 1973 top-ten hit by Steely Dan and Michael Jackson's number-one song from earlier in the year, "Billie Jean".

Songwriting credit on the track is given to Jackson as well as the primary members of Steely Dan, Walter Becker and Donald Fagen.

The song reached the Billboard Hot 100 at number 75, but was a much bigger hit in Belgium, Ireland, the Netherlands and the UK, where it peaked at 6, 7, 10 and 11 on their local charts, respectively.

== Charts ==
=== Weekly charts ===
Chart (1983)	Peak position
Australia (Kent Music Report)	79
Belgium (Ultratop 50 Flanders)	6
Germany (GfK)	41
Ireland (IRMA)	7
Netherlands (Dutch Top 40)	9
Netherlands (Single Top 100)	10
New Zealand (Recorded Music NZ)	33
UK Singles (Official Charts)	11

=== Year-end charts ===
Chart (1983)	Position
Belgium (Ultratop Flanders)	45
Netherlands (Dutch Top 40)	82

== Slingshot version ==
"Do It Again Medley with Billie Jean"

Single by Slingshot
- Released: 1983
- Recorded: 1983
- Length: 7:22
- Label: Quality
- Songwriters: Walter Becker; Donald Fagen; Michael Jackson

"Do It Again Medley with Billie Jean" was covered the same year by Detroit-based band Slingshot. It was their only song to reach the Billboard charts in the US, where it spent one week at number one on the Hot Dance Club Play chart in August 1983.

Chart (1983)	Peak position
US Billboard Hot Dance Club Play	1
US Billboard Hot Black Singles	25

== See also ==
- List of number-one dance singles of 1983 (U.S.)
