= Silver Pozzoli =

- Born: Silvio Pozzoli; 19 July 1953 (age 73); Cinisello Balsamo, Lombardy, Italy
- Occupations: Singer; songwriter; musician
- Years active: 1980–present
- Musical career
- Genres: Italo disco; dance
- Instruments: Vocals; guitar; keyboards
- Label: ZYX
- Formerly of: Club House

Silvio Pozzoli (born 19 July 1953), known by his stage name Silver Pozzoli, is an Italian singer, songwriter and musician.

== Career ==
Pozzoli was part of the Italian band Club House, who released several Italo house records such as "I'm a Man/Yeké Yeké Medley" and "Do It Again Medley with Billie Jean". Several of his singles were top 30 hits across Europe; "Around My Dream" (1985), "Step by Step" (1985) and "Mad Desire" as Den Harrow (1984).

In 1992, Pozzoli released the single "Sing Sing Sing Along (Around My Dream)", a remix of the original 1985 version, in Germany on the ZYX label. The Eurodance single "Don't Forget Me" was released in 1994 in Italy under PL and licensed in Germany under ZYX.

In 2005, Hot Steppaz remixed "Around My Dream"; the single was released in Germany on the Dance Street label. He sung the Italian opening of the anime Hunter × Hunter, composed by Giorgio Vanni.

== Discography ==
=== Albums ===
- Around My Dream (1987)

=== Singles ===
- 1984 - "Mad Desire" (performed vocals on this song of Den Harrow) - ITA #15
- 1985 - "Around My Dream" - FRA #21, GER #9, NL #21, SWI #25, BEL #20, SA #1
- 1985 - "Step by Step" - NL #18, BEL #19, SA #12
- 1986 - "Around My Dream" (Remix)
- 1986 - "From You to Me"
- 1987 - "Pretty Baby"
- 1987 - "Chica Boom"
- 1987 - "Cross My Heart" (Many Records)
- 1987 - "Take My Heart"
- 1988 - "Let Me Be Your Love" (co-written with David Lyme and released under the name Silver)
- 1988 - "Love Is the Best" (TIME Records)
- 1992 - "With or Without You"
- 1992 - "Sing Sing Sing Along" (ZYX)
- 1993 - "Around My Dream '93"
- 1994 - "Don't Forget Me" (ZYX)
