= I Will Always Love You (Whitney Houston recording) =

- US CD single

Single by Whitney Houston

from the album The Bodyguard: Original Soundtrack Album
- B-side: "Jesus Loves Me"; "Do You Hear What I Hear?"
- Released: November 2, 1992
- Recorded: April 22, 1992
- Studio: Ocean Way Recording (Los Angeles)
- Genre: Pop; soul; R&B
- Length: 4:31
- Label: Arista
- Songwriter: Dolly Parton
- Producer: David Foster

Whitney Houston singles chronology
"We Didn't Know" (1992)	"I Will Always Love You" (1992)	"I'm Every Woman" (1993)

Music video
- "I Will Always Love You" on YouTube

Audio sample
- file; help

"I Will Always Love You" is a song recorded by American singer Whitney Houston. It is a cover of the original song written and recorded by Dolly Parton, and was inspired by a version recorded by Linda Ronstadt. It was released on November 2, 1992, by Arista Records as the lead single from the soundtrack to The Bodyguard, Houston's film acting debut. Her version was produced by Canadian musician David Foster. The song was a global success, topping the singles charts in 34 countries. Considered one of the most famous and iconic songs of all time, it has sold over 24 million copies worldwide, making it the best-selling single by a female artist of all time as well as one of the best-selling singles of all time. It was also the world's best-selling single of 1992. The music video for "I Will Always Love You" is the first 20th century video by a solo act to reach 1 billion views on YouTube. As of October 2026, it has reached over 1.9 billion views, making it one of the most watched videos of all time. In September 2026, the song reached a billion streams on Spotify.

Houston won Record of the Year and Best Female Pop Vocal Performance at the 36th Annual Grammy Awards for the song. A live performance was included on the 1999 release Divas Live '99, and a 1994 performance of the song at Houston's acclaimed and history-making concert at Johannesburg, South Africa, where she became the first international artist to tour the region following the abolishing of apartheid and the presidency of Nelson Mandela, was included on the 2014 CD/DVD release of Whitney Houston Live: Her Greatest Performances.

Houston's version of the song appeared at number eight on NME's Greatest No 1 Singles in History list. It was included in the list of Songs of the Century by the Recording Industry Association of America (RIAA) and the National Endowment for the Arts. In 2004, Houston's version of "I Will Always Love You" placed at number 65 on AFI's 100 Years...100 Songs survey of top tunes in American cinema. It was also ranked at number 22 on The Guardian's list of Britain's favorite 100 songs, published in May 2002. In February 2014, the song placed at number six on Billboard's list of the Top 50 Love Songs of All Time. A year later, in 2015, Rod Couch ranked the song as the number one song of the rock era in his book, The Top 500 Songs of the Rock Era: 1955-2015. In addition, the song has been inducted into the Grammy Hall of Fame and was culturally preserved by the Library of Congress' National Recording Registry.

The single is cited as one of Houston's signature songs.

== Background ==
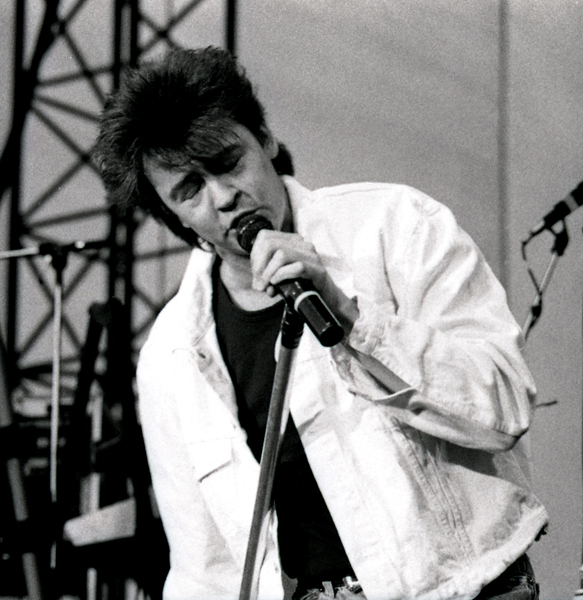
Though initially chosen for The Bodyguard, after British singer Paul Young recorded "What Becomes of the Brokenhearted" for another film, Houston and Costner dropped suggestions of recording it for the movie.

In April 1991, Houston announced that she was to co-star with Kevin Costner in a film titled The Bodyguard. The decision to do the film by Houston initially "didn't impress" Clive Davis, the head of Houston's record label Arista, describing the film's first draft of the script as a "pure thriller", later admitting that he was "nervous" of the film's aspects and what it would do for Houston's film career. Due to Houston's worldwide fame as a music superstar, Davis felt the idea of Houston doing the film "without really previously ever testing her acting chops... was speculative. It was risky. You don't come fully confident that she can do everything. And will the script be up to the mettle of somebody who would become the best-selling vocalist of all time?" Davis wrote a letter to the film's producers, which included Costner, where he told them of his concern of having Houston in the film without any music. The producers agreed with Davis and Houston, in a deal with the film's distributor, Warner Bros. Pictures, signed a deal for control of the soundtrack album and back royalties from each sale the album would make. Houston eventually agreed to record six songs, five of which would be prominently featured in scenes on the film. According to Canadian-American producer David Foster, he met Costner at the premiere of his 1990 film, Dances with Wolves and claimed Costner told him that he would be the right man to produce the soundtrack for the film.

Work on the soundtrack of the film began in Los Angeles that November, the same month where principal photography on the film took place. Between November 1991 and February 1992, in between filming the movie, Houston recorded four songs. The songs included the rock song "Queen of the Night", a song Houston herself co-wrote, a pop-soul rendition of the gospel hymn "Jesus Loves Me" and the pop ballads "Run to You" and "I Have Nothing", the latter two becoming Houston's first collaborations with Foster. For the fifth song, Houston, Costner and the film's music supervisor Maureen Crowe searched for the song they feel could be the "key moment in the plot" of the film. That March, it was suggested by Costner that they cover the Jimmy Ruffin soul ballad, "What Becomes of the Brokenhearted". Houston and Crowe, however, felt the Motown song was not appropriate to be performed at the end of the film.

When the actor suggested the song to be recorded in a slowed down arrangement, Crowe told The Telegraph in 2022 that the arrangement "was like a dirge: 'Happiness is just an illusion, filled with sadness and confusion...'", adding jokingly, "you wanna kill yourself at the end of it!" Houston reportedly told Foster that the song "[didn't] really fit [her]" and, Foster added, "didn't have the 'meat'... for her vocals in a final act song". Houston suggested, politely to Foster, to "try and make one more demo. And make it a little more... interesting?" After British singer Paul Young's rendition of the song from the soundtrack of the film, Fried Green Tomatoes (1991), reached the top 30 of the Billboard Hot 100 that month and became an inescapable radio hit, they agreed to search for another song. According to Crowe, she felt the song chosen had to "answer the question: what would you sing to somebody that you had an affair with, who had just taken a bullet for you and had saved your son's life, but you are going to go in completely separate directions after your brief affair, and you will probably never see him again? So, bittersweet memories. I always say when you're trying to find a song: what does the song have to do in the story? And if you ask enough questions, the song will present itself."

== Recording ==
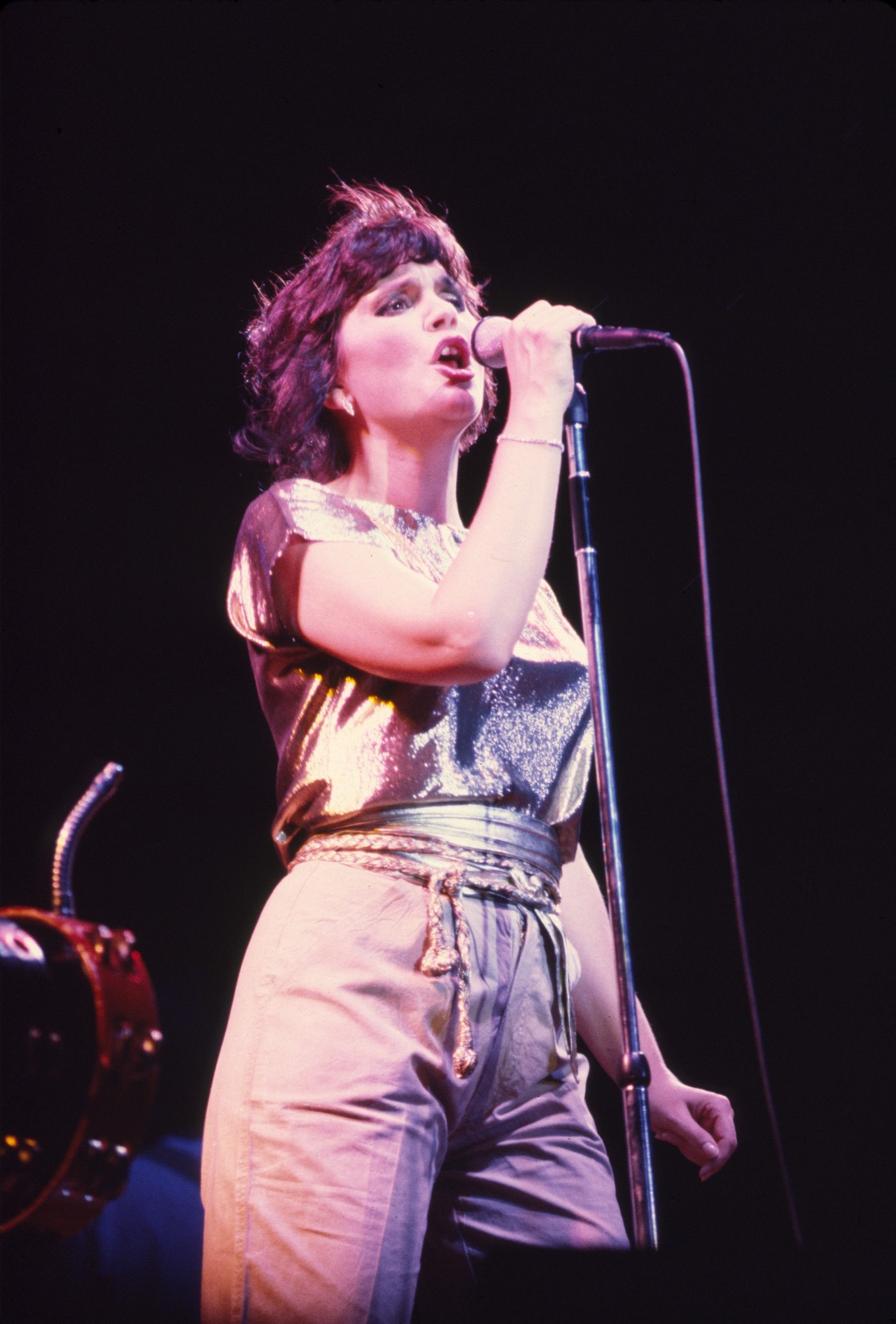
The inspiration behind the pick of "I Will Always Love You" for the soundtrack to The Bodyguard came from a 1975 rendition by American singer Linda Ronstadt.

Crowe later stated that she considered "California oldies", songs from artists such as the Eagles and Neil Young. Houston, who was the executive producer of the soundtrack, suggested an R&B song in Crowe's retelling of the script. Despite film producers being adamant of "not wanting country [music], because Hollywood has a feeling that country makes it something else", Crowe picked out California-based singer Linda Ronstadt's 1975 rendition of Dolly Parton's "I Will Always Love You", from her album, Prisoner in Disguise.

Costner, not a fan of the Ronstadt rendition, presented Parton's original to Houston, who initially wasn't sure of the song because it was a country ballad stating she "wouldn't buy it". The actor advised her to listen to the song again in a different way with her ears "and not the ears that's being played". Houston stated years later in 2000 that she cleared her trailer as she closed her eyes and played the song and mentioned that she finally got what Costner meant when it got to Parton's chorus. Afterwards, the singer agreed to record it.

There were two recordings of the song. The first was recorded live at the Fontainebleau in Miami Beach around March 1992 with Houston and members of her live band.

Costner suggested Houston sing the first verse a cappella. Though Foster told Costner and Houston that he thought the idea of starting the song a cappella was "ridiculous", he reluctantly agreed as he had ideas of adding strings and horns later in the song's studio recording. Costner later explained to Kelly Clarkson his reasoning behind the acapella intro with regard to the plot line of his and Houston's characters in the film: "Whitney was doing almost an apology moment at that point... And what better way to let someone know they really mean what they’re singing to you than when they say, 'I don’t even need to have music behind it. Let me sing to you what I feel about you.'" Though filmmakers already had a backing track for her to sing along to, Houston still suggested using members of her live band so "she could hold notes out to her liking and perform the ballad in a more organic way." The singer reportedly recorded the performance after midnight because, according to Foster, "she was filming all day. She was incredible. Like a laser beam. Like a racehorse – she would just step up to the microphone and go." According to Foster, Houston performed the song three times at the Fontainebleau.

Houston's mother Cissy later wrote that she cried as she witnessed Houston performing it in Miami. According to Foster, Cissy leaned to him and told him "you're witnessing greatness right now, I hope you know that." The song was actually heard twice in the film. Along with Houston's performance, a version sung by John Doe of the punk rock band X could be heard playing on a jukebox in the scene where Houston dances with Costner at a bar.

A studio recording commenced on April 22 at Ocean Way Recording in Los Angeles. Prior to recording, Foster was contacted by Parton over the recording after she had given executives the okay to use the song and the songwriter suggested Houston add the third verse from her original 1974 version. Parton stated because the third verse in her original version was a recitation, country radio programmers at the time chose not to play it, cutting it out to go straight into the final chorus. As a result, when the song was covered by Ronstadt and other singers, the recitation wasn't used. Parton suggested Houston to fully sing the third verse. According to Foster, Houston learned the third verse within several minutes of receiving it and added her own vocal arrangement to the verse.

Parton later recalled that Kevin Costner had also called her to give her okay on using the song. As she explained, "Kevin Costner and his secretary are the ones that loved the song. They had another song that was going to go in that place, and someone had recorded the song they were going to use. They were just in a panic at the last minute. And so they asked me about the song. I sent it. I didn’t hear anything more."

Again, like in the live Miami performances, Houston brought along her bandmates, namely musical director Rickey Minor, drummer Ricky Lawson, percussionist Bashiri Johnson and saxophonist Kirk Whalum, to record on the studio version in Los Angeles. Houston recorded two takes of the song at Ocean Way. Foster decided to keep the first take because it was "flawless and raw".

Houston reportedly kept most of the music of the soundtrack from Clive Davis until around July 1992, in which with help from her creative director Robyn Crawford, Houston sent the five tracks she recorded for the album, including "I Will Always Love You" in a DAT tape and CD on July 6, after Arista executives complained of not being able to hear the music. Upon receiving the music, Davis approved of its production and agreed on "I Will Always Love You" in particular, seeing the song's "full potential, lyrically and musically" and looked at it as "raw material. With the lyric, the music, with the potential arrangement, could it fulfill the potential of that scene? And the answer was yes."

According to Clive Davis, when he called Foster to tell him that he loved the song, Foster quickly retorted "don't get demo-itis! Don't fall in love! Because I'm gonna sweeten it, I'm gonna add strings and horns and do my thing!'," adding that after Foster kept submitting subsequent versions of the song that it "sounded slick". An alternate version of the song, later issued on the 2017 reissue of the soundtrack, I Wish You Love: More from The Bodyguard, featured a spoken word introduction by Houston and additional string and keyboard arrangements as well as rock guitars by Foster's own session musicians. Davis stated that the "raw purity of that first mix, with the a cappella [opening bars]... just haunted me. But David kept saying 'just wait, I'm not done yet,'", further adding that Foster's later mixes sounded "a little sweet". When Warner Bros. Pictures demanded a leading single to promote the film to be released immediately at the start of November, Davis made the decision to release the song as it was in the first version, called the "board mix" by Crowe and called the "first rough draft" by Davis himself. When Foster learned of Davis's plans to release the first version, he was initially angry and reportedly cursed at Davis. 24 hours later following the song's release, however, a more calmed down Foster called Davis back, apologizing and agreeing with the impresario, saying to him, "this is magic, thank you."

== Arrangement ==
Houston's rendition of "I Will Always Love You" is a plaintive R&B love ballad with pop, soul and gospel elements, arranged by Foster and Houston. The song starts off a cappella and remains that way for around 45 seconds until the chorus, in which by then, strings and keyboard flourishes are added in. The first verse and chorus are sung in a softer range by Houston while the second verse and chorus features restrained belting.

The song has an alto saxophone solo by Kirk Whalum and drumming from Ricky Lawson, including a one-note solo tom on the drum that leads to a key change and a final chorus, sung with Houston's full range.

The song then slows back down with Houston singing softer again and ends with a vocal soprano wail on the word "you", which Houston sustains for eleven seconds with her range going from F♯–B–D♯.

Sheet music for Houston's version of this song provided by Hal Leonard Music Publishing shows the key of A major and a 4/4 in common time with a tempo of "freely" at 66-68 beats per minute. After the acapella intro, the song follows a chord progression of A–F♯m–D_{7}–E–A–F♯m–C♯–Bm_{7}–A_{2}. Three minutes and thirty-one seconds later, it shifts to B major and the chord progression shifts to Bm–G♯–Em_{7}–F♯–B–G♯m–F♯–B2–D♯.

Houston's vocal range in the song goes from the low note of F♯_{3} to the high note of G♯_{5} while Foster's piano range in the song goes from the low note of C♯_{1} to the high note of D♯_{6}.

== Critical reception ==
Houston's rendition of "I Will Always Love You" received universal acclaim from music critics, being now regarded as one of her "signature'' songs. Larry Flick of Billboard magazine wrote that the song is "bolstered by a remarkably restrained (and ultimately effective) vocal by Houston. She builds to dramatic, heartfelt conclusion that makes sense, given the unusually slow-building created by producer David Foster." Randy Clark of Cashbox noted that "the unstoppable voice and unquestionable talent of Whitney Houston will no doubt come roaring back onto the charts with this cover". Amy Linden of Entertainment Weekly said it "is artistically satisfying and uncharacteristically hip for the MOR songbird." John Martinucci of Gavin Report asserted that Houston "delivers a powerful rendition that reminds us of her natural abilities as a singer with or without musical accompaniment." Stephen Holden of The New York Times called it a "magnificent rendition", commenting,

Houston transforms a plaintive country ballad into a towering pop-gospel assertion of lasting devotion to a departing lover. Her voice breaking and tensing, she treats the song as a series of emotional bursts in a steady climb toward a final full-out declamation. Along the way, her virtuosic gospel embellishments enhance the emotion and never seem merely ornamental.

Peter Stanton of Smash Hits commented, "A slow intro moulds into a crescendo of huggy-kissy-smoochiness that could melt the heart of the yeti of Northern Siberia." Writing for USA Today on November 17, 1992, James T. Jones IV labeled it a "tour-de-force", and added "[Houston] gives a 3 1/2-star [out of four] performance. Where Dolly Parton's original 'I Will Always Love You' was plaintive and tear-stained, Houston's is gospel-infused and dramatic."

The key change after the third verse drew much mention. Chris Willman of the Los Angeles Times commented that the singer "has the goods to deliver on the tune's haunting beauty and resists overpowering it – until the finale, when the key change and stratospheric notes drain all the heart-rending sadness out of the song and make it sound like just another anthem of survival." But more typical is this 2004 take in The Guardian, in which Glenn Waldron calls the modulation "all-conquering, all-powerful".

== Commercial performance ==
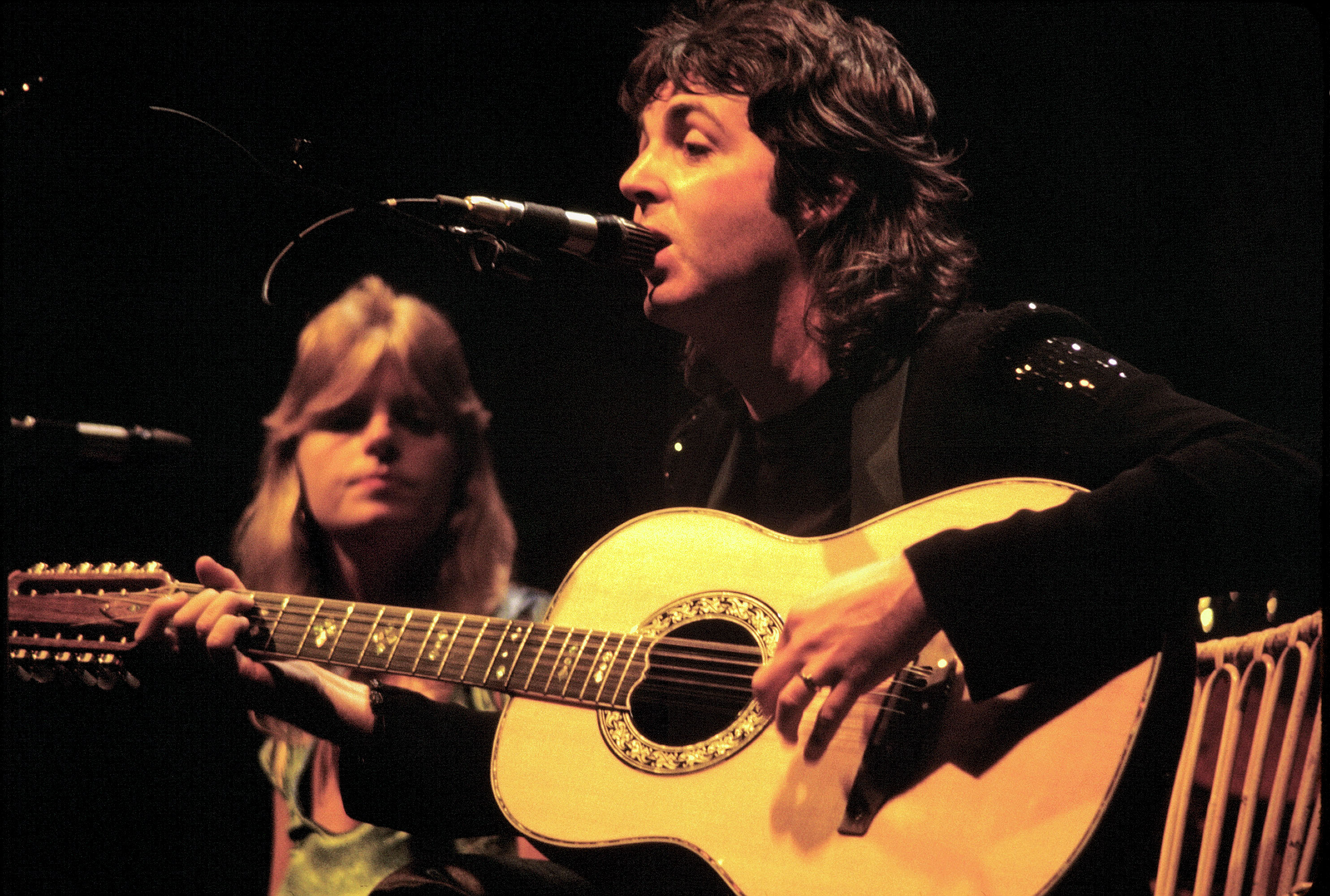
"I Will Always Love You" produced the fastest rise to number one on the Billboard Hot 100 since Paul and Linda McCartney's "Uncle Albert/Admiral Halsey" in 1971.

The song debuted at number 40 on the Billboard Hot 100 on November 14, 1992 becoming the "Hot Shot Debut" of the week,, rose to number 12 in its second week, and became Houston's tenth number-one song on November 28, unseating The Heights' "How Do You Talk to an Angel" from the top spot. Due to an "explosion" in sales and radio airplay, it was the fastest single to rise to number one on the Billboard Hot 100 at the time since Paul and Linda McCartney's "Uncle Albert/Admiral Halsey" in 1971. Houston tied with Madonna for the most number one singles by a female artist at the time. It spent 14 cumulative weeks at the top of the US Billboard Hot 100, which at the time was a record.

It became Houston's longest run atop the chart, surpassing her previous record of three weeks with "Greatest Love of All" in 1986. It is also the longest running number-one single from a soundtrack album. It holds the record for the most consecutive weeks at number one in the US by a solo artist, sharing the title with Elton John's "Candle in the Wind '97." It is the longest running female consecutive number one single in history, earning Houston a Guinness World Record.

The song also dominated other Billboard charts, spending 14 weeks at the top of the Billboard Hot 100 Single Sales chart, and 11 weeks at number one on its Hot 100 Airplay chart. The song remained at number one on the Mainstream Top 40 chart for nine consecutive weeks. It was Houston's first single on the chart and her first number one.

The song debuted at number 58 on the Hot R&B Singles chart on November 14, 1992 and topped the Hot R&B Singles chart on December 5, displacing "If I Ever Fall in Love" by Shai, and would spend eleven consecutive weeks at number one, becoming Houston's sixth number one single on the chart and also her longest-running chart-topper there. It established another chart record at the time, overtaking both "I Can't Stop Loving You" by Ray Charles and "Sexual Healing" by Marvin Gaye as the longest-running number one single since Billboard merged its previously separate R&B sales and airplay charts in 1958.

It debuted at number 28 on the Hot Adult Contemporary chart on November 14, 1992, becoming the Hot Shot Debut of the week. Just six weeks later, on December 19, it topped the chart, displacing Michael Bolton's rendition of "To Love Somebody", where it would stay for five weeks, becoming her longest-running number one on that chart.

Houston set several more chart records in the United States with the song becoming Houston's fourth "triple-crown" number one hit on Billboard after topping the pop, R&B and adult contemporary charts following its ascent to the top of the latter chart on December 19. In doing so, it matched her with Motown artist Lionel Richie for the most solo triple-crown number one singles in history. (Note: In his write-up, Billboard chart researcher Paul Grein claimed Richie had five triple-crown number ones from 1978-1986, adding in his hit with the Commodores, "Three Times a Lady", which topped all three charts in 1978. Richie had four solo triple-crown chart-toppers: "Endless Love", "All Night Long (All Night)", "Hello" and "Say You, Say Me".) Houston remains the only female artist to accomplish this feat.

It also set the record for the most simultaneous weeks at number one on three major Billboard charts as it would simultaneously stay at number one on the Hot 100, Hot R&B Singles and Adult Contemporary charts for five consecutive weeks from December 19, 1992 to January 16, 1993, breaking the 30-year chart record set by American musician Ray Charles, whose 1962 hit "I Can't Stop Loving You" had simultaneously topped all three charts for four weeks.

During the song's initial chart tenure on the Billboard Hot 100, it remained in the top 40 for 24 weeks. It remains Arista Records' biggest hit.

The song stayed at number one in the U.S. throughout January and February 1993, making it the first time Billboard did not rank a new number-one single until March of the new year where "A Whole New World" by Peabo Bryson and Regina Belle finally unseated it. In addition, for the weeks of March 13 and March 20, 1993, the song was joined by two other Houston singles from the soundtrack -- "I'm Every Woman" and "I Have Nothing" -- in being placed inside the top twenty of the Billboard Hot 100, the first time in history for a female artist. Houston's "I Will Always Love You" was also the year-end number one single of 1993 in the US.

Houston's "I Will Always Love You" was also a massive international hit, topping the singles charts in almost every country, including the Eurochart Hot 100 Singles, where it spent 13 weeks at the top, then a record for a female artist. The single ruled the summit position for ten weeks in Canada, ten weeks in Australia, five weeks in Austria, seven weeks for Belgium, eight weeks in France, six weeks in Germany, eight weeks in Ireland, six weeks in the Netherlands, fourteen weeks in New Zealand, nine weeks in Norway, one week in Spain and Uruguay, six weeks in Sweden, eight weeks in Switzerland, and ten weeks in the UK. Houston's ten-week reign in the UK was the longest run at the top by a solo female artist in the history of the British singles chart, until it was overtaken by Tones & I's hit, "Dance Monkey", in 2019. Houston holds the record for the most simultaneous weeks at number one in the US and UK by a woman with ten with the song, second only to "Shape of You" by Ed Sheeran. Houston set another UK chart record by blocking American singer Michael Jackson's hit "Heal the World" from the number one slot during the Christmas holiday week, making her the first female artist to have a Christmas number-one single in the country. It became the number one single of the year in the UK and was the ninth biggest single of 1993 in the same country, marking the first time in history that a song made the top ten of the year-end list twice. In Australia, it was the number 17 single of 1992 and the number two song of 1993. It was the year-end number one song for in three countries – the U.S., Canada and the UK.

Houston's single sold approximately 400,000 copies in its second week at the top of the charts, making it the best-selling song in a single week surpassing Bryan Adams' "(Everything I Do) I Do It for You". It broke its own record in the following three weeks, peaking at 632,000 copies in the week ending on December 27, 1992. The January 9, 1993, issue of Billboard reported it had broken its own record for most copies sold in a single week for any song in the Nielsen SoundScan era. This record was broken by Elton John's "Candle in the Wind 1997/Something About the Way You Look Tonight", which sold 3.4 million in the final week of September 1997. "I Will Always Love You" was certified four times Platinum in the U.S. for shipments of over 4 million copies by the Recording Industry Association of America (RIAA) on January 12, 1993, making Houston the first solo artist with a single to reach that level in RIAA history as well as the only female artist to achieve that feat. It was also just the second single after "We Are the World" to reach four million certified units in the United States. According to Nielsen SoundScan, as of 2009, the single had sold 4,591,000 copies, and had become the second best-selling physical single in the US. On January 12, 2022, the single was certified Diamond by the RIAA for selling 10 million equivalent sales units from sales and streams, becoming the second-eldest song in history to do so after Queen's "Bohemian Rhapsody" and the third song overall in the 20th century to do so, preceded by "Bohemian Rhapsody" and Mariah Carey's 1994 Christmas single, "All I Want for Christmas is You". With this accomplishment, Houston became only the third female artist to have a diamond single and album in the United States. In June 2025, three years after its last certification, the song was certified eleven times platinum by the RIAA for equivalent sales of 11 million copies.

In the UK, the single sold over 1,550,000 copies, becoming the tenth best-selling single of the 1990s, and was certified two times Platinum by the British Phonographic Industry (BPI) on January 1, 1993. In doing so, it became just the second single by a female artist in UK music history after Jennifer Rush's "The Power of Love" to sell a million copies in the UK. In 1992 alone the single had sold 960,000 copies in United Kingdom. In 1993 the single sold 395,000 copies in United Kingdom. Houston earned another Guinness World Record with the song in the UK as it was deemed the best-selling UK single by a female R&B artist of all time, a record Houston also maintains to this day. It was certified Platinum for shipments of over 500,000 copies by the Bundesverband Musikindustrie (BVMI) in Germany. In Japan, "I Will Always Love You" sold over 810,000 copies, staying for 27 weeks on the chart, and became the best-selling single by a foreign female artist at the time, despite not topping the charts (Edward Furlong's 1992 single "Hold on Tight" kept it from reaching number one).

Only a few hours after Houston's death on February 11, 2012, "I Will Always Love You" topped the US iTunes charts. A week later, the single returned to the Billboard Hot 100 after almost twenty years, debuting at number seven, and posthumously becoming a top-ten single for Houston, her first since 2001. The song eventually peaked at number three (two spots shy of repeating the feat achieved by Chubby Checker when "The Twist" returned to the top position after previously falling off the chart). It was just one of twelve songs to re-enter the Billboard Hot 100 inside the top ten and just the third song in history to do so at the time. It debuted on the Billboard Hot Digital Singles Chart at number three on the chart dated February 25, 2012, with over 195,000 copies downloaded. In the UK, the song charted at number ten the week of Houston's death. On September 14, 2026, the song reached a billion streams on Spotify, Houston's third song to do so.

== Accolades ==
"I Will Always Love You" won the 1994 Grammy Awards for Record of the Year and Best Female Pop Vocal Performance, Houston's third win in the latter category after earlier wins in 1986 and 1988. During the Grammy Award telecast, Dolly Parton and David Foster presented the latter Grammy to Houston. The song was ranked the number one single of 1993 simultaneously on the Billboard Hot 100 and Hot R&B Singles year-end charts, the first time in nine years that a single accomplished the feat after "When Doves Cry" by Prince back in 1984. It was also the first song by a woman to accomplish this milestone. In addition, it received Favorite Pop/Rock Song and Favorite Soul/R&B Song awards at the 21st American Music Awards, which was the first record by a solo artist to win both categories, and the second overall in AMA history behind "Endless Love" by Lionel Richie & Diana Ross in 1982. "I Will Always Love You" won two Japan Gold Disc Awards in 1993 for International Song of the Year, and a 1994 International Song of the Year Special Award for Japanese sales of over one million units.

In 2009, the ballad was ranked the 17th most played song in public places in Great Britain by Phonographic Performance Limited (PPL). In February 2013, the song was voted the number one love song of all time by The Harris Poll. In 2019, "I Will Always Love You" was selected by the Library of Congress for preservation in the National Recording Registry for being "culturally, historically, or aesthetically significant". In 2021, "I Will Always Love You" was listed at number 94 on the updated list of Rolling Stone's 500 Greatest Songs of All Time. In 2023, "I Will Always Love You" was listed at number 60 on Billboard's list of the 500 Best Pop Songs of All Time, Houston's second highest-ranked song on the list.

Accolades for "I Will Always Love You" by Whitney Houston
Organization	Year	Award	Result	Ref.
American Music Awards	1994	Favorite Pop/Rock Single	Won	
American Music Awards	1994	Favorite Soul/R&B Single	Won	
Billboard Music Awards	1993	#1 Hot 100 Single (Hot 100 Single of the Year)	Won	
Billboard Music Awards	1993	#1 Hot R&B Single (R&B Single of the Year)	Won	
Billboard Music Awards	1993	Special Award: Single Most Weeks at No. 1 (14 weeks)	Won	
Billboard Music Awards	1993	No. 1 World Single	Won	
Billboard Music Awards	1993	No. 1 Hot 100 Singles Sales	Won	
Billboard Music Awards	1993	No. 1 Hot R&B Singles Sales	Won	
Grammy Awards	1994	Record of the Year	Won	
Grammy Awards	1994	Best Pop Vocal Performance – Female	Won	
Grammy Hall of Fame	2018	Grammy Hall of Fame	Inducted	
Japan Gold Disc Awards	1993	Song of the Year – International	Won	
Japan Gold Disc Awards	1994	Special Award	Won	
Library of Congress	2020	National Recording Registry	Inducted	
MTV Movie Awards	1993	Best Song from a Movie	Won	
Online Film & Television Association Awards	2022	Film Hall of Fame: Songs	Inducted	
People's Choice Awards	1993	Favorite New Music Video	Won	
Soul Train Music Awards	1993	Best R&B/Soul Single – Female	Won	
Soul Train Music Awards	1994	Best R&B Song of the Year	Won	

=== Critic lists ===
"I Will Always Love You" on select critic lists
Publisher/critic	Year	Listicle	Rank	Ref.
American Film Institute	2004	AFI's 100 Years... 100 Songs	65	
Billboard	2023	The 500 Best Pop Songs of All Time	60	
Billboard	2023	Top 50 Love Songs of All Time	6	
Billboard	2024	The Top 75 Movie Songs of All Time	7	
Cleveland.com	2020	Best Billboard Hot 100 No. 1 Songs of the 1990s	7	
Cosmopolitan	2022	A Definitive Ranking of the 82 Best '90s Love Songs	1	
Cosmopolitan	2024	60 of the Best '90s Songs for the Ultimate Throwback Playlist	57	
LiveAbout	2021	100 of the Best Pop Songs of All Time	37	
Elle	2020	The Best Love Songs of All Time	Placed	
Esquire	2024	The 50 Best Songs of the '90s	33	
Esquire	2026	25 Most American Songs of All Time	Placed	
Forbes	2024	The 50 Best Songs Of The 1990s	1	
The Guardian	2014	50 Best Covers of All Time	10	
Glamour	2020	53 Best '90s Songs That Are All That and a Bag of Chips	5	
Mental Floss	2023	The 25 Most Powerful Songs of the Past 25 Years	23	
MTV	2007	100 Greatest Songs of the '90s	4	
MTV Australia	2013	The Official Top 1000 All Time Classics	No order	
NME	2012	NME's Greatest No. 1 Singles in History	8	
Paste	2023	Best #1 Hits of 1993	1	
Paste	2023	The 100 Greatest Cover Songs of All Time	10	
Phonographic Performance Limited	2009	Most Played Songs in Public in Britain	17	
Pitchfork	2022	The 250 Best Songs of the 1990s	59	
Refinery29	2014	Sad Breakup Songs of All Time	5	
Rolling Stone	2007	100 Greatest Songs of the '90s	4	
Rolling Stone	2013	20 Great Songs From 1993	Placed	
Rolling Stone	2021	The 500 Greatest Songs of All Time	94	
Smooth Radio	2024	The 100 Greatest Songs of the 1990s	8	
Time Out	2024	50 Greatest Breakup Songs of All Time	13	
VH1	2000	100 Greatest Pop Songs	40	
VH1	2003	100 Best Songs of the Past 25 Years	8	
VH1	2012	40 Greatest R&B Songs of the '90s	3	

== Music video ==
=== Shooting and synopsis ===
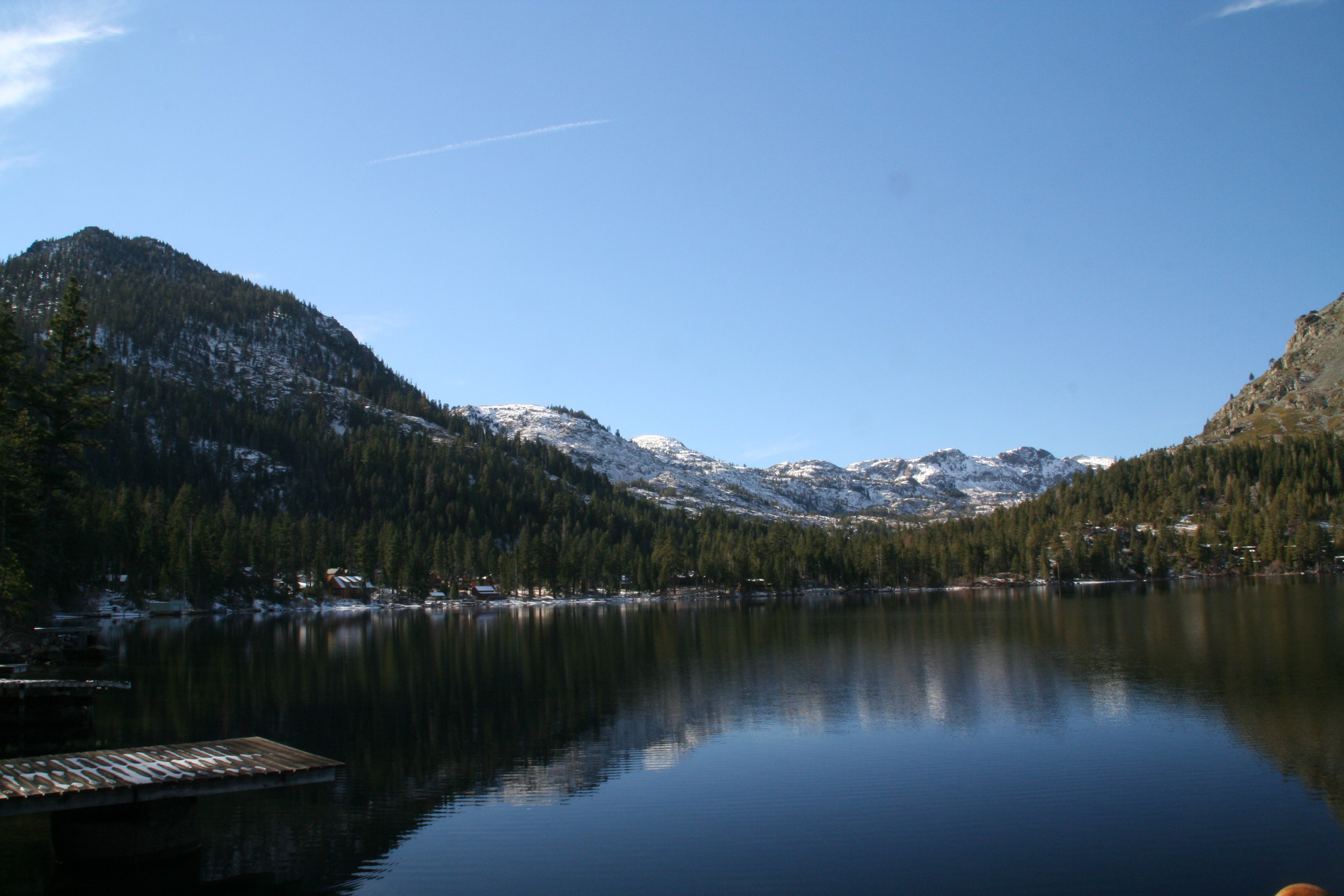
The most remembered scene of the "I Will Always Love You" music video was of its reenactment of Fallen Leaf Lake, California after Houston dramatically sings the final chorus.

The single's music video was shot at a Hollywood soundstage in Los Angeles around October 1992, directed by English photographer and music video director Nick Brandt and produced by Rob Newman. At the time of its shooting, Houston was four months pregnant with daughter Bobbi Kristina Brown, as a result she decided to shoot her scenes at the soundstage.

After the video starts with Houston's character in the film, Rachel Marron, singing the opening acapella bars at the end of The Bodyguard, its basic plot was of Houston, dressed in a dark blue suit, sitting at an empty theater in a chair singing the song with the spotlight shining on her. Houston's scenes were interspersed with scenes from the film and this gives the viewer the experience of reliving the moments with the singer. The different scenes of the film were matched by re-enactments at the theater.

During the third verse, Houston closes her eyes and after the camera zooms in on her face, the drum beat drops and she opens her eyes and sings the chorus after the key change and the theater itself transforms into an open-air snowy field, which is meant to be at Fallen Leaf Lake, California, where The Bodyguard's boat scene was filmed. By the ending, the scene returns back to the empty theater.

Brandt's initial interpretation of the music video was said to be more artistic with the Houston scenes being from an isolated performance than what appeared in the final editing by Clive Davis and Warner Bros Pictures executives, who insisted on including scenes from The Bodyguard.

An upset Brandt felt the final editing of the video made it look more like a "commercial movie trailer". As a result of the edits, Brandt used the name Alan Smithee instead of his own name, a traditional Hollywood pseudonym used by directors who disowned their final cuts.

=== Release ===
The video immediately premiered on MTV to heavy rotation on December 5, 1992 and became one of her most popular music videos to date, also earning heavy rotation on every music video channel, including BET and VH1.

On October 24, 2020, the video for "I Will Always Love You" reached at least one billion views on YouTube, making it the first music video of the 20th century by a solo artist to reach the milestone.

== Live performances ==
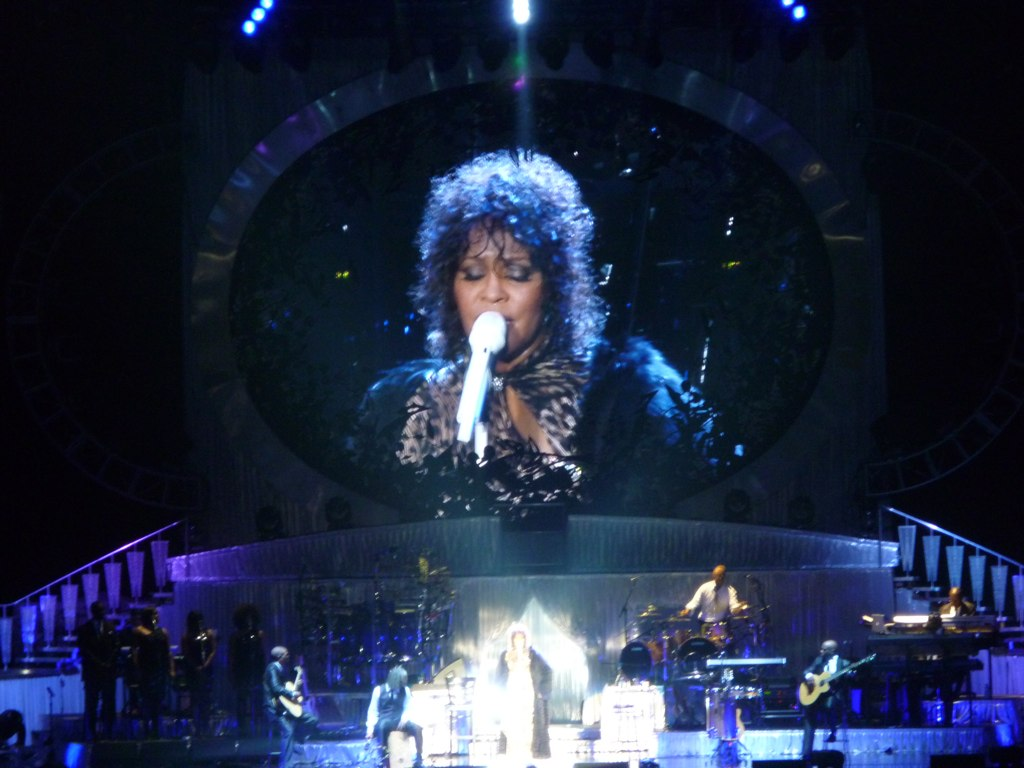
Houston performing at the Mediolanum Forum in Milan during the Nothing but Love World Tour in May 2010

Houston would first perform the song on English comedian Des O'Connor's ITV variety show, Des O'Connor Tonight in late 1992. Houston would perform the song for all of the remainder of her concert tours starting with the Bodyguard World Tour (1993–1994) and ending with her final concert tour, the Nothing but Love World Tour (2009–2010). During the song's key chord change in shows throughout The Bodyguard World Tour, as Houston belted the chorus, pyrotechnics from the back of the stage would shoot up behind her and her band. The song was also performed live on her second HBO concert special, Whitney: The Concert for a New South Africa at Johannesburg's Ellis Park Stadium on November 12, 1994. Houston made history by becoming the first international artist to headline at South Africa following the end of the country's apartheid rule and the inauguration of Nelson Mandela. In the performance, the pyrotechnics shot from up in the sky. During a long pause in the performance where audiences cheered the singer on, Houston told the audience, "my heart belongs to you, South Africa", before finishing the song. The landmark performance would later be dramatized for the Houston biopic, Whitney Houston: I Wanna Dance with Somebody (2022).

Houston also gave a memorable performance of the song at the 36th Annual Grammy Awards in March 1994, which opened the show. The performance has since been hailed as one of the greatest Grammy performances of the award ceremony's history. The performance re-aired during the 54th Annual Grammy Awards on February 12, 2012, following Houston's death and, again, in November of that year, for the Grammy special, We Will Always Love You: A Grammy Salute to Whitney Houston. Later in 1994, Houston performed the song at the World Music Awards and at the 1994 FIFA World Cup at the Rose Bowl in Pasadena, California in front of 92,000 fans at the stadium and with over a billion people watching on television. In August 1996, Houston performed the song at the Jerudong Park Amphitheater at Jerudong Park, Bandar Seri Bagawan, Brunei, for the Whitney: Brunei The Royal Wedding Celebration. Houston opened her third HBO concert special, Classic Whitney: Live from Washington, D.C. (1997) by performing the song, receiving a standing ovation. During the promotion of the album, My Love Is Your Love, in April 1999, Houston performed the song during Divas Live '99, receiving a standing ovation after hitting the high note after the famous delayed drum beat. A year later, she performed the song again on the Arista Records silver anniversary special, 25 Years of #1 Hits - Arista Records 25th Anniversary Celebration (2000); that same year she walked onstage singing the song's chorus a cappella at the 2000 MTV Video Music Awards after an introduction by Britney Spears and Christina Aguilera, walking out to cheers and a standing ovation. Houston performed the song, alongside "I Have Nothing" at the first annual BET Awards where she became the first recipient of the BET Lifetime Achievement Award in 2001. Three years later, on September 15, 2004, Houston performed the song again, alongside her 1996 hit ballad, "I Believe in You and Me", at the World Music Awards at the Thomas & Mack Center in Las Vegas in what was held as a comeback performance for the artist in her first televised performance since 2003.

== Legacy and cultural impact ==
=== Impact on music and popular culture ===
Houston's vocal performance on "I Will Always Love You" has been hailed as one of the most influential moments in pop music and culture. According to Nick Levine of the BBC, the song "wasn't just a hit, but an unstoppable cultural phenomenon." Along with Mariah Carey's "Hero" and Celine Dion's "My Heart Will Go On", the song "set a template – and a very high bar – for many female singers who sought to break through on the popular TV talent shows of the early 2000s," Levine continues. In the same article, vocal coaches Carrie and David Grant, who worked with contestants on the British talent shows Pop Idol and Fame Academy, said that the song, among some of the singer's other landmark recordings such as "Greatest Love of All" and "I Have Nothing", became a gold standard that was rarely attainable.

Said Carrie Grant, "Just about every singer we taught or auditioned for about five years wanted to master I Will Always Love You or The Greatest Love of All or I Have Nothing... Most of [them] should have tried something a little easier – many a singer has been wiped out in an attempt to do Whitney!"

Korean pop singer Dami Im, one of the singers heavily influenced by Houston, told the BBC, "Whitney knew how to use the full range in her voice to fully connect emotionally with the song and create such drama." Im went on to say in regard to Houston that she "raised the bar for all female vocalists with her use of range and dynamics."

The song's impact was also felt in countries as far as Russia and China. In the latter country, Houston was praised posthumously by Chinese musicians and producers as being an "inspirational figure who opened the door to Western pop music" in the country, following the success of the ballad. Houston's success with "I Will Always Love You" in China came at a time when "the only way for many people to hear about Western pop acts was through limited edition tapes and music magazines," according to China Daily. Taiwanese singer Lin Yu-chun went viral after his cover of the song was posted on YouTube and attracted over ten million views. Lin, who was influenced by Houston, dreamed of performing a duet with the singer, which ended with Houston's untimely death, with Lin saying, "My dream can never be fulfilled now. My heart is broken."

In his February 13, 2012 article on the song following Houston's death, Randall Roberts of the Los Angeles Times claimed the singer's tone in the song as "pure and game-changing".

Joe Levy wrote on an article about the song to The Hollywood Reporter how the song was "Whitney’s greatest moment and one of the greatest moments in American pop." Levy stated the song was "was monumental, undeniable and, as many of her recordings were, a triumph of vocal ability that presents itself as human indomitability. The caesura just before the drum beat, and she takes off for that impossible note? It’s a moonshot, and we get to be strapped into the rocket and take the ride with her. And that she laces everything up to that point with a tangle of vulnerability and joy makes it even more amazing, like she’s painting five or six different pictures before deciding, screw it, let’s just go Technicolor! 3D!! We’ll need a bigger theater!!!"

Levy noted that despite the Los Angeles riots of that year and how the music of Nirvana and Dr. Dre was more emblematic of the times, Houston's song shattered myths about race in music, writing "even if you never knew this was a country cover, it still crosswires genres and audiences and upends the notion that black and white music (and audiences) don’t talk directly to each other." Levy added that Houston's "rounding through operatic technique, blue yodels and gospel before climaxing in pure Elvis-in-Vegas glory" was "almost like a historical tour of American singing – or America itself." Levy added of the song's impact, "as with so much pop music, it’s an enactment of American potential, an expression of an ideal of unity that is usually nothing more than that: an ideal. Except for the time it takes to listen to one song or to dance to another. Then it’s an ideal in action", comparing it to Houston's powerful rendition of "The Star-Spangled Banner".

Levy noted how like "I Will Always Love You", most of Houston's songs in her catalog were "songs of heartbreak" and how Houston "could turn every lyric, every song, into an expression of jubilation. It’s a gospel singer’s touch, and it’s the one she left us with."

In his 2013 write-up of Houston's five best songs, Mikael Wood of the Los Angeles Times listed "I Will Always Love You" as a song that "helped redefine soul singing in the 1990s as a showcase for skyscraping vocal technique."

Van Toffler, then president of MTV, stated in 2012 of the song's impact with The Bodyguard film: "There are moments in music where you pair a song with the right visual, sort of like what happened with Madonna and "Like a Virgin" at the VMAs. For Whitney, starring opposite a major movie star with a song that perfect just catapulted her to another level." Continued Toffler, "That video was in heavy rotation next to Alice in Chains and Snoop. She won the MTV Movie Award for Best Song From a Movie in 1993, and she sang it on the show. Let’s just say that occasionally people are singing not-live. So to see somebody with that capability just stand up and sing, it’s quite overwhelming."

The song's producer David Foster stated, "When you think about how many rules that song broke for radio – it was a ballad, it was an R&B singer doing a country song, it’s got that a cappella part, it’s long. It was a perfect storm. I don’t want to overdramatize, but it is the love song of the century."

In addition, pop singer Rihanna credited the song to influence her decision to enter the music industry, telling MTV News: "My first song that I remember falling in love with was a Whitney Houston song: 'I Will Always Love You'. It was really inspiring, and it made me develop a passion for music, so really, she’s partly responsible for me being here in this industry."

J.E. Reich of the website Nicki Swift compared the song's enormous crossover success to that of "Old Town Road" by Lil Nas X, which mixed country music and hip-hop, as proof of the song's legacy.

Houston was credited for popularizing melisma following the release of "I Will Always Love You". Lauren Everitt from BBC News commented: "An early 'I' in Whitney Houston's 'I Will Always Love You' takes nearly six seconds to sing. In those seconds the former gospel singer-turned-pop star packs a series of different notes into the single syllable", stated Everitt. "The technique is repeated throughout the song, most pronouncedly on every 'I' and 'you'. The vocal technique is called melisma and it has inspired a host of imitators. Other artists may have used it before Houston, but it was her rendition of Dolly Parton's love song that pushed the technique into the mainstream in the 90s. [ ... ] But perhaps what Houston nailed best was moderation." Everitt said that "[i]n a climate of reality shows ripe with 'oversinging,' it's easy to appreciate Houston's ability to save melisma for just the right moment." "I Will Always Love You" is considered the "Olympic gold standard of performances".

In addition to the song's impact on vocal performance, the song also reflected Houston's own transition from her previous material. In 2000, while being interviewed for Out as she was about to release her first compilation album, Whitney: The Greatest Hits, the singer stated, "from 'How Will I Know' to 'Love Will Save the Day', that girl's gone. From 'I Will Always Love You' on, that's a woman."

In its list of 40 best Whitney Houston songs, BET ranked it first place calling it "quite simply one of the biggest and boldest moments in American pop music history."

The Guardian ranked it Houston's eighth best, writing "it's easy to take 'I Will Always Love You' for granted... try and disassociate it from its all-pervading status and listen to the vocal: for all the flourishes and power notes, it never loses its emotional heft, never sounds like Houston doesn't mean every word".

The song was voted the second greatest Houston song of all time by Rolling Stone readers in 2012 with the magazine writing that her performance in the song "– which alternates between subtlety and soaring grandeur – is utterly gutting."

Billboard ranked the song her fourth best, stating that while there was "no overstating the commercial impact of this song... "its true legacy [was] its cultural and emotional resonance".

Both The Ringer and Time included the song in their lists of the greatest breakup songs of all time.

Paste listed the rendition of the song as the tenth greatest cover of all time and wrote that while Dolly Parton's original was a "gorgeous ballad for the ages", that Houston's version "transformed it into one of the most powerful and heartbreaking proclamations of love and loss in pop music history", and that it was a "masterclass in how to sing a soul ballad."

In December 1999, it was ranked the 13th most played song of the 20th century by BMI.

In 2015, the song was also named one of the most iconic songs of all time according to a study by Goldsmith's College, which analyzed various songs featured in numerous 'all-time best' lists, using analytical software to compare their key, BPM, chord variety, lyrical content, timbral variety, and sonic variance.

In 2000, the song was voted the 40th greatest pop song since 1963 by Rolling Stone and MTV.

Songfacts claimed in 2002, as the United States prepared to go to war with Iraq, Saddam Hussein had the song covered by an Iraq-based vocalist during his re-election campaign. Houston's record label filed a complaint to the Iraqi mission in the United Nations.

In July 2020, a digital publication The Pudding carried out a study on the most widely-known songs from the '90s and songs that are most known by Millennials and the people of Generation Z. "I Will Always Love You" was the tenth song with the highest recognizability rate.

In 2026, Houston's rendition of the song made Esquire's list of the "25 Most American Songs of All Time", with journalist Alan Light writing that the song "was an era-defining record, with a bravura vocal delivery that set the template for a generation of R&B singers and the melisma-heavy sound of television singing-competition shows." Light further explained, "...Houston’s slow build from the a cappella first verse to the jaw-dropping explosive climax was a true emotional knockout in the greatest soul-gospel tradition", concluding that the song "represented the culmination of America’s musical century, blending country-music storytelling, pop sonic architecture, and Black creative expression".

In June 2026, CBS News included the song in its list of the 250 essential American songs of the past 250 years, one of two Houston songs to make the list.

In October 2026, the song was included in Vice's list of the "3 of the Most Impressive Vocal Performances of the 1990s" alongside Jeff Buckley's rendition of "Hallelujah" and Nirvana's rendition of "Where Did You Sleep Last Night" from their MTV Unplugged set.

In addition, the song has been heavily featured in box office films and TV shows since its release, including The Simpsons, American Dad, Futurama, Spider-Man: Far From Home and This Is the End among others. For Super Bowl LX, the song was used in a commercial for Bud Light starting Post Malone, Peyton Manning and Shane Gillis.

=== Covers, samples and tributes ===
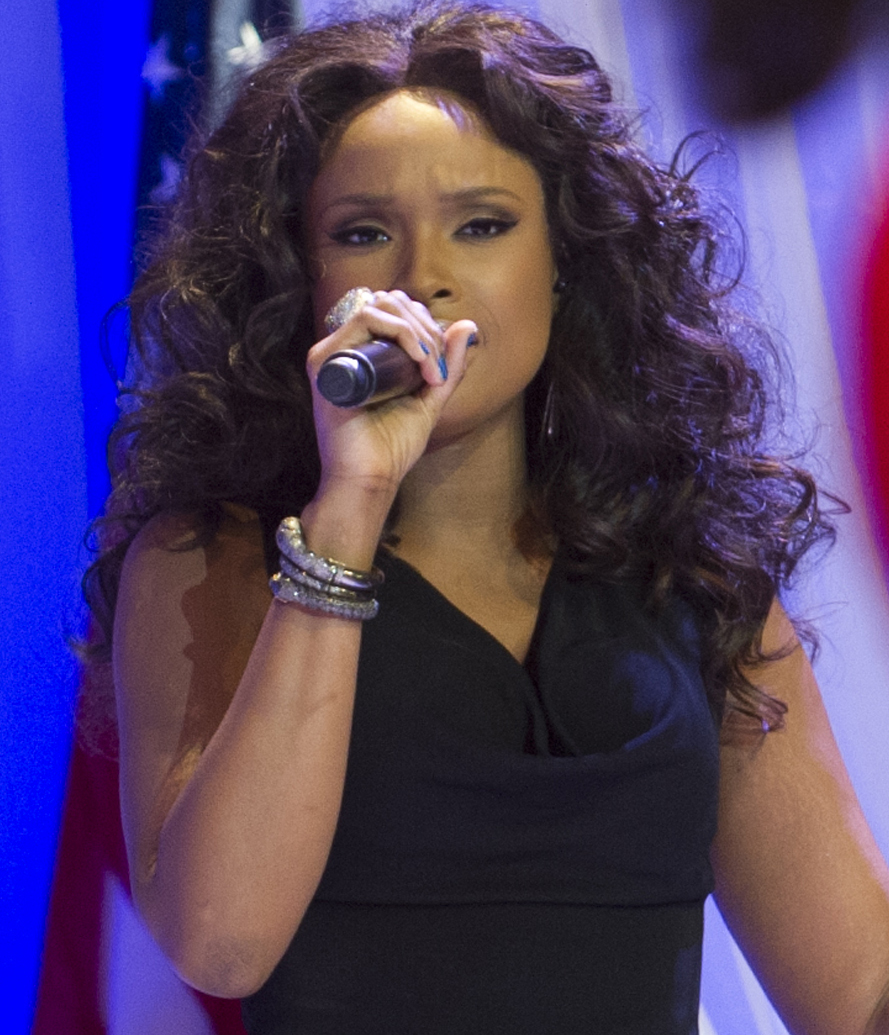
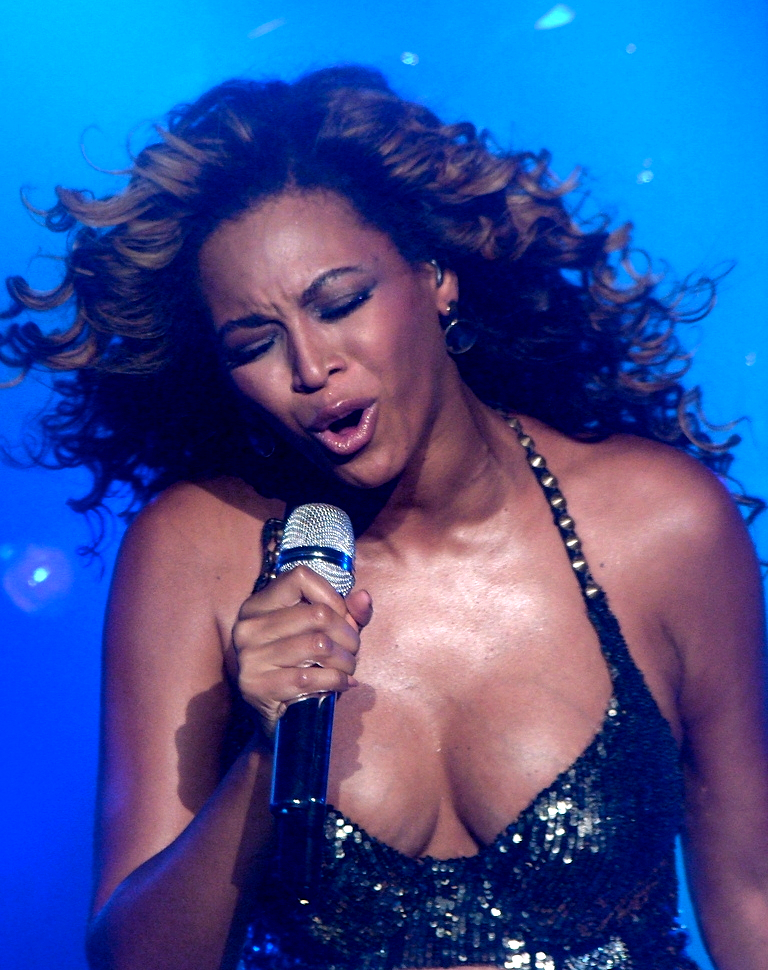
Singers Jennifer Hudson (left) and Beyoncé (right) have covered Houston's rendition of "I Will Always Love You" among many other artists.

Houston's rendition of the song has been covered over the years with 191 renditions. Among the most notable covers of Houston's rendition of the song include Zapp & Roger and Shirley Murdock, LeAnn Rimes, Keke Wyatt, Jennifer Hudson and Beyoncé, who sang it live during her Revel Presents: Beyoncé Live residency tour at the Revel resort in Atlantic City, New Jersey during May 2012, in tribute to Houston, who died that February, often covering it before segueing into her hit, "Halo", to which was also dedicated to Houston during the residency.

Just days after Houston's death in February 2012, Glee actress and singer Amber Riley gave what critics called a "powerful performance" of "I Will Always Love You" on the Glee episode, "Heart". At the end of the episode, the screen faded to black and then showcased the words "Whitney Houston, 1963-2012, We Will Always Love You."

In 2012, YouTuber JonTron did his short version on his Banjo-Kazooie: Nuts & Bolts review.

Later, in 2013, during her The Mrs. Carter Show World Tour, Beyoncé also sang the opening lines of "I Will Always Love You" prior to the performance of "Halo" as the final song of the tour. That year, on the Family Guy episode, "Boopa-dee Bappa-dee", Chris Griffin sang it in his version as part of the national anthem. In The Amazing World of Gumball episode, The Ex, a parodied version of the song ("Love Me Forever") plays briefly after Gumball gets Rob to hate him again.

Hudson sang the song for Houston when she received the BET Honors Entertainers Award in January 2010 and, again, on February 12, 2012, at the 54th Annual Grammy Awards as a tribute to Houston, who died the night before. Parton complimented Hudson on her performance, saying,

I was brought to tears again last night, as I'm sure many were, when Jennifer Hudson sang "I Will Always Love You" on the Grammys in memory of Whitney. Like everybody else, I am still in shock. But I know that Whitney will live forever in all the great music that she left behind. I will always have a very special piece of her in the song we shared together and had the good fortune to share with the world. Rest in peace, Whitney. Again, we will always love you.

Twelve years later, in a tribute to Houston at the 50th anniversary special for the American Music Awards, Hudson covered the song again, while also adding in the song "I Loves You, Porgy", to commemorate the 30th anniversary of Houston's legendary 1994 American Music Awards performance where she also covered "I Loves You, Porgy" along with the Dreamgirls ballad, "And I Am Telling You I'm Not Going".

In June 2026, Hudson covered the song again at the funeral of Clive Davis, who died on June 22 of that year.

In addition, the song has also been heavily sampled, with around 64 songs from various genres either directly sampling Houston's vocals from the hook or vocally reinterpreting the song's hook and its a cappella intro.

Canadian deejay Sickick performed a mashup of the song along with fellow pop diva Celine Dion's own landmark hit, "My Heart Will Go On" (1997), in his 2022 song, "Go On".

Other samples of the song were produced by the likes of British rapper Theophilus London, the electronic music band Salem, American rappers Twista, Juelz Santana and Gudda Gudda, American R&B group Next and singer Sheléa.

The song was played at Houston's funeral as her casket was brought out of the church. The song title also served as the epitaph on Houston's gravestone.

At the 2017 commencement of the University of Southern California, comedic actor Will Ferrell sang "I Will Always Love You" to the graduating class.

=== Reaction from Dolly Parton ===
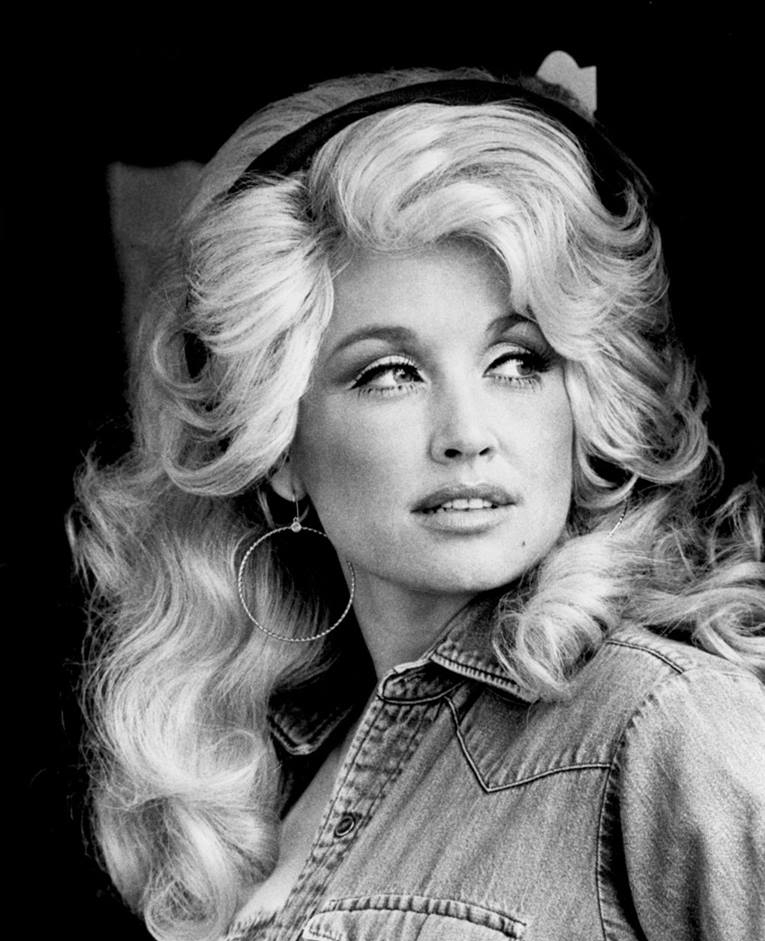
Dolly Parton, the song's original performer and writer (pictured in 1977), denied tabloid reports of a feud between her and Houston over the song.

After Houston's recording became a hit in 1992, the tabloid press began reporting on a supposed "feud" between Houston and Dolly Parton, stemming from Parton allegedly reneging on an agreement that she would not perform the song for a number of months while Houston's version was on the charts, so as not to compete with Houston's recording.

However, both Parton and Houston dismissed any rumors, speaking glowingly of one another in interviews.

Houston praised Parton for writing a beautiful song. In return, Parton thanked Houston for bringing her song to a wider audience and increasing the amount of royalties in the process. Parton also gave a live interview, confirming this. Parton also publicly stated she liked Houston's version of the song better than her own.

Parton recalled that when she first heard the song while driving in Nashville the week of its release that she "just heard this voice come on the radio. It kind of rang a bell, but it didn't hit because she was kind of talking it. Then, all of a sudden, it went into the 'I Will Always Love You' part and I just about wrecked. I had to pull off the side of the road, seriously, to listen to it."

Parton stated that she was “overwhelmed” and that Houston "made it so much more than it ever would have been." In an interview with Howard Stern, Parton added "I couldn't believe my little country sad song could even be done like that. That was one of the greatest experiences I've ever had in my entire life."

Parton further added: "When Whitney did 'I Will Always Love You,' I mean look what a grand song she made out of that simple, heartfelt, you know, song ... it was just amazing. Whitney is the one who took it worldwide and really made it a household word – or song, I should say – so I'll always be thankful to her for that."

She further added that the song helped people put her "in the forefront as a writer". She stated, "I was just a girl with the big hair and big tits and a big personality, but I think that one kind of pointed a finger at me as a serious songwriter and the fact that it did so well and I was so touched by it and so honored by it. That one will stand out in my mind forever."

When the song was played at Houston's funeral, she added, "[It] just shattered me to hear that song played under those conditions [...] I thought my heart was gonna stop. It just pierced me like a knife. It's just – I can't explain that feeling, to think that that was so final for her and that that was my words and my feeling – I would forever be so connected to her."

Houston told Rolling Stone in 1993, "I think Dolly Parton is a hell of a writer and a hell of a singer. I was so concerned when I sang her song how she'd feel about it, in terms of the arrangement, my licks, my flavor. When she said she was floored, that meant so much to me."

When Houston won the Best Pop Vocal Performance, Female award at the 36th Annual Grammy Awards for her recording, Parton (along with David Foster) presented the award. In a statement to Billboard mourning Houston's death in February 2012, Parton said:

Mine is only one of the millions of hearts broken over the death of Whitney Houston. I will always be grateful and in awe of the wonderful performance she did on my song and I can truly say from the bottom of my heart, 'Whitney, I will always love you. You will be missed.'

In 2021, Parton reportedly told Andy Cohen on his show Watch What Happens Live with Andy Cohen that she used some of the money she earned from the success of Houston's rendition to invest in a black neighborhood in Nashville, Tennessee as a tribute to Houston.

Said Parton, "it was mostly just black families and people that lived around there," Parton said. "It was a whole strip mall. And I thought, 'This is the perfect place for me to be, considering it was Whitney'."

Continued Parton: "I just thought, 'This was great. I'm going to be down here with her people, who are my people as well.' And so I just love the fact that I spent that money on a complex. And I think, 'This is the house that Whitney built.'"

=== The Whitney Houston TikTok challenge ===
In 2025, a series of videos on the video platform TikTok called "The Whitney Houston Challenge" began circulating. The challenge consists of a person or a group of people standing in front of a drum set, hoping to match the delayed famous "tom" drum beat that hits right before the final chorus.

It has since been attempted by famous celebrities and musicians such as Scarlett Johansson, Jonathan Bailey, Paula Abdul, Calum Scott, Simple Plan and the crew of Good Morning America as well as a Slipknot cover band.

== Formats and track listings ==
UK and Europe 12-inch vinyl single

- A "I Will Always Love You" – 4:31
- B1 "Jesus Loves Me" – 5:11
- B2 "Do You Hear What I Hear?" – 3:31

UK, European, and U.S. 7-inch vinyl single

- A "I Will Always Love You" – 4:31
- B "Jesus Loves Me" – 5:11

US and Europe maxi-CD single

1. "I Will Always Love You" – 4:31
2. "Jesus Loves Me" – 5:11
3. "Do You Hear What I Hear?" – 3:31

Maxi-CD singles (1999 remixes)

1. "I Will Always Love You" (Hex Hector radio edit) – 4:50
2. "I Will Always Love You" (Hex Hector 12-inch club mix) – 9:51
3. "I Will Always Love You" (Hex Hector Anthem dub mix) – 5:44

== Credits and personnel ==
- Performed by Whitney Houston
- Produced and arranged by David Foster
- Vocal arrangement – Whitney Houston
- Directed by Rickey Minor
- Keyboards and Roland JD-800 – David Foster
- Tenor saxophone solo – Kirk Whalum
- Drums – Ricky Lawson
- Percussion – Bashiri Johnson
- Guitars – Ray Fuller, Dean Parks, Michael Landau
- Bass – Neil Stubenhaus
- Synth programmers – Tony Smith, Claude Gaudette
- String arrangements – Ronn Huff
- Recording engineers – Bill Schnee, Dave Reitzas, Peter J. Yianilos
- Mixing engineer – Dave Reitzas
- Executive producers - Clive Davis, Whitney Houston

== Charts ==
=== Weekly charts ===
Chart (1992–1993)	Peak position
Australia (ARIA)	1
Austria (Ö3 Austria Top 40)	1
Belgium (Ultratop 50 Flanders)	1
Canada Top Singles (RPM)	1
Canada Retail Singles (The Record)	22
Canada Adult Contemporary (RPM)	1
Canada Contemporary Hit Radio (The Record)	1
Chile (UPI)	5
Denmark (IFPI)	1
Dominican Republic (UPI)	5
Europe (Eurochart Hot 100 Singles)	1
Europe (European Dance Radio)	1
Europe (European Hit Radio)	1
Finland (Suomen virallinen lista)	2
France (SNEP)	1
Germany (Official German Charts)	1
Greece (IFPI)	2
Iceland (Íslenski Listinn Topp 40)	1
Ireland (IRMA)	1
Israel (Israeli Singles Chart)	1
Italy (Musica e dischi)	2
Japan (Oricon)	5
Mexico (AMPROFON)	1
Netherlands (Dutch Top 40)	1
Netherlands (Single Top 100)	1
New Zealand (Recorded Music NZ)	1
Norway (VG-lista)	1
Panama (UPI)	1
Peru (UPI)	3
Portugal (AFP)	1
Quebec (ADISQ)	1
Spain (AFYVE)	1
Sweden (Sverigetopplistan)	1
Switzerland (Schweizer Hitparade)	1
UK Singles (Official Charts)	1
UK Airplay (Music Week)	1
Uruguay (UPI)	1
US Billboard Hot 100	1
US Hot R&B Singles (Billboard)	1
US Adult Contemporary (Billboard)	1
Zimbabwe (ZIMA)	1

Chart (2012-2013)	Peak position
Australia (ARIA)	8
Austria (Ö3 Austria Top 40)	10
Canada Hot 100 (Billboard)	6
Denmark (Tracklisten)	10
Euro Digital Song Sales (Billboard)	8
Finland (Suomen virallinen lista)	17
France (SNEP)	2
Germany (GfK)	19
Hungary (Single Top 40)	9
Ireland (IRMA)	13
Israel Airplay (Media Forest)	3
Italy (FIMI)	7
Japan Hot 100 (Billboard)	5
Luxembourg Digital Song Sales (Billboard)	4
Netherlands (Dutch Top 40)	17
Netherlands (Single Top 100)	5
New Zealand (Recorded Music NZ)	7
Norway (VG-lista)	12
Portugal Digital Song Sales (Billboard)	2
Scottish Singles Sales (Official Charts)	19
South Korea International (Circle)	20
Spain (Promusicae)	2
Sweden (Sverigetopplistan)	56
Switzerland (Schweizer Hitparade)	3
UK Singles (Official Charts)	14
US Billboard Hot 100	3

2025 weekly chart performance for "I Will Always Love You"
Chart (2025)	Peak position
Moldova Airplay (TopHit)	57

=== Year-end charts ===
Chart (1992)	Position
Australia (ARIA)	17
Brazil (Crowley)	19
Canada Top Singles (RPM)	85
Canada Adult Contemporary (RPM)	97
Netherlands (Dutch Top 40)	61
Sweden (Topplistan)	57
UK Singles (OCC)	1

Chart (1993)	Position
Australia (ARIA)	2
Austria (Ö3 Austria Top 40)	8
Belgium (Ultratop)	16
Canada Top Singles (RPM)	1
Canada Adult Contemporary (RPM)	7
Europe (Eurochart Hot 100)	3
Europe (European Dance Radio)	11
Europe (European Hit Radio)	9
Finland (Suomen virallinen lista)	5
Germany (Media Control)	7
Iceland (Íslenski Listinn Topp 40)	1
Japan (Oricon)	31
Netherlands (Dutch Top 40)	13
Netherlands (Single Top 100)	5
New Zealand (RIANZ)	2
Sweden (Topplistan)	12
Switzerland (Schweizer Hitparade)	7
UK Singles (OCC)	10
UK Airplay (Music Week)	28
US Billboard Hot 100	1
US Hot Adult Contemporary Singles & Tracks (Billboard)	18
US Hot R&B Singles (Billboard)	1
US Cash Box Top 100	5

Chart (2012)	Position
Spain (PROMUSICAE)	49

=== Decade-end charts ===
Chart (1990–1999)	Position
Belgium (Ultratop 50 Flanders)	33
Netherlands (Dutch Top 40)	24
UK Singles (OCC)	9
US Billboard Hot 100	7

=== All-time charts ===
Chart	Position
Dutch Love Songs (Dutch Top 40)	14
UK Singles (OCC)	27
US Billboard Hot 100	54

Billboard Hot 100 anniversary lists

Year	Title	Category	Position	Ref.
1998	Billboard 40 Years of the Top 40	The Top 10 Remakes	2	
1998	Billboard 40 Years of the Top 40	The Top 10 "Love" Songs	2	
1998	Billboard 40 Years of the Top 40	Billboard The Hot 100 of the Hot 100: Top Songs of Four Decades	6	
1998	Billboard 40 Years of the Top 40	The Top 10 Soundtrack Songs	1	
1998	Billboard 40 Years of the Top 40	Song with the Most Weeks at No. 1 (14 weeks)	2	
2008	Billboard Hot 100 50th Anniversary	The Billboard Hot 100 All-Time Top Songs	68	
2008	Billboard Hot 100 50th Anniversary	The All-Time Top R&B/Hip-Hop Songs	27	
2008	Billboard Hot 100 50th Anniversary	Hot 100 Song of the Year – 1993	1	
2013	Billboard Hot 100 55th Anniversary	The Billboard Hot 100 All-Time Top Songs	49	
2013	Billboard Hot 100 55th Anniversary	The All-Time Top R&B/Hip-Hop Songs	27	
2013	Billboard Hot 100 55th Anniversary	Hot 100 Song of the Year – 1993	1	

== Certifications and sales ==
Region	Certification	Certified units/sales
Australia (ARIA)	4× Platinum	280,000^{^}
Austria (IFPI Austria)	Gold	25,000^{*}
Denmark (IFPI Danmark)	Platinum	90,000^{‡}
France (SNEP)	Gold	250,000^{*}
Germany (BVMI)	Platinum	500,000^{^}
Italy (FIMI)	Platinum	50,000^{‡}
Japan (RIAJ) Physical single	5× Platinum	810,000
Japan (RIAJ) Digital single	Platinum	250,000^{*}
Mexico (AMPROFON)	Gold	30,000^{*}
Netherlands (NVPI)	Platinum	75,000^{^}
New Zealand (RMNZ)	2× Platinum	60,000^{‡}
Norway (IFPI Norway)	Platinum	60,000^{‡}
Spain (Promusicae)	Platinum	60,000^{‡}
Sweden (GLF)	Platinum	50,000^{^}
United Kingdom (BPI)	2× Platinum	2,289,000
United States (RIAA)	11× Platinum	11,000,000^{‡}
Summaries
Worldwide	—	24,000,000
^{*} Sales figures based on certification alone.^{^} Shipments figures based on certification alone.^{‡} Sales+streaming figures based on certification alone.

== Release history ==
Region	Date	Format(s)	Label(s)	Ref.
United Kingdom	November 2, 1992	7-inch vinyl; 12-inch vinyl; CD; cassette	Arista	
United States	November 3, 1992	7-inch vinyl; 12-inch vinyl; CD; cassette	Arista	
Australia	November 23, 1992	CD; cassette	Arista	
Japan	December 2, 1992	Mini-CD	Arista	

== See also ==
- List of Australian number-one hits of 1993
- List of Austrian number-one hits of 1993
- List of number-one hits of 1993 (Belgium Flanders)
- List of RPM number-one singles of 1992
- List of RPM number-one singles of 1993
- Dutch Top 40 number-one hits of 1992
- Dutch Top 40 number-one hits of 1993
- List of European number-one hits of 1992
- List of European number-one hits of 1993
- List of French number-one hits of 1993
- Number-one hits of 1993 (Germany)
- List of number-one singles of 1992 (Ireland)
- List of number-one singles of 1993 (Ireland)
- List of number-one hits of 1992 (Italy)
- List of number-one singles in 1992 (New Zealand)
- List of number-one singles in 1993 (New Zealand)
- List of number-one songs in Norway
- List of number-one singles of 1993 (Spain)
- List of number-one singles and albums in Sweden
- List of number-one hits of 1993 (Switzerland)
- List of UK Singles Chart number ones of the 1990s
- List of Hot Adult Contemporary number ones of 1992 and 1993 (U.S.)
- List of Hot 100 Airplay number-one singles of the 1990s
- List of Billboard Mainstream Top 40 number-one songs of the 1990s
- List of Billboard Rhythmic number-one songs of the 1990s
- List of Hot R&B Singles number ones of 1992
- List of Hot R&B Singles number ones of 1993
- List of million-selling singles in the United Kingdom
- List of best-selling singles of the 1990s in the United Kingdom
- List of best-selling singles by year (UK)
- List of UK Singles Chart Christmas number ones
- List of UK top 10 singles in 1992
- List of artists who have achieved simultaneous UK and U.S. number-one hits
- List of best-selling singles in Australia
- List of Top 25 singles for 1992 in Australia
- List of Top 25 singles for 1993 in Australia
- Billboard Year-End Hot 100 singles of 1993
- List of Hot 100 number-one singles of the 1990s (U.S.)
- List of Billboard Hot 100 top 10 singles in 1992
- List of Billboard Hot 100 top 10 singles in 2012
- List of top 10 singles in 2012 (France)
- List of best-selling singles in Japan
- List of best-selling singles
- List of best-selling singles in the United States

== Bibliography ==
- Crawford, Robyn (2019). A Song for You: My Life with Whitney Houston. Dutton. ISBN 978-1-52474-284-3.
- Whitburn, Joel (2004). Top R&B/Hip-Hop Singles: 1942–2004. Record Research Incorporated. ISBN 978-0-89820-160-4.
