= Sarah Washington =

British singer

Sarah Washington (born Sarah Warwick) is a British pop, electronic dance and hi-NRG singer. Before branching out as a solo artist, under her real name she was lead singer in the jazzy house-pop group 'Souled Out' (earlier known as 'Sold Out') who released an album (The Magic of the Language of Music in Effect, 1991) and several singles, well received by the dance community. Later in the 1990s after a name change to Washington, she had four singles reach the UK Singles Chart. She is probably most known for her dance-cover of "I Will Always Love You" which was released in 1993. It peaked at number 12 on the UK Singles Chart, number 15 in Ireland and number three in Spain. Later same year, she recorded a dance version of the George Michael hit "Careless Whisper" that peaked at number 45 in the UK and number 20 in Ireland. Almighty Records released an updated version of the song with new versions in 2012.

In 1996, after Washington got signed under major label AM:PM, the singles "Heaven" and "Everything" reached numbers 28 and 30, respectively. "Heaven" also spent one week at number 50 on the US Billboard Hot Dance Club Play chart in July 1996. An album was also recorded at this time but remained unreleased until 2019, 23 years after it was recorded. The album titled Home to My Thoughts contains 18 tracks and is currently only available to purchase/stream in digital download form.

Working with Stereolove, Australian DJ James Fraser, a new recording of "Heaven" was released on 5 February 2013.

She has also appeared on the Eurodance compilation Dancemania series including Dancemania Speed 2.

== Discography ==
=== Albums ===
- 1996 – Home to My Thoughts (recorded in 1996 but remained unreleased until 2019)

=== Singles ===
- 1993 – "I Will Always Love You (Dance Mix)" – UK #12, IRE #15, SPA #3, SWE #32
- 1993 – "Careless Whisper" – UK #45, IRE #20, AUS #78
- 1996 – "Heaven" – UK #28
- 1996 – "Everything" – UK #30
- 1998 – "Joy Is Free" (Dive feat. Sarah Washington) – UK #88
- 2013 – "Heaven" (Stereolove feat. Sarah Washington)
