= List of VRT Top 30 number-one singles of 1993 =

These hits topped the Ultratop 50 in the Flemish region of Belgium in 1993.

Date	Artist	Title
January 2	One More Time	"Highland"
January 9	Whitney Houston	"I Will Always Love You"
January 16	Charles & Eddie	"Would I Lie to You?"
January 23	Whitney Houston	"I Will Always Love You"
January 30	Whitney Houston	"I Will Always Love You"
February 6	Whitney Houston	"I Will Always Love You"
February 13	Whitney Houston	"I Will Always Love You"
February 20	Whitney Houston	"I Will Always Love You"
February 27	Whitney Houston	"I Will Always Love You"
March 6	Def Dames Dope	It's OK, all right
March 13	2 Unlimited	"No Limit"
March 20	2 Unlimited	"No Limit"
March 27	2 Unlimited	"No Limit"
April 3	2 Unlimited	"No Limit"
April 10	2 Unlimited	"No Limit"
April 17	2 Unlimited	"No Limit"
April 24	Leila K	"Open Sesame"
May 1	Ace of Base	"All That She Wants"
May 8	Ace of Base	"All That She Wants"
May 15	Ace of Base	"All That She Wants"
May 22	Haddaway	"What Is Love"
May 29	Snow	"Informer"
June 5	Snow	"Informer"
June 12	Haddaway	"What Is Love"
June 19	Eros Ramazzotti	"Cose della vita"
June 26	Def Dames Dope	"Ain't Nothing to It"
July 3	Eros Ramazotti	"Cose della vita"
July 10	Eros Ramazotti	"Cose della vita"
July 17	Eros Ramazotti	"Cose della vita"
July 24	UB40	"(I Can't Help) Falling in Love with You"
July 31	UB40	"(I Can't Help) Falling in Love with You"
August 7	UB40	"(I Can't Help) Falling in Love with You"
August 14	Culture Beat	"Mr. Vain"
August 21	Culture Beat	"Mr. Vain"
August 28	Culture Beat	"Mr. Vain"
September 4	Culture Beat	"Mr. Vain"
September 11	4 Non Blondes	"What's Up?"
September 18	4 Non Blondes	"What's Up"
September 25	4 Non Blondes	"What's Up"
October 2	Freddie Mercury	"Living on My Own"
October 9	Freddie Mercury	"Living on My Own"
October 16	4 Non Blondes	"What's Up"
October 23	4 Non Blondes	"What's Up"
October 30	4 Non Blondes	"What's Up"
November 6	Culture Beat	"Got to Get It"
November 13	Culture Beat	"Got to Get It"
November 20	Meat Loaf	"I'd Do Anything for Love (But I Won't Do That)"
November 27	Meat Loaf	"I'd Do Anything for Love (But I Won't Do That)"
December 4	Meat Loaf	"I'd Do Anything for Love (But I Won't Do That)"
December 11	Bryan Adams	"Please Forgive Me"
December 18	Bryan Adams	"Please Forgive Me"
December 25	Bryan Adams	"Please Forgive Me"

== See also ==
- 1993 in music
