= Mr. Vain =

1993 single by Culture Beat

- Standard CD single

Single by Culture Beat

from the album Serenity
- Released: 16 April 1993
- Genre: Eurodance; dance-pop; house
- Length: 5:37 (album version); 4:17 (single version)
- Label: Dance Pool
- Songwriters: Steven Levis; Nosie Katzmann; Jay Supreme
- Producer: Torsten Fenslau

Culture Beat singles chronology
"No Deeper Meaning" (1991)	"Mr. Vain" (1993)	"Got to Get It" (1993)

Audio sample
- file; help

Music video
- "Mr. Vain" on YouTube "Mr. Vain Recall" on YouTube

"Mr. Vain" is a song by German musical group Culture Beat, released in April 1993 by Dance Pool as the lead single from the group's second studio album, Serenity (1993). The song was written by Steven Levis, Nosie Katzmann and Jay Supreme, and produced by Torsten Fenslau. Tania Evans is the lead vocalist, and Supreme is the rapper. The female part of the lyrics describes the narcissist title character Mr. Vain, while the rap embodies his selfish desires.

"Mr. Vain" achieved success worldwide, reaching the number-one position in at least 19 countries, including Germany, Denmark, and Finland. In the United States, it peaked at number 15 on the Cash Box Top 100, number 17 on the Billboard Hot 100 and number two on the Billboard Dance Club Play chart. In 1994, the song earned an award at the German Echo Award, in the category for "Best International Dance Single" and an award in the category for "Best Hi-NRG 12-inch" at the WMC International Dance Music Awards in the US. Its accompanying music video, directed by Matt Broadley and filmed in Sweden, received heavy airplay on music television channels such as MTV Europe.

== Background ==
German DJ and producer Torsten Fenslau and his friend Jens Zimmerman formed Culture Beat in Frankfurt in 1989. They took the name from the idea of trying to mix high culture and music, and had their first hit same year, entitled "Der Erdbeermund" ("Strawberry Lips"), which meshed house sounds with the poetry of 15th century French writer François Villon. With the success of songs like "Rhythm Is a Dancer" by German group Snap! in 1992, which several critics later would compare "Mr. Vain" to, the formula for what would be known as 90s Eurodance was now beginning to establish. Fenslau wanted to develop the group further and American rapper Jay Supreme and British singer Tania Evans were recruited to front a new single and album. Supreme had moved to Germany after being in the US Army, while Evans had been working as backing singer for Neneh Cherry. The lyrics to "Mr. Vain" were written by German musician and songwriter Nosie Katzmann with Supreme and Steven Lewis, and the single was released on 16 April 1993.

== Critical reception ==
AllMusic editor William Cooper called "Mr. Vain" an "engaging house tune". He compared it to Snap!'s "Rhythm Is a Dancer" and Real McCoy's "Another Night" with its "instantly memorable keyboard hook". Larry Flick from Billboard magazine described it as a "chirpy rave/NRG track", stating that "if its European chart success is a fair indicator", then the song "will be all the rage within minutes." Nicole Leedham from The Canberra Times noted Culture Beat's "combination of soul, insightful lyrics and dance floor-friendly music". Student newspaper Columbia Daily Spectator stated that "near-indiscernible rapping over a pulsing techno beat and an unforgettable synth line" make it "the quintessential '90s dance track."

Tom Ewing of Freaky Trigger wrote that "Mr. Vain" "heads straight for the dark heart of the club, sketching a dancefloor predator who – like Eezer Goode [sic] – is as much metaphor as character. For drugs, lust, loss of control – who knows? The lyrics' almost-there English works to the song's benefit – there's an awkward poetry to "Call him Mr Raider, call him Mr Wrong" – and for once the obligatory rap isn't an embarrassment, with Jay Supreme's gloating, bassy flow reminding me of knowingly devilish Chicago house classics like "Your Only Friend". "Mr Vain" is the hustling flipside to "All That She Wants", and almost as good a pop record." John Patrick from Lake District News stated, "The beat is a dream to any dance and the words become so familiar, you can sing along with the chorus on cue."

In his weekly UK chart commentary, James Masterton said, "Stand by for the dance hit of the summer." He added that "although in actual fact as one of the best European dance records of the year so far it would probably have been a major hit anyway." Simon Price from Melody Maker viewed it as an "audacious rewrite" of "Rhythm Is a Dancer", and categorized it as "house music. Not rave, not techno, but good ol' rump-pumping Hi-NRG house." He also remarked, "When Evans purrs, "I know what I want, and I want it NOWWW", empires crumble." Diana Valois from The Morning Call noted its formula of "staccato beats, deep bass lines, and nervous and tinny keyboard riffs." She added, "Balancing the somber vocals of Jay Supreme is the optimistic soulfulness of a cheery Tania Evans".

Machgiel Bakker from Music & Media called "Mr. Vain" a "snappy and poppy dance groove". Alan Jones from Music Week declared the song as "maddeningly commercial but lyrically nonsensical", and with "hugely commercial hooks". Jim Farber from New York Daily News described it as "propulsive", with "snappy electronic rhythms and trendy rap break". He commented, "Musically, the song strongly recalls Snap!'s smash "Rhythm Is a Dancer", but its clash of two voices offers a fresh twist. One voice (provided by R&B singer Tania Evans) mockingly describes the ace narcissist "Mr. Vain", while a second (from a rapper named Jay Supreme) embodies the title character's selfish desire – it's a winkling comment on self-absorption on a track made for the indulgent world of dance clubs." In a 2014 retrospective review, Pop Rescue praised it as "fantastically catchy".

== Chart performance ==
"Mr. Vain" first experienced success in Germany, topping the German Singles Chart for nine consecutive weeks from June to August 1993, before spreading to other European countries. The song spent 33 weeks within the German Top 100. It also topped the charts of Austria, Belgium, Denmark, Finland, Ireland, Italy, the Netherlands, Norway, Switzerland and the United Kingdom. In the UK, the song reached number one during its fourth week on the UK Singles Chart, on 22 August 1993, after entering the chart at number 24. It was the first single to top the chart that was not released on 7-inch vinyl, spending four weeks at the top and 15 weeks inside the top 100 and selling more than 442,000 copies in the UK. It also topped the Music Week Dance Singles chart and reached number five on the UK Airplay chart. Additionally, "Mr. Vain" peaked at number two in Sweden for four weeks, and was a top-three hit in France, Iceland and Spain. The song debuted on the Eurochart Hot 100 at number 65 on 5 June, after charting in Germany. It peaked at number one 13 weeks later, on 28 August, and stayed at the top position for six consecutive weeks, before Haddaway's "Life" took over the top position at the chart.

Outside Europe, "Mr. Vain" peaked at number one in Australia, on the Canadian RPM Dance chart for 10 weeks and in Zimbabwe for a week. In the United States, the single reached number 15 on the Cash Box Top 100 and number 17 on the Billboard Hot 100, earning a gold certification by the Recording Industry Association of America (RIAA). "Mr. Vain" also peaked at number two for two weeks on the Billboard Dance Club Play chart. It also charted in Asia, peaking at number two in Israel for two weeks from 15 June, and number ten on the Japanese Oricon chart. The song earned a gold record in Austria, the Netherlands, Sweden, Switzerland and the UK, as well as a silver record in France. It was also awarded a double-platinum certification in Germany and a platinum record in Australia and Norway.

== Music videos ==
A music video was produced to promote the single, directed by Swedish-based director Matt Broadley for Apollon Bild&Film and filmed in Sweden. It features Evans and Supreme at a baroque house party populated by a mélange of powdered dandies and silver-vested ravers. The video begins with Supreme in black-and-white, looking at himself in a mirror, putting on a ring. As he looks into the mirror again, he sees the cracks in his face. He then attends the house party. Now in colours, people are dancing at the party and Evans sits in the corner of the room, seeing Supreme peeking by the curtain. He walks towards her and offers her his hand. She leaves, with him following her. Meanwhile, an epic arrangement of fruit is served at the party and it devolves into an hedonistic orgy of juice. As the video ends, after being followed through the hallway and up a dark staircase, Evans finds a hand-mirror lying on a nightstand and puts it up to Supreme's face. In black-and-white, his face becomes cracked and chipped again. The last shot depicts a white rocking horse rocking alone in a room littered with leaves. The video received heavy rotation on MTV Europe in July 1993. Broadley would also be directing the videos for Culture Beat's next singles, "Anything" and "World in Your Hands".

"Mr Vain Recall", with a new music video, was released in 2003.

== Impact and legacy ==
In 1994, the German Echo Award honored the song with an award in the category for "Best International Dance Single", and it also received an award in the category for "Best Hi-NRG 12-inch" at the WMC International Dance Music Awards in the US. Same year, Peter Paphides and Simon Price of Melody Maker praised songs such as "Rhythm Is a Dancer", "What Is Love" and "Mr. Vain" as modern classics, "butt-shaking Wagnerian disco monsters. Or, as someone else who knew a thing or two put it: Che Guevara and Debussy to a disco beat." In 2005, Freaky Trigger ranked "Mr. Vain" number 78 in their list of "Top 100 Songs of All Time".

In 2012, The Guardian featured it in their "Sounds of Germany: A History of German Pop in 10 Songs", writing, "Culture Beat's glorious "Mr Vain", with its rollicking beat, diva vocals and stilted rapping, comes as close as anything to summarising the spirit of the genre." Same year, Australian music channel Max included "Mr. Vain" in their list of "1000 Greatest Songs of All Time". In their "The ABC in Eurodance" in 2016, Finnish broadcaster Yle noted, "If someone could look up "The archetypal Eurodance hit song" in an Encyclopedia there would probably be a link to an audio file for "Mr Vain" - a song that more than anyone else came to define the 90's dance music." In 2017, BuzzFeed ranked it number 17 in their "The 101 Greatest Dance Songs of the '90s" list. In 2024, MTV 90s ranked "Mr. Vain" number four in their list of "Top 50 Rhythms of Eurodance".

== Track listings ==
- CD maxi single (Germany, 1993)
1. "Mr. Vain" (Vain Mix) – 6:35
2. "Mr. Vain" (Decent Mix) – 7:05
3. "Mr. Vain" (Special Radio Edit) – 4:17
- CD maxi single – Remix (Germany, 1993)
1. "Mr. Vain" (Mr. House) – 6:18
2. "Mr. Vain" (Mr. Rave) – 6:42
3. "Mr. Vain" (Mr. Trance) – 6:20
4. "Mr. Vain" (Mr. Hardcore) – 6:37
- CD maxi single (United States, 1993)
1. "Mr. Vain" (Radio Edit) – 4:17
2. "Mr. Vain" (Intense Radio Edit) – 3:52
3. "Mr. Vain" (Vain Mix) – 6:35
4. "Mr. Vain" (Mr. Intense) – 5:28
5. "Mr. Vain" (Mr. Hardcore) – 6:38
- 12-inch vinyl single (US, 1993)
1. "Mr. Vain" (Vain Mix) – 6:35
2. "Mr. Vain" (Mr. Club) – 6:39
3. "Mr. Vain" (Mr. Intense) – 5:28
4. "Mr. Vain" (Mr. Liebrand) – 5:40
5. "Mr. Vain" (Mr. Hardcore) – 6:38
- Cassette single (US, 1993)
1. "Mr. Vain" (Radio Edit) – 4:17
2. "Mr. Vain" (Radio Edit) (w/o Rap) – 4:17
- CD maxi single – (United Kingdom, 1993)
1. "Mr. Vain" (Special Radio Edit) – 4:17
2. "Mr. Vain" (Vain Mix) – 6:35
3. "(Cherry Lips) Der Erdbeermund" (Single Version) – 4:05
4. "I Like You" (Single Version) – 3:58
- CD maxi single – Remix (Japan, 1996)
1. "Mr. Vain" (FM 802 Rock Kids 802 Mix) – 4:25
2. "Mr. Vain" (Hyper Rave Mix) – 5:32
3. "Mr. Vain" (Tribal Mix) – 4:47
4. "Anything" – 6:26
5. "Mr. Vain" (Album Version) – 5:39
6. "Culture Beat Mega Mix" – 6:38

== Charts ==
=== Weekly charts ===
==== "Mr. Vain" ====
1993–1994 weekly chart performance for "Mr. Vain"
Chart (1993–1994)	Peak position
Australia (ARIA)	1
Austria (Ö3 Austria Top 40)	1
Belgium (Ultratop 50 Flanders)	1
Canada Top Singles (RPM)	40
Canada Dance/Urban (RPM)	1
Denmark (IFPI)	1
Europe (Eurochart Hot 100)	1
Europe (European Dance Radio)	1
Europe (European Hit Radio)	12
Finland (Suomen virallinen lista)	1
France (SNEP)	3
Germany (GfK)	1
Iceland (Íslenski Listinn Topp 40)	3
Ireland (IRMA)	1
Israel (Israeli Singles Chart)	2
Italy (Musica e dischi)	1
Japan (Oricon)	10
Japan (Oricon) Mr. Vain Remix! (mini-album)	6
Netherlands (Dutch Top 40)	1
Netherlands (Single Top 100)	1
New Zealand (Recorded Music NZ)	10
Norway (VG-lista)	1
Quebec (ADISQ)	27
Spain (AFYVE)	3
Sweden (Sverigetopplistan)	2
Switzerland (Schweizer Hitparade)	1
Switzerland (Schweizer Hitparade) Remix	10
UK Singles (Official Charts)	1
UK Airplay (Music Week)	5
UK Dance (Music Week)	1
UK Club Chart (Music Week)	26
US Billboard Hot 100	17
US Dance Club Play (Billboard)	2
US Maxi-Singles Sales (Billboard)	5
US Top 40/Mainstream (Billboard)	11
US Top 40/Rhythm-Crossover (Billboard)	20
US Cash Box Top 100	15
Zimbabwe (ZIMA)	1

2026 weekly chart performance for "Mr. Vain"
Chart (2026)	Peak position
Germany Dance (GfK)	16

==== "Mr. Vain Recall" ====
Weekly chart performance for "Mr. Vain Recall"
Chart (2003)	Peak position
Austria (Ö3 Austria Top 40)	8
Denmark (Tracklisten)	46
Finland (Suomen virallinen lista)	20
Germany (GfK)	7
Hungary (Dance Top 40)	7
Hungary (Single Top 40)	9
Netherlands (Single Top 100)	66
Romania (Romanian Top 100)	40
Sweden (Sverigetopplistan)	30
Switzerland (Schweizer Hitparade)	46
UK Singles (Official Charts)	51

=== Year-end charts ===
==== "Mr. Vain" ====
1993 year-end chart performance for "Mr. Vain"
Chart (1993)	Position
Australia (ARIA)	16
Austria (Ö3 Austria Top 40)	10
Belgium (Ultratop 50 Flanders)	5
Canada Dance/Urban (RPM)	1
Europe (Eurochart Hot 100)	6
Europe (European Dance Radio)	5
Europe (European Hit Radio)	38
Germany (Media Control)	4
Iceland (Íslenski Listinn Topp 40)	56
Netherlands (Dutch Top 40)	6
Netherlands (Single Top 100)	13
Sweden (Topplistan)	3
Switzerland (Schweizer Hitparade)	11
UK Singles (OCC)	10
UK Airplay (Music Week)	33

1994 year-end chart performance for "Mr. Vain"
Chart (1994)	Position
Brazil (Mais Tocadas)	29
US Billboard Hot 100	76
US Maxi-Singles Sales (Billboard)	33

==== "Mr. Vain Recall" ====
Year-end chart performance for "Mr. Vain Recall"
Chart (2003)	Position
Germany (Media Control GfK)	86

=== Decade-end charts ===
==== "Mr. Vain" ====
Chart (1990–1999)	Rank
Belgium (Ultratop 50 Flanders)	41
Netherlands (Dutch Top 40)	57

== Certifications ==
Certifications for "Mr. Vain"
Region	Certification	Certified units/sales
Australia (ARIA)	Platinum	70,000^{^}
Austria (IFPI Austria)	Gold	25,000^{*}
Denmark (IFPI Danmark)	Gold	45,000^{‡}
France (SNEP)	Silver	125,000^{*}
Germany (BVMI)	2× Platinum	1,000,000^{‡}
Netherlands (NVPI)	Gold	50,000^{^}
New Zealand (RMNZ)	Gold	15,000^{‡}
Norway (IFPI Norway)	Platinum	
Sweden (GLF)	Gold	25,000^{^}
Switzerland (IFPI Switzerland)	Gold	25,000^{^}
United Kingdom (BPI)	Platinum	600,000^{‡}
United States (RIAA)	Gold	500,000^{^}
^{*} Sales figures based on certification alone.^{^} Shipments figures based on certification alone.^{‡} Sales+streaming figures based on certification alone.

== Release history ==
Release dates and formats for "Mr. Vain"
Region	Version	Date	Format(s)	Label(s)	Ref.
Europe	"Mr. Vain"	16 April 1993	7-inch vinyl; 12-inch vinyl; CD	Dance Pool	
United Kingdom	"Mr. Vain"	26 July 1993	12-inch vinyl; CD; cassette	Epic	
Australia	"Mr. Vain"	2 August 1993	CD; cassette	Columbia; Dance Pool	
Japan	"Mr. Vain"	21 October 1993	CD	Epic	
Japan	"Mr. Vain"	30 June 1994	Remix CD	Epic	
Germany	"Mr. Vain Recall"	10 June 2003	CD	Superstar; Abfahrt; Fuel; EastWest	

== See also ==
- List of Dutch Top 40 number-one singles of 1993
- List of European number-one hits of 1993
- List of number-one hits of 1993 (Austria)
- List of number-one hits of 1993 (Germany)
- List of number-one hits of 1993 (Italy)
- List of number-one singles of 1993 (Ireland)
- List of number-one singles in Australia during the 1990s
- List of number-one singles of the 1990s (Switzerland)
- List of RPM number-one dance singles of 1993
- List of UK Singles Chart number ones of the 1990s
- VG-lista 1964 to 1994
- VRT Top 30 number-one hits of 1993
