= I Will Always Love You =

1974 single by Dolly Parton

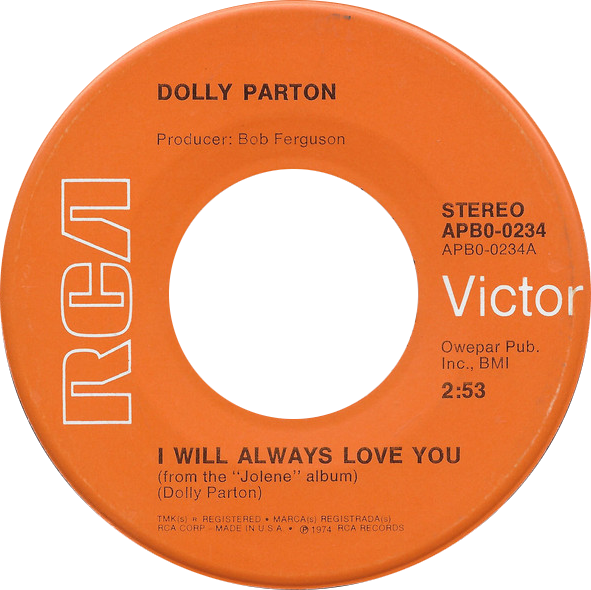
- Side A of the original 1974 U.S. single

Single by Dolly Parton

from the album Jolene
- B-side: "Lonely Comin' Down"
- Released: March 1974
- Recorded: 1973
- Studio: RCA Studio B, Nashville
- Genre: Country
- Length: 2:54
- Label: RCA Victor
- Songwriter: Dolly Parton
- Producer: Bob Ferguson

Dolly Parton singles chronology
"Jolene" (1973)	"I Will Always Love You" (1974)	"Love Is Like a Butterfly" (1974)

Audio
- "I Will Always Love You" on YouTube

"I Will Always Love You" is a song written and originally recorded in 1973 by American singer-songwriter Dolly Parton. Written as a farewell to her business partner and mentor Porter Wagoner, expressing Parton's gratitude and also her decision to pursue a solo career, the country single was released in 1974. The song was a commercial success for Parton, twice reaching the top spot of the US Billboard Hot Country Songs chart: first in June 1974, then again in October 1982, with a re-recording for The Best Little Whorehouse in Texas soundtrack.

Whitney Houston recorded a pop-ballad arrangement of the song for the 1992 film The Bodyguard. Houston's version peaked at number one on the Billboard Hot 100 for a then-record-breaking 14 weeks. The single was certified diamond by the RIAA, making Houston's first diamond single, the third female artist who had both a diamond single and a diamond album, and becoming the best-selling single by a woman in the U.S. The song was an enormous success worldwide, going number one in 34 official singles charts. With over 24 million copies sold worldwide, it became the best-selling single of all time by a female solo artist. It was also the world's best-selling single of 1992. Houston won the Grammy Award for Record of the Year and the Grammy Award for Best Pop Vocal Performance, Female in 1994 for "I Will Always Love You". Houston also won a Grammy Award for Album of the Year for The Bodyguard - Original Soundtrack Album.

The song has been recorded by many other artists including Linda Ronstadt, John Doe, Amber Riley, Kenny Rogers, LeAnn Rimes, Christina Grimmie, the cast of VeggieTales, and Sarah Washington, whose dance version reached number 12 on the UK Singles Chart. "I Will Always Love You" has been recognized by BMI for over ten million broadcast performances.

== Background and composition ==
"I Will Always Love You"
A 19-second sample of Parton's 1982 recording of "I Will Always Love You".

Country music singer-songwriter Dolly Parton wrote the song in 1973 for her mentor Porter Wagoner, from whom she was separating professionally after a seven-year partnership. She recorded it in RCA Studio B in Nashville on June 12, 1973.

Author Curtis W. Ellison stated that the song "speaks about the breakup of a relationship between a man and a woman that does not descend into unremitting domestic turmoil, but instead envisions parting with respect – because of the initiative of the woman". The country love track is set in a time signature of common time with a tempo of 66 beats per minute. (Larghetto/Adagio)

Although Parton found much success with the song, many people are unaware of its origin due to later versions. During an interview, Parton's manager Danny Nozel said: “one thing we found out from American Idol is that most people don't know that Dolly Parton wrote [the track]".

During an interview on The Bobby Bones Show, Dolly Parton revealed how she wrote her signature song "Jolene" on the same day she wrote "I Will Always Love You". Parton clarified later how early demo versions of both songs were recorded on the same cassette tape and might have been written “a few days apart”.

Several times (long before Whitney Houston recorded the song), Dolly Parton suggested to singer Patti LaBelle that she record "I Will Always Love You" because she felt LaBelle could have sung it so well. However, LaBelle admitted she kept putting off the opportunity to do so and later deeply regretted it after she heard Whitney Houston's rendition.

== 1974 version ==
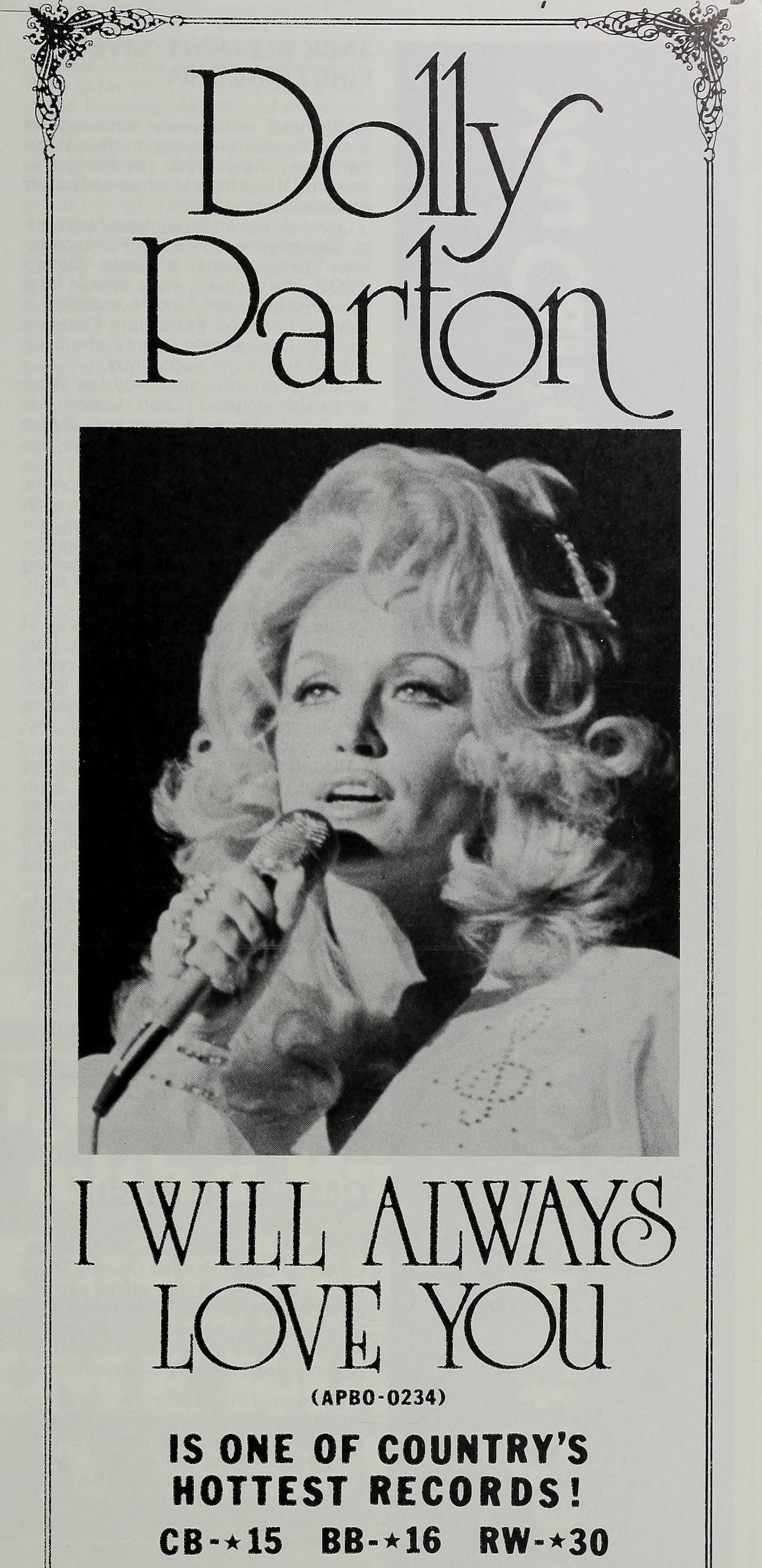
Cashbox advertisement, May 11, 1974

"I Will Always Love You" was released in March 1974, as the second single from Parton's thirteenth solo studio album, Jolene (1974). During its original release in 1974, "I Will Always Love You" reached number four in Canada on the Canadian RPM Country Tracks chart and peaked at number one on the Billboard Hot Country Songs chart, becoming one of the best selling singles of 1974.

When the 1974 recording of the song reached number one on the country charts, Elvis Presley indicated that he wanted to record the song. Parton was interested until Presley's manager, Colonel Tom Parker, told her that it was standard procedure for the songwriter to sign over half of the publishing rights to any song Elvis recorded. Parton refused. She recalls:

I said, 'I'm really sorry,' and I cried all night. I mean, it was like the worst thing. You know, it's like, 'Oh, my God… Elvis Presley.' And other people were saying, 'You're nuts. It's Elvis Presley.' […] I said, 'I can't do that. Something in my heart says, Don't do that .' And I just didn't do it[…] He would have killed it. But anyway, so he didn't. Then when Whitney [Houston's version] came out, I made enough money to buy Graceland.

The song won Parton Female Vocalist of the Year at the 1975 CMA Awards.

This version entered the Billboard Hot 100 charts in late August 2026 after Parton's death, debuting at number 27.

=== Critical reception ===
In Curtis W. Ellison's book, Country Music Culture: From Hard Times to Heaven (1995), he stated: "In the early 1990s, when ambiguity in romantic relationships accompanies changing expectations for both men and women, this song demonstrates Dolly Parton's appeal as a songwriter in the pop music market." Writer Paul Simpson stated that the track was written to "soften the blow" of Parton and Wagoner's split. Robert Christgau, reviewing Jolene, commented that "I Will Always Love You" "proves that sometimes she's a good [singer-songwriter]". In another review, he commented that the song's "writing gets mawkish" but Parton's voice compensated for it.

Retrospectively, AllMusic, in a review for the 2007 re-release of Jolene, described the song "one of her best performances". The Guardian praised the songwriting, and the 1974 version was "just as legendary" as Houston's later version. In 2026, Rolling Stone ranked the song Parton as Parton's third best, describing the song as an "unfeigned expression of gratitude". Billboard deemed "I Will Always Love You" Parton's best song and a "love song for the ages".

=== Track listing ===
- 7" vinyl
1. "I Will Always Love You" – 2:53
2. "Lonely Comin' Down" – 3:09

=== Credits and personnel ===
- Dolly Parton – vocals, guitar
- Jimmy Colvard – guitar
- Chip Young – guitar
- Stu Basore – pedal steel guitar
- Bobby Dyson – bass
- Larrie Londin – drums
- Buck Trent – banjo
- Bobby Thompson – banjo
- Mack Magaha – fiddle
- Johnny Gimble – fiddle
- Hargus "Pig" Robbins – piano
- Dolores Edgin – background vocals
- Hershel Winginton – background vocals
- Joe Babcock – background vocals
- June Page – background vocals

=== Charts ===
Weekly

Chart (1974)	Peak position
Canada Country Tracks (RPM)	4
US Hot Country Songs (Billboard)	1

Chart (2026)	Peak position
Global 200 (Billboard)	55
Israel International Airplay (Media Forest)	10
Japan Hot Overseas (Billboard Japan)	9
US Billboard Hot 100	27

Year-end

Chart (1974)	Position
US Hot Country Songs (Billboard)	22

== 1982 version ==
"I Will Always Love You"

Single by Dolly Parton

from the album The Best Little Whorehouse in Texas
- B-side: "Do I Ever Cross Your Mind"
- Released: July 12, 1982
- Recorded: c. February 1982
- Studio: RCA Studio A (Nashville)
- Genre: Country pop
- Length: 3:02
- Label: RCA
- Songwriter: Dolly Parton
- Producers: Dolly Parton; Gregg Perry

Dolly Parton singles chronology
"Heartbreak Express" (1982)	"I Will Always Love You" (1982)	"Do I Ever Cross Your Mind" (1982)

Film clip
- "I Will Always Love You" (1982) on YouTube

Audio
- "I Will Always Love You" (1982, from Greatest Hits) on YouTube

Parton re-recorded the song for The Best Little Whorehouse in Texas, released July 12, 1982, as the first single from the soundtrack album. The single eventually hit number one on the Billboard Hot Country Singles chart, earning Parton a rare distinction: reaching the number one position twice with the same song.

=== Critical reception ===
Billboard gave a positive review which said, "The first single from The Best Little Whorehouse in Texas isn't the sort of brassy main theme normally used to launch a major movie musical: here Parton reinterprets one of her earliest exercises in pure pop writing, and while older fans may be divided over the breathier, more stylized reading she offers here, the song itself is still a lovely ballad with a soaring chorus." Cashbox also reviewed the single favorably, saying that "hoisted over a building arrangement, Parton's vocals have never been more convincing or moving. The single choice from her Hollywood flick, The Best Little Whorehouse in Texas, the tune is sentiment wrapped in an appropriate package replete with strings, oboe and harp in addition to a delicate rhythm section."

=== Charts ===
Chart (1982)	Peak position
Australia (Kent Music Report)	72
Belgium (Ultratop 50 Flanders)	4
Canada Top Singles (RPM)	8
Canada Adult Contemporary (RPM)	1
Canada Country Tracks (RPM)	1
Netherlands (Single Top 100)	2
Sweden (Sverigetopplistan)	45
US Billboard Hot 100	53
US Adult Contemporary (Billboard)	17
US Hot Country Songs (Billboard)	1
US Cash Box Top 100	41

=== Certifications and sales ===
Region	Certification	Certified units/sales
Australia (ARIA)	Platinum	70,000^{‡}
New Zealand (RMNZ)	Gold	15,000^{‡}
United Kingdom (BPI)	Gold	453,162
United States (RIAA)	Platinum	1,000,000^{‡}
Streaming
Sweden (GLF)	Gold	4,000,000^{†}
^{‡} Sales+streaming figures based on certification alone.^{†} Streaming-only figures based on certification alone.

== 1995 version ==
"I Will Always Love You"

Single by Dolly Parton and Vince Gill

from the album Something Special
- B-side: "Speakin' of the Devil"
- Released: November 1995
- Recorded: 1995
- Genre: Country
- Length: 3:17
- Label: Columbia
- Songwriter: Dolly Parton
- Producers: Steve Buckingham; Dolly Parton

Dolly Parton singles chronology
"When You Tell Me That You Love Me" (1994)	"I Will Always Love You" (1995)	"Just When I Needed You Most" (1996)

Vince Gill singles chronology
"Go Rest High on That Mountain" (1995)	"I Will Always Love You" (1995)	"High Lonesome Sound" (1996)

Audio
- "I Will Always Love You" (1995) on YouTube

Parton recorded "I Will Always Love You" in 1995 as a duet with Vince Gill for her album, Something Special. Following an August 26 performance of the duet at the Grand Ole Opry which aired on TNN, radio stations began giving the duet unsolicited airplay, causing it to debut on the Billboard Hot Country Singles & Tracks chart at number 53. After a performance at the 29th Annual CMA Awards, the song was officially released as a single in November 1995, peaking at number 15. This marked the third time Parton had a top 20 hit with the song. The song was nominated at the 38th Annual Grammy Awards for Best Country Collaboration with Vocals and was named Vocal Event of the Year at the 30th Annual CMA Awards.

=== Personnel ===
Adapted from the album liner notes.

- Assa Dormi – concertmaster
- Paul Franklin – steel guitar
- Vince Gill – duet vocals
- Owen Hale – drums
- David Hungate – bass
- Brent Mason – guitar
- Terry McMillan – percussion
- Dale Oehler – string arrangements, conductor
- Dolly Parton – lead vocals
- Matt Rollings – piano
- Brent Rowan – guitar

=== Charts ===
Chart (1995)	Peak position
Canada Country Tracks (RPM)	22
US Hot Country Singles & Tracks (Billboard)	15

== Whitney Houston version ==
In 1992, American singer and actress Whitney Houston recorded a new arrangement of "I Will Always Love You" for the soundtrack to The Bodyguard, her film debut. Houston's cover of "I Will Always Love You" received widespread acclaim from music critics, being regarded as one of her "signature" songs. The single spent 14 weeks at the top of the US Billboard Hot 100, which at the time was a record. Houston's "I Will Always Love You" was also a massive international hit, topping the singles charts in almost every country, including the Eurochart Hot 100 Singles, where it spent 13 weeks at the top. The single ruled the summit position for ten weeks in Australia, five weeks in Austria, seven weeks for Belgium, eight weeks in France, six weeks in Germany, eight weeks in Ireland, six weeks in the Netherlands, fourteen weeks in New Zealand, nine weeks in Norway, one week in Spain and Uruguay, six weeks in Sweden, eight weeks in Switzerland, and ten weeks in the UK.

"I Will Always Love You" won the 1994 Grammy Awards for Record of the Year and Best Female Pop Vocal Performance, Houston's third win in the latter category after earlier wins in 1986 and 1988. In addition, it received Favorite Pop/Rock Single and Favorite Soul/R&B Single awards at the 21st American Music Awards, which was the first record by a solo female artist to win both categories. "I Will Always Love You" won two Japan Gold Disc Awards in 1993 for International Song of the Year, and a 1994 International Song of the Year Special Award for Japanese sales of over one million units. In 2020, "I Will Always Love You" was selected by the Library of Congress for preservation in the National Recording Registry for being "culturally, historically, or aesthetically significant". In 2021, "I Will Always Love You" was listed at number 94 on the updated list of Rolling Stone's 500 Greatest Songs of All Time. In 2023, "I Will Always Love You" was listed at number 60 on Billboard's list of the 500 Best Pop Songs of All Time, Houston's second highest-ranked song on the list. Parton herself publicly stated she liked Houston's cover of her song better than her own.

== Sarah Washington version ==
"I Will Always Love You"

Single by Sarah Washington
- B-side: "Body Heat"
- Released: August 2, 1993
- Genre: Garage house; hi-NRG
- Length: 5:27
- Label: Almighty; ZYX Music
- Songwriter: Dolly Parton
- Producers: Martyn Norris; Richard Cottle

Sarah Washington singles chronology
"I Will Always Love You" (1993)	"Careless Whisper" (1993)

British singer Sarah Washington released a dance-cover of "I Will Always Love You" in August 1993. It is produced by Martyn Norris and Richard Cottle, and became her highest-charting hit, reaching number three in Spain, number 12 in the UK, number 15 in Ireland, and number 32 in Sweden. On the Eurochart Hot 100, it peaked at number 44 in September 1993. It was released on Almighty Records, which described Washington as "an eager young hopeful" and cited her "sensational studio performance" as being key to the ultimate success of the track, also giving credit to London radio station 95.8 Capital FM and its heavy rotation of the song. A black-and-white music video was produced to promote the single, directed by Max Abbiss-Biro. In 2006, Almighty Records released an 11-mixes package of "I Will Always Love You".

=== Critical reception ===
Larry Flick from Billboard magazine commented, "There are no less than nine dance music covers of the Whitney Houston megahit 'I Will Always Love You'. So far, only Sarah Washington's hi-NRG rendering on Almighty Records is worth a spin." In his weekly UK chart commentary, James Masterton wrote, "If anything this new version adds a little more to the song, and at least proves it had genuine soul to start with. Top 10 for sure." Chris Roberts from Melody Maker added, "And now you can shake a tailfeather to it as well." Alan Jones from Music Week gave it a score of four out of five, complimenting "a sinewy garage groove with a powerful vocal from the Donna Summer school of disco divas." Stephen Dalton from NME felt the record "hop, skip and pump along with a breezy, good-natured charm." In his weekly dance column, James Hamilton from the Record Mirror Dance Update described it as a "'I Will Survive'-ish" remake.

=== Track listings ===
- CD single (Dance Mix), UK (1993)
1. "I Will Always Love You" (The Dolly Mix) – 6:20
2. "I Will Always Love You" (7" Edit) – 5:25
3. "I Will Always Love You" (Mighty Mix) – 7:26
4. "Body Heat" – 4:38
- CD single (Dance Mix), Scandinavia (1993)
1. "I Will Always Love You" (7" Edit) – 5:27
2. "I Will Always Love You" (12" Original Mix) – 7:27
- CD single (Dance Mix), Australia (1993)
1. "I Will Always Love You" (7" Edit)
2. "I Will Always Love You" (12" Original Mix)
3. "I Will Always Love You" (Luv'd Up Mix)
4. "Body Heat"

=== Charts ===
Chart (1993)	Peak position
Europe (Eurochart Hot 100)	44
Ireland (IRMA)	15
Spain (AFYVE)	3
Sweden (Sverigetopplistan)	32
UK Singles (OCC)	12
UK Airplay (Music Week)	22
UK Dance (Music Week)	11
UK Club Chart (Music Week)	19

== Kristin Chenoweth version ==
"I Will Always Love You"
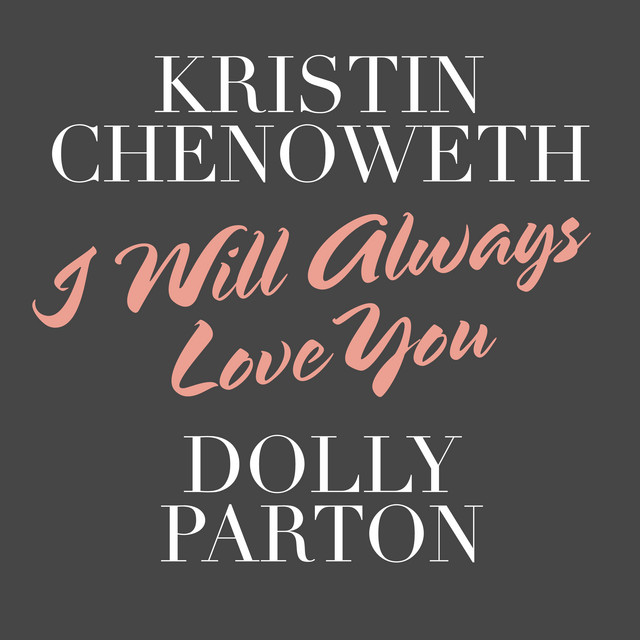

Single by Kristin Chenoweth and Dolly Parton

from the album For the Girls
- Released: August 9, 2019
- Recorded: 2019
- Genre: Pop
- Length: 3:22
- Label: Concord
- Songwriter: Dolly Parton
- Producers: Steve Tyrell; Jon Allen (co-producer)

Kristin Chenoweth singles chronology
"Dreams" (2011)	"I Will Always Love You" (2019)

Dolly Parton singles chronology
"Smoky Mountain Rain" (2019)	"I Will Always Love You" (2019)	"God Only Knows" (2019)

Audio
- "I Will Always Love You" on YouTube

"I Will Always Love You" was covered by American actress and singer Kristin Chenoweth as a duet with Dolly Parton. It was released on August 9, 2019, as the first single from Chenoweth's album, For the Girls.

=== Background ===
Chenoweth reflected on recording "I Will Always Love You" with ET Online, saying "it is a song I've loved since I was a child." She went on to say, "I used to think, 'One day I'm gonna sing that song.' Little did I know that I'd get to sing it with the queen herself."

== Other versions ==
The song found further chart success as part of the "Forever Country" medley, created in 2016 to celebrate the 50th anniversary of the Country Music Association Awards. The medley also features "Take Me Home, Country Roads" and "On the Road Again". Parton performs on the medley, along with 29 other country music artists. The medley debuted at number one on the Billboard US Hot Country Songs chart and number 21 on the Billboard Hot 100 chart on October 8, 2016.

In 2002, English pop singer Rik Waller took his own version of "I Will Always Love You" into the top ten of the UK Singles Chart, peaking at number 6. It was his debut single and the first released from his debut studio album From Now..., after his taking part in the Pop Idol series.

In 2012, Amber Riley covered this song on Glee in the episode "Heart" in their third season and the thirteenth episode as Mercedes Jones.

After Parton's passing on August 25, 2026, Vin Diesel sang an a cappella cover as a tribute to her.

== See also ==
- List of Australian number-one hits of 1993
- List of Austrian number-one hits of 1993
- List of number-one hits of 1993 (Belgium Flanders)
- List of RPM number-one singles of 1992
- List of RPM number-one singles of 1993
- Dutch Top 40 number-one hits of 1992
- Dutch Top 40 number-one hits of 1993
- List of European number-one hits of 1992
- List of European number-one hits of 1993
- List of French number-one hits of 1993
- Number-one hits of 1993 (Germany)
- List of number-one singles of 1992 (Ireland)
- List of number-one singles of 1993 (Ireland)
- List of number-one hits of 1992 (Italy)
- List of number-one singles in 1992 (New Zealand)
- List of number-one singles in 1993 (New Zealand)
- List of number-one songs in Norway
- List of number-one singles of 1993 (Spain)
- List of number-one singles and albums in Sweden
- List of number-one hits of 1993 (Switzerland)
- List of UK Singles Chart number ones of the 1990s
- List of Hot Adult Contemporary number ones of 1992 and 1993 (U.S.)
- List of Hot 100 Airplay number-one singles of the 1990s
- List of Billboard Mainstream Top 40 number-one songs of the 1990s
- List of Billboard Rhythmic number-one songs of the 1990s
- List of number-one R&B singles of 1992 (U.S.)
- R&B number-one hits of 1993 (USA)
- List of million-selling singles in the United Kingdom
- List of best-selling singles of the 1990s in the United Kingdom
- List of best-selling singles by year (UK)
- List of UK Singles Chart Christmas number ones
- List of UK top 10 singles in 1992
- List of best-selling singles in Australia
- List of Top 25 singles for 1992 in Australia
- List of Top 25 singles for 1993 in Australia
- Billboard Year-End Hot 100 singles of 1993
- List of Hot 100 number-one singles of the 1990s (U.S.)
- List of Billboard Hot 100 top 10 singles in 2012
- List of top 10 singles in 2012 (France)
- List of best-selling singles in Japan
- List of best-selling singles
- List of best-selling singles in the United States
