= List of number-one hits of 1993 (Austria) =

This is a list of the Austrian Singles Chart number-one hits of 1993.

Issue date	Song	Artist
3 January	"Die da!?"	Die Fantastischen Vier
10 January	"Die da!?"	Die Fantastischen Vier
17 January	"Would I Lie to You?"	Charles & Eddie
24 January	"I Will Always Love You"	Whitney Houston
31 January	"I Will Always Love You"	Whitney Houston
7 February	"I Will Always Love You"	Whitney Houston
14 February	"Would I Lie to You?"	Charles & Eddie
21 February	"I Will Always Love You"	Whitney Houston
28 February	"I Will Always Love You"	Whitney Houston
7 March	"No Limit"	2 Unlimited
14 March	"No Limit"	2 Unlimited
21 March	"No Limit"	2 Unlimited
28 March	"All That She Wants"	Ace of Base
4 April	"All That She Wants"	Ace of Base
11 April	"All That She Wants"	Ace of Base
18 April	"All That She Wants"	Ace of Base
25 April	"All That She Wants"	Ace of Base
2 May	"All That She Wants"	Ace of Base
9 May	"What Is Love"	Haddaway
16 May	"What Is Love"	Haddaway
23 May	"What Is Love"	Haddaway
30 May	"What Is Love"	Haddaway
6 June	"What Is Love"	Haddaway
13 June	"What Is Love"	Haddaway
20 June	"What Is Love"	Haddaway
27 June	"What Is Love"	Haddaway
4 July	"What Is Love"	Haddaway
11 July	"Mr. Vain"	Culture Beat
18 July	"(I Can't Help) Falling in Love With You"	UB40
25 July	"(I Can't Help) Falling in Love With You"	UB40
1 August	"(I Can't Help) Falling in Love With You"	UB40
8 August	"(I Can't Help) Falling in Love With You"	UB40
15 August	"What's Up?"	4 Non Blondes
22 August	"What's Up?"	4 Non Blondes
29 August	"What's Up?"	4 Non Blondes
5 September	"What's Up?"	4 Non Blondes
12 September	"What's Up?"	4 Non Blondes
19 September	"What's Up?"	4 Non Blondes
26 September	"What's Up?"	4 Non Blondes
3 October	"What's Up?"	4 Non Blondes
10 October	"What's Up?"	4 Non Blondes
17 October	"What's Up?"	4 Non Blondes
24 October	"What's Up?"	4 Non Blondes
31 October	"What's Up?"	4 Non Blondes
7 November	"What's Up?"	4 Non Blondes
14 November	"I'd Do Anything for Love (But I Won't Do That)"	Meat Loaf
21 November	"I'd Do Anything for Love (But I Won't Do That)"	Meat Loaf
28 November	"I'd Do Anything for Love (But I Won't Do That)"	Meat Loaf
5 December	"I'd Do Anything for Love (But I Won't Do That)"	Meat Loaf
12 December	"I'd Do Anything for Love (But I Won't Do That)"	Meat Loaf
19 December	"I'd Do Anything for Love (But I Won't Do That)"	Meat Loaf
26 December	"I'd Do Anything for Love (But I Won't Do That)"	Meat Loaf

== See also ==
- 1993 in music
