= List of European number-one hits of 1993 =

This is a list of the European Music & Media magazine's European Hot 100 Singles and European Top 100 Albums number-ones of 1993.

Issue date	Song	Artist	Album	Artist
2 January	"I Will Always Love You"	Whitney Houston	ABBA Gold: Greatest Hits	ABBA
9 January	"I Will Always Love You"	Whitney Houston	ABBA Gold: Greatest Hits	ABBA
16 January	"I Will Always Love You"	Whitney Houston	ABBA Gold: Greatest Hits	ABBA
23 January	"I Will Always Love You"	Whitney Houston	The Bodyguard (Soundtrack)	Whitney Houston
30 January	"I Will Always Love You"	Whitney Houston	The Bodyguard (Soundtrack)	Whitney Houston
6 February	"I Will Always Love You"	Whitney Houston	The Bodyguard (Soundtrack)	Whitney Houston
13 February	"I Will Always Love You"	Whitney Houston	The Bodyguard (Soundtrack)	Whitney Houston
20 February	"I Will Always Love You"	Whitney Houston	The Bodyguard (Soundtrack)	Whitney Houston
27 February	"I Will Always Love You"	Whitney Houston	The Bodyguard (Soundtrack)	Whitney Houston
6 March	"No Limit"	2 Unlimited	The Bodyguard (Soundtrack)	Whitney Houston
13 March	"No Limit"	2 Unlimited	The Bodyguard (Soundtrack)	Whitney Houston
20 March	"No Limit"	2 Unlimited	The Bodyguard (Soundtrack)	Whitney Houston
27 March	"No Limit"	2 Unlimited	The Bodyguard (Soundtrack)	Whitney Houston
3 April	"No Limit"	2 Unlimited	The Bodyguard (Soundtrack)	Whitney Houston
10 April	"No Limit"	2 Unlimited	The Bodyguard (Soundtrack)	Whitney Houston
17 April	"No Limit"	2 Unlimited	Songs of Faith and Devotion	Depeche Mode
24 April	"No Limit"	2 Unlimited	Songs of Faith and Devotion	Depeche Mode
1 May	"No Limit"	2 Unlimited	Songs of Faith and Devotion	Depeche Mode
8 May	"Informer"	Snow	The Bodyguard (Soundtrack)	Whitney Houston
15 May	"Informer"	Snow	The Bodyguard (Soundtrack)	Whitney Houston
22 May	"Informer"	Snow	The Bodyguard (Soundtrack)	Whitney Houston
29 May	"Informer"	Snow	Get a Grip	Aerosmith
5 June	"Tribal Dance"	2 Unlimited	Tutte Storie	Eros Ramazzotti
12 June	"What Is Love"	Haddaway	On The Night	Dire Straits
19 June	"What Is Love"	Haddaway	No Limits!	2 Unlimited
26 June	"What Is Love"	Haddaway	No Limits!	2 Unlimited
3 July	"What Is Love"	Haddaway	On the Night	Dire Straits
10 July	"What Is Love"	Haddaway	On the Night	Dire Straits
17 July	"What Is Love"	Haddaway	No Limits!	2 Unlimited
24 July	"What Is Love"	Haddaway	Zooropa	U2
31 July	"(I Can't Help) Falling In Love With You"	UB40	Zooropa	U2
7 August	"(I Can't Help) Falling In Love With You"	UB40	Zooropa	U2
14 August	"What's Up?"	4 Non Blondes	Zooropa	U2
21 August	"What's Up?"	4 Non Blondes	Zooropa	U2
28 August	"Mr. Vain"	Culture Beat	Zooropa	U2
4 September	"Mr. Vain"	Culture Beat	Zooropa	U2
11 September	"Mr. Vain"	Culture Beat	Zooropa	U2
18 September	"Mr. Vain"	Culture Beat	Bigger, Better, Faster, More!	4 Non Blondes
25 September	"Mr. Vain"	Culture Beat	Bigger, Better, Faster, More!	4 Non Blondes
2 October	"Life"	Haddaway	Bigger, Better, Faster, More!	4 Non Blondes
9 October	"Life"	Haddaway	Bigger, Better, Faster, More!	4 Non Blondes
16 October	"What's Up?"	4 Non Blondes	Bigger, Better, Faster, More!	4 Non Blondes
23 October	"Living On My Own (No More Brothers Mix)"	Freddie Mercury	Bigger, Better, Faster, More!	4 Non Blondes
30 October	"Living On My Own (No More Brothers Mix)"	Freddie Mercury	Very	Pet Shop Boys
6 November	"I'd Do Anything for Love (But I Won't Do That)"	Meat Loaf	Bat Out of Hell II: Back into Hell	Meat Loaf
13 November	"I'd Do Anything for Love (But I Won't Do That)"	Meat Loaf	Bat Out of Hell II: Back into Hell	Meat Loaf
20 November	"I'd Do Anything for Love (But I Won't Do That)"	Meat Loaf	Bat Out of Hell II: Back into Hell	Meat Loaf
27 November	"I'd Do Anything for Love (But I Won't Do That)"	Meat Loaf	Bat Out of Hell II: Back into Hell	Meat Loaf
4 December	"I'd Do Anything for Love (But I Won't Do That)"	Meat Loaf	Both Sides	Phil Collins
11 December	"I'd Do Anything for Love (But I Won't Do That)"	Meat Loaf	So Far So Good	Bryan Adams
18 December	"I'd Do Anything for Love (But I Won't Do That)"	Meat Loaf	So Far So Good	Bryan Adams
25 December	"I'd Do Anything for Love (But I Won't Do That)"	Meat Loaf	So Far So Good	Bryan Adams

== See also ==
- 1993 in music
- List of number-one hits in Europe
