= List of number-one singles of 1993 (Ireland) =

The following is a list of the IRMA's number-one singles of 1993.

Issue date	Song	Artist	Ref.
3 January	"I Will Always Love You"	Whitney Houston	
10 January	"I Will Always Love You"	Whitney Houston	
17 January	"I Will Always Love You"	Whitney Houston	
24 January	"This Time" / "Life Without You"	Chris Moore	
31 January	"This Time" / "Life Without You"	Chris Moore	
7 February	"This Time" / "Life Without You"	Chris Moore	
14 February	"This Time" / "Life Without You"	Chris Moore	
21 February	"This Time" / "Life Without You"	Chris Moore	
28 February	"No Limit"	2 Unlimited	
7 March	"No Limit"	2 Unlimited	
14 March	"No Limit"	2 Unlimited	
21 March	"No Limit"	2 Unlimited	
28 March	"No Limit"	2 Unlimited	
4 April	"Oh Carolina"	Shaggy	
11 April	"Young at Heart"	The Bluebells	
18 April	"Young at Heart"	The Bluebells	
25 April	"Informer"	Snow	
2 May	Five Live (EP)	George Michael & Queen with Lisa Stansfield	
9 May	Five Live (EP)	George Michael & Queen with Lisa Stansfield	
16 May	Five Live (EP)	George Michael & Queen with Lisa Stansfield	
23 May	"In Your Eyes"	Niamh Kavanagh	
30 May	"In Your Eyes"	Niamh Kavanagh	
6 June	"In Your Eyes"	Niamh Kavanagh	
13 June	"In Your Eyes"	Niamh Kavanagh	
20 June	"In Your Eyes"	Niamh Kavanagh	
27 June	"What Is Love"	Haddaway	
4 July	"What Is Love"	Haddaway	
11 July	"What Is Love"	Haddaway	
18 July	"What's Up?"	4 Non Blondes	
25 July	"What's Up?"	4 Non Blondes	
1 August	"What's Up?"	4 Non Blondes	
8 August	"What's Up?"	4 Non Blondes	
15 August	"What's Up?"	4 Non Blondes	
22 August	"Living on My Own"	Freddie Mercury	
29 August	"Mr. Vain"	Culture Beat	
5 September	"Mr. Vain"	Culture Beat	
12 September	"Mr. Vain"	Culture Beat	
19 September	"Mr. Vain"	Culture Beat	
26 September	"Mr. Vain"	Culture Beat	
3 October	"Go West"	Pet Shop Boys	
10 October	"Boom! Shake the Room"	DJ Jazzy Jeff & the Fresh Prince	
17 October	"I'd Do Anything for Love (But I Won't Do That)"	Meat Loaf	
24 October	"I'd Do Anything for Love (But I Won't Do That)"	Meat Loaf	
31 October	"I'd Do Anything for Love (But I Won't Do That)"	Meat Loaf	
7 November	"I'd Do Anything for Love (But I Won't Do That)"	Meat Loaf	
14 November	"I'd Do Anything for Love (But I Won't Do That)"	Meat Loaf	
21 November	"I'd Do Anything for Love (But I Won't Do That)"	Meat Loaf	
28 November	"Please Forgive Me"	Bryan Adams	
5 December	"Stay (Faraway, So Close!)"	U2	
12 December	"Stay (Faraway, So Close!)"	U2	
19 December	"Babe"	Take That	
26 December	"Babe"	Take That	

== See also ==
- 1993 in music
- List of artists who reached number one in Ireland
