= List of Dutch Top 40 number-one singles of 1993 =

These hits topped the Dutch Top 40 in 1993 (see 1993 in music).

Issue date	Artist	Song
2 January	Whitney Houston	"I Will Always Love You"
9 January	Whitney Houston	"I Will Always Love You"
16 January	Whitney Houston	"I Will Always Love You"
23 January	Whitney Houston	"I Will Always Love You"
30 January	Whitney Houston	"I Will Always Love You"
6 February	Whitney Houston	"I Will Always Love You"
13 February	Whitney Houston	"I Will Always Love You"
20 February	Roots Syndicate	"Mockin' Bird Hill"
27 February	Roots Syndicate	"Mockin' Bird Hill"
6 March	2 Unlimited	"No Limit"
13 March	2 Unlimited	"No Limit"
20 March	2 Unlimited	"No Limit"
27 March	2 Unlimited	"No Limit"
3 April	2 Unlimited	"No Limit"
10 April	René Klijn	"Mr. Blue"
17 April	René Klijn	"Mr. Blue"
24 April	René Klijn	"Mr. Blue"
1 may	René Klijn	"Mr. Blue"
8 may	René Klijn	"Mr. Blue"
15 may	Haddaway	"What Is Love"
22 may	Haddaway	"What Is Love"
29 may	Haddaway	"What Is Love"
5 June	Haddaway	"What Is Love"
12 June	Haddaway	"What Is Love"
19 June	Haddaway	"What Is Love"
26 June	UB40	"(I Can't Help) Falling in Love with You"
3 July	UB40	"(I Can't Help) Falling in Love with You"
10 July	UB40	"(I Can't Help) Falling in Love with You"
17 July	UB40	"(I Can't Help) Falling in Love with You"
24 July	UB40	"(I Can't Help) Falling in Love with You"
31 July	Culture Beat	"Mr. Vain"
7 August	4 Non Blondes	"What's Up?"
14 August	4 Non Blondes	"What's Up?"
21 August	4 Non Blondes	"What's Up?"
28 August	4 Non Blondes	"What's Up?"
4 September	4 Non Blondes	"What's Up?"
11 September	4 Non Blondes	"What's Up?"
18 September	4 Non Blondes	"What's Up?"
25 September	4 Non Blondes	"What's Up?"
2 October	4 Non Blondes	"What's Up?"
9 October	4 Non Blondes	"What's Up?"
16 October	Bitty McLean	"It Keeps Rainin' (Tears from My Eyes)"
23 October	Bitty McLean	"It Keeps Rainin' (Tears from My Eyes)"
30 October	Urban Cookie Collective	"The Key The Secret"
6 November	Meat Loaf	"I'd Do Anything for Love (But I Won't Do That)"
13 November	Meat Loaf	"I'd Do Anything for Love (But I Won't Do That)"
20 November	Meat Loaf	"I'd Do Anything for Love (But I Won't Do That)"
27 November	Meat Loaf	"I'd Do Anything for Love (But I Won't Do That)"
4 December	Meat Loaf	"I'd Do Anything for Love (But I Won't Do That)"
11 December	Meat Loaf	"I'd Do Anything for Love (But I Won't Do That)"
18 December	André van Duin	"Het pizzalied (Effe wachte...)"
25 December	André van Duin	"Het pizzalied (Effe wachte...)"

== See also ==
- 1993 in music
