= Def Dames Dope =

Belgian pop group

Def Dames Dope (DDD) was a girl group from Belgium during the 1990s, most successful from 1993 to 1996. They released one more single in 2002.

The group was initially made up of the two sisters Larissa and Axana Ceulemans together with Yousra Lemaire (nicknamed TRS). Larissa married Berre Bergen (who played bass guitar with the Belgian band De Kreuners), and left the group. Ingrid Gerits (nicknamed H_{2}O) and Edith Verlinden (nicknamed Tabasco) joined Def Dames Dope. Axana (nicknamed Snake) composed many of the lyrics and music, and the group was a project of techno producers Phil Wilde and Jean-Paul De Coster (better known for his project 2 Unlimited).

In the summer of 1993, the group held the number one position of the Belgium charts for 2 weeks and won the summer hit award from radio station Radio 2 with their song "Ain't Nothing To It". One of their notable lyrics included "Hey you, don't be silly, put a condom on your willy" from a 1994 single which made number 9 in the charts. Their first album sold gold.

In South Africa, the band was the opening act for a tour of La Toya Jackson. They made the charts in the Czech Republic, the United Kingdom, France, Canada (three number one hits) and Israel.

== Discography ==
=== Albums ===
- It's a Girl (1993)
- Wicked & Wild (1995)

=== Singles ===
- It's OK, All Right (1993) - AUS #158
- Ain't Nothing To It (1993)
- Having a Good Time (1993)
- Digging In The Nose (?)
- Out Of My Mind (1994)
- Don't Be Silly (1994)
- Show Me What You Got (1995)
- Feel Free (1995)
- Join The Party (1996)
- Beep Beep (2002)
