= List of number-one hits of 1993 (Germany) =

This is a list of the German Media Control Top100 Singles Chart number-ones of 1993.

== Number-one hits by week ==
Key
†	Indicates best-performing single and album of 1993

Issue date	Song	Artist	Ref.	Album	Artist	Ref.
4 January	"More and More"	Captain Hollywood Project		Gold: Greatest Hits	ABBA	
11 January	"More and More"	Captain Hollywood Project		Gold: Greatest Hits	ABBA	
18 January	"Would I Lie to You?"	Charles & Eddie		The Bodyguard: Original Soundtrack Album †	Whitney Houston / Various artists	
25 January	"I Will Always Love You"	Whitney Houston		The Bodyguard: Original Soundtrack Album †	Whitney Houston / Various artists	
1 February	"I Will Always Love You"	Whitney Houston		The Bodyguard: Original Soundtrack Album †	Whitney Houston / Various artists	
8 February	"I Will Always Love You"	Whitney Houston		The Bodyguard: Original Soundtrack Album †	Whitney Houston / Various artists	
15 February	"I Will Always Love You"	Whitney Houston		The Bodyguard: Original Soundtrack Album †	Whitney Houston / Various artists	
22 February	"I Will Always Love You"	Whitney Houston		The Bodyguard: Original Soundtrack Album †	Whitney Houston / Various artists	
1 March	"I Will Always Love You"	Whitney Houston		The Bodyguard: Original Soundtrack Album †	Whitney Houston / Various artists	
8 March	"All That She Wants"†	Ace of Base		The Bodyguard: Original Soundtrack Album †	Whitney Houston / Various artists	
15 March	"All That She Wants"†	Ace of Base		The Bodyguard: Original Soundtrack Album †	Whitney Houston / Various artists	
22 March	"All That She Wants"†	Ace of Base		The Bodyguard: Original Soundtrack Album †	Whitney Houston / Various artists	
29 March	"All That She Wants"†	Ace of Base		The Bodyguard: Original Soundtrack Album †	Whitney Houston / Various artists	
5 April	"All That She Wants"†	Ace of Base		Songs of Faith and Devotion	Depeche Mode	
12 April	"All That She Wants"†	Ace of Base		Songs of Faith and Devotion	Depeche Mode	
19 April	"All That She Wants"†	Ace of Base		Songs of Faith and Devotion	Depeche Mode	
26 April	"All That She Wants"†	Ace of Base		Songs of Faith and Devotion	Depeche Mode	
3 May	"Informer"	Snow		Songs of Faith and Devotion	Depeche Mode	
10 May	"Informer"	Snow		Songs of Faith and Devotion	Depeche Mode	
17 May	"Informer"	Snow		Happy Nation	Ace of Base	
24 May	"Informer"	Snow		Happy Nation	Ace of Base	
31 May	"Informer"	Snow		Kauf MICHǃ	Die Toten Hosen	
7 June	"Informer"	Snow		Chaos	Herbert Grönemeyer	
14 June	"Informer"	Snow		Chaos	Herbert Grönemeyer	
21 June	"Mr. Vain"	Culture Beat		Chaos	Herbert Grönemeyer	
28 June	"Mr. Vain"	Culture Beat		Chaos	Herbert Grönemeyer	
5 July	"Mr. Vain"	Culture Beat		Chaos	Herbert Grönemeyer	
12 July	"Mr. Vain"	Culture Beat		Chaos	Herbert Grönemeyer	
19 July	"Mr. Vain"	Culture Beat		Zooropa	U2	
26 July	"Mr. Vain"	Culture Beat		Happy Nation	Ace of Base	
2 August	"Mr. Vain"	Culture Beat		Zooropa	U2	
9 August	"Mr. Vain"	Culture Beat		Zooropa	U2	
16 August	"Mr. Vain"	Culture Beat		Bigger, Better, Faster, More!	4 Non Blondes	
23 August	"What's Up"	4 Non Blondes		Bigger, Better, Faster, More!	4 Non Blondes	
30 August	"What's Up"	4 Non Blondes		Bigger, Better, Faster, More!	4 Non Blondes	
6 September	"What's Up"	4 Non Blondes		Bigger, Better, Faster, More!	4 Non Blondes	
13 September	"What's Up"	4 Non Blondes		Bigger, Better, Faster, More!	4 Non Blondes	
20 September	"What's Up"	4 Non Blondes		Bigger, Better, Faster, More!	4 Non Blondes	
27 September	"What's Up"	4 Non Blondes		Bigger, Better, Faster, More!	4 Non Blondes	
4 October	"What's Up"	4 Non Blondes		Bigger, Better, Faster, More!	4 Non Blondes	
11 October	"What's Up"	4 Non Blondes		Bigger, Better, Faster, More!	4 Non Blondes	
18 October	"What's Up"	4 Non Blondes		Bigger, Better, Faster, More!	4 Non Blondes	
25 October	"What's Up"	4 Non Blondes		Very	Pet Shop Boys	
1 November	"Go West"	Pet Shop Boys		Very	Pet Shop Boys	
8 November	"Go West"	Pet Shop Boys		Very	Pet Shop Boys	
15 November	"Go West"	Pet Shop Boys		Very	Pet Shop Boys	
22 November	"I'd Do Anything for Love (But I Won't Do That)"	Meat Loaf		Bat Out of Hell II: Back into Hell	Meat Loaf	
29 November	"I'd Do Anything for Love (But I Won't Do That)"	Meat Loaf		Bat Out of Hell II: Back into Hell	Meat Loaf	
6 December	"I'd Do Anything for Love (But I Won't Do That)"	Meat Loaf		Both Sides	Phil Collins	
13 December	"I'd Do Anything for Love (But I Won't Do That)"	Meat Loaf		Both Sides	Phil Collins	
20 December	"I'd Do Anything for Love (But I Won't Do That)"	Meat Loaf		Both Sides	Phil Collins	
27 December	No release (Note: Same issue as for 20 December.)					
