= Angel (Ladadi O-Heyo) =

1995 single by Jam & Spoon

Single by Jam & Spoon featuring Plavka

from the album Tripomatic Fairytales 2001
- B-side: "Can You Feel It"
- Released: 1995
- Length: 3:48
- Label: JAM!; Dance Pool
- Songwriter: Nosie Katzmann
- Producers: Jam El Mar; Mark Spoon

Jam & Spoon singles chronology
"Find Me (Odyssey to Anyoona)" (1994)	"Angel (Ladadi O-Heyo)" (1995)	"Kaleidoscope Skies" (1996)

Music video
- "Angel (Ladadi O-Heyo)" on YouTube

"Angel (Ladadi O-Heyo)" is a song by German electronic music duo Jam & Spoon featuring American singer Plavka, released in 1995 by Epic, JAM! and Dance Pool as the fourth and last single from the duo's second album, Tripomatic Fairytales 2001 (1993). The song was written by German music writer Nosie Katzmann, who also wrote the duos former hits, "Right in the Night" and "Find Me (Odyssey to Anyoona)". "Angel" peaked at number two in Italy and number three in Finland. Additionally, it reached number 26 in the UK, number 28 in Switzerland, and number 30 in Germany. Marcus Nispel directed the accompanying music video.

== Critical reception ==
James Masterton for Dotmusic described the song as "more atmospheric meanderings" from Jam & Spoon. Pan-European magazine Music & Media wrote that the participation "is as simple as on Crystal Waters' 'Gypsy Woman (La Da Da La Da Dee)' and Lavinia Jones' 'Sing It To You (Dee-Doob-Dee-Doo)'. The flamenco bit is another hook."

== Music video ==
The music video for "Angel (Ladadi O-Heyo)" was directed by German director Marcus Nispel. It tells the story of two girls having sex with older men under hidden cameras. Then they are blackmailing those men with videotapes of the act. The girls drive around in a van and go to a cafe where they tear down the place, threatening people with guns. The police comes, surrounds the place and after the girls shoot a young man, the police attacks and a smoke grenade are sent into the cafe. At last, when the girls come out, one of them is being shot down, and the other arrested. In between this depiction, Plavka performs, looking at the camera through a porthole window. Two versions of the video were released: a censored and an uncensored version. "Angel (Ladadi O-Heyo)" was B-listed on German music television channel VIVA in May 1995. One month later, MTV Europe put it on buzz bin rotation.

== Track listings ==
- 12-inch single, Europe (1995)
1. "Angel (Ladadi O-Heyo)" (158 BPM Mix) – 8:59
2. "Can You Feel It" – 9:46
- CD single, UK (1995)
1. "Angel (Ladadi O-Heyo)" (Airplay Edit) – 3:48
2. "Angel (Ladadi O-Heyo)" (Airplay Edit #2) – 4:20
3. "Angel (Ladadi O-Heyo)" (La Fiesta Musical Mix) – 6:00
4. "Angel (Ladadi O-Heyo)" (Carl Cox Mix) – 6:25
5. "Angel (Ladadi O-Heyo)" (Pascha Mix) – 7:43
6. "Angel (Ladadi O-Heyo)" (Awex Mix) – 5:53
- CD maxi, Europe (1995)
1. "Angel (Ladadi O-Heyo)" (Airplay Edit) – 3:48
2. "Angel (Ladadi O-Heyo)" (Airplay Edit II) – 4:20
3. "Angel (Ladadi O-Heyo)" (158 BPM Mix) – 9:01
4. "Angel (Ladadi O-Heyo)" (150 BPM Mix) – 7:37
5. "Can You Feel It" – 9:49

== Charts ==
Chart (1995)	Peak position
Australia (ARIA)	59
Belgium (Ultratop 50 Flanders)	44
Europe (Eurochart Hot 100)	100
Europe (European Dance Radio)	1
Finland (Suomen virallinen lista)	3
Germany (GfK)	30
Israel (Israeli Singles Chart)	18
Italy (Musica e dischi)	2
Italy Airplay (Music & Media)	10
Netherlands (Dutch Top 40 Tipparade)	2
Netherlands (Single Top 100)	41
Scotland (OCC)	29
Switzerland (Schweizer Hitparade)	28
UK Singles (OCC)	26

== Release history ==
Region	Date	Format(s)	Label(s)	Ref.
Germany	1995	12-inch vinyl; CD	JAM!; Dance Pool	
Australia	26 June 1995	CD; cassette	Dance Pool	
United Kingdom	13 November 1995	12-inch vinyl; CD; cassette	Epic	
