= Justify My Love =

1990 single by Madonna

Single by Madonna

from the album The Immaculate Collection
- B-side: "Express Yourself"; "The Beast Within"
- Released: November 6, 1990
- Studio: Unique Recording Studio, New York
- Genre: Hip hop; dance; trip hop; trance; experimental pop
- Length: 4:58
- Label: Sire; Warner Bros.
- Songwriters: Lenny Kravitz; Ingrid Chavez; Madonna
- Producers: Lenny Kravitz; André Betts

Madonna singles chronology
"Hanky Panky" (1990)	"Justify My Love" (1990)	"Rescue Me" (1991)

Music video
- "Justify My Love" on YouTube

"Justify My Love" is a song by American singer Madonna from her first greatest hits album, The Immaculate Collection (1990). The song was written by Lenny Kravitz and Ingrid Chavez, with additional lyrics by Madonna; Kravitz also handled the production alongside André Betts. It was released as the lead single from The Immaculate Collection on November 6, 1990, by Sire and Warner Bros. Records. Initially, Chavez was not credited on the song; this led to a lawsuit against Kravitz that resulted in an out-of-court settlement. Influenced by hip hop, dance, trip hop, trance and experimental pop, it features spoken word vocals by Madonna touching on sexual fantasies and implying the position of a woman as the one sexually in control.

The song's commercial release was accompanied by different remixes; "The Beast Within" remix was condemned as anti-semitic by some Jewish organizations. "Justify My Love" received generally positive reviews by music critics, who appreciated Madonna and Kravitz's collaboration as well as its sensual nature, and was retrospectively noted as one of Madonna's best singles. The song was a commercial success, becoming Madonna's ninth number-one single on the US Billboard Hot 100, and also peaked at number one in Canada; it also reached the top 10 in several countries including Australia, Germany, Sweden and the United Kingdom.

The accompanying music video, shot in Paris and directed by Jean-Baptiste Mondino, is a tribute to the film Bay of Angels (1963). It features Madonna's then-boyfriend Tony Ward and portrays the singer as a woman walking in a hotel hallway, looking distressed and tired from work, until being seduced into having sex with a mysterious man and woman. The video contained imagery of sadomasochism, voyeurism and bisexuality, and was subsequently banned from MTV and other networks internationally due to its sexually explicit nature. In response, the video was released as a video single on VHS and became the first-ever short-form video to be certified multiplatinum in the US by the Recording Industry Association of America (RIAA).

"Justify My Love" and "The Beast Within" remix have been included on four of Madonna's concert tours, the last being 2023–2024's Celebration Tour. It was covered and sampled a number of times by artists such as Vita, Ashanti, and Jay-Z. The music video was parodied on an episode of Saturday Night Live and was also seen by critics as feminist, as well as considered one of the sexiest videos of all time by some publications. "Justify My Love" was included on Madonna's greatest hits albums Celebration (2009) and Finally Enough Love: 50 Number Ones (2022).

== Background and release ==
By the end of 1990, Madonna was ready to release her first greatest hits collection, titled The Immaculate Collection, after becoming the biggest female singles artist in history, with the most number-one and top-ten hit songs by a woman in both the United States and the United Kingdom. According to J. Randy Taraborrelli, author of Madonna: An Intimate Biography, the release was "much more than a mere collection of Madonna's biggest-selling and most popular songs". The singer regarded it as a "proud landmark" of her career, which had progressed upwards since she broke out in the music scene in 1983. Following the completion of 1990's Blond Ambition World Tour, Madonna began rushing the project, aiming to release it in time for the year's Christmas season. On October 13, 1990, Billboard magazine confirmed that Madonna had been working on new material for the album with Shep Pettibone and Lenny Kravitz. The collection had 15 of Madonna's previously released singles, and two new songs, "Justify My Love" and "Rescue Me", were included in order to generate the public's interest.

"Justify My Love" was released as the lead single from The Immaculate Collection on November 6, 1990. It was issued in Australia on November 19, in the UK on December 1, and in Japan on December 10. The artwork for the single, photographed by Patrick Demarchelier and directed by Jeri Heiden, features a picture of Madonna aggressively leaning forward, wearing a sleeveless waistcoast with her hair scrunched up under a black cap, an aggressive expression on her face, and a cigarette hanging out of her lips. Carol Clerk, author of Madonnastyle, opined that "it was a particularly masculine pose; Madonna, at times, could look as butch as the next man". The picture had previously appeared on the cover of an Interview magazine issue which featured an interview with Madonna, and later was removed from the French version of the single. Afterwards, the song was included on Madonna's third greatest hits album Celebration (2009), and as a remixed form on Finally Enough Love: 50 Number Ones (2022).

== Development ==
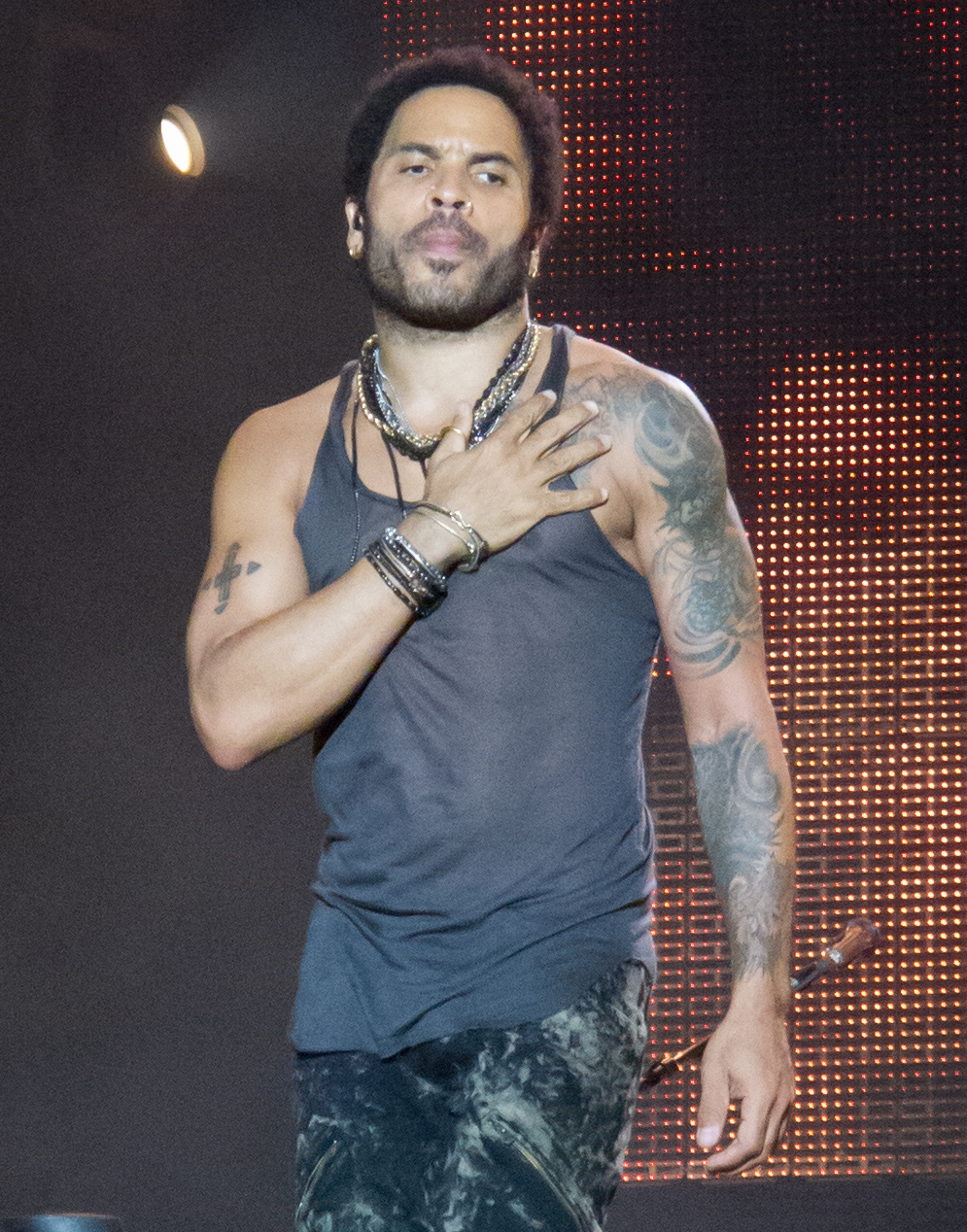
Lenny Kravitz co-wrote and produced "Justify My Love".

"Justify My Love" was written by singer and songwriter Ingrid Chavez as a love letter dedicated to Kravitz, who was having an affair with her at the time. He invited her over to a studio where he was producing tracks with André Betts, and then recorded the letter in one take. Kravitz took a master copy of the song to Virgin Records, as their relationship ended some time later. Months later, he told Chavez that Madonna would release "Justify My Love" and asked her to sign a document saying that she would receive 12.5% publishing royalties, but no credit. She eventually signed the paper and was then invited to meet Madonna in the studio while they mixed the track, and was impressed by how she copied her vocals exactly from the demo version; Chavez thought that "maybe she just felt like she didn't want another woman to take credit for the creative style of the vocal".

Upon the song's release, Chavez filed a lawsuit against them, claiming the only words Kravitz wrote were "justify my love", while Madonna changed one line. It was also reported that she only received a US$500 advance after Kravitz pressured her to sign an agreement surrendering credit and three-quarters of royalties. He admitted that Chavez had written part of the lyrics, but both had agreed not to credit her for personal and professional reasons, and accused her of trying to "make like she did the whole thing" upon the single's success. She responded by stating that the reason was because he was afraid his wife would think they were having an affair. They eventually reached an out-of-court settlement whereby she received 12.5% percent of royalties and her name on the next pressings. However, her name does not appear on any compilations containing the song. Betts also sued Kravitz, claiming he was promised co-producer credit and half of any producer's royalties, but received an associate producer's credit and was not paid for his work.

Kravitz recalled that he had been working on demos, and the demo version of "Justify My Love" came up. At first, he thought it was "super-sexy and hard at the same time. I just felt it. I just knew that there was something very special about the track and the minimum quality, because it was so minimal. Just a gut thing". However, he "knew it wasn't for me", but thought it would be perfect for Madonna, and phoned her saying he had a number-one song for her. The same day, they met in New York City, where Kravitz played the demo for her. After listening to the song multiple times, Madonna agreed on recording, and both started working on it the next day. Kravitz described the recording session as "just the two of us and my engineers, and it happened in one day. It was very quick", adding it was fun and "all very authentic".

== Composition ==
"Justify My Love" was written by Kravitz and Chavez, with additional lyrics by Madonna; he also produced the song alongside André Betts. It was recorded by Henry Hirsch, David Domanich, Andy Cardenas, and Josh Cuervokas at Waterfront Studios in London, and Unique Recording Studios in New York City. Ted Jensen mastered the song at Sterling Sound Studios, while it was mixed by Shep Pettibone and Goh Hotoda at Guerilla Studios in London. The mixing was done in QSound, which at that time was a new audio filter to create a three-dimensional sound effect. This was employed on all of Madonna's past hits present on The Immaculate Collection.

'Justify My Love'
A 30 second sample of the song, where Madonna sings the song's chorus, uttering the words "wanting, needing, waiting" before the double-tracked line "for you to justify my love".

"Justify My Love" is set in common time with a moderate tempo of 132 beats per minute. Composed in the key of B minor, Madonna's vocal range spans from A_{4} to D_{5}. It follows the chord progression of E5–F♯5–E5–F♯5 during the opening melody. Musically, it is a hip hop, dance, trip-hop, trance, and experimental pop song, which features spoken word vocals by Madonna and Kravitz's "moans" on background vocals. It contains a drum sample of Public Enemy's "Security of the First World" (1988) used initially without consent, and the group threatened to take legal action against both singers; however, music industry members believed the drum beat was sampled from James Brown's single "Funky Drummer" (1970), but these claims were denied by the group's producer, Hank Shocklee. A spokeswoman for Madonna said she never had heard their song and "didn't write the music" for "Justify My Love", while Kravitz dismissed the claims by saying, "It's just one of those beats you find on the floor somewhere."

Lyrically, "Justify My Love" was described as a "spoken-word ode to releasing your inner freak". Madonna starts singing the lines "I wanna kiss you in Paris, I wanna hold your hand in Rome, I wanna run naked in a rainstorm, make love in a train... cross country". The chorus changes its atmosphere, as the singer's breathing vocals initially punctuate the "wanting, needing, waiting" line, which prefaces the double-tracked "for you to justify my love", with the words "my love" being repeated in the background. The second verse begins with her uttering "OK", suggesting a move in direction, reflected by the line "I wanna know you... no, not like that". On the next verse, Madonna utters the lines "Talk to me, tell me your dreams / Am I in them? Tell me your fears / Are you scared? Tell me your stories", implying the position of a woman sexually in control, which is reinforced by the line "Poor is the man whose pleasures depend upon the permission of another", with its underlying connotations of domination through the lyrics "Love me, that's right, love me / I wanna be your baby". Scholar Sheila Whiteley noted in her book Women and Popular Music: Sexuality, Identity, and Subjectivity that the song's lyrics "imply an overall focus on sexual fantasy" with "implicit S&M of pleasuring allied to permission", suggesting that certain pleasures need to be justified.

Taraborrelli described the composition as "rather simple – a funky, drum pattern under a droning, aural synthesizer pad, with Madonna speaking sexy verses over the music, Kravitz casually moaning a melody in the background". In a similar vein, Rikky Rooksby wrote on his book Madonna: The Complete Guide to Her Music that the elements on the song were "simple enough: a drum loop that repeats for the duration of the song, a bass part, and a descending four chord sequence moving from F♯ minor to B minor", whose melody "doesn't exactly go anywhere, but it creates a hypnotic atmosfere which supports the imagery of the lyric". Santiago Fouz-Hernández and Freya Jarman-Ivens, in their book Madonna's Drowned Worlds, stated that it was "far from an ordinary pop song", featuring "a very simple tonal structure and the same bassline", with the same chords repeated over and over. They also noted its "little melodic interest", with Madonna speaking more than she sang through her "distant, remote, 'elsewhere'" androgynous vocals. Tom Breiham from Stereogum later classified "Justify My Love" as "an early example of trip-hop", and pointed out that Madonna deserves credit for "anticipating whole new trends before they even happened."

=== "The Beast Within" ===
"Justify My Love" received a remix titled "The Beast Within", and was included on some versions of the single. Musically influenced by Eastern music, the remix featured only the chorus and certain lines of the original song, as most of the verses were replaced by passages from the Book of Revelation from the Bible. At the time, Madonna told The Village Voice that "the beast within" was Saddam Hussein and that the mix was inspired by "the impending war in the Middle East", ostensibly the Gulf War. About a third of the way into the six-minute song, Madonna reads the line "I know your tribulation and your poverty and the slander of those who say that they are Jews, but they are not. They are a Synagogue of Satan", which was deemed anti-semitic by some Jewish organizations. According to Rabbi Abraham Cooper, associate dean of the Simon Wiesenthal Center in Los Angeles, "When we saw those lyrics the alarm bell went off", as "the impact of having America's leading cultural icon say those lyrics can give a powerful tool to bigots". He also commented, "Anti-Semitism is a real problem in America today and an entertainer as big of a blockbuster as Madonna should show some responsibility to such social issues." Cooper sent a letter to the singer's management, and initially asked for the line to be removed from the song. Madonna was reportedly shocked by the controversy, calling the accusations "ridiculous" and stating: "People can say I am an exhibitionist, but no one can ever accuse me of being a racist". She then elaborated that it was "a commentary on evil in general": "The song is, after all, about love." The rabbi replied that she responded quickly to the issue, and was relieved that she did so.

== Critical response ==
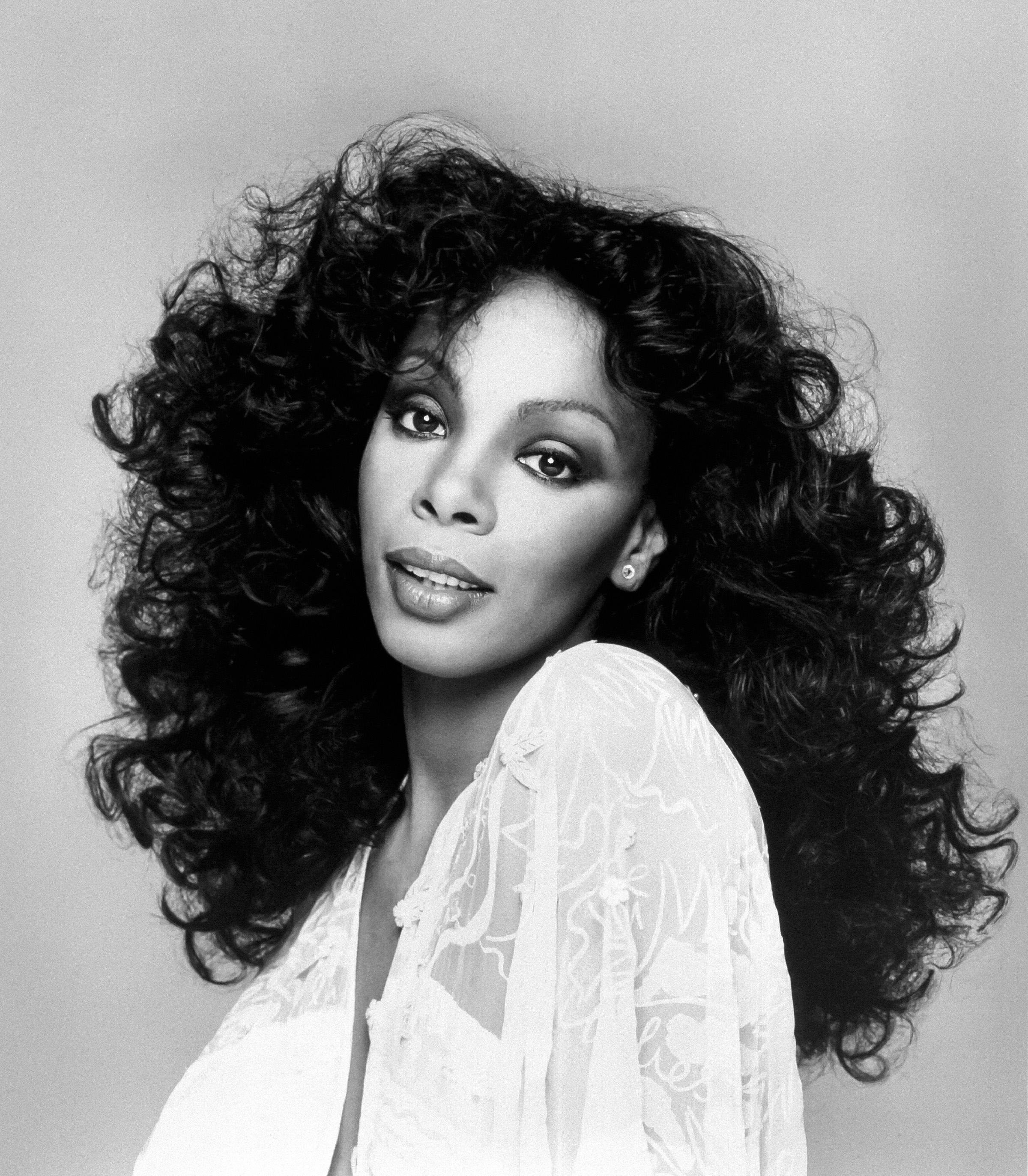
"Justify My Love" was compared to Donna Summer's (pictured) tracks by Billboard and the Knoxville News-Sentinel.

"Justify My Love" has been met with generally positive responses from music critics. Larry Flick of Billboard magazine gave a positive review, calling it a "brilliantly conceived jam", which would be "devoured by club DJs" and "may test the devotion of top 40 radio programmers". Another review from the same magazine stated that the song was a "steamy" collaboration between Madonna and Kravitz, and it had "the juice to become the '90s equivalent of Donna Summer's 'Love To Love You Baby'", and noted that it "strays miles away from the chirpy pop of her past." Chuck Campbell from the Knoxville News-Sentinel said it was "so seductive it makes George Michael's 'I Want Your Sex' and Donna Summer's 'I Feel Love' sound like nursery rhymes". Music & Media staff commented that the "unlikely" collaboration of Madonna and Kravitz was a "marriage made in heaven", as well as "atmospheric, yet brutal in an unconventional manner". On her biography of the singer, author Lucy O'Brien stated that the track "opened up a new creative avenue for Madonna, as she moved into more 'adult' territory". Similarly, Rooksby wrote that "Justify My Love" was a pivotal record for the singer, pointing her musical direction into the 1990s decade, giving her old disco sound "the kiss of death". Select's Andrew Harrison considered the song "breathy, pulsing and overpoweringly sexy", which, along with "Rescue Me", played on Madonna's "ambiguous vulnerability, the disqueting mix of sexual predation and submission that gives Madonna's records an edge where Paula Abdul's just have a verse and chorus". Taraborrelli commented that the track "oozed pungent sex, it was just that passionate", while J.D. Considine of The Baltimore Sun noted its "simmering passion".

In an album guide for Rolling Stone, "Justify My Love" was described along with "Rescue Me" as "worthy sensual newies" on The Immaculate Collection. Matthew Rettenmund, author of Encyclopedia Madonnica, opined that the track "foreshadowed Madonna's long-term commitment to explicitly politi-sexual art in the wake of an already suggestive career", and that "it sounded like nothing else on the airwaves at the time". He also opined that along with "Rescue Me", it was disappointing that the tracks were "originated on a best-of" album. Danny Eccleston from Q opined that "Justify My Love" had a "hard-faced sexiness", while Music Week staff called it a "mumbling sexy judderer". For Tony Power of Blender, the song was "preposterously sexy", and he picked it as one of the standout tracks on The Immaculate Collection. Fouz-Hernández and Jarman-Ivens wrote that Madonna's style of singing on the track seemed controlled and distant, and added that "the background moaning, which is intended to remind the listener of copulation, is a key memorable feature". Writing for Entertainment Weekly, Jim Farber described the song as "some vague, tuneless phrases chanted in Madonna's most breathless voice over a minimal house groove-serves mainly to justify the visuals"; while reviewing The Immaculate Collection, David Browne from the same magazine called it "instantly notorious" but noted that along with "Rescue Me", it did not "[break] new ground for her". In 1992, "Justify My Love" won a ASCAP Pop Music Award for "Most Performed Song".

While analyzing The Immaculate Collection, Drew Mackie of People consisidered the song a "sexy, daring track that's not quite like anything Madonna had released before". Katharine Birbalsingh from The Daily Telegraph opined that it was an "insistent, sexy trance track". James Rose of Daily Review noted that with the song Madonna began "a phase of her career that oscillates between cynical self-exploitation and courageous self-expression. Raunchy videos, explicitly themed lyrics and boudoir beats became de rigueur for the lady now arguably bearing the biggest name in popular music." In a review for Celebration, Eric Henderson of Slant Magazine called the track "aromatic" and "considered by most fans to be among the singer's best work". According to The A.V. Club's Eric Diaz, it remained "one of Madonna's sexiest bangers, setting the stage not only for her still-underrated Erotica era but her tireless capacity to transform and provoke". Justin Myers from Official Charts Company considered the track "filthy for the time but pretty tame now". Additionally, "Justify My Love" was classified her 12th best on Madonna's top 20 singles of all-time list by Q magazine, as well as placed at number 842 in the list of the "1001 Best Songs Ever" by the same publication.

== Chart performance ==
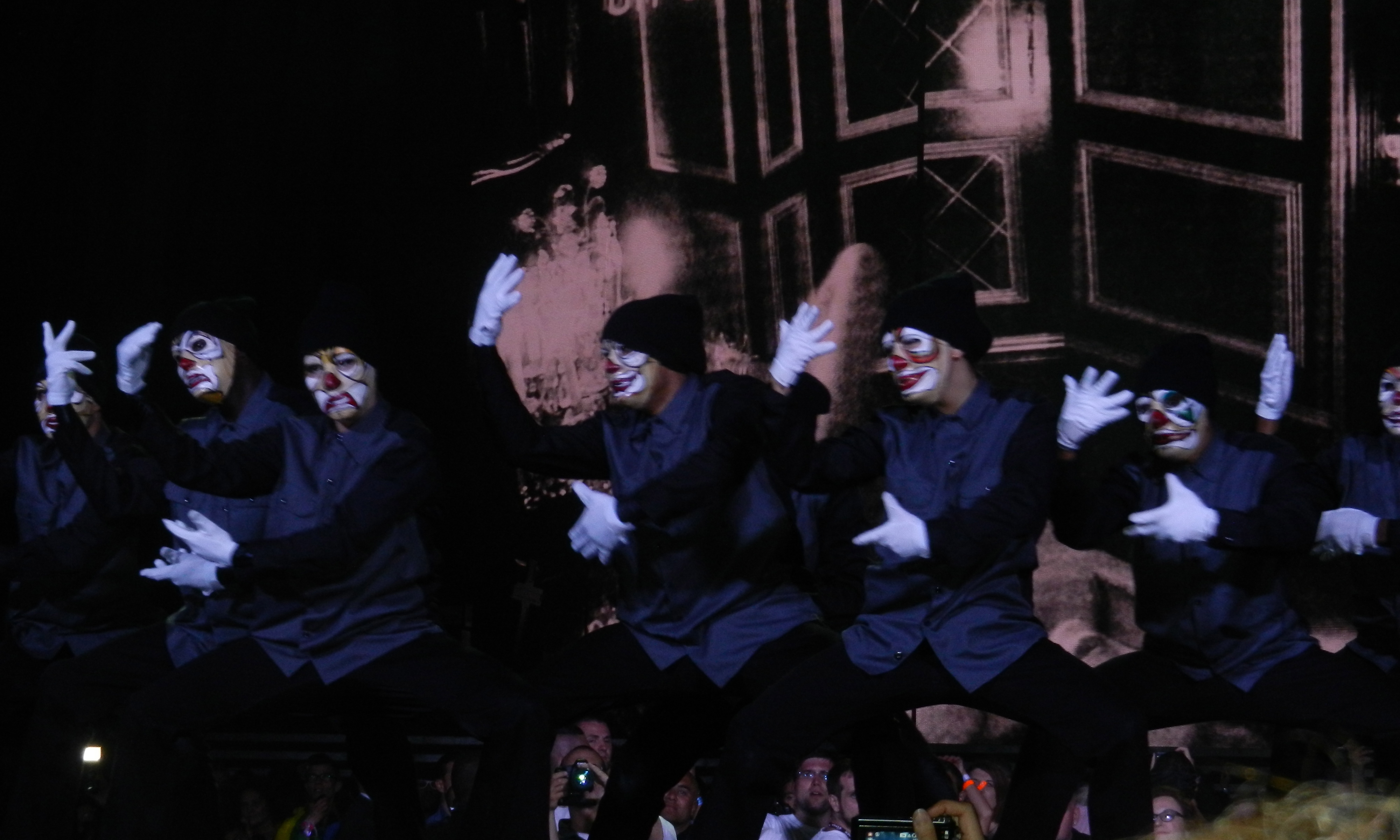
The song became Madonna's ninth number-one single on the Billboard Hot 100. In the image, dancers are seen performing during the "Justify My Love" video interlude on The MDNA Tour in 2012.

In the US, "Justify My Love" debuted at number 46 on the Billboard Hot 100 singles chart, on the issue dated November 17, 1990. Eight weeks later, the song reached number one, becoming Madonna's ninth number-one single on the chart, staying in the summit for two weeks. It also topped Billboard's Dance Club Play chart and peaked at number 42 on the Hot R&B Singles chart. On February 22, 1991, the song was certified platinum by the Recording Industry Association of America (RIAA) for shipments of over a million units in the US. In 1991, "Justify My Love" ranked at number 21 on the year-end Billboard Hot 100 chart. In Canada, the song debuted at number 12 on the RPM 100 Hit Tracks chart and reached the top on the week dated February 2, 1991. The track eventually received a gold certification by Music Canada (MC) for shipments of 50,000 copies in the region.

In Australia, "Justify My Love" debuted at number 14 on the ARIA Singles Chart on December 2, 1990. The next weeks, it peaked at number four, staying in the position for two weeks. The single was present for a total of 12 weeks on the chart, and was certified gold by the Australian Recording Industry Association (ARIA) for shipments of 35,000 copies of the single. In New Zealand, the song had a similar run as to Australia, debuting at number 22 on the RIANZ Singles Chart, and peaking at number five for two consecutive weeks.

In the UK, the track debuted at number nine on the week ending on December 8, 1990, and reached number two a week later. It was also certified silver by the British Phonographic Industry (BPI) on December 1, 1990, for shipments of over 200,000 copies in the UK. As of August 2017, the song had sold 275,500 copies in the region and was Madonna's 23rd best selling single there. The song also achieved success in other parts of Europe. In Austria, "Justify My Love" debuted at number 21 on the week of January 13, 1991, before peaking at number nine within a month. On December 17, 1990, the song debuted at number 50 in Germany, eventually peaking at number 10 for two weeks. The song debuted at number 16 in Sweden, later reaching number eight. In Switzerland, it experienced more success, debuting at number 12 on January 13, 1991, and peaking at number three for two weeks. The song's commercial performance in the European countries helped it attain a peak of number three on the Eurochart Hot 100, on the issue dated January 12, 1991.

== Music video ==
=== Development ===
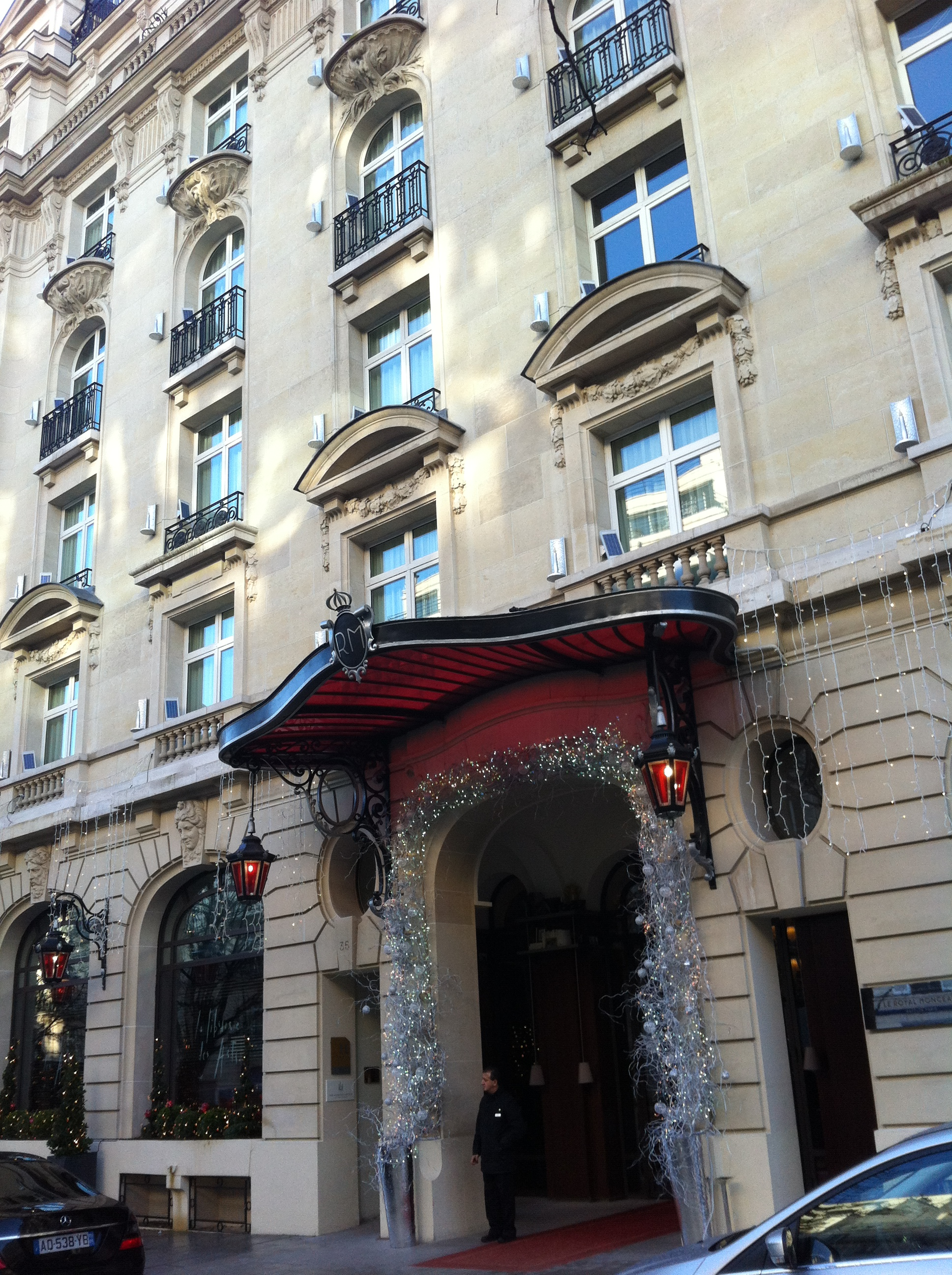
The music video was filmed at the Royal Monceau hotel in Paris.

The music video for "Justify My Love" was filmed within three days in November 1990 at the Royal Monceau Hotel in Paris, France. It was directed by Jean-Baptiste Mondino, who had previously directed the video for Madonna's "Open Your Heart" (1987). The clip was produced by Philippe Dupuis-Mendel under Bandits, in a co-production with Propaganda Films, with editing by Oliver Gajan and principal photography by Pascal Lebegue. The video features Madonna's then-boyfriend Tony Ward, fellow models Amanda Cazalet and Wallis Franken Montana, as well as Jose Gutierez Xtravaganza, who was a dancer on the Blond Ambition World Tour which occurred earlier that year. It is a tribute to the film Bay of Angels (1963). Mondino described the concept of the music video:

I've worked with Madonna a few times now, and there's more to her than people think. She's a great actress. So I wanted to do something less glamorous, less slick, more real. I wanted to put the paparazzi out of work. How can a picture of Madonna and Tony together be surprising when you've already seen them together half-naked in a video? [..] It was very cheap, very easy. It's very real — that's what's so shocking about it. And maybe her kissing a woman... but that's part of our society. And with AIDS, shouldn't we celebrate kissing as a beautiful thing?

Mondino did an experience for the video, locking the entire crew into a hotel for three days and two nights, setting no rules, and nobody was allowed to go out. The entire top floor with 15 rooms was rented, and also served as makeup and wardrobe rooms; they had no deadline, as opposed to a regular video. He explained that he did not have any concept, except for the idea that Madonna arrived in the hotel tired and broken, and left full of energy. The director recalled that by the end of it, he was unable to differentiate the real from the performed as they were not following a script. He described the shooting as "very quiet, it was very gentle, we were all very sweet to each other", and said "we were talking, chatting, laughing, playing the music, shooting and when people were tired they went to bed". Mondino commented that the last day when he was supposed to go home, he felt strange, and wondered if he had to go back home or not, as he thought it was a dream rather than a video shooting. In 2013, during a Q&A session with Reddit users, Madonna revealed it was her favorite music video to make.

=== Synopsis ===
The theme of androgyny is alluded to when two women are seen in men's clothing and with drawn-on moustaches.

The video was filmed in grainy black and white. It opens with a dancer in a black bodysuit dancing to the camera, cutting to Madonna walking down a hotel hallway, looking tired. She is dressed in an overcoat, carrying a suitcase, with her hand on her forehead. The ajar doors in the hallway also reveal glimpses of a topless androgynous figure, as well as a shirtless man who appears to be receiving oral sex. As Madonna starts lip synching the song, she drops the suitcase and kneels down against the wall, while caressing her neck. She opens her coat, which reveals she is wearing lace underwear, garter belt, and stockings. An out-of-focus male figure, played by Ward, emerges, and slowly walks towards her. As Madonna stands, she pulls Ward towards her and they kiss.

More images from the doors are also shown, displaying a man in black leather clothes lacing a woman into a corset, as well as a woman wearing a corset who turns to camera thrusting her breasts forward. The video moves into a scene where Madonna is seen in a bedroom, slowly removing her clothes and displaying herself on a white bed as Ward observes her. He comes close to her, undressing himself and preparing to mount her, and she pushes him away. A cut occurs, and Madonna is seen laying down with an androgynous woman, wearing male clothes and make up applied on her eyes. They engage in a kiss as Ward observes as a voyeur. Two transgender women are then seen caressing each other's faces, while observing themselves in a mirror. The video returns to the bedroom scene, where Ward is on top of Madonna and appears to be penetrating her.

A dominatrix enters the bedroom in a cop hat and leather gloves, as well as suspenders covering her nipples. She then grabs Ward by the hair, who is tied up on a chair, wearing a latticed leather harness and leather chaps. Madonna and Ward are back in bed, caressing each other; he is then seen rubbing his face on Madonna's body until it reaches her feet. Women in drag draw thin mustaches on each other and look into the camera, as Madonna laughs in the background, putting her hand onto her mouth. A man holds a woman's face as she makes a fearful look to the camera. Two men are seen sitting on a couch caressing each other, while a crossdresser is laying down on their laps. Madonna leaves the hotel hurriedly, holding her suitcase, with Ward reaching out for her to return. She throws her head back as she laughs, with mouth open wide, then bites one of her fingers in disbelief. The video fades to black, and the words "poor is the man whose pleasures depend on the permission of another" appear on the screen.

=== Release and banning ===
The video was set to premiere on MTV's "Madonnathon" weekend event, of which it was going to be the main attraction. However, the network suddenly announced that it could not be broadcast; on November 29, 1990, MTV's correspondent Kurt Loder explained the reasons: "When MTV programming executives got their first look at the video's steamy bed scenes, gay and lesbian snuggling, S&M and briefly bared female breasts, they decided they couldn't air it." The channel's executives also said in a statement, "We love Madonna; we've had and will continue to have a terrific relationship with her. We respect her work as an artist and think she makes great videos. In its current form, this one is just not for us". It was rejected by its standards committee, which previews all new videos, and requests artists to edit or trim objectionable scenes. According to MTV's vice-president Abbey Konowitch, the network frequently had concerns about the content of the singer's videos, stating, "You take the black lingerie, sex scenes and flesh out of 'Justify My Love,' and you've got 10 seconds of ill-focused dancing." The channel had previously threatened to ban Madonna's music videos from airing — such as "Express Yourself", "Oh Father" (1989), and "Vogue" (1990) — but ultimately broadcast all videos unedited. When "Justify My Love" was submitted, Madonna thought she was "once again going to be able to bend the rules a little bit" after "Vogue" was broadcast; however, MTV simply refused to air it, refusing to even edit the video. The singer stated that "we didn't even really get a chance to try to make it viewable. They rejected it completely." The channel responded by saying, "This decision went all the way to the top. There is no way we could even edit this. I can't believe Madonna ever thought we would air it". This sparked suggestions by music industry insiders that the video was designed to be banned, as part of a marketing strategy.

"I guess half of me thought I was going to get away with it, that I was going to be able to convince them [MTV], and the other half thought, well, with the way of the censorship and conservatism that is sort of sweeping over the nation, I thought that there was going to be a problem."

— Madonna on MTV banning the video.

The video was premiered in its entirety on The Jukebox Network, an interactive cable network, on November 29, 1990; it was later aired on ABC's Nightline, on December 3. The channel's lawyers analyzed the video before it was shown, and agreed to its broadcast "because of the news value of the video, the late air time, and the focus of the discussion". Madonna was also interviewed by the show's host Forrest Sawyer about the video's sexual content and censorship. She defended the video as a "celebration of sex" and wondered, "Why is it that people are willing to go and watch a movie about someone getting blown to bits for no reason at all, and nobody wants to see two girls kissing and two men snuggling?" The singer also expressed during the interview that she did not understand why MTV banned the video yet allowed videos that contained violence and degradation to women to continue receiving regular airplay, saying, "I draw the line at violence and humiliation and degradation." Her appearance on Nightline became the show's highest-rated episode for the entire year. Other shows which showed parts of the video also garnered record-breaking ratings, such as Saturday Night Live (SNL) and CNN's Showbiz Today.

The music video was also banned from regular rotation on MuchMusic and Musique Plus in Canada. John Martin, program director for the former, said it was inappropriate to air, while the latter's program director Pierre Marchand called the video a "soft-porn short movie with a message about freedom of choice", and stated that viewers needed to understand before accepting it. The banning led MuchMusic to air a special titled A Question of Taste, where the video was aired in its entirety, accompanied by panel discussions on its artistic and cultural context. In the UK, the video premiered on Channel 4's The Word, and later the Independent Broadcasting Authority determined its airing only after the 9pm watershed. Although many complaints were received, the clip was played without restriction on the Australian Broadcasting Corporation's music video show Rage, as the channel is not bound to follow classification guidelines due to being a public broadcaster. In 2002, the video was aired in its entirety on MTV2 as part of a special countdown showing the most controversial videos ever to air on MTV.

Upon the video's banning, Madonna decided make it available commercially as a video single, marking the first time an artist had released a single in this format in the United States; it was described as an unprecedented move in the video industry. When asked whether she stood to make money selling the video than airing it on MTV, she answered, "Yeah, so lucky me." The video single was released on December 7, 1990, in the US, with the retail price of $9.98. The European version also contained Madonna's performance of "Vogue" at the 1990 MTV Video Music Awards. The release peaked at number two on Billboard's Top Music Videos for two weeks, and spent 39 weeks on the chart overall. It has been certified four times platinum by the Recording Industry Association of America (RIAA), for shipments of 200,000 units in the US, and went on to sell over a million copies worldwide, becoming the best selling video single of all time. In the United Kingdom, the video was given an 18 certificate by the British Board of Film Classification (BBFC), meaning no one under that age could legally buy or see the release. It was reported that in Saudi Arabia it was sold at a high price as illegal market porn. The music video was included on the greatest hits package Celebration: The Video Collection (2009); the version included was censored with black bars in a scene that contains female nudity.

=== Reception and analysis ===
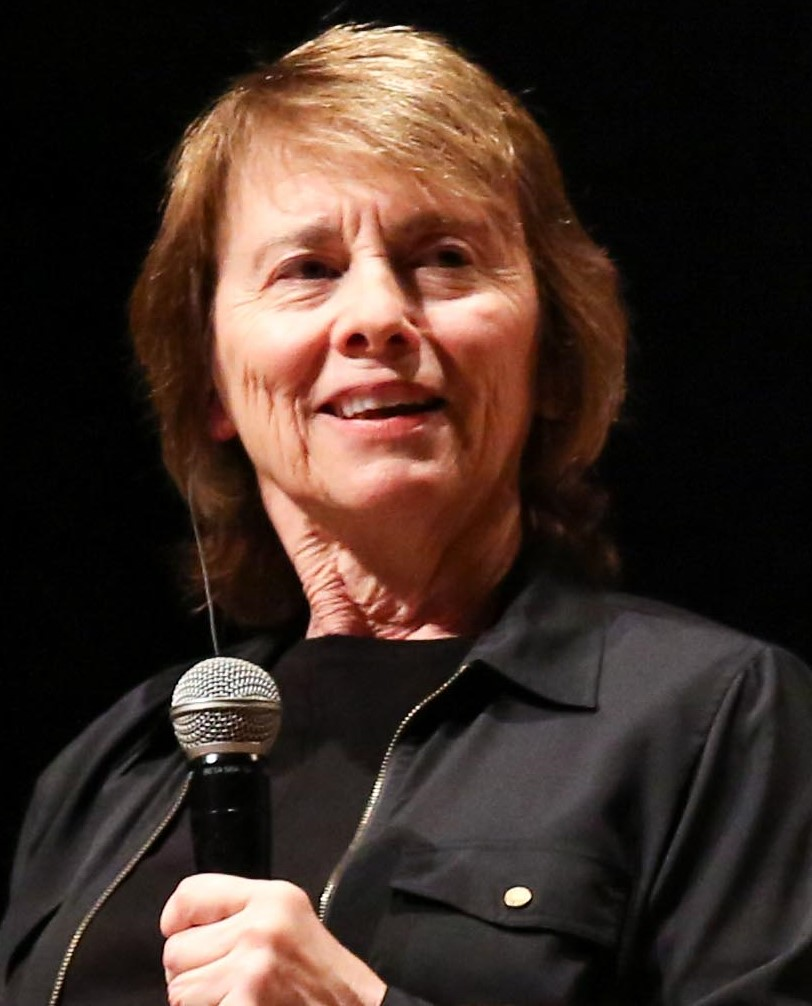
Upon the video's release, Camille Paglia agreed that banning the video from MTV was the right decision, despite deeming it as "truly avant-garde".

Caryn James from Tampa Bay Times considered Madonna's music videos for "Express Yourself" and "Papa Don't Preach" (1986) more controversial, but deemed "Justify My Love" as her most pretentious, stating: "The feminist message of Justify My Love is that Madonna can control a career as shrewdly as any man." Camille Paglia, writing for The New York Times, called Madonna "a true feminist" and deemed the video "truly avant-garde, at a time when that word has lost its meaning in the flabby art world". Nevertheless, she stated that MTV was right to ban it, as "parents cannot possibly control television, with its titanic omnipresence" and that "it does not belong on a mainstream music channel watched around the clock by children". On the other hand, Liz Smith, writing for the Sarasota Herald-Tribune, was critical of the decision, and hoped that since "MTV has gone so moral on the public, that they'll also begin to take close looks at other material submitted to them by all those macho metal and rap groups, with their own S&M overtones, their incipient violence and degradation-of-women themes". She also noted that who admired the singer would applaud her refusal to censor her art, and who never liked her would dislike her more than ever. Richard Goldstein from The Village Voice opined that "by suppressing erotic dissent, MTV does its best to see that this powerful medium will not communicate the 'wrong' idea about sex. That may pacify the puritans, but it also makes it easier to deny women and gays their full humanity—easier for the metal masses to justify their hate", concluding that "'Justify My Love' makes it harder to hurt people". Johns Hopkins University professor of popular culture Mark Crispin Miller observed that it was "perfectly all right for MTV to broadcast sadomasochism couplings and events as long as the images don't violate a certain heterosexual norm". Considine agreed, stating that there was "very little" in the clip that had not been seen on MTV, pointing out music videos by R.E.M., Boy George and Aerosmith as examples.

Benjamin Svetkey from Entertainment Weekly pointed out that "MTV has banned videos before, but this time the network was saying no to the world’s most powerful recording artist. Madonna's sex-charged career has been carved out of controversy, and now, for the first time, the hippest cultural outlet on television was telling her to cool it." Sharing a similar opinion, Lisa Henderson, writing in the book The Madonna Connection: Representational Politics, Subcultural Identities, And Cultural Theory, stated that for critics and fans, "it was an odd scenario—MTV rejecting its premier pop star, whose stylistic developments had arguably marked (and marketed) the evolution of music television itself". Considine wrote in the book The Madonna Companion: Two Decades of Commentary that the banning "immediately mushroomed into a censorship scandal", as "Madonna insisted that she hadn't caused the commotion intentionally", but "her critics accused her of planning the whole thing. Nobody doubted her intelligence then—they merely held it against her." In Justify My Love: Sex, Subversion, and Music Video, Ryann Donnelly wrote that "while the banning of Madonna's Justify My Love video for its explicit sexual content has become somewhat legendary — a sufficient promotional tool in itself — few artists could have sacrificed the support of MTV in a similar way to that of Madonna, before YouTube". Commenting on the video's release as a video single, Landon Palmer stated in Rock Star/Movie Star: Power and Performance in Cinematic Rock Stardom that "the release of 'Justify My Love' exclusively on VHS had the effect of creating a new moving image platform – the 'video single' – for Madonna's cultural production, extending the narrowcast relationship between artist and audience popularized by MTV".

The video's bisexual and sadomasochist themes were also noted. In another article, Paglia recalled that "in a number of videos, Madonna has played with bisexual innuendos", and "Justify My Love" was a culmination of that; she considered Madonna as a pioneer for "restoring lesbian eroticism to the continuum of heterosexual response" in the clip, showing "bisexuality and all experimentation as a liberation from false, narrow categories". Lucy O'Brien, in her book She Bop II: The Definitive History of Women in Rock, Pop and Soul, wrote that "conveying the full power of sexual ambiguity", Madonna showed in the video "how gender roles could be swapped, blurred and played with to create a multitude of different identities". According to Janelle L. Wilson and Gerald E. Markle, the eroticism shown in the video was "by traditional standards, non-normative. The effeminate dancer, the homosexual behavior and the action and appearance of the masculine woman in the video also represent behavior outside the accepted norms." For Cathy Schwichtenberg, Madonna's "languid French kiss with l'autre femme" in the video was a representation of "a deconstruction of lines and boundaries that fragment male/female gender polarities and pluralize sexual practices. This is a postmodern, unbounded feminism, that unifies coalitionally rather than foundationally." According to Tim Dean in the book Beyond Sexuality, the music video was "replete with stylized gestures of representing the whole catalogue of perverse activity: lesbianism, fetishism, voyeurism, transvestism, troilism, and the ritual accoutrements of sadomasochism".

Reflecting on the video for "Justify My Love" in a retrospective review, Tom Breiham from Stereogum pointed out that the video became "one more time that Madonna made the entire media industrial complex serve her interests". Daniel Browne, writing for The Gay UK website, cited five reasons for calling the video a "masterpiece", such as sex, gender bending, and gay and lesbian romping, describing it as "five minutes of artistic brilliance. I cannot think of a video before or since that covers such a topic in a positive and empowering way. The act of sex in its various forms, cross-dressing and fluid sexuality tend to kept behind closed doors." In a similar vein, Dig!'s Mark Elliott went on to say that "the gender fluidity and nudity featured in the new video were provocative enough in a more sheltered era, but the fact it was being issued by such a major star was extraordinary", citing George Michael's "I Want Your Sex" (1987) as an example of a video that had explored similar thematic territory, but was altogether more conventional in its approach. Samantha Grossman from Time observed that "if YouTube had existed when 'Justify My Love' was released in 1990, the extremely NSFW music video would have gone viral in minutes, if not seconds". In 2015, Christopher Rosa of VH1 showed the music video to five people around the age of twenty, later interviewing them on their thoughts after watching it. All five of them agreed that it was "certainly envelope-pushing", but also pointed out that "it's nothing 2015 artists haven't done (or even surpassed)", with the author citing the film Fifty Shades of Grey and Nicki Minaj's music video for "Anaconda" (2014) as examples. Additionally, it was later added to sexiest music videos of all time lists by VH1, Rolling Stone, and Marie Claire.

== Live performances ==
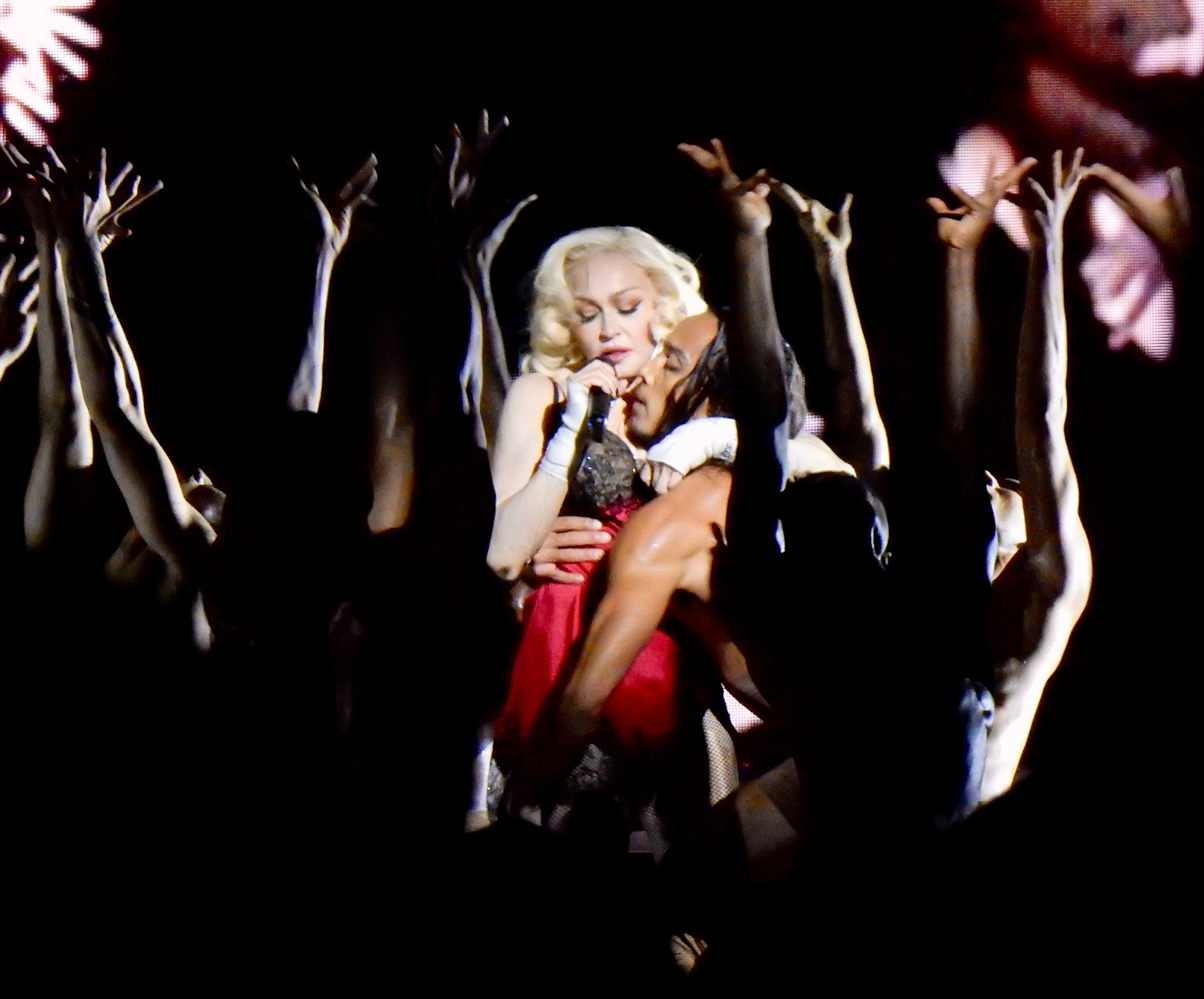
Madonna performing "Justify My Love" on the Celebration Tour (2023–2024)

Madonna performed "Justify My Love" for the first time on the Girlie Show tour in 1993 during the concert's encore. For the performance, the singer and her dancers wore period costumes, mocking specifically Victorian fashion, while she held a lorgnette. The New York Daily News' Jim Farber commented that Madonna and the dancers "cavorted elegantly" throughout the number, reversing expectations that the performance would be raunchy. Richard Corliss from Time magazine complimented the performance, opining that the singer saved "her best anachronistic joke for last", noting its "stately cadence" and comparing the costumes to those of My Fair Lady. "The Beast Within" remix was also used on the tour as an interlude with two male dancers performing an apocalyptic dance, miming couplings and brawls while Madonna, from off-stage, recited the lyrics. Jon Pareles from The New York Times considered the performance an "ambiguous sequence, mourning the sexual freedom of the pre-AIDS 1970's, then hinting at biblical retribution". These two performances on the November 19, 1993 show at Sydney Cricket Ground was recorded and released on VHS and LaserDisc on April 26, 1994, as The Girlie Show: Live Down Under.

"The Beast Within" remix was again used as the video introduction to 2004's Re-Invention World Tour; the visual showed footage of X-STaTIC Pro=CeSS, a collaboration between Madonna and Steven Klein. Chart Attack magazine staff noted its "quasi-religious mumbo-jumbo" paired with "some genuinely arty images of the singer" on the screens, while Sal Cinquemani from Slant Magazine found the introduction "macabre". It was subsequently included on the 2006 documentary and live album I'm Going to Tell You a Secret.

"Justify My Love" was later used as a video interlude during the MDNA Tour in 2012. The performance featured dancers wearing white pierrot masks, who "impressed with their fully synchronized dance moves", according to Danilo Saraiva from Quem magazine. The video, directed by Tom Munro, featured a lingerie-clad Madonna. The number was included in the live album MDNA World Tour, released on September 6, 2013. Elements of the song were also used during the "S.E.X." interlude on the Rebel Heart Tour in 2015–16, as dancers writhed on "gravity-defying" beds. The performance of the song at the March 19–20, 2016 shows in Sydney's Allphones Arena was recorded and released in Madonna's fifth live album, Rebel Heart Tour. The song's performance on the Celebration Tour (2023–2024) featured "Busby Berkeley-esque choreography", and saw the singer —dressed in lingerie and bondage gear— cavorting in a bed with a female dancer wearing a gimp mask and simulating masturbation, in a sequence that referred the Blond Ambition World Tour. "Justify My Love" was named one of the best moments of the concert by Billboard's Joe Lynch. "The Beast Within" was also used as a video interlude on Celebration. The BBC's Mark Savage criticized the inclusion: "Did we really need [...] the obscure "Beast Within" remix [...] when songs like 'Express Yourself' and 'Frozen' were discarded as snippets?".

== Usage in media, covers and samples ==
On May 11, 1991, Madonna made a guest appearance on SNL on the recurring sketch Wayne's World; it spoofed the song's music video as well as her documentary Madonna: Truth or Dare. The spoof consisted of Wayne (Mike Myers) and Garth (Dana Carvey) encountering a seductive Madonna lying on a bed in a hotel room during a fantasy dream sequence, filmed in black and white. After some back-and-forth banter, Wayne and Madonna play truth or dare. Wayne begins by saying "truth". Madonna then asks "Have you ever made love with two women at the same time?" He answers "Uh... yes!" to which Madonna says, "Okay, I believe you... Not!" Wayne then dares Madonna to make out with him. As they kiss, the music for "Justify My Love" begins playing. The scene ends as two dominatrixes appear in the room, accompanied by a Prince lookalike.

In 1999, a cover of the song, done by Front Line Assembly with vocals by Kristy Thirsk, was included on the compilation album Virgin Voices: A Tribute To Madonna, Vol. 1. The next year, it received cover versions included on the tribute albums Truly Blue: Tribute to Madonna and A Tribute to Madonna: Tranceformed. "Justify My Love" was also covered by rapper Vita, featuring singer Ashanti, for The Fast and the Furious soundtrack in 2001, while the same year another cover version by Starsound Orchestra was included on the tribute album Plays the Hits Made Famous by Madonna. In 2012, Brazilian singer Gretchen recorded a cover with a music video using footage of her own acting career. In 2020, Chavez released her own version of "Justify My Love" on streaming platforms. Two years later, she released a limited edition cassette with eight remixes.

German band Enigma sampled one of the remixes of the song for their "Orthodox Remix" of the 1991 single, "Mea Culpa (Part II)". In 1994, Eurodance act Maxx sampled its beat in the song "Suddenly", included on their debut studio album To the Maxximum. German electronic duo Jam & Spoon sampled a part of the song's remixes for a remix of "Kaleidoscope Skies" (1997), featuring Plavka. Rapper Mase used a sample from "Justify My Love" on his song "Stay Out of My Way", included on his second studio album, Double Up (1999). In 2003, rapper Jay-Z also sampled the song on "Justify My Thug", on his eighth studio album, The Black Album, described as a "hip hop re-working" of the original song. Portions of "Justify My Love" were used by Insane Clown Posse in their 2004 single "Bowling Balls".

== Credits and personnel ==
Credits adapted from The Immaculate Collection liner notes.

Management

- Recorded at Waterfront Studios and Unique Recording Studios, London, United Kingdom and New York City, New York
- Mastered at Sterling Sound Studios, New York City, New York
- Mixed at Guerilla Studios, London, United Kingdom
- Freddy DeMann Management, The DeMann Entertainment Co. Ltd.
- Miss Bessie Music, Webo Girl Publishing, Inc., Warner Bros. Music Corp, Bleu Disc Music Co. Inc (ASCAP)

Personnel

- Madonna – vocals, writer, background vocals
- Lenny Kravitz – writer, producer, background vocals
- André Betts – associate producer
- Henry Hirsch – recording
- David Domanich – recording
- Andy Cardenas – recording
- Josh Cuervokas – recording
- Shep Pettibone – audio mixing
- Goh Hotoda – audio mixing
- Patrick Demarchelier – photographer
- Jeri Heiden – art director

== Track listing and formats ==
- US and UK cassette and 7-inch single; Japanese mini CD single
1. "Justify My Love" (album version) – 4:58
2. "Express Yourself" (Shep's 'Spressin' Himself Re-Remix) – 4:02
- US Digipak CD maxi-single
1. "Justify My Love" (Q-Sound Mix) – 4:54
2. "Justify My Love" (Orbit 12-inch mix) – 7:16
3. "Justify My Love" (hip hop mix) – 6:30
4. "Express Yourself" (1990) (Shep's 'Spressin' Himself Re-Remix) – 9:30
5. "Justify My Love" (The Beast Within Mix) – 6:10
- Canadian and Australian 12-inch single
1. "Justify My Love" (Orbit 12-inch mix) – 7:16
2. "Justify My Love" (hip hop mix) – 6:30
3. "Justify My Love" (The Beast Within Mix) – 6:10
4. "Express Yourself" (1990) (Shep's 'Spressin' Himself Re-Remix) – 9:30
- European 12-inch and CD maxi-single
1. "Justify My Love" (hip hop mix) – 6:30
2. "Justify My Love" (Q-Sound Mix) – 4:54
3. "Justify My Love" (The Beast Within Mix) – 6:10
- UK and European CD single; UK limited-edition 12-inch picture disc
1. "Justify My Love" (William Orbit Remix) – 7:07
2. "Justify My Love" (album version) – 4:58
3. "Express Yourself" (Shep's 'Spressin' Himself Re-Remix) – 4:02
- Digital single (2020)
1. "Justify My Love" (Q-Sound Mix) – 4:54
2. "Justify My Love" (Orbit 12-inch mix) – 7:16
3. "Justify My Love" (hip hop mix) – 6:30
4. "Express Yourself" (1990) (Shep's 'Spressin' Himself Re-Remix) – 9:30
5. "Justify My Love" (The Beast Within Mix) – 6:10
6. "Justify My Love" (Orbit edit) – 4:33

== Charts ==
=== Weekly charts ===
Weekly chart performance for "Justify My Love"
Chart (1990–1991)	Peak position
Australia (ARIA)	4
Austria (Ö3 Austria Top 40)	9
Belgium (Ultratop 50 Flanders)	9
Canada Retail Singles (The Record)	2
Canada Contemporary Hit Radio (The Record)	1
Canada Top Singles (RPM)	1
Canada Dance/Urban (RPM)	3
Chile (IFPI)	1
Europe (Eurochart Hot 100)	3
Finland (Suomen virallinen lista)	1
France (SNEP)	17
Germany (GfK)	10
Greece (IFPI)	4
Iceland (Íslenski Listinn Topp)	6
Ireland (IRMA)	3
Italy (Musica e dischi)	2
Luxembourg (Radio Luxembourg)	1
Netherlands (Dutch Top 40)	4
Netherlands (Single Top 100)	5
New Zealand (Recorded Music NZ)	5
Norway (VG-lista)	3
Portugal (AFP)	4
Spain (AFYVE)	3
Sweden (Sverigetopplistan)	8
Switzerland (Schweizer Hitparade)	3
UK Singles (Official Charts)	2
UK Airplay (Music Week)	9
US Billboard Hot 100	1
US Dance Club Songs (Billboard)	1
US Dance Singles Sales (Billboard)	1
US Hot R&B/Hip-Hop Songs (Billboard)	42
US Cash Box Top 100	1
US CHR & Pop Charts (Radio & Records)	1

=== Year-end charts ===
Year-end performance for "Justify My Love"
Chart (1991)	Position
Belgium (Ultratop 50 Flanders)	92
Brazil (Brazilian Radio Airplay)	42
Canada Top Singles (RPM)	44
Canada Dance/Urban (RPM)	29
Europe (Eurochart Hot 100)	23
Europe (European Hit Radio)	37
France (SNEP)	86
Germany (Media Control)	66
Norway Winter Period (VG-lista)	17
Sweden (Topplistan)	59
UK Singles (OCC)	43
US Billboard Hot 100	21
12-inch Singles Sales (Billboard)	30
US Dance Club Play (Billboard)	9
US Top Video Sales (Billboard)	20

== Certifications and sales ==
Certifications and sales for "Justify My Love"
Region	Certification	Certified units/sales
Physical
Australia (ARIA)	Gold	35,000^{^}
Canada (Music Canada)	Gold	50,000^{^}
United Kingdom (BPI)	Silver	275,500
United States (RIAA)	Platinum	1,000,000^{^}
Video single
Australia (ARIA)	Gold	7,500^{^}
Canada	—	20,000
Japan (Oricon)	—	14,125
Italy	—	7,000
United States (RIAA)	4× Platinum	500,000
^{^} Shipments figures based on certification alone.

== See also ==
- Pazz & Jop
- List of Cash Box Top 100 number-one singles of 1990
- List of Cash Box Top 100 number-one singles of 1991

== Book sources ==
- Bego, Mark (2000). Madonna: Blonde Ambition. Cooper Square Press. ISBN 978-0-8154-1051-5.
- Bronson, Fred (2002). The Billboard Book of Number 1 Hits. Billboard Books. ISBN 978-0-8230-7677-2.
- Burt, Richard (1994). The Administration of Aesthetics. University of Minnesota Press. ISBN 0-8166-2367-8.
- Clerk, Carol (2002). Madonnastyle. Omnibus Press. ISBN 978-0-7119-8874-3.
- Donnelly, Ryann (2019). Justify My Love: Sex, Subversion, and Music Video. Watkins Publishing. ISBN 978-1-912248-41-4.
- Fouz-Hernández, Santiago; Jarman-Ivens, Freya (2004). Madonna's Drowned Worlds: New Approaches to Her Cultural Transformations, 1983–2003. Ashgate Publishing. ISBN 978-0-754-63372-3.
- Guilbert, Georges-Claude (2002). Madonna as Postmodern Myth. McFarland. ISBN 978-0-7864-1408-6.
- McAleer, Dave (1990). The Omnibus Book of British and American Hit Singles, 1960–1990. Omnibus Press. ISBN 978-0-7119-2180-1.
- Metz, Allen; Benson, Carol (1999). The Madonna Companion: Two Decades of Commentary. Music Sales Group. ISBN 978-0-8256-7194-4.
- O'Brien, Lucy (2018). Madonna: Like an Icon. HarperCollins. ISBN 978-0-552-17602-6.
- Rettenmund, Matthew (1995). Encyclopedia Madonnica. St. Martin's Press. ISBN 978-0-312-11782-5.
- Rooksby, Rikky (2004). Madonna: The Complete Guide to Her Music. Omnibus Press. ISBN 978-0-711-99883-4.
- Schwichtenberg, Cathy (1993). The Madonna Connection. Westview Press. ISBN 0813313961.
- Taraborrelli, J. Randy (2018). Madonna: An Intimate Biography. Simon & Schuster. ISBN 978-0-330-45446-9.
- Whiteley, Sheila (2000). Women and Popular Music: Sexuality, Identity, and Subjectivity. Routledge. ISBN 978-0415211895.
