= Tripomatic Fairytales 2001 =

Studio album by Jam & Spoon
- Released: 1993
- Genre: EDM; Eurodance; trance; ambient
- Label: Dance Pool
- Producer: Jam El Mar; Mark Spoon

Jam & Spoon chronology
Breaks Unit 1 (1991)	Tripomatic Fairytales 2001 (1993)	Kaleidoscope (1997)

Professional ratings
Review scores
Source	Rating
AllMusic	4/5 stars
Melody Maker	(favorable)
Music Week	4/5 stars
NME	5/10
Select	3/5 stars

Tripomatic Fairytales 2001 is an album by German electronic music duo Jam & Spoon, released in 1993. It features their three International hit singles, "Right in the Night (Fall in Love with Music)", "Find Me (Odyssey to Anyoona)" and "Angel (Ladadi O-Heyo)". The album was re-structured twice to permit the inclusion of "Find Me (Odyssey to Anyoona)" and "Angel (Ladadi O-Heyo)", released after the first pressing of the album.

== Critical reception ==
Melody Maker gave a positive review of the album, writing, "Tripomatic Fairytales is the finest example of music you're likely to hear this year." Brad Beatnik from Music Week's RM Dance Update praised it as an "outstanding" and "beautifully packaged" album, that "captures the subtley defined and cleverly commercial side to their talents. Totally listener-friendly techno with enough melodies to rival a Beatles songbook."

== Track listing ==
1. "Heart of Africa" – 6:49
2. "Odyssey to Anyoona" – 9:59
3. "Two Spys in the House of Love" – 0:32
4. "Stella" – 6:19
5. "Neurotrance Adventure" – 5:42
6. "Operating Spaceship Earth" – 1:28
7. "Zen Flash Zen Bones" – 6:10
8. "Who Opened the Door to Nowhere" – 2:44
9. "Right in the Night (Fall in Love with Music)" (Single Version) – 6:05
10. "Muffeled Drums" – 0:40
11. "Path of Harmony" – 7:02
12. "Paradise Garage" – 6:30
13. "Earth Spirit" – 6:28
14. "Stellas Cry" – 7:25
