= Time to Burn (Storm song) =

2000 single by Storm

- One of the German artwork variants

Single by Storm

from the album Stormjunkie
- Released: May 2000
- Genre: Hard house; dark trance
- Length: 6:40 (album version); 3:55 (video edit); 2:55 (UK radio edit)
- Label: Zeitgeist
- Songwriters: Trancy Spacer; Spacy Trancer
- Producers: Trancy Spacer; Spacy Trancer

Storm singles chronology
"Love Is Here to Stay" (1999)	"Time to Burn" (2000)	"Stormanimal" (2000)

Audio
- "Time to Burn" on YouTube

"Time to Burn" is a song by German electronic music duo Storm, also known as Jam & Spoon. It was released as the fourth single from Storm's only studio album, Stormjunkie, in May 2000. A hard house and dark trance song, the track was written and produced by Storm members Rolf Ellmer and Markus Löffel under the pseudonyms Trancy Spacer and Spacy Trancer. The main stab sound and melody is sampled from X-101's 1991 song "Sonic Destroyer". "Time to Burn" became the duo's highest-charting single on the UK Singles Chart when it peaked at number three in August 2000, and it also became a top-40 hit in Belgium, Ireland, and the Netherlands. The song is certified silver in the United Kingdom for shipping over 200,000 copies.

== Release and reception ==
In Germany, "Time to Burn" was released in May 2000 through Zeitgeist Records. On 29 May, it debuted at its peak of number 58 on the German Singles Chart, spending three more weeks in the top 100 before dropping out. Before its official UK release, the song appeared on the UK Singles Chart as an import single, reaching number 77. On 31 July 2000, Data Records released "Time to Burn" in the UK across three formats: CD, 12-inch vinyl, and cassette. Six days later, the song rose 74 places to number three on the UK Singles Chart, making it Jam & Spoon's highest-charting UK single under any of their aliases. "Time to Burn" spent 13 non-consecutive weeks within the UK top 100 and ended the year as the country's 65th-best-selling single, receiving a silver sales certification from the British Phonographic Industry (BPI) for shipping over 200,000 units in August 2000.

In Ireland, "Time to Burn" debuted at number 17 on the Irish Singles Chart on 10 August 2000. Three weeks later, it ascended to its peak of number 11. It spent 11 weeks within the Irish top 50 and ranked in at number 68 on the Irish year-end chart for 2000. Elsewhere in Europe, the song charted in the Netherlands and the Flanders region of Belgium. In the latter territory, the single charted for nine weeks, peaking at number 26 in November 2000. In the Netherlands, it reached number 20 on the Dutch Top 40 and number 18 on the Single Top 100. On the Eurochart Hot 100, "Time to Burn" debuted at number 15, its peak, and remained on the chart for nine weeks.

== Track listings ==
German maxi-CD single

1. "Time to Burn" (video edit) – 3:55
2. "Time to Burn" (12-inch long version) – 6:40
3. "Time to Burn" (Mauro Picotto mix) – 7:27
4. "Time to Burn" (Happy People in the Morning mix) – 6:54
5. "Time to Burn" (F.E.O.S. Treatment) – 6:21

German 12-inch single 1

A. "Time to Burn" (12-inch long version) – 6:40
B. "Time to Burn" (Happy People in the Morning mix) – 6:54

German 12-inch single 2

A. "Time to Burn" (Mauro Picotto mix) – 7:27
B. "Time to Burn" (F.E.O.S. Treatment) – 6:21

Benelux CD single

1. "Time to Burn" (video edit) – 3:55
2. "Time to Burn" (12-inch long version) – 6:40

UK CD single

1. "Time to Burn" (radio edit) – 2:55
2. "Time to Burn" (original 12-inch mix) – 6:43
3. "Time to Burn" (Ariel remix) – 6:25

UK 12-inch single

A1. "Time to Burn" (original mix)
B1. "Time to Burn" (Nick Sentience remix)
B2. "Time to Burn" (Mauro Picotto remix)

UK cassette single

1. "Time to Burn" (radio edit) – 2:55
2. "Time to Burn" (original 12-inch mix) – 6:43

Australian CD single

1. "Time to Burn" (radio edit)
2. "Time to Burn" (original 12-inch mix)
3. "Time to Burn" (Mauro Picotto remix)
4. "Time to Burn" (Pascal F.E.O.S. Treatment)

== Charts ==
=== Weekly charts ===
Chart (2000)	Peak position
Belgium (Ultratop 50 Flanders)	26
Europe (Eurochart Hot 100)	15
European Dance Traxx (Music & Media)	7
Germany (GfK)	58
Ireland (IRMA)	11
Netherlands (Dutch Top 40)	20
Netherlands (Single Top 100)	18
Scottish Singles Sales (Official Charts)	2
UK Singles (Official Charts)	3
UK Dance (Official Charts)	1

=== Year-end charts ===
Chart (2000)	Position
Ireland (IRMA)	68
UK Singles (OCC)	65

== Certifications ==
Region	Certification	Certified units/sales
United Kingdom (BPI)	Silver	200,000^{^}
^{^} Shipments figures based on certification alone.

== Release history ==
Region	Date	Format(s)	Label(s)	Ref.
Germany	May 2000	12-inch vinyl; CD	Zeitgeist	
United Kingdom	31 July 2000	12-inch vinyl; CD; cassette	Data	
