= Find Me (Odyssey to Anyoona) =

1994 single by Jam & Spoon

Single by Jam & Spoon featuring Plavka

from the album Tripomatic Fairytales 2001
- Released: 10 July 1994
- Genre: Eurodance; trance
- Length: 4:02
- Label: JAM!; Dance Pool
- Songwriters: Jam El Mar; Mark Spoon; Nosie Katzmann
- Producers: Jam El Mar; Mark Spoon

Jam & Spoon singles chronology
| "Right in the Night" (1993) | "Find Me (Odyssey to Anyoona)" (1994) | "Angel (Ladadi O-Heyo)" (1995) |

Music video
- "Find Me (Odyssey to Anyoona)" on YouTube

"Find Me (Odyssey to Anyoona)" is a song by German electronic music duo Jam & Spoon featuring American singer Plavka, released in July 1994 as the third single from their second album, Tripomatic Fairytales 2001 (1993). Written by Jam El Mar and Mark Spoon with Nosie Katzmann, the song was the follow-up to their successful hit single "Right in the Night" in 1993. It reached number one in Finland and number six in Italy, while in the United Kingdom and Australia, it peaked at number 22 in both countries. "Find Me (Odyssey to Anyoona)" also entered the Eurochart Hot 100 on 30 July 1994, peaking at number 19 on 27 August. The accompanying music video was directed by Angel Gracia, and received active rotation on MTV Europe and was A-listed on German music television channel VIVA in August 1994.

== Critical reception ==
AllMusic editor Keith Farley named "Find Me (Odyssey to Anyoona)" a highlight from Tripomatic Fairytales 2001. In his weekly UK chart commentary, James Masterton described it as "a slightly ambient piece of Euro-dance". Pan-European magazine Music & Media wrote that here, the team that brought you the smash "Right in the Night", "reads you another Madonna-esque myth from their Tripomatic Fairytales album." Music & Media editor Maria Jimenez noted that trance music "plays a major role" in "Find Me". Andy Beevers from Music Week gave it a score of four out of five, complimenting it as "a well-produced commercial trance epic with Spanish guitar effects. The addition of a catchy vocal from Plavka of the Rising High Collective has broadened the track's appeal and has helped to generate a real buzz."

Tommy Udo from NME wrote, "More Euro disco for messrs Jam El Mar and Mark Spoon [...]. It captures some of that Balearic spirit with an almost straight — well, you know what I mean — hi-NRG remix by Groovecult. On the downside, ex-Shamen vocalist Plavka isn't really suited to this track, which should have been more shouty, more, erm, Hazell Dean." Tim Jeffery from the Record Mirror Dance Update named it Tune of the Week, stating, "Jam and Spoon have managed to achieve crossover success without losing any of their credibility on the techno scene, which is some feat. This new doublepack is evidence of how they've done it." Another Record Mirror editor, James Hamilton, described it as a "Plavka Lonich warbled pulsating tinkly 0-136-0bpm electro trance throbber" in his weekly dance column. On the 1995 re-release, Hamilton described it as a "moodily started pulsating tinkly 0-136-0bpm trancer". Andrew Perry from Select named it as a "fantastic track" with "tribal euphoria" in his review of the album.

== Chart performance ==
"Find Me (Odyssey to Anyoona)" was a moderate success on the charts across Europe and in Australia, New Zealand and Canada. In Europe, the single peaked at number one in Finland and was a top-10 hit also in Italy, where it peaked at number six on the Musica e dischi singles chart. In the duo's native Germany, it became a top-20 hit, peaking at number 17 and spending a total of 16 weeks within the German Singles Chart between July and October 1994. It was a top-20 hit also in Belgium (16), the Netherlands (18) and Switzerland (20), and a top-30 hit in Ireland (24).

In the UK, "Find Me" peaked at number 22 in its first week on the UK Singles Chart on 10 September 1995, with a total of three weeks within the UK Top 100. And it also reached number seven on the UK Dance Singles Chart and number 32 on the Record Mirror Club Chart. On the Eurochart Hot 100, it peaked at number 19 in its fifth week on the chart, on 27 August 1994, after charting in Belgium, Finland, France, Germany, Italy, Netherlands and Switzerland. Outside Europe, the single was successful on the Canadian RPM Dance/Urban chart, peaking at number two. It was kept from the number-one position by Whigfield's "Saturday Night". In the US, it reached number 16 on the Billboard Dance Club Play chart. In Australia and New Zealand, "Find Me" peaked at numbers 22 and 34, respectively. In West Asia, the song became a top-10 hit in Israel, peaking at number nine in August 1994.

== Airplay ==
"Find Me (Odyssey to Anyoona)" topped the European Dance Radio Chart on 27 August 1994, becoming the most-played dance song on European radio in that period. On its year-end chart, it ended up as the 18th most-played dance song on European radio in 1994. It reached number 19 on the European Hit Radio chart, after appearing on playlists from 12 countries, most prominently on those from Italy (60%), followed by the Netherlands (50%) and Germany (48%). "Find Me (Odyssey to Anyoona)" also entered the European airplay chart Border Breakers at number 22 on 23 July 1994, due to crossover airplay in West-, North- and South-Europe. The single peaked at number three on 3 September same year.

== Track listings ==
- CD maxi-single (Europe, 1994)
1. "Find Me (Odyssey to Anyoona)" (radio mix) – 4:02
2. "Find Me (Odyssey to Anyoona)" – 7:30
3. "Die Kraft der vier Herzen" – 8:04
4. "The Tribe" – 6:46
5. "Find Me (Odyssey to Anyoona)" – 10:00
- CD maxi-single remix (Europe, 1994)
1. "Find Me (Odyssey to Anyoona)" (Dedicated to the Blondes) – 6:10
2. "Find Me (Odyssey to Anyoona)" (House Ideaz) – 5:41
3. "Find Me (Odyssey to Anyoona)" (Frühschicht) – 8:11
4. "Find Me (Odyssey to Anyoona)" (Ben Liebrand remix) – 8:25

== Charts ==
=== Weekly charts ===
| Chart (1994–1995) | Peak position |
|---|---|
| Australia (ARIA) | 22 |
| Belgium (Ultratop 50 Flanders) | 16 |
| Canada Dance/Urban (RPM) | 2 |
| Europe (Eurochart Hot 100) | 19 |
| Europe (European Dance Radio) | 1 |
| Europe (European Hit Radio) | 19 |
| Finland (Suomen virallinen lista) | 1 |
| Germany (GfK) | 17 |
| Ireland (IRMA) | 24 |
| Israel (Israeli Singles Chart) | 9 |
| Italy (Musica e dischi) | 6 |
| Netherlands (Dutch Top 40) | 18 |
| Netherlands (Single Top 100) | 20 |
| New Zealand (Recorded Music NZ) | 34 |
| Scottish Singles Sales (Official Charts) | 20 |
| Switzerland (Schweizer Hitparade) | 20 |
| UK Singles (Official Charts) | 22 |
| UK Dance (Official Charts) | 7 |
| UK Club Chart (Music Week) | 32 |
| US Dance Club Play (Billboard) | 16 |

=== Year-end charts ===
| Chart (1994) | Position |
|---|---|
| Canada Dance/Urban (RPM) | 36 |
| Europe (European Dance Radio) | 18 |
| Germany (Media Control) | 88 |
| Netherlands (Dutch Top 40) | 151 |

== Release history ==
| Region | Date | Format(s) | Label(s) | Ref. |
|---|---|---|---|---|
| Germany | 10 July 1994 | CD | JAM!; Dance Pool | |
| Australia | 18 July 1994 | CD; cassette | Dance Pool | |
| United Kingdom | 12 September 1994 | 12-inch vinyl; CD; cassette | Epic | |
