= Kaleidoscope Skies =

Single by Jam & Spoon featuring Plavka

from the album Kaleidoscope
- B-side: "I Pull My Gun"
- Released: May 12, 1997
- Length: 3:29
- Label: Epic; JAM!; Dance Pool
- Songwriters: Jam El Mar; Mark Spoon
- Producers: Jam El Mar; Mark Spoon

Jam & Spoon singles chronology
"Angel (Ladadi O-Heyo)" (1995)	"Kaleidoscope Skies" (1997)	"Chase" (2000)

Music video
- "Kaleidoscope Skies" on YouTube

"Kaleidoscope Skies" is a song by German electronic music duo Jam & Spoon featuring American singer Plavka, released in May 1997 by labels Epic, JAM! and Dance Pool as the first single from their second album, Kaleidoscope (1997). It was both written and produced by Jam El Mar and Mark Spoon and charted in several European territories. The single reached number two in Hungary and was a top-20 hit in Austria, Denmark, Germany and Italy. In the United Kingdom, it peaked at number 48 on the UK Singles Chart. The accompanying music video was directed by Angel Gracia. The picture on the cover of the single is a reproduction of a painting by Abdul Mati and was used in 1970 for the album Hooteroll?, performed by Howard Wales and Jerry Garcia.

== Critical reception ==
British magazine Music Week gave "Kaleidoscope Skies" a score of three out of five, writing, "Less frenetic than their usual style, this sweet, laid-back number fuses Spanish guitar with eastern influences."

== Track listing ==
- 12" single, UK (1997)
1. "Kaleidoscope Skies" (Club Mix) – 6:09
2. "Kaleidoscope Skies" (Open the Door/The Course Remix) – 4:40
3. "I Pull My Gun" (DJ Quicksilver Remix) – 7:22
- CD single, Europe (1997)
1. "Kaleidoscope Skies" (Radio Edit) – 3:29
2. "Kaleidoscope Skies" (Club Mix) – 6:10
- CD maxi, Germany (1997)
1. "Kaleidoscope Skies" (Radio Edit) – 3:29
2. "Kaleidoscope Skies" (Club Mix) – 6:09
3. "I Pull My Gun Once" – 5:04
4. "Pull My Gun Twice" – 5:20
- CD maxi (remixes), Germany (1997)
1. "Kaleidoscope Skies" (Jam & Spoon Remix) – 4:37
2. "Kaleidoscope Skies" (Open the Door/The Course Remix) – 4:40
3. "I Pull My Gun..." (DJ Quicksilver Remix) – 7:21

== Charts ==
=== Weekly charts ===
Chart (1997)	Peak position
Austria (Ö3 Austria Top 40)	18
Denmark (IFPI)	12
Estonia (Eesti Top 20)	3
Europe (Eurochart Hot 100)	55
Germany (GfK)	16
Hungary (Mahasz)	2
Iceland (Íslenski Listinn Topp 40)	28
Italy (Musica e dischi)	14
Italy Airplay (Music & Media)	6
Lithuania (M-1)	6
Poland Airplay (Music & Media)	7
Scotland (OCC)	33
UK Singles (OCC)	48

=== Year-end charts ===
Chart (1998)	Position
Germany (Media Control)	86
Romania (Romanian Top 100)	67
