= I Kiss Your Lips =

Single by Tokyo Ghetto Pussy

from the album Disco 2001
- Released: 1995
- Genre: Happy hardcore, rave
- Length: 3:52
- Songwriters: Trancy Spacer; Spacy Trancer
- Producers: Trancy Spacer; Spacy Trancer

Tokyo Ghetto Pussy singles chronology
"Everybody on the Floor (Pump It)" (1994)	"I Kiss Your Lips" (1995)	"To Another Galaxy" (1996)

"I Kiss Your Lips" is a song by the German electronic dance music duo Tokyo Ghetto Pussy, an alias of Jam & Spoon. It was released in 1995 as the second single from their album, Disco 2001. The song charted in several countries, and was a success in Australia and the Netherlands, where it reached the top 10.

== Track listing ==
1. "I Kiss Your Lips" (Radio & Video Edit) - 3:52
2. "I Kiss Your Lips" (Music for the Girlies Radio Edit) - 3:54
3. "I Kiss Your Lips" (Club Mix) - 5:30
4. "I Kiss Your Lips" (Music for the Girlies Extended) - 5:29
5. "I Kiss Your Lips" (Groovecult's Mastertits Remix) - 7:03

== Charts ==
=== Weekly charts ===
Chart (1995)	Peak position
Australia (ARIA)	8
Germany (GfK)	94
Netherlands (Dutch Top 40)	3
Netherlands (Single Top 100)	5
New Zealand (Recorded Music NZ)	39
UK Singles (Official Charts)	55

=== Year-end charts ===
Chart (1995)	Position
Australia (ARIA)	58
Netherlands (Dutch Top 40)	50
Netherlands (Single Top 100)	61

== Certifications ==
Region	Certification	Certified units/sales
Australia (ARIA)	Gold	35,000^{^}
^{^} Shipments figures based on certification alone.

== Yellow Claw version ==
On 2 September 2020, Dutch DJ trio Yellow Claw teamed up with Tokyo Ghetto Pussy to release a remastered version of the song.
