= Ariel (DJ) =

Electronic musician and record producer

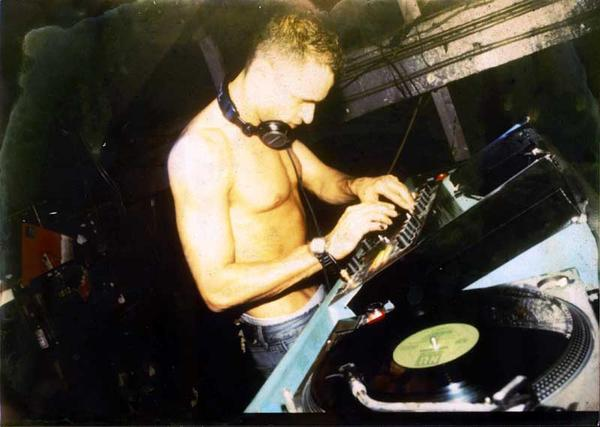
- Ariel performing in London's Bagley's Studios nightclub at King's Cross, 1998.

Background information
- Born: Ariel Belloso; 14 September 1967 (age 59); Rosario, Santa Fe, Argentina
- Genres: House; trance; hard house; Latin tech house
- Occupations: Disc jockey; record producer
- Years active: 1982–present
- Labels: A&M Records, London Records, MyDust

Ariel Belloso (born September 14, 1967) is an Argentine, UK-based DJ and record producer. He began his career playing new wave and disco music at clubs in the city of Rosario during the early 1980s, later moving to Buenos Aires. In 1991, after spending eight months in Ibiza, he relocated to London, where he was influenced by the early house and acid house sounds.

During the 1990s, he combined the sounds of hard house and trance. He was the first Argentine artist to enter the UK Singles Chart's top 40 with his single, "A9".

In 2001, his musical style shifted to a Latin-influenced house and techno sound, which he produced and performed through his 7-year weekly residency at London's Fabric nightclub.

== History ==
=== Early years (1983–1996) ===
During his childhood, Ariel's family owned a nightclub named Katanga in Rosario, Argentina. Inspired by his older brother, he took up his first residency at Dimension Nightclub in Rosario. More residencies followed, including Mengano, Metro, Lager and Damasco. On New Year's Eve, 1985, Ariel ended his residency at the Dimension nightclub with the performance of a set lasting 17 hours.

After completing secondary education, Ariel attended Rosario University of Economics, studying for 2 years before deciding to leave. Ariel was arriving in Ibiza, in the spring of 1991, when he met DJ Alfredo; a fellow DJ from Rosario, who held a residency at the nightclub Pacha.

Soon after Ariel played his first European set at Pacha followed by guest performances in Lola, Es Paradis, including one gig at the recently launched terrace at Space. While performing in Ibiza, Ariel was photographed by art designer 'Trademark'.

=== 1996–2010 ===
In 1996, Ariel opened a weekly residency in London. He was offered a ten-hour-long set in the second room of Bagley's Studios in Kings Cross (now renamed Canvas) for the weekly Saturday night event, Freedom. Three months later, he moved to the main room, where he performed for 8 hours. On 21 August 1998, The Evening Standard newspaper in London ran a 2-page article citing Ariel's "Techno set at Bagley’s" as the main cause of Class A drug consumption in the King's Cross area of London.

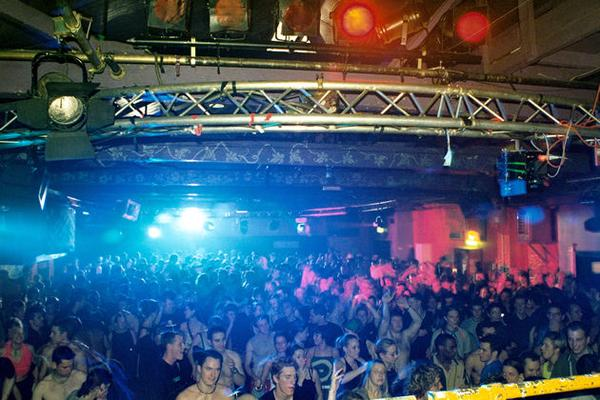
The main room in Bagley's studios

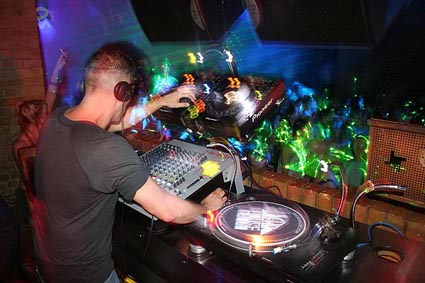
Ariel performing in Fabric on 9 July 2006

Ariel has been a resident DJ at London's Fabric since its opening in 1999. Ariel left Fabric on 8 October, 2006 after a 7-year-long residency (approximately 400 gigs). His party "Latinaires" took place once a month, along with the weekly event "The Gallery" for 2 years (2002–2004). In 2004, Ariel launched "Manteca", a weekly Latin music club, at Freedom bar in London's Soho.

In May 2000, "A9" was featured as Mixmag’s Big Tune of the Month. In 2005, Ariel began a partnership with young producers Alex Celler and X Green to co-produce further music projects, and in March 2007, he officially launched his digital record label MyDust. Ariel toured Australia in 2008, playing venues in Sydney, Melbourne, and Perth. In 2009, Ariel released his album, "Camará".

=== 2010–present ===
In 2016, the Ministry of Sound website published an article titled "Stars of VHS". Video footage of DJ Ariel's performance at Bunker nightclub in Buenos Aires, Argentina, on 9 October 1994 has been included in the 2023 documentary Comandante Fort.

== Music ==
Ariel's early musical influences include early new wave music and the disco sounds of Talking Heads, Blondie, Kat Mandu, The Clash, The B-52's, Flash and the Pan, and Gino Soccio, as well as Latin American rumba.

Ariel's debut single, "Deep", released in 1997, was a hardhouse and trance record, released on Wonderboy Records and entered the number 1 spot on the UK Official Dance Chart. Ariel had multiple commissions for remixes.

Some of these remixes include Marmion's "Schöneberg", Vincent De Moor's "Flowtation", Dj Sandy Vs Housetrap's "Overdrive", Storm's "Time to Burn", Lil Louis Vs Josh Wink's "French Kiss" and Darude's "Sandstorm". Meanwhile, Ariel also released a series of more underground records, including The End EP and "Icebreaker/Time". In 2000, Ariel released "A9", which went on to become a UK Top 30.

In March 2007, Ariel started releasing his tracks on MyDust. Some of those tracks were made but never released.

== Club residences ==
=== Residencies ===
Year	Club	Location	Schedule
1982–1986	Dimension	Rosario, Argentina	Weekly
1986–1987	El Almacén de Fulano / La Ventana / Mengano	Rosario, Argentina	Weekly
1988	Lager	Rosario, Argentina	Weekly
1989–1990	Palá	Rosario, Argentina	Weekly
1990	Metro	Rosario, Argentina	Weekly
1991	Lunes Locos Pacha / Thursdays Es Paradis / Catwalk Bar / Lola / Angels	Ibiza, Spain	Monthly
1992–1994	Village Youth Limelight / The Playground, Iceni / Browns	London, UK	Weekly
1992–1993	Basement, Sundays Kudos / Attitude Legends	London, UK	Weekly
1993	Fuct Crews	London, UK	Weekly
1994–1995	Lovezoo	Neuchatel, Switzerland	Monthly
1994–1995	Ritual Xenon	Madrid, Spain	Monthly
1995	Zap	Brighton, UK	Monthly
1995	Ritual Velvet Underground	London, UK	Weekly
1995–1996	Prism Underneath Bagleys	London, UK	Weekly
1996–2001	8 Hour Sets Dancehall, Freedom Bagleys	London, UK	Weekly
1999–2006	DTPM, Room 2 Fabric	London, UK	Weekly
2002–2004	Latinaires Turnmills	London, UK	Monthly
2004–2005	Manteca Freedom Bar	London, UK	Weekly
2005–2007	Home Of La Troya Renaissance Rooms / Ministry Of Sound	London, UK	Quarterly
2006–2007	Discotec (Lounge Mondiale) The End	London, UK	Bi-monthly
2006–2008	Matinee Area / Fabric	London, UK	Monthly
2007	Gorgeous Space	Ibiza, Spain	Weekly
2007–2008	Smartie Partie Turnmills	London, UK	Quarterly
2007–2009	Heaven	London, UK	Weekly
2009–2011	Onyx, Area	London, UK	Weekly
2010–2015	Room Service	London, UK	Monthly

== Personal life ==
Ariel has been on hiatus since 2008. During this time he has written and self-published several books on nutrition and naturopathy.

== Selected discography ==
Some selected discography:

=== Albums ===
- 1999: The Sound of Freedom (Automatic Records)
- 2000: Freedom – 4 Ultimate Years of Clubbing (Wax Records)
- 2003: Nu Latin Live (Red and Blue)
- 2005: DTPM – Sydney vs London (DTPM Recordings)
- 2006: Mandarin (MyDust)
- 2009: Camará (MyDust)

=== Singles/EPs ===
- 1996: "Deep" (Pilot Recordings)
- 1997: "Deep (I'm Falling Deeper)" (A&M) – UK #47
- 1997: The End EP (Pilot)
- 1997: "Get On Down" (White Label)
- 1999: "PsychoKiller" (White Label)
- 1999: "Icebreaker/Time" (Pneumatiq)
- 2000: "A9" (Automatic Records) – UK #28
- 2000: "A9" (London)
- 2000: Ariel Presents: Tools Volume One (A7 Records)
- 2000: Sampler One – Out Here (A7)
- 2003: "Central" (Phoenix G)
- 2005: "Hambre" (Demo)
- 2007: "Se Miro" (MyDust)
- 2008: "Vandula" (MyDust)
- 2008: "Santiago" (MyDust)
- 2010: "Chevere" (MyDust)
- 2011: "D'ese" (MyDust)

=== Remixes ===
- 1996: Vincent De Moor – "Flowtation" (XL Recordings)
- 1997: Kool World – "In-Vader" (Kool World Records)
- 1997: The Vinyl Frontier – "Vibe to the 7" (Sound Design)
- 1998: Marmion – "Schöneberg" (FFRR)
- 2000: Josh Wink & Lil' Louis – "French Kiss" (FFRR)
- 2000: Angelic – "It's My Turn" (Serious Records)
- 2000: DJ Sandy vs. Housetrap – "Overdrive" (Positiva)
- 2000: Darude – "Sandstorm" (Neo Records)
- 2000: Storm – "Time to Burn" (Data)
- 2000: DJ Jean – "The Launch" (AM:PM)
- 2001: Warp Brothers – "Phatt Bass" (Nu Life)
- 2001: Nigel Gee – "Hootin' Harry" (Neo Records)
- 2001: Joshua Ryan – "Pistolwhip" (Nu Life)
