= Everybody on the Floor (Pump It) =

1994 single by Tokyo Ghetto Pussy

Single by Tokyo Ghetto Pussy

from the album Disco 2001
- Released: 1994
- Length: 3:38
- Label: Dance Pool; JAM!
- Songwriters: Trancy Spacer; Spacy Trancer
- Producers: Trancy Spacer; Spacy Trancer

Tokyo Ghetto Pussy singles chronology
"Everybody on the Floor (Pump It)" (1994)	"I Kiss Your Lips" (1995)

"Everybody on the Floor (Pump It)" is a song by German electronic dance music duo Tokyo Ghetto Pussy, an alias of Jam & Spoon. It was released in 1994 as the lead single from their album, Disco 2001. The song was a success in a number of countries, particularly in Australia, Belgium and Finland, where it reached the top 10.

== Track listing ==
1. "Everybody on the Floor (Pump It)" (Luvdup in Osaka mix) – 7:25
2. "Everybody on the Floor (Pump It)" (Luvdup in Tokyo mix) – 7:45
3. "Everybody on the Floor (Pump It)" (Sure Is Pure in Tokyo mix) – 8:34
4. "Everybody on the Floor (Pump It)" (Sure Is Pure in Osaka mix) – 8:34

== Charts ==
=== Weekly charts ===
Weekly chart performance for "Everybody on the Floor (Pump It)"
Chart (1994–1995)	Peak position
Australia (ARIA)	6
Belgium (Ultratop 50 Flanders)	5
Belgium (Ultratop 50 Wallonia)	35
Canada Dance/Urban (RPM)	1
Finland (Suomen virallinen lista)	10
Germany (GfK)	81
New Zealand (Recorded Music NZ)	14
UK Singles (Official Charts)	26

=== Year-end charts ===
Year-end chart performance for "Everybody on the Floor (Pump It)"
Chart (1995)	Position
Australia (ARIA)	53
Belgium (Ultratop 50 Flanders)	31
Canada Dance/Urban (RPM)	4

== Certifications ==
Certifications and sales for "Everybody on the Floor (Pump It)"
Region	Certification	Certified units/sales
Australia (ARIA)	Gold	35,000^{^}
^{^} Shipments figures based on certification alone.

== Release history ==
Release dates and formats for "Everybody on the Floor (Pump It)"
Region	Date	Format(s)	Label(s)	Ref.
Europe	1994	CD	Dance Pool; JAM!	
Australia	27 February 1995	CD; cassette	Dance Pool	
Australia	12 June 1995	CD; cassette (remixes)	Dance Pool	
United Kingdom	4 September 1995	12-inch vinyl; CD; cassette	Epic	
