= List of Cash Box Top 100 number-one singles of 1990 =

These are the singles that reached number one on the Top 100 Singles chart in 1990 as published by Cash Box magazine.

Key
†	Indicates best-performing single of 1990

Issue date	Song	Artist
January 6	"Another Day in Paradise"	Phil Collins
January 13	"Another Day in Paradise"	Phil Collins
January 20	"Pump Up the Jam"	Technotronic featuring Felly
January 27	"Pump Up the Jam"	Technotronic featuring Felly
February 3	"Downtown Train"	Rod Stewart
February 10	"Opposites Attract"	Paula Abdul with Wild Pair
February 17	"Opposites Attract"	Paula Abdul with Wild Pair
February 24	"Two to Make It Right"	Seduction
March 3	"Dangerous"	Roxette
March 10	"Escapade"	Janet Jackson
March 17	"Escapade"	Janet Jackson
March 24	"Escapade"	Janet Jackson
March 31	"Black Velvet"	Alannah Myles
April 7	"Black Velvet"	Alannah Myles
April 14	"Love Will Lead You Back"	Taylor Dayne
April 21	"I'll Be Your Everything"	Tommy Page
April 28	"Nothing Compares 2 U"	Sinéad O'Connor
May 5	"Nothing Compares 2 U"	Sinéad O'Connor
May 12	"Nothing Compares 2 U"	Sinéad O'Connor
May 19	"Vogue" †	Madonna
May 26	"Vogue" †	Madonna
June 2	"All I Wanna Do Is Make Love To You"	Heart
June 9	"Vogue" †	Madonna
June 16	"Hold On"	Wilson Phillips
June 23	"Step By Step"	New Kids On The Block
June 30	"Step By Step"	New Kids On The Block
July 7	"Step By Step"	New Kids On The Block
July 14	"Step By Step"	New Kids On The Block
July 21	"Step By Step"	New Kids On The Block
July 28	"She Ain't Worth It"	Glenn Medeiros featuring Bobby Brown
August 4	"She Ain't Worth It"	Glenn Medeiros featuring Bobby Brown
August 11	"Vision of Love"	Mariah Carey
August 18	"Vision of Love"	Mariah Carey
August 25	"Come Back To Me"	Janet Jackson
September 1	"If Wishes Came True"	Sweet Sensation
September 8	"Blaze Of Glory"	Jon Bon Jovi
September 15	"Blaze Of Glory"	Jon Bon Jovi
September 22	"Thieves In The Temple"	Prince
September 29	"Thieves In The Temple"	Prince
October 6	"(Can't Live Without Your) Love and Affection"	Nelson
October 13	"Praying For Time"	George Michael
October 20	"Praying For Time"	George Michael
October 27	"I Don't Have The Heart"	James Ingram
November 3	"Ice Ice Baby"	Vanilla Ice
November 10	"Ice Ice Baby"	Vanilla Ice
November 17	"Love Takes Time"	Mariah Carey
November 24	"Love Takes Time"	Mariah Carey
December 1	"I'm Your Baby Tonight"	Whitney Houston
December 8	"I'm Your Baby Tonight"	Whitney Houston
December 15	"Because I Love You (The Postman Song)"	Stevie B
December 22	"Because I Love You (The Postman Song)"	Stevie B
December 29	"Justify My Love"	Madonna

== See also ==
- 1990 in music
- List of Hot 100 number-one singles of 1990 (U.S.)
