= Right in the Night =

1993 single by Jam & Spoon

"Right in the Night (Fall in Love with Music)"

Single by Jam & Spoon featuring Plavka

from the album Tripomatic Fairytales 2001
- B-side: "Follow Me!"
- Released: 1993
- Studio: Allstar Warehouse (Frankfurt, Germany)
- Genre: Eurodance; trance
- Length: 6:05; 3:47 (radio edit)
- Label: JAM!; Dance Pool
- Songwriters: Jam El Mar; Mark Spoon; Nosie Katzmann
- Producers: Jam El Mar; Mark Spoon

Jam & Spoon singles chronology
"The Complete Stella" (1992)	"Right in the Night (Fall in Love with Music)" (1993)	"Find Me (Odyssey to Anyoona)" (1994)

Music video
- "Right in the Night" on YouTube

"Right in the Night (Fall in Love with Music)" is a song by German electronic music duo Jam & Spoon, released by labels JAM! and Dance Pool as the second single from the duo's second album, Tripomatic Fairytales 2001 (1993). It is a Eurodance song with elements from progressive and vocal trance. It is based on "Leyenda" by the classical composer Isaac Albéniz and features vocals by American vocalist Plavka, with lyrics by Nosie Katzmann. The flamenco-styled riff in the song is played by duo member Jam El Mar, who was trained as a classical guitarist.

The single was released in 1993 on the German labels JAM! and Dance Pool. It is widely regarded as one of the biggest electronic music anthems of the 1990s, reaching number one in Finland, Greece and Spain, as well as number two in Australia, Iceland and Italy in 1994. On the Eurochart Hot 100, "Right in the Night" peaked at number four. On the UK Singles Chart, the song originally peaked at number 31, but after a re-release in 1995 it reached a new peak of number ten. It has been extensively anthologised, further indicating the song's significance in trance music's evolution.

Jam & Spoon and Plavka performed the song on many different European TV-shows and concerts, like the British music chart television programme Top of the Pops, the Italian singing competition Festivalbar and the Finnish 1994 national final of Eurovision Song Contest. It earned the duo an award in the category for Best Progressive hi-NRG Recording at the 1995 Hi-NRG Music Awards in the US and a nomination for Best Dance Act at the 1994 MTV Europe Music Awards. The accompanying music video was directed by Matt Broadley and filmed in London.

== Background and release ==
German electronic music duo Jam & Spoon was formed in 1991 in Frankfurt, consisting of composers and producers Rolf Ellmer (a.k.a. Jam El Mar, classically trained composer) and Markus Löffel (a.k.a. Mark Spoon, DJ). They had their first hit with the 1992 song "Stella", which was widely played, remixed and bootlegged in the dance club community for years after its release. The pair also remixed the singles "The Age of Love" and "Go". But their biggest commercial success came in 1993 with "Right in the Night". It is based on a piece that El Mar used to play as a guitarist, "Leyenda" by the classical composer Isaac Albéniz. To make it fit into the new song, El Mar had to compose some additional notes. "Right in the Night" originally was an instrumental track, but after their record company CBS Sony Music demanded a single release for the radio, the duo agreed to do something to the track and add a vocal. Mark Spoon looked into his notebook and found the number to American singer Plavka who he met at the first Love Parade. In an interview, El Mar told about how the duo found Plavka, "Mark Spoon knew Plavka from the very first Love Parade. He was clever enough to ask for her number so, when we were about to record "Right in the Night", he opened his magic book of secret telephone numbers."

German songwriter and producer Nosie Katzmann wrote the lyrics for the song and Jam & Spoon called Plavka and invited her to their studio in Frankfurt. While recording the vocals, she had a hangover since she had been out at a club the night before. But the duo was very satisfied with the result. In the 2017 book Stars of 90's Dance Pop: 29 Hitmakers Discuss Their Careers by James Arena, Katzmann told, "I always felt "Right in the Night" was one of the best songs I've ever written, but the record company and A&R people who came to my place to listen to new songs for the project just thought of "Right" as being average. Some other individuals from A&R asked, "Where's the hook—the punchline?" I really hated to play the song for the record company, and a week before it came out I thought for sure it would be a flop because the label people just didn't hear the hit in it. And just like most times, the label people were wrong." Regarding the lyrics of the song, Spoon demanded in an interview with Melody Maker in January 1994, "Listen to the lyrics. They say something. It's about psychologically ill people falling in love with music. It can't solve your problems, but it certainly helps."

After being released in Europe in 1993, the single was released in the US in late May 1994 with remixes by Marc "MK" Kinchen. In 2013, the song was released in a new remix, by Jam & Spoon vs. David May & Amfree.

== Critical reception ==
Barry Walters from The Advocate wrote that the song "distills Jam & Spoon's most accessible aspects into one flawlessly girly flamenco-style hi-NRG anthem." Larry Flick from Billboard magazine described it as a "jumpy, disco/pop ditty that strobes with bright synths and a killer hook." He noted that "at first, singer Plavka will have you thinking of Madonna, though her own unique tones and nuances eventually shine through. She has a field day with the song, more than holding her own against the track's busy array of sound effects." In a 1997 review, the magazine called it a "percolating ditty [that] was years ahead of its time, since the groove and synths sound as fresh as ever. And the splashes of flamenco guitars are an enticing flavor". Annette M. Lai from the Gavin Report felt that "this high-energy tune should have no trouble making its way up the chart soon." In his weekly UK chart commentary, James Masterton wrote, "It's combination of a brilliant pop tune and rampant flamenco rhythms should be enough to make it the biggest hit of the next few months." On the 1995 re-release he added, "Sweet music to my ears, I love this to bits and commented in these lines back in 1994 that it had the potential to be a No.1 hit – I could still be right." British duo Orbital reviewed the song for Melody Maker. Paul Hartnoll said, "Wow! Euro-disco. It sounds like Baccara. Yes sir, Jam & Spoon can boogie!" He added, "This'd be good horse-riding music. It makes me think of Army of Lovers. And ABBA. All those things."

The magazine's Jennifer Nine declared it as "another soon-to-be-everywhere groove thing from top German dancemeisters", remarking the "sparkly flamenco guitar intro" and vocalist Plavka looking "kinda handbag-Ofra Haza on the sleeve". She concluded, "A biggish, whooshy, authoritative thing". Pan-European magazine Music & Media commented, "This fast but mellow house track with ambient works so well that it should go a long way to establish this well-reputed remix and production duo as artists in their own right." Columnist Maria Jimenez described it as "alluring, yet highly commercial", adding that "this club track is poised for international success." Andy Beevers from Music Week gave it four out of five, calling it a "rather unexciting Euro house song". Wendi Cermak from The Network Forty stated, "This is signature Jam & Spoon with its ethereal trance/ambient electronic rhythms, light female vocals and their excellent guitar work on the intro". Rupert Howe from NME found that the "disposable Euro-pap" of 'Right in the Night' "measures up a mere hair's breadth away from Culture Beat." James Hamilton from the Record Mirror Dance Update named it an "excellent Madonna-ish Balearic throbber". Andrew Perry from Select viewed it as "a single which is not so much commercial as almost spitefully dreadful, riding on a daft hi-NRG beat, a female vocal from the deepest fetid pit of '80s soul and what sounds like a sample of classical rock bores Sky".

== Chart performance ==
Commercially, "Right in the Night" peaked at number one in Finland and Spain for three and five weeks, respectively, as well as in Greece. The single was a top-10 hit in Australia, Austria, Belgium, Denmark, Germany, Iceland, Italy, the Netherlands, New Zealand, Norway, Sweden, Switzerland and the United Kingdom. In Australia, Iceland and Italy, it reached number two.

In Jam & Spoon's native Germany, the single peaked at number six for one week and spent a total of 29 weeks inside the German Singles Chart. In the UK, it reached number 10 on the UK Singles Chart following a re-release in 1995, on 11 June, while on the UK Dance Singles Chart, it peaked at number six during the same period. Additionally, "Right in the Night" was a top-20 hit in Ireland, peaking at number 18. On the Eurochart Hot 100, the single peaked at number four on 5 March 1994, after five weeks on the chart. In North America, it reached the number-one position on the RPM Dance chart in Canada and number three on the US Billboard Dance Club Play chart. "Right in the Night" earned a gold record in Germany and a platinum record in Australia.

== Music video ==
The accompanying music video of "Right in the Night" was directed by Swedish-based director Matt Broadley of Swedish production company Apollo, Bild & Fell and filmed in London. It received heavy rotation on MTV Europe, who put the video in "Breakout Extra" rotation in February 1994, and was A-listed on Germany's VIVA. There are two different versions of the video, with one that focuses more on Plavka than the other one. There was also made a video for the 2013 remix by Jam & Spoon vs. David May & Amfree.

== Legacy ==
"Right in the Night" earned Jam & Spoon an award in the category for Best Progressive hi-NRG Recording at the 1995 Hi-NRG Music Awards in the United States. Following the success of the song, the duo was also nominated for Best Dance Act at the 1994 MTV Europe Music Awards in Germany.

== Track listings ==
- 12-inch, UK and Europe
1. "Right in the Night (Fall in Love with Music)" (Full Length Mix) – 6:05
2. "Right in the Night (Fall in Love with Music)" (Love Mix) – 5:37
3. "Follow Me!" – 12:28
- CD single, Europe
1. "Right in the Night" (Radio Edit) – 3:47
2. "Right in the Night" (Instrumental) – 6:51
- CD maxi 1, Germany
1. "Right in the Night (Fall in Love with Music)" – 6:05
2. "Right in the Night (Fall in Love with Music)" (Instrumental) – 6:51
3. "Follow Me!" – 12:28
4. "Right in the Night (Fall in Love with Music)" (Radio Edit) – 3:47
- CD maxi 2, Germany
1. "Right in the Night (Fall in Love with Music)" (Jam & Spoon Remix) – 5:45
2. "Right in the Night (Fall in Love with Music)" (Microbots-Remix) – 6:23
3. "Right in the Night (Fall in Love with Music)" (Arpeggiators – Tripomatic Fairytales Mix) – 6:27
4. "Right in the Night (Fall in Love with Music)" (DJ Kid Paul Mix) – 5:52

== Charts ==
=== Weekly charts ===
Chart (1994–1995)	Peak position
Australia (ARIA)	2
Austria (Ö3 Austria Top 40)	7
Belgium (Ultratop 50 Flanders)	7
Canada Dance/Urban (RPM)	1
Denmark (IFPI)	8
Europe (Eurochart Hot 100)	4
Europe (European Dance Radio)	11
Europe (European Hit Radio)	23
Finland (Suomen virallinen lista)	1
Germany (GfK)	6
Iceland (Íslenski Listinn Topp 40)	2
Ireland (IRMA)	18
Israel (Israeli Singles Chart)	10
Italy (Musica e dischi)	2
Netherlands (Dutch Top 40)	11
Netherlands (Single Top 100)	10
New Zealand (Recorded Music NZ)	9
Norway (VG-lista)	4
Quebec (ADISQ)	34
Scottish Singles Sales (Official Charts)	7
Spain (AFYVE)	1
Sweden (Sverigetopplistan)	7
Switzerland (Schweizer Hitparade)	4
UK Singles (Official Charts)	10
UK Dance (Official Charts)	6
UK Airplay (Music Week)	14
UK Dance (Music Week)	5
UK Club Chart (Music Week)	20
UK Club Chart (Music Week) 1995 re-issue	39
UK Pop Tip Club Chart (Music Week) 1995 re-issue	27
US Dance Club Play (Billboard)	3
US Maxi-Singles Sales (Billboard)	29

=== Year-end charts ===
Chart (1994)	Position
Australia (ARIA)	18
Belgium (Ultratop)	48
Canada Dance/Urban (RPM)	4
Europe (Eurochart Hot 100)	26
Germany (Media Control)	29
Iceland (Íslenski Listinn Topp 40)	66
Netherlands (Dutch Top 40)	96
Netherlands (Single Top 100)	87
Sweden (Topplistan)	48
Switzerland (Schweizer Hitparade)	25
US Dance Club Play (Billboard)	49

== Certifications ==
Region	Certification	Certified units/sales
Australia (ARIA)	Platinum	70,000^{^}
Germany (BVMI)	Gold	250,000^{^}
^{^} Shipments figures based on certification alone.

== Release history ==
Region	Date	Format(s)	Label(s)	Ref.
Germany	1993	CD	JAM!; Dance Pool	
Australia	17 January 1994	CD; cassette	Epic; JAM!; Dance Pool	
United Kingdom	7 February 1994	12-inch vinyl; CD; cassette	Epic	
Australia	7 March 1994	12-inch vinyl	Epic; JAM!; Dance Pool	
Japan	21 September 1994	CD	Epic	
United Kingdom (re-release)	29 May 1995	12-inch vinyl; CD; cassette	Epic	
United States	26 August 1997	Rhythmic contemporary; contemporary hit radio	Epic	

== Whigfield cover ==
"Right in the Night"

Single by Whigfield

from the album All in One
- Released: 10 July 2008
- Genre: House
- Length: 4:32
- Label: Off Limits
- Songwriters: Jam El Mar; Mark Spoon; Nosie Katzmann
- Producer: Larry Pignagnoli

Whigfield singles chronology
"Think of You" (2007)	"Right in the Night" (2008)

Music video
- "Right in the Night" on YouTube

Danish recording artist Whigfield covered "Right in the Night" in 2007. It was released on 10 July 2008 as the second single from her greatest hits album All in One (2007).

=== Track listing ===
1. "Right in the Night" (Favretto & Battini Remix Radio Edit) – 3:37
2. "Right in the Night" (F&A Factor Remix Radio Edit) – 3:48
3. "Right in the Night" (Doing Time Remix Radio Edit) – 3:29
4. "Right in the Night" (Original) – 4:32
5. "Right in the Night" (Favretto & Battani Remix Extended) – 7:46
6. "Right in the Night" (F&A Factor Remix Extended) – 7:56
7. "Right in the Night" (Doing Time Remix Extended) – 5:18

== 2013 version ==
"Right in the Night 2013"

Single by Jam & Spoon featuring Plavka vs. David May and Amfree

from the album Best Of
- Released: 26 April 2013
- Length: 3:30 (radio edit)
- Label: Epic
- Songwriters: Jam El Mar; Mark Spoon; Nosie Katzmann
- Producers: Jam El Mar & Mark Spoon; David May; Amfree; Michel Schuhmacher; Marc "Marquito" Zibung

Jam & Spoon singles chronology
"Butterfly Sign" (2004)	"Right in the Night 2013" (2013)	"Be.Angeled 2014" (2014)

Music video
- "Right in the Night 2013" on YouTube

On 26 April 2013, a remix version by David May and Amfree entitled "Right in the Night 2013" was released by Epic Records.

=== Track listings ===
- CD single
1. "Right in the Night 2013" (featuring Plavka vs. David May and Amfree) (featuring Nate) (radio edit) – 3:30
2. "Right in the Night 2013" (featuring Plavka vs. David May and Amfree) (Groove Coverage remix) – 5:28
- Digital download
1. "Right in the Night 2013" (featuring Plavka vs. David May and Amfree) (featuring Nate) (radio edit) – 3:29
2. "Right in the Night 2013" (featuring Plavka vs. David May and Amfree) (Bodybangers remix) – 5:24
3. "Right in the Night 2013" (featuring Plavka vs. David May and Amfree) (Groove Coverage remix) – 5:28
4. "Right in the Night 2013" (featuring Plavka vs. David May and Amfree) (Michael Mind Project remix) – 5:42
5. "Right in the Night 2013" (featuring Plavka vs. David May and Amfree) (radio edit without rap) – 3:13
6. "Right in the Night 2013" (featuring Plavka vs. David May and Amfree) (extended mix) – 5:20
7. "Right in the Night 2013" (featuring Plavka vs. David May and Amfree) (classic mix 2K13) – 4:08

=== Charts ===
Chart (2013)	Peak position
Austria (Ö3 Austria Top 40)	46
Germany (GfK)	38
Switzerland (Schweizer Hitparade)	66
