= Sing It to You =

"Sing It to You (Dee-Doob-Dee-Doo)"

Single by Lavinia Jones

from the album Visions of Velvet Park
- Released: September 26, 1994
- Genre: Eurodance; dance-pop
- Length: 3:34
- Label: Virgin
- Songwriters: Jo Mersmann; Andy Knote
- Producer: Andy Knote

Lavinia Jones singles chronology
"Sing It to You (Dee-Doob-Dee-Doo)" (1994)	"The Sound of Rain" (1995)

Music video
- "Sing It to You (Dee-Doob-Dee-Doo)" on YouTube

"Sing It to You (Dee-Doob-Dee-Doo)" is a song by South-African singer Lavinia Jones, released in September 1994 as her debut-single by Virgin Records, after 5 years searching for the right producer to release it. It is written by Jo Mersmann and Andy Knoteen, and produced by Knote. The song joyed moderate success in Europe, peaking at numbers six and seven in Greece and Austria and becoming a top-50 hit in the UK. In Germany, it was a top-60 hit, with a total of 19 weeks inside the chart. On the Eurochart Hot 100, it reached number 57. Outside Europe, "Sing It to You" was a hit in Israel, peaking at number six. On Music & Media's list of Top 20 Border Breakers 1995, the single reached number 20 in November 1995. The accompanying music video was directed by Thomas Elsner and Sarkis Gazaryan. In 1998, Jones released "Sing It to You – Part II" with remixes by German DJ/production team Sash!.

== Critical reception ==
Pan-European magazine Music & Media remarked, "Because of its similar construction–pop dance with a scatted refrain–the German actress-turned-singer brings back to mind Crystal Waters' 1991 hit 'Gypsy Woman (La da da la da dee)'." Alan Jones from Music Week wrote, "Neither as catchy or annoying as Crystal Waters' La-da-dee, La-da-da doggerel, Lavinia Jones' Dee-doob-dee-doo refrain is nevertheless an insidious and commercial hook that should pay dividends on her first single, 'Sing It to You', which straddles the pop/dance divide very nicely."

Tim Jeffery from the Record Mirror Dance Update said, "Don't know much about this person but from the sound of it, Lavinia is a Suzanne Vega-type pop singer who's been given the dance mix treatment in an attempt to break her since this pleasant song with its catchy 'dee-doob-dee-doo' scatting sounds a little out of place in the garage context in which it's been put. Still, Deep Recess have done a fine job in creating a good groove with stabbing synths and piano that works well."

== Music video ==
The music video for "Sing It to You (Dee-Doob-Dee-Doo)" was directed by Thomas Elsner and Sarkis Gazaryan. In the video, Jones performs and dances in front of a completely white background, which is sometimes blue or pink. She wears dresses of various colors throughout the video. Occasionally, there are close-ups of various flowers. And some scenes also show the singer in a hammock, on or by a sofa, and her sprinkling rose petals on the ground. The video was B-listed on German music television channel VIVA in November 1994. Two months later, it received "prime break out" rotation on MTV Europe.

== Track listing ==
- 7", UK (1994)
1. "Sing It to You (Dee-Doob-Dee-Doo)" (radio edit) – 3:34
2. "Sing It to You (Dee-Doob-Dee-Doo)" (A Night at the Club mix) – 5:13
- 12", Germany (1994)
1. "Sing It to You (Dee-Doob-Dee-Doo)" (A Night at the Bar mix) – 5:15
2. "Sing It to You (Dee-Doob-Dee-Doo)" (A Night in Trance mix) – 5:23
- CD single, UK (1994)
1. "Sing It to You (Dee-Doob-Dee-Doo)" (radio edit) – 3:34
2. "Sing It to You (Dee-Doob-Dee-Doo)" (A Night at the Club mix) – 5:13
3. "Sing It to You (Dee-Doob-Dee-Doo)" (A Night at the Bar mix) – 5:15
4. "Sing It to You (Dee-Doob-Dee-Doo)" (A Night Trance mix) – 5:23
- CD single, Germany (1998)
1. "Sing It to You – Part II" (Sash! radio edit) – 3:35
2. "Sing It to You – Part II" (Sash! extended mix) – 6:15
3. "Sing It to You" (A Night at the Club mix) – 5:13
4. "Sing It to You" (original radio edit) – 3:34

== Charts ==
Chart (1994–1995)	Peak position
Austria (Ö3 Austria Top 40)	7
Europe (Eurochart Hot 100)	57
Europe (European Dance Radio)	17
Europe (European Hit Radio)	27
Germany (GfK)	52
Greece (Pop + Rock)	6
Israel (Israeli Singles Chart)	6
Scotland (OCC)	34
UK Singles (OCC)	45
UK Dance (OCC)	30
UK Club Chart (Music Week)	20
UK Pop Tip Club Chart (Music Week)	29
