= European Dance Radio Chart =

European music chart

The European Dance Radio Chart (also known as European Dance Radio Top 25) was a weekly chart compiled by pan-European magazine Music & Media. After dance music had played a more dominant role on the magazine's Eurochart Hot 100 in the beginning of the 1990s, the new chart was launched on 28 September 1991. Based on a weighted-scoring system, it was compiled on the basis of playlists of European stations programming various styles of dance music, including Eurodance, hip hop/rap, R&B and swingbeat, for the 15-30 year-olds, fulltime or during specific dayparts. The first number one single on the EDR Chart was "Gett Off" by Prince.

== Number one singles on European Dance Radio Top 25 ==
=== 1991 ===
- Prince - "Gett Off" (28 September 1991)
- P.M. Dawn - "Set Adrift on Memory Bliss" (19 October 1991)
- Simply Red - "Something Got Me Started" (2 November 1991)
- Lisa Stansfield - "Change" (23 November 1991)
- Michael Jackson - "Black or White" (21 December 1991)

=== 1992 ===
- DNA - "Can You Handle It" (15 February 1992)
- Shanice - "I Love Your Smile" (29 February 1992)
- Soul II Soul - "Joy" (11 April 1992)
- Swing Out Sister - "Am I the Same Girl" (23 May 1992)
- Kris Kross - "Jump" (4 July 1992)
- Snap! - "Rhythm Is a Dancer" (18 July 1992)
- Joe Public - "Live and Learn" (1 August 1992)
- Bobby Brown - "Humpin' Around" (5 September 1992)
- Prince - "My Name Is Prince" (7 November 1992)
- Madonna - "Erotica" (21 November 1992)
- Arrested Development - "People Everyday" (12 December 1992)
- Whitney Houston - "I Will Always Love You" (19 December 1992)

=== 1993 ===
- Arrested Development - "Mr. Wendal" (13 February 1993)
- U.S.U.R.A. - "Open Your Mind" (27 February 1993)
- 2 Unlimited - "No Limit" (13 March 1993)
- Naughty by Nature - "Hip Hop Hooray" (3 April 1993)
- Whitney Houston - "I'm Every Woman" (10 April 1993)
- Robin S. - "Show Me Love" (1 May 1993)
- Jade - "Don't Walk Away" (15 May 1993)
- Janet Jackson - "That's the Way Love Goes" (5 June 1993)
- 2 Unlimited - "Tribal Dance" (12 June 1993)
- Chaka Demus & Pliers - "Tease Me" (24 July 1993)
- M People - "One Night in Heaven" (7 August 1993)
- Shara Nelson - "Down That Road" (11 September 1993)
- Robin S. - "Luv 4 Luv" (18 September 1993)
- Mariah Carey - "Dreamlover" (25 September 1993)
- De La Soul - "Breakadawn" (13 November 1993)
- Culture Beat - "Got to Get It" (20 November 1993)

=== 1994 ===
- Urban Cookie Collective - "Feels Like Heaven" (8 January 1994)
- 2 Unlimited - "Maximum Overdrive" (29 January 1994)
- 2 Unlimited - "Let the Beat Control Your Body" (12 February 1994)
- Culture Beat - "Anything" (26 March 1994)
- Cappella - "Move on Baby" (23 April 1994)
- Des'ree - "You Gotta Be" (30 April 1994)
- CB Milton - "It's a Loving Thing" (7 May 1994)
- Crystal Waters - "100% Pure Love" (14 May 1994)
- Cappella - "U & Me" (23 July 1994)
- Jam & Spoon - "Find Me (Odyssey to Anyoona)" (27 August 1994)
- La Bouche - "Sweet Dreams" (3 September 1994)
- Whigfield - "Saturday Night" (29 October 1994)
- Ice MC - "It's a Rainy Day" (12 November 1994)

=== 1995 ===
- Ice MC - "It's a Rainy Day" (7 January 1995)
- Baby D - "Let Me Be Your Fantasy" (4 February 1995)
- Ini Kamoze - "Here Comes the Hotstepper" (11 February 1995)
- N-Trance - "Set You Free" (4 March 1995)
- Snap! - "The First the Last Eternity" (11 March 1995)
- Captain Hollywood Project - "Flying High" (18 March 1995)
- Corona - "Baby Baby" (15 April 1995)
- Moby - "Everytime You Touch Me" (22 April 1995)
- La Bouche - "Be My Lover" (13 May 1995)
- Haddaway - "Fly Away" (10 June 1995)
- Michael Jackson & Janet Jackson - "Scream" (17 June 1995)
- Jam & Spoon - "Angel" (1 July 1995)
- Diana King - "Shy Guy" (15 July 1995)
- Corona - "Try Me Out" (19 August 1995)
- Janet Jackson - "Runaway" (14 October 199)
- Coolio - "Gangsta's Paradise" (2 December 1995)

== See also ==
- Music & Media on World Radio History
