= Plavka =

American musician

Plavka Coleridge
- Born: Plavka Lonich; San Jose, California, U.S.
- Genres: Electronic
- Occupations: Singer, songwriter, performer, DJ and producer
- Instruments: Vocals
- Years active: 1989–present
- Formerly of: Jam & Spoon, The Shamen, Rising High Collective

Plavka Coleridge (née Lonich) is a musician, vocalist, songwriter, producer and DJ. She is best known for being the singer of the German electronic music group Jam & Spoon, whose classically infused trance sound dominated the international charts in the mid-1990s, as well as for her previous stint with the Shamen.

== Biography ==
Plavka is the daughter of a Peruvian mother and Croatian father. Plavka started her vocal training throughout her childhood. She moved from Los Angeles to London, where she joined the Scottish band the Shamen as a vocalist. With the Shamen she toured Europe and Asia, Moscow and Siberia.

In the 1990s, Plavka met Caspar Pound, a producer, composer and owner of Rising High Records. They formed Rising High Collective with producer Peter Smith. RHC performed at Omen music club in Frankfurt and was part of the Frankfurt techno scene in the 1990s. In 1993, she recorded the song Right in the Night with Jam & Spoon which became an international hit and earned a Gold disc in Germany and a Platinum disc in Australia. Jam & Spoon continued working with Plavka and produced songs including Find Me, Butterfly Sign, and Angel. For the 1997 album Kaleidoscope Plavka wrote the songs Guiding Light, Flame, Moment Gone, Garden of Eden and the single Kaleidoscope Skies.

== Personal life ==
Plavka married Christopher Coleridge in 2006; they have a daughter. Her younger brother is guitarist Yogi Lonich, who was a member of Buckcherry, Fuel, and Chris Cornell's live band.

== Discography ==
=== Albums ===
- En-Tact (1990)
- Tripomatic Fairytales 2001 (1993)
- Kaleidoscope (1997)
- Tripomatic Fairytales 3003 (2004)
- Remixes & Club Classics (2006)
- Plavkalicious (2009)

=== Singles ===
- "Chance Me" Plavka, (1988) Mainline Records
- "Hyperreal" The Shamen feat. Plavka (1990) One Little Indian
- "Fever Called Love" Rising High Collective (1991) R&S Records
- "Reach" Rising High Collective (1992) Rising High Records
- "Maximum Motion" Plavka (1993) Ascension Records
- "Right in the Night (Fall in Love with Music)" Jam & Spoon feat. Plavka (1993) JAM! Sony Dance Pool
- "Find Me (Odyssey to Anyoona)" Jam & Spoon feat. Plavka (1994) JAM! Sony Dance Pool
- "Liquid Thoughts" (EP feat Tangled in My Thoughts) Rising High Collective (1994) Rising High Records
- "Feel the Fire" RHC feat. Plavka (1995) Ascension Records
- "Angel (Ladadi O-Heyo)" Jam & Spoon feat. Plavka (1995) JAM! Sony Dance Pool
- "Kaleidoscope Skies" Jam & Spoon feat. Plavka (1997) JAM! Sony Dance Pool
- "Don't Call It Love" Jam & Spoon feat. Plavka (1998) JAM! Sony Dance Pool
- "Your Everything" Mistral feat. Plavka (2002) Black Hole
- "Butterfly Sign" Jam & Spoon feat. Plavka (2004) Universal Music
- "Razorblade" Ils feat. Plavka (2007) Distinctive Records
- "Love Sick" NUfrequency feat. Plavka (2007) Rebirth
- "Love Story" Rudenko feat. Plavka (2009) Be Yourself Music
- "Surrender" J Nitti feat. Plavka (2010) Armada Records
- "Red light Town" Swagger feat. Plavka (2012) Housepital Records
- "Right in the Night 2013" Jam & Spoon feat. Plavka Mixed by David May & Amfree (2013) Sony Columbia
- "Uh Oh" Plavka 2020 (2021) Plavka Music
- "Modern Tragedy" written & performed by Plavka. Produced by Zootrop (2021)
- "Underneath the Hollywood Sign" EP Plavka (2021) Plavka Music
- "On a High Frequency" Plavka (2022) Plavka Music
- "Winking at Me" Plavka (2023) Kool Kreatures
- "Chain of Love" Plavka (2023) Kool Kreatures
- "In the VIP" Plavka (2023) Kool Kreatures
- "international Freak" Plavka (2023) Kool Kreatures
- "Underbelly" Plavka (2023) Kool Kreatures
- "Hands On" Plavka (2024) Kool Kreatures
- "Wet Hot Baby" Plavka (2024) Kool Kreatures
- "Contagious" Plavka (2024) Kool Kreatures
- "Night Ride" Plavka (2024) Kool Kreatures
- "Rave & Misbehave" Plavka (2024) Kool Kreatures
- "Black Stiletto" Plavka (2025) Kool Kreatures
- "ELECTRIC FIELDS FOREVER" PLAVKA (2025) Kool Kreatures
- "Strap Me In" PLAVKA (2025) Direct Action Records
- "Space Biscuit" PLAVKA (2025) Kool Kreatures
- "Cyber Heart" PLAVKA (2025) Decypher HARD
- "All About that Bass" (2025) Direct Action Records
