= Jam & Spoon =

German electronic music duo

- Also known as: Tokyo Ghetto Pussy, Storm, Trancy Spacer & Spacy Trancer, Big Room
- Origin: Frankfurt, Germany
- Genres: Trance, Eurodance, house, trip hop
- Years active: 1991–2005
- Labels: Logic Records, R & S Records, Epic, Sony DancePool, JAM!, Polydor/Island/Universal, Vandit
- Past members: Rolf Ellmer; Markus Löffel; Plavka Lonich
- Website: Official website

Jam & Spoon were a German electronic music duo formed in 1991 in Frankfurt. The group consisted of composers and producers Rolf Ellmer (a.k.a. Jam El Mar, classically trained composer) and Markus Löffel (a.k.a. Mark Spoon, DJ). They also worked under the pseudonyms Tokyo Ghetto Pussy, Storm and Big Room. Under these pseudonyms, the credits on the albums are listed as Trancy Spacer and Spacy Trancer.

== Biography ==
Jam & Spoon's first album, BreaksUnit1, was released in 1991. They had their first hit with the 1992 song "Stella", which was widely played, remixed and bootlegged in the dance club community for years after its release. The pair also remixed the singles "The Age of Love" and "Go". Their first international and commercial success came in 1993, with the single "Right in the Night", followed by "Find Me (Odyssey to Anyoona)" and "Angel (Ladadi O-Heyo)". These tracks featured vocals by the singer, Plavka Lonich, following the first of which, she was welcomed as the third member, frequently co-writing and performing live. The albums Tripomatic Fairytales 2001 and Tripomatic Fairytales 2002 were released in 1994, followed by Disco 2001 (1995) as Tokyo Ghetto Pussy, Kaleidoscope (1997), Stormjunkie (2000) as Storm, and finally Tripomatic Fairytales 3003 (2005).

In 2000, they remixed "The Chase," a 1979 Giorgio Moroder track. Credited to 'Giorgio Moroder vs. Jam & Spoon', the song reached number 1 on the US Billboard Hot Dance Music/Club Play chart. In June 2002, "Be.Angeled" peaked at No. 4 on that chart.

Markus Löffel died of a heart attack in his Berlin flat, on 11 January 2006 at the age of 39.

In September 2006, a two compact disc set entitled Remixes & Club Classics was released to celebrate Mark Spoon. It is the first compilation of the duo's collected works, and featured an exclusive track "Be.Angeled – Tribute to Mark Spoon", performed live at the 2006 Love Parade in Berlin.

== As Tokyo Ghetto Pussy ==
Tokyo Ghetto Pussy
- Origin: Frankfurt, Germany
- Genre: Hardcore techno
- Years active: 1994–1998
- Label: JAM!

Tokyo Ghetto Pussy was a project by Ellmer and Löffel, also under the pseudonym Trancy Spacer and Spacy Trancer. They have a cyberpunk/manga-style mascot named Chichi on the album cover of Disco 2001 and the singles. Their most popular singles as Tokyo Ghetto Pussy were "I Kiss Your Lips", "Everybody on the Floor (Pump It)" and "Fly Me to the Moon".

== As Storm ==
Storm was the trance production duo of Ellmer and Löffel, who achieved most of their success in the 1990s.

In 2000, they released the album Stormjunkie, which spawned the No. 3 UK hit, "Time to Burn". Their other chart hits in the UK were "Storm" (No. 32 in both 1998 and 2001) and "Storm Animal" (No. 21, 2000).

== Discography ==
=== Studio albums ===
As Jam & Spoon

- Breaks Unit 1 (1991)
- Tripomatic Fairytales 2001 (1993) – GER No. 52, UK No. 71, AUS No. 57
- Tripomatic Fairytales 2002 (1993)
- Kaleidoscope (1997) – GER No. 40
- Tripomatic Fairytales 3003 (2004) – GER No. 23

=== Compilation albums ===
- Remixes & Club Classics (2006)
- Best Of (2015)

As Tokyo Ghetto Pussy

- Disco 2001 (1995) – AUS No. 43, NED No. 86

As Storm

- Stormjunkie (2000)

=== Singles ===
As Jam & Spoon

Year	Title	Peak chart positions												Album
Year	Title	GER	AUS	AUT	FIN	IRE	ITA	NED	NZ	SWE	SWI	UK	US Dance	Album
1992	"Tales from a Danceographic Ocean"	—	—	—	—	—	—	—	—	—	—	49	—	Non-album single
1992	"Stella"^{[A]}	—	—	—	—	—	—	—	—	—	—	66	—	Tripomatic Fairytales 2001
1993	"Right in the Night (Fall in Love with Music)"^{[B]} (featuring Plavka)	6	2	7	1	18	2	10	9	7	4	10	3	Tripomatic Fairytales 2001
1994	"Find Me (Odyssey to Anyoona)" (featuring Plavka)	17	22	—	1	24	6	20	34	—	20	22	16	Tripomatic Fairytales 2001
1995	"Angel (Ladadi O-Heyo)" (featuring Plavka)	30	59	—	3	—	2	41	—	—	28	26	—	Tripomatic Fairytales 2001
1995	"You Gotta Say Yes to Another Excess – Great Mission" (Jam & Spoon's Hands On Yello)	28	—	—	—	—	—	—	—	—	—	—	—	Non-album single
1997	"Kaleidoscope Skies" (featuring Plavka)	16	—	18	—	—	20	—	—	—	—	48	—	Kaleidoscope
1997	"El Baile"	56	—	—	—	—	—	—	—	—	—	—	—	Kaleidoscope
1997	"Don't Call It Love" (featuring Plavka)	78	—	—	—	—	—	—	—	—	—	—	—	Kaleidoscope
1999	"Stella 1999 – 1992 – How Stella Got Her Groove Back"	55	—	—	—	—	—	—	—	—	—	—	—	Non-album singles
2000	"The Chase" (Giorgio Moroder vs. Jam & Spoon)	44	—	—	—	—	25	68	—	—	75	—	1	Non-album singles
2001	"Be.Angeled" (featuring Rea)	16	—	15	—	—	—	95	—	—	53	31	4	Non-album singles
2004	"Cynical Heart" (featuring Jim Kerr)	52	—	50	—	—	—	—	—	—	—	—	—	Tripomatic Fairytales 3003
2004	"Set Me Free (Empty Rooms)" (featuring Rea)	22	—	57	—	—	—	—	—	—	—	—	—	Tripomatic Fairytales 3003
2004	"Butterfly Sign" (featuring Plavka)	67	—	—	—	—	—	—	—	—	—	—	—	Tripomatic Fairytales 3003
2013	"Right in the Night 2013" (featuring Plavka vs. David May and Amfree)	38	—	46	—	—	—	—	—	—	66	—	—	Best Of
2014	"Be.Angeled 2014" (featuring Rea)	—	—	—	—	—	—	—	—	—	—	—	—	Best Of
2015	"Find Me 2015"	—	—	—	—	—	—	—	—	—	—	—	—	Best Of
"—" denotes items which were not released in that country or failed to chart.

- ^{^[A]} The single was released as "The Complete Stella" in certain territories.
- ^{^[B]} "Right in the Night" reached No. 31 in the UK in its first release in 1994, but a re-release the following year peaked higher at No. 10.

As Tokyo Ghetto Pussy

Year	Single	Peak chart positions								Certifications	Album
Year	Single	GER	AUS	BEL (Fl)	BEL (Wa)	FIN	NED	NZ	UK	Certifications	Album
1995	"Everybody on the Floor (Pump It)"	81	6	5	35	10	—	14	26	AUS: Gold	Disco 2001
1995	"I Kiss Your Lips"	94	8	—	—	—	5	39	55	AUS: Gold	Disco 2001
1996	"To Another Galaxy"	—	71	—	—	—	31	—	—		Disco 2001
1998	"You Make Me Feel"	—	—	—	—	—	—	—	—		Singles only
2002	"Fly Me to the Moon"	—	—	—	—	—	—	—	—		Singles only
"—" denotes releases that did not chart

As Storm

- "Storm" (1998) - UK No. 32
- "Huri-Khan" (1998)
- "Love Is Here to Stay" (1999)
- "Time to Burn" (2000) - UK No. 3
- "Storm Animal" (2000) - UK No. 21
- "We Love" (2001)
- "Storm" (reissue) (2001) - UK No. 32

== See also ==
- List of number-one dance hits (United States)
- List of artists who reached number one on the US Dance chart
