= Mark Spoon =

German musician and producer (1966–2006)

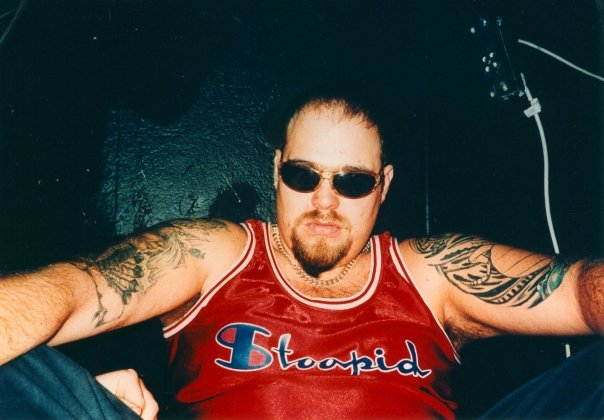
- Mark Spoon

Background information
- Also known as: Spacey Trancer
- Born: 27 November 1966
- Origin: Frankfurt, West Germany
- Died: 11 January 2006 (aged 39); Berlin, Germany
- Genre: Trance
- Occupations: Musician, record producer, DJ
- Years active: 1980s–2006

Mark Spoon (27 November 1966 – 11 January 2006) was a disc jockey, musician and record producer from Frankfurt am Main, Germany.

== Biography ==
Together with Rolf Ellmer (Jam El Mar) he recorded under several monikers, including Jam & Spoon, Tokyo Ghetto Pussy and Storm. He also produced and remixed many other artists as well as becoming a veteran performer many times at Berlin's Love Parade.

Spoon, born as Markus Löffel, began his professional career as a cook before changing direction and working as a DJ in the late 1980s. He adopted the stage name Mark Spoon, a direct translation of his birth name: Löffel is the German word for spoon. In the early 1990s he teamed up with Jam El Mar (a classically trained guitarist) as Jam & Spoon. Their greatest hits (in Germany) were "Right in the Night" (1994) and "Kaleidoscope skies" (1997). Spoon was a pioneer in trance music and remixed seminal tracks, including Moby's Go (In Dub Mix) (1992), in addition to his work under other names. In 2001 he performed in the German film Be Angeled, for which he also contributed the title song.

In January 2006, he was found dead in his Berlin apartment after suffering a heart attack. The 2006 Love Parade contained a live performance of "Be Angeled" in tribute of Spoon.
