= Rolf Ellmer =

Rolf Johannes Ellmer
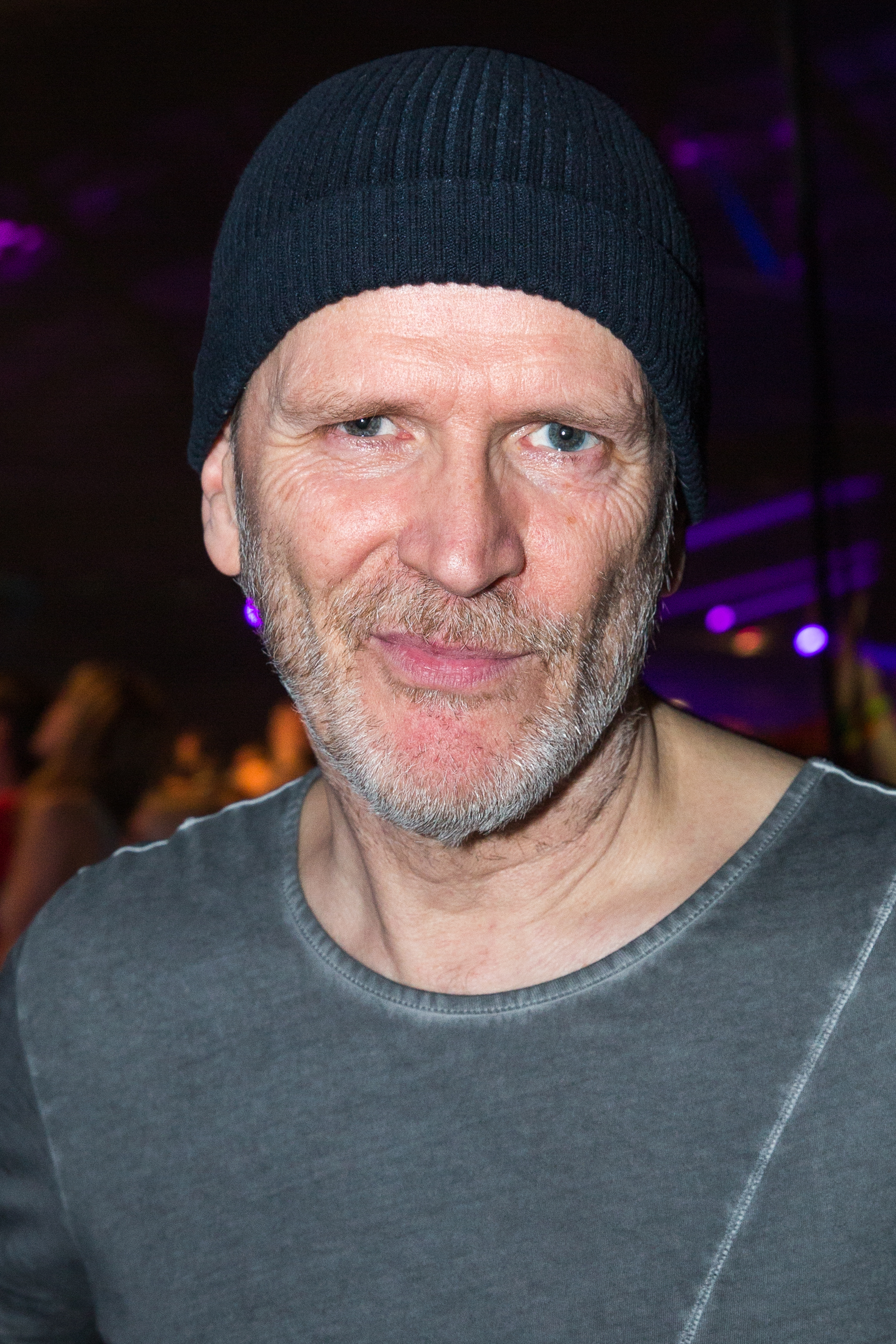
- Ellmer in 2017

Background information
- Also known as: Jam, Jam El Mar, Trancey Spacer
- Born: 3 December 1960 (age 65)
- Origin: Karlsruhe, Germany
- Genres: Electronic, techno, trance, trip hop
- Occupations: Songwriter, record producer, musician, DJ
- Instruments: Synthesizer, guitar
- Years active: 1990–present
- Labels: Jam El Mar REC, Allstar Music Productions, Coldharbour Recordings, Perfecto Records, Tronic, Truesoul, Bonzai, Cherry Moon Records
- Website: jam-el-mar.com, www.jamandspoon.de

Rolf Johannes Ellmer (born 3 December 1960) is a German record producer, songwriter, DJ and classically trained musician. He is one of Germany's best-known producers in the techno and trance scene.

== Career ==
Together with Markus Löffel (a.k.a. Mark Spoon), also from the German music scene, they recorded under several monikers such as Jam & Spoon, Tokyo Ghetto Pussy and Storm. Ellmer was a member of the group Dance 2 Trance, along with Dag Lerner (a.k.a DJ Dag), which had success all over the world and he is considered to be one of the pioneers of trance music.

A string of hits as Jam & Spoon include "Right in the Night", "Stella", "Kaleidoscope Skies", "How Stella Got Her Groove Back", and "Set Me Free (Empty Rooms)".

Ellmer has also worked as a producer and remixer for other artists such as Deep Forest, Enigma, Moby, and Frankie Goes to Hollywood. Furthermore, he is recognized for being a successful DJ.
