= List of Eurodance songs =

The following is a chronological list of Eurodance songs.

== Late 1980s ==
Year	Artist	Origin	Song
1989	Culture Beat	Germany	"Der Erdbeermund"
1989	Black Box	Italy	"Ride On Time"
1989	Technotronic	Belgium	"Pump Up the Jam"

== 1990s ==
Year	Artist	Origin	Song
1990	Snap!	Germany	"The Power"
1990	Snap!	Germany	"Ooops up"
1990	Snap!	Germany	"Mary Had a Little Boy"
1990	Technotronic	Belgium	"Get Up!"
1990	Technotronic	Belgium	"Rockin' Over the Beat"
1990	Army of Lovers	Sweden	"Ride the Bullet"
1991	Snap!	Germany	"Colour of Love"
1991	2 Unlimited	The Netherlands	"Get Ready for This"
1991	Army of Lovers	Sweden	"Crucified"
1991	Black Box	Italy	"Strike It Up"
1991	Rozalla	Zambia, Zimbabwe	"Everybody’s Free (To Feel Good)"
1992	2 Unlimited	The Netherlands	"Twilight Zone"
1992	2 Unlimited	The Netherlands	"Workaholic"
1992	2 Unlimited	The Netherlands	"The Magic Friend"
1992	Captain Hollywood Project	Germany	"More and More"
1992	Captain Hollywood Project	Germany	"Only With You"
1992	Technotronic	Belgium	"Move This"
1992	DJ BoBo	Switzerland	"Somebody Dance with Me"
1992	Double You	Italy	"Please Don't Go"
1992	Dr. Alban	Nigeria, Sweden	"It's My Life"
1992	Felix	United Kingdom	"Don't You Want Me"
1992	Snap!	Germany	"Rhythm Is a Dancer"
1993	DJ BoBo	Switzerland	"Keep on Dancing"
1993	DJ BoBo	Switzerland	"Take Control"
1993	Captain Hollywood Project	Germany	"Impossible"
1993	2 Unlimited	The Netherlands	"No Limit"
1993	2 Unlimited	The Netherlands	"Tribal Dance"
1993	2 Unlimited	The Netherlands	"Maximum Overdrive"
1993	E-Type	Sweden	"Set The World on Fire"
1993	Corona	Italy	"The Rhythm of the Night"
1993	Culture Beat	Germany	"Mr. Vain"
1993	Culture Beat	Germany	"Got to Get It"
1993	Culture Beat	Germany	"Anything"
1993	Jam & Spoon	Germany	"Right in the Night"
1993	Intermission	Germany	"Piece of My Heart"
1993	Pandora	Sweden	"Trust Me"
1993	Haddaway	Germany	"What Is Love"
1993	Haddaway	Germany	"Life"
1993	Magic Affair	Germany	"Omen III"
1993	Loft	Germany	"Summer Summer"
1993	Loft	Germany	"Hold On"
1993	Whigfield	Italy, Denmark	"Saturday Night"
1993	2 Brothers on the 4th Floor	The Netherlands	"Never Alone"
1993	Twenty 4 Seven	The Netherlands	"Slave to the Music"
1993	Electro Team	Croatia	"Tek je 12 Sati"
1993	Maxx	Germany	"Get-A-Way"
1994	Maxx	Germany	"No More (I Can't Stand It)"
1994	Maxx	Germany	"You Can Get It"
1994	Loft	Germany	"Love Is Magic"
1994	Playahitty	Italy	"The Summer is Magic"
1994	2 Unlimited	The Netherlands	"Let the Beat Control Your Body"
1994	2 Unlimited	The Netherlands	"The Real Thing"
1994	2 Unlimited	The Netherlands	"No One"
1994	DJ BoBo	Switzerland	"Let the Dream Come True"
1994	Doop	The Netherlands	"Doop"
1994	Dr. Alban	Sweden	"Look Who's Talking"
1994	Haddaway	Germany	"Rock My Heart"
1994	2 Brothers on the 4th Floor	The Netherlands	"Dreams (Will Come Alive)"
1994	Ice MC	Italy	"Think About the Way"
1994	Real McCoy	Germany	"Another Night"
1994	Real McCoy	Germany	"Automatic Lover (Call for Love)"
1994	Real McCoy	Germany	"Run Away"
1994	Rednex	Sweden	"Cotton Eye Joe"
1994	Scatman John	United States	"Scatman (Ski Ba Bop Ba Dop Bop)"
1994	La Bouche	Germany	"Sweet Dreams"
1995	La Bouche	Germany	"Be My Lover"
1995	Captain Jack	Germany	"Captain Jack"
1995	2 Unlimited	The Netherlands	"Here I Go"
1995	Ace of Base	Sweden	"Beautiful Life"
1995	Corona	Italy	"Baby baby"
1995	Corona	Italy	"Try Me Out"
1995	DJ BoBo	Switzerland	"Love is All Around"
1995	DJ BoBo	Switzerland	"There Is a Party"
1995	DJ BoBo	Switzerland	"Freedom"
1995	Dreamworld	Sweden	"Movin' Up"
1995	Haddaway	Germany	"Fly Away"
1995	Me & My	Denmark	"Dub-I-Dub"
1996	Alexia	Italy	"Summer Is Crazy"
1996	Alexia	Italy	"Number One"
1996	Gala	Italy	"Freed from Desire"
1996	Paradisio	Belgium	"Bailando"
1996	Amber	The Netherlands	"This Is Your Night"
1996	Gina G	Australia	"Ooh Aah... Just a Little Bit"
1996	Mr. President	Germany	"Coco Jamboo"
1997	Gala	Italy	"Let a Boy Cry"
1997	Aqua	Denmark, Norway	"Barbie Girl"
1997	Sash!	Germany	"Encore une fois"
1997	Sash!	Germany	"Stay"
1998	Alice Deejay	The Netherlands	"Better Off Alone"
1998	Bus Stop	United Kingdom	"Kung Fu Fighting"
1998	Daze	Denmark	"Together Forever (The Cyber Pet Song)"
1998	Loona	The Netherlands	"Bailando"
1998	Eiffel 65	Italy	"Blue (Da Ba Dee)"
1998	Love Inc.	Canada	"You're a Superstar"
1998	Vengaboys	The Netherlands	"Up and Down"
1998	Vengaboys	The Netherlands	"We Like to Party"
1998	Toy-Box	Denmark	Tarzan & Jane
1999	Vengaboys	The Netherlands	"Boom, Boom, Boom, Boom!!"
1999	Alice Deejay	The Netherlands	"Back in My Life"
1999	Amber	The Netherlands	"Sexual (Li Da Di)"
1999	Angel City featuring Lara McAllen	The Netherlands, United Kingdom	"Love Me Right (Oh Sheila)"

== 2000s ==
Year	Artist	Origin	Song
2000	ATC	Germany	"Around the World (La La La La La)"
2000	Fragma	Germany	"Toca's Miracle"
2000	French Affair	Germany, France	"My Heart Goes Boom (La Di Da Da)"
2001	DJ Encore featuring Engelina	Denmark	"I See Right Through to You"
2001	DJ Sammy and Yanou featuring Do	Spain, Germany, The Netherlands	"Heaven"
2002	Modern Talking	Germany	"Ready for the Victory"
2002	t.A.T.u.	Russia	"All the Things She Said"
2003	DJ BoBo	Switzerland	"Chihuahua"
2003	O-Zone	Moldova	"Dragostea din tei"
2004	Günther	Sweden	"Ding Dong Song"
2005	DHT	Belgium	"Listen to Your Heart"
2005	Crazy Frog	Sweden	"Popcorn"
2005	Dared	Belgium	"Driver's Seat"
2005	Cascada	Germany	"Everytime We Touch"
2006	Basshunter	Sweden	"Boten Anna"
2006	September	Sweden	"Cry for You"
2007	Basshunter	Sweden	"Now You're Gone"
2007	Cascada	Germany	"What Hurts the Most"
2007	Kate Ryan	Belgium	"Voyage, voyage"
2008	Eurobandið	Iceland	"This Is My Life"
2008	Inna	Romania	"Hot"
2008	Kate Ryan	Belgium	"Ella, elle l'a"
2008	Waldo's People	Finland	"Lose Control"
2009	Cascada	Germany	"Evacuate the Dancefloor"
2009	Edward Maya	Romania	"Stereo Love"

== 2010s ==
Year	Artist	Origin	Song
2010	Hera Björk	Iceland	"Je ne sais quoi"
2010	Rihanna	Barbados	"Only Girl (In the World)"
2010	SunStroke Project and Olia Tira	Moldova	"Run Away"
2011	Britney Spears	United States	"Till the World Ends"
2011	Kelly Rowland featuring the WAV.s	United States	"Down for Whatever"
2011	Eric Saade	Sweden	"Popular"
2011	Alexandra Stan	Romania	"Mr. Saxobeat"
2011	Pitbull featuring Marc Anthony	United States, Puerto Rico	"Rain Over Me"
2011	The Wanted	United Kingdom and Ireland	"Glad You Came"
2012	Loreen	Sweden	"Euphoria"
2012	Oceana	Germany	"Endless Summer"
2012	R.I.O. featuring Nicco	Germany, United States	"Party Shaker"
2012	Tacabro	Italy	"Tacata'"
2012	Usher	United States	"Scream"
2013	Justin Bieber featuring Ludacris	Canada, United States	"All Around the World"
2013	Cascada	Germany	"Glorious"
2013	Lady Gaga	United States	"Applause"
2013	Katy Perry	United States	"Walking on Air"
2018	Calvin Harris & Dua Lipa	United Kingdom	"One Kiss"
2018	Charli XCX & Troye Sivan	United Kingdom	"1999"

== 2020s ==
Year	Artist	Origin	Song
2023	Kyle Gordon feat. DJ Crazy Times & Ms. Biljana Electronica	United States	"Planet of the Bass"
2023	Alan Walker, Dash Berlin and Vikkstar	The Netherlands, Norway, United Kingdom	"Better Off (Alone, Pt. III)"
2024	Kaleen	Austria	"We Will Rave"
2025	BLACKPINK	South Korea	"JUMP"

== See also ==
- List of Eurodance artists
