= The Reason Is You =

Single by Nina

from the album Dare!
- B-side: "Save My Life"; Remixes
- Released: 1994
- Genre: Eurodance; house
- Length: 6:30 (extended radio edit); 6:10 (tranceformer extended radio edit); 7:15 (extended club mix); 7:50 (tranceformer extended club mix)
- Label: Blow Up
- Songwriter: Nosie Katzmann
- Producer: Nosie Katzmann

Nina singles chronology
"The Reason Is You" (1994)	"Until All Your Dreams Come True" (1995)

Music video
- "The Reason Is You" on YouTube

"The Reason Is You" is a song by German singer and actress Nina Gerhard. She used to sing on several singles by German Eurodance music project Captain Hollywood Project, like "More and More" and "Only with You", before she went solo in 1994 with her frontname 'Nina'. Written by Nosie Katzmann, "The Reason Is You" was released in 1994 as the first single from her debut album, Dare! (1995). It peaked at number two in both Belgium and Spain, and was a top-20 hit in Denmark and Iceland. Due to the popularity of the song in Spain and Belgium, it was re-released in May 1995. It was also released with Spanish vocals. Two different music videos were produced for the song; one of them was filmed in Venice, Italy. German photographer and filmmaker Ralf Schmerberg photographed the photo used on the cover of the single. In 1997, Samantha Fox made a cover version of the song.

== Chart performance ==
The single enjoyed some success in Europe, peaking at number-two in Belgium. In Denmark, it became a top-20 hit, peaking at number 20 in January 1995. In Iceland, it was even more successful, peaking at number 16 in February. On the Eurochart Hot 100, "The Reason Is You" reached its highest position as number 83. It did not chart in the UK.

In Spain, the song reached its second highest chart position in Europe, as number two. It entered the Spanish singles chart at number eight, and the following weeks it climbed to number four, three, and four again, before peaking at number two. Then it dropped to number five, seven, and nine, before leaving the chart. Some weeks later it re-appeared at number 18 and also at number 19, with some weeks in between. It was held off reaching number-one by Ororo's cover version of "Zombie" by The Cranberries.

== Track listing ==
- CD maxi, Germany
1. "The Reason Is You" (Radio Version) — 4:00
2. "The Reason Is You" (Tranceformer Extended Mix) — 6:10
3. "The Reason Is You" (House Mix) — 5:15
4. "The Reason Is You" (Extended Radio Edit) — 6:30
5. "Save My Life" — 3:15
- CD maxi, Europe
1. "The Reason Is You" (Tranceformer Radio Mix) — 3:35
2. "The Reason Is You" (Spanish Version) — 4:10
3. "The Reason Is You" (Tranceformer Extended Mix) — 6:10
4. "The Reason Is You" (Alex' Mix) — 6:20
5. "The Reason Is You" (Extended Radio Edit) — 6:30

== Charts ==
=== Weekly charts ===
Chart (1994)	Peak position
Belgium (Ultratop 50 Flanders)	2
Denmark (IFPI)	20
Europe (Eurochart Hot 100)	83
Iceland (Íslenski Listinn Topp 40)	16
Spain (AFYVE)	2

=== Year-end charts ===
Chart (1994)	Position
Belgium (Ultratop Flanders)	54
