= Nosie Katzmann =

German dance music songwriter and producer

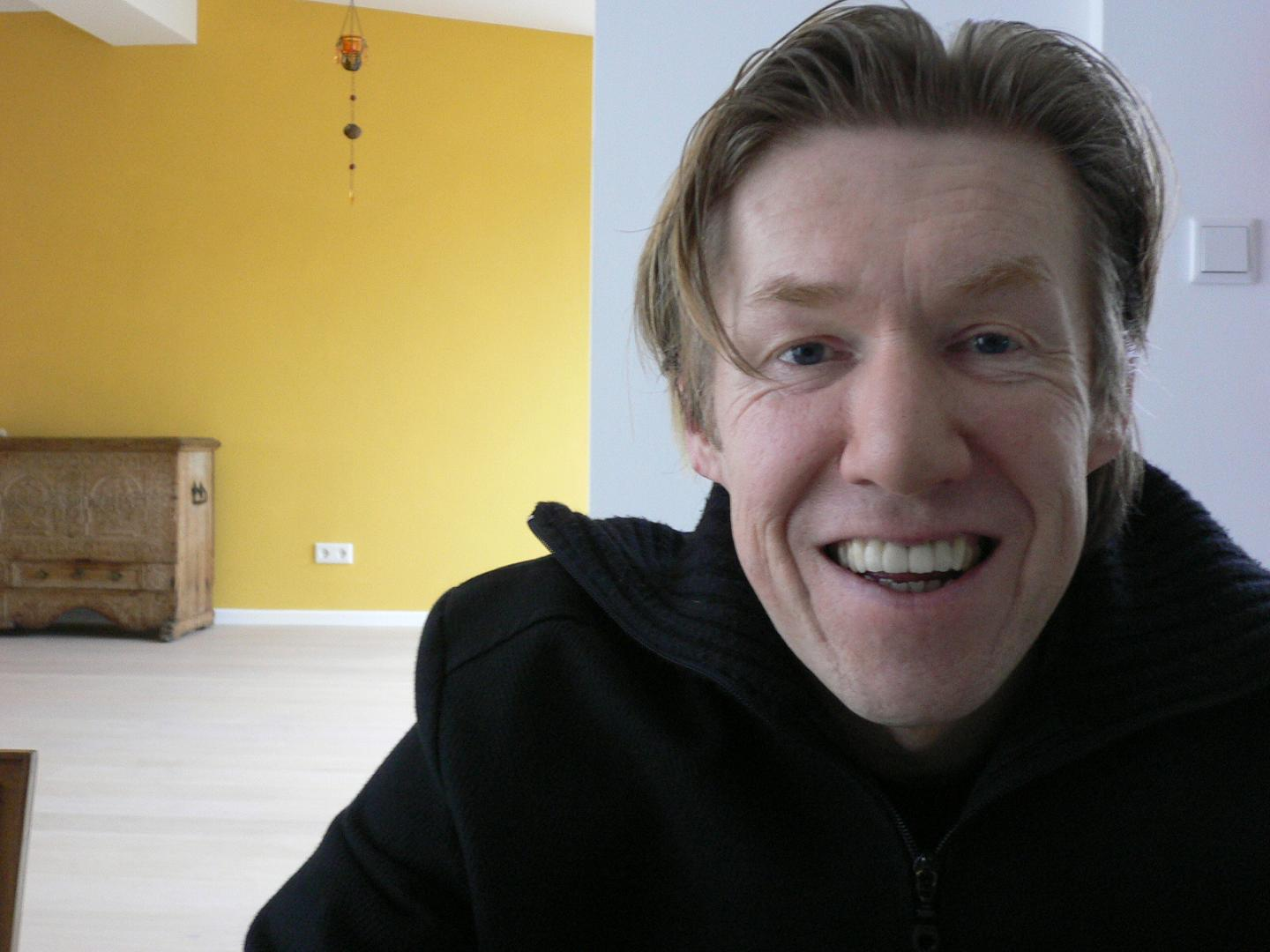
- Born: Jürgen Katzmann; January 19, 1959 (age 67); Bad Neustadt at den Saale, Germany
- Other name: Morrison Long
- Occupations: Songwriter, producer
- Known for: Music Production, Eurodance
- Website: http://www.katzmann.de/

Jürgen Katzmann aka Nosie Katzmann and Morrison Long (born 19 January 1959 in Bad Neustadt at der Saale) is a German dance music songwriter and producer.

He is known for writing songs for several European electronic dance acts like Culture Beat and Captain Hollywood Project, for whom he contributed various chart hits, among them "Mr. Vain", "More and More" and others. "More and More" was his first No. 1 in Germany. In 1993, "Mr. Vain" became his biggest hit so far, topping the charts in Germany, Austria, Switzerland and the UK.

Katzmann first started playing semi-professionally from 1979 and he was influenced by a wide variety of genres from Country to Punk. He started working with producers Thorsten Fenslau und Jens Zimmermann from 1989 with whom he wrote several Eurodance hits such as Mr Vain.

Katzmann founded his own record label GIM Records in 2008 to develop lesser-known artists.

== Discography ==
=== Solo ===
- Greatest Hits 1 (2008)
- Greatest Hits 2 (2010)
- Katzmann (2014)

=== Writing / production credits ===
1980s

- "Listen What Your Girlfriend Says" – Balloons
- "Don’t Talk Too Much to Strangers" – Balloons
- "Wir wollen tanzen" – Peter Gleichauf
- "1000 Küsse" – Peter Gleichauf
- "Change / Shake It" – Pirates of Pop
- "Alone (It’s Me)" – Abfahrt
- "Der Erdbeermund" – Culture Beat

1990s

- "I Like You" – Culture Beat
- "Running" – Tyrell Corp.
- "Tell Me That You Wait" – Culture Beat
- "No Deeper Meaning" – Culture Beat
- "Good Friend" – Paris Red
- "Dancin’ Alone" – Daniel Gomez
- "Two Lonely Hearts" – Tears Before Sadness
- "Lobe Says Don’t" – Hank in Lolas Drugstore
- "Breakdown" – Voyage Sur Vinyl
- "Come into My Life" – Abfahrt
- "River" – Public Art
- "The Black" – ABS
- "More and More" – Captain Hollywood Project
- "Temporary Thing" – Voyage Sur Vinyl
- "Honesty" – Intermission
- "Piece of My Heart" – Intermission
- "Only with You" – Captain Hollywood Project
- "All I Want" – Captain Hollywood Project
- "Impossible" – Captain Hollywood Project
- "Mr. Vain" – Culture Beat
- "Got to Get It" – Culture Beat
- "Anything" – Culture Beat
- "Summer Summer" – Loft
- "Hold On" – Loft
- "Right in the Night" – Jam & Spoon
- "Touch" – Ray Dante
- "Hold On" – Leon
- "Heaven (My Mind Is a Playground)" – Tully Hoo
- "Next Time (I Promise)" – Flame
- "Show Me" – Kim Sanders
- "Tell Me That You Want Me" – Kim Sanders
- "World in Your Hands" – Culture Beat
- "The Colour of My Dreams" – B.G., the Prince of Rap
- "Find Me (Odyssey to Anyoona)" – Jam & Spoon
- "The Reason Is You" – Nina
- "Love Is All Around" – DJ BoBo
- "Nani Nani" – Kima
- "Party of One" – Natascha Wright
- "Sell Me Your Secrets" – Vanilla
- "Wake the World" – Loft
- "Rock a Bit" – B.G., the Prince of Rap
- "Ride" – Kim Sanders
- "The Same Thing To You" - Sarah Brightman
- "You Better Run" – Dark A.T.8
- "How Can I" – Men Behind*Nimm’N – Clubfish
- "Luck" – Sin Club
- "Lovely Lie" – Natascha Wright
- "Machine Gun" – Party Nation
- "I Didn’t Know What to Expect" – Microbots
- "Angel (Ladadi O-Heyo)" – Jam & Spoon
- "The Way Love Is" – Captain Hollywood Project
- "Inside Out" – Culture Beat
- "Little Jesus" – Skywalker
- "Say You Think of Me" – Natascha Wright
- "Until All Your Dreams Come True" – Nina
- "Out of My Head" – Steven Levis Project
- "Free Me" – Loft
- "Honey" – Mike Diehl
- "Try a Little Harder" – Indian Fire
- "Love Is the Price" – DJ BoBo
- "Break It Up" – Scooter
- "Late Night Letter" – Affinity 3
- "Was guckt’n die" – Clubfish
- "In Her Shoes" – Nina
- "Jealousy" – Kim Sanders
- "Haus der drei Sonnen" – Randell
- "I Feel It" – Coke Head
- "Take My Hand" – Affinity 3
- "Man on the Moon (El hombre en la luna)" – Raquel
- "Call Me" – Le Click
- "Who Wants to Be Your Lover" – Jimmy James
- "Rhythm of Love" – Linda M.
- "The Reason Is You (One on One)" – Samantha Fox
- "Dance the Night Away" – Pyromaniacs
- "Leave in Silence" – Scooter
- "Heaven’s Got to Be Better" – Le Click
- "It Drums" – Morrison Long
- "Don’t Call It Love" – Jam & Spoon
- "Zum Lachen in den Keller gehen" – Tobsucht
- "Your Crown" – Infernal
- "Hypothetic" – Judy Weiss

2000s

- "Burning Flame" – Krystal
- "Be. Angeled" – Jam & Spoon
- "Danger Sign" – Captain Hollywood
- "Beautiful Child" – Madelyne
- "Bite" – Phonekiller
- "Food for Thought" – Kim Sanders
- "Talk with God" – Nathalie Makoma
- "On Faith" – Nathalie Makoma
- "Cynical Heart" – Jam & Spoon
- "Butterfly Sign" – Jam & Spoon
- "Mary Jane" – Jam & Spoon
- "Cosmic Angel" – Phonekiller
