= All I Want (Captain Hollywood Project song) =

Single by Captain Hollywood Project

from the album Love Is Not Sex
- Released: 18 May 1993
- Recorded: 1992
- Genre: Eurodance; R&B; trance
- Length: 3:52
- Label: Blow Up; Intercord
- Songwriters: Giora Schein; Nosie Katzmann; Tony Dawson-Harrison; Attack II
- Producer: Cyborg

Captain Hollywood Project singles chronology
"Only with You" (1993)	"All I Want" (1993)	"Impossible" (1993)

Music video
- "All I Want" on YouTube

"All I Want" is a song recorded by the German musician known under the pseudonym of Captain Hollywood Project, released in May 1993, by labels Blow Up and Intercord, as the third single from his debut album, Love Is Not Sex (1993). The song features vocals by Kim Sanders and was co-written by Nosie Katzmann and Tony Dawson-Harrison (a.k.a. Captain Hollywood). It was a hit in several countries, but achieved a minor success in comparison with the project's two previous singles, "More and More" and "Only with You". "All I Want" peaked at number two in Portugal and on the RPM Dance/Urban chart in Canada, and number 22 on the Eurochart Hot 100. The accompanying music video was directed by Walter Knofel and filmed in Austria and France.

== Critical reception ==
Larry Flick from Billboard magazine wrote that the act that had scored big with "More & More" "offers an equally sparkling gem from its noteworthy Love Is Not Sex set. Track travels down a slower, more R&B-flavored path, matching deep-voiced male rapping with sultry female belting at the chorus." Wendi Cermak from The Network Forty described it as "yet another pop-influenced trance/ambient [...] number from Captain Hollywood. The vocals are very catchy and fit nicely over the hypnotic synth lines." Charles Aaron from Spin complimented the Eddie "Flashin'" Fowlke's "Club Dub" as "state-of-the-art progressive house—almost subliminal organ, stringent percussion whacks, melody via synth hunt-and-peck, lyrics stripped to a simple mantra. Room to breathe or sweat it out. The female vocals are either determined or resigned---I can't decide—which gives the groove its cryptic allure."

== Chart performance ==
"All I Want" was a hit in several European countries and North America, although it didn't reach the same level of success as the project's two first singles, "More and More" and "Only with You. It peaked at number two in Portugal in July 1993, as one of its best chart position, being held off the top spot by Dire Strait's Encores. Additionally, the single entered the top 10 in Greece (10), the top 30 in Austria (25), Germany (22) and the Netherlands (28), and was a top-40 hit in Belgium (Flanders) (32) and France (31). It didn't chart on the UK Singles Chart, but peaked at number 51 on the Music Week Dance Singles chart. "All I Want" debuted on the Eurochart Hot 100 at number 88 on 26 June 1993, after charting in Austria, Belgium and Germany. It peaked on the chart four weeks later, at number 22, while reaching number eleven on the European Dance Radio Chart. Outside Europe, the single reached number two on the RPM Dance/Urban chart in Canada.

== Music video ==
The music video for "All I Want" was directed by Walter Knofel and filmed in Paris, France and Vienna, Austria. Hannes Drapal was behind the camera. In the video, Captain Hollywood chases a blonde female model in Paris. It features scenes in front of the Eiffel Tower. The video was later made available by Altra Moda Music on YouTube in 2017. Knofel had previously directed the video for Captain Hollywood's hit single "Only with You".

== Track listings ==
- CD maxi 1 (May 1993)
1. "All I Want" (Single Video Mix) – 3:43
2. "All I Want" (Positive Vibe Mix) – 6:13
3. "All I Want" (Sunday Mornin' Mix) – 7:41
4. "All I Want" (Naked Eye Mix) – 4:42
- CD maxi 2 (June 1993)
1. "All I Want" (What The Underground Wants Mix) – 7:45
2. "All I Want" (Norway Remix) – 7:37
3. "All I Want" (JJ Dance Mix) – 7:14

== Charts ==
=== Weekly charts ===
Chart (1993)	Peak position
Austria (Ö3 Austria Top 40)	25
Belgium (Ultratop 50 Flanders)	32
Belgium (VRT Top 30 Flanders)	21
Canada Dance/Urban (RPM)	2
Europe (Eurochart Hot 100)	22
Europe (European Dance Radio)	11
France (SNEP)	31
Germany (GfK)	22
Greece (Pop + Rock)	10
Netherlands (Dutch Top 40)	32
Netherlands (Single Top 100)	28
Portugal (AFP)	2
Switzerland (Schweizer Hitparade)	30
UK Dance (Music Week)	51
US Hot Dance Club Play (Billboard)	7
US Maxi-Singles Sales (Billboard)	17

=== Year-end charts ===
Chart (1994)	Position
Canada Dance/Urban (RPM)	24
