= Boom Boxx (musical group) =

European Eurohouse/Italodance project

- Genres: Eurohouse, Italodance
- Years active: 2003–
- Labels: Ministry Of Sound, Coconut
- Members: Alex Belcher; Criss Tonino; Pietro Mattina; Jesse Lohrer; Max Özuzun; Eazo Barbato

Boom Boxx is a European Eurohouse/Italodance project formed in 2003. He was known for his single "Balla Da Li", which held leading positions in charts around the world.

The band consisted of DJs and music producers from all over the world. It included Alex Belcher, Criss Tonino, Pietro Mattina, Jesse Lohrer, Max Özuzun and Eazo Barbato.

In 2003, together with the Captain Hollywood Project, Boom Boxx released an album with a remake of the 1994 single "Flying High" and its remixes. It reached the 44th position in the German charts. "Flying High" was followed by the singles "Boom:Boom:Boom" in 2003 and "You are a Superstar" (with Captain Hollywood) in 2004. In 2004, the project began collaborating with Linda O., releasing the single "Balla Da Li", which became a club hit and occupied leading positions in the charts of Finland and Denmark. In Germany, the single reached the 38th position. Later releases were the singles "Pokito (Me Me Ma Me Mo)" (with Linda O.) and "Hey Oh Cappuccino" in 2005.

== Discography ==
Charts
Song	Country	Date	Position
Flying High	Germany	19.09.2003	44 (2 week)
Balla Da Li	Germany	18.10.2004	38 (4 week)
Balla Da Li	Denmark	13.05.2005	12 (6 week)
Balla Da Li	Finland	03.02.2005	11 (2 week)

- 2003: Flying High (feat. Captain Hollywood)
- 2003: Boom:Boom:Boom
- 2004: You are a Superstar (feat. Captain Hollywood)
- 2004: Balla Da Li (with Linda O.)
- 2005: Pokito (Me Me Ma Me Mo) (with Linda O.)
- 2005: Hey Oh Cappuccino
