= Find Another Way =

1995 single by Captain Hollywood Project

Single by Captain Hollywood Project

from the album Animals or Human
- B-side: "Odyssey of Emotions"
- Released: 20 March 1995
- Genre: Eurodance
- Length: 3:57
- Label: Blow Up; Intercord
- Songwriters: Attack II; Tony Dawson-Harrison; Tom Jacques G. Coin; Thorsten Adler; Jörg Wagner DJ
- Producer: DMP

Captain Hollywood Project singles chronology
"Flying High" (1994)	"Find Another Way" (1995)	"The Way Love Is" (1995)

Music video
- "Find Another Way" on YouTube

"Find Another Way" is a song co-written and recorded by German musician Captain Hollywood Project, released in March 1995, by labels Blow Up and Intercord, as the second single from his second album, Animals or Human (1995). It was a hit in several countries, peaking at number four in Finland and number 22 in Germany.

== Critical reception ==
Juha Soininen wrote in his 2020 book, Move Your Body (2 The 90s): Unlimited Eurodance, that "Find Another Way" "was weirdy perky and a little bit annoying, so it didn't fit to his more somber style". James Hamilton from British magazine Music Week's RM Dance Update described it as a "catchy 'oh oh oh oh' girl warbled and 'pompin' pompin'' guy rapped ridiculously frantic 158.8bpm fierce cheesy Euro flier".

== Chart performance ==
"Find Another Way" was a top-10 hit in Finland, peaking at number four. In Germany, the single reached number 22, spending 14 weeks inside the German Singles Chart between 17 April and 17 July 1995. Additionally, it was a top-20 hit in Austria (19), Denmark (14) and Sweden (14), and a top-30 hit in Switzerland (25). In the UK, "Find Another Way" charted on the UK Singles Chart, reaching number 93 during its first week on the chart, on 2 July. It was the last song by Captain Hollywood Project to chart there.

== Music video ==
The accompanying music video for "Find Another Way" was directed by Silver Haze of German design agency I-D Büro in Stuttgart, Germany. The computer generated video depicts Captain Hollywood in his spaceship, flying through narrow streets between tall skyscrapers in a futuristic city setting. In between, male and female robots appears in or outside of the buildings. The video was B-listed on German music television channel VIVA in May 1995, and later same month, MTV Europe put it on prime break out rotation.

== Track listings ==
- CD maxi
1. "Find Another Way" (single mix) (3:57)
2. "Find Another Way" (extended mix) (6:09)
3. "Odyssey of Emotions" (6:06)

== Charts ==
Chart (1995)	Peak position
Austria (Ö3 Austria Top 40)	19
Belgium (Ultratop 50 Flanders)	37
Denmark (IFPI)	14
Europe (Eurochart Hot 100)	38
Finland (Suomen virallinen lista)	4
Germany (GfK)	22
Netherlands (Dutch Top 40)	31
Netherlands (Single Top 100)	40
Sweden (Sverigetopplistan)	14
Switzerland (Schweizer Hitparade)	25
UK Singles (OCC)	93
UK Pop Tip Club Chart (Music Week)	23

== Release history ==
Region	Date	Format(s)	Label(s)	Ref.
Germany	20 March 1995	CD	Blow Up; Intercord	
United Kingdom	19 June 1995	12-inch vinyl; CD; cassette	Pulse-8	
