= Love Is Not Sex =

Studio album by Captain Hollywood Project
- Released: March 8, 1993
- Recorded: 1992–1993
- Length: 62:27
- Label: Blow Up INT 879.000
- Producer: Captain Hollywood Project

Captain Hollywood Project chronology
Love Is Not Sex (1993)	Animals or Human (1995)

Love Is Not Sex is the debut album of American-born musician Tony Dawson-Harrison, AKA "Captain Hollywood". Dawson-Harrison was exposed to eurodance music during his military service in 80's West Germany. It was released on March 8, 1993.

The album peaked at No. 9 on the German Albums Chart and has sold around nearly 7 million copies worldwide as of 2018.

== Track listing ==
No.	Title	Length
1.	"More and More" (single version)	3:55
2.	"All I Want"	5:19
3.	"It's Raining"	4:11
4.	"Impossible"	5:06
5.	"Only with You" (video mix)	3:48
6.	"Rhythm of Life"	5:00
7.	"Love 4 U Love 4 Me"	4:35
8.	"Rhythm Takes Control"	4:35
9.	"Nothing's Gonna Stop Me"	5:01
10.	"Only with You" (Magic remix)	6:04
11.	"More and More" (Underground mix; additional production and remix for MCT)	5:56
12.	"Only with You" (Faze 2 edit)	7:18

== Charts ==
Chart (1993)	Peak position
Austrian Albums (Ö3 Austria)	15
Canadian Albums (CAN)	60
Dutch Albums (Album Top 100)	33
European Albums (European Hot 100)	21
Finnish Albums (Suomen virallinen lista)	6
German Albums (Offizielle Top 100)	9
Hungarian Albums (MAHASZ)	28
Swedish Albums (Sverigetopplistan)	16
Swiss Albums (Schweizer Hitparade)	9

== Production ==
- Design [Cover] – Design Hoch Drei
- Guitar – DiKo Kociemba
- Management – Susanne Foecker
- Other [Hair] – Joe Barber
- Photography – Esser & Strauß
- Producer, Recorded By, Mastered By – Cyborg, DMP GmbH
- Recorded at DMP Studios
- Publishing – Edition "DMP" / "Get Into Magic" / ICM / Warner Chappell
- Marketing – Intercord Ton GmbH, Licensee
