= Fly (Through the Starry Night) =

Single by 2 Brothers on the 4th Floor featuring D-Rock and Des'Ray

from the album 2
- Released: March 1995
- Studio: Dancability Studio
- Genre: Eurodance; techno
- Length: 3:26
- Label: Lowland Records; CNR Music
- Songwriters: Bobby Boer; Dancability; D-Rock
- Producer: 2 Brothers on the 4th Floor

2 Brothers on the 4th Floor featuring D-Rock and Des'Ray singles chronology
"Let Me Be Free" (1994)	"Fly (Through the Starry Night)" (1995)	"Come Take My Hand" (1996)

Music video
- "Fly (Through the Starry Night)" on YouTube

"Fly (Through the Starry Night)" is a song by Dutch Eurodance group 2 Brothers on the 4th Floor featuring rapper D-Rock and singer Des'Ray. It was released in March 1995 by Lowland Records and CNR Music as the first single from the group's second album, 2 (1996). In Europe, the song peaked at number six in the Netherlands and became a top-20 hit in Belgium. On the Eurochart Hot 100, it peaked at number 70, while reaching number 21 on the European Dance Radio Chart. Outside Europe, it was a number-one hit in Israel for two weeks. In 2014, "Fly (Through the Starry Night)" was released in the Netherlands in a new remix by Jaz Von D (a.k.a. Jasper Kuijper).

== Track listing ==
- CD single, Netherlands (1995)
1. "Fly (Through the Starry Night)" (Radio Version) — 3:21
2. "Fly (Through the Starry Night)" (Lick Mix) — 6:48
- CD maxi, Netherlands (1995)
1. "Fly (Through the Starry Night)" (Radio Version) — 3:26
2. "Fly (Through the Starry Night)" (Lick Mix) — 6:48
3. "Fly (Through the Starry Night)" (Beats 'R' Us Mix) — 3:12
4. "Fly (Through the Starry Night)" (Extended Version) — 5:06
- CD maxi (The Remixes), Netherlands (1995)
1. "Fly (Through the Starry Night)" (C.C.Q.T. Radio Edit) — 3:50
2. "Fly (Through the Starry Night)" (C.C.Q.T. Extended Mix) — 6:15
3. "Fly (Through the Starry Night)" (Mars Plastic Mix) — 6:20
4. "Fly (Through the Starry Night)" (Happy Hardcore Mix) — 4:35

== Charts ==
=== Weekly charts ===
Chart (1995)	Peak position
Austria (Ö3 Austria Top 40)	26
Belgium (Ultratop 50 Flanders)	19
Belgium (Ultratop 50 Wallonia)	30
Europe (Eurochart Hot 100)	70
Europe (European Dance Radio)	21
Israel (Israeli Singles Chart)	1
Italy (Musica e dischi)	12
Netherlands (Dutch Top 40)	7
Netherlands (Single Top 100)	6
Sweden (Sverigetopplistan)	24

=== Year-end charts ===
Chart (1995)	Position
Netherlands (Dutch Top 40)	62
Netherlands (Single Top 100)	56
