= Fairytales (2 Brothers on the 4th Floor song) =

Single by 2 Brothers on the 4th Floor featuring D-Rock and Des'Ray

from the album 2
- Released: February 1996
- Genre: Eurodance; happy hardcore
- Length: 3:29
- Label: Lowland Records; CNR Music
- Songwriters: Bobby Boer; Dancability; D-Rock
- Producer: 2 Brothers on the 4th Floor

2 Brothers on the 4th Floor featuring D-Rock and Des'Ray singles chronology
"Come Take My Hand" (1995)	"Fairytales" (1996)	"Mirror of Love" (1996)

Music video
- "Fairytales" on YouTube

"Fairytales" is a song by Dutch Eurodance group 2 Brothers on the 4th Floor featuring rapper D-Rock and singer Des'Ray. It was released in February 1996 by Lowland Records and CNR Music as the third single from the group's second album, 2 (1996). In their native Netherlands, the song peaked at number four, while entering the top 50 in Belgium and Sweden. On the Eurochart Hot 100, "Fairytales" peaked at number 85 in March 1996. Outside Europe, it was a number-one hit for one week in Israel. A computer generated music video was produced to promote the single, directed by Ben Liebrand.

== Critical reception ==
Upon the release, pan-European magazine Music & Media wrote, "Another possible smash hit from D-Rock and Des'Ray, backed by the Boer brothers. Radio-friendly dance from the Lowlands with a whiff of hardcore. The fast beats and spacey keyboards provide the backbone for the raps and vocals."

== Track listing ==
- 12", Netherlands (1996)
1. "Fairytales" (Extended Version) — 4:37
2. "Fairytales" (No Velocity Happy Hardcore Edit) — 3:30
3. "Fairytales" (Radio Version) — 3:29
4. "Fairytales" (Charly Lownoise & Mental Theo Hardcore Mix) — 4:36
5. "Fairytales" (DJ Weirdo & DJ Sim 1,2,3,4 Happy Remix) — 5:53
6. "Fairytales" (Charly Lownoise & Mental Theo Rave Edit) — 4:05
- CD single, Netherlands (1996)
1. "Fairytales" (Radio Version) — 3:29
2. "Fairytales" (Charly Lownoise & Mental Theo Rave Edit) — 4:05
- CD maxi, Netherlands (1996)
1. "Fairytales" (Radio Version) — 3:29
2. "Fairytales" (Charly Lownoise & Mental Theo Rave Edit) — 4:05
3. "Fairytales" (No Velocity Happy Hardcore Edit) — 3:30
4. "Fairytales" (Extended Version) — 4:37
5. "Fairytales" (Charly Lownoise & Mental Theo Hardcore Mix) — 4:36
6. "Fairytales" (DJ Weirdo & DJ Sim 1,2,3,4 Happy Remix) — 5:53

== Charts ==
=== Weekly charts ===
Chart (1996)	Peak position
Belgium (Ultratop Flanders)	46
Europe (Eurochart Hot 100)	85
Israel (Israeli Singles Chart)	1
Netherlands (Dutch Top 40)	6
Netherlands (Single Top 100)	4
Sweden (Sverigetopplistan)	49

=== Year-end charts ===
Chart (1996)	Position
Netherlands (Dutch Top 40)	68
Netherlands (Single Top 100)	85
