= Piece of My Heart (Intermission song) =

Single by Intermission
- Released: August 1993
- Studio: DMP Studios
- Genre: Eurodance; house
- Length: 4:05
- Label: Blow Up; Intercord
- Songwriters: Nosie Katzmann; Tony Dawson-Harrison
- Producer: Cyborg DMP GmbH

Intermission singles chronology
"Honesty" (1993)	"Piece of My Heart" (1993)	"Six Days" (1994)

Music video
- "Piece of My Heart" on YouTube

"Piece of My Heart" is a song by German Eurodance project Intermission. Written by Nosie Katzmann and Tony Dawson-Harrison from Captain Hollywood Project, it was released in August 1993 by Blow Up and Intercord as the second single from the album by same name (1994). It features vocals by American singer Valerie Scott and uses the interpolated melody of the 1983 song "Send Me An Angel" by Australian band Real Life. The single was a top-10 hit in Austria, Germany and Spain. It spent 12 weeks on the German Singles Chart. The accompanying music video was directed by Basil Schlegel and Claudio Malasomma, and produced by Torpedo Filmproductions. In 2003, trance music duo Grey & Frost updated "Piece of My Heart" into a modern hard trance sound.

== Chart performance ==
"Piece of My Heart" was a major hit in several European countries, entering the top-10 in Austria (9), Germany (8), and Spain (7). It spent two weeks as number eight and 12 weeks within the German Singles Chart. Additionally, it reached numbers 40 and 42 in Switzerland and Belgium. The song debuted on the Eurochart Hot 100 at number 78 on 30 October 1993, after charting in Austria and Germany. It peaked at number 33 in January 1994. Outside Europe, "Piece of My Heart" was a top-20 hit in Israel, peaking at number eleven in September 1993, as well as reaching number 188 in Australia.

== Track listing ==
- CD single, France (1993)
1. "Piece of My Heart" (single mix) – 4:05
2. "Piece of My Heart" (piece mix)
- CD single (Remixes), Europe (1993)
1. "Piece of My Heart" (single mix) – 4:05
2. "Piece of My Heart" (heart mix) – 6:38
- CD maxi, Germany (1993)
1. "Piece of My Heart" (piece mix) – 6:46
2. "Piece of My Heart" (heart mix) – 6:38
3. "Piece of My Heart" (single mix) – 4:05
- CD maxi (Remixes), Germany (1993)
1. "Piece of My Heart" (T.K. remix) – 5:46
2. "Piece of My Heart" (The Legacy Of Sound remix) – 6:34
3. "Piece of My Heart" (Underground remix) – 8:28

== Charts ==
=== Weekly charts ===
Chart (1993–94)	Peak position
Australia (ARIA)	188
Austria (Ö3 Austria Top 40)	9
Belgium (Ultratop 50 Flanders)	42
Europe (Eurochart Hot 100)	33
Germany (GfK)	8
Israel (Israeli Singles Chart)	11
Netherlands (Dutch Top 40 Tipparade)	16
Spain (AFYVE)	7
Switzerland (Schweizer Hitparade)	40

=== Year-end charts ===
Chart (1993)	Position
Germany (GfK)	73
