= Hold On (Loft song) =

Single by Loft

from the album Wake the World
- B-side: "Remix"
- Released: November 1993
- Studio: DMP Studios
- Genre: Eurodance; house
- Length: 3:43
- Label: RCA
- Songwriters: Courtney Williams; Nosie Katzmann; Richard Williams
- Producer: Cyborg DMP GmbH

Loft singles chronology
"Summer Summer" (1993)	"Hold On" (1993)	"Love is Magic" (1994)

Music video
- "Hold On" on YouTube

"Hold On" is a song recorded by German group Loft, released in November 1993 by RCA Records as the second single from their first album, Wake the World (1994). Written by Courtney Williams, Nosie Katzmann and Richard Williams, the song features vocals by American singer Kim Sanders. Becoming one of the group's most successful singles, it reached number two on the Canadian RPM Dance/Urban chart and was a top-10 hit also in Israel, while entering the top 20 in Denmark and Finland. Additionally, it was a top-30 hit in Austria, Germany and Switzerland. On the Eurochart Hot 100, "Hold On" peaked at number 54 in January 1994. The accompanying music video was directed by Barry Maguire, and made mostly in black-and-white, but some scenes also have a sepia tone. German group Fun Factory used the same melody for their hit single "Close To You" in 1994.

== Critical reception ==
Pan-European magazine Music & Media wrote, "Coming after Loft's last hit 'Summer Summer', this dance troupe is more than likely to match the last single's success. 'Hold On''s up-beat tune is somewhat similar to Captain Hollywood's recent chartbusters but with a different vocal flavour. That isn't all that surprising with the Captain's producer taking his place behind the board."

== Track listing ==
- 12" single, Germany (1993)
1. "Hold On" (Respect Maximum Mix) — 5:20
2. "Hold On" (Radio Edit) — 3:37
3. "Hold On" (Atmospheric Mix) — 6:38
- 12" single (remix), Germany (1994)
1. "Hold On" (3-Nuts Remix) — 6:14
2. "Hold On" (TNT-Remix) — 5:49
3. "Hold On" (Radio Edit) — 3:37
- CD maxi, Germany (1993)
1. "Hold On" (Radio Edit) — 3:43
2. "Hold On" (Respect Maximum Mix) — 5:25
3. "Hold On" (Atmospheric Mix) — 6:35
- CD maxi (remix), Germany (1994)
1. "Hold On" (Radio Edit) — 3:37
2. "Hold On" (3-Nuts Remix) — 6:14
3. "Hold On" (TNT-Remix) — 5:49

== Charts ==
=== Weekly charts ===
Chart (1993–94)	Peak position
Austria (Ö3 Austria Top 40)	26
Canada Dance/Urban (RPM)	2
Denmark (IFPI)	13
Europe (Eurochart Hot 100)	54
Finland (Suomen virallinen lista)	19
Germany (GfK)	21
Israel (Israeli Singles Chart)	8
Switzerland (Schweizer Hitparade)	30

=== Year-end charts ===
Chart (1994)	Position
Canada Dance/Urban (RPM)	22
Germany (GfK)	79
