= The Way Love Is =

Single by Captain Hollywood Project

from the album Animals or Human
- Released: 1995
- Recorded: 1995
- Genre: Eurodance
- Length: 3:58
- Label: Intercord; Blow Up
- Songwriters: Attack II; Nosie Katzmann; Thorsten Adler; Tom Jacques G. Coin
- Producer: DMP

Captain Hollywood Project singles chronology
"Find Another Way" (1995)	"The Way Love Is" (1995)	"Over & Over" (1996)

Music video
- "The Way Love Is" on YouTube

"The Way Love Is" is a song recorded by a German musician known under the pseudonym of Captain Hollywood Project. It was released in 1995 by labels Intercord and Blow Up as the third and last single from his second album, Animals or Human (1995). The song features uncredited female vocals by singer Lori Glori and was a modest hit in Germany, where it peaked at number 71. It was co-written by Nosie Katzmann and the accompanying music video was directed by Rainer Thieding. He had previously directed the video for "Flying High".

== Track listing ==
- 12", Europe (1995)
1. "The Way Love Is" (Extended Mix) — 6:04
2. "The Way Love Is" (Norman Mix) — 6:11
3. "The Way Love Is" (Alternative Mix) — 5:49
- 12" (Remixes), Europe (1995)
1. "The Way Love Is" (Logo's Dance Hall Remix) — 6:07
2. "The Way Love Is" (House Remix) — 5:23
3. "The Way Love Is" (Acid Sax In A House Mix) — 7:13
4. "The Way Love Is" (T-Boom-Shaka-Lak-Mix) — 5:32
- CD single, Scandinavia (1995)
1. "The Way Love Is" (Ragga Single Mix) — 3:58
2. "The Way Love Is" (Alternative Mix) — 5:51
- CD maxi, Europe (1995)
1. "The Way Love Is" (Ragga Single Mix) — 3:58
2. "The Way Love Is" (Extended Mix) — 6:05
3. "The Way Love Is" (Norman Mix) — 6:12
4. "The Way Love Is" (Alternative Mix) — 5:51

== Charts ==
Chart (1995)	Peak position
Germany (Media Control Charts)	71
