= The Afterparty (Captain Hollywood Project album) =

Studio album by Captain Hollywood Project
- Released: 18 November 1996
- Genre: Eurodance, hip house
- Label: Mighty 533 092-2
- Producer: Alex Reginald Belcher, Tony Dawson-Harrison

Captain Hollywood Project chronology
Animals or Human (1995)	The Afterparty (1996)

The Afterparty is the third and final album by Eurodance group Captain Hollywood Project, released on 18 November 1996 by Mighty. This album was recorded under the name "Captain Hollywood". The record includes three singles: "Over & Over", "Love and Pain", and "The Afterparty". "Over and Over" was a hit in Europe, peaking at No. 35 in Austria and No. 45 in Germany.

== Track listing ==
1. "Intro" – 1:32
2. "Far Away" – 4:59
3. "Over & Over" – 3:43
4. "A Little Bit" – 4:21
5. "Waiting So Long" – 4:13
6. "Love and Pain" – 4:19
7. "All The Tears" – 4:49
8. "I Can't Stand It" – 3:37
9. "Up 'N' Down" – 4:20
10. "Afterparty" – 3:38
11. "Tell Me That I'm Dreaming" – 3:52

== Credits ==
- Producers – Alex Reginald Belcher and Tony Dawson-Harrison (tracks: 1 2 5, 7 to 11); Miles Gordon and P Force (tracks 3, 4, 6)
- Engineer – Alex Belcher
- Mastered by Peter Harenberg, Frank Petersen, Nico Mass
- Mixed by Alex Reginald Belcher, Tony Dawson-Harrison
- Design – M. Kowalkowski
- Photography by Helge Strauss
