= Let Me Be Free =

Single by 2 Brothers on the 4th Floor featuring D-Rock and Des'Ray

from the album Dreams
- Released: October 1994
- Genre: Eurodance
- Length: 3:25
- Label: Lowland Records; SGA; ZYX
- Songwriters: Bobby Boer; Dancability; D-Rock
- Producer: 2 Brothers on the 4th Floor

2 Brothers on the 4th Floor featuring D-Rock and Des'Ray singles chronology
"Dreams (Will Come Alive)" (1993)	"Let Me Be Free" (1994)	"Fly (Through the Starry Night)" (1995)

Music video
- "Let Me Be Free" on YouTube

"Let Me Be Free" is a song by Dutch Eurodance group 2 Brothers on the 4th Floor featuring rapper D-Rock and singer Des'Ray, released in November 1994 by labels Lowland, SGA and ZYX Music as the fifth and last single from their debut album, Dreams (1994). It achieved moderate success, becoming a top-10 hit in Israel (3), Italy (5), the Netherlands (6), and a top-20 hit in Belgium and Denmark. On the Eurochart Hot 100, the single peaked at number 42 in December 1994.

== Track listing ==
- 12", Netherlands (1994)
1. "Let Me Be Free" (Extended Version) – 5:17
2. "Let Me Be Free" (Music For Lovers Remix) – 5:47
3. "Let Me Be Free" (Beats 'R' Us Remix) – 6:04
4. "Let Me Be Free" (Lick Remix) – 5:45
5. "Let Me Be Free" (Dancability Club Remix) – 4:52
- CD single, Europe (1994)
1. "Let Me Be Free" (Radio Version) – 3:25
2. "Let Me Be Free" (Beat 'R' Us Radio Mix) – 4:39
- CD maxi, Scandinavia (1994)
1. "Let Me Be Free" (Radio Version) – 3:25
2. "Let Me Be Free" (Beats 'R' Us Radio Mix) – 4:39
3. "Let Me Be Free" (Extended Version) – 5:17
4. "Let Me Be Free" (Beats 'R' Us Mix) – 6:04
5. "Let Me Be Free" (Music For Lovers Mix) – 5:47
6. "Let Me Be Free" (Lick Mix) – 5:45
7. "Let Me Be Free" (Dancability Club Mix) – 4:52
8. "Let Me Be Free" (Album Version) – 3:26

== Charts ==
=== Weekly charts ===
Chart (1994–1995)	Peak position
Belgium (Ultratop 50 Flanders)	11
Denmark (IFPI)	12
Europe (Eurochart Hot 100)	42
Europe (European Dance Radio)	24
Germany (Media Control Charts)	43
Israel (Israeli Singles Chart)	3
Italy (Musica e dischi)	5
Netherlands (Dutch Top 40)	6
Netherlands (Single Top 100)	7
Sweden (Sverigetopplistan)	23

=== Year-end charts ===
Chart (1994)	Position
Netherlands (Dutch Top 40)	67
Netherlands (Single Top 100)	66
