= Impossible (Captain Hollywood Project song) =

1993 single by Captain Hollywood Project

Single by Captain Hollywood Project

from the album Love Is Not Sex
- Released: 1 October 1993
- Genre: Eurodisco; hip-house; techno-pop
- Length: 4:14
- Label: Blow Up; Intercord
- Songwriters: Oliver Reinecke; Giora Schein; Nosie Katzmann; Tony Dawson-Harrison
- Producers: Cyborg; DMP

Captain Hollywood Project singles chronology
"All I Want" (1993)	"Impossible" (1993)	"Flying High" (1995)

Music video
- "Impossible" on YouTube

"Impossible" is a song by German musician Captain Hollywood Project. It was released in October 1993 by labels Blow Up and Intercord as the fourth single from his debut album, Love Is Not Sex (1993), and features vocals by American singer Kim Sanders. The song was co-written by Nosie Katzmann and Tony Dawson-Harrison (real name of Captain Hollywood), and became a notable hit in several countries in Europe and West Asia. But like "All I Want", it achieved moderate success in comparison with the two previous Captain Hollywood Project's singles, "More and More" and "Only with You". A music video was produced to promote the single and filmed in Sweden, featuring Petra Spiegl instead of Sanders.

== Critical reception ==
In his review of the Love Is Not Sex album, Larry Flick from Billboard magazine wrote that "Impossible" "is another study in contrasts, as [Captain] Hollywood ponders the darkness of greed and power, amid a flurry of active, rave-flavored synth-beats. It is during this particular track that he best exhibits the poise and command of rhyme needed to resurrect the dormant hip-house movement." In his weekly UK chart commentary, James Masterton described it as "Euro-disco in the Culture Beat mould".

James Hamilton from Music Week's RM Dance Update named it a "girl wailed gruffy rapped cheesy typical German techno-pop bounder" in his weekly dance column DJ directory. Tony Cross from Smash Hits praised the track, giving it a score of four out of five. He wrote, "Front man Tony Dawson-Harrison [...] has come up with a monster dance hit that's impossible not to shake down to. It has the Euro flavour of hits like Culture Beat's 'Mr Vain' (which Tony had a hand in) with a powered-up rap beginning. Then it grows to its hypnotic vocal chant — "I find you're a little impossible" - which is packed full of attitude. Expect it to chart very high."

== Chart performance ==
"Impossible" was a notable hit on the charts in Europe, entering the top 10 in countries like Denmark (9), Finland (6), Portugal (3), Spain (9), and Sweden (4), as well as on MTV's European Top 20. Additionally, the single was a top-20 hit in Austria (15), Germany (12), Lithuania, the Netherlands (14) and Switzerland (18). On the Eurochart Hot 100, "Impossible" debuted at number 37 in November 1993, after charting in Denmark, Germany, the Netherlands, Spain and Switzerland. It peaked on the chart at number 20 in December, as well as number three on the European Dance Radio Chart. In the United Kingdom, the single reached number 29 in its first week at the UK Singles Chart, on 6 February, with only two weeks inside the chart, but fared better on the UK Music Week Dance Singles chart, peaking at number 14. Outside Europe, "Impossible" was a top-10 hit also in Israel, where it peaked at number ten in its third week on the chart, on 7 December 1993. It spent 6 weeks inside the Israeli top 30.

== Music video ==
The accompanying music video for "Impossible" was directed and produced by Apollon Bild&Film and filmed in Sweden. It did for unknown reasons not feature Kim Sanders, but German singer Petra Spiegl. The video received active rotation on MTV Europe and was B-listed on Germany's VIVA in December 1993 and February 1994. "Impossible" was later made available on Altra Moda Music's official YouTube channel in 2017, having generated more than 12 million views as of late 2025.

== Track listings ==
- 12-inch single (1993)
1. "Impossible" (New Extended Version) – 6:10
2. "Impossible" (Bumpy Version) – 7:56
- CD single (1993)
1. "Impossible" (Radio Edit) – 4:14
2. "Impossible" (New Extended Version) – 6:10
- CD maxi 1 (September 1993)
1. "Impossible" (Radio Edit) – 4:14
2. "Impossible" (New Extended Version) – 6:10
3. "Impossible" (Bumpy Version) – 7:56
- CD maxi 2 (January 1994)
1. "Impossible" (Red Jerry Mix) – 6:49
2. "Impossible" (Red Jerry Dub) – 6:09
3. "Impossible" (Kamo Flage Mix) – 6:22
4. "All I Want" ('94 Club Mix) – 5:56

== Charts ==
=== Weekly charts ===
Weekly chart performance for "Impossible"
Chart (1993–1994)	Peak position
Austria (Ö3 Austria Top 40)	15
Belgium (Ultratop 50 Flanders)	25
Belgium (VRT Top 30 Flanders)	21
Denmark (IFPI)	9
Europe (Eurochart Hot 100)	20
Europe (European Dance Radio)	3
Finland (Suomen virallinen lista)	6
France (SNEP)	40
Germany (Media Control Charts)	12
Ireland (IRMA)	26
Israel (Israeli Singles Chart)	10
Lithuania (M-1)	14
Netherlands (Dutch Top 40)	26
Netherlands (Single Top 100)	14
Portugal (AFP)	3
Spain (AFYVE)	9
Sweden (Sverigetopplistan)	4
Switzerland (Schweizer Hitparade)	18
UK Singles (OCC)	29
UK Dance (Music Week)	14
UK Club Chart (Music Week)	83

=== Year-end charts ===
1993 annual chart performance for "Impossible"
Chart	Position
Netherlands (Dutch Top 40)	183

1994 annual chart performance for "Impossible"
Chart	Position
Europe (Eurochart Hot 100)	88
Sweden (Topplistan)	72

== Release history ==
Release dates and formats for "Impossible"
Region	Date	Format(s)	Label(s)	Ref.
Europe	1 October 1993	—N/a	Blow Up; Intercord	
United Kingdom	24 January 1994	7-inch vinyl; 12-inch vinyl; CD; cassette	Pulse-8	
Australia	11 April 1994	CD; cassette	Possum	
