= Come Take My Hand =

Single by 2 Brothers on the 4th Floor featuring D-Rock and Des'Ray

from the album 2
- Released: September 1995
- Studio: Dancability Studio
- Genre: Eurodance; techno
- Length: 4:02
- Label: Lowland Records; CNR Music; Central Station
- Songwriters: Bobby Boer; Dancability; D-Rock
- Producer: 2 Brothers on the 4th Floor

2 Brothers on the 4th Floor featuring D-Rock and Des'Ray singles chronology
"Fly (Through the Starry Night)" (1995)	"Come Take My Hand" (1995)	"Fairytales" (1996)

Music video
- "Come Take My Hand" on YouTube

"Come Take My Hand" is a song by Dutch Eurodance group 2 Brothers on the 4th Floor featuring rapper D-Rock and singer Des'Ray. It was released in 1995, by Lowland Records, CNR Music and Central Station, as the second single from the group's second album, 2 (1996). Enjoying success in Europe, it was a top-10 hit in Belgium and the Netherlands, and a top-20 hit in Italy and Norway. On the Eurochart Hot 100, the song peaked at number 47 in October 1995. Outside Europe, it peaked at number-one in Israel. The accompanying music video was shot in black-and-white. In 2015, "Come Take My Hand" was released in the Netherlands in a new remix by The Viper (aka Melvin Pelupessy).

== Critical reception ==
Maria Jimenez from Pan-European magazine Music & Media described "Come Take My hand" as a "melodious spin on Euro happy hardbeat".

== Music video ==
The black-and-white music video for "Come Take My Hand" is produced by Arcade Creative and depicts group members Des'Ray and D-Rock in a desert-like setting. They arrives by bus and standing out in the desert, Des'Ray begins to sing. Throughout the video, various people appear, or pass by. Like a man in a motorcycle suit and helmet, a woman with flowers, a clown, a man and woman with a child, watering the desert, an Indian and a farmer with a mustache, standing by a cow. As D-Rock begins to rap, a data animated, mechanical microphone unfolds in front of him. A man, dressed in baroque fashion puts a headset on the head of the rapper, while a data animated bird shows up and flies away. The man with the mustache reveals that his mustache is a fake one. In the end, Des'Ray and D-Rock leaves by the same bus. "Come Take My Hand" was A-listed on Dutch music television channel TMF in October 1995.

== Track listing ==
- 12", Netherlands (1995)
1. "Come Take My Hand" (Beats 'R Us Mix) — 7:57
2. "Come Take My Hand" (Euro Trance Trip) — 5:13
3. "Come Take My Hand" (Extended Version) — 5:10
4. "Come Take My Hand" (K&A's Extended Rave Blast) — 5:50
- CD single, Netherlands (1995)
1. "Come Take My Hand" (Radio Version) — 4:02
2. "Come Take My Hand" (Cooly's Jungle Mix) — 5:25
- CD maxi, Netherlands (1995)
1. "Come Take My Hand" (Radio Version) — 4:02
2. "Come Take My Hand" (Extended Version) — 5:10
3. "Come Take My Hand" (Cooly's Jungle Mix) — 5:25
4. "Come Take My Hand" (Beats R Us Mix) — 7:57
5. "Come Take My Hand" (K&A's Happy Hardcore Blast) — 5:38
6. "Come Take My Hand" (K&A's Extended Rave Blast) — 5:50
7. "Come Take My Hand" (Lick Mix) — 5:04
8. "Come Take My Hand" (Euro Trance Trip) — 5:13

== Charts ==
=== Weekly charts ===
Chart (1995)	Peak positions
Belgium (Ultratop Flanders)	9
Europe (Eurochart Hot 100)	47
Israel (Israeli Singles Chart)	1
Italy (Musica e dischi)	14
Netherlands (Dutch Top 40)	4
Netherlands (Single Top 100)	4
Norway (VG-lista)	12
Sweden (Sverigetopplistan)	28

=== Year-end charts ===
Chart (1995)	Positions
Belgium (Ultratop Flanders)	42
Israel (Israeli Singles Chart)	31
Netherlands (Dutch Top 40)	38
Netherlands (Single Top 100)	24
