= Love and Pain =

Love and Pain may refer to:

- Love and Pain (Munch), an 1895 painting by Edvard Munch
- Love and Pain (song), a 1996 song by Captain Hollywood Project
- Love and Pain, a 2008 book by Thaddeus Golas
- Love and Pain, a 1993 album by Super Heroines

== See also ==
- Love & Pain, a 2006 album by Eamon
- Love and Pain and the Whole Damn Thing, a 1973 American film
