= Over & Over (Captain Hollywood Project song) =

Single by Captain Hollywood Project

from the album The Afterparty
- Released: 1996
- Genre: Eurodance
- Length: 3:44
- Label: Intercord; Blow Up
- Songwriter: Tony Dawson-Harrison
- Producers: Miles Gordon; P-Force

Captain Hollywood Project singles chronology
"The Way Love Is" (1995)	"Over & Over" (1996)	"Love and Pain" (1996)

Music video
- "Over & Over" on YouTube

"Over & Over" is a song by German musician known under the pseudonym of Captain Hollywood Project, released in 1996 by labels Intercord and Blow Up as the first single from his third album, The Afterparty (1996). Featuring uncredited vocals by singer Petra Spiegl, the song peaked at number 13 in Finland, number 35 in Austria and number 45 in Germany. The accompanying music video was directed by Frank Paul Husmann-Labusga.

== Track listing ==
- 12", Germany
1. "Over & Over" (Cappella Mix) – 7:10
2. "Over & Over" (D-Generator Remix" – 5:53
3. "Over & Over" (Force & Gordon's Extended Dance Mix) – 6:05
4. "Over & Over" (Jules Verne Remix) – 7:36
- CD maxi, Europe
1. "Over & Over" (Force & Gordon's Radio Mix) – 3:44
2. "Over & Over" (Force & Gordon's Extended Dance Mix) – 6:05
3. "Over & Over" (D-Generator Remix) – 5:53
4. "Over & Over" (Jules Verne Remix) – 7:35
5. "Over & Over" (Cappella Remix) – 7:12

== Charts ==
Chart (1996)	Peak position
Austria (Ö3 Austria Top 40)	35
Finland (Suomen virallinen lista)	13
Germany (GfK)	45
