= Mirror of Love (2 Brothers on the 4th Floor song) =

Single by 2 Brothers on the 4th Floor featuring D-Rock and Des'Ray

from the album 2
- Released: July 1996
- Studio: Dancability Studio
- Genre: Eurodance
- Length: 3:29
- Label: Lowland; CNR Music; Popular Records
- Songwriters: Bobby Boer; Dancability; D-Rock
- Producer: 2 Brothers on the 4th Floor

2 Brothers on the 4th Floor featuring D-Rock and Des'Ray singles chronology
"Fairytales" (1996)	"Mirror of Love" (1996)	"There's a Key" (1996)

Music video
- "Mirror of Love" on YouTube

"Mirror of Love" is a song by Dutch Eurodance group 2 Brothers on the 4th Floor featuring rapper D-Rock and singer Des'Ray. It was released in July 1996 as the fourth single from their second album, 2 (1996), peaking at number six in the Netherlands, number 19 in Finland, number 22 in Belgium and number 44 in Sweden. On the Eurochart Hot 100, the song reached number 90 in August 1996.

== Track listing ==
- 12" single, France (1996)
1. "Mirror of Love" (Extended Version) – 4:26
2. "Mirror of Love" (Mastermindz Freaky R&B Clubmix) – 5:17
- CD single, Netherlands (1996)
1. "Mirror of Love" (Radio Version) – 3:29
2. "Mirror of Love" (2 Fabiola Radio Mix) – 3:48
- CD maxi, Netherlands (1996)
1. "Mirror of Love" (Radio Version) – 3:29
2. "Mirror of Love" (Mastermindz R&B Radio Remix) – 3:47
3. "Mirror of Love" (Fabiola Radio Mix) – 3:48
4. "Mirror of Love" (Extended Version) – 4:26
5. "Mirror of Love" (Mastermindz Freaky R&B Clubmix) – 5:17
6. "Mirror of Love" (Fabiola Clubmix) – 5:05

== Charts ==
Weekly chart performance for "Mirror of Love"
Chart (1996)	Peak positions
Belgium (Ultratop 50 Flanders)	22
Europe (Eurochart Hot 100)	90
Finland (Suomen virallinen lista)	19
Israel (Israeli Singles Chart)	4
Netherlands (Dutch Top 40)	7
Netherlands (Single Top 100)	6
Sweden (Sverigetopplistan)	44
