= 2 Brothers on the 4th Floor =

Dutch musical group

- Origin: Utrecht, the Netherlands
- Genres: Eurodance, happy hardcore
- Years active: 1990–2001, 2002–present
- Members: Martin Boer; Bobby Boer; Masta; Li-Ann
- Past members: Desray; D-Rock; Da Smooth Baron MC; Peggy "The Duchess"; Gale Robinson
- Website: 2brothersonthe4thfloor.nl

2 Brothers on the 4th Floor is a Dutch musical group created in 1990 by brothers Martin and Bobby Boer. The group has had success in many countries around the world, including their native Netherlands, the United States and the United Kingdom. Besides Martin and Bobby Boer, other members of the club music project include Dutch singer Li-Ann and Masta, while among past ones there were Des'ray and D-Rock.

== History ==
=== Early career: 1990–1991 ===
The Boer brothers had already been experimenting with music in a small bedroom when they finally gained note in 1990, when their single Can't Help Myself was picked up by Dutch radio stations and became an international hit. The brothers then brought together rapper Da Smooth Baron MC and singers Peggy "The Duchess" and Gale Robinson to form their stage act. The release of their next single, Turn Da Music Up, was somewhat less successful, but helped the band to gain name recognition.

2 Brothers on the 4th Floor made two hit singles together before separating. Martin Boer moved into a new professional studio and started making remixes under the name Dancability Productions, making remixes for artists such as Becky Bell, Twenty 4 Seven and Luv' (for their Megamix '93), while Bobby Boer designed record covers and CD inlays for other artists.

=== 1993–1994: Revival and Dreams ===
2 Brothers on the 4th Floor was revived by the Boer brothers in 1993. Bobby joined Martin in his studio and, after some time, released the single Never Alone. This single was the first to be launched with rapper D-Rock (René Philips) and singer Desirée Manders (stage name: Des'Ray). The song Dreams, which is the title song of the band's first album, was a song that captured the essence of Eurodance. Due to the genre's popularity when the song was released in 1994, the song became a hit both nationally and internationally. The band's renewed style and concept was accepted well by Dutch audience. Never Alone topped the charts for weeks and went gold. Dreams, the band's subsequent single, went straight to number one and remained on the charts for weeks (as well as reaching the top 30 on Billboard's Hot Dance Club Songs chart in the United States) and Let Me Be Free, its successor, remained in the top ten nationally for some time.

=== 1995–1997: 2 ===
In 1995 and 1996, 2 Brothers on the 4th Floor further widened their success with the singles Fly (Through the Starry Night), Come Take My Hand and Fairytales, changing their style to happy hardcore. These singles topped the charts in various European countries. At the end of 1996, the band released the single There's a Key and its second album, 2.

After 2, the band shifted styles and first recorded the single One Day, an R&B track that departed from their typical Eurodance style. Afterwards, they returned to their previous Eurodance style with the single I'm Thinkin' of U.

=== 1998–2001: Single releases ===
In March 1998, 2 Brothers on the 4th Floor released the single Do U Know, a mid- to low-tempo pop track. At the beginning of autumn 1998, the single The Sun Will Be Shining was released. It contains remixes by Mark van Dale & Enrico, Dance Therapy and the Dub Foundation. Packaged with The Sun Will Be Shining was a CD-ROM featuring the videos of "The Sun Will Be Shining" and "The Making Of".

On 5 February 1999 the single Heaven Is Here was released. 29 October that year saw the release of the single Living in Cyberspace. On 16 June 2000 the single "Wonderful Feeling" was released. On 29 June 2001 the single "Stand Up And Live" was released.

=== 2002–2026: Hiatus and return ===
The duo had never released its third album due to problems with record companies. The band toured for many years at 90's revival concerts and festivals alongside other acts. The group released "The Very Best of" in April 2016. In addition to their duties with 2 Brothers on the 4th Floor, Des'Ray has a solo career, and D-Rock is working with the rapper/MC E-Life.

=== D-Rock and Des'Ray's departure ===
After 30 years of performing, it was revealed in November 2025 that D-Rock will be retiring from performing due to his battle with Parkinson's disease. In solidarity, Des'Ray will also step down from performing with the group, but will continue with her solo career. Their final show together was held on 4 April 2026 to date.

=== 2026-present: Keep the Dream Alive ===
2 Brothers on the 4th floor announced in February 2026 that the band will proceed doing live shows with Masta and Li-Ann, the latter of whom was a former member of fellow Dutch Eurodance group, Twenty 4 Seven. Masta has been doing live shows with Des'Ray and D-Rock for 16 years before the passing of the torch. The new duo will keep the dream and legacy alive by bringing the energy and love for the music to all the fans.

== Discography ==
=== Studio albums ===
List of albums, with selected details and chart positions
Title	Details	Peak chart positions
Title	Details	NLD
Dreams	Release date: 30 July 1994; Label: Lowland; Formats: CD	5
2	Release date: 30 November 1996; Label: Lowland; Formats: CD	18

=== Singles ===
List of singles, with selected chart positions and certifications
Title	Year	Peak chart positions										Certifications (sales thresholds)	Album
Title	Year	NLD	BEL (Fl)	BEL (Wa)	GER	ITA	NOR	SWE	SWI	UK	US Dance	Certifications (sales thresholds)	Album
"Can't Help Myself"	1990	6	21	—	32	—	—	—	—	—	6		Dreams
"Turn da Music Up"	1991	17	22	—	—	—	—	—	—	—	—		Dreams
"Never Alone"	1993	2	3	—	—	16	—	38	—	—	—	NVPI: Gold	Dreams
"Dreams (Will Come Alive)"	1994	1	8	—	25	4	—	14	32	93	—	NVPI: Gold	Dreams
"Let Me Be Free"	1994	7	11	—	43	5	—	23	—	—	—		Dreams
"Fly (Through the Starry Night)"	1995	6	19	30	—	12	—	24	—	—	—		2
"Come Take My Hand"	1995	4	9	—	—	14	12	28	—	—	—		2
"Fairytales"	1996	4	46	—	—	—	—	49	—	—	—		2
"Mirror of Love"	1996	6	22	—	—	—	—	44	—	—	—		2
"There's a Key"	1996	7	—	—	—	—	—	—	—	—	—		2
"Christmas Time" (Christmas version of "There Is a Key")	1996	—	—	—	—	—	—	—	—	—	—		2
"One Day"	1997	15	—	—	—	—	—	—	—	—	—		2
"I'm Thinkin' of U"	1997	20	48	—	—	—	—	—	—	—	—		Singles only
"Do You Know?"	1998	26	—	—	—	—	—	—	—	—	—		Singles only
"The Sun Will Be Shining"	1998	29	—	—	—	—	—	—	—	—	—		Singles only
"Heaven Is Here"	1999	52	—	—	—	—	—	—	—	—	—		Singles only
"Living in Cyberspace"	1999	28	—	—	—	—	—	—	—	—	—		Singles only
"Wonderful Feeling"	2000	44	—	—	—	—	—	—	—	—	—		Singles only
"Stand Up and Live"	2001	—	—	—	—	—	—	—	—	—	—		Singles only
"—" denotes releases that did not chart
