= Animals or Human =

Studio album by Captain Hollywood Project
- Released: March 30, 1995
- Recorded: July 1994– January 1995
- Length: 60:41
- Label: Blow Up (Intercord) INT 845.579
- Producer: Tony Dawson-Harrison aka Captain Hollywood Project, Thorsten Adler, Nosie Katzmann, Attack II

Captain Hollywood Project chronology
Love Is Not Sex (1993)	Animals or Human (1995)	The Afterparty (1996)

Professional ratings
Review scores
Source	Rating
Music Week	3/5 stars

Animals or Human is a second album by Eurodance group Captain Hollywood Project released on March 30, 1995, by Blow Up. The record includes the singles "Flying High", "Find Another Way", and "The Way Love Is".

== Track listing ==
1. "Flying High" (single mix) – 3:45
2. "The Way Love Is" – 5:39
3. "One Love" – 5:55
4. "I Need a Lover" – 5:48
5. "Animals or Human" – 5:22
6. "Find Another Way" (single mix) – 3:56
7. "Odyssey of Emotions" – 6:06
8. "Relax Your Mind" – 6:02
9. "Sea Of Dreams" – 5:37
10. "Lost In Gravity" – 6:20
11. "Get Hypnotized" – 5:52

== Charts ==
Chart	Peak position
Dutch Albums (Album Top 100)	53
Finnish Albums (Suomen virallinen lista)	13
German Albums (Offizielle Top 100)	42
Hungarian Albums (MAHASZ)	17
Swedish Albums (Sverigetopplistan)	38
Swiss Albums (Schweizer Hitparade)	41

== Credits ==
- Artwork [Direction] – Eike König
- Artwork, Design – Eike König, Silver Haze
- Photography By – Esser & Strauß GmbH

== Notes ==
℗1995 DMP GmbH
©1995 Intercord Ton GmbH
