= Dreams (Will Come Alive) =

1994 single by 2 Brothers on the 4th Floor

Single by 2 Brothers on the 4th Floor featuring D-Rock and Des'Ray

from the album Dreams
- Released: June 1994
- Recorded: 1994
- Genre: Eurodance; rave
- Length: 4:26
- Label: Lowland Records
- Songwriters: Bobby Boer; Dancability; D-Rock
- Producers: Bobby Boer; Martin Boer

2 Brothers on the 4th Floor featuring D-Rock and Des'Ray singles chronology
"Never Alone" (1993)	"Dreams (Will Come Alive)" (1994)	"Let Me Be Free" (1994)

Music video
- "Dreams (Will Come Alive)" on YouTube

"Dreams (Will Come Alive)" is a song by Dutch Eurodance group 2 Brothers on the 4th Floor featuring D-Rock and Des'Ray. It was released in June 1994 by Lowland Records as the fourth single from the group's debut album, Dreams (1994), and is their most commercially successful single. The song was co-written and produced by producer-brothers Bobby and Martin Boer, and peaked at number-one in the Netherlands for three weeks. It was also used in the Dutch movies Flodder 3 and New Kids Nitro and in the Italian film Happy as Lazzaro.

In 2009, the song was remixed and released by Italian DJ Gabry Ponte and Format-C, and in 2016, a new version was released, as "Dreams 2016 (Will Come Alive)".

== Chart performance ==
"Dreams (Will Come Alive)" was a major hit across Europe and remains the group's most successful single, alongside "Never Alone", peaking at number-one in their native Netherlands for three weeks and at number two for three weeks. The song entered the top 10 also in Italy (4), Finland (6) and Belgium (8). Additionally, it was a top-20 hit in Denmark (17), Iceland (11) and Sweden (14), and a top-30 hit in Germany (25), where it spent 17 weeks within the German Singles Chart between August and December 1994.

As the only single by the group to chart in the UK, "Dreams (Will Come Alive)" peaked at number 93 in its first and only week at the UK Singles Chart, on July 9, 1994. On the Eurochart Hot 100, it reached number 25 in October 1994, in its 14th week on the chart, after charting in Belgium, Denmark, Germany, Italy, Netherlands, Sweden and Italy. On the European Dance Radio Chart, it peaked at number 13 in the same period. Outside Europe, the song was a huge hit in Israel, both debuting and peaking at number two on the chart, on June 21, 1994. In Latin America, it became a top-10 hit in Uruguay. In Australia, it only reached number 185 on the ARIA singles chart.

== Critical reception ==
James Hamilton from Music Week's RM Dance Update named the song an "old fashioned rave style squawking shrill girl wailed and at times inevitable gruff gruff rapped Euro hit" in his weekly dance column. Maria Jimenez from Music & Media described the group's sound as "a pumped sound somewhere between Culture Beat and 2 Unlimited", noting "the familiar male rapper/female singer combination".

== Music video ==
A music video was produced to promote the single and was directed by Czar. It features a storyline of a little black boy in sunglasses admiring a silver car and test driving it. Other scenes show a little white girl in a silver dress. In between, group members Des'Ray and D-Rock performs. The video received "prime break out" rotation on MTV Europe in August 1994 and was B-listed on German music television channel VIVA. "Dreams (Will Come Alive)" was later made available on Dutch label Arcade's official YouTube channel in 2013, and had generated more than 21 million views as of late 2025 on the platform.

== Track listings ==
- CD maxi-single (Europe, 1994)
1. "Dreams (Will Come Alive)" (Radio Version) - 4:22
2. "Dreams (Will Come Alive)" (Twenty 4 Seven Trance Mix) - 5:48
3. "Dreams (Will Come Alive)" (Lick Mix) - 4:16
4. "Dreams (Will Come Alive)" (D.J. Paradize Underground Mmix) - 4:07
5. "Dreams (Will Come Alive)" (Extended Version) - 5:05
6. "Dreams (Will Come Alive)" (Twenty 4 Seven Trance Dub) - 4:10
- Gabry Ponte Vs. Format-C - Digital EP (Europe, 2009)
1. "Dreams" (Video Edit)
2. "Dreams" (Extended Mix)
3. "Dreams" (UK Radio Edit)
4. "Dreams" (UK Extended Mix)
5. "Dreams" (Format-C Remix)
6. "Dreams" (Paki & Jaro Remix)

- Takraweekend Remix (Philippines, 2025)
1. "Come On, Dream On!" (Takraweekend Edit)
2. "Dreams" (Epic Trance Edit)

== Charts ==
=== Weekly charts ===
Weekly chart performance for "Dreams (Will Come Alive)"
Chart (1994–1995)	Peak position
Australia (ARIA)	185
Belgium (Ultratop 50 Flanders)	8
Belgium (VRT Top 30 Flanders)	8
Denmark (IFPI)	17
Europe (Eurochart Hot 100)	25
Europe (European Dance Radio)	13
Finland (Suomen virallinen lista)	6
France (SNEP)	60
Germany (GfK)	25
Iceland (Íslenski Listinn Topp 40)	11
Israel (Israeli Singles Chart)	2
Netherlands (Dutch Top 40)	1
Netherlands (Single Top 100)	1
Sweden (Sverigetopplistan)	14
Switzerland (Schweizer Hitparade)	32
UK Singles (Official Charts)	93
UK Pop Tip Club Chart (Music Week)	3
Uruguay (UPI)	8

=== Year-end charts ===
Year-end chart performance for "Dreams (Will Come Alive)"
Chart (1994)	Position
Belgium (Ultratop)	44
Netherlands (Dutch Top 40)	10
Netherlands (Single Top 100)	16
Sweden (Topplistan)	79
