= Flying High (Captain Hollywood Project song) =

1994 single by Captain Hollywood Project

Single by Captain Hollywood Project

from the album Animals or Human
- Released: November 1994
- Recorded: 1994
- Studio: Chopstick-Studio, Hamburg, Germany
- Genre: Eurodance
- Length: 3:44
- Label: Blow Up; Intercord
- Songwriters: Attack II; Tony Dawson-Harrison; Tom Jacques G. Coin; Thorsten Adler
- Producer: DMP

Captain Hollywood Project singles chronology
"Impossible" (1993)	"Flying High" (1994)	"Find Another Way" (1995)

Music video
- "Flying High" on YouTube

"Flying High" is a song by German musician known under the pseudonym of Captain Hollywood Project, released in November 1994, by labels Blow Up and Intercord, as the first single from his second album, Animals or Human (1995). Vocals are by American singer Lori Glori, but uncredited. It is a fast and strong Eurodance song, it achieved moderate success in several countries. A second CD maxi composed of two new remixes was launched in February 1995. The accompanying music video was directed by Rainer Thieding. Ten years later, in 2005, a new remix of "Flying High" was released, reaching the Top 20 on European club charts.

== Chart performance ==
"Flying High" was quite successful on the charts in Europe, entering the top 10 in Austria (10), Belgium (8), Denmark (7), Finland (4), the Netherlands (4) and Sweden (7), as well as on MTV's European Top 20, where it hit number three. Additionally, the single peaked within the top 20 in Germany (18), Italy (16), Switzerland (15) and Norway (12). plus on the Eurochart Hot 100, where "Flying High" reached number 15. It was also a top-40 hit in France (40), and in the UK, it peaked at number 58 in its first week at the UK Singles Chart, on 26 March 1995. In Scotland, it went to number 75. Outside Europe, the song became a top-10 hit in Israel, peaking at number six in January same year.

== Critical reception ==
British magazine Music Week wrote, "Hoping to emulate last year's Top 30 success with 'Impossible', 'Flying High' is a commercial number that brings to mind the dance/pop success of 2 Unlimited et al."

== Music video ==
The accompanying music video for "Flying High" was directed by Rainer Thieding for Chopstick Films and filmed in Hamburg, Germany. It received active rotation on MTV Europe and was A-listed on German music television channel VIVA in February 1995. Thieding would also direct the video for Captain Hollywood's next single, "The Way Love Is".

== Track listings ==
- CD maxi 1 (November 1994)
1. "Flying High" (radio mix) — 3:45
2. "Flying High" (extended mix) — 6:41
3. "Flying High" (belly mix) — 5:25
4. "Flying High" (spaceship mix) — 6:05

- CD maxi 2 (January 1995)
1. "Flying High" (God's groove remix) — 6:34
2. "Flying High" (Perplexer remix) — 5:40

== Charts ==
=== Weekly charts ===
Chart (1995)	Peak position
Austria (Ö3 Austria Top 40)	10
Belgium (Ultratop 50 Flanders)	13
Belgium (Ultratop 50 Wallonia)	19
Belgium (VRT Top 30 Flanders)	8
Denmark (IFPI)	7
Europe (Eurochart Hot 100)	15
Europe (European Dance Radio)	1
Finland (Suomen virallinen lista)	4
France (SNEP)	40
Germany (GfK)	18
Israel (Israeli Singles Chart)	6
Italy (Musica e dischi)	16
Netherlands (Dutch Top 40)	4
Netherlands (Single Top 100)	6
Norway (VG-lista)	12
Scotland (OCC)	75
Sweden (Sverigetopplistan)	7
Switzerland (Schweizer Hitparade)	15
UK Singles (OCC)	58

=== Year-end charts ===
Chart (1995)	Position
Belgium (Ultratop 50 Flanders)	67
Belgium (Ultratop 50 Wallonia)	85
Europe (Eurochart Hot 100)	66
Germany (Media Control)	92
Latvia (Latvijas Top 50)	155
Netherlands (Dutch Top 40)	45
Netherlands (Single Top 100)	68
Sweden (Topplistan)	50

== Release history ==
Region	Date	Format(s)	Label(s)	Ref.
Germany	November 1994	CD	Blow Up; Intercord	
United Kingdom	20 March 1995	12-inch vinyl; CD; cassette	Pulse-8; Blow Up	
