= Never Alone (2 Brothers on the 4th Floor song) =

Single by 2 Brothers on the 4th Floor featuring D-Rock and Des'Ray

from the album Dreams
- Released: November 1993
- Studio: Danzability
- Genre: Eurodance
- Length: 4:11
- Label: Bounce; SGA; ZYX
- Songwriters: Bobby Boer; Dancability; D-Rock
- Producers: Bobby Boer; 2 Brothers on the 4th Floor; Martin Boer

2 Brothers on the 4th Floor featuring D-Rock and Des'Ray singles chronology
"Turn da Music Up" (1991)	"Never Alone" (1993)	"Dreams (Will Come Alive)" (1994)

Music video
- "Never Alone" on YouTube

"Never Alone" is a song by Dutch Eurodance group 2 Brothers on the 4th Floor. It was released in November 1993 as the third single from their debut album, Dreams (1994). Produced by brothers Martin and Bobby Boer, the song was their first single featuring rapper D-Rock and singer Des'Ray. It was a number-one hit in Brazil, Israel and South Africa. In the group's native Netherlands, the single peaked at number two for three weeks. In 2014, new remixes of the song by JoeySuki and Jonathan Pitch were released. Its accompanying music video sees the duo performing on a beach in Mexico.

== Background ==
In a broadcast on Dutch radio in January 1994, 2 Brothers on the 4th Floor said about the song,

"Snap's "Rhythm Is a Dancer" has set the tone for the whole Euro dance movement, laying a trend for melody which acts including Haddaway, Culture Beat and ourselves follow. What we all do is more or less 'copy' the Snap sounds. The bass and a catchy synth line are the spine of the genre."

== Chart performance ==
"Never Alone" was one of the group's most successful singles, along with "Dreams (Will Come Alive)", charting on several continents. In Europe, it peaked at number two in the group's native Netherlands, being held off reaching the top spot by Paul de Leeuw/Annie De Rooy's "Ik Wil Niet Dat Je Liegt/Waarheen Waarvoor". It spent three weeks at that position and ten weeks inside the top 10. The single also entered the top 10 in Belgium, reaching number three. Additionally, it was a top 20 hit in Italy (16) and a top 40 hit in Sweden (38), as well as on the Eurochart Hot 100, where it peaked at number 31 in February 1994. But on the European Dance Radio Chart, the single was even more successful, reaching number three. Outside Europe, "Never Alone" peaked at number-one in Brazil, Israel (February 1994) and South Africa.

== Critical reception ==
Larry Flick from American music magazine Billboard commented that the song "is a pure, unabashed hi-NRG anthem, pumpin' with a throaty vamp by Des'Ray and a perfunctory rap by D-Rock. This one is scant seconds away from exploding worldwide—and it is still available for U.S. picking. Act fast..." Maria Jimenez from Music & Media described the group's sound as "a pumped sound somewhere between Culture Beat and 2 Unlimited", and added that "the familiar male rapper/female singer combination" drive their album Dreams.

== Music video ==
A black-and-white music video was produced to promote the single, featuring group members D-Rock and Des'Ray performing on the beach in Mexico. In between, different local people appear. The video was later published on YouTube in 2010 and by May 2023, it had generated more than eight million views.

== Track listing ==
- 12", Netherlands (1993)
1. "Never Alone" (Club Mix)
2. "Dancin' Together" (Cowboy Dub)
3. "Never Alone" (Extended Mix)
- CD single, Netherlands (1993)
1. "Never Alone" (Euro Radio Mix) – 4:11
2. "Never Alone" (US Radio Mix) – 3:34
- CD maxi, Germany (1993)
1. "Never Alone" (Euro Radio Mix) – 4:11
2. "Never Alone" (US Radio Mix) – 3:34
3. "Never Alone" (Club Mix) – 5:20
4. "Never Alone" (Extended Euro Mix) – 5:48
5. "Dancin' Together" (Cowboy Dub) – 3:41
6. "Never Alone" (Brothers Edit) – 5:08

== Charts ==
=== Weekly charts ===
Chart (1993–1994)	Peak positions
Australia (ARIA)	187
Belgium (Ultratop Flanders)	3
Brazil	1
Europe (Eurochart Hot 100)	31
Europe (European Dance Radio)	3
Israel (Israeli Singles Chart)	1
Italy (Musica e dischi)	16
Netherlands (Dutch Top 40)	2
Netherlands (Single Top 100)	2
South Africa (RISA)	1
Sweden (Sverigetopplistan)	38

=== Year-end charts ===
Chart (1993)	Positions
Netherlands (Dutch Top 40)	133

Chart (1994)	Positions
Belgium (Ultratop Flanders)	45
Israel (Israeli Singles Chart)	8
Netherlands (Dutch Top 40)	12
Netherlands (Single Top 100)	19

=== Decade-end charts ===
Chart (1990–1999)	Rank
Netherlands (Dutch Top 40)	50
