= Summer Summer =

Single by Loft

from the album Wake the World
- B-side: "Reggae Roots"
- Released: April 1993
- Studio: DMP Studios
- Genre: Eurodance; reggae fusion
- Length: 4:00
- Label: RCA
- Songwriters: Attack II; Nosie Katzmann
- Producer: Cyborg DMP GmbH

Loft singles chronology
"Summer Summer" (1993)	"Hold On" (1993)

Music video
- "Summer Summer" on YouTube

"Summer Summer" is a song by German Eurodance group Loft, released in April 1993 by RCA Records as their debut single. In 1994, it was included on their first album, Wake the World (1994). Written by Nosie Katzmann and Attack II (Michael Eisele), it features vocals by singer Gina Mohammed. Becoming a major hit in Europe, the song peaked at number seven in Finland and number ten in Germany, and became a top-20 hit in Denmark and Greece. Additionally, it was a top-30 hit in Austria and a top-40 hit in Switzerland. On the Eurochart Hot 100, it reached number 50 in September 1993. Outside Europe, it was a top-30 hit also in Australia and Israel. A colorful music video was produced to promote the single. In 2003, a new version was released, titled "Summer Summer (Recall)".

== Track listing ==
- 12" single, Netherlands (1993)
1. "Summer Summer" (12"-Mix) — 5:52
2. "Summer Summer" (Radio-Edit) — 4:00
3. "Reggae Roots" (Loft-Mix) — 6:13
- CD maxi, Germany (1993)
1. "Summer Summer" (Radio-Edit) — 4:00
2. "Summer Summer" (12"-Mix) — 5:52
3. "Reggae Roots" (Loft-Mix) — 6:13
- CD maxi (remix), Germany (1993)
1. "Summer Summer" (Radio-Edit) — 4:00
2. "Summer Summer" (Club-Mix) — 7:10
3. "Summer Summer" (3-Nuts Remix) — 5:52

== Charts ==
Chart (1993–94)	Peak position
Austria (Ö3 Austria Top 40)	29
Denmark (IFPI)	15
Europe (Eurochart Hot 100)	50
Europe (European Dance Radio)	8
Finland (Suomen virallinen lista)	7
Germany (GfK)	10
Greece (Pop + Rock)	13
Israel (Israeli Singles Chart)	24
Quebec (ADISQ)	17
Switzerland (Schweizer Hitparade)	36
