= Love and Pain (song) =

Single by Captain Hollywood Project

from the album The Afterparty
- Released: 1996
- Genre: Eurodance
- Length: 3:37
- Label: Mighty
- Songwriters: Miles Gordon; P-Force; Tony Dawson-Harrison
- Producer: Masterboy

Captain Hollywood Project singles chronology
| "Over & Over" (1996) | "Love and Pain" (1996) | "Axel F 2003" (2003) |

Music video
- "Love & Pain" on YouTube

"Love and Pain" is a song by German musician known under the pseudonym of Captain Hollywood Project. It was released in 1996, by label Mighty, as the second single from his third album, The Afterparty (1996). The song was produced by German Eurodance group Masterboy and features vocals by Petra Spiegl. It peaked at number nine in Finland and number 50 in Germany. The accompanying music video was directed by P. Ythall & F. Fernberg, produced by Lawrence Novitch and filmed in Venice Beach, California. Pan-European magazine Music & Media wrote in their review of the song, "While most EHR singles have slowed to mid-tempo for the summer, this track kicks in with a fast dance beat. The melody is classic Euro-dance, but Catania's House And Pain radio remix is pure house."

== Track listing ==
- 12", Germany
1. "Love and Pain" (Maxi Mix) — 5:53
2. "Love and Pain" (Double Pain Mix) — 5:25
3. "Love and Pain" (Funkies Revenge Mix) — 4:58
- CD single, France
1. "Love and Pain" (Single Mix)
2. "Love and Pain" (House and Pain Radio Mix)
- CD maxi, Europe
1. "Love and Pain" (Single Mix) — 3:37
2. "Love and Pain" (House and Pain Radio Mix) — 3:19
3. "Love and Pain" (Maxi Mix) — 5:53
4. "Love and Pain" (Funkies Revenge Mix) — 4:58
5. "Love and Pain" (Double Pain Mix) — 5:25

== Charts ==
| Chart (1996) | Peak position |
|---|---|
| Finland (Suomen virallinen lista) | 9 |
| Germany (GfK) | 50 |
