= Nina Gerhard =

German singer (born 1974)

Nina
- Born: Nina Gerhard; 10 December 1974 (age 51); Darmstadt, Germany
- Genres: Eurodance, electronic
- Occupation: Singer
- Years active: 1992–present

Nina Gerhard (born 10 December 1974), also known as Nina, is a German singer best known as the voice of Captain Hollywood Project and for her 1994 hit "The Reason Is You".

== Career ==
Nina performed vocals on the Captain Hollywood Project single "More and More", which was a #1 hit in Germany and a top 20 hit on the Billboard Hot 100. Also the follow-up single "Only with You". She later recorded the solo single "The Reason Is You", which was a #2 hit in the Belgian singles chart. Her follow-up single, "Until All Your Dreams Come True", peaked at #17.
