= Intermission (band) =

German Eurodance project

Intermission is a German Eurodance project, which was successful in Europe from 1993 to 1996. The biggest hit "Piece of My Heart" was released in late 1993.

Behind Intermission was the Dance Music Production (DMP), a German producer team from Frankfurt am Main which compromised Michael Eisele aka Attack II, Thorsten Adler, aka Tom Tom wedge Jacques G. Coin and Jürgen Katzmann. For the first single "Honesty" the team released in 1993, the singer was Nina, who had already vocalized on several hits by Captain Hollywood. The second single "Piece of My Heart", which was sung by Valerie Scott, reached the top ten in Germany and Austria.

"Six Days" and "Give Peace a Chance" were hits in 1994. The vocals were performed by Lori Glori, whose voice also coined the hits of Centory and Loft. In the same year the album Piece of My Heart was released. It contained all the previous Intermission songs in their original single versions. Because it was released under the name "Intermission feat. Lori Glori", the original voices remain uncredited. In 1995 Intermission made the hit "All Together Now". It was only successful in Switzerland. A few months later, the production team put by the single "Planet Love". Complemented with vocals by Raquel Gomez, "Planet Love" became a hit in Germany where it peaked at #24.

"Miracle of Love", released in 1996, was a small hit in Germany. The last Intermission publication, "Blow Your Mind", was a collaboration with DJ MARSS and Lori Glori returned to sing for the project in 1997. It hit the shelves, but missed a chart position.

In late 2026, the act announced its comeback through the record label DunaBeats Classic Records and successful producers Michael Eisele (Attack II) and Frank Müller (Franky Miller). The new line-up features vocalist Toni and rapper Prince.

== Discography ==
=== Albums ===
- 1994: Piece of My Heart (Ger # 82)

=== Singles ===
Year	Single	Peak chart positions						Album
Year	Single	AUS	GER	AUT	SWI	BEL (FLA)	UK	Album
1993	"Honesty"	—	—	—	—	—	—	Piece of My Heart
1993	"Piece of My Heart"	188	8	9	40	42	—	Piece of My Heart
1994	"Six Days"	186	20	18	22	—	82	Piece of My Heart
1994	"Give Peace A Chance"	—	29	—	25	—	—	Piece of My Heart
1995	"All Together Now"	—	—	—	38	—	—	singles only
1995	"Planet Love"	—	24	26	40	—	203	singles only
1996	"Miracle Of Love"	—	87	—	—	—	—	singles only
1996	"Real Love"	—	—	—	—	—	—	singles only
1997	"Blow Your Mind"	—	—	—	—	—	—	singles only
"—" denotes releases that did not chart or were not released.
