= Loft (group) =

German band

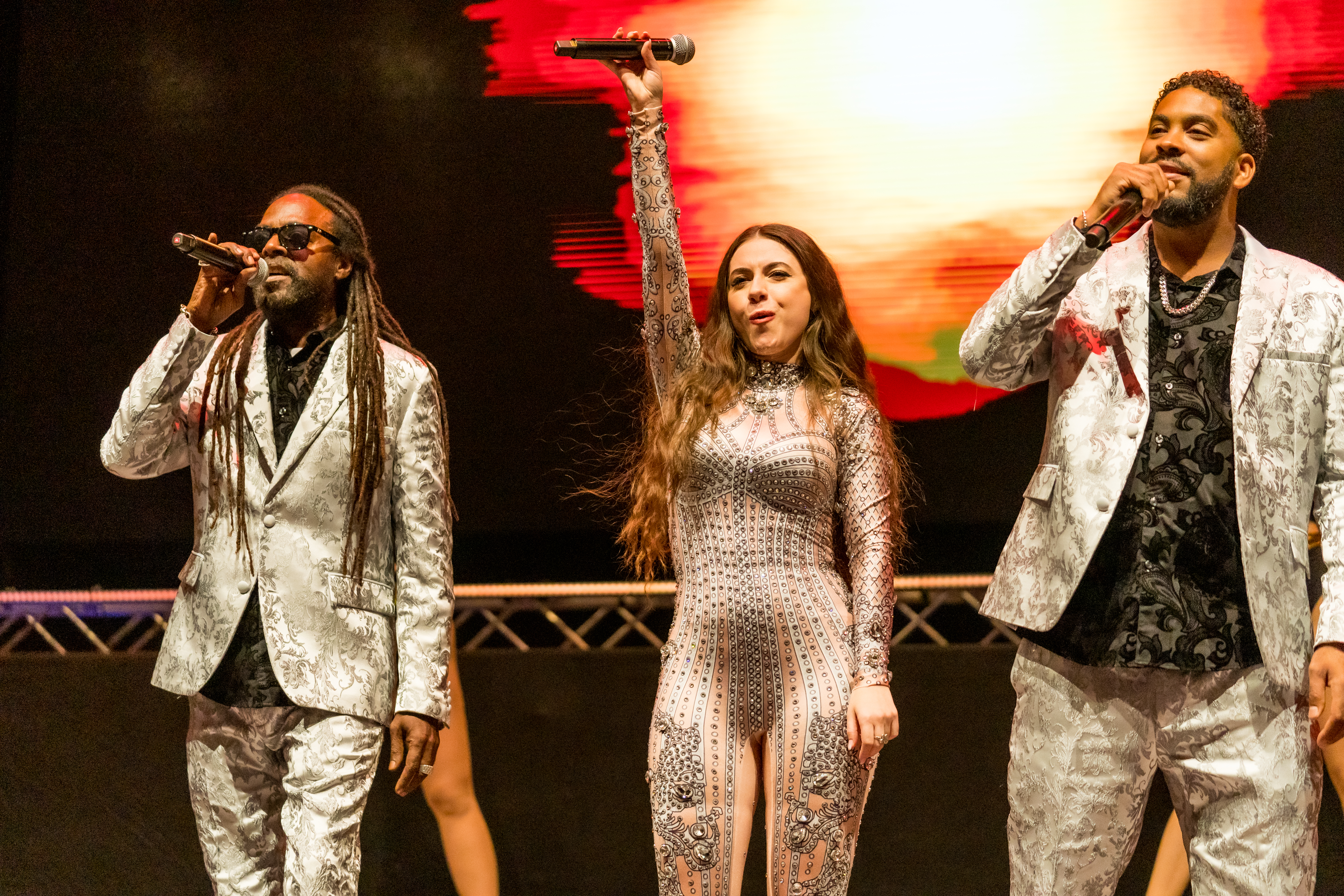
- Loft in 2019

Background information
- Origin: Hamburg, Germany
- Genres: Eurodance, reggae fusion
- Years active: 1994-1999
- Past members: Christiane Eiben; Courtney Williams; Cyborg DMP GmbH; Gina Mohammed; Kim Sanders; Lori Glori; Richard Williams; Sandra Steinborn

Loft was a German electronic music group who had a number of hit singles in the 1990s, including "Summer Summer", "Hold On", "Love Is Magic", "Don't Stop Me Now", "Mallorca" and "Wake the World".

== History ==
The brothers Courtney and Richard Williams, who came from Kingston (Jamaica), founded Loft in 1993. The two rappers were supported by singers Lori Glori, Gina Mohammed, Sandra Steinborn, Kim Sanders and Sue (pseudonym: Suzie Electric). The producers of the project were Michael Eisele and Dietmar Stehle (DMP). Loft designated their music as "roots rock reggae".

Their first single was 1993 "Summer Summer" and became a hit in Europe. Their second single "Hold On" featured vocals from Kim Sanders and was a dance hit in Canada. In April 1994, the debut album Wake the World was released. The second album, Future World was released in May 1995 with vocals provided by Sandra Steinborn and Christiane Eiben. Two more singles were released in 1996, "Mallorca" and "Long John Silver" after which the group decided to take a break.

After five years, the group made a comeback and released the single "Summer Summer (Recall)" in 2003, followed by others.

In November 2019, Loft made a comeback in Mannheim, Germany by performing at the "90's Festival". They announced that singer-songwriter Rosalina Biolan (known as "Rossalina") is their new group member. Born in Romania, Rossalina is an artist who played and toured before together with Barry White Orchestra

== Discography ==
=== Studio albums ===
Title	Details	Peak chart positions		
Title	Details	FIN	GER	SWI
Wake the World	Release date: April 1994; Label: RCA Records; Formats: CD	31	32	37
Future World	Release date: May 1995; Label: RCA Records; Formats: CD	—	91	—
"—" denotes releases that did not chart

=== Singles ===
Year	Single	Peak chart positions					Album
Year	Single	AUS	CAN Dance	FIN	GER	SUI	Album
1993	"Summer Summer"	29	—	7	10	36	Wake the World
1993	"Hold On"	26	2	19	21	30	Wake the World
1994	"Love Is Magic"	25	—	7	25	32	Wake the World
1994	"Wake the World"	—	—	15	—	—	Wake the World
1995	"Don't Stop Me Now"	—	—	17	61	—	Future World
1995	"Free Me"	—	—	—	—	—	Future World
1995	"It's Raining Again"	—	—	—	96	99	Future World
1996	"Mallorca"	—	—	—	90	—	Singles only
1996	"Long John Silver"	—	—	—	—	—	Singles only
"—" denotes releases that did not chart
