= Only with You (Captain Hollywood Project song) =

"Only With You"

Single by Captain Hollywood Project

from the album Love Is Not Sex
- B-side: "Remix"
- Released: 20 December 1992
- Genre: Eurodance
- Length: 3:52
- Label: Blow Up
- Songwriters: Oliver Reinecke; Giora Schein; Nosie Katzmann; Tony Dawson-Harrison; Dietmar Stehle
- Producer: Cyborg

Captain Hollywood Project singles chronology
"More and More" (1992)	"Only With You" (1992)	"All I Want" (1993)

Music video
- "Only with You" on YouTube

"Only With You" is a song recorded by German musician known under the pseudonym of Captain Hollywood Project. It was released in December 1992, by label Blow Up, as the second single from his debut album, Love Is Not Sex (1993). The song is co-written by Hollywood and Nosie Katzmann with Oliver Reinecke, Giora Schein and Dietmar Stehle, and features vocals by German singer Nina Gerhard. It was successful on the charts, peaking within the top 10 in at least 12 countries, and reaching number two in both Finland and Portugal. It was released at the end of 1992 and several remixes were also added on a new CD maxi two months after. The accompanying music video was directed by Walter Knofel and filmed in Austria.

== Critical reception ==
Larry Flick from Billboard magazine wrote, "Dance act that scored a recent breakthrough radio and club hit with 'More & More' should have little trouble building momentum with this well-structured, totally contagious spinner. Uplifting lyrics are voiced with the Captain's solid rapping and Nina Gerhard singing at the chorus." Dave Sholin from the Gavin Report stated, "Everytime 'More & More' hit the air, I couldn't help thinking, "What a great radio record." CHP's follow-up has the same exciting feel."

Alan Jones from Music Week described it as a "maddeningly commercial, pulsating song [that] alternates between male rap attack and female chorus in all versions". He concluded, "Comparisons with Snap! are obvious, and the end result may be the same - a smash." In 1994, he added that it "also has a haunting quality". James Hamilton from the RM Dance Update deemed it a "girl cooed chesy Euro flutterer". James Hunter from Vibe felt the song "crosscuts his stairmastered Barry White raps with female choruses, sliding that combo against angular techno riffing and housey programs."

== Chart performance ==
Like "More and More", "Only with You" was successful on the charts in Europe, although it sold under half the amount of its predecessor, reaching the top 5 in Austria (5), Belgium (3), Denmark (3), Finland (2), Germany (4), Portugal (2), Spain (3), Sweden (5) and Switzerland (5). Additionally, the single peaked within the top 10 also in France (7) and the Netherlands (9), as well as on the Eurochart Hot 100, where it reached number six and on MTV's European Top 20. In the UK, it reached its highest position as number 67 in its first week at the UK Singles Chart, on 21 March 1993. On the UK Dance Singles chart by Music Week, it fared better, peaking at number 27. Outside Europe, it hit number two on the RPM Dance/Urban chart in Canada and was also successful in Israel, peaking at number six there, on 27 April 1993.

The single earned a gold record in Germany, with a sale of 250,000 units.

== Music video ==
The music video for "Only with You" was directed by Walter Knofler and filmed in Braunau, Austria. It was later made available by Altra Moda Music on YouTube in 2017, and had generated more than 30 million views as of early 2026.

== Track listings ==
- 7" single (1992)
1. "Only with You" (radio mix) – 3:52
2. "Only with You" (dance mix) – 5:34
- CD single (1992)
1. "Only with You" (radio mix) – 3:52
2. "Only with You" (dance mix) – 5:34
- CD maxi 1 (January 1993)
1. "Only with You" (radio mix) – 3:52
2. "Only with You" (dance mix) – 5:34
3. "Only with You" (house mix) – 6:18
4. "Only with You" (trance mix) – 7:17
- CD maxi 2 (March 1993)
1. "Only with You" (fantasy remix) – 5:43
2. "Only with You" (magic remix) – 6:04
3. "Only with You" (faze-2 remix) – 7:20
4. "Only with You" (relentless remix) – 7:22
- 12" maxi (March 1993)
1. "Only with You" – 5:43
2. "Only with You" – 6:04
3. "Only with You" – 7:20

== Charts ==
=== Weekly charts ===
Chart (1993–1994)	Peak position
Austria (Ö3 Austria Top 40)	5
Belgium (Ultratop 50 Flanders)	4
Belgium (VRT Top 30 Flanders)	3
Belgium (Ultratop 50 Wallonia)	6
Canada Dance/Urban (RPM)	2
Denmark (IFPI)	3
Europe (Eurochart Hot 100)	6
Europe (European Dance Radio)	22
Finland (Suomen virallinen lista)	2
France (SNEP)	7
Germany (GfK)	4
Israel (Israeli Singles Chart)	6
Netherlands (Dutch Top 40)	14
Netherlands (Single Top 100)	9
Portugal (AFP)	2
Spain (AFYVE)	3
Sweden (Sverigetopplistan)	5
Switzerland (Schweizer Hitparade)	5
UK Singles (Official Charts)	67
UK Dance (Music Week)	27
US Dance Club Play (Billboard)	10
US Maxi-Singles Sales (Billboard)	23

=== Year-end charts ===
Chart (1993)	Position
Belgium (Ultratop)	53
Canada Dance/Urban (RPM)	33
Europe (Eurochart Hot 100)	30
Germany (Media Control)	26
Netherlands (Dutch Top 40)	96
Netherlands (Single Top 100)	74
Sweden (Topplistan)	58
Switzerland (Schweizer Hitparade)	30

== Certifications ==
Country	Certification	Date	Sales certified
Germany	Gold	1993	250,000
