= More and More (Captain Hollywood Project song) =

1992 single by Captain Hollywood Project

- Standard cover art

Single by Captain Hollywood Project

from the album Love Is Not Sex
- Released: 29 July 1992
- Genre: Eurodance; electro pop; R&B
- Length: 4:11
- Label: Blow Up; Dino Music
- Songwriters: Oliver Reinecke; Giora Schein; Nosie Katzmann; Tony Dawson-Harrison
- Producers: Cyborg; DMP

Captain Hollywood Project singles chronology
"More and More" (1992)	"Only with You" (1993)

Music video
- "More and More" on YouTube

"More and More" is a song by German Eurodance music project Captain Hollywood Project. It was released in July 1992 by the record labels Blow Up and Dino Music as the first single from their first album, Love Is Not Sex (1993). The female singer on the song is German singer Nina Gerhard. It reached No. 1 in Germany and was a top-five hit in Austria, Belgium, Denmark, Israel, Italy, Norway, Sweden and Switzerland. "More and More" also found success in Australia and North America, peaking at No. 15 in Canada, No. 17 in the United States, and No. 43 in Australia. Overall, the single has sold over seven million units worldwide. Two different music videos were produced to promote the single; one was directed by Bruce Ashley.

== Production and influence ==
The music for "More and More" was written by Nosie Katzmann, Giora Schein, Manfred Setzer and Oliver Reinecke. Lyrics were written by front man/rapper Tony Dawson-Harrison (Captain Hollywood) and Nosie Katzmann. As executive producer of the single, Harrison worked with the collaborating production teams known as DMP (including Katzmann) and Cyborg (Marc Kamradt and Frank Schlingloff). Harrison chose singer Nina Gerhard to provide the chorus vocals for the track. His voice was electronically modified to sound deeper and this would also later inspire the producers of M.C. Sar & The Real McCoy.

American entertainment company BuzzFeed ranked "More and More" at No. 81 in their "The 101 Greatest Dance Songs of the '90s" list in 2017.

== Critical reception ==
Larry Flick from Billboard magazine described the song as "a seductive pop/house affair that only lightly nicks the surface of the Captain's obvious talent for combining complex groove patterns with simple, brain-embedding hooks and melodies." He added, "The beats are rugged, and are topped by a breezy, radio-minded R&B melody. The give-and-take between sultry female vocals and deepthroated male rapping is appropriately seductive." Dave Sholin from the Gavin Report commented, "Germany, not Hollywood, is home to The Captain, who has already racked up enough chart activity to become this week's Record To Watch. Many are comparing this production to Snap's 'Rhythm Is a Dancer' with its Euro-dance feel. One very hot entry!"

In his weekly UK chart commentary, James Masterton stated that "More and More" "is in all honesty one of the more inspiring dance records this year and deserves a greater chart position than it looks like achieving." Pan-European magazine Music & Media also compared it to Snap!'s 1992 hit, noting that they used the same recipe. The reviewer added further that "the basis is 1982 type of electro pop strengthened by dance elements such as a male rapper and female backing vocalists." Martin Pearson from Music Week's RM Dance Update noted "the trance-drenched moodiness" of the song, stating that it "is a musical barrage, right down to the laser-guided bassline and armour-plated pop hook."

== Chart performance ==
Upon its release on 29 July 1992, "More and More" became a hit in several countries in Europe. In Germany, it reached No. 1 for four weeks with a total of 36 weeks inside the German singles chart. The single was also a number-one hit on the French Top Dance chart, and a top-five hit in Austria, Belgium, Denmark, Italy, Norway, Sweden, and Switzerland. In Belgium, it peaked at No. 2 for two weeks, spending 14 weeks in total within the Ultratop 50 singles chart. In Denmark, the single also reached No. 2 for three weeks. In France, Greece, and the Netherlands, the single was a top-10 hit. In the United Kingdom, it reached No. 23 during its third week on the UK Singles Chart, on 14 November 1993, spending six weeks within the UK Top 100. On the Eurochart Hot 100 and European Dance Radio Chart, the song reached No. 3 and 8, respectively.

Outside Europe, "More and More" peaked at No. 5 in Israel, reached No. 16 in Zimbabwe in Africa, and was a crossover pop hit in North America, where it reached No. 1 on the Canadian RPM Dance/Urban chart and the US Billboard Maxi-Singles Sales chart, where it spent two weeks in July 1993. It also peaked at No. 14 on the US Cash Box Top 100 and No. 17 on the Billboard Hot 100. In Oceania, it peaked at No. 43 on the ARIA Top 50 singles chart. The single was awarded with a platinum record in Germany, after 500,000 singles were sold there, and a gold record in Greece.

== Track listings ==
- German maxi-CD single and Australian CD single
1. "More and More" – 6:20
2. "More and More" (trance mix) – 6:08
3. "More and More" (single version) – 4:11
- Dutch 7-inch single

A. "More and More" (single version) – 4:11
B. "More and More" – 6:20

- UK 12-inch single

A1. "More and More" (Red Underground vocal mix) – 6:28
A2. "More and More" (Red Underground dub) – 6:28
B1. "More and More" (Trance to Dance mix) – 6:08
B2. "More and More" (original club mix) – 6:20

- UK maxi-CD single
1. "More and More" (radio mix) – 4:08
2. "More and More" (12-inch version) – 6:20
3. "More and More" (trance version) – 6:08
4. "More and More" (Karizma remix) – 6:58
5. "More and More" (remix instrumental) – 6:10
- US and Canadian maxi-CD single
1. "More and More" – 6:20
2. "More and More" (underground mix) – 7:23
3. "More and More" (SoBe mix) – 6:00
4. "More and More" (underground instrumental mix) – 7:23

== Charts ==
=== Weekly charts ===
Chart (1992–1993)	Peak position
Australia (ARIA)	43
Austria (Ö3 Austria Top 40)	3
Belgium (Ultratop 50 Flanders)	2
Canada Top Singles (RPM)	15
Canada Dance/Urban (RPM)	1
Denmark (IFPI)	2
Europe (Eurochart Hot 100)	3
Europe (European Dance Radio)	8
Europe (European Hit Radio)	29
Finland (Suomen virallinen lista)	13
France (SNEP)	7
France Dance (Top Dance)	1
Germany (GfK)	1
Greece (Pop + Rock)	8
Iceland (Íslenski Listinn Topp 40)	16
Ireland (IRMA)	15
Israel (Israeli Singles Chart)	5
Italy (Musica e dischi)	3
Netherlands (Dutch Top 40)	6
Netherlands (Single Top 100)	7
Norway (VG-lista)	3
Sweden (Sverigetopplistan)	3
Switzerland (Schweizer Hitparade)	3
UK Singles (Official Charts)	23
UK Airplay (ERA)	41
UK Dance (Music Week)	21
UK Club Chart (Music Week)	97
US Billboard Hot 100	17
US Dance Club Play (Billboard)	3
US Maxi-Singles Sales (Billboard)	1
US Top 40/Mainstream (Billboard)	13
US Top 40/Rhythm-Crossover (Billboard)	16
US Cash Box Top 100	14
Zimbabwe (ZIMA)	16

=== Year-end charts ===
Chart (1992)	Position
Germany (Media Control)	37

Chart (1993)	Position
Austria (Ö3 Austria Top 40)	21
Belgium (Ultratop)	29
Canada Dance/Urban (RPM)	6
Europe (Eurochart Hot 100)	17
Germany (Media Control)	23
Netherlands (Dutch Top 40)	50
Netherlands (Single Top 100)	34
Sweden (Topplistan)	23
Switzerland (Schweizer Hitparade)	12
US Billboard Hot 100	79
US Dance Club Play (Billboard)	36
US Maxi-Singles Sales (Billboard)	4

== Certifications ==
Region	Certification	Certified units/sales
Germany (BVMI)	Platinum	500,000^{^}
Greece (IFPI Greece)	Gold	10,000^{^}
^{^} Shipments figures based on certification alone.

== Release history ==
Region	Date	Format(s)	Label(s)	Ref.
Europe	29 July 1992	7-inch vinyl; 12-inch vinyl; CD	Blow Up; Dino Music	
Australia	28 March 1993	CD; cassette	Possum; Blow Up	
United Kingdom	25 October 1993	7-inch vinyl; 12-inch vinyl; CD; cassette	Pulse-8	
