= Captain Hollywood Project =

German eurodance music project

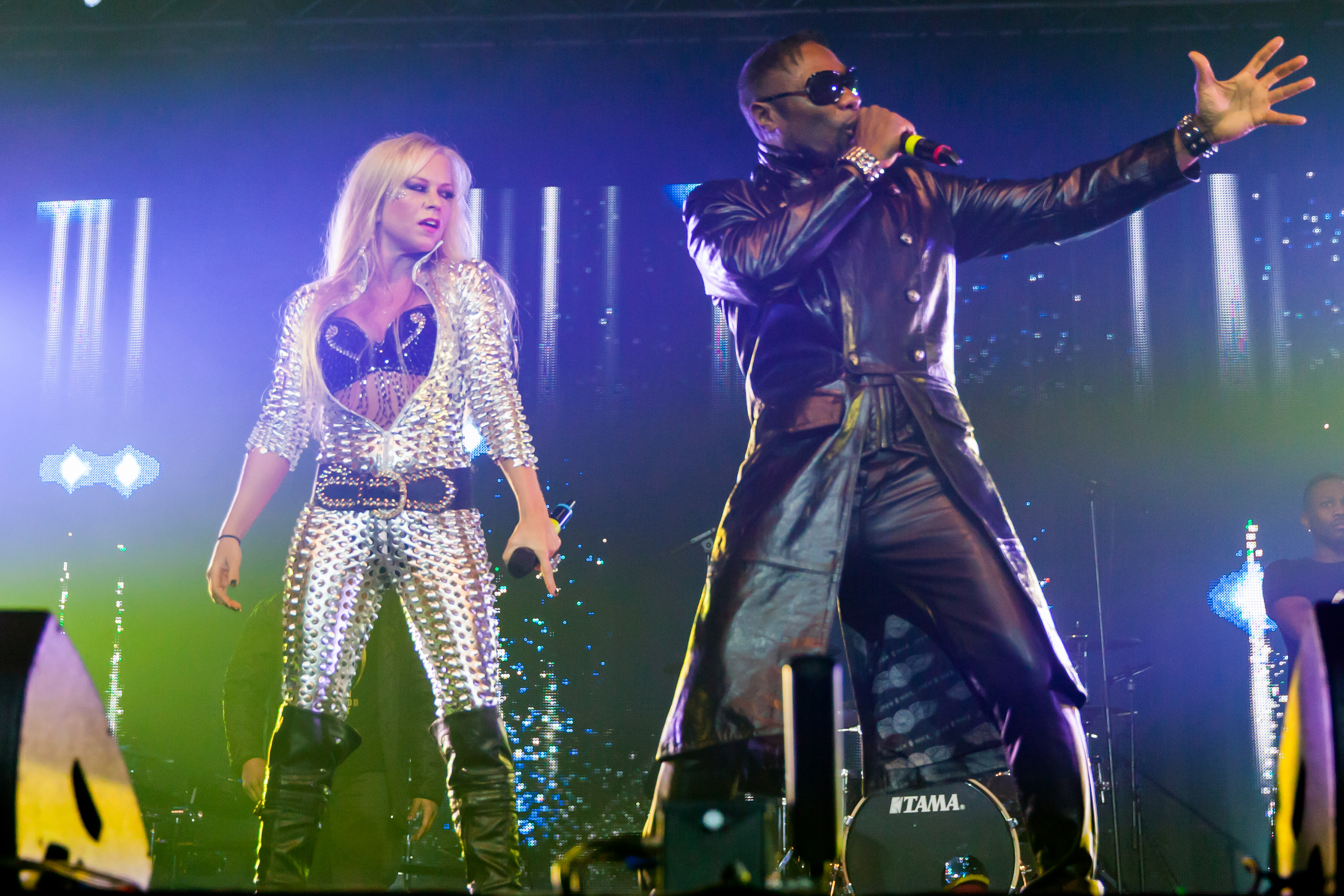

Background information
- Also known as: Captain Hollywood; The Pioneer of Eurodance
- Origin: Nuremberg, Germany
- Genre: Eurodance
- Years active: 1992–2001, 2008-present
- Labels: Intercord, Blow Up, Yes Music
- Members: Tony Dawson-Harrison; Shirin von Gehlen (a.k.a. Shirin Amour)
- Past members: Nina Gerhard; Petra Spiegl
- Website: Official website

Captain Hollywood Project is a German eurodance music project best known for the hits "More and More," "Only with You" and "Flying High." At the peak of its success in the 1990s, the project achieved ten top-20 hits on European music charts. The project was first formed in 1990 in Nuremberg, Germany by American rapper/singer, dancer and music producer Tony Dawson-Harrison (a.k.a. Captain Hollywood). When first naming the project, Harrison chose the name 'Captain Hollywood Project' in order to distinguish his new music for the project from his music from previous years. He also chose the name to give himself the creative freedom as executive producer to involve any singer, songwriter or producer of his choice when producing each of the new songs for the project. Even though the act has been viewed as a one-man act starring Harrison as the rapper/frontman, an ensemble of female backup singers, dancers and backing musicians have been traditionally included in the act by Harrison. Today, Captain Hollywood Project is recognized as a live performing duo act starring Harrison and singer/dancer Shirin von Gehlen (a.k.a. Shirin Amour) as the project's lead singer and frontwoman. Together with their live musicians and dancers, Harrison and von Gehlen perform the Captain Hollywood Project hits year-round at concert venues in the United States, Canada, South America, Europe, Russia and Australia.

== Biography ==
=== Early history ===
Before creating the Captain Hollywood Project in 1990, creator Tony Dawson-Harrison was a dancer, choreographer and music star in Europe. A native of Newark, New Jersey, Harrison originally gained his stage name in 1982 while stationed in Germany as a U.S. Army captain. During his off-duty hours, he would entertain his military friends on base by performing street dance moves in his captain's uniform. As a result, his fellow officers nicknamed him “Hollywood” and later “Captain Hollywood”. Harrison's career began in 1983 after his television debut as Captain Hollywood on the German music chart television show Formel Eins. For his guest appearance on the show, he did a three-minute body popping dance routine to the Jonzun Crew song "Pack Jam". Harrison quickly gained credit for being the first American to actually introduce the art forms to Germany and all of Europe in the early 1980s. When his active military duty ended in 1983, he relocated to Germany and worked as the lead dance choreographer on Formel Eins.

=== Dancer and choreographer ===
While working as a choreographer on Formel Eins in the 1980s, Harrison worked with major artists like C.C. Catch, La Toya Jackson, Kim Wilde, Paula Abdul, Natalie Cole, Milli Vanilli and many other performers. He was chosen to represent the country at the 1984 Cannes Film Festival premiere of the breakdance film Beat Street. Harrison also landed a cameo role as a dancer in the 1985 cult German film "Macho Man". When he entered the music business in 1986, he made a tradition of choreographing his own live act when performing with his team of backup dancers. In the 1990s, he opened a successful dance school in Germany called the "Captain Hollywood Dance Academy" and later developed a unique style of choreography for his live act called the Crew Lock, a mixture of military style movements and locking. Artists such as DJ Bobo, Haddaway and several others have collaborated with Harrison extensively when planning, staging and choreographing a number of their live shows. By the year 2000, Harrison transitioned into working behind the scenes as a choreographer, manager and producer of boy bands in the United States and Canada. He has worked with the bands O-Town, 3rd Wish, B4-4 and Prymary Colorz.

=== 1985–1987: Early success in Germany ===
Between 1985 and 1987, Harrison achieved his first musical successes as a rapper, singer and music producer in Germany. He independently released singles "Deborah", "Soulsister",< "Grand Piano", a solo album Do That Thang, and many other dance music tracks. The success of his early hits helped to establish him in the music business as a serious musician, solo artist and music producer.

=== 1989–1990: Twenty 4 Seven ===
In 1989, Harrison co-founded and produced the Holland-based act Twenty 4 Seven with the Dutch producer Ruud van Rijen. As co-producer, choreographer, rapper and frontman, Harrison led singer Nance Coolen and backup dancers Giovanni Falco (a.k.a. Hanks), and Wolfgang Reis (a.k.a. Jacks) on a successful year-long run in the UK and the Netherlands. Twenty 4 Seven became recognised for its memorable dance routines featured in their music videos and in their live act. The group successfully charted with the hit singles "I Can't Stand It!", "Are You Dreaming?" and the album Street Moves, while also completing a successful three month European tour with MTV London that same year. Harrison decided to leave the act in 1990 in order to return to his solo career and to dedicate himself to his music project.

=== 1992–1996: Mainstream success ===
==== “Love Is Not Sex” ====
Between 1992 and 1994, Harrison released four hit eurodance singles ("More and More", "Only with You", "All I Want" and "Impossible") and the album ("Love Is Not Sex"). The first single "More and More" quickly became a worldwide crossover hit when released in July 1992. The single was a major hit in Germany, where it remained at No. 1 for three weeks. By 1993, the single had reached the No. 1 position for 2 weeks on the US Billboard Maxi singles charts, while also reaching No. 1 on charts in Canada and Switzerland. In Austria, France and Italy the single charted at No. 2 and in the UK and Holland at No. 3. In Sweden, Denmark and all Scandinavian territories "More and More" reached the No. 5 position. It also came in at No. 6 in Spain and No. 8 in China. The single was also a hit in Russia. Because of the commercial success of the single worldwide, the single quickly became a major influence on record labels and music producers in Europe. For this reason, Harrison is often regarded by many critics to be "The Pioneer of Eurodance". In December 1992, the follow-up single "Only with You" was released. It became a Top 5 hit in Austria, Belgium, Germany, Sweden and Switzerland and was later certified Gold in Germany for reaching 250,000 commercial sales. The single also became a Top 10 hit in the U.S. Billboard charts. In March 1993, the debut Captain Hollywood Project album, "Love Is Not Sex" was released. The album tracks "All I Want" and "Impossible" were later picked from the album to be singles and were released early in 1994. "All I Want" and "Impossible" both became Top 20 worldwide hits when released.

==== “Animals or Human” (2nd Album) ====
In 1995, the album Animals or Human was released. The album tracks "Flying High," "Find Another Way" and "The Way Love Is" were selected from the album to be singles. Of the three single, "The Way Love Is" was the only single to not chart as high other singles in comparison.

==== “The Afterparty” (3rd Album) ====
In 1996, Harrison decided to make some changes with his regards to his music production team and recruited producers P. Force and Alex Belcher for the production of his third album The Afterparty The single "Over & Over" was released followed by two more singles "Love and Pain" and "The Afterparty".

=== 2000–2007: Captain Hollywood — The Producer ===
After many successful years of achieving chart topping hits and touring worldwide, Harrison decided to shift his focus to working more as a music producer and composer behind the scenes. In 2000, he relocated to the United States and settled in St. Pete Beach, Florida. Later that same year, music impresario and boy band mastermind Lou Pearlman hired Harrison to be co-producer for the first season of the reality series Making the Band. The series documented Pearlman's nationwide talent search and casting of his third boy band creation named O-Town. Not only did Harrison help mentor the band members, he also produced their first songs, choreographed all their early dance routines and trained them in dance and live performing techniques. He also served as composer for the score music heard in the first season of the series. The show's casting format and high television ratings turned Harrison into one of the most sought after music composers for reality television at that time. He later became a manager and choreographer for the bands: 3rd Wish, B4-4 and Prymary Colorz. He has also worked extensively with Nick Carter of the band Backstreet Boys.

==== Music Collaborations ====
As a music producer and composer, Harrison has always experimented with new sounds and styles when doing new productions. During his career as Captain Hollywood Project, Harrison produced music for other artists while also managing his own career. In recent years, he has done collaborations with other eurodance artists in addition to working with artists from different genres. He has recorded songs with Turbo B of Snap!, DJ Bobo and Haddaway. He has also done records with major hip hop artists like Krayzie Bone of Bone Thugs-n-Harmony and Ol' Dirty Bastard of the Wu-Tang Clan.

=== 2008–present: Captain Hollywood Project Revival ===
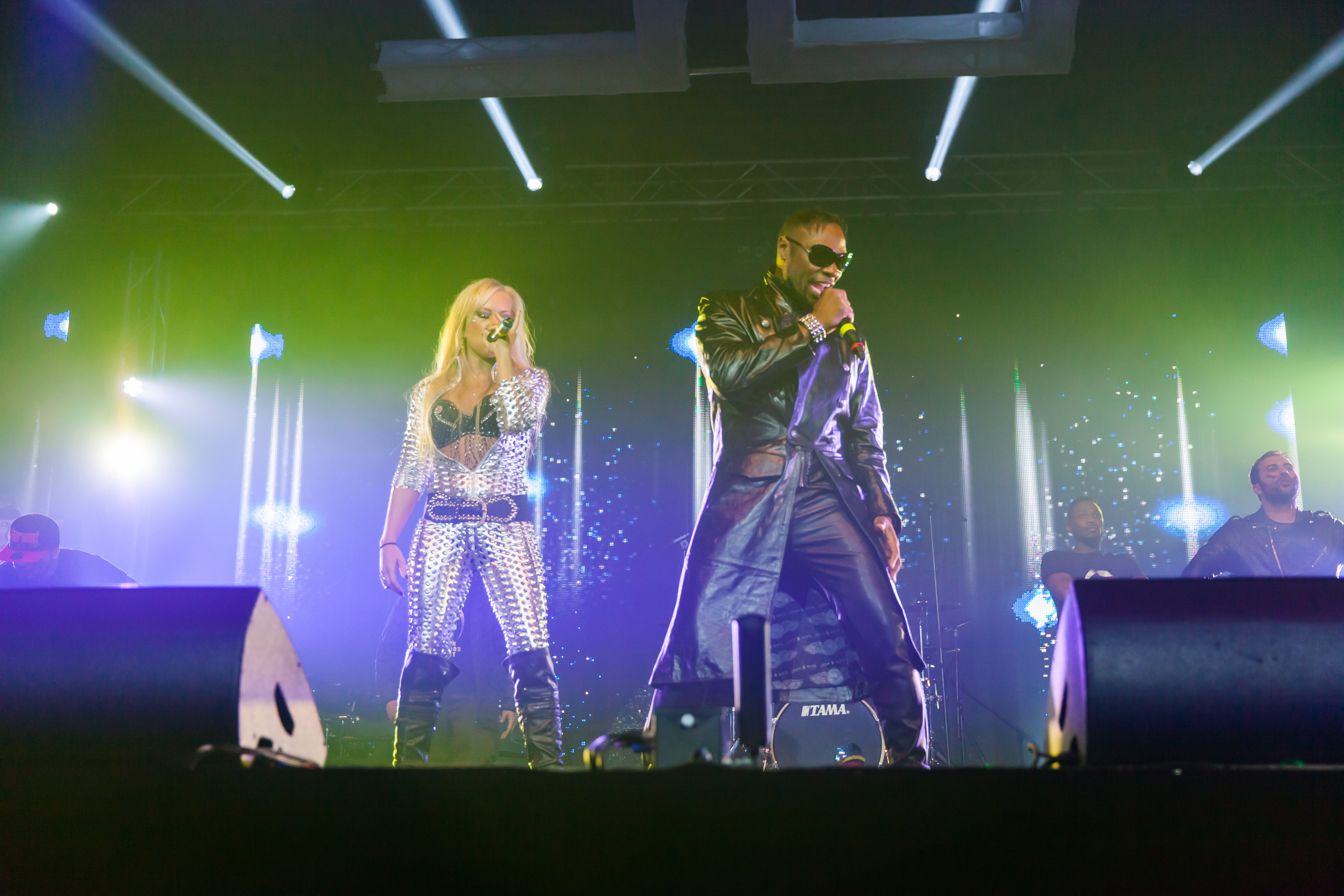
Shirin Amour & Captain Hollywood in Mannheim, Germany (2014)

In 2008, Harrison co-produced two new Captain Hollywood singles "More & More Recall" and "It Hurts With You") exclusively for release in the UAE with producer DJ Base. Two years later, Harrison brought back the Captain Hollywood Project as a special guest act for DJ Bobo's massive Fantasy tour. In response to the overwhelmingly positive reception from fans and general audiences to his presence on the tour, Harrison decided to officially revive Captain Hollywood Project as a live touring act after being on hiatus for so many years.

For the revival, Harrison recruited his wife Shirin von Gehlen (a.k.a. Shirin Amour) to co-star with him as the new lead singer and frontwoman for the act. A native of Düsseldorf, Germany, von Gehlen is a trained singer, dancer, musician and choreographer with an extensive background in live performing and artistic gymnastics. Harrison and von Gehlen first met in 2000 in Germany and married in 2006 in Orlando, Florida, USA. She has previously worked as a dancer and choreographer for the German reality talent show Deutschland sucht den Superstar (DSDS), the RTL II Popstars show winners Overground and DJ Tomekk and the boy band 3rd Wish. As a choreographer duo, Harrison and von Gehlen continue to work as choreographers of video, music and stage productions worldwide while also touring as Captain Hollywood Project. Before bringing back the project for DJ Bobo's Fantasy tour, both Harrison and von Gehlen spent a total of three months in Switzerland helping to plan, stage and choreograph the tour while also producing new songs for DJ Bobo's live act which performed in over 20 major German cities.

After over 20 years of music creation, Harrison and von Ghelen continue to perform with their band of live musicians and dancers at concert venues worldwide.

== Discography ==
=== Studio albums ===
Title	Album details	Peak chart positions					
Title	Album details	GER	AUT	CAN	NL	SWE	SWI
Love Is Not Sex	Released: March 1, 1993; Label: Blow Up (EMI); Formats: CD, Cassette, LP	9	15	60	33	16	9
Animals or Human	Released: March 30, 1995; Label: Blow Up (Intercord); Formats: CD, Cassette, LP	42	—	—	53	38	41
The Afterparty	Released: November 18, 1996; Label: Mighty (Universal); Formats: CD, Cassette, LP	—	—	—	—	—	—
"—" denotes items which were not released in that country or failed to chart.

=== Singles ===
Title	Year	Peak chart positions										Certifications	Album
Title	Year	GER	AUT	BEL (FLA)	CAN	NLD	NOR	SWE	SWI	UK	US	Certifications	Album
"More and More"	1992	1	3	2	15	7	3	3	3	23	17	GER: Platinum	Love Is Not Sex
"Only with You"	1993	4	5	4	—	9	—	5	5	61	—	GER: Gold	Love Is Not Sex
"All I Want"	1993	22	25	32	—	28	—	—	30	—	—		Love Is Not Sex
"Impossible"	1993	12	15	25	—	14	—	4	18	29	—		Love Is Not Sex
"Flying High"	1994	18	10	13	—	6	12	7	15	58	—		Animals or Human
"Find Another Way"	1995	22	19	37	—	40	—	14	25	93	—		Animals or Human
"The Way Love Is"	1995	71	—	—	—	—	—	—	—	—	—		Animals or Human
"Over & Over"	1996	45	35	—	—	—	—	—	—	—	—		The Afterparty
"Love and Pain"	1996	50	—	—	—	—	—	—	—	—	—		The Afterparty
"The Afterparty"	1996	—	—	66	—	—	—	—	—	—	—		The Afterparty
"Danger Sign"	2001	61	—	—	—	—	—	—	—	—	—		Non-album singles
"Axel F 2003" (Murphy Brown vs Captain Hollywood)	2003	18	—	—	—	—	—	—	—	—	—		Non-album singles
"Flying High (2003)" (Captain Hollywood pres. Boom Boxx)	2003	44	—	—	—	—	—	—	—	—	—		Non-album singles
"—" denotes items which were not released in that country or failed to chart.

== Sources ==
- Büchelmeier, Gerald (Jan 1993). "Captain Hollywood: Nr.1-RAP AUS NÜRNBERG". Bravo Magazine. 2: 21.
