= Eurodance =

Music genre

- Other names: Euro-NRG
- Stylistic origins: House; techno; Hi-NRG; pop; Eurodisco; hip-hop; disco
- Cultural origins: 1980s, Europe

Other topics
- List of artists/songs

Eurodance (sometimes referred to as Euro-NRG) is a genre of electronic dance music that originated in the late 1980s in Western Europe. It combines many elements of rap, techno and Eurodisco. This genre of music is heavily influenced by the use of rich vocals, sometimes with rapped verses. This, combined with cutting-edge synthesizers, strong bass rhythm and melodic hooks, establishes the core foundation of Eurodance music.

== Characteristics ==
Eurodance songs are typically created by independent groups of European producers, accompanied by hired singers and rappers who serve as frontmen for these groups. These frontmen are often English-speaking performers of color from the United States and United Kingdom. Eurodance fuses late-1980s hip-hop and electronic dance music. Among dance music styles, Eurodance takes particular influence from disco, Hi-NRG and techno. Eurodance combines these elements in a way meant for chart appeal, with producers utilizing pop-inspired melodies and structure and focusing more on creating popular singles rather than albums.

The music of Eurodance is characterized by combining dance beats with vocal hooks, which often serve as the melody. Similar to pop music, Eurodance songs are arranged in verse-chorus structures, with the verses often performed by male rappers and the chorus often performed by female singers. Instrumentation is driven by melodic synthesizers and simple and syncopated bass lines forming the harmony. Drum machines are set to a four-to-the-floor beat between 120 and 150 beats per minute, with a bass drum on each beat and a quiet snare on the second and fourth beats. Musicologist Nico Thom describes the lyrics as "characteristically hedonistic", being simplistic and often revolving around romance and partying. He also describes the production as heavily condensed, which he says leads to a "compact, superficial listening experience".

== Etymology ==
During its initial inception, the Eurodance genre was referred to as dancefloor or dance music. Compilation albums started using the Eurodance term after the genre's peak popularity in the mid-1990s, with one of the first being Interhit Records' DMA Dance Vol. 1: Eurodance (1995). The term Eurodance uses the prefix Euro-, a commonly used prefix within popular music among European and American journalists and the international music industry denoting the genre's European origins. Eurodance shares the prefix with Eurodisco, Eurobeat, and Europop, although the terms have different connotations among different writers. The term Eurodance refers to a specific genre of electronic dance music that originated from Europe in the late-1980s and 1990s. Both Eurodance and Eurodisco shared similar cultural contexts and used electronic production, but Eurodisco predates Eurodance by two decades. Both Eurodance and Europop use superficial and catchy songwriting, but Eurodance is exclusively dance music, unlike Europop.

== History ==
=== Background ===
Eurodance music originated in the late 1980s in central Europe, especially in Germany, where rave parties were becoming popular. By 1987, a German party scene was started, based on the well established Chicago house sound and Belgian new beat. The following year saw acid house making a significant impact on popular consciousness in Germany and central Europe as it had in England. In 1989, German DJs Westbam and Dr. Motte established the Ufo Club, an illegal party venue, and co-founded the Love Parade. The parade first occurred in July 1989, when 150 people took to the streets in Berlin. It was conceived as a political demonstration for peace and international understanding through love and music. On 9 November 1989, the Berlin Wall fell; free underground techno parties mushroomed in East Berlin, and a rave scene comparable to that in the UK was established. East German DJ Paul van Dyk has remarked that the techno-based rave scene was a major force in re-establishing social connections between East and West Germany during the unification period. In the same year, German producers Michael Münzing and Luca Anzilotti (under the pseudonyms Benito Benites and John "Virgo" Garrett III) formed the Snap! project in Frankfurt. Snap! songs combined imported hip-hop and soul vocals adding rhythm by using computer technology and mixing electronic sounds, bass and drums, mainly house music. By doing so a new genre was born: Eurodance.

=== Rise and fall ===
Snap!'s first single, "The Power", released in 1990, reached number one in the Netherlands, Spain, Switzerland and the United Kingdom, and it helped to raise awareness of the genre within Europe. In the following years, other Eurodance acts formed in Frankfurt, including Jam and Spoon, Intermission and Culture Beat. After the breakthrough single "Rhythm is a Dancer" by Snap! in 1992, new groups started to appear all over Europe, mainly in Belgium, the Netherlands and Italy. From 1992 until the genre's decline in popularity after 1995, the sound became increasingly NRG-oriented, leading to songs raising in beats per minute up to 150. Some of the genre's defining songs in this period, dubbed as the "golden era" of Eurodance, are "It's My Life" by Dr. Alban in 1992, "No Limit" by Belgian-Dutch group 2 Unlimited in 1993, "What Is Love" by Haddaway in the same year, "Cotton Eye Joe" by Rednex in 1994, "Another Night" by Real McCoy and "Scatman (Ski-Ba-Bop-Ba-Dop-Bop)" by Scatman John in the same year.

By 1995, Eurodance dominated European charts with 5 singles in the top 10 of the singles charts. Despite its success, many observers within the music industry said that the Eurodance sound had to change or die, and Eurodance producers and singers started to follow different paths and different sounds, such as happy hardcore and house music, but not all the groups followed this trend immediately. Notably, the group 2 Unlimited wanted to remain within Eurodance sounds in order to remain chartbusters, although the producer De Coster predicted a retreat from a pop-like to a more club-like sound.

In the late 1990s, the classic Eurodance sound gradually morphed into progressive house.

In 2023, a parody song titled Planet of the Bass by comedian Kyle Gordon sparked renewed interest in the genre.

Amid 2024, an influx of videos on social media platforms would be uploaded under the guise of far-right propaganda, using snippets taken from songs of the genre, called "Save Europe". This primarily adheres to TikTok.

== Popularity ==
=== In Europe ===
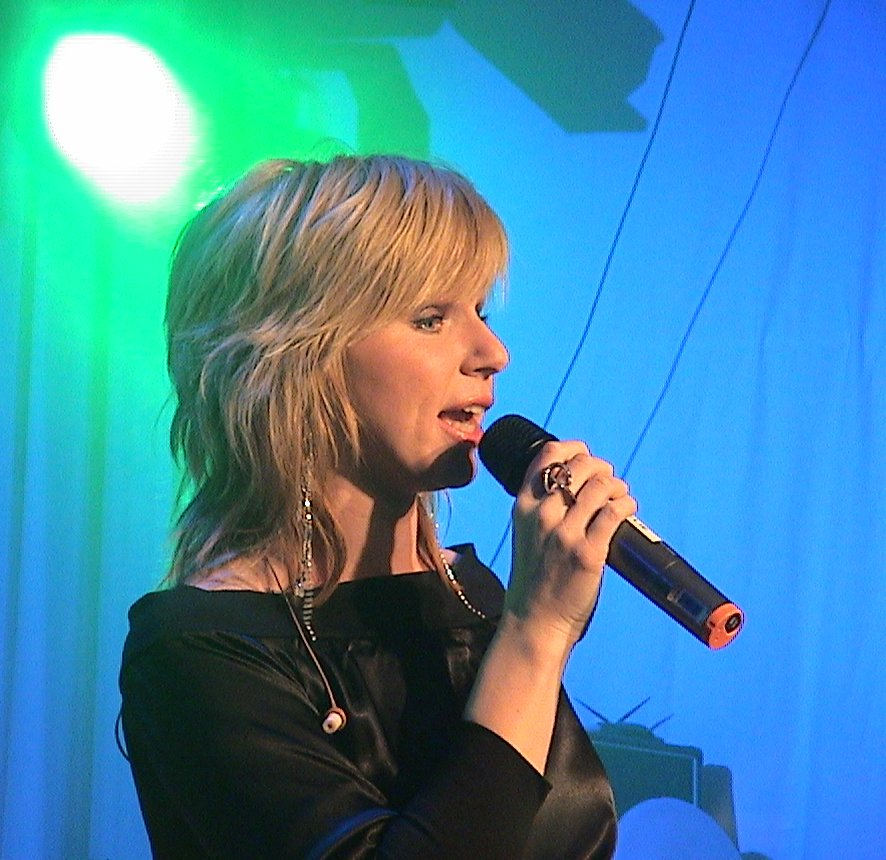
Pandora in Karlstad, Sweden, in 2004

From the early to mid-1990s, Eurodance was popular in Europe; the style received extensive airplay on radio stations and television shows, resulting in many singles appearing in the charts. Technotronic from Belgium had hits with "Pump Up the Jam" and "Get Up" (featuring Ya Kid K).

By 1996, the popularity of this genre had started to decline. From then, the classic Eurodance sound gradually morphed into progressive house. By 1997 and towards the end of the millennium house and trance music increased popularity over Eurodance in Europe's commercial, chart-oriented dance records. In the early 2000s, the mainstream music industry in Europe moved away from Eurodance in favour of other styles of dance music such as nu-disco, electro house, dance-pop and R&B.

==== United Kingdom ====
After Cappella's Gianfranco Bortolotti set up Media Records in Brescia, northern Italy to release his 'commercial European dance music' (a set-up which included fifteen studios featuring various production teams working almost non-stop on a huge number of records) he decided to take the label into other markets and set up a UK office in the UK. Run by Peter Pritchard and featuring many records by Stu Allan's British Eurodance act Clock, this record company would eventually turn into hard house label Nukleuz (known for its DJ Nation releases).

As Media turned into Nukleuz, it would fall to All Around the World Productions to be the label in the 21st century which was more likely to release Eurodance tracks in the UK than other, with its Clubland TV music channel still having regular blocks of Eurodance videos in 2020 (though extending its scope to include hits by David Guetta as well as Cascada and Scooter)

=== North America ===
==== Canada ====
During the 1990s, Eurodance became popular in Canada, which produced its own variant called Candance (although it was mostly referred to as "Eurodance" or "dance music"). Eurodance received significant airplay on radio stations in the Greater Toronto Area such as Power 88.5, Energy 108 and Hot 103.5. Montreal was also a major Eurodance market, with MC Mario's famous radio show on Mix 96, called Party Mix and Bouge de là, a popular TV show on MusiquePlus. Eurodance featured prominently on Electric Circus, a dance-party TV show broadcast nationally in English and French versions. Beginning in mid-1992, Eurodance began to dominate the RPM dance chart in Canada, with acts such as 2 Unlimited, Snap!, Captain Hollywood Project, Culture Beat, Haddaway, Whigfield, each reaching number-one.

From approximately 1992 to 2000, Canadian acts such as Capital Sound, Love Inc., Jacynthe and Emjay had success with the Eurodance sound. The Toronto sound was more pop-oriented, while the Montreal one was more house-oriented.

==== United States ====
Compared with its dominance of European charts, Eurodance found more limited traction on US's pop radio, occasionally breaking through in small amounts amid the era's teen pop and nu metal, though the genre fared better on club and dance-chart airplay than on mainstream Top 40.

Compilation albums such as the DMA Dance: Eurodance series (1995–1997) from Interhit Records and Dance Music Authority magazine were popular and helped to define the genre as well as to make it accessible in the U.S. and Canada.

La Bouche's "Be My Lover" became the group's first U.S. top-ten single, peaking at number six on the Hot 100 while also topping the Hot Dance Club Play chart. By contrast, Scatman John's "Scatman (Ski-Ba-Bop-Ba-Dop-Bop)" reached number one in twelve countries but stalled at number 60 on the Hot 100.

== See also ==
- List of Eurodance artists
- List of Eurodance songs

== Sources ==
- Thom, Nico (2017). "The Popularization of Electronic Dance Music: German Artists/Producers and the Eurodance Phenomenon". In Ahlers, Michael; Jacke, Christoph (eds.). Perspectives on German Popular Music. New York: Routledge. pp. 111–115. ISBN 9781472479624.
- Wandler, Heiko (2021). "How Munich and Frankfurt Brought (Electronic) Dance Music to the Top of the International Charts with Eurodisco and Eurodance – and Why Germany Was Not Involved". In Seibt, Oliver; Ringsmut, Martin; Wickström, David-Emil (eds.). Made in Germany: Studies in Popular Music. New York: Routledge. pp. 175–183. ISBN 9780815391784.
