= Crying in the Rain (Culture Beat song) =

Single by Culture Beat

from the album Inside Out
- B-side: "Out of Touch"
- Released: 12 February 1996
- Genre: Eurodance; Eurodisco
- Length: 3:54 (radio edit); 5:38 (extended version)
- Label: Dance Pool
- Songwriters: Doug Laurent; Robert Gerding; Tania Evans; Jay Supreme; GEDO, Doug Laurent; Robert Gerding (Track: 8)
- Producer: Doug Laurent

Culture Beat singles chronology
"Inside Out" (1995)	"Crying in the Rain" (1996)	"Take Me Away" (1996)

Music video
- "Crying in the Rain" on YouTube

Alternative cover
- CD-Maxi - Remixes

"Crying in the Rain" is a song by German Eurodance band Culture Beat, released on 12 February 1996 by Dance Pool as the second single from their third studio album, Inside Out (1995). It was co-written by band members Tania Evans and Jay Supreme with Doug Laurent and Robert Gerding, and produced by Laurent. The single charted in many countries, reaching its best chart positions in Hungary, Germany and Denmark, where it was a top-10 hit. "Crying in the Rain" also reached number-one on the Canadian RPM Dance/Urban chart. The accompanying music video was directed by Oliver Sommer and filmed in Hong Kong, China. A CD maxi-single containing remixes was also released under the name Crying in the Rain Remixes.

== Critical reception ==
Larry Flick from Billboard magazine noted that "Tania Evans smolders on the Culture Beat kicker 'Crying in the Rain'—which is by far the act's most viable bid for pop radio success since 1994's 'Mr. Vain'." Taylor Parkes from Melody Maker was less enthustiastic, saying, "Belgium being probably the only country still interested in Culture Beat." Damien Mendis from Music Week's RM Dance Update gave the song a score of four out of five, remarking its "traditional speedy Euro style with galloping bass, sweeping synths and obligatory energetic rap capturing its catchiness." He concluded, "You'll either love it or hate it." Another Record Mirror editor, James Hamilton, described it as "Tania Evans wailed and gruff J. Supreme muttered Eurodisco".

== Chart performance ==
"Crying in the Rain" was quite successful on the charts in both Canada and Europe, peaking at number-one on the Canadian RPM Dance/Urban chart. In Europe, it made the top 10 in Denmark, Germany and Hungary, where it peaked at number ten, eight and three. The single was also a top-20 hit in Austria, Belgium, Finland and Switzerland, and a top-30 hit in Scotland, Sweden and the United Kingdom, as well as on the Eurochart Hot 100, where it hit number 28. In the UK, "Crying in the Rain" peaked at number 29 in its first week at the UK Singles Chart, on June 9, 1996. In West Asia, it became a top-30 hit in Israel, peaking at number 24 on June 25.

== Track listings ==
- CD single (Germany, 1996)
1. "Crying in the Rain" (Radio Edit) - 3:54
2. "Crying in the Rain" (Not Normal Mix - Special Acoustic Version) - 3:30
- CD maxi-single (Europe, 1996)
1. "Crying in the Rain" (Radio Edit) - 3:54
2. "Crying in the Rain" (Extended Mix) - 5:38
3. "Crying in the Rain" (Doug Laurent Mix) - 6:09
4. "Crying in the Rain" (Brainformed Mix) - 6:54
5. "Crying in the Rain" (Let The Love House 7" Mix) - 3:52
6. "Crying in the Rain" (Sweetbox Funky 7" Mix) - 3:22
7. "Crying in the Rain" (Not Normal Mix) - 3:30
8. "Out of Touch" - 4:08
- CD maxi-single - Remix (Germany, 1996)
1. "Crying in the Rain" (Aboria Euro Radio Mix) - 3:49
2. "Crying in the Rain" (Temple Of Light Mix) - 6:31
3. "Crying in the Rain" (Celvin Rotane Mix) - 6:58
4. "Crying in the Rain" (Stonebridge & Nick Nice Club Mix) - 8:10
5. "Crying in the Rain" (Großer Club Mix) - 7:58
6. "Crying in the Rain" (Jim Clarke Mix) - 5:36
7. "Crying in the Rain" (Aboria Euro 12" Mix) - 6:43
- CD single (France, 1996)
1. "Crying in the Rain" (Aboria Euro Radio) - 3:49
2. "Crying in the Rain" (Aboria Euro Mix) - 6:43
- CD maxi-single 1 (UK, 1996)
1. "Crying in the Rain" (Radio Edit) - 3:54
2. "Mr. Vain" (Mr House) - 6:18
3. "Got to Get It" (Hypnotic Mix) - 7:17
4. "Anything" (Trancemix) - 6:30
- CD maxi-single 2 (UK, 1996)
1. "Crying in the Rain" (Radio Edit) - 3:54
2. "Crying in the Rain" (Extended Mix) - 5:38
3. "Crying in the Rain" (Sweetbox Funky 12" Mix) - 7:13
4. "Crying in the Rain" (Brainformed Mix) - 6:54
5. "Crying in the Rain" (Let The Love House 12" Mix) - 7:01
6. "Crying in the Rain" (Not Normal Mix) - 3:30
- 12" maxi vinyl single (France, 1996)
1. "Crying in the Rain" (Aboria Euro Mix) - 6:43
2. "Crying in the Rain" (Extended Mix) - 5:38
3. "Crying in the Rain" (Radio Edit) - 3:54
- 12" maxi vinyl single - Remix (France, 1996)
1. "Crying in the Rain" (Brainformed Mix) - 6:54
2. "Crying in the Rain" (Sweetbox Funky 7" Mix) - 3:22
3. "Crying in the Rain" (Let The Love House 7" Mix) - 3:52

== Charts ==
=== Weekly charts ===
Chart (1996)	Peak position
Australia (ARIA)	181
Austria (Ö3 Austria Top 40)	14
Belgium (Ultratop 50 Flanders)	14
Belgium (Ultratop 50 Wallonia)	23
Canada Dance/Urban (RPM)	1
Denmark (IFPI)	10
Europe (Eurochart Hot 100)	28
Europe (European Dance Radio)	8
Finland (Suomen virallinen lista)	13
Germany (GfK)	8
Israel (Israeli Singles Chart)	24
Netherlands (Dutch Top 40 Tipparade)	2
Netherlands (Single Top 100)	45
Scottish Singles Sales (Official Charts)	28
Sweden (Sverigetopplistan)	23
Switzerland (Schweizer Hitparade)	16
UK Singles (Official Charts)	29
UK Pop Tip Club Chart (Music Week)	2

=== Year-end charts ===
Chart (1996)	Position
Belgium (Ultratop 50 Flanders)	66
Belgium (Ultratop 50 Wallonia)	83
Germany (Media Control)	61
UK Pop Tip Club Chart (Music Week)	22
