= Serenity (Culture Beat album) =

Studio album by Culture Beat
- Released: 2 June 1993
- Genre: Eurodance
- Length: 64:08
- Label: Dance Pool (Sony)
- Producers: Peter Zweier; Torsten Fenslau

Culture Beat chronology
| Horizon (1991) | Serenity (1993) | The Remix Album (1994) |

Singles from Serenity
- 1. "Mr. Vain" Released: 16 April 1993; 2. "Got to Get It" Released: 13 September 1993; 3. "Anything" Released: 20 December 1993; 4. "World in Your Hands" Released: 28 March 1994; 5. "Adelante!" Released: 20 June 1994

Professional ratings
Review scores
| Source | Rating |
|---|---|
| AllMusic | 3/5 stars |
| Calgary Herald | B+ |
| Robert Christgau | (choice cut) |
| Melody Maker | (mixed) |
| Music Week | 2/5 stars |

Serenity is the second studio album by German Eurodance band Culture Beat, released in 1993. It includes the single "Mr. Vain", which topped the charts across Europe and Australia.

== Background ==
The line-up of Culture Beat changed slightly from their previous album released two years earlier, with Tania Evans becoming the new singer, joining Jay Supreme who remained the rapper. A total of five singles were released from the album: "Mr. Vain", "Got to Get It", "Anything", "World in Your Hands" and "Adelante".

The album won the 1993 Echo award for Most Successful German Album Abroad which is the highest German music industry award. It went on to sell almost two million copies worldwide.

== Critical reception ==
AllMusic editor William Cooper opined that "Serenity is an okay listen, albeit a repetitious one. "Got to Get It" is a virtual rewrite of "Mr. Vain", and the beat-heavy tracks "World in Your Hands" and "The Other Side of Me" are unremarkable but competent and entertaining. Serenity may lack substance, but the album should please fans of pleasant, non-threatening dance music." James Muretich from Calgary Herald commented, "Culture Beat has co-ruled the dance clubs with hit after hit after hit recently and Serenity gathers them together, including its recent "Mr. Vain" smash, adds some new tunes and, presto, it's dance party time. A tight, techno, soulful serving of dance grooves, raps and singing, Culture Beat easily ranks a notch above its beats-per-minute competitors." Alan Jones from Music Week wrote that "Germany's latest hitmakers make their album debut, which simply proves the huge debt they owe to fellow countrymen Snap." He felt that "there's little of distinction here with none of the tracks sounding likely to emulate the singles success of "Mr. Vain"."

== Track listing ==
Serenity track listing
| # | Title | Length |
|---|---|---|
| 1. | "Serenity (Prolog)" | 2:16 |
| 2. | "Mr. Vain" | 5:37 |
| 3. | "Got to Get It" | 5:21 |
| 4. | "World in Your Hands" | 5:33 |
| 5. | "Adelante!" | 5:38 |
| 6. | "Rocket to the Moon" | 5:47 |
| 7. | "Anything" | 6:24 |
| 8. | "Key to Your Heart" | 4:09 |
| 9. | "The Other Side of Me" | 4:52 |
| 10. | "The Hurt" | 4:15 |
| 11. | "Mother Earth" | 6:11 |
| 12. | "Serenity (Epilog)" | 7:51 |
| 13. | "ID Tania" | 0:06 |
| 14. | "ID Jay" | 0:09 |

== Charts ==
=== Weekly charts ===
Weekly chart performance for Serenity
| Chart (1993–1994) | Peak position |
|---|---|
| Australian Albums (ARIA) | 5 |
| Austrian Albums (Ö3 Austria) | 7 |
| Canada Top Albums/CDs (RPM) | 38 |
| Dutch Albums (Album Top 100) | 12 |
| European Albums (European Top 100 Albums) | 15 |
| Finnish Albums (Suomen virallinen lista) | 2 |
| French Albums (SNEP) | 25 |
| German Albums (Offizielle Top 100) | 8 |
| Hungarian Albums (MAHASZ) | 4 |
| Norwegian Albums (VG-lista) | 10 |
| Swedish Albums (Sverigetopplistan) | 4 |
| Swiss Albums (Schweizer Hitparade) | 8 |
| UK Albums (Official Charts) | 13 |

=== Year-end charts ===
1993 year-end chart performance for Serenity
| Chart (1993) | Position |
|---|---|
| European Albums (European Top 100 Albums) | 59 |
| German Albums (Offizielle Top 100) | 28 |
| Swiss Albums (Schweizer Hitparade) | 30 |

1994 year-end chart performance for Serenity
| Chart (1994) | Position |
|---|---|
| Australian Albums (ARIA) | 51 |
| Dutch Albums (Album Top 100) | 58 |
| German Albums (Offizielle Top 100) | 66 |

== Certifications ==
Certifications for Serenity
| Region | Certification | Certified units/sales |
|---|---|---|
| Australia (ARIA) | Gold | 35,000^{^} |
| Austria (IFPI Austria) | Gold | 25,000^{*} |
| Finland (Musiikkituottajat) | Gold | 25,000 |
| France (SNEP) | Gold | 100,000^{*} |
| Germany (BVMI) | Gold | 250,000^{^} |
| Netherlands (NVPI) | Gold | 50,000^{^} |
| Sweden (GLF) | Gold | 50,000^{^} |
| Switzerland (IFPI Switzerland) | Gold | 25,000^{^} |
| United Kingdom (BPI) | Gold | 100,000^{^} |
^{*} Sales figures based on certification alone.^{^} Shipments figures based on certification alone.
