= Der Erdbeermund =

Single by Culture Beat featuring Jo van Nelsen

from the album Horizon
- Released: June 24, 1989
- Genre: Eurodance; house
- Length: 4:05
- Label: CBS; CBS Dance Pool; Epic
- Songwriters: Jens Zimmermann; Nosie Katzmann; Torsten Fenslau; François Villon
- Producers: Jens Zimmermann; Torsten Fenslau

Culture Beat featuring Jo van Nelsen singles chronology
"Der Erdbeermund" (1989)	"No Deeper Meaning" (1991)

Music video
- "Der Erdbeermund" on YouTube

"Der Erdbeermund" (in English: "The Strawberry Mouth") is a song recorded by German Eurodance band Culture Beat. It was released in 1989 by CBS and Epic Records as the band's debut single from the studio album, Horizon (1991). Written by Torsten Fenslau with Jens Zimmermann and Nosie Katzmann after words by Paul Zech (as a pastiche of François Villon), it features a spoken vocal in German by Jo van Nelsen. "Der Erdbeermund" peaked at number 11 on the West German singles chart and number 48 on the Eurochart Hot 100.

== Background ==
German disc jockey and music producer Torsten Fenslau, who initially had a desire for becoming an architect, had been working as a DJ at the Frankfurt nightclub Dorian Gray for 11 years, when he decided to form Culture Beat with his friends Jens Zimmermann and Peter Zweier. After recording and having club success with a song Fenslau had made with songwriter Nosie Katzmann, called "Alone (It's Me)", he asked Katzmann if he could listen to some more tracks the songwriter had written. One of these tracks caught Fenslau's attention - a song called "423211". He then asked his production partner Zimmermann to re-record the track with a more club-oriented bass drum and "Der Erdbeermund" was created.

After the instrumental was finished, Katzmann didn't have time to record his vocals on it, so initially Fenslau used a reading by German actor Klaus Kinski of the poem "Eine verliebte Ballade für Ysabeau d'Aussigny” ("A Romantic Ballad for Ysabeau d’Aussigny") by German poet Paul Zech in the style of French poet François Villon. Later the spoken poem was re-recorded with Jo van Nelsen. The gay clubs first noticed the song, and they helped it a lot to become a big hit. Jo van Nelsen was also well known in the Frankfurt-based gay community. Versions of the song in English and French were also released, titled "Cherry Lips" and "Les lèvres cerises", respectively. An instrumental version was also a club hit in the United Kingdom, where it reached number 55 on the UK Singles Chart. "Cherry Lips" was a top-10 hit on the US Billboard dance chart.

== Critical reception ==
Bill Coleman from Billboard magazine wrote about the English version of the song, "Spacious house-based track from Germany soothes with each listen. Big on import, various mixes in domestic release should secure club interest." Ernest Hardy from Cash Box commented, "As if a mad poet stood up on the dancefloor and started sprouting his obsessions. This German concoction (an English vocal version is presented as well) manages to be both very artsy and danceable at the same time. The soft roar of the crowd that opens the track at first sounds like a gust of wind, then there's a soft tinkling set against a drum machine; the ongoing contrast of the mechanical with the soft, the harsh with the pretty is what makes 'Lips' work."

== Track listing ==
- 7" single, West Germany (1989)
1. "Der Erdbeermund" — 4:05
2. "Der Erdbeermund" (Instrumental) — 4:05
- 12" single, West Germany (1989)
1. "Der Erdbeermund" (Get Into Magic Mix) — 8:09
2. "Der Erdbeermund" (Instrumental Magic) — 8:09
- 12" single (Remix), West Germany (1989)
1. "Der Erdbeermund" (Magic Remix) — 6:55
2. "Der Erdbeermund" (Magic Intro Mix) — 8:05

== Charts ==
=== Weekly charts ===
Chart (1989–1990)	Peak position
Europe (Eurochart Hot 100)	48
UK Singles (OCC)	55
West Germany (Media Control Charts)	11

=== Year-end charts ===
Chart (1990)	Position
UK Club Chart (Record Mirror)	44
