= No Deeper Meaning =

Single by Culture Beat

from the album Horizon
- B-side: "Remix"
- Released: 10 June 1991
- Genre: Eurodance; hip-house
- Length: 4:00
- Label: Dance Pool
- Songwriters: Jay Supreme; Nosie Katzmann
- Producers: Jens Zimmermann; Torsten Fenslau

Culture Beat singles chronology
"Der Erdbeermund" (1989)	"No Deeper Meaning" (1991)	"Mr. Vain" (1993)

Audio video
- "No Deeper Meaning" on YouTube

"No Deeper Meaning" is a song written by Jay Supreme and Nosie Katzmann, and recorded by German Eurodance band Culture Beat. It was released in June 1991, by label Dance Pool, as the fourth and final single from their first studio album, Horizon (1991). The female vocals are performed by Lana Earl. A CD maxi with new remixes was also available, but it was marketed at the same time as the other media. The song reached number four in the Netherlands and number nine in Portugal. Outside Europe, it charted at number three on the RPM Dance/Urban chart in Canada. Lyrically it tells about a woman who goes to a nightclub and doesn't want to start a relationship, she just wants to dance. The chorus samples the 1983 song "Change" by British new wave band Tears for Fears.

== Critical reception ==
Larry Flick from Billboard magazine wrote that here, the German act "returns to the festive hip-house sound of earlier hits." He called it "spirited", and added that A-side mixes "should entice mainstreamers, while more adventurous, acid-splashed versions on the flip could generate alternative buzz." Mitchell May from Chicago Tribune named the song a highlight of the Horizon album.

== Track listings ==
- CD maxi-single (Europe, 1991)
1. "No Deeper Meaning" (club mix) – 6:40
2. "No Deeper Meaning" (airplay mix) – 4:00
3. "No Deeper Meaning" (house mix) – 7:00
- CD maxi-single remix (Germany, 1991)
1. "No Deeper Meaning" (51 West 52 Street mix) – 6:55
2. "No Deeper Meaning" (Technology mix) – 4:04
3. "No Deeper Meaning" (Departure mix) – 1:58

== Charts ==
=== Weekly charts ===
Chart (1991)	Peak position
Australia (ARIA)	126
Belgium (Ultratop 50 Flanders)	30
Canada Dance/Urban (RPM)	3
Finland (Suomen virallinen lista)	19
Netherlands (Dutch Top 40)	4
Netherlands (Single Top 100)	5
Portugal (AFP)	9

=== Year-end charts ===
Chart (1991)	Position
Netherlands (Dutch Top 40)	65
Netherlands (Single Top 100)	88
