= Inside Out (Culture Beat album) =

Studio album by Culture Beat
- Released: 3 November 1995
- Recorded: April – August 1995
- Genre: Trance
- Label: Dance Pool 481404 2, Sony
- Producer: Doug. Laurent, Perky Park, N. Tielmann, Q-Swap, T. Uhrmacher, Cyborg, F. Bülow, P. Gräber

Culture Beat chronology
The Remix Album (1994)	Inside Out (1995)	Metamorphosis (1998)

Inside Out is the third studio album released by the German Eurodance group Culture Beat. The record was released in 1995, and there were four singles released from the album in total. The "Inside Out" album is also the last album to be released with the Jay Supreme & Tania Evans line up. This is also the first album not to be produced by Torsten Fenslau, who died in 1993 while promoting Culture Beat's music.

== Track listing ==
1. "Intro" - 2:24
2. "Walk the Same Line" (Extended Version) - 5:58
3. "Get It Right" - 4:12
4. "Troubles" - 5:28
5. "Nothing Can Come..." - 4:55
6. "Take Me Away" - 5:25
7. "Miracle" - 5:35
8. "Inside Out" (Extended Version) - 5:55
9. "Crying in the Rain" - 4:37
10. "Do I Have You ?" - 5:30
11. "Under My Skin" - 5:00
12. "Worth the Wait" - 5:07
13. "In the Mood" - 5:33
14. "Inside Out" (Not Normal Mix) - 2:28

== Credits ==
Inside Out was executive produced by Frank Fenslau
Producer [Assistant Post-production] – Bernhard Bouché
Producer [Post-production Performed] – Stephan M. Sprenger
Post-produced at Catapult Studios Karlsruhe using Prosoniq Products sonicWORX Software

Vocals – Jay Supreme, Tania Evans
