= Take Me Away (Culture Beat song) =

Single by Culture Beat

from the album Inside Out
- B-side: "Hamana"
- Released: 14 June 1996
- Recorded: 1995
- Genre: Eurodance
- Length: 3:55 (radio edit); 6:59 (extended version)
- Label: Dance Pool
- Songwriters: Cyborg; Jay Supreme; Jörg Wagner DJ; Vernon
- Producers: Cyborg (Tracks: 1,2,3,4,5,6); Nino Tielman; Peter Gräber (Track: 7)

Culture Beat singles chronology
"Crying in the Rain" (1996)	"Take Me Away" (1996)	"Walk the Same Line" (1996)

Music video
- "Take Me Away" on YouTube

Alternative cover
- CD-Maxi - Remixes

"Take Me Away" is a song recorded by German Eurodance band Culture Beat, released in June 1996 by Dance Pool as the third single from their third studio album, Inside Out (1995). The song was co-written by band member Jay Supreme and became a hit in many countries, particularly in Finland where it reached number six. It was also a top-20 hit in Belgium, and a top-30 hit in Germany, Iceland and Sweden. Outside Europe, the song peaked at number three in Israel, number four on the Canadian Dance/Urban chart and number 39 on the US Hot Dance Music/Maxi-Singles Sales chart. The accompanying music video was directed by Nikolas Mann and filmed in London. It first aired in September 1996. A CD maxi with new remixes was also available, but it was marketed at the same time as the other media.

== Critical reception ==
Shawnee Smith from Billboard magazine gave the song a mixed review, saying that while the song "hasn't moved far beyond that formula [of 'Mr. Vain']", lead singer Tania Evans is "quite the charmer, and producer/writer Cyborg has a way with hooks that is hard to resist." Simon Price from Melody Maker wrote, "When Culture Beat's Tania Evans, in her saddest Rose Royce (Euro rhyming slang), sings, I...I hope I am your type, it says more to me about party fears and disco paranoia than The Smiths 'How Soon Is Now' ever did."

== Track listings ==
- CD maxi-single (Europe, 1996)
1. "Take Me Away" (Radio Edit) – 3:55
2. "Take Me Away" (Extended Mix) – 6:59
3. "Take Me Away" (Doom Mix) – 6:02
4. "Take Me Away" (Sweetbox Hotpants Mix) – 6:02
5. "Take Me Away" (Aboria Euro Mix) – 6:11
6. "Take Me Away" (Special A Capella Version (Not Normal Mix)) – 3:23
7. "Hamana" - 5:21
- CD maxi-single - Remix (Germany, 1996)
1. "Take Me Away" (M'N'S Gazelled Up Mix) – 7:37
2. "Take Me Away" (M'N'S Full On Vocal Mix) – 6:59
3. "Take Me Away" (GEDO Mix) – 6:16
4. "Take Me Away" (Doug Laurent Mix) – 6:10
5. "Take Me Away" (Tokapi's House Of Summer Mix) – 5:37
6. "Take Me Away" (Hard To Be Hip Mix) – 5:57
- CD maxi-single (USA, 1997)
1. "Take Me Away" (Radio Edit) – 3:37
2. "Take Me Away" (Aboria Euro Radio) – 3:41
3. "Take Me Away" (Sweetbox Hotpants Radio Edit) – 3:33
4. "Take Me Away" (Extended Mix) – 6:55
5. "Take Me Away" (Aboria Euro Mix) – 6:07
6. "Take Me Away" (Sweetbox Hotpants Mix) – 5:58
7. "Take Me Away" (M'N's Gazelled Up Mix) – 7:21
8. "Take Me Away" (Doug Laurent Mix) – 6:07

== Charts ==
Weekly chart performance for "Take Me Away"
Chart (1996–1997)	Peak position
Austria (Ö3 Austria Top 40)	39
Belgium (Ultratop 50 Flanders)	15
Belgium (Ultratop 50 Wallonia)	28
Canada Dance/Urban (RPM)	4
Europe (Eurochart Hot 100)	59
Europe (European Dance Radio)	14
Finland (Suomen virallinen lista)	6
Germany (GfK)	26
Iceland (Íslenski Listinn Topp 40)	29
Israel (Israeli Singles Chart)	3
Netherlands (Dutch Top 40 Tipparade)	3
Netherlands (Single Top 100)	48
Scottish Singles Sales (Official Charts)	59
Sweden (Sverigetopplistan)	24
Switzerland (Schweizer Hitparade)	33
UK Singles (Official Charts)	52
UK Pop Tip Club Chart (Music Week)	9
US Bubbling Under Hot 100 Singles (Billboard)	11
US Maxi-Singles Sales (Billboard)	39
