= Culture Beat =

German musical group

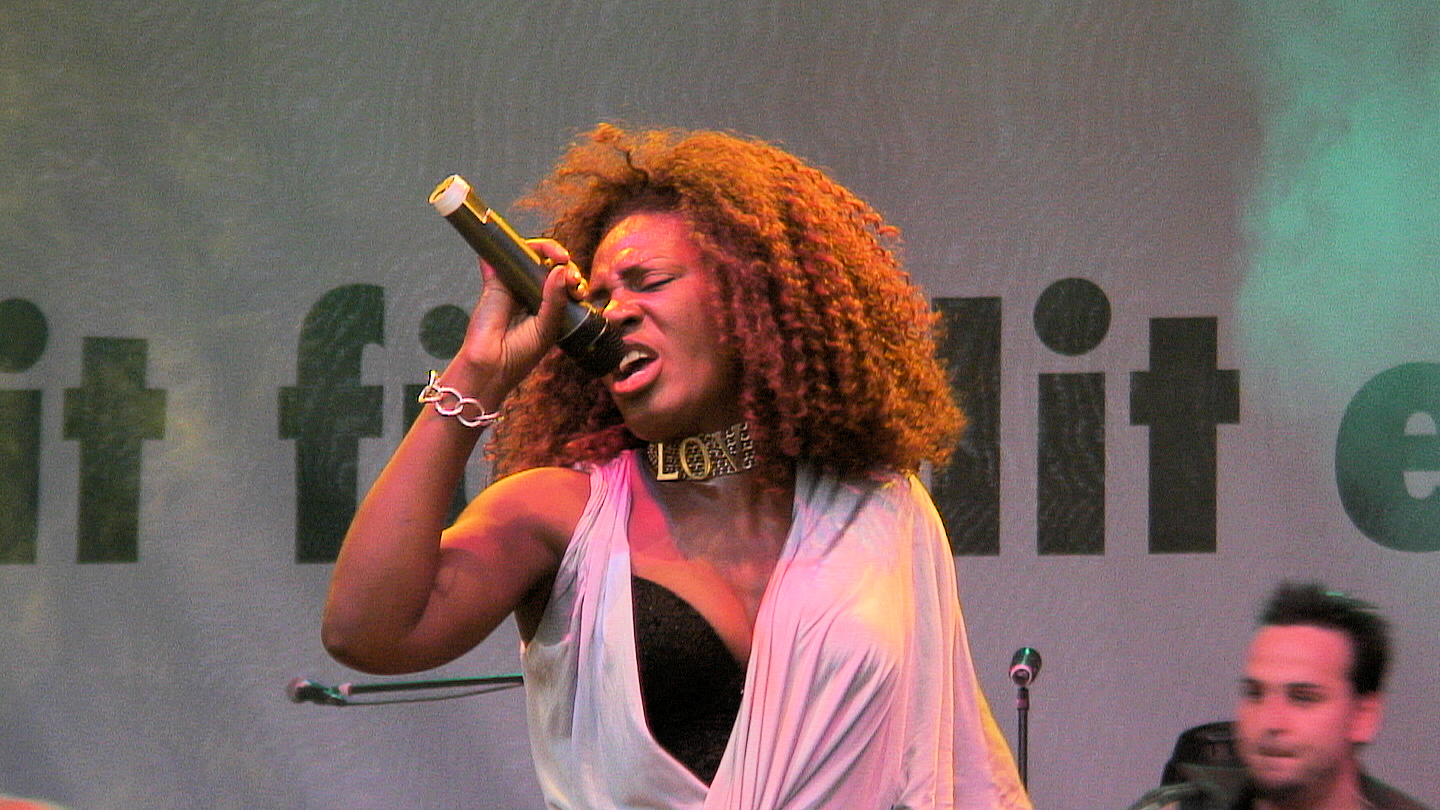
- Jacky Sangster of Culture Beat, 2007

Background information
- Origin: Frankfurt, Germany
- Genres: Eurodance
- Years active: 1989–present
- Members: Frank Fenslau; Peter Gräber; Jacky Sangster; MC 4T
- Past members: Lana Earl (1989–1993); Tania Evans (1993–1997); Torsten Fenslau (1989–1993); Juergen Katzmann (1989–1995); Kim Sanders (1998–1999); Jay Supreme (1989–1997); Jens Zimmermann (1989–1991); Peter Zweier (1989–1994)

Culture Beat is a German Eurodance project formed in 1989 by Torsten Fenslau. The band has gone through a number of lineup changes over the years, achieving the most success whilst fronted by British singer Tania Evans and American rapper Jay Supreme. Their 1993 single "Mr. Vain" was a no. 1 hit in eleven European countries, and the group claims to have sold more than 10 million records worldwide.

== History ==
=== Origins and formation ===
Torsten Fenslau, who initially wanted to become an architect, had been working as a DJ at the Frankfurt nightclub Dorian Gray since 1982 (and remained for 11 years), when in 1989 he decided to form Culture Beat with his friends Jens Zimmermann and Peter Zweier.

=== 1989–1991: Horizon ===
Their first single, the track "Der Erdbeermund", with a spoken vocal in German by Jo van Nelsen, peaked at number 11 on the German singles chart. Versions in English and French were also released (titled "Cherry Lips" and "Les lèvres cerises", respectively). An instrumental version was also played in clubs in the United Kingdom, where it reached number 55.

Shortly afterwards, Culture Beat recruited New Jersey-born rapper Jay Supreme and singer Lana Earl to front the act. While the second single "I Like You" reached number 22 in the Netherlands, their fourth single "No Deeper Meaning" managed to reach as high as number 4 in the Netherlands and number 3 on the Canadian RPM Dance Chart. They released their first album, Horizon, in 1991 which went with only minor success.

=== 1993–1994: Serenity and international success ===
Lana was replaced by British singer Tania Evans in 1993, and the act took a harder Eurodance sound. "Mr. Vain" became their biggest hit to date, reaching number one in 13 countries including Germany, Australia and the United Kingdom. It was also their first mainstream hit in the United States, peaking at number 17 on the Billboard Hot 100. The single was certified three times Gold in Germany for selling over 750,000 units, it also managed to reach a Gold status in several other countries including US.

Subsequent singles "Got to Get It" and "Anything" were also pan-European hits, and their second album Serenity was awarded at the ECHO award for being the Best-selling German Act Abroad, with more than two million copies sold. This also got Torsten Fenslau nominated in the same year at the Echo for being the Best Producer of the Year, who also walked away as a winner.

On 6 November 1993, Culture Beat's founder Torsten Fenslau was killed in a car accident in Messel (district of Darmstadt) aged 29. His brother Frank took over the act as a manager.

=== 1995–1996: Inside Out ===
The group returned the act in 1995 with a third album called Inside Out, preceded by a single of the same title "Inside Out" which reached number 5 in Germany and number 32 in the UK. A total of four singles were released from the album. Inside Out is the latest album released by Jay Supreme and Tania Evans. This is also the first album not produced by Torsten Fenslau.

=== 1997–1998: Major changes and Metamorphosis ===
In 1997, Frank Fenslau decided to take Culture Beat in a different musical direction diverging the act from the Eurodance sound into a more commercial pop sound. He also replaced Tania with Kim Sanders, who had previously scored a hit with "Impossible" by Captain Hollywood Project. Jay Supreme remained with the act for a short time after Tania's departure, but during recording of the next album he decided to leave the group and the few rap vocals on the next album were produced by rapper Next Up. Although, in 1998, the album Metamorphosis managed to reach number 12 at home, it was a minor chart success as it remained in the top 20 of the album chart for only four weeks, and spent overall 10 weeks appearing on the chart.

=== 2001–present: Singles and present status ===
Three years later, Jacky Sangster replaced Kim as the fourth female lead singer for Culture Beat. The single called "Insanity" was released in 2001 which flopped in Germany; however, reached number 1 in Israel. In 2003, to commemorate ten years since the release of the group's biggest hit, a new version of "Mr. Vain" was issued in Germany and reached number 7 in the singles chart. In 2004, a Greatest Hits package was released ahead of a planned new album with Jacky as vocalist called "Obsession", but was canceled before "Can't Go on Like This (No No)" was released. This single had minor success as well. "Your Love" was released in 2008, and is Culture Beat's most recent single to date. Jacky and a male rapper known by the stage name MC 4T (according to the official website) have performed as Culture Beat since 2003 and continue to perform at different 90's revival venues around the world.

In January 2013, a compilation album was released, "The Loungin' Side of", which contains acoustic and lounge versions of hits taken from Inside Out and Metamorphosis.

== Band members ==
- Torsten Fenslau – keyboards and programming (1989–1993, died 1993)
- Lana Earl – vocals, keyboards and programming (1989–1993)
- Juergen Katzmann – guitars, keyboards and programming (1989–1995)
- Jay Supreme – rapper and vocalist (1989–1998)
- Jens Zimmermann – keyboards and programming (1989–1991)
- Peter Zweier – keyboards and programming (1989–1994)
- Tania Evans – vocals (1993–1997)
- Frank Fenslau – keyboards and programming (1994–)
- Kim Sanders – vocals (1998–1999)
- Next Up – rapper (1998) (rapper on two songs on Metamorphosis : "Pray for Redemption" and "Language of Love".)
- Jacky Sangster – vocals (2001–)
- MC 4T – rapper (2003–)

== Discography ==
=== Studio albums ===
Title	Album details	Peak chart positions									Certifications
Title	Album details	GER	AUS	AUT	FIN	NLD	NOR	SWE	SWI	UK	Certifications
Horizon	Released: 8 March 1991; Label: Epic; Formats: CD, cassette, vinyl	—	150	—	—	—	—	—	—	—	
Serenity	Released: 2 June 1993; Label: Dance Pool; Formats: CD, cassette, vinyl	8	5	7	2	12	10	4	8	13	BVMI: Gold; ARIA: Gold; BPI: Gold; GLF: Gold; IFPI AUT: Gold; IFPI FIN: Gold; IFPI SWI: Gold; SNEP: Gold
Inside Out	Released: 3 November 1995; Label: Dance Pool; Formats: CD, cassette, vinyl	22	142	34	33	91	—	—	27	—	
Metamorphosis	Released: 19 June 1998; Label: Columbia; Formats: CD, cassette, vinyl	12	—	—	—	—	—	—	37	—	
"—" denotes releases that did not chart or were not released.

=== Compilation albums ===
- The Remix Album (1994)
- Best of Culture Beat (2001)

=== Singles ===
Title	Year	Peak chart positions										Certifications	Album
Title	Year	GER	AUS	AUT	BEL (FLA)	FRA	NLD	SWE	SWI	UK	US	Certifications	Album
"Der Erdbeermund"	1989	11	—	—	—	—	—	—	—	55	—		Horizon
"I Like You"	1990	30	164	—	40	—	22	—	—	96	(56) *Airplay		Horizon
"Tell Me That You Wait"	1991	—	180	—	—	—	—	—	—	109	—		Horizon
"No Deeper Meaning"	1991	—	126	—	30	—	5	—	—	—	—		Horizon
"Mr. Vain"	1993	1	1	1	1	3	1	2	1 (Note: "Mr. Vain Remix" peaked at number 10 in Switzerland.)	1	17	BVMI: 2× Platinum; ARIA: Platinum; BPI: Gold; GLF: Gold; IFPI AUT: Gold; IFPI SWI: Gold; RIAA: Gold	Serenity
"Got to Get It"	1993	4	7	7	1	10	2	5	7	4	107	BVMI: Gold; ARIA: Gold	Serenity
"Anything"	1993	4	12	3	5	4	6	15	7	5	—	BVMI: Gold; ARIA: Gold	Serenity
"World in Your Hands"	1994	18	57	20	29	42	13	—	29	20	—		Serenity
"Adelante"	1994	—	—	—	—	—	—	—	—	—	—		Serenity
"Inside Out"	1995	5	62	10	14	46	30	23	11	32	122	BVMI: Gold	Inside Out
"Crying in the Rain"	1996	8	181	14	14	—	45	23	16	29	—		Inside Out
"Take Me Away"	1996	26	—	39	15	—	48	24	33	52	111		Inside Out
"Walk the Same Line"	1996	64	—	38	30	—	—	40	—	—	—		Inside Out
"Pay No Mind"	1998	27	—	37	—	—	—	—	—	—	—		Metamorphosis
"Rendez-Vous"	1998	53	—	38	—	88	—	48	—	—	—		Metamorphosis
"You Belong"	1998	77	—	—	—	—	—	—	—	—	—		Metamorphosis
"Insanity"	2001	66	—	—	—	—	—	—	—	—	—		Singles only
"Mr. Vain Recall"	2003	7	—	8	—	—	66	30	46	51	—		Singles only
"Can't Go on Like This (No No)"	2004	—	—	—	—	—	—	—	—	—	—		Singles only
"Your Love"	2008	—	—	—	—	—	—	—	—	—	—		Singles only
"Have Yourself a Merry Little Christmas"	2017	—	—	—	—	—	—	—	—	—	—		Singles only
"—" denotes releases that did not chart

== See also ==
- List of Billboard number-one dance hits
- List of artists who reached number one on the U.S. dance chart
