= Horizon (Culture Beat album) =

Studio album by Culture Beat
- Released: 8 March 1991
- Recorded: 1989–1990
- Studio: paraDOX Studios
- Label: Dance Pool 467962 2
- Producer: Jens Zimmermann, Torsten Fenslau

Culture Beat chronology
Horizon (1991)	Serenity (1993)

Professional ratings
Review scores
Source	Rating
AllMusic	2/5 stars
Chicago Tribune	2.5/4 stars

Horizon is the debut album by German group Culture Beat. It was released on 8 March 1991 by Dance Pool. The album featured their first hit, "No Deeper Meaning", which reached No. 5 in the Netherlands.

== Track listing ==
1. "Horizon" - 9:10
2. "It's Too Late" - 6:04
3. "The Hyped Affect" - 6:00
4. "Tell Me That You Wait" - 4:19
5. "Black Flowers" - 5:46
6. "I Like You" - 3:59
7. "No Deeper Meaning" - 6:01
8. "Serious" - 5:16
9. "Der Erdbeermund" (Vocals - Jo Van Nelsen) - 4:05
10. "One Good Reason" - 5:10
11. "Tell Me That You Wait" (Airdrome Club Mix) - 8:28
12. "Horizon (Reprise)" - 5:27

== Personnel ==
=== Culture Beat ===
- Jay Supreme
- Lana Earl
- Jens Zimmermann
- Torsten Fenslau
- Jürgen Katzmann

=== Additional musicians ===
- Didi Kociemba
- Hubert Nitsch
- Istvan Hartmann
- Luise Tielmann
- Nino
- Peter Braunholz
