= Pay No Mind =

Pay No Mind may refer to:

- "Pay No Mind (Snoozer)", a 1994 song by Beck
- "Pay No Mind" (Culture Beat song), 1998
- "Pay No Mind", a song by Beach House from the 2018 album 7
- "Pay No Mind", a song by Alter Bridge from the 2019 album Walk the Sky
