= World in Your Hands =

1994 single by Culture Beat

Single by Culture Beat

from the album Serenity
- Released: 21 March 1994
- Genre: Techno-pop
- Length: 5:33
- Label: Dance Pool
- Songwriters: Nosie Katzmann; Jay Supreme; Torsten Fenslau; Peter Zweie
- Producer: Torsten Fenslau

Culture Beat singles chronology
"Anything" (1993)	"World in Your Hands" (1994)	"Inside Out" (1995)

Music video
- "World in Your Hands" on YouTube

"World in Your Hands" is a song by German Eurodance group Culture Beat, released in March 1994, by label Dance Pool, as the fourth single and the last one marketed in almost all countries in Europe from their second album, Serenity (1993). As for other Culture Beat's singles, a CD maxi entirely composed of remixes was added among the available media a short time after. The ballad is written by Nosie Katzmann with Jay Supreme, Torsten Fenslau and Peter Zweie, and produced by Fenslau. It was a top-10 hit in Finland, Israel and the Netherlands. In the United Kingdom, it peaked at number 20. Its accompanying music video was directed by Matt Broadley and filmed in Sweden.

== Critical reception ==
AllMusic editor William Cooper complimented the song as "competent and entertaining". In his weekly UK chart commentary, James Masterton said, "Just when it seemed Culture Beat records could not get any faster they suddenly release a slow one." Ian Gittens from Melody Maker found that it "isn't quite so instant [as 'Anything'] but it does boast the kind of killer chorus which many infinitely hipper club acts and DJs would die for." Alan Jones from Music Week commented, "After a trio of big hits, it is becoming obvious that Culture Beat aren't going to disappear overnight. And this is actually a more stylish and better-written song than some of their tunes, but it will probably meet with more resistance too as it is less obvious "in your face". Basically, it is a sweet ballad, but one which has been submerged beneath heavy percussion and bass elements and, like all the group's songs, it comes with a leaden rap."

Terry Staunton from NME commented, "Stress on my mind, I think I'll end it all/People tell me to stand tall/But I don't wanna live/Got nothin' to give/And I'm tired of hitting walls. Bloody hell! Continental techno pop with a suicide lyric! Can't wait to read The Chart Show captions on this one. Never mind 'Mr. Vain', Culture Beat ought to be calling the Samaritans. Inevitably destined for the Top Ten, and surely the only hit from this or any other year that advocates topping yourself with a bullet and a shot of gin." Sylvia Patterson from Smash Hits was less enthustiastic and gave it a score of two out of five, writing, "They are the new Snap! and to prove it they're here with a song just like all the others except it's got that "sinister" moody synth and underwater piano."

== Chart performance ==
"World in Your Hands" was a hit in most of the European countries where it was released, but didn't reach the same level of success as the previous singles of the band. However, it entered the top 10 in both Finland and the Netherlands, reaching number four and ten, respectively. Additionally, the single was a top-20 hit in Ireland (13), Denmark (16), Germany (18), and the United Kingdom. In the latter, it reached number 20 in its first week at the UK Singles Chart, on 27 March 1994. On the UK Dance Singles Chart, it fared better, peaking at number 17. In the group's native Germany, the single peaked at number 18 in its fourth week on the German Singles Chart, with four weeks inside the top 20 and 14 weeks within the chart. On the Eurochart Hot 100, "World in Your Hands" reached number 25 in May 1994, in its fifth week on the chart after charting in Austria, Belgium, Denmark, Finland, Germany, Ireland, Netherland and Switzerland. Outside Europe, the song was successful in West Asia, peaking at number two in Israel in its second week on the chart, on 5 April 1994. It also reached numbers 37 and 57 in New Zealand and Australia, respectively.

== Music video ==
The music video of "World in Your Hands" was directed by Swedish-based director Matt Broadley. It was filmed in Stockholm, Sweden and produced by Apollon Bild&Film, featuring lead singer Tania Evans and rapper Jay Supreme performing in a winter landscape. In the beginning, Evans sits in the backseat of a driving car, while Supreme walks on a ship dock. Then Evans performs while standing on a frozen lake covered with snow. At the end, they both meet on a cliff with a view over Stockholm city in the background. The video was A-listed on German music television channel VIVA in April 1994. One month later, MTV Europe put it on active rotation while France's MCM B-listed it in July 1994. Broadley had previously directed the videos for the group's earlier singles, "Mr. Vain" and "Anything". In 2024, "World in Your Hands" was made available on Culture Beat's official YouTube channel, remastered to 4K.

== Track listings ==
- 7-inch, Europe (1994)
1. "World in Your Hands" (Radio Edit) – 4:10
2. "World in Your Hands" (Tribal Mix) – 6:52
- 12-inch, Germany (1994)
1. "World in Your Hands" (Tribal Mix) – 6:52
2. "World in Your Hands" (Groovy Mix) – 7:27
3. "Anything" (Trancemix) – 6:30
4. "World in Your Hands" (Radio Edit) – 4:10
- CD single, UK and Europe (1994)
1. "World in Your Hands" (Radio Edit) – 4:10
2. "World in Your Hands" (Tribal Mix) – 6:58
3. "World in Your Hands" (Extended Album Version) – 7:24
4. "Anything" (Trance Mix) – 6:30
- CD maxi-single, Europe (1994)
1. "World in Your Hands" (Radio Edit) – 4:11
2. "World in Your Hands" (Tribal Mix) – 6:56
3. "World in Your Hands" (Extended Version) – 7:32
4. "World in Your Hands" (Extended Album Version) – 7:23
- CD maxi-single, Australia (1994)
1. "World in Your Hands" (Radio Edit) – 4:10
2. "World in Your Hands" (Tribal Mix) – 6:52
3. "World in Your Hands" (Groovy Mix) – 7:27
4. "World in Your Hands" (Extended Version) – 7:32
5. "World in Your Hands" (Extended Album Version) – 7:23
- CD maxi-single - Remix, Europe (1994)
1. "World in Your Hands" (MKM's Danish Flex Mix) – 6:23
2. "World in Your Hands" (M.S. Dance-Mix) – 6:11
3. "World in Your Hands" (Club In Trance-Mix) – 7:08
4. "World in Your Hands" (Not Normal Mix) – 7:35

== Charts ==
=== Weekly charts ===
Chart (1994)	Peak position
Australia (ARIA)	57
Austria (Ö3 Austria Top 40)	29
Belgium (Ultratop 50 Flanders)	29
Denmark (IFPI)	16
Europe (Eurochart Hot 100)	25
Finland (Suomen virallinen lista)	4
France (SNEP)	42
Germany (GfK)	18
Ireland (IRMA)	13
Israel (Israeli Singles Chart)	2
Netherlands (Dutch Top 40)	10
Netherlands (Single Top 100)	13
New Zealand (Recorded Music NZ)	37
Scotland (OCC)	26
Switzerland (Schweizer Hitparade)	29
UK Singles (OCC)	20
UK Airplay (Music Week)	32
UK Dance (Music Week)	17
UK Club Chart (Music Week)	82

=== Year-end charts ===
Chart (1994)	Position
Netherlands (Dutch Top 40)	105

== Release history ==
Region	Date	Format(s)	Label(s)	Ref.
United Kingdom	21 March 1994	7-inch vinyl; CD; cassette	Epic	
Australia	2 May 1994	12-inch vinyl; CD; cassette	Dance Pool	
