= Walk the Same Line =

Single by Culture Beat

from the album Inside Out
- B-side: "Show You Heaven"
- Released: 21 October 1996
- Recorded: 1995
- Genre: Eurodance
- Length: 3:56 (Radio Edit); 5:59 (Extended Version)
- Label: Dance Pool
- Songwriters: A. Kammermeier; F. Bülow; P. Hayo; W. Merziger F.; J. Supreme
- Producer: Perky Park

Culture Beat singles chronology
"Take Me Away" (1996)	"Walk the Same Line" (1996)	"Pay No Mind" (1998)

Music video
- "Walk the Same Line" on YouTube

"Walk the Same Line" is a song recorded by German Eurodance band Culture Beat, released in October 1996, by label Dance Pool, as the fourth and final single from their third studio album, Inside Out (1995). It is also the final release from the Tania Evans and Jay Supreme line up. The single became a top-20 hit in Finland, peaking at number 13. Additionally, it was a top-30 hit in Belgium and a top-40 hit in Austria and Sweden. A CD single containing remixes was also released, under the name "Walk the Same Line Remix". The accompanying music video was directed by German director Martin Weisz and filmed in New York City.

== Track listings ==
CD single (Germany, 1996)

1. "Walk the Same Line" (Radio Edit) - 3:56
2. "Walk the Same Line" (Euro Mix) - 5:21
  - Mixed By: Perky Park

CD maxi-single (Europe, 1996)

1. "Walk the Same Line" (Radio Edit) - 3:56
2. "Walk the Same Line" (Extended Mix) - 5:59
  - Mixed By: Perky Park
3. "Walk the Same Line" (Euro Mix) - 5:21
  - Mixed By: Perky Park
4. "Walk the Same Line" (Mode 2 Joy Mix) - 6:28
  - Remixed By: Michael Schendel, Tim Dobrovolny
5. "Walk the Same Line" (Not Normal Mix - Classical Mix) - 2:53
  - Remixed By: Frank Bülow, Nino Tielman*, Peter Gräber, Peter Ries
6. "Show You Heaven" - 4:58

CD maxi-single - Remix (Europe, 1996)

1. "Walk the Same Line" (Aboria Mix) - 6:23
  - Remixed By: Nino Tielmann, Peter Gräber
2. "Walk the Same Line" (Sweetbox Club Mix) - 5:33
  - Remixed By: Geoman
3. "Walk the Same Line" (Perky Park Mix) - 5:34
  - Mixed By: Perky Park
4. "Walk the Same Line" (Classical House Mix) - 6:15
  - Remixed By: Peter Ries
5. "Walk the Same Line" (Thors 66 Beat Mix) - 7:58
  - Remixed By:Thorhallur Skulason
6. "Walk the Same Line" (Brainstorm Mix) - 7:34
  - Remixed By: Dietz, Beyer

12" maxi vinyl single (Germany, 1996)

1. "Walk the Same Line" (Extended Mix) - 5:59
  - Mixed By: Perky Park
2. "Walk the Same Line" (Aboria Mix) - 6:22
  - Remixed By: Nino Tielmann, Peter Gräber
3. "Walk the Same Line" (Mode 2 Joy Mix) - 6:29
  - Remixed By: Michael Schendel, Tim Dobrovolny
4. "Walk the Same Line" (Brainstorm Mix) - 6:29
  - Remixed By: Dietz, Beyer
5. "Walk the Same Line" (Euro Mix) - 5:22
  - Mixed By: Perky Park

12" maxi vinyl single - Remix (Germany, 1996)

1. "Walk the Same Line" (Sweetbox Club Mix) - 5:33
  - Remixed By: Geoman
2. "Walk the Same Line" (Perky Park Mix) - 5:34
  - Remixed By: Perky Park
3. "Walk the Same Line" (Classical House Mix) - 6:15
  - Remixed By: Peter Ries
4. "Walk the Same Line" (Thors 66 Beat Mix) - 7:58
  - Remixed By: Thorhallur Skulason

== Charts ==
Chart (1996)	Peak position
Austria (Ö3 Austria Top 40)	38
Belgium (Ultratop 50 Flanders)	30
Finland (Suomen virallinen lista)	13
Germany (GfK)	64
Netherlands (Dutch Top 40 Tipparade)	17
Netherlands (Dutch Single Tip)	10
Sweden (Sverigetopplistan)	40
