= Rendez-Vous (Culture Beat song) =

Single by Culture Beat

from the album Metamorphosis
- Released: June 1998
- Genre: Eurodance
- Length: 3:55 (radio edit); 5:13 (extended version)
- Label: Columbia
- Songwriter: Frank Bülow
- Producer: Perky Park

Culture Beat singles chronology
"Pay No Mind" (1998)	"Rendez-Vous" (1998)	"You Belong" (1998)

Music video
- "Rendez-Vous" on YouTube

"Rendez-Vous" is a song recorded by German Eurodance band Culture Beat featuring American singer Kim Sanders. It was released in June 1998, by Columbia Records, as the second single from their fourth and last studio album, Metamorphosis (1998). The song is written by Frank Bülow and the lyrics has references to the Empire State, the Golden Gate and the Eiffel Tower. It was not as successful as the band's earlier singles, but became a top-40 hit in Austria, a top-50 hit in Sweden and a top-60 hit in their native Germany, peaking at number 53 on the German Singles Chart. Austrian director Matthias Schweger directed the accompanying music video which was filmed in Vienna, Austria and Barcelona, Spain.

== Track listing ==
- CD single, Germany (1998)
1. "Rendez-Vous" (Radio Edit) — 3:55
2. "Rendez-Vous" (Jazz Version / Not Normal Mix) — 3:55
- CD maxi, Spain (1998)
1. "Rendez-Vous" (Radio Edit) — 3:55
2. "Rendez-Vous" (Jazz Version / Not Normal Mix) — 3:55
3. "Rendez-Vous" (Extended Version) — 5:13
4. "Rendez-Vous" (Saturday Night Mix) — 6:09
5. "Rendez-Vous" (Superstring Remix) — 8:23
6. "Rendez-Vous" (Superstring Short Edit) — 4:03
7. "Rendez-Vous" (B-Low Mix) — 5:50

== Charts ==
Chart (1998)	Peak position
Austria (Ö3 Austria Top 40)	38
France (SNEP)	88
Germany (GfK)	53
Sweden (Sverigetopplistan)	48
