= Inside Out (Culture Beat song) =

1995 single by Culture Beat

Single by Culture Beat

from the album Inside Out
- Released: October 1995
- Genre: Eurodance; disco
- Length: 5:55 (album version); 3:55 (radio edit)
- Label: Dance Pool
- Songwriters: Nosie Katzmann; Jay Supreme; Doug Laurent
- Producer: Doug Laurent

Culture Beat singles chronology
"World in Your Hands" (1994)	"Inside Out" (1995)	"Crying in the Rain" (1996)

Music video
- "Inside Out" on YouTube

Alternative cover
- CD maxi – Remixes

"Inside Out" is a song by German Eurodance band Culture Beat, released in October 1995, by label Dance Pool, as the first single from their third studio album, Inside Out (1995). The song was written by Nosie Katzmann and Jay Supreme with its producer, Doug Laurent. It peaked at number five in Germany and entered the top 10 in Austria, Denmark and Hungary. Outside Europe, the song peaked at number two on the Canadian RPM Dance chart and number 15 on the US Billboard Dance Club Play chart. The accompanying music video was filmed in the US, depicting band members Tania Evans and Jay Supreme in a desert landscape.

== Critical reception ==
Upon the release, Larry Flick from Billboard magazine wrote, "Culture Beat, one of the more enduring acts from rave/NRG, returns with 'Inside Out', a jumpy li'l ditty on 550 Music. The techno flavor of the act's past recordings remains mildly intact, though the arrangements lean more toward soft keyboards and a fluffy disco context. Perfect for tea dances and other jolly gatherings." Pan-European magazine Music & Media named it Single of the Week, saying, "Chill out with the original Eurodance stars. A cuddly track chugging along at moderate speed combines with a sonorous male rap that makes it a sure EHR hit."

In a separate review, Music & Media wrote, "Dance freaks and club DJ's can delight in no less than 11 remixes. Still, it's the Not Loveland Master Radio Edit 1 which is most suitable for radio. The spooky male voice half way through this otherwise happy uptempo beat adds an unusual touch." James Hamilton from Music Week's RM Dance Update described the song as a "bland slick Euro throbber" in his weekly dance column, DJ directory.

== Chart performance ==
In Europe, "Inside Out" peaked within the top 10 in Austria, Denmark, Germany and Hungary. Additionally, it was a top-20 hit in Belgium, Finland and Switzerland, as well as on the Eurochart Hot 100, where it peaked at number 17 during its 12th week on the chart, on 27 January 1996. In the UK, it peaked at number 32 on the UK Singles Chart during its first week on the chart, on 21 January. The song also reached number 14 on UK Dance Singles Chart.

Outside Europe, "Inside Out" became a hit in North America, peaking at number two on the Canadian RPM Dance chart and number 15 on the US Billboard Dance Club Play chart. In Oceania, the single reached numbers 62 and 44 in Australia and New Zealand, respectively. In West Asia, it became a top-five hit in Israel, both debuting and peaking at number four on the chart, on 14 November 1995. It spent six weeks inside the Israeli top 30. "Inside Out" was awarded with a gold record in Germany, with a shipment of 150,000 singles.

== Music video ==
The music video for "Inside Out" was directed by Friedel & Chrudimak, produced by DoRo Film GmbH and filmed in the Mojave Desert, the US. It was A-listed on German music television channel VIVA and received heavy rotation on MTV Europe in November and December 1995.

== Track listings ==
- CD maxi-single (Europe, 1995)
1. "Inside Out" (radio edit) – 3:55
2. "Inside Out" (extended version) – 5:56
3. "Inside Out" (Doug Laurent mix) – 5:48
4. "Inside Out" (Temple of Light mix) – 6:50
5. "Inside Out" (Mikado mix) – 6:19
6. "Inside Out" (Transformed Brainstorm mix) – 7:57
7. "Inside Out" (Not Normal mix) – 2:29
- CD maxi-single – Remix (Europe, 1995)
1. "Inside Out" (Not Loveland Master radio edit 1) – 3:36
2. "Inside Out" (DNS radio mix) – 3:50
3. "Inside Out" (Doug Laurent Euro mix) – 6:16
4. "Inside Out" (Felix Gauder mix) – 6:28
5. "Inside Out" (DNS mix) – 5:01
6. "Inside Out" (Private Area mix) – 7:39
7. "Inside Out" (Andrew Brix Good Vibes mix) – 7:52
8. "Inside Out" (DJ Tom & Norman mix) – 7:22
9. "Inside Out" (Kai McDonald Eternia mix) – 9:48
10. "Inside Out" (Quadriga mix) – 6:19
11. "Inside Out" (Not Loveland Master mix 12-inch) – 8:58

== Charts ==
=== Weekly charts ===
Chart (1995)	Peak position
Australia (ARIA)	62
Austria (Ö3 Austria Top 40)	10
Belgium (Ultratop 50 Flanders)	14
Belgium (Ultratop 50 Wallonia)	19
Canada Dance/Urban (RPM)	2
Denmark (IFPI)	6
Europe (Eurochart Hot 100)	17
Europe (European Dance Radio)	12
Europe (European Hit Radio)	35
Finland (Suomen virallinen lista)	15
France (SNEP)	46
Germany (GfK)	5
Hungary (Mahasz)	9
Israel (Israeli Singles Chart)	4
Netherlands (Dutch Top 40)	28
Netherlands (Single Top 100)	30
New Zealand (Recorded Music NZ)	44
Quebec (ADISQ)	36
Scotland (OCC)	27
Sweden (Sverigetopplistan)	23
Switzerland (Schweizer Hitparade)	11
UK Singles (OCC)	32
UK Dance (OCC)	14
UK Club Chart (Music Week)	55
US Billboard Bubbling Under Hot 100	22
US Hot Dance Club Play (Billboard)	15

=== Year-end charts ===
Chart (1995)	Position
Germany (Media Control)	91

Chart (1996)	Position
Europe (Eurochart Hot 100)	95
Germany (Media Control)	76

== Certifications ==
Region	Certification	Certified units/sales
Germany (BVMI)	Gold	250,000^{^}
^{^} Shipments figures based on certification alone.

== Release history ==
Region	Date	Format(s)	Label(s)	Ref.
Germany	October 1995	—N/a	Dance Pool	
Australia	23 October 1995	CD; cassette	Dance Pool	
Australia	30 October 1995	2×12-inch vinyl	Dance Pool	
Europe	3 November 1995	CD	Dance Pool	
United Kingdom	15 January 1996	12-inch vinyl; CD; cassette	Epic	
