= Anything (Culture Beat song) =

1993 single by Culture Beat

Single by Culture Beat

from the album Serenity
- Released: December 1993
- Genre: Eurodance; hip house; hi-NRG
- Length: 6:24
- Label: Dance Pool
- Songwriters: Nosie Katzmann; Jay Supreme; Torsten Fenslau; Peter Zweier
- Producer: Torsten Fenslau

Culture Beat singles chronology
"Got to Get It" (1993)	"Anything" (1993)	"World in Your Hands" (1994)

Music video
- "Anything" on YouTube

"Anything" is a song by German Eurodance group Culture Beat, released in December 1993 by Dance Pool as the third single from the group's second album, Serenity (1993). Written by Nosie Katzmann with group member Jay Supreme, Torsten Fenslau and Peter Zweier, and produced by Fenslau, the song was very successful on the charts across Europe. It reached the top five in at least nine countries, including Belgium, France, Germany, Spain and the United Kingdom. Its accompanying music video, inspired by Blade Runner, was directed by Matt Broadley and filmed in London.

== Critical reception ==
Larry Flick from Billboard magazine reviewed the song favourably, stating that the German rave/pop duo "likely will continue to enjoy widespread action with this hooky, NRGetic anthem." He added, "Rapper Jay Supreme raps with fire and speed, while Tania Evans does her best with a chorus that is maddeningly silly. And yet single has ample charm, fueled by a double-pack of remixes that are sure to woo DJs at several formats." John Patrick from Lake District News declared it as "another good one". In his weekly UK chart commentary, James Masterton wrote, "Despite being as formulaic as the last two, the new hit is actually quite good fun, trying at times to make the rapper trip over his own tongue in what is one of the fastest sung dance records ever." Ian Gittens from Melody Maker praised it as "a brilliant disposable pop single with a wiggle in its walk and a lustrous shimmer."

Pan-European magazine Music & Media said, "By now everybody knows what it tastes like. But at the moment it's a matter of addiction for the public, and a third European hit from the Serenity album is within reach." Alan Jones from Music Week felt the song "is an altogether less compelling record. It's much too frantic, rattling along like any number of rave/hi-NRG tracks, and possesses an uncharismatic rap. Sure to score, but don't expect it to chart particularly high, or hang around for long." James Hamilton from the Record Mirror Dance Update described it as a "frantic hip house galloper" in his weekly dance column. Mark Frith from Smash Hits gave it a score of four out of five, writing that Culture Beat has released a "rather good breakneck speed dance record. It's not destined to be as big a chart hit as 'Mr Vain' and 'Got to Get It', but it'll go Top 20 all the same. It should do masses for their credibility club-wise."

== Chart performance ==
"Anything" was a chart success in many countries, particularly in Austria, Denmark, France and Spain where it reached the top five, and in the UK, where the song peaked at number five during its first week on the UK Singles Chart, on 9 January 1994; It spent two weeks at that position and reached number two on the Music Week Dance Singles chart in the same period. "Anything" also entered the top 20 in Finland, Italy, the Netherlands, Sweden and Switzerland. On the Eurochart Hot 100, it peaked at number four during its fourth week on the chart, on 5 February. Outside Europe, the single became a top-3 hit in Israel, where it debuted and peaked as number three and stayed for four weeks at that position from 21 December 1993. In North America, it reached number six on Canada's RPM Dance chart and number seven on the US Billboard Dance Club Play chart. In Australia, it peaked at number 12 on the ARIA singles chart. "Anything" was awarded with a gold record in Australia and Germany, after 35,000 and 250,000 units were shipped, respectively.

== Airplay ==
"Anything" peaked at number one on the European Dance Radio Chart, becoming the most-played dance song on European radio in the week of 15 January 1994. It also entered the European airplay chart Border Breakers at number 20 on 8 January 1994 due to crossover airplay in West Central- and South-European regions and peaked at number four on 22 January.

== Music video ==
The music video for "Anything" was directed by Swedish-based director Matt Broadley and produced by Apollon Bild&Film. It was filmed in London on 9th November 1993 and is inspired by the 1982 film Blade Runner, which was a vision producer Torsten Fenslau had for the video. "Anything" received heavy rotation on MTV Europe and medium rotation on Germany's VIVA in January and February 1994. It was later made available on Culture Beat's official YouTube channel remastered to 4K in 2024.

== Track listings ==
- CD maxi-single (Europe, 1993)
1. "Anything" (Grosser Club Mix) – 7:34
2. "Anything" (Introless) – 6:11
3. "Anything" (Tribal House Mix) – 6:29
4. "Anything" (Radio Converted) – 3:56
5. "Anything" (MTV Mix) – 4:35
- CD maxi-single – Remix (Europe, 1994)
1. "Anything" (Trancemix) – 6:29 (Remix by Doug Laurent)
2. "Anything" (Not Normal Mix) – 6:06 (Remix by Peter Gräber)
3. "Anything" (T'N'T Partyzone Chicken Beat Mix) – 5:26 (Remix by Tillmann, Tielmann)
4. "Anything" (Tribal) – 6:09 (Remix by Doug Laurent)

- Vinyl 12-inch (US, 1994)
1. "Anything" (Album Version) – 6:24
2. "Anything" (Ralphi's Club Mix W/O Rap) – 7:03 (Remix by Ralphi Rosario)
3. "Anything" (TNT Party Zone Mix) – 5:26 (Remix by Tillmann, Tielmann)
4. "Anything" (Ralphi's Anything You Want Mix) – 6:00 (Remix by Ralphi Rosario)
5. "Anything" (Introless Mix) – 6:11
6. "Anything" (SSL Main Mix) – 6:35
- CD maxi-single (US, 1994)
1. "Anything" (Radio Converted Mix) – 3:56
2. "Anything" (Ralphi's Radio Remix) – 3:40 (Remix by Ralphi Rosario)
3. "Anything" (Grosser Club Mix) – 7:34
4. "Anything" (TNT Party Zone Mix) – 5:26 (Remix by Tillmann, Tielmann)
5. "Anything" (Ralphi's Anything You Want Mix) – 6:00 (Remix by Ralphi Rosario)
6. "Culture Beat DMC Megamix" – 6:33

== Charts ==
=== Weekly charts ===
Weekly chart performance for "Anything"
Chart (1993–1994)	Peak position
Australia (ARIA)	12
Austria (Ö3 Austria Top 40)	3
Belgium (Ultratop 50 Flanders)	5
Canada Dance/Urban (RPM)	6
Denmark (IFPI)	4
Europe (Eurochart Hot 100)	4
Europe (European Dance Radio)	1
Europe (European Hit Radio)	28
Finland (Suomen virallinen lista)	12
France (SNEP)	4
Germany (GfK)	4
Ireland (IRMA)	3
Israel (Israeli Singles Chart)	3
Italy (Musica e dischi)	15
Netherlands (Dutch Top 40)	4
Netherlands (Single Top 100)	6
Spain (AFYVE)	4
Sweden (Sverigetopplistan)	15
Switzerland (Schweizer Hitparade)	7
UK Singles (Official Charts)	5
UK Airplay (Music Week)	16
UK Dance (Music Week)	2
UK Club Chart (Music Week)	75
US Dance Club Play (Billboard)	7
US Maxi-Singles Sales (Billboard)	17

=== Year-end charts ===
1994 year-end chart performance for "Anything"
Chart (1994)	Position
Australia (ARIA)	78
Austria (Ö3 Austria Top 40)	26
Belgium (Ultratop)	33
Europe (Eurochart Hot 100)	29
Europe (European Dance Radio)	6
France (SNEP)	37
Germany (Media Control)	38
Netherlands (Dutch Top 40)	36
Netherlands (Single Top 100)	44
Switzerland (Schweizer Hitparade)	30
UK Singles (OCC)	77

== Certifications ==
Certifications and sales for "Anything"
Region	Certification	Certified units/sales
Australia (ARIA)	Gold	35,000^{^}
Germany (BVMI)	Gold	250,000^{^}
^{^} Shipments figures based on certification alone.
