= Metamorphosis (Culture Beat album) =

Studio album by Culture Beat
- Released: 1 May 1998
- Recorded: August–December 1997
- Genre: Eurodance
- Label: Columbia COL 489915 6
- Producer: Frank Bülow, Matiz, Nino Tielman, Perky Park, Peter Gräber

Culture Beat chronology
Inside Out (1995)	Metamorphosis (1998)	Best of Culture Beat (2003)

Singles from Metamorphosis
- 1. "Pay No Mind" Released: March 1998; 2. "Rendez-Vous" Released: June 1998; 3. "You Belong" Released: September 1998

Metamorphosis is the fourth studio album by Culture Beat. It was released by Columbia Records on 1 May 1998. The record includes three singles.

== Track listing ==
1. "Pay No Mind"
2. "You Belong"
3. "Faith in Your Heart"
4. "Blue Skies"
5. "Rendez-Vous"
6. "Guardian Angel"
7. "Electrify Me"
8. "Pray for Redemption"
9. "This Is My Time"
10. "Do You Really Know"
11. "Language of Love"
12. "Metamorphosis"

== Personnel ==
Producer – Frank Bülow (tracks: 9), Matiz (tracks: 11), Nino Tielman* (tracks: 1 to 4, 12), Perky Park (tracks: 5 to 8, 10), Peter Gräber (tracks: 1 to 4, 9, 12)
Peter Zweier (tracks: 11)
Vocals – Kim Sanders
