= Alex Metzger =

Alex Metzger may refer to:

- Alex Metzger (bobsledder)
- Alex Metzger (footballer)
