= Got to Get It (Culture Beat song) =

1993 single by Culture Beat

Single by Culture Beat

from the album Serenity
- Released: 13 September 1993
- Studio: Eurodance
- Length: 5:21 (album version); 3:52 (video edit)
- Label: Dance Pool
- Songwriters: Nosie Katzmann; Jay Supreme; Torsten Fenslau; Peter Zweier
- Producer: Torsten Fenslau

Culture Beat singles chronology
| "Mr. Vain" (1993) | "Got to Get It" (1993) | "Anything" (1993) |

Music video
- "Got to Get It" on YouTube

"Got to Get It" is a song by German group Culture Beat from their second studio album, Serenity (1993). The song was written by Nosie Katzmann, Jay Supreme, Torsten Fenslau and Peter Zweier, and produced by Fenslau. The lyrics describes the feeling of not getting over someone you once were in love with, hence the refrain Got to get it, got to get it out of my head.

"Got to Get It" was released as the second single from Serenity on 13 September 1993 and was a hit in Europe, peaking at number one in both Belgium and Finland. The single was also a top-five hit in Denmark, Germany, Ireland, Italy, Lithuania, Spain, Sweden, the Netherlands and the UK. In the UK, the US and Canada, the song peaked at number one on the dance music charts. Its music video was directed by Martin Person and filmed in Denmark and Portugal, telling the story of two lovers breaking up.

== Critical reception ==
AllMusic editor William Cooper viewed "Got to Get It" as a "virtual rewrite" of "Mr. Vain". Larry Flick from Billboard magazine described it as a "wickedly catchy twirler that appears poised to follow the trend-setting 'Mr. Vain' to the top of club playlists and on to top 40 formats". He added, "The song's hook will instantly stick to the brain, while the plethora of pop/rave beats will sneak up the spine." He also felt that it sports a better chorus than its predecessor and "aggressive, synth-soaked beats", and said the "blend of party-down male rapping and cute female-belting is familiar and fun." Alan Jones from Music Week gave it a score of four out of five and named it Pick of the Week, commenting, "Got to get it out of my head they sing, and you'll be thinking the same when you hear this surefire hit follow-up", where "throbbing Hi-NRG, though with a light vocal touch, and a typical Snap!-style rap all come together to create an instant and likeable smash."

Iestyn George from NME felt the song is not as catchy as "Mr. Vain". James Hamilton from the Record Mirror Dance Update declared it as "another overly similar bland synth buzzed chugger". Mike Soutar from Smash Hits also gave the song four out of five. He felt it was better than "Mr. Vain", saying, "So it is with great surprise that I actually find myself liking 'Got to Get It'. Buzzy, fast, with a smashing whiplash sample, it's a corking dance tune that's approximately 50 times better than 2 Unlimited's 'Faces'." Sunday Mirror wrote, "After a day spent humming Culture Beat's incredibly catchy follow up to their chart-topper 'Mr Vain', you'll agree with the lyric, Got to get it out of my head." The reviewer concluded with that the song is "high-energy pop" and "a surefire smash both on the dance floor and in the charts."

== Chart performance ==
In Europe, "Got to Get It" peaked at number one in both Belgium and Finland. In Belgium, it peaked at number one for two weeks, staying within the Ultratop Flanders singles chart for a total of 17 weeks. In Finland, it peaked at the top for four weeks in October, November and December 1993. The song was also a top-five hit in Denmark, Germany, Ireland, Italy, Lithuania, the Netherlands, Spain, Sweden, and the UK. In the Netherlands and Spain, it peaked at number two. Additionally, the single was a top-10 hit in Austria, France, Norway and Switzerland.

In the United Kingdom, "Got to Get It" peaked at number four in its second week on the UK Singles Chart on 13 November 1993, after debuting at number seven the week before. It stayed inside the UK top 100 for 11 consecutive weeks. On the Music Week Dance Singles chart, it debuted and peaked at number one in the same week. On the Eurochart Hot 100, the single reached number three on 27 November, after debuting on the chart at number 38 on 25 September, when it charted in Denmark, Germany, Norway and Sweden. In North America, "Got to Get It" peaked at number one on both the Canadian RPM Dance chart and the US Billboard Dance Club Play chart. In Oceania, the song reached numbers seven and 13 in Australia and New Zealand, respectively. In West Asia, it became a successful top-five hit in Israel, peaking at number five on 24 August 1993. It spent two weeks at that position and 7 weeks within the Israeli top 30. "Got to Get It" was awarded with a gold record in both Germany and Australia.

== Airplay ==
"Got to Get It" was positioned at number six when the first European airplay chart Border Breaker was compiled due to crossover airplay in West Central-, West-, North West-, North- and South-Europe. The single hit number-one on 21 November 1993, where it stayed for four weeks. It peaked at number-one also on the European Dance Radio Top 25 in Music & Media on 20 November 1993, holding the top position for a total of six consecutive weeks. In the United Kingdom, the song reached number five on the Music Week Airplay chart in the beginning of December same year.

== Music video ==
A music video was produced to promote the single, directed by Martin Person for Apollon Bild&Film. It tells the story of two lovers ending their relationship, intertwined with flashbacks to the days when they were in love. Other scenes show them by themselves after the breakup, as they're reminiscing on the past. The video was filmed in Alvor, Portugal, and in Copenhagen Denmark, and received heavy rotation on MTV Europe in November 1993.

== Track listing and formats ==
- 7-inch vinyl single (Netherlands, 1993)
1. "Got to Get It" (radio mix) – 3:39
2. "Got to Get It" (video Edit) – 3:52
- 12-inch vinyl single (United States, 1994)
1. "Got to Get It" (Raw Deal mix) – 5:34
2. "Got to Get It" (Club to House mix) – 5:52
3. "Got to Get It" (Hypnotic mix) – 7:17
4. "Got to Get It" (Resolution mix) – 7:35
- CD maxi single (Europe, 1993)
1. "Got to Get It" (Raw Deal mix) – 5:34
2. "Got to Get It" (club mix) – 6:01
3. "Got to Get It" (extended album mix) – 6:39
4. "Got to Get It" (Hypnotic mix) – 7:17
5. "Got to Get It" (radio mix) – 3:39
- CD maxi single – Remix (Europe, 1993)
1. "Got to Get It" (Funlab mix) – 6:36
2. "Got to Get It" (Club to House mix) – 5:52
3. "Got to Get It" (TNT Party Zone mix) – 5:41
4. "Got to Get It" (Basic House mix) – 6:22
5. "Got to Get It" (Last Minute mix) – 6:56
6. "Got to Get It" (radio remix) – 4:09

== Charts ==
=== Weekly charts ===
Weekly chart performance for "Got to Get It"
| Chart (1993–1994) | Peak position |
|---|---|
| Australia (ARIA) | 7 |
| Austria (Ö3 Austria Top 40) | 7 |
| Belgium (Ultratop 50 Flanders) | 1 |
| Canada Dance/Urban (RPM) | 1 |
| Denmark (IFPI) | 4 |
| Europe (Eurochart Hot 100) | 3 |
| Europe (European Dance Radio) | 1 |
| Europe (European Hit Radio) | 23 |
| Finland (Suomen virallinen lista) | 1 |
| France (SNEP) | 10 |
| Germany (GfK) | 4 |
| Ireland (IRMA) | 3 |
| Israel (Israeli Singles Chart) | 5 |
| Italy (Musica e dischi) | 5 |
| Lithuania (M-1) | 5 |
| Netherlands (Dutch Top 40) | 2 |
| Netherlands (Single Top 100) | 2 |
| New Zealand (Recorded Music NZ) | 13 |
| Norway (VG-lista) | 6 |
| Spain (AFYVE) | 2 |
| Sweden (Sverigetopplistan) | 5 |
| Switzerland (Schweizer Hitparade) | 7 |
| UK Singles (OCC) | 4 |
| UK Airplay (Music Week) | 5 |
| UK Dance (Music Week) | 1 |
| UK Club Chart (Music Week) | 6 |
| US Bubbling Under Hot 100 Singles (Billboard) | 7 |
| US Dance Club Play (Billboard) | 1 |
| US Maxi-Singles Sales (Billboard) | 16 |

=== Year-end charts ===
Year-end chart performance for "Got to Get It"
| Chart (1993) | Position |
|---|---|
| Australia (ARIA) | 89 |
| Belgium (Ultratop 50 Flanders) | 17 |
| Europe (Eurochart Hot 100) | 29 |
| Germany (Media Control) | 32 |
| Netherlands (Dutch Top 40) | 43 |
| Netherlands (Single Top 100) | 45 |
| Sweden (Topplistan) | 10 |
| UK Singles (OCC) | 62 |
| UK Airplay (Music Week) | 47 |

1994 year-end chart performance for "Got to Get It"
| Chart (1994) | Position |
|---|---|
| Australia (ARIA) | 100 |
| Canada Dance/Urban (RPM) | 12 |
| US Dance Club Play (Billboard) | 12 |

== Certifications ==
Certifications for "Got to Get It"
| Region | Certification | Certified units/sales |
|---|---|---|
| Australia (ARIA) | Gold | 35,000^{^} |
| Germany (BVMI) | Gold | 250,000^{^} |
^{^} Shipments figures based on certification alone.

== Release history ==
Release dates and formats for "Got to Get It"
| Region | Date | Format(s) | Label(s) | Ref. |
|---|---|---|---|---|
| Europe | 13 September 1993 | CD | Dance Pool | |
| Australia | 1 November 1993 | CD; cassette | Dance Pool; Columbia | |
