= Pay No Mind (Culture Beat song) =

Single by Culture Beat

from the album Metamorphosis
- Released: March 1998
- Recorded: paraDOX Studios
- Genre: Eurodance
- Length: 3:41 (radio edit); 5:19 (extended version)
- Label: Columbia
- Songwriters: Kim Sanders; Frank Fenslau
- Producers: Nino Tielmann; Peter Gräber

Culture Beat singles chronology
"Walk the Same Line" (1996)	"Pay No Mind" (1998)	"Rendez-Vous" (1998)

Music video
- "Pay No Mind" on YouTube

"Pay No Mind" is a song recorded by German Eurodance band Culture Beat, released in March 1998, by Columbia Records, as the lead single from their fourth studio album, Metamorphosis (1998). The song is produced by Nino Tielmann and Peter Gräber, and is also the first release to feature a new vocalist, American singer Kim Sanders, who also co-wrote the lyrics with Frank Fenslau. She had previously been performing on songs by other German Eurodance bands, like Captain Hollywood Project and Loft. "Pay No Mind" was a top-30 hit in the band's native Germany and a top-40 hit in Austria. The accompanying music video was directed by Volker Hannwacker and filmed in Cape Town, South Africa.

== Track listings ==
- CD single, Europe (1998)
1. "Pay No Mind" (Radio Edit) — 3:41
2. "Pay No Mind" (Not Normal Mix - String Version) — 3:57
- CD maxi, Europe (1998)
1. "Pay No Mind" (Radio Edit) — 3:41
2. "Pay No Mind" (Not Normal Mix - String Version) — 3:57
3. "Pay No Mind" (Extended Version) — 5:19
4. "Pay No Mind" (DJ Taucher Remix) — 7:59
5. "Pay No Mind" (Aboria GC Remix) — 10:24
6. "Pay No Mind" (Ocean Pacific Remix) — 4:31

== Charts ==
Chart (1998)	Peak position
Austria (Ö3 Austria Top 40)	37
Germany (GfK)	27
