= Alex Metzger (footballer) =

New Zealand footballer

Personal information
- Full name: Alex James Metzger

Senior career*
Years	Team	Apps	(Gls)
1979	Blockhouse Bay		
1981	Manurewa		
1983	Mount Wellington		
1984	Papatoetoe		

International career
1979–1984	New Zealand	10	(1)
- * Club domestic league appearances and goals

Alex Metzger is a former association football player who represented New Zealand at international level.

Metzger attended Lynfield College in Auckland. He made his full All Whites debut in a 6–0 win over Fiji on 29 June 1979 and ended his international playing career with 10 A-international caps and 1 goal to his credit, becoming the first and only All White to score against Sudan. His final cap was an appearance in a 0–1 loss to Bahrain on 4 April 1984.
