= Tania Evans =

British singer-songwriter

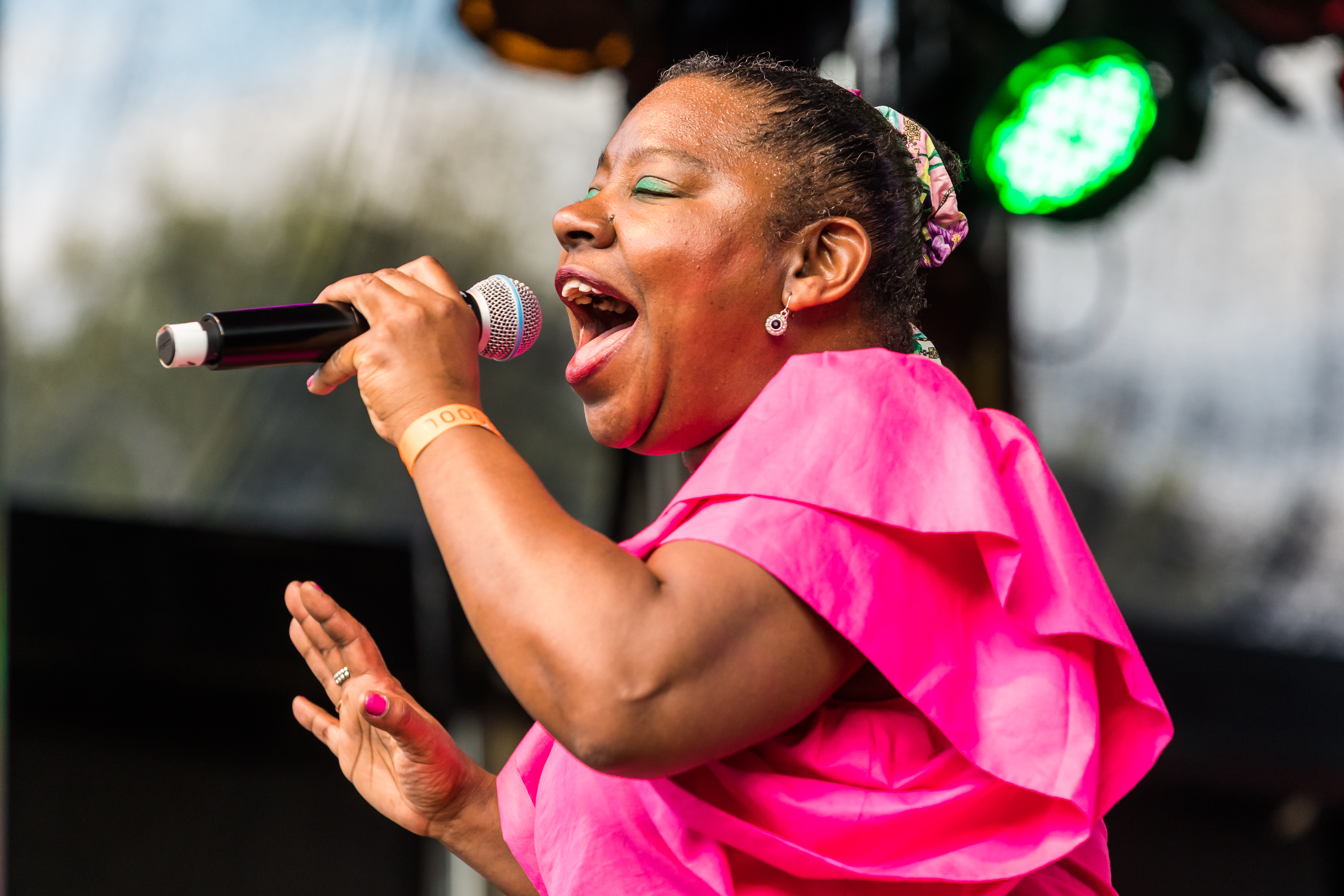
- Evans performing in 2019

Background information
- Born: 28 May 1967 (age 59); Edmonton, London, England
- Genres: Electronic; house; Eurodance
- Occupations: Singer, songwriter
- Years active: 1992–present
- Label: Dance Pool
- Formerly of: Culture Beat
- Website: taniaevans.eu

Tania Evans (born 28 May 1967) is a British singer and songwriter. She gained popularity for fronting the German Eurodance group Culture Beat from 1993 to 1997.

== Career ==
Evans' first release was the single "Can't Let Go" in 1992 on C.T Records. Shortly after, she replaced Lana Earl in Culture Beat and found immediate success with their single "Mr. Vain", with Evans on vocals. "Mr. Vain" became Culture Beat's most successful single, reaching No. 1 in 13 countries. Evans also sang vocals on the singles "Got to Get It", "Anything", "World in Your Hands", "Inside Out", "Crying in the Rain" (which she co-wrote), "Walk the Same Line" and "Take Me Away" with Culture Beat, before she was replaced by Kim Sanders in 1997.

After leaving Culture Beat, Evans released a solo single entitled "Prisoner of Love" which she composed with Peter Ries. The single includes a remix by Hendrick Schimann and Mike Romeo. It was released by Columbia/Sony Music and reached the top 10 on the U.S. Billboard Club Dance chart and No. 75 in Germany. She also appeared on Kosmonova's single "Singing in My Mind" in 1998, which reached No. 78 in Germany.

In 2003, Evans released a house-style single entitled "Strength to Carry On" on Dos or Die Recordings.
