= Jay Supreme =

American rapper

Jeffrey Carmichael (born August 20, 1965), better known as Jay Supreme, is an American hip-hop artist and former co-lead artist of German Eurodance group Culture Beat.

== Biography ==
Carmichael was born in Paterson, New Jersey. There, as a teenager, he formed his own rap group. He later went to Germany for his military duty, serving in the U.S. Army in 1989. He left the army in 1991 to focus on his music career.

== With Culture Beat ==
Carmichael is best known for his rapping with the popular Eurodance group Culture Beat, such as on the song "No Deeper Meaning", with Lana Earl on vocals. Carmichael was already a rapper on early Culture Beat songs from 1990, when they released the singles "I Like You" and "Erdbeermund", but the most successful years with the group were 1993–1997, when they achieved worldwide hits with "Mr. Vain", "Got to Get It", "Anything", "Inside Out", "World in Your Hands", and "Crying in the Rain".

== Solo career and present status ==
In 1997, Carmichael and Tania Evans left Culture Beat to pursue solo careers. Carmichael began working with the group Rappers Against Racism, featuring on their two hits, "Sorry" and "Hiroshima (Fly Little Bird)". In the summer of 2000, he released his lone solo single, "Your Love (Encore)" which featured Cheryl Lynn. The song received airplay on European hip-hop/R&B radio stations. He is currently living in New Jersey.

In 2015 he officially left the music industry. He has a Facebook account, Jeff Culture Beat Carmichael, where he interacts with fans.
