= Torsten Fenslau =

- Born: 23 April 1964; Kleinheubach, West Germany
- Died: 6 November 1993 (aged 29); Messel, Germany
- Genres: Electronic, Eurodance
- Occupations: Composer, record producer, musician, dj
- Years active: 1987–1993
- Label: Abfahrt Records
- Formerly of: Culture Beat

Torsten Fenslau (23 April 1964 — 6 November 1993) was a German disc jockey and music producer, and can be characterized as an important pioneer in the early Sound of Frankfurt.

== Career ==
From 1982 to 1993, Fenslau served as a DJ at the nightclub Dorian Gray in Frankfurt, Germany. He hosted two radio shows on Hessischer Rundfunk in Frankfurt until his death.

In 1988, he released his first production, "The Dream", through the group, Out of the Ordinary, which included snippets from the "I Have a Dream" speech given by Martin Luther King Jr.

He founded his own label, Abfahrt Records, through which he released titles as Culture Beat, Die Schwarze Zone, Force Legato - System and Heute ist ein guter Tag zu sterben.

His greatest commercial success was founding the group Culture Beat in 1989. Their 1993 song "Mr. Vain" topped the charts for several weeks in many European countries and found international success.

== Death ==
On 6 November 1993, Fenslau was driving near Messel, Germany, when he skidded off the road and was ejected from his car. He died from internal injuries at the hospital. Coincidently, the day Fenslau died was the day that Culture Beat's second single "Got to Get it" entered the UK Singles Chart (at #7).
