= List of songs recorded by Ace of Base =

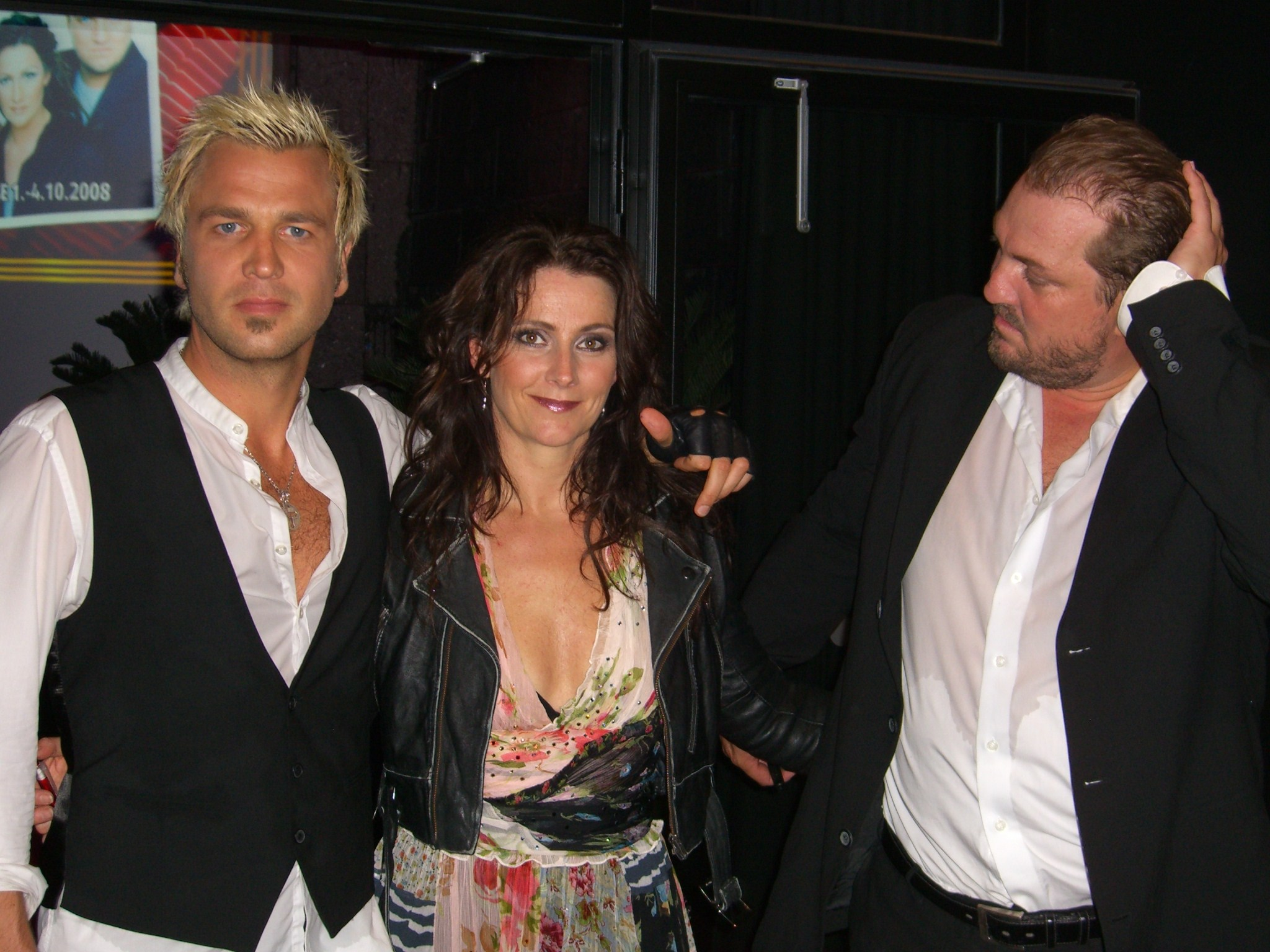
The Swedish group Ace of Base before their concert in Vantaa, Finland on October 2, 2008.

The following is a list of released songs recorded and performed by Ace of Base.

Song	Writer(s)	Album(s)	Year	Ref.
Adventures in Paradise	Jonas "Joker" Berggren	Flowers; Cruel Summer	1998	
All for You		The Golden Ratio	2010	
All Temptations	Jonas "Joker" Berggren	Hidden Gems, Vol. 2	2020	
All That She Wants	Jonas "Joker" Berggren; Ulf "Buddha" Ekberg	Happy Nation; Happy Nation (U.S. Version); The Sign	1992	
Always Have, Always Will	Jonas "Joker" Berggren	Flowers; Cruel Summer	1998	
Angel Eyes	Jonas "Joker" Berggren; Billy Steinberg	The Bridge	1995	
Angel of Love	Ulf "Buddha" Ekberg; John Ballard; Björn Stenström	Hidden Gems, Vol. 2	2020	
At The Borderline (Moogoperator 2)	Jonas "Joker" Berggren; Ulf "Buddha" Ekberg	Hidden Gems, Vol. 2	2020	
Bad Dad	Jonas "Joker" Berggren; Ulf "Buddha" Ekberg	Hidden Gems, Vol. 2	2020	
Beautiful Life	John Ballard; Jonas "Joker" Berggren	The Bridge	1995	
Beautiful Morning	Jenny Berggren; Jonas "Joker" Berggren; Linn Berggren	Da Capo	2002	
Black Sea		The Golden Ratio	2010	
Blah, Blah, Blah on the Radio		The Golden Ratio	2010	
Blooming 18	Jonas "Joker" Berggren; Billy Steinberg	The Bridge	1995	
C'est la Vie (Always 21)	Jonas "Joker" Berggren	Singles of the 90s	1999	
Captain Nemo	Jonas "Joker" Berggren	Flowers	1998	
Cecilia	Jonas "Joker" Berggren	Flowers; Cruel Summer	1998	
Change with the Light	Jenny Berggren; Jonas "Joker" Berggren; Linn Berggren; Ulf "Buddha" Ekberg	Da Capo	2002	
Close to You	Jonas "Joker" Berggren; Ulf "Buddha" Ekberg	Hidden Gems, Vol. 2	2020	
Come to Me	Jonas "Joker" Berggren; Arild Haugland; Birthe Berggren	Hidden Gems	2015	
Couldn’t Care Less	Jonas "Joker" Berggren; Jenny Berggren; Ulf "Buddha" Ekberg; Jakob Petrén	Hidden Gems, Vol. 2	2020	
Cruel Summer	Sara Dallin; Siobhan Fahey; Steve Jolley; Tony Swain; Keren Woodward	Flowers; Cruel Summer	1998	
Cuba, Cuba Libre	Jonas "Joker" Berggren	Hidden Gems (iTunes edition)	2015	
Da Capo	Jonas "Joker" Berggren	Da Capo	2002	
Dancer in a Daydream		Happy Nation; Happy Nation (U.S. Version); The Sign	1992	
Dimension of Depth	Jonas "Joker" Berggren	Happy Nation	1992	
Donnie	Jonas "Joker" Berggren	Flowers; Cruel Summer	1998	
Don't Go Away	John Ballard; Ulf "Buddha" Ekberg	Flowers; Cruel Summer	1998	
Don't Stop	Jonas "Joker" Berggren; Arild Haugland; Birthe Berggren	Da Capo (Japanese edition)	2002	
Don't Turn Around	Albert Hammond; Diane Warren	Happy Nation (U.S. Version); The Sign	1993	
Don't Turn Around 2009	Albert Hammond; Diane Warren	Greatest Hits	2008	
Doreen		The Golden Ratio	2010	
Dr. Sun	Jonas "Joker" Berggren	Flowers	1998	
Edge of Heaven	Ulf "Buddha" Ekberg	The Bridge	1995	
Everytime It Rains	Rick Nowels; Billy Steinberg; Maria Vidal	Cruel Summer	1998	
Experience Pearls		The Bridge	1995	
Fashion Party	Jonas "Joker" Berggren	Happy Nation; Happy Nation (U.S. Version)	1992	
For a Thousand Days	Jonas "Joker" Berggren; Ulf "Buddha" Ekberg	Hidden Gems, Vol. 2	2020	
Funk Funk	Jonas "Joker" Berggren; Ulf "Buddha" Ekberg	Hidden Gems, Vol. 2	2020	
Girl in the Line	Jonas "Joker" Berggren	Hidden Gems, Vol. 2	2020	
Giving It Up	Jonas "Joker" Berggren; Ulf "Buddha" Ekberg	Happy Nation (U.S. Version) (Remastered); Hidden Gems	2015	
Go Go Go	Jonas "Joker" Berggren	Hidden Gems	2015	
Hallo Hallo	Jonas "Joker" Berggren	Singles of the 90s	1999	
Happy Nation		Happy Nation; Happy Nation (U.S. Version); The Sign	1992	
He Decides	Jenny Berggren	Flowers; Cruel Summer	1998	
Hear Me Calling	Jonas Berggren; Ulf Ekberg; Jenny Berggren; Linn Berggren	Happy Nation (U.S. Version)	1993	
Hey Darling	Jonas "Joker" Berggren	Da Capo	2002	
I Pray	John Ballard; Ulf "Buddha" Ekberg	Flowers	1998	
Immanuel	Jenny Berggren	Hidden Gems, Vol. 2	2020	
Into the Night of Blue	Jonas "Joker" Berggren; Douglas Carr; Diane Warren	Cruel Summer (Japanese edition)	1998	
Juliet		The Golden Ratio	2010	
Just 'N' Image	Linn Berggren	The Bridge	1995	
Kings and Queens	Ulf "Buddha" Ekberg; John Ballard	Cruel Summer (Remastered)	2015	
Kyrie Eleison	Jonas "Joker" Berggren	Hidden Gems, Vol. 2	2020	
L'amour	Jonas "Joker" Berggren; Billy Steinberg	Flowers (Remastered)	2015	
Life Is a Flower	Jonas "Joker" Berggren	Flowers	1998	
Living in Danger	Jonas "Joker" Berggren; Ulf "Buddha" Ekberg	Happy Nation (U.S. Version); The Sign	1993	
Look Around Me	Ulf "Buddha" Ekberg; John Ballard	Hidden Gems	2015	
Love for Sale	Jonas "Joker" Berggren	The Bridge (Remastered)	2015	
Love in December	Jonas Berggren; Ulf Ekberg; Jenny Berggren; Linn Berggren	Singles of the 90s	1999	
Love in the Ghetto	Jonas "Joker" Berggren	Hidden Gems, Vol. 2	2020	
Lucky Love	Jonas "Joker" Berggren; Billy Steinberg	The Bridge	1995	
Lucky Love 2009	Jonas "Joker" Berggren; Billy Steinberg	Greatest Hits (iTunes edition)	2008	
Make My Day	Jonas "Joker" Berggren	Hidden Gems	2015	
Memories Forever	Jonas "Joker" Berggren; Ulf "Buddha" Ekberg; Jenny Berggren; Linn Berggren	Hidden Gems, Vol. 2	2020	
Mercy Mercy	Ulf "Buddha" Ekberg; John Ballard	Hidden Gems	2015	
Moment of Magic	Jonas "Joker" Berggren; Ulf "Buddha" Ekberg; Linn Berggren; Jenny Berggren	Hidden Gems	2015	
Moogoperator	Jonas "Joker" Berggren; Ulf "Buddha" Ekberg	Happy Nation (Remastered)	2015	
Mr Ace (Demo 1991)	Jonas "Joker" Berggren; Ulf "Buddha" Ekberg	The Sign (Remastered)	2014	
Mr. Replay		The Golden Ratio	2010	
My Déjà Vu	Jonas "Joker" Berggren	The Bridge	1995	
My Mind		Happy Nation; Happy Nation (U.S. Version); The Sign	1992	
Münchhausen (Just Chaos)	Jonas "Joker" Berggren; Ulf "Buddha" Ekberg	Happy Nation	1992	
Never Gonna Say I'm Sorry	Jonas "Joker" Berggren	The Bridge	1995	
No Good Lover	Jonas "Joker" Berggren	Hidden Gems	2015	
One Day		The Golden Ratio	2010	
Ordinary Day	Jonas "Joker" Berggren	Da Capo	2002	
Peepshow (Live in Gothenburg, 1990)	Jonas "Joker" Berggren; Tech Noir	All That She Wants: The Classic Collection	2020	
Perfect World	Ulf "Buddha" Ekberg	The Bridge	1995	
Pole Position	Jonas "Joker" Berggren; Ulf "Buddha" Ekberg; Linn Berggren; Jenny Berggren	Hidden Gems	2015	
Precious		The Golden Ratio	2010	
Prime Time	Jonas "Joker" Berggren	Hidden Gems	2015	
Que Sera	John Ballard; Ulf "Buddha" Ekberg; Björn Stenström	The Bridge	1995	
Ravine		The Bridge	1995	
Reality (In Black and White)	Jonas "Joker" Berggren; Tech Noir	Hidden Gems, Vol. 2	2020	
Remember the Words	Jonas "Joker" Berggren; Anoo Bhagavan; Jonas Von Der Burg; Harry "Slick" Sommerdahl	Da Capo	2002	
Scotch/P. Lion Medley (Live in Gothenburg, 1990)		All That She Wants: The Classic Collection	2020	
She Was Thinking of You	Billy Steinberg; Rick Nowels; China Forbes	Hidden Gems, Vol. 2	2020	
Show Me Love	Jonas "Joker" Berggren	Da Capo	2002	
Southern California		The Golden Ratio	2010	
Stay With Me	Jenny Berggren	Hidden Gems, Vol. 2	2020	
Strange Ways	Linn Berggren	The Bridge	1995	
Stranger to Love	Ulf "Buddha" Ekberg; John Ballard	Hidden Gems, Vol. 2	2020	
Summer Days	Jonas "Joker" Berggren	Da Capo (Japanese edition)	2002	
Sunset in Southern California	Jonas "Joker" Berggren	Hidden Gems	2015	
Sunshine (Live in Gothenburg, 1990)	Jonas "Joker" Berggren; Tech Noir	All That She Wants: The Classic Collection	2020	
The Challenge	Jonas "Joker" Berggren	Hidden Gems, Vol. 2	2020	
The Golden Ratio		The Golden Ratio	2010	
The Juvenile	Jonas "Joker" Berggren	Da Capo	2002	
The Sign	Jonas "Joker" Berggren	Happy Nation (U.S. Version); The Sign	1993	
The Sign (Freedom Bunch Mix)	Jonas "Joker" Berggren	Greatest Hits (Japanese edition)	2008	
The Wizard	Jonas "Joker" Berggren	Hidden Gems, Vol. 2	2020	
Tokyo Girl	Jonas "Joker" Berggren; Ralph McCarthy; Billy Steinberg	Flowers; Cruel Summer	1998	
Told My Ma		The Golden Ratio	2010	
Travel to Romantis	Jonas "Joker" Berggren	Flowers; Cruel Summer	1998	
Unspeakable	Adam Anders; Jonas "Joker" Berggren	Da Capo	2002	
Vamos a la Playa/Don’t You Want Me? (Live in Gothenburg, 1990)		All That She Wants: The Classic Collection	2020	
Vision in Blue		The Golden Ratio	2010	
Voulez-Vous Danser		Happy Nation; Happy Nation (U.S. Version); The Sign	1992	
Waiting for Magic		Happy Nation; Happy Nation (U.S. Version); The Sign	1992	
Wave Wet Sand		The Bridge	1995	
What's the Name of the Game	Jenny Berggren; Jonas "Joker" Berggren; Linn Berggren; Jonas Von Der Burg; Harry "Slick" Sommerdahl	Da Capo	2002	
Wheel of Fortune	Jonas "Joker" Berggren; Ulf "Buddha" Ekberg	Happy Nation; Happy Nation (U.S. Version); The Sign	1992	
Wheel of Fortune 2009	Jonas "Joker" Berggren; Ulf "Buddha" Ekberg	Greatest Hits	2008	
Whenever You're Near Me	Jonas "Joker" Berggren	Cruel Summer	1998	
Whispers in Blindness	Linn Berggren	The Bridge	1995	
Who Am I?		The Golden Ratio	2010	
Wish You Were Mine	Jonas "Joker" Berggren; Jenny Berggren; Ulf "Buddha" Ekberg; Jakob Petrén	Hidden Gems, Vol. 2	2020	
Wonderful Life	Black	Da Capo	2002	
World Down Under	Jonas "Joker" Berggren; Jonas Von Der Burg; Harry "Slick" Sommerdahl	Da Capo	2002	
Would You Believe	Jonas "Joker" Berggren	Hidden Gems	2015	
You and I		The Bridge	1995	
Young and Proud		Happy Nation; Happy Nation (U.S. Version); The Sign	1992	

== Ace Thursdays ==
Beginning on March 3, 2011, the band has released different demo tracks and alternative versions of released and unreleased songs on their Facebook page on certain Thursdays for free. Some of them were later officially released in the 2015 album Hidden Gems.

- "A Million Ways" (February 28, 2013)
- "All Temptations" (November 10, 2011)
- "At The Borderline" (October 27, 2011)
- "Barfly" (July 7, 2011)
- "Beautiful Life" (Instrumental Choir Version) (March 24, 2011)
- "Beautiful Morning" (Original Production) (March 17, 2011)
- "Blah Blah Blah" (Remix) (October 11, 2012)
- "Bodyhouse" (Edited Version) (September 27, 2012)
- "Cecilia" (Ole Evenrude Playback) (November 17, 2011)
- "Change with the Light" (Original Instrumental) (November 10, 2011)
- "Change with the Light" (Original Production) (March 10, 2011)
- "Close to You" (Remix) (November 29, 2012)
- "Come to Me" (March 24, 2011)
- "Come to Me" (Early Instrumental) (March 3, 2011)
- "Cuba Cuba Libre" (March 24, 2011)
- "Cuba Cuba Libre" (d'Cats Reggae Version) (November 17, 2011)
- "Cuba Cuba Libre" (Second Version) (September 27, 2012)
- "Cruel Summer" (Original Version) (July 7, 2011)
- "Cruel Summer" (TOTP Version) (April 14, 2011)
- "Da Capo" (Original Version) (March 17, 2011)
- "Dancer In A Daydream" (Instrumental) (October 27, 2011)
- "Don't Turn Around" (TOTP Instrumental) (April 7, 2011)
- "Dr. Sun" (Instrumental) (November 17, 2011)
- "End Of This World" (March 31, 2011)
- "Funk Funk" (February 28, 2013)
- "Girl in the Line" (March 3, 2011)
- "Giving It Up" (March 10, 2011)
- "Giving It Up" (Alternate Version) (April 7, 2011)
- "Go Go Go, Dr. Beat" (March 10, 2011)
- "Go Go Go, Dr. Beat" (Second version) (April 14, 2011)
- "Hallo Hallo" (Demo Version) (March 31, 2011)
- "Hey Sorry" (d'Cats Version) (April 14, 2011)
- "Hipnotize" (April 14, 2011)
- "For a Thousand Days" (March 10, 2011)
- "Juliet" (Unreleased Version) (February 28, 2013)
- "Killer On The Rampage" (March 31, 2011)
- "Kyrie Eleisson" (October 27, 2011)
- "L'Amour" (Original Version) (March 17, 2011)
- "Learn How to Fly" (d'Cats Version) (October 11, 2012)
- "Look Around Me" (February 28, 2013)
- "Love in December" (Alternate Version) (March 3, 2011)
- "Love in December" (Original Version) (November 3, 2011)
- "Love in the Barrio" (d'Cats version) (April 14, 2011)
- "Love in the Barrio" (April 14, 2011)
- "Love in the Ghetto" (July 7, 2011)
- "Memories Forever" (July 7, 2011)
- "Memories Forever" (Alternate Version) (November 3, 2011)
- "Moment of Magic" (April 7, 2011)
- "Moment of Magic" (Slow Version) (March 3, 2011)
- "My Déjà Vu" (Instrumental) (March 10, 2011)
- "Never Gonna Say I'm Sorry" (I'm Like a Clown Extended Bit) (April 7, 2011)
- "Never Gonna Say I'm Sorry" (First Day Instrumental) (April 14, 2011)
- "No Good Lover" (Demo Version) (March 17, 2011)
- "One Day" (Remix) (October 11, 2012)
- "Opposites Attract" (July 7, 2011)
- "Pole Position" (November 10, 2011)
- "Reality (In Black and White)" (November 10, 2011)
- "Scared Boys" (November 3, 2011)
- "Sharpshooter" (Remix) (November 29, 2012)
- "She Was Thinking of You" (March 31, 2011)
- "Shoot Me (With a Camera)" (November 10, 2011)
- "Show Me Love" (First Ace Version) (April 14, 2011)
- "Sunset in Southern California" (December 29, 2011)
- "The Challenge" (March 24, 2011)
- "The Duel" (March 10, 2011)
- "The Golden Eye" (Meja Version) (April 7, 2011)
- "The Wizard" (November 3, 2011)
- "Tho Tho Thoa" (d'Cats Version) (February 28, 2013)
- "Unspeakable" (Choir Version) (April 14, 2011)
- "Vida Hermosa" (April 7, 2011)
- "Vision in Blue" (Demo Version) (September 27, 2012)
- "Walk Like a Man" (March 31, 2011)
- "What's The Name Of The Game" (Cowboy Lyrics Version) (April 14, 2011)
- "Wheel of Fortune" (1991 Original Version) (November 29, 2012)
- "World Down Under" (Fast Version) (March 17, 2011)
- "Would You Believe" (March 24, 2011)
- "Would You Believe" (d'Cats Version) (March 3, 2011)
- "Would You Believe" (Summer Version) (March 24, 2011)

== Live songs ==
- "All You Need Is Love" (Night of The Proms, 2005)
- "Nazad, Nazad Mome Kalino" (Lovech, Bulgaria, 2008)
- "Sång" (Princess Victoria's 20th birthday, 1997)
- "Vårvindar Friska" (Viña del Mar Festival, 1996)
