= Beautiful Life: The Singles =

Box set by Ace of Base
- Released: 28 April 2023
- Recorded: 1990–2023
- Genre: Pop
- Label: Edsel

Ace of Base chronology
All That She Wants: The Classic Collection (2020)	Beautiful Life: The Singles (2023)

Beautiful Life: The Singles is a commemorative box set by the Swedish pop group Ace of Base. The 26-CD box set contains every commercial and promotional CD single released from the group's first four studio albums, Happy Nation / The Sign (1992/1993), The Bridge (1995), Flowers / Cruel Summer (1998), and Da Capo (2002). Each disc comes with previously unreleased material, including brand new remixes commissioned specifically for the release. It was released under the label Edsel by the Demon Music Group on 28 April 2023 in the UK.

== Background ==
Following the release of All That She Wants: The Classic Collection (2020), a 30th anniversary commemorate box set containing remastered versions of the group's first four studio albums, work began on a singles box set. The group began releasing new one-off singles in 2020, 2021 and 2023 for songs such as "All That She Wants" "Happy Nation" "Beautiful Life", "Wheel of Fortune", "Always Have, Always Will", and "Dancer in a Daydream" remixed by various producers. These remixes would go on to be included in the box set, along with physical versions of the previous digital-only releases All That She Wants (Remixed) and "Would You Believe", as well as promotional singles such as "My Déjà Vu" and "Love in December". Six photo cards depicting alternative North American cover art for some of the singles are also included.

== Critical reception ==
Classic Pop magazine gave the box set four stars stating, "Beautiful Life: The Singles makes a good case for Ace of Base's status as dancefloor dominators."

== Track listing ==
CD1: "Wheel of Fortune"

1. "Wheel of Fortune" (7" Mix) – 3:41
2. "My Mind" (Dance Mix) – 4:19
3. "Wheel of Fortune" (12" Mix) – 5:25
4. "Wheel of Fortune" (Club Mix) – 4:38
5. "Wheel of Fortune" (Original Club Mix) – 3:59
6. "Wheel of Fortune" (Original Demo) – 3:53
7. "Wheel of Fortune" (2009) – 3:42
8. "Wheel of Fortune" (2009 Club Mix) – 5:24
9. "Wheel of Fortune" (2009 Radio Edit) – 3:21
10. "Wheel of Fortune" (Singlewave Remix) – 3:44
11. "Wheel of Fortune" (Singlewave Instrumental) – 3:44
12. "Wheel of Fortune" (Instrumental) – 3:50

CD2: "All That She Wants"

1. "All That She Wants" (Radio Edit) – 3:31
2. "Fashion Party" (Dance Mix) – 4:14
3. "All That She Wants" (Bhangra Version) – 4:14
4. "All That She Wants" (12" Version) – 6:46
5. "All That She Wants" (Madness Version) – 3:32
6. "All That She Wants" (Madness Dub) – 4:01
7. "All That She Wants" [12" Bhangra Intro) – 7:29
8. "All That She Wants" (Extended Single/Dub) – 7:36
9. "Mr. Ace" (Demo 1991) – 3:21
10. "All That She Wants" (Instrumental) – 3:30

CD3: "Happy Nation"

1. "Happy Nation" (Radio Edit) – 3:32
2. "Happy Nation" (7" Gold Zone Edit) – 3:46
3. "Happy Nation" (12" Version) – 6:39
4. "Happy Nation" (Gold Zone Club Mix) – 5:40
5. "Happy Nation" (Moody Gold Mix) – 3:59
6. "Happy Nation" (Gold Dub Edit) – 4:35
7. "Happy Nation" (Album Version) – 4:10
8. "Happy Nation" (Dzintars Leja Remix) – 3:50
9. "Happy Nation" (Agentssmith Dark Dub) – 4:41
10. "Happy Nation" (Fred & Mykos Radio Remix) – 2:59
11. "Happy Nation" (Fred & Mykos Remix) – 3:58
12. "Happy Nation" (Fred & Mykos Dub Mix) – 3:58
13. "Happy Nation" (Trace Adam Remix) – 3:48
14. "Happy Nation" (Trace Adam Instrumental) – 3:47
15. "Happy Nation" (Radio Instrumental) – 4:32

CD4: "Waiting for Magic"

1. "Waiting for Magic" (Radio Edit) – 3:33
2. "Waiting for Magic" (Total Remix 7" Version) – 3:49
3. "Waiting for Magic" (Total Remix 12" Version) – 6:26
4. "Waiting for Magic" (Total Remix Instrumental) – 4:55
5. "Waiting for Magic" (Album Version) – 5:17
6. "Waiting for Magic" (Singlewave's Awakening Mix) – 4:16
7. "Waiting for Magic" (Singlewave's Awakening Club Mix) – 7:42
8. "Waiting for Magic" (Singlewave's Awakening Instrumental) – 4:16
9. "Waiting for Magic" (Singlewave's Awakening Club Instrumental) – 7:42

CD5: "The Sign"

1. "The Sign" (Radio Edit) – 3:09
2. "Young and Proud" – 3:55
3. "The Sign" (Long Version) – 4:43
4. "The Sign" (Dub Version) – 5:09
5. "The Sign" (The Remix) – 5:40
6. "The Sign" (Ultimix) – 6:46
7. "The Sign" (Luke Mornay S.O.S Mix) – 3:26
8. "The Sign" (Luke Mornay S.O.S 12" Mix) – 5:00
9. "The Sign" (Luke Mornay S.O.S Instrumental) – 3:26
10. "The Sign" (Luke Mornay S.O.S 12" Instrumental) – 5:00
11. "The Sign" (Project K Acid-Base Mix) – 3:15
12. "The Sign" (Project K Acid-Base 12" Mix) – 5:38
13. "The Sign" (Project K Acid-Base Instrumental) – 3:15
14. "The Sign" (Luca Debonaire & Xenia Ghali Radio Edit) – 3:09
15. "The Sign" (Luca Debonaire & Xenia Ghali Clubmix) – 4:09
16. "The Sign" (Radio Instrumental) – 3:09

CD6: "Don't Turn Around"

1. "Don't Turn Around" (7" Aswad Mix) – 4:21
2. "Dancer in a Daydream" – 3:37
3. "Don't Turn Around" (Album Version) – 3:48
4. "Don't Turn Around" (Stretch Version) – 5:55
5. "Don't Turn Around" (12" Aswad Mix) – 6:40
6. "Don't Turn Around" (Groove Mix Extended) – 5:19
7. "Don't Turn Around" (Radio Groove Mix) – 3:43
8. "Don't Turn Around" (Turned Out EuroDub) – 7:24
9. "Don't Turn Around" (New Version) – 3:38
10. "Don't Turn Around" (Luke Mornay Vintage Mix) – 3:41
11. "Don't Turn Around" (Luke Mornay Vintage 12" Mix) – 7:07
12. "Don't Turn Around" (Luke Mornay Vintage Instrumental) – 7:07
13. "Don't Turn Around" (Trace Adam Remix) – 3:42
14. "Dancer in a Daydream" (Singlewave's Mirage Mix) – 3:13
15. "Dancer in a Daydream" (Mike & Jonas's Robodisco Dub) – 3:53
16. "Dancer in a Daydream" (Mike Ross Disco Experience) – 6:10

CD7: "Living in Danger"

1. "Living in Danger" (Single Edit) – 3:11
2. "Living in Danger" (Album Version (Edit) – 3:21
3. "Living in Danger" (New Buddha Version) – 3:37
4. "Living in Danger" (Old School Mix) – 4:56
5. "Living in Danger" (Old School Mix (Short Version) – 3:41
6. "Living in Danger" (D-House Mix (Short Version) – 4:03
7. "Living in Danger" (D-House Instrumental) – 5:56
8. "Living in Danger" (Principle Mix) – 8:51
9. "Living in Danger" (Principle Mix (Edit) – 5:01
10. "Living in Danger" (Silk Mix) – 4:38
11. "Living in Danger" (For The Big Clubs Mix) – 10:18
12. "Living in Danger" (Armand's Bubble Dub) – 4:14
13. "Living in Danger" (New Edit) – 3:12
14. "Living in Danger" (T.O.E.C. Version) – 4:30
15. "Living in Danger" (Original Demo) – 4:11
16. "Living in Danger" (Album Instrumental) – 3:46

CD8: "Lucky Love"

1. "Lucky Love" (Original Version) – 2:52
2. "Lucky Love" (Acoustic Version) – 2:52
3. "Lucky Love" (Raggasol Version) – 2:53
4. "Lucky Love" (Extended Original Version) – 4:50
5. "Lucky Love" (Amadin Remix) – 5:40
6. "Lucky Love" (Frankie Knuckles Edit) – 3:41
7. "Lucky Love" (Frankie Knuckles Classic Instrumental) – 4:12
8. "Lucky Love" (Vission Lorimer Edit) – 3:36
9. "Lucky Love" (Vission Lorimer Funkdified Mix) – 6:02
10. "Lucky Love" (Lenny B's Club Mix) – 7:08
11. "Lucky Love" (Lenny B's Unreleased Mix) – 7:16
12. "Lucky Love" (Armand's British Nites Remix) – 11:22
13. "Lucky Love" (Sean Diaz Remix) – 6:33
14. "Lucky Love" (Matt Pop 2023 Remix) – 2:46
15. "Lucky Love" (Matt Pop 2023 Club Mix) – 4:51
16. "Lucky Love" (Matt Pop 2023 Instrumental) – 2:46

CD9: "Beautiful Life"

1. "Beautiful Life" (Single Version) – 3:38
2. "Beautiful Life" (12" Extended Version) – 5:46
3. "Beautiful Life" (Vission Lorimer Radio Edit) – 4:45
4. "Beautiful Life" (Humpty Vission Lorimer Anthem Edit) – 3:38
5. "Beautiful Life" (Vission Lorimer Club Mix) – 7:00
6. "Beautiful Life" (Junior's Circuit Bump Edit) – 3:41
7. "Beautiful Life" (Junior's Circuit Bump Mix) – 8:20
8. "Beautiful Life" (Junior's Circuit Bump Dub) – 5:42
9. "Beautiful Life" (Lenny B's Edit) – 3:47
10. "Beautiful Life" (Lenny B's House Of Joy Club Mix) – 6:55
11. "Beautiful Life" (Uno Clio Mix) – 8:18
12. "Beautiful Life" (Uno Clio Downtown Mix) – 7:57
13. "Beautiful Life" (Cheiron 12" Re-Edit) – 6:45

CD10: "Never Gonna Say I'm Sorry"

1. "Never Gonna Say I'm Sorry" (Short Version) – 3:14
2. "Never Gonna Say I'm Sorry" (Long Version) – 6:32
3. "Never Gonna Say I'm Sorry" (Rock Version) – 4:00
4. "Never Gonna Say I'm Sorry" (Sweetbox Radio Edit) – 3:17
5. "Never Gonna Say I'm Sorry" (Sweetbox Funky Mix) – 6:46
6. "Never Gonna Say I'm Sorry" (Sweetbox Instrumental) – 6:43
7. "Never Gonna Say I'm Sorry" (Lenny B's Radio Mix) – 4:11
8. "Never Gonna Say I'm Sorry" (Lenny B's Club Mix) – 8:24
9. "Never Gonna Say I'm Sorry" (Lenny B's Organ-ic House Mix) – 7:15
10. "Never Gonna Say I'm Sorry" (Lenny B's Club Instrumental) – 8:24
11. "Never Gonna Say I'm Sorry" (Turbine Mix) – 5:27
12. "Never Gonna Say I'm Sorry" (Turbine Dub) – 6:28
13. "Never Gonna Say I'm Sorry" (Singlewave Radio Mix) – 2:54
14. "Never Gonna Say I'm Sorry" (Singlewave Remix) – 4:51

CD11: "My Déjà Vu"

1. "My Déjà Vu (Luke Mornay Radio Remix) – 3:50
2. "My Déjà Vu (Album Version) – 3:38
3. "Angel Eyes" – 3:12
4. "My Déjà Vu" (Luke Mornay En Cœur Mix) – 7:19
5. "My Déjà Vu" (Luke Mornay Encore Dub) – 6:17
6. "My Déjà Vu" (Luke Mornay Radio Instrumental) – 3:50
7. "My Déjà Vu" (Luke Mornay En Cœur Instrumental) – 7:19
8. "My Déjà Vu" (Original Extended Version) – 5:52
9. "My Déjà Vu" (Alternative Mix) – 3:05
10. "My Déjà Vu" (Alternative 12" Mix) – 5:49
11. "My Déjà Vu" (Alternative Instrumental) – 3:04
12. "My Déjà Vu" (Original Album Version) – 3:20
13. "My Déjà Vu" (Original Instrumental) – 3:37
14. "Angel Eyes" (Instrumental) – 3:28

CD12: "Life Is a Flower"

1. "Life Is a Flower" (Original Version) – 3:44
2. "No Good Lover" – 3:53
3. "Life Is a Flower" (Extended Version) – 5:44
4. "Life Is a Flower" (Reggae Version) – 3:32
5. "Life Is a Flower" (SoulPoets Night Club Mix) – 5:20
6. "Life Is a Flower" (SoulPoets Instrumental) – 3:59
7. "Life Is a Flower" (Sweetbox Mix) – 6:15
8. "Life Is a Flower" (Absolom Remix) – 7:43
9. "Life Is a Flower" (Absolom Short Edit) – 5:17
10. "Life Is a Flower" (Milk Inc. Long Edit) – 5:12
11. "Life Is a Flower" (Milk Inc. UHT Radio Mix) – 3:41
12. "Life Is a Flower" (Milk Inc. Long Instrumental) – 5:12
13. "Life Is a Flower" (Milk Inc. UHT Instrumental) – 3:40
14. "Life Is a Flower" (Alternative Edit) – 3:33
15. "No Good Lover" (Alternative Mix) – 3:03
16. "Life Is a Flower" (Instrumental) – 3:43
17. "No Good Lover" (Alternative Instrumental) – 3:52

CD13: "Cruel Summer"

1. "Cruel Summer" (Cutfather & Joe Mix) – 3:33
2. "Cruel Summer" (Big Bonus Mix) – 4:05
3. "Cruel Summer" (Radio Version) – 3:27
4. "Cruel Summer" (Hartmann & Langhoff Short Mix) – 3:21
5. "Cruel Summer" (SoulPoets House Bust Mix) – 3:40
6. "Cruel Summer" (KLM Club Mix) – 10:27
7. "Cruel Summer" (KLM Dub 1) – 9:42
8. "Cruel Summer" (KLM Short Dub 2) – 3:38
9. "Cruel Summer" (KLM Beats) – 3:20
10. "Cruel Summer" (Hani Radio Mix) – 3:31
11. "Cruel Summer" (Hani Dub) – 8:12
12. "Cruel Summer" (Garage Mix Vocal Up) Feat – Alliage – 3:50
13. "Cruel Summer" (Dub) Feat – Alliage – 5:59
14. "Cruel Summer" (Cutfather & Joe Mix - Mix Out Ending) – 4:22
15. "Cruel Summer: (Cutfather & Joe Acappella) – 3:30
16. "Cruel Summer" (Cutfather & Joe Instrumental) – 3:32

CD14: "Whenever You're Near Me"

1. "Whenever You're Near Me" (Album Version) – 3:31
2. "He Decides" – 3:48
3. "Donnie" – 3:46
4. "Whenever You're Near Me" (Strobe's Radio Remix) – 3:20
5. "Whenever You're Near Me" (Strobe's Lollipop Mix) – 3:24
6. "Whenever You're Near Me" (Strobe's Subway Mix) – 3:16
7. "Whenever You're Near Me" (DJ Strobe's Unreleased Club Mix) – 3:02
8. "Whenever You're Near Me" (Strobe's Instrumental) – 3:20
9. "Whenever You're Near Me" (Nikolas & Sibley Dance Radio Edit) – 3:40
10. "Whenever You're Near Me" (Nikolas & Sibley Dance Mix) – 8:52
11. "Whenever You're Near Me" (Giuseppe D's Radio Remix) – 3:21
12. "Whenever You're Near Me" (Giuseppe D's Extended Remix) – 4:39
13. "Whenever You're Near Me" (Album Instrumental) – 3:52
14. "Donnie" – (Instrumental) – 3:41

CD15: "Travel to Romantis"

1. "Travel to Romantis" – 4:08
2. "Tokyo Girl" – 3:34
3. "Travel to Romantis" (Wolf Mix) – 4:01
4. "Travel to Romantis" (Larossi Mix) – 4:10
5. "Travel to Romantis" (Larossi Extended Mix) – 5:33
6. "Travel to Romantis" (Larossi Instrumental) – 4:10
7. "Travel to Romantis" (Love To Infinity Mix) – 3:34
8. "Travel to Romantis" (Love To Infinity Master Mix) – 7:21
9. "Travel to Romantis" (Love To Infinity Indian Tonic Mix) – 7:42
10. "Travel to Romantis" (Love To Infinity Instrumental) – 7:21
11. "Travel to Romantis" (Love To Infinity Indian Tonic Instrumental) – 7:42
12. "Travel to Romantis" (Radio Edit Faded Version) – 3:43
13. "End of This World" (Original Demo For "Tokyo Girl") – 3:28
14. "Tokyo Girl" (Mike Ross 2023 Remix) – 4:41
15. "Travel to Romantis" (Album Instrumental) – 4:08
16. "Tokyo Girl" (Instrumental) – 3:34

CD16: "Always Have, Always Will"

1. "Always Have, Always Will" – 3:44
2. "Mercy, Mercy" – 3:36
3. "Love for Sale" – 3:34
4. "Captain Nemo" – 4:00
5. "Always Have, Always Will" (Matt Pop 2020 Radio Remix) – 3:51
6. "Always Have, Always Will" (Matt Pop 2020 Remix) – 5:58
7. "Always Have, Always Will" (Matt Pop 2020 Instrumental) – 5:58
8. "Always Have, Always Will" (Edit) – 3:47
9. "Killer on the Rampage" (Original Demo For "Always Have, Always Will") – 3:54
10. "Captain Nemo" (Original Demo) – 4:00
11. "Always Have, Always Will" (Instrumental) – 3:56

CD17: "Everytime It Rains"

1. "Everytime It Rains" (Radio Edit) – 3:55
2. "Into the Night of Blue" – 4:10
3. "Everytime It Rains" (Metro Club Mix) – 7:07
4. "Everytime It Rains" (Metro Radio Mix) – 4:15
5. "Everytime It Rains" (Metro Radio Edit) – 4:16
6. "Everytime It Rains" (SoulPoets Club Mix) – 4:20
7. "Everytime It Rains" (TKC Radio Edit) – 4:23
8. "Everytime It Rains" (That Kid Chris 2000 Club Mix) – 10:31
9. "Everytime It Rains" (That Kid Chris Dub) – 9:07
10. "Everytime It Rains" (Karmadelic Radio Mix) – 4:16
11. "Everytime It Rains" (Karmadelic Club Mix) – 8:55
12. "Everytime It Rains" (C&J Dub/Beats & Pieces) – 4:50
13. "Everytime It Rains" (Instrumental) – 4:50

CD18: "Cecilia"

1. "Cecilia" (Ole Evenrude Radio Mix) – 3:30
2. "Cecilia" (Ole Evenrude Mix) – 3:37
3. "Cecilia" (Ole Evenrude Extended Mix) – 4:33
4. "Cecilia" (In Da Nite) – 4:08
5. "Cecilia" (In Da Nite Extended) – 5:05
6. "Cecilia" (L&J Slow Down) – 3:34
7. "Cecilia" (Album Version) – 3:53
8. "Cecilia (Ole Evenrude Instrumental) – 3:30

CD19: "C'est La Vie (Always 21)"

1. "C'est La Vie (Always 21)" (Radio Version) – 3:26
2. "Megamix" (Short Version) – 3:24
3. "C'est La Vie (Always 21)" (Remix) – 3:55
4. "C'est La Vie (Always 21)" (Shaft Radio Edit) – 3:57
5. "C'est La Vie (Always 21)" (Shaft Club Mix) – 5:01
6. "C'est La Vie (Always 21)" (Shaft Dub Mix) – 5:00
7. "C'est La Vie (Always 21)" (Sleazesisters Anthem Mix) – 7:32
8. "C'est La Vie (Always 21)" (Sleazesisters Instrumental) – 7:32
9. "C'est La Vie (Always 21)" (Tuff Twins Mix) – 7:22
10. "C'est La Vie (Always 21)" (Tuff Twins Instrumental) – 7:22
11. "C'est La Vie (Always 21)" (Skeewiff's Full Biffter) – 4:16
12. "C'est La Vie (Always 21)" (Skeewiff's Fancy Dub) – 4:46
13. "C'est La Vie (Always 21)" (Original Demo) – 3:46
14. "Megamix" (Long Version) – 7:19

CD20: "Love in December"

1. "Love in December" (Radio Edit) – 3:29
2. "Ace of Clubs" (Project K MegaRemix) – 12:52
3. "Love in December" (Alternative Disco Version) – 3:34
4. "Love in December" (Album Version) – 3:59
5. "Love in December" (Original Demo) – 4:00
6. "Ace of Clubs" (Project K MegaRemix Instrumental) – 12:49

CD21: "Hallo Hallo"

1. "Hallo Hallo" (Radio Version) – 2:50
2. "Hallo Hallo" (Hitvision Radio Edit) – 3:05
3. "Hallo Hallo" (Album Version) – 2:51
4. "Hallo Hallo" (Dub) – 4:46
5. "Hallo Hallo" (XTM Full Remix) – 6:12
6. "Hallo Hallo" (XTM Dub Remix) – 6:05
7. "Hallo Hallo" (XTM Radio Remix) – 3:58
8. "Hallo Hallo" (TrinityBoys Version) – 3:22
9. "Hallo Hallo" (1998 Version) – 3:17
10. "Hallo Hallo" (C&J Master Mix) – 3:43
11. "Hallo Hallo" (C&J Instrumental) – 3:43
12. "Hallo Hallo" (C&J Dub/Beats & Pieces) – 3:21
13. "Hallo Hallo" (Alternative Version) – 3:28
14. "Hallo Hallo" (Alternative Instrumental) – 3:28

CD22: "Beautiful Morning"

1. "Beautiful Morning" (Radio Version) – 2:59
2. "Remember The Words" (Original Version) – 3:15
3. "Beautiful Morning" (Groove Radio Edit) – 2:46
4. "Beautiful Morning" (Extended Version) – 4:56
5. "Beautiful Morning" (Spanish Fly Radio Edit) – 2:57
6. "Beautiful Morning" (Spanish Fly Club Version) – 5:15
7. "Beautiful Morning" (Alternative Version) – 3:34
8. "Beautiful Morning" (Radio Instrumental) – 2:59
9. "Beautiful Morning" (Groove Instrumental) – 2:46
10. "Beautiful Morning" (Extended Instrumental) – 4:56
11. "Remember the Words" (Original Instrumental) – 3:15

CD23: "The Juvenile"

1. "The Juvenile" (Project K Soundtrack) – 3:31
2. "The Juvenile" (Album Version) – 3:43
3. "What's the Name of the Game" – 3:02
4. "Hey Darling" – 3:20
5. "The Juvenile" (Project K Director's Cut) – 9:22
6. "The Juvenile" (Project K Delinquent Dub) – 8:09
7. "The Juvenile" (Project K Orchestrappella) – 2:53
8. "The Juvenile" (Project K Instrumental) – 3:31
9. "What's the Name of the Game" (Original Version) – 3:01
10. "The Juvenile" (Album Instrumental) – 3:43

CD24: "Unspeakable"

1. "Unspeakable" (Radio Edit) – 3:12
2. "Don't Stop" – 3:48
3. "Unspeakable" (Junk & Function/M12 Radio Mix) – 3:05
4. "Unspeakable" (Junk & Function/M12 Club Mix) – 5:23
5. "Unspeakable" (Fairlite Radio Mix) – 3:18
6. "Unspeakable" (Fairlite Dub Mix) – 6:47
7. "Unspeakable" (Fairlite Instrumental) – 6:47
8. "Unspeakable" (Filur Radio Mix) – 3:28
9. "Unspeakable" (Filur Club Remix) – 5:25
10. "Unspeakable" (Filur Dub Mix) – 5:57
11. "Unspeakable" (Choir Version) – 3:37
12. "Unspeakable" (Radio Instrumental) – 3:13

CD25: "Would You Believe"

1. "Would You Believe" (Matt Pop 2023 Radio Mix) – 3:12
2. "Would You Believe" (Project K's Night At 54 Mix) – 3:16
3. "Would You Believe" (Album Version) – 2:46
4. "Would You Believe" (Matt Pop 2023 Extended Version) – 5:00
5. "Would You Believe" (Matt Pop 2023 Instrumental) – 3:09
6. "Would You Believe" (Matt Pop 2023 Extended Instrumental) – 5:00
7. "Would You Believe" (Project K's All Night At 54 Mix) – 6:54
8. "Would You Believe" (Project K's Danceteria Dub) – 6:00
9. "Would You Believe" (Project K's Night At 54 Orchestrappella) – 3:12
10. "Would You Believe" (Project K's Night At 54 Instrumental) – 3:16
11. "Would You Believe" (Alternative Version) – 3:05

CD26: "All That She Wants (Remixed)"

1. "All That She Wants" (Project K Acid-Base Mix) – 3:47
2. "All That She Wants" (Snbrn X Klatch Remix) – 5:58
3. "All That She Wants" (Moombahteam Remix) – 3:12
4. "All That She Wants" (Mowlo Remix) – 3:07
5. "All That She Wants" (A Spitzenklasse Remix) – 3:40
6. "All That She Wants" (Wideboys Stadium Vocal) – 6:56
7. "All That She Wants" (Funkstar De Luxe Club Remix) – 8:06
8. "All That She Wants" (Funkstar De Luxe Cook N Curry Remix Extended) – 4:51
9. "All That She Wants" (We Are Legends Remix) – 6:17
10. "All That She Wants" (Bali Bandits Remix Extended) – 6:01
11. "All That She Wants" (JoeySuki Remix) – 4:51
12. "All That She Wants" (Andalo Remix Extended) – 5:40
13. "All That She Wants" (House Of Titans Remix) – 3:54
14. "All That She Wants" (Marc MacRowland Remix) – 6:00
15. "All That She Wants" (Project K Acid-Base 12 Inch Mix) – 6:24

== Release history ==
Region	Date	Format
UK	28 April 2023	CD
Worldwide	28 April 2023	Digital download; streaming
