= All That She Wants: The Classic Collection =

Box set by Ace of Base
- Released: 3 July 2020
- Recorded: 1990–2008
- Genre: Pop
- Label: Edsel

Ace of Base chronology
Gold (2019)	All That She Wants: The Classic Collection (2020)	Beautiful Life: The Singles (2023)

Cover of Hidden Gems, Vol. 2
- Hidden Gems, Vol. 2 (new compilation album included in the box set)

All That She Wants: The Classic Collection is a commemorative box set by the Swedish pop group Ace of Base. The set was released under the label Edsel by the Demon Music Group on 3 July 2020 in the UK. The release coincides with the band's 30th anniversary.

== Background ==
The set was released as an 11-CD+DVD set and 4-LP coloured vinyl compilation. The CD/DVD set includes expanded versions of the group's original four studio albums and the 2015 compilation album Hidden Gems, Hidden Gems, Vol. 2 – a new follow-up to the original Hidden Gems –, a new EP, and a DVD with all music videos and bonus material; the LP set only includes the studio albums reissued on 180-gram vinyl. The CDs contain previously unreleased material, including live recordings of the group's first live performance in their hometown of Gothenburg in 1990. It also includes remixes of the shelved 1996 single, "Edge of Heaven". The liner notes were compiled by U.S. journalist and music critic Fred Bronson. Hidden Gems, Vol. 2 was sent to streaming platforms 28 August 2020.

== Critical reception ==
In the UK, Duncan Seaman of Classic Pop magazine called the album "lavish", stating that the band's legacy would be cemented with the box set.

The Second Disc said in their review: "If you only know them from their biggest hits like The Sign and Don't Turn Around, there is a lot of worthwhile exploration in this box between the audio, video and expansive liner notes from Billboard's Fred Bronson which should be the final word on this era of group."

== Commercial performance ==
The album entered the UK's official charts, at #79 on Physical Album Sales and #98 on Album Sales.

== Track listing ==
Happy Nation – U.S. version — CD 1
No.	Title	Lyrics	Music	Producer(s)	Length
1.	"All That She Wants"	Joker; Buddha	Joker; Buddha	Joker; Buddha; Denniz Pop	3:30
2.	"Don't Turn Around"	Albert Hammond; Diane Warren	Hammond; Warren	Tommy Ekman; Per Adebratt	3:48
3.	"Young and Proud"	Joker; Buddha	Joker; Buddha	Joker; Buddha	3:56
4.	"The Sign"	Joker	Joker	Joker; Denniz Pop; Douglas Carr; Buddha	3:08
5.	"Living in Danger"	Joker; Buddha	Joker; Buddha	Ekman; Adebratt; T.O.E.C.	3:41
6.	"Voulez-Vous Danser"	Joker; Buddha	Joker; Buddha	T.O.E.C.; Joker; Buddha	3:17
7.	"Happy Nation"	Joker; Buddha	Joker; Buddha	Joker; Buddha	4:13
8.	"Hear Me Calling"	Linn; Jenny	Joker; Buddha; Linn; Jenny	Buddha; Stonestream; John Ballard	3:48
9.	"Waiting for Magic" (Total Remix 7")	Joker; Buddha	Joker; Buddha	Buddha; Stonestream	3:50
10.	"Fashion Party"	Joker; Buddha	Joker; Buddha	Joker	4:10
11.	"Wheel of Fortune"	Joker; Buddha	Joker; Buddha	Joker; Buddha; T.O.E.C.	3:52
12.	"Dancer in a Daydream"	Joker; Buddha	Joker; Buddha	Joker; Buddha	3:37
13.	"My Mind" (Mindless Mix)	Joker; Buddha	Joker; Buddha	Joker; Buddha	4:08
14.	"Münchhausen (Just Chaos!)"		Joker; Buddha	Joker; Buddha	3:26
15.	"Dimension of Depth"	N/A	Joker	Joker; Buddha	1:46
16.	"Wheel of Fortune" (12" Mix)	Joker; Buddha	Joker; Buddha	T.O.E.C.; Joker; Buddha	5:25
17.	"All That She Wants" (12" Mix)	Joker; Buddha	Joker; Buddha	T.O.E.C.; Joker; Buddha	6:46
18.	"Happy Nation" (12" Mix)	Joker; Buddha	Joker; Buddha	T.O.E.C.; Joker; Buddha	6:39
19.	"The Sign" (Long Version)	Joker	Joker	Joker; Pop; Carr; Buddha	4:43

Happy Nation – U.S. version — CD 2
No.	Title	Lyrics	Music	Producer(s)	Length
1.	"Don't Turn Around" (12" Aswad Mix)	Hammond; Warren		Aswad	6:41
2.	"Living in Danger" (D-House Mix Long Version)	Joker; Buddha		David Morales	10:05
3.	"Wheel of Fortune" (Club Mix)	Joker; Buddha		Joker; Buddha	4:39
4.	"Waiting for Magic" (Original version)	Joker; Buddha		Stenström; Ballard	5:18
5.	"Happy Nation" (Gold Zone Club Mix)	Joker; Buddha		Carr; Ekman	5:41
6.	"Living in Danger" (Lenny B's Dangerous House Mix)	Joker; Buddha		Lenny Bertoldo	6:22
7.	"All That She Wants" (Madness Mix)	Joker; Buddha			3:32
8.	"Waiting for Magic" (Total Remix 12")	Joker; Buddha	Joker; Buddha	Buddha; Stonestream	6:27
9.	"Living in Danger" (Hurley's Deephouse Dub)	Joker; Buddha		Steve "Silk" Hurley	6:40
10.	"The Sign" (The Remix)	Joker		PoP; Carr; Joker	5:41
11.	"Don't Turn Around" (Turned Out Eurodub)	Hammond; Warren		Richie Jones	7:24
12.	"Living in Danger" (Morales House Dub)	Joker; Buddha		Morales	9:22

The Bridge — CD 3
No.	Title	Lyrics	Music	Producer(s)	Length
1.	"Beautiful Life"	Jonas "Joker" Berggren; John Ballard	Joker	Pop; Max Martin; Joker	3:40
2.	"Never Gonna Say I'm Sorry"	Joker	Joker	Pop; Martin; Joker	3:16
3.	"Lucky Love"	Joker; Billy Steinberg	Joker	Pop; Martin; Joker	2:51
4.	"Edge of Heaven"	Ulf "Buddha" Ekberg; Ballard; StoneStream	Buddha; Ballard; StoneStream	Buddha; Ballard; StoneStream	3:49
5.	"Strange Ways"	Linn Berggren	L. Berggren	Radiant; Linn	4:16
6.	"Ravine"	Jenny Berggren	J. Berggren	Ekman; Adebratt	4:40
7.	"Perfect World"	Buddha; Ballard; StoneStream	Buddha; Ballard; StoneStream	Buddha; Ballard; StoneStream	3:57
8.	"Angel Eyes"	Joker; Steinberg	Joker	Adebratt; Ekman; Joker	3:13
9.	"Whispers in Blindness"	L. Berggren	L. Berggren	Zal; Linn	4:11
10.	"My Déjà Vu"	Joker	Joker	Adebratt; Carr; Ekman; Joker	3:22
11.	"You and I"	Joker; Steinberg	Joker	Joker	4:05
12.	"Wave Wet Sand"	J. Berggren	J. Berggren	Joker	3:18
13.	"Que Sera"	Buddha; Ballard; StoneStream	Buddha; Ballard; StoneStream	Buddha; Ballard; StoneStream	3:47
14.	"Just 'N' Image"	L. Berggren	L. Berggren	Ekman; Adebratt; Linn	3:07
15.	"Experience Pearls"	J. Berggren	J. Berggren	Carr; Bag	3:57
16.	"Blooming 18"	Joker; Steinberg	Joker	Pop; Martin; Joker	3:38
17.	"Lucky Love" (Acoustic Version)	Joker; Steinberg	Joker	Pop; Martin; Joker	2:53
18.	"Beautiful Life" (12" Extended Version)	Jonas "Joker" Berggren; Ballard	Joker	Pop; Martin; Joker	5:47
19.	"Never Gonna Say I'm Sorry" (Long Version)	Joker	Joker	Pop; Martin; Joker	6:33
20.	"Lucky Love" (Extended Original Version)	Joker; Steinberg	Joker	Pop; Martin; Joker	4:50

The Bridge — CD 4
No.	Title	Lyrics	Length
1.	"Beautiful Life" (Junior's Retro 12" Mix)	Jonas "Joker" Berggren; Ballard	7:53
2.	"Lucky Love" (Frankie Knuckles Classic Club Mix)	Joker; Steinberg	7:22
3.	"Never Gonna Say I'm Sorry" (Turbine Mix)	Joker	5:27
4.	"Beautiful Life" (The Euro-Vogue Mix)	Jonas "Joker" Berggren; Ballard	5:21
5.	"Lucky Love" (Lenny B's Full-A-Love Mix)	Joker; Steinberg	6:12
6.	"Never Gonna Say I'm Sorry" (Lenny B's Total Reconstruction)	Joker	7:07
7.	"Beautiful Life" (Vission Lorimer Anthem Mix)	Jonas "Joker" Berggren; Ballard	7:45
8.	"Lucky Love" (Todd Terry Mix)	Joker; Steinberg	6:01
9.	"Beautiful Life" (Junior's Hard as H Mix)	Jonas "Joker" Berggren; Ballard	8:14
10.	"Lucky Love" (Franktified Dub Mix)	Joker; Steinberg	9:08
11.	"Beautiful Life" (Uno Clio Mix)	Jonas "Joker" Berggren; Ballard	7:57

Flowers — CD 5
No.	Title	Lyrics	Music	Producer(s)	Length
1.	"Life Is a Flower"	Jonas "Joker" Berggren	Joker	Ekman; Adebratt; Joker	3:47
2.	"Always Have, Always Will"	Mike Chapman	Joker	Ole Evenrude	3:46
3.	"Cruel Summer"	Sara Dallin; Keren Woodward; Steve Jolley; Tony Swain	Dallin; Woodward; Jolley; Swain	Cutfather & Joe	3:35
4.	"Travel to Romantis"	Joker	Joker	Joker; Johnny Jam & Delgado	4:10
5.	"Adventures in Paradise"	Joker; Joe Belmaati; Mich Hansen	Joker; Belmaati; Hansen	Cutfather & Joe	3:32
6.	"Dr. Sun"	Joker	Joker	Carr; John Amatiello; Joker	3:35
7.	"Cecilia"	Joker	Joker	Ekman; Adebratt; Joker	3:55
8.	"He Decides"	Jenny Berggren	J. Berggren	Carr; Peo Hägström	3:09
9.	"I Pray"	Ulf "Buddha" Ekberg; Ballard	Buddha; Ballard	Charles Fisher; Buddha; StoneStream	3:16
10.	"Tokyo Girl"	Steinberg; Ralph McCarthy; Joker	Joker	Johnny Jam & Delgado; Carr; Amatiello; Joker	3:36
11.	"Don't Go Away"	Buddha; Ballard	Buddha; Ballard	Fisher; Buddha; StoneStream	3:41
12.	"Captain Nemo"	Joker	Joker	Carr; Amatiello; Joker	4:02
13.	"Donnie"	Joker	Joker	Carr; Amatiello; Joker	4:37
14.	"Everytime It Rains"	Steinberg; Rick Nowels; Maria Vidal	Steinberg; Nowels; Vidal	Cutfather & Joe	4:50
15.	"C'est La Vie (Always 21)"	Jonas Berggren	Joker	J. Ekgren; S. Pettersen; S. Rösnes	3:26
16.	"Hallo Hallo"	Jonas Berggren		The Trinity Boys	2:51
17.	"Love in December"	Jonas Berggren; Ekberg; Jenny Berggren; Linn Berggren		Soulpoets	3:59
18.	"Whenever You're Near Me"	Mike Chapman	Joker	Evenrude	3:30
19.	"Cruel Summer" (Big Bonus Mix)	Dallin; Woodward; Jolley; Swain	Dallin; Woodward; Jolley; Swain	Stephen Hague; Joker; Buddha; Johnny Jam & Delgado	4:06
20.	"Cecilia" (Ole Evenrude Radio Mix)	Joker		Ole Evenrude	3:30
21.	"Everytime It Rains" (Metro Radio Mix)	Steinberg; Nowels; Vidal		Brian Rawling; Mark Taylor	4:15

Flowers — CD 6
No.	Title	Lyrics	Producer(s)	Length
1.	"Donnie" (Ole Evenrude Version)	Joker	Ole Evenrude	3:45
2.	"He Decides" (Charles Fisher Mix)	Jenny Berggren	Fisher; Joker	3:48
3.	"Travel to Romantis" (Love To Infinity Mix)	Joker	Love to Infinity	3:35
4.	"Hallo Hallo" (Radio Version)	Jonas Berggren	von der Burg	2:51
5.	"Love in December" (Alternative Disco Version)	Jonas Berggren; Ekberg; Jenny Berggren; Linn Berggren		3:35
6.	"Cruel Summer" (With Alliage Extended Mix)		Steve Mac	5:47
7.	"C'est La Vie (Always 21)" (Skeewiff's Full Biffter)	Jonas Berggren	Skeewiff	4:16
8.	"Life Is a Flower" (Extended Version)	Jonas Berggren		5:44
9.	"Travel to Romantis" (Josef Larossi Mix)	Jonas Berggren	Josef Larossi	5:34
10.	"Everytime It Rains" (Metro Club Mix)	Steinberg; Nowels; Vidal	Rawling; Taylor	7:08
11.	"Hallo Hallo" (Hitvision Radio Edit)	Jonas Berggren	Huma; Sir Martin	3:05
12.	"Whenever You're Near Me" (Nikolas & Sibley Dance Mix)	Chapman; Jonas Berggren		8:53
13.	"C'est La Vie (Always 21)" (Shaft Club Mix)	Jonas Berggren	Shaft (Al & El)	5:02
14.	"Cruel Summer" (Hartmann & Langhoff Club Mix)	Dallin; Woodward; Jolley; Swain	Hartmann & Langhoff	7:45
15.	"Everytime It Rains" (Karmadelic Club Mix)	Steinberg; Nowels; Vidal	Anton Bass; Konrad Carelli	8:55

Flowers — CD 7
No.	Title	Lyrics	Producer(s)	Length
1.	"Hallo Hallo" (Alternative Version)	Jonas Berggren		3:29
2.	"Travel to Romantis" (Wolf Mix)	Jonas Berggren	Håkan Kristoffersson, Joker	4:02
3.	"Life Is A Flower" (Sweetbox Remix [Aka Sweetbox Mix 1])	Jonas Berggren	Geo	6:16
4.	"Cruel Summer" (Garage Mix Extended)	Dallin; Woodward; Jolley; Swain	Benoît Suys; Philippe Renaux; Steve Mac	5:27
5.	"Cecelia" (In Da Nite)	Jonas Berggren	Ole Evenrude; The "Three Of Us"	4:08
6.	"C'est La Vie (Always 21)" (Sleazesisters Anthem Mix)	Jonas Berggren	Sleazesisters	7:33
7.	"Everytime It Rains" (That Kid Chris 2000 Club Mix)	Steinberg; Nowels; Vidal	Chris Staropoli	10:32
8.	"Whenever You're Near Me" (Giuseppe D's Extended Remix)	Chapman; Jonas Berggren	Giuseppe D	4:40
9.	"Hallo Hallo" (XTM Full Remix)	Jonas Berggren	Ivan Ten; Xasqui Ten	6:12
10.	"Travel to Romantis" (Love to Infinity Indian Tonic Mix)	Jonas Berggren	Love to Infinity	7:42
11.	"Cruel Summer" (Hani Num Club Mix)	Dallin; Woodward; Jolley; Swain	Hani	8:13
12.	"Life Is a Flower" (Milk Uht Radio Mix)	Dallin; Woodward; Jolley; Swain	Ivo Donckers	3:42
13.	"C'est La Vie (Always 21)" (Tuff Twins Mix)	Jonas Berggren	DJ Elvira; DJ Modelle	7:22

Da Capo — CD 8
No.	Title	Writer(s)	Producer(s)	Length
1.	"Unspeakable"	Jonas "Joker" Berggren; Adam Anders; Nicklas von der Burg; Magnus Lindsten	von der Burg; Harry Sommerdahl; Joker	3:14
2.	"Beautiful Morning"	Joker; Jenny Berggren; Linn Berggren	Pontus Söderqvist; Axel Breitung; Kay Nickold	2:59
3.	"Remember the Words"	Joker; von der Burg; Sommerdahl; Anoo Bhagavan	von der Burg; Sommerdahl; Joker	3:43
4.	"Da Capo"	Joker	Thorsten Brötzmann; Jeo; von der Burg; Sommerdahl; Håkan Christoffersson; Joker	3:10
5.	"World Down Under"	Joker; von der Burg; Sommerdahl	von der Burg; Sommerdahl	3:32
6.	"Ordinary Day"	Joker	Söderqvist; Christoffersson; Joker	3:24
7.	"Wonderful Life"	Black	Thorsten Brötzmann; Jeo	4:15
8.	"Show Me Love"	Joker	Chief 1; Sommerdahl; von der Burg	3:42
9.	"What's the Name of the Game"	Joker; J. Berggren; L. Berggren; von der Burg; Sommerdahl	von der Burg; Sommerdahl; Joker	3:02
10.	"Change with the Light"	Joker; Ekberg; J. Berggren; L. Berggren	Söderqvist; Nick Nice; Buddha	3:35
11.	"Hey Darling"	Joker	Söderqvist; Nick Nice; Christoffersson; Joker	3:16
12.	"The Juvenile"	Joker	Söderqvist; Martin Hedström	3:45
13.	"Beautiful Morning" (Alternative Version)	Joker; Jenny Berggren; Linn Berggren		3:34
14.	"Da Capo" (Alternative Version)	Joker	Kristoffersson; Joker; Sommerdahl; von der Burg	3:26
15.	"Change with the Light" (Alternative Version)	Joker; Ekberg; J. Berggren; L. Berggren		3:52
16.	"Hey Darling" (Alternative Version)	Joker	David Brunner	3:20
17.	"Beautiful Morning" (Groove Radio Edit)	Joker; Jenny Berggren; Linn Berggren	Axel Breitung	2:47
18.	"Unspeakable" (Junk & Function M12 Club Mix)	Jonas "Joker" Berggren; Adam Anders; Nicklas von der Burg; Magnus Lindsten	Junk & Function; M12	5:24
19.	"Hey Darling" (Bells Version)	Joker	Ole Evenrude	3:05
20.	"Beautiful Morning" (Spanish Fly Club Version)	Joker; Jenny Berggren; Linn Berggren	Spanish Fly	5:16
21.	"Unspeakable" (Fairlite Dub Mix)	Jonas "Joker" Berggren; Adam Anders; Nicklas von der Burg; Magnus Lindsten		6:47

Hidden Gems Volume One — CD 9
No.	Title	Writer(s)	Producer(s)	Length
1.	"Would You Believe" (era: Da Capo)	Jonas Berggren	Tommy Ekman; Jonas Berggren	2:50
2.	"Go Go Go" (era: Da Capo)	Jonas Berggren	Pontus Söderqvist; Jonas Berggren	3:29
3.	"Into the Night of Blue" (B-side of "Cruel Summer")	Jonas Berggren; Douglas Carr; Diane Warren	Jonas Berggren; Stephen Hague	4:13
4.	"Don't Stop" (B-side of "The Juvenile")	Jonas Berggren; Arild Haugland; Birthe Berggren	Harry Sommerdahl, Jonas Berggren, Jonas von der Burg	2:49
5.	"Make My Day" (era: Da Capo)	Jonas Berggren	Ekman; Jonas Berggren	2:55
6.	"Mercy Mercy" (B-side of "Always Have, Always Will")	Ulf Ekberg; John Ballard	Charles Fisher; Ekberg	3:37
7.	"No Good Lover" (B-side of "Life Is a Flower")	Jonas Berggren	John Amatiello; Jonas Berggren	3:35
8.	"Summer Days" (Da Capo Japanese bonus track)	Jonas von der Burg; Harry Sommerdahl; Joker	von der Burg; Sommerdahl; Joker	3:46
9.	"Giving It Up (2014 remake)" (era: Happy Nation)	Jonas Berggren; Ekberg	Jonas Berggren; Ekberg	2:46
10.	"Come to Me (Ace version)" (era: Da Capo)	Jonas Berggren; Haugland; Birthe Berggren	Håkan Christoffersson; Jonas Berggren	3:54
11.	"Prime Time" (era: Da Capo)	Jonas Berggren	Ekman; Jonas Berggren	3:14
12.	"Look Around Me" (era: The Bridge)	Ekberg; Ballard	Ballard; Ekberg; Björn Stenström	3:16
13.	"Pole Position" (era: Happy Nation)	Jonas Berggren; Ekberg; Malin Berggren; Jenny Berggren	Jonas Berggren; Ekberg	3:23
14.	"Sunset in Southern California" (era: Da Capo; remade as "Southern California" on The Golden Ratio)	Jonas Berggren	Ekman; Jonas Berggren	3:12
15.	"Moment of Magic" (era: Da Capo)	Jonas Berggren; Ekberg; Malin Berggren; Jenny Berggren	Jonas Berggren; Ekberg	2:29
16.	"Mr. Ace" (era: Happy Nation)	Joker; Buddha; Linn; Jenny	Joker; Buddha	3:21
17.	"Moogoperator" (era: Happy Nation)	Joker; Buddha	Joker; Buddha	3:32
18.	"Kings and Queens" (Cruel Summer 2015 bonus track)	Ekberg; Ballard	Ballard; Ekberg; Björn Stenström	3:23
19.	"Love for Sale" (B-side of "Always Have, Always Will")	Joker	Joker	3:35
20.	"L'amour" (from the compilation Let Love Be Love: X-mas 1998; era: Flowers)	Joker; Billy Steinberg	Joker; Candy Hill	4:01
21.	"Would You Believe" (Alternative Version)	Jonas Berggren		3:05
22.	"Cuba, Cuba Libre"	Joker	Ole Evenrrude	3:34
23.	"Giving It Up" (Ace Version)	Jonas Berggren; Ekberg		3:27

Hidden Gems Volume Two — CD 10
No.	Title	Writer(s)	Producer(s)	Length
1.	"Girl in the Line" (era: Da Capo)	Jonas "Joker" Berggren	Joker; Pontus Söderqvist	3:16
2.	"Love in the Ghetto" (era: Da Capo)	Joker	Tommy Ekman; Joker	2:53
3.	"Stranger to Love" (era: The Bridge/Flowers)	Ulf Ekberg; John Ballard	Ballard, Ekberg, Stenström	3:12
4.	"Memories Forever" (era: Flowers)	Joker; Ekberg; Jenny Berggren; Malin Berggren	Joker; Buddha	3:46
5.	"At the Borderline (Moogoperator 2)" (era: Da Capo)	Joker; Buddha	Joker; Buddha	3:50
6.	"Kyrie Eleison" (era: Flowers)	Joker	Joker; Buddha	2:13
7.	"Immanuel" (era: Flowers)	Jenny Berggren	Martin Hedström	2:47
8.	"Angel of Love" (era: The Bridge)	Ekberg; Ballard; Stenström	Ballard; Ekberg; Stenström	3:12
9.	"Stay with Me" (era: Flowers)	Jenny Berggren	Denniz PoP, Max Martin	3:23
10.	"For a Thousand Days" (era: The Bridge)	Joker; Buddha	Joker; Buddha	3:34
11.	"All Temptations" (era: Da Capo)	Joker	Joker; Håkan Kristoffersson	3:30
12.	"She was Thinking of You" (era: Flowers)	Billy Steinberg; Rick Nowels; China Forbes	Joker; Håkan Kristoffersson	3:16
13.	"The Challenge" (era: Flowers)	Joker	Joker; Douglas Carr; John Amatiello	2:48
14.	"Bad Dad" (era: Happy Nation)	Joker; Buddha	Joker; Buddha	3:57
15.	"The Wizard" (era: Happy Nation)	Joker	Joker; Tech Noir	3:13
16.	"Close To You" (era: Happy Nation)	Joker; Buddha	Joker; Buddha	3:54
17.	"Funk Funk" (era: Happy Nation)	Joker; Buddha	Joker; Buddha	3:32
18.	"Reality (In Black And White)" (era: Tech Noir)	Joker; Tech Noir		3:11
19.	"Wish You Were Mine" (era: Redefined)	Joker; Jenny Berggren; Ekberg; Jakob Petrén	Joker; Simon Petrén	3:08
20.	"Couldn't Care Less" (era: Redefined)	Joker Berggren; Jenny Berggren; Ekberg; Jakob Petrén	Joker; Jakob Petrén; Simon Petrén	3:52
21.	"Stranger to Love" (Original Version)	Ekberg; Ballard		3:27
22.	"Giving It Up" (1999 Version)	Berggren; Ekberg		3:05
23.	"Moment of Magic" (Alternative Version)	Jonas Berggren; Ekberg; Malin Berggren; Jenny Berggren		3:40

Edge of Heaven — CD 11
No.	Title	Writer(s)	Producer(s)	Length
1.	"Edge of Heaven" (Monte X 2 Ballad Re-mix)	Ekberg; Ballard; StoneStream	Monte X 2	3:25
2.	"Edge of Heaven" (Radiant Silverbullet Mix)	Ekberg; Ballard; StoneStream	Radiant	6:27
3.	"Edge of Heaven" (Stonestream – On The Edge)	Ekberg; Ballard; StoneStream	Stonestream	6:53
4.	"All That She Wants" (Moombahteam Remix)	Joker; Buddha	Moombahteam	3:13
5.	"Always Have, Always Will" (Matt Pop 2020 Remix)	Chapman	Evenrude; Matt Pop	5:58
6.	"Beautiful Life" (Mike Ross Definitive Club Mix)	Jonas "Joker" Berggren; Ballard	PoP; Joker; Martin; Mike Ross	7:05
7.	"Never Gonna Say I'm Sorry" (Singlewave Remix)	Joker	PoP; Joker; Martin; Singlewave (Rodrigo Navarrete)	4:52
8.	"Cruel Summer" (Niv Cohen Remix)	Dallin; Woodward; Jolley; Swain	Cutfather & Joe; Niv Cohen	3:19
9.	"All That She Wants" (The Distance & Riddick Remix)	Joker; Buddha	PoP; Joker; Buddha; The Distance & Riddick	6:04
10.	"The Sign" (Freedom Bunch Mix)	Joker	Karl Johan Råsmark	3:22
11.	"Lucky Love 2009"	Joker; Steinberg	Råsmark	2:57
12.	"Don't Turn Around 2009"	Hammond; Warren		3:06
13.	"Wheel Of Fortune 2009" (Club Mix)	Joker; Buddha	Råsmark	5:25
14.	"Peepshow" (Live in Gothenburg, 1990)	Joker; Tech Noir	Joker; Tech Noir	3:59
15.	"Sunshine" (Live in Gothenburg, 1990)	Joker; Tech Noir	Joker; Tech Noir	4:19
16.	"Vamos A La Playa/Don't You Want Me" (Live in Gothenburg, 1990)			3:16
17.	"Scotch/P. Lion Medley" (Live in Gothenburg, 1990)			4:58

DVD
No.	Title	Director(s)	Length
1.	"Wheel of Fortune"	Viking Nielson	3:51
2.	"All That She Wants"	Matt Broadley	3:30
3.	"Happy Nation"	Matt Broadley	3:30
4.	"The Sign"	Mathias Julin	3:18
5.	"Don't Turn Around"	Matt Broadley	3:52
6.	"Living in Danger"	Matt Broadley	3:19
7.	"Lucky Love"	Rocky Schenck	2:52
8.	"Beautiful Life"	Richard Heslop	3:41
9.	"Never Gonna Say I'm Sorry"	Richard Heslop	3:15
10.	"Life Is a Flower"	Andy Neumann	3:32
11.	"Cruel Summer"	Nigel Dick	3:35
12.	"Travel to Romantis"	Andy Neumann	3:56
13.	"Always Have, Always Will"	Ace of Base	3:43
14.	"C'est la Vie (Always 21)"	Patric Ullaeus	3:27
15.	"Beautiful Morning"	Daniel Borjesson	3:02
16.	"Unspeakable"	Daniel Borjesson	3:23
17.	"Lucky Love (U.S. Version)"	Rocky Schenck	2:53
18.	"Cruel Summer"		3:31
19.	"Happy Nation (Moody Gold Mix)"	Matt Broadley	3:55
20.	"Don't Turn Around (The Aswad Mix)"	Matt Broadley	3:56
21.	"Living in Danger (D-house Mix)"	Matt Broadley	5:02
22.	"Lucky Love (Acoustic Version)"	Matt Broadley	2:57
23.	"Beautiful Life (Alternative Version)"	Richard Heslop	3:40
24.	"Cruel Summer (Big Bonus Mix)"	Nigel Dick	4:06
25.	"Would You Believe"	Trace Adam	2:49
26.	"Hear Me Calling (Photo Gallery)"		3:47

== Release history ==
Region	Date	Format
UK	3 July 2020	Standard edition
