= Cruel Summer (Ace of Base album) =

Studio album (reissue) by Ace of Base
- Released: 14 July 1998
- Recorded: September 1997–early 1998
- Genres: Dance-pop; Motown; Eurodisco
- Length: 45:40
- Label: Arista
- Producers: Per Adebratt; John Amatiello; Jonas "Joker" Berggren; Douglas Carr; Cutfather & Joe; Clive Davis (executive producer); Ulf "Buddha" Ekberg; Ole Evenrud; Tommy Ekman; Charles Fisher; Hani; Johnny Jam & Delgado; Love to Infinity; StoneStream

Ace of Base chronology
Flowers (1998)	Cruel Summer (1998)	Singles of the 90s (1999)

Singles from Cruel Summer
- 1. "Cruel Summer" Released: 30 June 1998; 2. "Whenever You're Near Me" Released: 6 October 1998

Cruel Summer is a 1998 studio album by the Swedish pop group Ace of Base, released as the band's third album in North America on 14 July 1998 and in Japan on 25 August 1998, by Arista Records. Flowers was the group's third album worldwide, but Arista decided to release a different version in North America, Japan, and Latin America, retitled Cruel Summer. This version of the album featured the new track "Everytime It Rains" and several new versions of songs that were first featured on Flowers. As executive producer, Clive Davis enlisted collaborators including production team Cutfather & Joe and songwriter Billy Steinberg. While primarily a pop album, Cruel Summer explores Eurodisco, Motown, and dance.

Cruel Summer received generally favorable reviews from music critics, who complimented its production and viewed it as a superior version of Flowers. Despite this, the album was not a success and failed to crack the top 100 of the Billboard 200, peaking at number 101. The album and its singles saw more success upon their release in Canada. The project was promoted with a series of live television performances that featured minimal participation from band member Linn Berggren. Two singles were released, one of which became an international success. The titular lead single, "Cruel Summer", peaked at number 10 on the US Billboard Hot 100 and was certified gold. The second and final single, "Whenever You're Near Me", received little promotion and peaked at number 76.

== Background and development ==
Ace of Base did not immediately return to the studio as they had with their second album. Band member Linn Berggren grew tired of the spotlight and had returned home early from the group's tour of Asia. The quartet took a break from both recording and promotion; Ulf Ekberg moved to Marbella, Spain.

In mid-1997, the band's record companies asked Ace of Base for new material. Representatives at Arista Records specifically wanted "summery", sunny songs. Toward the end of the year, "Doctor Sun" had been recorded. It was the first track completed for the new album, and the band members test-played the song in several clubs in Gothenburg. Originally, the song featured vocals from all four members, but Ekberg's vocals were eventually cut on the final version, which was not released in the United States.

== Composition ==
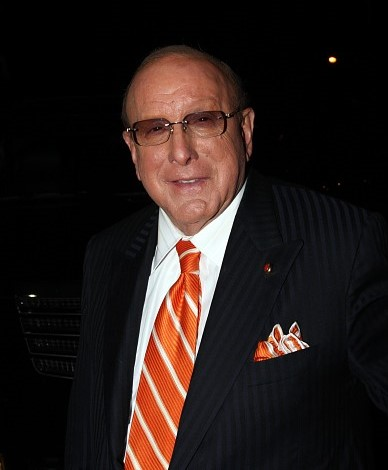
Clive Davis was instrumental in the composition of Cruel Summer.

Ace of Base had resisted recording another cover song, but at the insistence of their British record label, London Recordings, as well as Arista, Jonas Berggren chose Bananarama's "Cruel Summer" in what he called "an easy decision". While their first version, produced by Johnny Jam & Delgado, was released as a single in Europe, it was considered unsuitable for an American release. A new rerecorded version, overseen by Arista president Clive Davis and produced by Cutfather and Joe, was commissioned instead. Davis also oversaw the production of the track "Adventures in Paradise". Jenny Berggren had written "He Decides" for the new album, but the song was also considered unsuitable in its original form and was remixed by Charles Fisher. Ulf composed "more than twenty songs", but only one was used on the final record. Linn wrote and produced a demo titled "Lapponia", which was originally submitted for The Bridge, but the track was rejected.

Arista generally chose songs written by Jonas for the record, although not all of them were considered album-worthy in their original versions. Jenny was asked to record new vocals for a reproduced version of "Donnie", and Linn's vocals were cut altogether. The resulting remix was later described as a "Phil Spector-inspired Wall of Sound". "Life Is a Flower" was considered unsuitable for American audiences, despite high chart positions worldwide. Davis ordered a new version, which became "Whenever You're Near Me", a love song produced by Ole Evenrud. Davis was also instrumental in the recording (and re-recording) of "Everytime It Rains". The original vocals by Jenny were found unsuitable, and a version featuring Linn's voice was used instead. Linn was very reluctant to record the song and did only one take for the final composition. "Travel to Romantis" was remixed by Love to Infinity, and "Always Have, Always Will" was edited for the U.S. release.

The album's European title, Flowers, was changed, and Arista originally settled on Everytime it Rains. The label retitled the record Cruel Summer following the successful performance of the eponymous single.

== Artwork ==
The design for the album is the same as that used on Flowers, but the album booklets have different designs. The artwork was shot by photographer Jonas Linell. While each band member received one page in the booklet for a solo picture, Linn's image is the only one that is blurred. This image is the same as the one found on the cover of the record, but zoomed-in and flipped. Linn was not present for the entirety of the photoshoot and had to be edited into some of the photos.

== Singles and promotion ==
"Cruel Summer" was released as the first single from the album and became a top-ten hit, peaking at number ten on both the Billboard Hot 100 and Hot Dance Club Songs charts. The song was promoted in the United States with performances on CBS This Morning and The View, which Linn was present for. "Cruel Summer" received positive reviews from critics, such as Billboard magazine, who called the song a "potential smash", and Amazon.com, who described the track as a "light, upbeat groove". Entertainment Weekly was more critical of the song, calling it "pointless", in an otherwise positive album review.

A second single, "Whenever You're Near Me", received little attention and was not even correctly promoted on the Arista website, where it was listed as "Whenever You Need Me", despite fan efforts to get the mistake corrected. A music video for the song was not produced, though the track was promoted with a live performance on Ricki Lake, which Linn did not attend. "Whenever You're Near Me" received a positive review from Larry Flick of Billboard, who noted that the song was "rife with sunny Caribbean percussion and a sweet smattering of acoustic guitar/synth interplay". He also predicted that the single "should saturate airwaves within seconds". Despite this, the song peaked at number 76 on the Billboard Hot 100 and spent only five weeks on the chart. The track was somewhat more successful in Canada, where it peaked at number 51.

Further singles were released from Flowers across Europe, but none from Cruel Summer in the United States; "Donnie" was issued as a promotional single in Japan. "Everytime It Rains" was later remixed and released as a promotional single from the band's 2000 compilation album, Greatest Hits.

== Critical reception ==
Professional ratings
Review scores
Source	Rating
AllMusic	2.5/5 stars
E!	B
Entertainment Weekly	A−
Los Angeles Times	3/4 stars
The Rolling Stone Album Guide	2.5/5 stars
The Encyclopedia of Popular Music	2/5 stars

Cruel Summer received generally positive reviews from music critics. Tom Lanham of Entertainment Weekly provided a favorable take, noting that "there isn't a note out of concordant place, no potential hook overlooked". He compared the album favorably to works by ABBA, describing it as "perfect pop-Euro-disco balance". Rebecca Wallwork of Amazon.com shared a similar sentiment and described Cruel Summer as a "collection of syncopation and radio-friendly melodies". Paul Verna of Billboard described the album as "a record of surprising freshness". Gary Shipes from The Stuart News also favorably compared the music to ABBA and described "Everytime It Rains" as a "gorgeous ballad" that "oozes maturity and confidence". In a review of Flowers, Jose F. Promis of AllMusic stated that "Donnie" was in a superior form on Cruel Summer, noting that the track was "somewhat under-produced and unrealized on Flowers but truly shines on Cruel Summer". He also noted that the overall production on Cruel Summer was "meatier than on Flowers". Fred Bronson of Billboard ranked the album number one in the 1998 "the year in music" critics' poll. He preferred Cruel Summer to Flowers, stating, "credit Clive Davis for transforming the original release into one of the greatest pop albums of all time". In a positive review, Time Out New York wrote "The band's place in the pop pantheon is secure".

In contrast, Stephen Thomas Erlewine of AllMusic was more critical in his review, comparing the album to The Sign and The Bridge. Despite calling the title track a "melodic high point", he stated that the album failed "to rival their previous pop pinnacles" and that it sounded "a little too similar its predecessors". "Donnie", "Always Have, Always Will", and the Love to Infinity mix of "Travel to Romantis" were listed as track picks from the record.

== Commercial performance ==
Despite spawning a top-ten single, Cruel Summer was not successful. It peaked at number 101 on the Billboard 200 albums chart, dropping off the charts ten weeks after its release. People magazine reported in December 1998 that only 122,000 copies had sold, while Flowers had received a platinum certification in Switzerland, gold in Denmark and Sweden, and silver in the United Kingdom. Cruel Summer was more successful in Canada, where it peaked at number 23 and was certified gold.

== Track listing ==
US/Canadian edition
No.	Title	Lyrics	Music	Producer(s)	Length
1.	"Cruel Summer"	Sara Dallin; Siobhan Fahey; Keren Woodward; Anthony Swain; Steve Jolley	Dallin; Fahey; Woodward; Swain; Jolley	Cutfather & Joe	3:35
2.	"Donnie" (Ole Evenrude version)	Jonas "Joker" Berggren	Joker	Ole Evenrud	3:47
3.	"Whenever You're Near Me"	Mike Chapman	Joker	Evenrude	3:32
4.	"Everytime It Rains"	Billy Steinberg; Rick Nowels; Maria Vidal	Steinberg; Nowels; Vidal	Cutfather & Joe	4:52
5.	"Adventures in Paradise"	Joker; Joe Belmaati; Mich Hedin Hansen	Joker; Belmaati; Jansen	Cutfather & Joe	3:32
6.	"Don't Go Away"	Ulf "Buddha" Ekberg; John Ballard	Buddha; Ballard	Charles Fisher; Buddha; StoneStream^{[a]}	3:41
7.	"Cecilia"	Joker	Joker	Tommy Ekman; Per Adebratt; Joker	3:55
8.	"He Decides" (Charles Fisher mix)	Jenny Berggren	Jenny Berggren	Charles Fisher; Joker	3:49
9.	"Always Have, Always Will" (edit)	Chapman	Joker	Evenrude	3:46
10.	"Tokyo Girl"	Steinberg; Ralph McCarthy	Joker	Johnny Jam & Delgado; Douglas Carr^{[b]}; John Amatiello^{[b]}; Joker^{[b]}	3:36
11.	"Travel to Romantis" (Love to Infinity mix)	Joker	Joker	Joker; Johnny Jam & Delgado; Love to Infinity^{[a]}	3:27
12.	"Cruel Summer" (Blazin' Rhythm remix)	Dallin; Fahey; Woodward; Swain; Jolley	Dallin; Fahey; Woodward; Swain; Jolley	Cutfather & Joe; Hani^{[a]}	3:31

Japanese edition
No.	Title	Lyrics	Music	Producer(s)	Length
3.	"Life Is a flower"				3:44
13.	"Dr. Sun"	Joker	Joker; Carr; Amatiello	Joker; Carr; Amatiello	3:35
14.	"Into the Night of Blue"	Diane Warren	Joker; Carr	Joker; Steven Hague	4:11

2015 remastered version
No.	Title	Length
13.	"Kings and Queens"	3:15

Notes

- ^{^[a]} signifies an additional producer
- ^{^[b]} signifies pre-production

== Personnel ==
- Credits adapted from AllMusic

- Borje "Buller Bang" – percussion
- Delgado – keyboards, programming, producer
- Sasha – bass
- Per Adebratt – keyboards, programming
- John Amatiello – keyboards, programming, engineer
- Andy – remixing
- John Ballard – backing vocals, vocal arrangement
- Ulf Bandgren – guitar
- Bas-Berra – bass
- Joe Belmaati – arranger, keyboards, programming, producer, engineer, mixing
- Jenny Berggren – vocals, backing vocals
- Jonas "Joker" Berggren – keyboards, programming, engineer, vocoder
- Linn Berggren – vocals, backing vocals
- Marit Bie – backing vocals
- Marianne Bundevik – backing vocals
- Mark Burdett – design
- Douglas Carr – keyboards, programming, engineer
- Suzanne Carstensen – backing vocals
- Desi "Dezrock" Caruso – keyboards
- Cutfather – arranger, producer, mixing
- Clive Davis – executive producer
- Ulf "Buddha" Ekberg – producer
- Tommy Ekman – arranger, keyboards, programming, engineer, mixing
- Ole Evenrude – arranger, producer
- Charlie Falk – string arrangements
- Charles Fisher – producer
- Birthe H. – backing vocals
- Peo Haggstrom – keyboards, programming
- Hani – producer, remixing
- Nana Hedin – backing vocals
- Henrik – conductor, horn arrangements, string arrangements
- Johnny Jam – keyboards, programming, producer
- Ulf Janson – conductor, horn arrangements, string arrangements
- Bjarne "Spiff" Johansson – percussion, drums
- Mads Johansson – guitar
- Jonas Karg – guitar
- Dave Lee – programming
- Peter Lee – remixing
- David Leonard – mixing
- Jonas Linell – photography
- Marian Lisland – backing vocals
- Bernard Löhr – mixing
- Matz Nilsson – mixing
- Tue Roh – Rhodes piano, string arrangements
- Thomas Siqveland – programming
- Eivind Skovdahl – percussion, engineer
- Joakim Stiren – programming, mixing
- Stonestream – drum programming
- Leon Zervos – mastering

== Charts ==
Weekly chart performance for Cruel Summer
Chart (1998)	Peak position
Canada Top Albums/CDs (RPM)	23
Japanese Albums (Oricon)	14
US Billboard 200	101

== Certifications ==
Region	Certification	Certified units/sales
Canada (Music Canada)	Gold	50,000^{^}
Japan (RIAJ)	2× Platinum	400,000^{^}
^{^} Shipments figures based on certification alone.

== Release history ==
Cruel Summer release history
Region	Date	Format	Label	Ref(s)
United States	14 July 1998	CD; cassette	Arista	
Japan	25 August 1998	CD; cassette	Arista	
