= All That She Wants (disambiguation) =

"All That She Wants" is a 1992 single by Ace of Base.

All That She Wants may also refer to:

- All That She Wants (2008 film), a 2008 Canadian drama by Denis Côté
- All That She Wants (2026 film), an upcoming romantic comedy written by David West Read
- All That She Wants (TV series), a documentary mini-series about Ace of Base
- All That She Wants: The Classic Collection, a 2020 box set by Ace of Base
- All That She Wants (album), or The Collection, a 2002 album by Ace of Base
