= The Collection (Ace of Base album) =

The Collection/All That She Wants

Greatest hits album by Ace of Base
- Released: 21 October 2002
- Recorded: 1992–1998
- Genre: Pop
- Label: Universal Music
- Producer: Various

Ace of Base chronology
Da Capo (2002)	The Collection/All That She Wants (2002)	Platinum & Gold Collection (2003)

Professional ratings
Review scores
Source	Rating
The Encyclopedia of Popular Music	3/5 stars

The Collection (UK, Germany, Spain) and All That She Wants (Denmark) are Ace of Base compilation albums.

== Track listing ==
1. "All That She Wants"
2. "Voulez-Vous Danser"
3. "Young and Proud"
4. "Waiting for Magic"
5. "Happy Nation"
6. "Dancer in a Daydream"
7. "Edge of Heaven"
8. "Angel Eyes"
9. "Beautiful Life"
10. "My Déjà Vu" (German album version)
11. "Lucky Love"
12. "Never Gonna Say I'm Sorry"
13. "Travel to Romantis"
14. "Cecilia"
15. "Cruel Summer" (Big bonus mix)
16. "Tokyo Girl (Ace of Base song)"
17. "Donnie"
18. "Everytime It Rains"
