= Da Capo (Ace of Base album) =

2002 studio album by Ace of Base

Studio album by Ace of Base
- Released: 30 September 2002
- Recorded: 2000
- Genres: Pop; reggae fusion
- Length: 41:55
- Labels: Edel-Mega; Polydor; Universal
- Producers: Chief 1; Jonas "Joker" Berggren; Axel Breitung; Nicklas von der Burg; Thorsten Brötzmann; Håkan Christoffersson; Ulf "Buddha" Ekberg; Martin Hedström; Kay Nickold; Nick Nice; Harry Sommerdahl; Pontus Söderqvist; Jeo

Ace of Base chronology
Greatest Hits (2000)	Da Capo (2002)	The Collection/All That She Wants (2002)

Alternative cover
- Japanese cover

Singles from Da Capo
- 1. "Beautiful Morning" Released: 9 September 2002; 2. "Unspeakable" Released: 2 December 2002; 3. "The Juvenile" Released: 9 December 2002

Professional ratings
Review scores
Source	Rating
Allmusic	3.5/5 stars
laut.de	1/5 stars

Da Capo is the fourth studio album by Swedish pop group Ace of Base. It was released in Europe on 30 September 2002 through Edel-Mega Records and Universal Music Group.

The album is named for the musical term da capo, meaning "back to the beginning." It was intended to be a return to the band's initial sound.

The album was released on clear and yellow vinyl for the first time in 2020.

== Background ==
The album was initially slated for a summer 2000 release, but problems with Ace of Base's record labels caused it to be delayed for another year. The band's record label demanded that many of the album's songs be reworked with additional producers. Ultimately, Da Capo came out at the end of September 2002, and resulted in very low album sales in many European territories. The album was planned to be released in the United States in 2003, but no release surfaced.

The minimal promotion was handled by two out of the four band members, Jenny Berggren and Ulf Ekberg. Jonas Berggren wanted to stay at home with his two children and Malin Berggren only attended one performance in Germany in 2002. During promotion Jenny and Ulf visited Sweden, Denmark, Norway, Finland, Germany, Poland and Austria.

In an interview, Ulf said that the group would release the album in the United States, with the songs being more acoustic. However, it never came out in America or Australia, although it has recently become available on iTunes. Polydor Records gave it a "soft release" in the UK on 21 October 2002 with no promotion nor any radio singles as Polydor believed that the band were no longer relevant to the British music scene. The album was released with Copy Control protection in some regions.

The title track was later featured on Dance Dance Revolution SuperNova in 2006. As of 2008, Da Capo has sold over 600,000 copies, far fewer than Ace of Base's earlier releases.

This is the last studio album with the original lineup to date.

== Track listing ==
Da Capo – Standard version
No.	Title	Writer(s)	Producer(s)	Length
1.	"Unspeakable"	Jonas "Joker" Berggren; Adam Anders; Nicklas von der Burg; Magnus Lindsten	von der Burg; Harry Sommerdahl; Joker	3:14
2.	"Beautiful Morning"	Joker; Jenny Berggren; Linn Berggren	Pontus Söderqvist; Axel Breitung^{[a]}; Kay Nickold^{[b]}	2:59
3.	"Remember the Words"	Joker; von der Burg; Sommerdahl; Anoo Bhagavan	von der Burg; Sommerdahl; Joker	3:43
4.	"Da Capo"	Joker	Thorsten Brötzmann; Jeo; von der Burg^{[c]}; Sommerdahl^{[c]}; Håkan Christoffersson^{[d]}; Joker^{[d]}	3:10
5.	"World Down Under"	Joker; von der Burg; Sommerdahl	von der Burg; Sommerdahl	3:32
6.	"Ordinary Day"	Joker	Söderqvist; Christoffersson^{[d]}; Joker^{[d]}	3:24
7.	"Wonderful Life"	Black	Thorsten Brötzmann; Jeo	4:15
8.	"Show Me Love"	Joker	Chief 1; Sommerdahl^{[c]}; von der Burg^{[c]}	3:42
9.	"What's the Name of the Game"	Joker; J. Berggren; L. Berggren; von der Burg; Sommerdahl	von der Burg; Sommerdahl; Joker	3:02
10.	"Change with the Light"	Joker; Ulf "Buddha" Ekberg; J. Berggren; L. Berggren	Söderqvist; Nick Nice; Buddha	3:35
11.	"Hey Darling"	Joker	Söderqvist; Nick Nice; Christoffersson^{[d]}; Joker^{[d]}	3:16
12.	"The Juvenile"	Joker	Söderqvist; Martin Hedström	3:45
Total length:				41:55

Da Capo – Japanese version
No.	Title	Writer(s)	Producer(s)	Length
13.	"Don't Stop"	Joker; Birthe Berggren; Arild Haugland	Joker; von der Burg; Sommerdahl	3:49
14.	"Summer Days"	Joker	Joker; von der Burg	3:46
15.	"Beautiful Morning" (Groove Radio Edit)	Joker; J. Berggren; L. Berggren	Pontus Söderqvist; Axel Breitung^{[a]}; Kay Nickold^{[b]}	2:47

Da Capo – Remastered version (bonus track)
No.	Title	Length
13.	"Da Capo" (alternative version)	3:26

Notes

- ^{^[a]} signifies a remixer
- ^{^[b]} signifies an assistant producer
- ^{^[c]} signifies a vocal producer
- ^{^[d]} signifies a co-producer

== Personnel ==
- Jonas "Joker" Berggren – arranger, producer
- Britta Bergström – backing vocals
- Anoo Bhagavan – backing vocals
- Tom Bohne – A&R
- Mathias Bothor – Photography
- Axel Breitung – guitar, remixing, vocal engineer
- Thorsten Brötzmann – keyboards
- Jakob Deichmann – A&R
- Tim Dobrovolny – A&R
- Thomas Eberger – Mastering
- Björn Engelmann – Mastering Cutting Room Studios
- Fiete Felsch – Soprano saxophone
- Par Lonn – Cello
- Nick Nice – programming, Multi-Instruments, Producer, Mixing
- Kay Nickold – Production Assistant
- Jeanette Olsson – backing vocals
- Assi Roar – bass
- Pontus Söderqvist – programming, Multi-Instruments, Producer, Mixing
- Harry "Slick" Sommerdahl – arranger, backing vocals, Producer, Vocal Producer
- Jonas Von Der Burg – arranger, producer, vocal producer

== Charts ==
Weekly chart performance for Da Capo
Chart (2002)	Peak position
Austrian Albums (Ö3 Austria)	61
Danish Albums (Hitlisten)	21
German Albums (Offizielle Top 100)	48
Japanese Albums (Oricon)	40
Norwegian Albums (VG-lista)	40
Swedish Albums (Sverigetopplistan)	25
Swiss Albums (Schweizer Hitparade)	23

== Release history ==
Da Capo release history
Region	Date	Label
Europe	30 September 2002	Mega / Universal
United Kingdom	21 October 2002	Polydor
Poland	21 October 2002	Polydor
Japan	5 March 2003	Toshiba EMI

== DVD ==
Da Capo

Video by Ace of Base
- Released: 21 October 2002
- Genre: Pop
- Length: 91 minutes
- Label: Polydor

The DVD contains all official Ace of Base videos released up to that point except "Travel to Romantis" and the acoustic U.S. version of "Lucky Love". It also includes the standard edition Da Capo album in 5.1 Surround Sound, a photo gallery, discography, and biographies in English and German.

=== Track listing ===
DVD track listing
No.	Title	Length
1.	"C'est La Vie (Always 21)"
2.	"The Sign"
3.	"Beautiful Life"
4.	"Always Have, Always Will"
5.	"All That She Wants"
6.	"Living in Danger"
7.	"Don't Turn Around"
8.	"Cruel Summer"
9.	"Happy Nation"
10.	"Lucky Love"
11.	"Never Gonna Say I'm Sorry"
12.	"Life Is a Flower"
13.	"Wheel of Fortune"
14.	"Beautiful Morning"
Total length:		91:00
