= Whatever Will Be, Will Be =

Whatever Will Be, Will Be may refer to:

- "Que Sera, Sera (Whatever Will Be, Will Be)", a 1956 popular song recorded by Doris Day
- Whatever Will Be, Will Be (1995 film), a Hong Kong musical and drama
- Whatever Will Be, Will Be (1997 film), a Hong Kong erotic drama
- Whatever Will Be, Will Be (TV series), a Singaporean television series

== See also ==
- Whatever Will Be, a 2005 album by Tammin
  - "Whatever Will Be" (song)
- Que sera (disambiguation)
