= Gold Collection =

Gold Collection may refer to:

- The Best of UFO: Gold Collection, 1996
- Too Much Too Young: The Gold Collection, 1996

== See also ==
- Platinum & Gold Collection (disambiguation)
