= Linn Berggren =

Swedish singer-songwriter (born 1970)

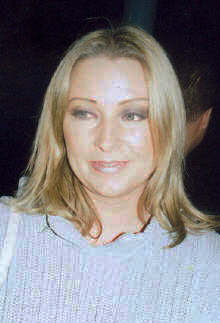
- Berggren in 2002

Background information
- Also known as: Linn
- Born: Malin Sofia Katarina Berggren; 31 October 1970 (age 56)
- Origin: Gothenburg, Sweden
- Occupations: Singer; songwriter
- Instruments: Vocals; keyboards
- Years active: 1987–2007

Malin Sofia Katarina Berggren (born 31 October 1970) is a former Swedish singer-songwriter, best known as a member of the pop music band Ace of Base. Having been interested and involved in music since her childhood, she formed the band in 1987, along with her sister Jenny, her brother Jonas and their friend Ulf Ekberg. Before forming Ace of Base, Malin sang in her church's choir. She was born in Gothenburg, Sweden.

When Ace of Base was signed to Danish label Mega Records in 1990, Malin, or Linn as she became known, chose to put her teaching career on hold.

In 1997, Linn said: "I wanted to sing; I never wanted to be a singer". That year, she began to fade out of the spotlight, leading to her last public appearance in 2002. According to her brother Jonas, Linn has been living a peaceful life since then. Her vocal range during her time with the group was contralto.

== Ace of Base ==
=== Frontwoman (1992–1996) ===
During the promotion for Ace of Base's first album, Linn was the principal lead vocalist for the majority of the singles and was generally the focus in the videos, although on some singles ("The Sign", "Waiting for Magic") and album tracks Jenny and Linn shared leads. Linn had a somewhat minor role in the composition of Happy Nation and The Sign, only having co-writing credits on one track on a re-release of the former. She was influential in the development of "All That She Wants", demanding that the track be changed from major key to minor.

In 1994, a German girl invaded the Berggren family home, targeting Linn. Linn was not present, but the girl attacked Jenny and her mother with a knife. This incident had a large impact on Linn.

During the release of the group's second album, The Bridge, the focus in both vocals and media became more equal with her younger sister, Jenny. Linn had a larger role in the composition of The Bridge and wrote and produced several songs for the album. Following the completion of the album, it was reported that Linn developed unspecified recurrent vocal problems.

Beginning in late 1995, Linn began to express discomfort in how successful the band had become, explaining in an interview "this business, I don't want to be in it for too long." She later remarked in a 1996 interview: "All this wasn't my plan. For me, this is too big, especially with the success in America. It doesn't look like it, but it costs a lot of energy to push yourself to success on this level. We have to push forward, but I just can't, I want to push backwards." She also explained her fear of flying, remarking "when the plane goes down, my heart skips a beat and I can't breathe, talk, speak or move." The band went on 179 flights for music promotion in 1995, which made Linn disenchanted with touring. In the same interview, she alluded to her plans for the future: "I've been thinking about travelling by train or car and doing very little promotion." In the midst of promotion in Asia for The Bridge in the spring of 1996, Linn left prematurely, leaving the rest of the band members to continue in her absence. Her final performance with the band as a frontwoman was of "Beautiful Life" at the World Music Awards in May 1996.

=== Background role (1997–2003) ===
In 1997, it was reported that Linn would venture into a solo project, releasing the song "Lapponia", which was previously submitted for inclusion on The Bridge and later for Flowers. The song was to be accompanied by a documentary about Sápmi culture. Despite this, the song never received an official release.

Beginning in 1997, Linn appeared at her band's concerts only to perform in the background behind keyboards. In Linn's last personal television interview, from 1997, she stated her wish to "try what Jenny has done" by no longer being the focus of the band. In April 1997, the band performed "Ravine" at the World Music Awards with Linn miming keyboard playing in the far background of the stage. Claes Cornelius at Mega Records said it was because she did not wish to wear the heavy make-up the performance would have required. In July 1997, the group performed a concert for Princess Victoria's 20th birthday. Linn generally performed keyboards in the background for most of the concert, but performed a live a cappella song in the foreground prior to the main show. That same year, both Jenny and Linn appeared at the Swedish Grammis as presenters for the "best song" award.

The first official press photos released for the Flowers / Cruel Summer albums, released on 21 March 1998, show Linn in equal or greater focus than that of her bandmates. However, many future promotional materials for the albums, as well as those used in the album booklets, contain blurred, unsmiling, distinctly unhappy photographs of her. The Flowers album in particular uses a photograph where Linn's unhappy image is bizarrely hidden behind the booklet's blue line design. According to Jonas, Clive Davis's insistence that Linn record "Everytime It Rains" for the Cruel Summer album in 1998 was "the tipping point" for Linn's withdrawal from the band and that it "was the worst thing for her". Jenny had recorded a version of the song, but Arista Records was unhappy with this version and pressed the band for Linn to record a version featuring only her vocals. Upon the release of the albums, Linn's vocal contributions were reduced in comparison to the group's previous releases. Beginning with "Life is a Flower", Linn's appearance in the band's music videos became much less than it had been in previous videos. She no longer mimed her vocal parts in the videos and her screen time was drastically shortened. Her image in the videos became at times blurred ("Cruel Summer") or almost nonexistent ("Travel to Romantis"). Linn walked off the set of the "Cruel Summer" music video in Rome whilst filming; her manager said it was because she did not wish to appear in the foreground of the video. Director Nigel Dick later revealed she would not have appeared at all, were it not for his insistence. Linn infrequently took part in group interviews with her other band members throughout 1998 for the promotion of the Flowers album, however, her participation was often minimal, and in many cases the band performed as a trio. In one such interview, however, Linn expressed her desire to further her music production skills. That year, Bravo magazine claimed that Linn was seriously ill, based on Linn's odd appearance on Germany's television spot The Dome, and photos appearing in Bravo. Linn granted one final radio interview on Mix FM in Lebanon in late 1998, where she talked about new album plans and sang "All That She Wants" a capella.

The band's management and record companies have explained Linn's odd behaviour with a number of reasons. In 1998, the band announced via their website that they would be placing media focus on Jenny due to Linn having recurring vocal problems. Linn's long-time fear of flying was also cited as the reason for her absence at the band's concerts. However, Linn also did not appear at events in Gothenburg and Copenhagen, where she would not have had to fly. The other band members have been somewhat reluctant to explain what has happened to Ace of Base's former lead singer. They have stated that she has always been a shy and retiring person and was happy to let Jenny lead the band, while Ulf Ekberg once claimed Linn had a "camera phobia". The knife attack on Jenny and her mother in 1994 may have also increased her reluctance to appear in public. In 2007, Ulf commented that Linn withdrew from the band's activities "for the simple reason that she did not want to [participate]."

In the "C'est la Vie (Always 21)" music video, filmed in 1999, Linn's image was no longer blurred or out of focus, and she appeared to be happy and an active participant. However, she still did not mime during her parts in the song and her screen time was significantly less than her bandmates. A photoshoot taken at the same time similarly shows her more in the spotlight. During this time, the group began promoting mainly as a duo with Jenny and Ulf, a strategy that Jonas remarked led to "less questions" about Linn's lack of participation, however, Linn did attend some performances of the single, albeit still relegated to a background role. In 2002, Linn co-wrote three tracks with her bandmates on the group's release Da Capo. However, her vocals appeared on fewer than half of the album's tracks. Her last public appearance was during the promotion of Da Capo in September 2002, where she showed up to a German television performance and mimed playing the keyboards in the background. A fan snapped a picture of a calm, smiling Linn outside the studio. Her final appearance with Ace of Base was in the Unspeakable music video which was filmed in December 2002. This video featured Linn in her first and only close-up shots in a music video since 1996. Linn has not been pictured since that year. On 24 September 2003, Linn's profile on the band's official website was updated, and it was noted that her favourite song from the Da Capo album was "Ordinary Day".

=== Hiatus (2004–2007) ===
In the spring of 2005, interviews with Linn's sister Jenny seemed to indicate Linn's desire to return to the spotlight again, but Linn still remained hidden from the public. In October and November 2005, the band made appearances at a series of 15 concerts at the Night of the Proms in Belgium; as usual, Linn was "unable to attend", and only Jonas, Ulf, and Jenny made appearances at these concerts. During this time, Linn also recorded backing vocals for the track "High Life" in Jenny's secondary band, Arose; the song was released on their debut album in February 2006. In 2006, it was mentioned that Ace of Base had recorded six new songs featuring vocals by both Malin and Jenny. Some of these tracks later surfaced on the 2015 release Hidden Gems.

=== Departure (2007) ===
According to an interview given by Ulf Ekberg on 20 June 2006, Malin returned to University to study Judaism and would record vocals on the band's new album. However, on 30 November 2007, Ulf stated in an interview that Malin Berggren had left the band and she would not appear on the band's new album. The group had already been performing mostly without Linn as a trio for a solid decade before her departure. Bandmate and sister Jenny confirmed Linn's departure in the Danish press: "She hasn't been part of Ace of Base for several years," she stated in Se & Hør magazine. Ulf remarked: "She has no craving to be famous, she loved her fans, but the fame factor was not for her." The remaining band members promised Linn that they would never ask her to rejoin the band ever again. Linn's image was removed from most material on the band's official website but was reintroduced upon the release of Hidden Gems.

== Personal life ==
Linn is multi-lingual: her primary language is Swedish, but she speaks fluent English and German; she also speaks Spanish, Russian and French. Other details of Linn's life, such as those of her life outside the band, are unknown to the public—whereas the other band members have been open about their relationships (Jonas and Jenny both have spouses, each with children, and Ulf has three children with his long-time girlfriend). As of 2015, Jonas confirmed he still sees Linn regularly and that she is enjoying a peaceful life with no interest in fame or returning to music.

== Contributions to Ace of Base music ==
=== Vocals ===
Linn has contributed vocals for all original Ace of Base songs except:

- Fashion Party (Jenny, Ulf, & Jonas)
- My Mind (Jenny & Ulf)
- Dimension of Depth (instrumental)
- Ravine (Jenny)
- Experience Pearls (Jenny)
- Wave Wet Sand (Jenny)
- Mercy Mercy (Jenny)
- I Pray (Jenny & Ulf)
- Donnie (US version) (Jenny)
- Don't Go Away (Jenny)
- Unspeakable (Jenny)
- Beautiful Morning (Jenny)
- Remember the Words (Jenny)
- World Down Under (Jenny)
- Wonderful Life (Jenny)
- What's The Name of The Game (Jenny)
- Show Me Love (Jenny)
- The Juvenile (Jenny)

=== Songwriting ===
Linn's writing credits for Ace of Base tracks:

- Hear Me Calling (with Jonas & Jenny Berggren and Ulf Ekberg)
- Strange Ways
- Whispers In Blindness (the "Dr. X-Ray" credited in this song, and whom Linn thanks in the acknowledgments for The Bridge, was her father, Göran Berggren, who played flute for the song)
- Just N Image
- Lapponia (demo)
- Love in December (with Jonas & Jenny Berggren and Ulf Ekberg)
- Beautiful Morning (with Jenny & Jonas Berggren)
- Change With the Light (with Jenny & Jonas Berggren and Ulf Ekberg)
- What's the Name of the Game (with Jenny & Jonas Berggren, Harry Sommerdahl, and Jonas von der Burg)
- Pole Position (with Jonas & Jenny Berggren and Ulf Ekberg)
- Moment of Magic (with Jonas & Jenny Berggren and Ulf Ekberg)
- Memories Forever (with Jonas & Jenny Berggren and Ulf Ekberg)

=== Song production ===
Linn's production credits for Ace of Base tracks:

- Strange Ways
- Whispers In Blindness
- Just N Image
- Lapponia

=== Other ===
- Performed at Princess Victoria's 20th birthday on 14 July 1997.
