= Platinum & Gold Collection (Ace of Base album) =

Greatest hits album by Ace of Base
- Released: 6 May 2003
- Recorded: 1992–1998
- Genre: Pop
- Label: Arista

Ace of Base chronology
The Collection/All That She Wants (2002)	Platinum & Gold Collection (2003)	The Ultimate Collection (2005)

Professional ratings
Review scores
Source	Rating
AllMusic	3.5/5 stars
The Rolling Stone Album Guide	3/5 stars

Platinum & Gold Collection is a 2003 Ace of Base compilation album, released in the United States. It has since been repackaged and sold as The Hits. It peaked at #16 on Billboard's Top Electronic Albums Chart on 16 October 2004.

== Track listing ==
1. "The Sign"
2. "Cruel Summer" (Cutfather & Joe Mix)
3. "Don't Turn Around"
4. "Lucky Love" (Original Version)
5. "All That She Wants"
6. "Everytime It Rains" (Metro Radio Mix)
7. "Whenever You're Near Me"
8. "Living in Danger" (D-House Radio Mix)
9. "Happy Nation" (Radio Edit)
10. "Wheel of Fortune"
11. "Never Gonna Say I'm Sorry"
12. "Beautiful Life"
