= Platinum & Gold Collection =

Platinum & Gold Collection may refer to:

- Platinum & Gold Collection (Ace of Base album), 2003
- Platinum & Gold Collection (Cowboy Junkies album), 2003
- Platinum & Gold Collection (Jefferson Airplane album), 2003
- Platinum & Gold Collection (Lit album), 2004
- Platinum & Gold Collection (SWV album), 2003
- Platinum & Gold Collection (The Verve Pipe album), 2004
- Platinum & Gold Collection (Toni Braxton album), 2004

== See also ==
- The Platinum and Gold Collection – Rick Astley, 2004
