= Que sera =

Que sera or Que sera, sera may also refer to:

== Film and television ==
- Que sera, sera (film), a 2002 Brazilian comedy
- Que Sera (film), a 2014 Sri Lankan comedy romance
- "Que Sera Sera" (House), a 2006 TV episode
- Que Sera, Sera (TV series), a 2007 South Korean TV series

== Music ==
- Que Sera Sera (album), by Johnny Thunders, 1985
- "Que Sera, Sera (Whatever Will Be, Will Be)", a 1955 Livingston and Evans popular song, recorded by Doris Day in 1956
- "Que Será", a cha-cha-chá released by Tito Puente in 1956
- "Que Sera" (Justice Crew song), 2014
- "Que Sera" (Medina song), 2024
- "Que Sera", a song by Miley Cyrus on the 2010 soundtrack album Hannah Montana Forever
- "Que Sera", a 1995 song by Ace of Base
- "Que Sera", a 2009 song by O'Hooley & Tidow
- "Que sera", a 2004 song by Wax Tailor
- "Kay Sera Sera", a song by A. R. Rahman, Kavita Krishnamurthy and Shankar Mahadevan from the 2000 Indian film Pukar
- "Que Sera Sera", a 2020 song by Atarashii Gakko!

== Other ==
- Que Sera crystal also called Llanite
- K Sera Sera Limited, an Indian film company

== See also ==
- "K Cera Cera", a 1993 single by The K Foundation presents The Red Army Choir
- "Che sarà", 1971 Italian song
- "Que Sera Mi Vida (If You Should Go)", a 1979 song by the Gibson Brothers
