= Night of the Proms 2005 =

2005 European musical touring event

Night of the Proms 2005 was a European musical touring event in 2005. This CD compilation contains songs from the tour, including "The Sign" and "All That She Wants" by Ace of Base. It also included other artists like Donna Summer, Safri Duo, Roger Daltrey (from The Who). The CD was released by Sony BMG Music in Belgium on December 20, 2005.

== Track listing ==
1. Roger Daltrey - Without Your Love [4:37]
2. Il Novecento - Hungarian Dance No.5 (J. Brahms) [2:38]
3. Safri Duo - Played Alive [4:10]
4. Ace Of Base - The Sign/All That She Wants [4:50]
5. Il Novecento - Once Upon A Time In The West/Harmonica Solo: John Miles [7:25]
6. John Miles - Sarabande & Broken Wings [7:00]
7. Il Novecento - Hooked On Mozart [4:17]
8. John Miles - Music
9. Il Novecento - Ritual Fire Dance/Piano: Robert Groslot [3:42]
10. Safri Duo - Safri's Bravoure
11. Thé Lau - Iedereen Is Van De Wereld
12. Il Novecento - Emperor Waltz [5:57]
13. Donna Summer - MacArthur Park [6:01]
14. Donna Summer, Ace Of Base & Safri Duo - State of Independence [6:02]
