= Nazad, nazad, Kalino mome =

Traditional folk song from the region of Macedonia

Nazad, nazad, Kalino mome (Bulgarian: Назад, назад, моме Калино, Macedonian: Назад, назад, Калино моме, English: Go back, go back, girl Kalina) is a traditional folk song from the region of Macedonia. It's in the time signature of 7/8. The song was performed by the Swedish pop group Ace of Base during their concert in Lovech, Bulgaria in May 2008. Other famous performers include Jovan Jovanov, Aleksandra Pileva, Slavi Trifonov, Nevena Tsoneva and Gloria among others. The norwegian composer Thomas J. Bergersen has featured part of the lyrics in his song "Never give up on your dreams", from the album Unleashed, of the company Two Steps from Hell. He has composed other songs in the Bulgarian language, such as "Colors of Love", "Fearless", "Rada" or "Starvation".
