= Beautiful Morning =

Single by Ace of Base

from the album Da Capo
- Released: 9 September 2002
- Genre: Pop
- Length: 3:30
- Label: Mega
- Songwriters: Jenny Berggren, Jonas Berggren, Linn Berggren

Ace of Base singles chronology
| "Hallo Hallo" (2000) | "Beautiful Morning" (2002) | "The Juvenile" (2002) |

Music video
- "Beautiful Morning" on YouTube

"Beautiful Morning" is the lead single for Ace of Base's 2002 record Da Capo. "Beautiful Morning" was released in September 2002 in Europe. On the charts the song was a minor hit. The song was written by the three Berggren siblings (Jonas, Jenny and Malin) in dedication to the passing of their father.

== Music video ==
A music video was produced to promote the single. The video was directed by Daniel Borjesson.

== Track listing ==
Scandinavia/Germany

Maxi CD

1. Beautiful Morning (Album Version)
2. Beautiful Morning (Spanish Fly Radio Edit)
3. Beautiful Morning (Groove Radio Edit)
4. Beautiful Morning (Spanish Fly Club Version)
5. Beautiful Morning (Video)

CD single

1. Beautiful Morning (Album Version)
2. Beautiful Morning (Groove Radio Edit)

== Official versions/remixes ==
- Album Version
- Groove Radio Edit
- Spanish Fly Radio Edit
- Spanish Fly Club Version

== Release history ==
| Region | Date | Label |
|---|---|---|
| Sweden | 9 September 2002 | Mega |
| Germany | 16 September 2002 | Polydor |

== Charts ==
| Chart | Peak position |
|---|---|
| Austrian Singles Chart | 47 |
| Danish Singles Chart | 18 |
| Israel Singles Chart | 2 |
| German Singles Chart | 38 |
| Swiss Singles Chart | 32 |
| Swedish Singles Chart | 14 |
