= The Juvenile =

Single by Ace of Base

from the album Da Capo
- B-side: "What's the Name of the Game"
- Released: 9 December 2002
- Genre: Pop
- Length: 3:30
- Label: Mega
- Songwriter: Jonas Berggren

Ace of Base singles chronology
"Beautiful Morning" (2002)	"The Juvenile" (2002)	"Unspeakable" (2002)

"The Juvenile" is a song by Swedish pop band Ace of Base.

It was released as the second single from their album Da Capo in Germany released in December 2002. It was originally written in 1995, as the proposed theme song to the 1995 James Bond film GoldenEye, but Arista Records pulled the band out of the project. The song was then re-written as "The Juvenile" and still released as a single.

The chorus of the song is very similar to the original version, just with a different line "the juvenile" instead of "the Goldeneye".

== Charts ==
Chart	Peak position
German Singles Chart	78

== Track listing ==
- CD single (2002) 065 858-2
1. "The Juvenile" - 3:44
2. "What's the Name of the Game" - 3:02
3. "Don't Stop" - 3:48
4. "Hey Darling" (German album version) - 3:16
