= Flowers (Ace of Base album) =

Studio album by Ace of Base
- Released: 15 June 1998
- Recorded: September 1997 – Early 1998
- Genre: Pop
- Length: 56:20 (UK)
- Label: Mega
- Producers: Per Adebratt; John Amatiello; Jonas "Joker" Berggren; Douglas Carr; Cutfather & Joe; Ulf "Buddha" Ekberg; Tommy Ekman; Ole Evenrude; Charles Fisher; Stephen Hague; Johnny Jam & Delgado; StoneStream

Ace of Base chronology
The Bridge (1995)	Flowers (1998)	Cruel Summer (1998)

Singles from Flowers
- 1. "Life Is a Flower" Released: 6 April 1998; 2. "Cruel Summer" Released: 6 July 1998; 3. "Travel to Romantis" Released: 16 November 1998; 4. "Always Have Always Will" Released: 7 December 1998; 5. "Everytime It Rains" Released: 5 April 1999; 6. "Cecilia" Released: June 1999

Professional ratings
Review scores
Source	Rating
AllMusic	3/5 stars
Q	2/5 stars
The Encyclopedia of Popular Music	2/5 stars

Flowers is the third studio album by Swedish pop group Ace of Base. It was released in Europe on 15 June 1998 through Mega Records. An alternative album titled Cruel Summer was released in the US and Canada, containing remixes, re-recordings, and new songs deemed appropriate for an American audience. Japan and Australia received hybrid versions of the two albums.

The album was re-issued in the UK on 26 April 1999 with revised artwork and track listing, following the single release of "Everytime It Rains".

== Background ==
Flowers spawned the singles "Life Is a Flower", "Cruel Summer" and "Always Have, Always Will".

In his 2015 book The Song Machine, writer Joh Seabrook called the album "Motown inspired".

== Track listing ==
Flowers – Standard version
No.	Title	Lyrics	Music	Producer(s)	Length
1.	"Life Is a Flower"	Jonas "Joker" Berggren	Joker	Tommy Ekman; Per Adebratt; Joker	3:47
2.	"Always Have, Always Will"	Mike Chapman	Joker	Ole Evenrude	3:46
3.	"Cruel Summer"	Sara Dallin; Siobhan Fahey; Keren Woodward; Steve Jolley; Tony Swain	Dallin; Fahey; Woodward; Jolley; Swain	Cutfather & Joe	3:35
4.	"Travel to Romantis"	Joker	Joker	Joker; Johnny Jam & Delgado	4:10
5.	"Adventures in Paradise"	Joker; Joe Belmaati; Mich Hansen	Joker; Belmaati; Hansen	Cutfather & Joe	3:32
6.	"Dr. Sun"	Joker	Joker	Douglas Carr; John Amatiello; Joker	3:35
7.	"Cecilia"	Joker	Joker	Ekman; Adebratt; Joker	3:55
8.	"He Decides"	Jenny Berggren	J. Berggren	Carr; Peo Hägström	3:09
9.	"I Pray"	Ulf "Buddha" Ekberg; John Ballard	Buddha; Ballard	Charles Fisher; Buddha; StoneStream^{[a]}	3:16
10.	"Tokyo Girl"	Billy Steinberg; Ralph McCarthy; Joker	Joker	Johnny Jam & Delgado; Carr^{[b]}; Amatiello^{[b]}; Joker^{[b]}	3:36
11.	"Don't Go Away"	Buddha; Ballard	Buddha; Ballard	Fisher; Buddha; StoneStream^{[a]}	3:41
12.	"Captain Nemo"	Joker	Joker	Carr; Amatiello; Joker	4:02
13.	"Donnie"	Joker	Joker	Carr; Amatiello; Joker	4:39
14.	"Cruel Summer" (big bonus mix)	Dallin; Fahey; Woodward; Jolley; Swain	Dallin; Fahey; Woodward; Jolley; Swain	Stephen Hague; Joker; Buddha; Johnny Jam & Delgado^{[a]}	4:07

Flowers – French version (bonus track)
No.	Title	Lyrics	Music	Producer(s)	Length
15.	"Cruel Summer" (featuring Alliage) (radio version)	Dallin; Fahey; Woodward; Jolley; Swain	Dallin; Fahey; Woodward; Jolley; Swain	Steve Mac	3:28

Flowers – UK re-issue version (bonus track)
No.	Title	Lyrics	Music	Producer(s)	Length
14.	"Everytime It Rains"	Steinberg; Rick Nowels; Maria Vidal	Steinberg; Nowels; Vidal	Cutfather & Joe	4:51

Flowers – Remastered version (bonus track)
No.	Title	Length
15.	"L'amour"	3:37

Flowers – Australian version
No.	Title	Length
1.	"Cruel Summer"
2.	"Donnie" (Ole Evenrude Version)
3.	"Whenever You're Near Me"
4.	"Everytime It Rains"
5.	"Adventures In Paradise"
6.	"Don't Go Away"
7.	"Cecilia"
8.	"He Decides" (Charles Fisher Mix)
9.	"Always Have Always Will"
10.	"Tokyo Girl"
11.	"Travel to Romantis" (Larossi Mix)
12.	"Cruel Summer" (Big Bonus Mix)
13.	"Life Is a Flower"

Flowers – All That She Wants: The Classic Collection
No.	Title	Length
14.	"Everytime It Rains"

Notes

- ^{^[a]} signifies an additional producer
- ^{^[a]} signifies pre-production

== Release history ==
Region	Date	Label
Europe	15 June 1998	Mega / PolyGram
United Kingdom	10 August 1998	London Records 90
Australia	16 November 1998	Polydor
United Kingdom (re-issue)	26 April 1999	London Records 90

== Charts ==
=== Weekly charts ===
Chart (1998)	Peak position
Austrian Albums (Ö3 Austria)	15
Belgian Albums (Ultratop Flanders)	35
Dutch Albums (Album Top 100)	50
Finnish Albums (Suomen virallinen lista)	2
French Albums (SNEP)	16
German Albums (Offizielle Top 100)	3
Hungarian Albums (MAHASZ)	7
Italian Albums (Musica e dischi)	25
Norwegian Albums (VG-lista)	12
Scottish Albums (Official Charts)	31
Swedish Albums (Sverigetopplistan)	5
Swiss Albums (Schweizer Hitparade)	1
UK Albums (Official Charts)	15

=== Year-end charts ===
Chart (1998)	Position
German Albums (Offizielle Top 100)	72
Swiss Albums (Schweizer Hitparade)	46

== Certifications ==
Region	Certification	Certified units/sales
Switzerland (IFPI Switzerland)	Gold	25,000^{^}
United Kingdom (BPI)	Silver	60,000^{^}
^{^} Shipments figures based on certification alone.
