= Cecilia (Ace of Base song) =

Single by Ace of Base

from the album Flowers
- Released: June 1999
- Recorded: Barn Studio; Hitsville Production Studios
- Genre: Pop
- Length: 3:55
- Label: Many Records; Polydor
- Songwriter(s): Jonas Berggren
- Producer(s): Ole Evenrud

Ace of Base singles chronology
"Everytime It Rains" (1999)	"Cecilia" (1999)	"C'est la Vie (Always 21)" (1999)

"Cecilia" is a song from Ace of Base's third record titled Flowers. It was released as a single in Italy and Spain in the spring of 1999. The song was written as a continuation of the song of the same name by Simon & Garfunkel. A standard disc single was never made commercially available, however, a 12" vinyl record was released in Italy featuring previously unreleased remixes. The song was released promotionally in Spain alongside "Travel To Romantis".

== Critical reception ==
Swedish newspaper Aftonbladet picked "Cecilia" as one of Ace of Base's songs "that are going to be hits". Quentin Harrison of Albumism said in his retrospective review of Flowers, that the band "construct whole worlds of ennui and escapism for listeners to experience" via songs like "Cecilia". He also noted that the song "boldly picks up where the Simon & Garfunkel tune of the same name left off in 1970, continuing her character arc. The track is also a show-stopping number for Jenny as she handles the principal vocal." Chuck Campbell from The Daily News described it as "an instantly infectious" song "that briliantly [sic?] blends a horn section, a string section and a rubbery electronic rhythm."

== Track listings ==
=== Italy 12" Vinyl ===
1. Cecilia (Ole Evenrude Radio Mix)
2. Cecilia (Ole Evenrude Mix)
3. Cecilia (In Da Nite Mix)

=== Spain Promo CD ===
1. Cecilia (Album Version)
2. Travel To Romantis (Album Version)
