= Unspeakable (song) =

Single by Ace of Base

from the album Da Capo
- B-side: "Don't Stop"
- Released: 2 December 2002
- Genre: Pop
- Length: 3:30
- Label: Mega
- Songwriters: Adam Anders; Jonas Berggren; M. Lindsten; Nicklas Von Der Burg

Ace of Base singles chronology
"The Juvenile" (2002)	"Unspeakable" (2002)	"Wheel of Fortune 2009" (2008)

Music video
- "Unspeakable on YouTube

"Unspeakable" is a single from Ace of Base's 2002 album Da Capo.

== Chart performance ==
The single peaked at number 3 in Israel, 14 in Finland, 45 in Sweden and 97 in Germany.

== Music video ==
A music video was produced to promote the single. The video was directed by Daniel Borjesson. This was the last Ace of Base video to receive participation from Malin.

The video features a taxi driver driving a Citroën DS cab through Stockholm during a night shift, listening to the song on his car's radio. The band members are then projected on several buildings throughout the city. The driver ends up picking up two passengers, but doesn't realize they are Ulf and Jenny, who start singing along during the ride. Eventually, the taxi driver arrives back home at the morning light, then turns on the TV, where the music video is playing, finally showing the driver. As the song ends, the driver has passed out on the couch.

== Tracklistings ==
Scandinavia/Germany

CD single

1. "Unspeakable" (Album Version)
2. "Unspeakable" (Junk & Function / M12 Radio Mix)

CD maxi

1. "Unspeakable" (Album Version)
2. "Unspeakable" (Junk & Function / M12 Radio Mix)
3. "Unspeakable" (Fairlite Radio Mix)
4. "Unspeakable" (Filur Radio Mix)
5. "Don't Stop" (Unreleased Track)

== Official versions/remixes ==
- Album Version
- Fairlite Radio Mix
- Fairlite Dub Mix
- Fairlite Instrumental
- Filur Radio Mix
- Filur Club Remix
- Filur Dub Remix
- Junk&Function/M12 Club Mix
- Junk&Function/M12 Radio Mix

== Release history ==
Region	Date	Label
Sweden	2 December 2002	Mega
Germany	12 April 2003	Polydor

== Charts ==
Chart	Peak position
German Singles Chart	97
Israel Singles Chart	3
Swedish Singles Chart	45
Finnish Singles Chart	14
