= Always Have, Always Will (Ace of Base song) =

1998 single by Ace of Base

Single by Ace of Base

from the album Flowers
- B-side: "Love for Sale"
- Released: 7 December 1998
- Studio: Hitsville Productions; LaCarr Studios
- Genre: Pop
- Length: 3:48
- Label: Mega
- Songwriters: Mike Chapman; Jonas Berggren
- Producer: Ole Evenrude

Ace of Base singles chronology
"Travel to Romantis" (1998)	"Always Have, Always Will" (1998)	"Everytime It Rains" (1999)

Music video
- "Always Have, Always Will" on YouTube

"Always Have, Always Will" is a 1998 song by Swedish pop band Ace of Base. Heavily inspired by the Motown sound of the mid-1960s, the intro samples the intros from the Supremes track "Where Did Our Love Go" and the Four Tops track "I Can't Help Myself (Sugar Pie Honey Bunch)". It was co-written by Jonas Berggren with Mike Chapman. The song was originally titled "Killer on the Rampage" and contained different lyrics. When the song was pitched as a potential song for the band's then-upcoming album, their record label liked the melody; however, they requested that the lyrics be rewritten.

The song was released as the fourth single from Ace of Base's third album, Flowers (1998), on 7 December 1998. The song failed to chart in the band's native Sweden but entered the top 40 in several European countries, including Austria, Ireland, Switzerland and the United Kingdom.

== Critical reception ==
Swedish newspaper Aftonbladet wrote that the song "ties ecstatic summery serpentines between classic girl-pop and glittery seventies disco". Quentin Harrison of Albumism described it as "classic Motown", adding that Ace of Base "showcase their expertise at branching out." AllMusic editor Bryan Buss called it a "'50s throwback". Chuck Campbell from The Daily News wrote that it "bask in an affable warmth never before divulged by the cold Swedes." An editor from Expressen commented that it "begins as" Supremes "Baby Love", "then lets go of the Motown-bass and becomes a 90s version" of Chip's Melodifestival song "Dag efter dag". Gary Shipes from The Stuart News noted that the "faux Motown bounce" of the "teen-idol homage" "Donnie" and "Always Have, Always Will", "with their sterling sawing strings and crystalline melodies, are begging to be blasting out of car radios everywhere."

== Music video ==
The accompanying music video for the song was directed by the band members themselves. It used footage from recording sessions, concerts and appearances of the band all across the world.

== Track listings ==
- European CD single
1. "Always Have, Always Will" – 3:47
2. "Mercy Mercy" – 3:38
- UK CD single
1. "Always Have, Always Will" 3:47
2. "Love for Sale" – 3:37
3. "Whenever You're Near Me" – 3:32
- UK CD single 2
1. "Always Have, Always Will" – 3:47
2. "Mercy Mercy" – 3:38
3. "Living in Danger" (D-House mix – short version) – 4:04
- Australian and German CD maxi
1. Always Have Always Will – 3:47
2. Mercy Mercy – 3:38
3. Living in Danger (D-House mix – short version) – 4:04
4. Love for Sale – 3:37
- Scandinavian CD maxi
1. Always Have Always Will – 3:47
2. Captain Nemo – 4:01
3. Love for Sale – 3:37

== Charts ==
Weekly chart performance for "Always Have, Always Will"
Chart (1999)	Peak position
Australia (ARIA)	61
Austria (Ö3 Austria Top 40)	29
Belgium (Ultratop 50 Flanders)	44
Europe (Eurochart Hot 100)	59
Germany (GfK)	47
Ireland (IRMA)	15
Netherlands (Single Top 100)	78
Poland Airplay (Music & Media)	2
Scottish Singles Sales (Official Charts)	10
Switzerland (Schweizer Hitparade)	29
UK Airplay (Media Monitor)	14
UK Singles (OCC)	12

=== Year-end charts ===
Year-end chart performance for "Always Have, Always Will"
Chart (1998)	Position
Europe Border Breakers (Music & Media)	14
UK Singles (OCC)	147

== Certifications ==
Certifications for "Always Have, Always Will"
Region	Certification	Certified units/sales
United Kingdom (BPI)	Silver	200,000^{‡}
^{‡} Sales+streaming figures based on certification alone.

== Release history ==
Region	Date	Label	Ref.
United Kingdom	7 December 1998	London	
Germany	1 March 1999	Polydor	
