= Everytime It Rains =

1999 single by Ace of Base

Single by Ace of Base

from the album Flowers
- Released: 5 April 1999
- Studio: C&J
- Length: 4:47
- Label: London; Mega; Polydor
- Songwriters: Billy Steinberg; Rick Nowels; Maria Vidal
- Producer: Cutfather & Joe

Ace of Base singles chronology
"Always Have, Always Will" (1998)	"Everytime It Rains" (1999)	"Cecilia" (1999)

"Everytime It Rains" is the fourth single released from Swedish band Ace of Base's album Flowers in the UK, featured on a re-release of the album. The song was written for Annie Lennox by Rick Nowels, Billy Steinberg, and Maria Vidal. The single peaked at number 22 in the UK in April 1999.

For the song's release in the US audience, British producers Mark Taylor and Jeff Taylor reworked the recording into an uptempo dance oriented version targeted at American audiences. In March 2000, the single was serviced to US radio stations as the lead single in support of the band's first Greatest Hits compilation. The single failed to chart in the Billboard Hot 100 and was the groups first single that did not receive a commercial release.

== Background ==
"The tipping point, for Linn anyway, was when she was forced to sing a track about “getting wet” that Jenny already had sung but they (the American label) only wanted 100% Linn on the track. Linn said to me once that it was the worst thing for her. It made it even more difficult between Jenny and Linn – Jenny felt bad-neglected. Linn felt terrible-forced to sing a lyric she didn’t like and at the same time push Jenny away. Impossible situation around Everytime It Rains. I don’t like that track one bit, it killed us so to say – The tipping point anyway."

— Jonas Berggren talking to Renowned for Sound about the song.

Clive Davis of Arista Records, who had suggested the band cover "Don't Turn Around" for The Sign, requested for Malin Berggren to record Everytime It Rains for Cruel Summer, as she had no solo songs on the album. Jenny Berggren initially recorded the track when Malin, looking to take a secondary role in the band, ignored Davis's demands. According to Jonas Berggren, once Davis found out that the track had not been recorded by the vocalist of his choosing as instructed, he called Malin and cautioned her regarding Ace of Base's future in the Americas. Linn promptly flew to Norway to record her vocals. However, in continued protest, she only allowed for one take. This one vocal take was used for the released version. "She was sad", Jonas Berggren wrote to fans about the incident in February 2011. "And you can hear she didn't like it [...] it was after that incident that she decided she didn't want to be involved in the music industry anymore."

== Critical reception ==
Quentin Harrison of Albumism described Linn's vocal performance in the song as "gorgeous" in his retrospective review of Flowers. AllMusic editor Bryan Buss called it "poetic". David Browne from Entertainment Weekly wrote that "Everytime It Rains" is "the best song Celine Dion never recorded." Gary Shipes from The Stuart News noted that "the gorgeous ballad" "oozes maturity and confidence". He added that the song could send Ace of Base scurrying to pop glory again."

== Track listings ==
UK CD1

1. "Everytime It Rains" (radio edit)
2. "Everytime It Rains" (Soul Poets club mix)
3. "Travel to Romantis" (Wolf mix)

UK CD2

1. "Everytime It Rains" (radio edit)
2. "Into the Night of Blue"
3. "Living in Danger" (New Buddha version)

US cassette single

1. "Everytime It Rains" (radio edit)
2. "Everytime It Rains" (Soul Poets club mix)

== Charts ==
Chart (1999–2000)	Peak position
Canada Adult Contemporary (RPM)	70
Europe (Eurochart Hot 100)	91
Scottish Singles Sales (Official Charts)	17
UK Singles (Official Charts)	22

== Release history ==
Region	Date	Format(s)	Label(s)	Ref.
United Kingdom	5 April 1999	CD; cassette	London; Mega; Polydor	
United States	28 March 2000	Contemporary hit radio	Arista	
