= Travel to Romantis =

Single by Ace of Base

from the album Flowers
- Released: 16 November 1998
- Studio: The Barn Studio, Gothenburg; Skylab Studio
- Genre: Eurodance; pop
- Length: 4:07
- Label: Mega Records; Polydor
- Songwriter: Jonas Berggren
- Producers: Johnny Jam & Delgado; Jonas Berggren

Ace of Base singles chronology
"Whenever You're Near Me" (1998)	"Travel to Romantis" (1998)	"Always Have, Always Will" (1998)

Music video
- "Travel to Romantis" on YouTube

"Travel to Romantis" is the third single from Flowers, an album by Swedish pop band Ace of Base. The song was released on 16 November 1998 in Germany and Scandinavia and followed the singles "Life Is a Flower" and "Cruel Summer".

== Critical reception ==
Quentin Harrison of Albumism said in his retrospective review of Flowers, that the band "construct whole worlds of ennui and escapism for listeners to experience" via songs like "Travel to Romantis". Swedish newspaper Expressen commented that it "is Neil Sedakas One Way Ticket (to the Blues) such as one early Modern Talking would have made it." Gary Shipes from The Stuart News described it as "a frothy gallop which reintroduces early '90s Eurodance to late '90s ennui."

== Music video ==
A music video was produced to promote the single. The video was directed by Andy Neumann. Linn Berggren appeared in the video, however only for a few seconds.

== Tracks ==
Scandinavia

CD single

1. Travel to Romantis
2. Whenever You're Near Me (Previously Unreleased) 3:32

Maxi CD

1. Travel to Romantis (Album Version) 4:11
2. Travel to Romantis (Josef Larossi Mix) 5:33
3. Travel to Romantis (Love to Infinity Mix) 7:22
4. Whenever You're Near Me (Previously Unreleased) 3:32

Germany

CD single

1. Travel to Romantis
2. Whenever You're Near Me (Previously Unreleased) 3:32

Maxi CD

1. Travel to Romantis 4:11
2. Cruel Summer (Cutfather & Joe Mix) 3:33
3. The Sign 3:10
4. Beautiful Life 3:40
5. Whenever You're Near Me (Previously Unreleased) 3:32

== Official versions/remixes ==
- Album Version
- Radio Edit
- Eurotracks Extended Mix
- Larossi Extended Mix
- Larossi Short Mix
- Love To Infinity Master Mix
- Love To Infinity Radio Edit
- Wolf Mix

== Charts ==
Weekly chart performance for "Travel to Romantis"
Chart (1998–99)	Peak position
Germany (GfK)	61
Romania (Romanian Singles Chart)	13
Russia (Russian Singles Chart)	3

Annual chart rankings for "Hanging Around"
Chart (1999)	Rank
European Airplay (Border Breakers)	59
