= Treasure Coast Newspapers =

Newspaper in Florida, United States

TCPalm/Treasure Coast Newspapers
- Type: Daily newspaper
- Format: Broadsheet
- Owner: USA Today Co.
- Founder: Scripps-Howard
- Editor: Adam Neal
- Opinion editor: Laurence Reisman
- Language: English
- Headquarters: Florida
- City: Port St. Lucie, Florida
- Country: United States
- Sister newspapers: Florida Today, The News-Press, Naples Daily News, Pensacola News Journal, Tallahassee Democrat, Palm Beach Post, The Daytona Beach News-Journal
- Website: tcpalm.com

TCPalm is the digital news site for Treasure Coast Newspapers, the largest daily news operation on the Treasure Coast of southeastern Florida. The region encompasses three coastal counties: Martin County, St. Lucie County and Indian River County. Treasure Coast Newspapers publishes three daily print newspapers: The Stuart News, St. Lucie News Tribune and the Indian River Press Journal, as well as the weekly Luminaries. The site was launched by Scripps Howard newspapers in 1996, and has been owned by USA Today Co. since 2016.

== History ==
Treasure Coast Newspapers was originally a group formed under the E.W. Scripps company, which acquired the Stuart-based Martin County paper in 1965; the Jupiter-based weekly publication in 1978; the Vero Beach-based Indian River newspaper in 1997; and the Fort Pierce-based St. Lucie newspaper in 2000. The Jupiter Courier, Sebastian Sun, Vero Beach Newsweekly and YourNews were other weekly newspapers formerly published by owners Scripps, Journal Media Group and finally Gannett. The group has also published several weekly business and lifestyle publications.

The Stuart News grew out of the merger of the Stuart Times (1913) and Stuart Messenger (1915), which was sold to the Clyma family in 1922. They converted the publication into a daily newspaper called the Stuart Daily News in 1925, claiming then that Stuart was the smallest town in the U.S. to have a daily newspaper. Sold to Edwin A. Menninger in 1928, it was renamed the Stuart News when it became a weekly in 1934. The newspaper was sold to Gordon B. Lockwood in 1957 and then Scripps in 1965, expanding to 5-day publication in 1973. A St. Lucie edition was added in 1976. The newspaper returned to daily publication in 1984, when it became a morning paper.

The Fort Pierce-based St. Lucie News Tribune dates its origins to 1903 as the result of a 1920 merger of two weekly newspapers (the Fort Pierce News and the St. Lucie County Tribune). It switched to daily publication in 1926 and had been owned by Freedom Communications since 1969. In 2000, Scripps traded two northwest Florida newspapers, The Destin Log (founded 1974, acquired by Scripps in 1984) and The Walton County Log (founded by Scripps in 1992), to Freedom for the News Tribune.

The origins of the Indian River Press Journal lie in the weekly Vero Press, first published by Paul Nisle in 1919. In early 1926, brothers R.B. and J.C. Brossier, along with J.F. Schumann and son John Justin, arrived from the Orlando Reporter-Star and started the thrice-weekly Vero Beach Journal. A slowing economy weighed on both papers, including forcing the Press to cut back to weekly publication in January 1927 from its expanded six-day production schedule. The Press was bought out by the Schumann group and the first edition of the weekly Vero Beach Press Journal was published in May 1927. During the 1970s, the newspaper changed from an afternoon to a morning edition and gradually added publication days until it became a daily in 1982. At the time of its sale to Scripps in 1997, it was the last daily newspaper in Florida wholly owned by a family.
