= Life Is a Flower =

1998 single by Ace of Base

Single by Ace of Base

from the album Flowers
- B-side: "No Good Lover"
- Released: 6 April 1998
- Length: 3:47
- Label: Mega
- Songwriter: Jonas "Joker" Berggren
- Producers: Jonas "Joker" Berggren; Per Adebratt; Tommy Ekman

Ace of Base singles chronology
"Never Gonna Say I'm Sorry" (1996)	"Life Is a Flower" (1998)	"Cruel Summer" (1998)

Music video
- "Life Is a Flower" on YouTube

"Life Is a Flower" is a song by the Swedish group Ace of Base, released in Europe on 6 April 1998 by Mega Records as the first single from the group's third album, Flowers (1998). The song peaked at number one in Hungary and was a top-10 hit in Denmark, Finland, Scotland, Spain, Sweden and the United Kingdom. In the United States, it was released with different lyrics, titled "Whenever You're Near Me", and in a different key. Jonas Berggren, writer of the song, described it as is his greatest Ace of Base song in a 2015 interview.

== Critical reception ==
AllMusic editor Bryan Buss described the song as acoustic. A reviewer from Irish Evening Herald called it a gem, adding that "more of the same can often be a good thing". Sweden's Expressen viewed it as a "safe card", while Göteborgsposten wrote that it is "almost religiously positive". David Brinn from Jerusalem Post noted that the single is a staple on local radio, "with its optimistic melody and pop psychology message so full of the power of positive thinking that the late Dr. Norman Vincent Peale should have received co-writing credit." Pan-European magazine Music & Media commented, "Although the sound and style on the latest single remains unmistakably that of Ace of Base, the Swedish outfit have still been able to reinvent themselves enough to stay relevant and keep pace with dance scene developments."

Bernhard Hiller, head of music at AC/CHR outlet 104.6 RTL/Berlin said, "It is a great comeback for them. The good thing is that they have managed to change their sound while still sounding like Ace of Base." He added, "Of course, this record is an absolute blessing for radio; we added it as soon as it got in, and currently we are playing it 15–20 times a week. At first audience response was less than overwhelming-but then again it is still early days; and besides, how can an audience like records when you don't allow the listeners to get to know the tracks?"

"My favorite track from Ace Of Base is Life is a Flower. I think that song shows the pure essence of what we are as a band; summer vibes, twisted happy lyrics, poppy melodies, nice beats and a choir in the end. Perfect!"

— Jonas Berggren talking to Renowned for Sound about the song.

== Chart performance ==
"Life Is a Flower" peaked at number one in Hungary and entered the top 10 in Denmark, Finland, Spain, Sweden and the United Kingdom. In the UK, the single debuted at its peak of number five on the UK Singles Chart, on 19 July 1998. It was also a top-20 hit in Austria, France, Germany, Ireland, Italy, Norway and Switzerland, as well as on the Eurochart Hot 100, peaking at number 19 in August 1998. In Iceland and the Netherlands, "Life Is a Flower" entered the top 30. Outside Europe, it was a hit in New Zealand, where it peaked at number 29. It earned a gold record in the band's native Sweden, with shipments of 15,000 units, and a silver record in the UK, after 200,000 units were shipped there.

== Music video ==
Two music videos for "Life Is a Flower" were shot, but the first was unfinished and never released. The second video, which became the official release, was created by Jenny Berggren. The video includes members of Ace of Base against a green screen background with limited elements of scenography, including a washing machine and bathtub. The video was later made available on YouTube in 2015, and it has had more than 9.2 million views on the platform as of December 2023.

== Track listings ==
- Scandinavian maxi-CD single
1. "Life Is a Flower" (original version) — 3:45
2. "Life Is a Flower" (reggae version) — 3:32
3. "Life Is a Flower" (extended version) — 5:44
4. "Life Is a Flower" (Soul Poets night club mix) — 5:19
5. "No Good Lover" — 3:53
- European CD single
1. "Life Is a Flower" (original version) — 3:45
2. "Life Is a Flower" (extended version) — 5:49
- UK CD1
1. "Life Is a Flower" (original version)
2. "Life Is a Flower" (extended version)
3. "Life Is a Flower" (Soul Poets' night club mix)
4. "Life Is a Flower" (Milk Inc. long edit)
- UK CD2
1. "Life Is a Flower"
2. "The Sign" (radio edit)
3. "All That She Wants"

== Charts ==
=== Weekly charts ===
Weekly chart performance for "Life Is a Flower"
Chart (1998)	Peak position
Austria (Ö3 Austria Top 40)	15
Belgium (Ultratop 50 Flanders)	42
Croatia (HRT)	3
Denmark (IFPI)	3
Europe (Eurochart Hot 100)	19
Finland (Suomen virallinen lista)	3
France (SNEP)	16
Germany (GfK)	20
Hungary (Mahasz)	1
Iceland (Íslenski Listinn Topp 40)	22
Ireland (IRMA)	19
Italy (Musica e dischi)	18
Italy Airplay (Music & Media)	2
Netherlands (Dutch Top 40)	25
Netherlands (Single Top 100)	40
New Zealand (Recorded Music NZ)	29
Norway (VG-lista)	20
Scotland Singles (Official Charts)	3
Spain (AFYVE)	7
Sweden (Sverigetopplistan)	5
Switzerland (Schweizer Hitparade)	18
UK Singles (Official Charts)	5
UK Airplay (Media Monitor)	3

=== Year-end charts ===
Year-end chart performance for "Life Is a Flower"
Chart (1998)	Position
Europe (Eurochart Hot 100)	88
Europe Border Breakers (Music & Media)	2
Sweden (Hitlistan)	63
UK Singles (OCC)	61

== Sales and certifications ==
Certifications and sales for "Life Is a Flower"
Region	Certification	Certified units/sales
Sweden (GLF)	Gold	15,000^{^}
United Kingdom (BPI)	Silver	200,000^{^}
^{^} Shipments figures based on certification alone.

== Release history ==
Release dates and formats for "Life Is a Flower"
Region	Date	Format(s)	Label(s)	Ref.
Europe	23 March 1998	Radio	Mega; Polydor	
Germany	6 April 1998	CD	Mega; Polydor	
United Kingdom	13 July 1998	CD; cassette	Mega; Polydor; London	
Japan	21 August 1998	CD	Arista; BMG	
