= Jonas Berggren =

Swedish musician and producer (born 1967)

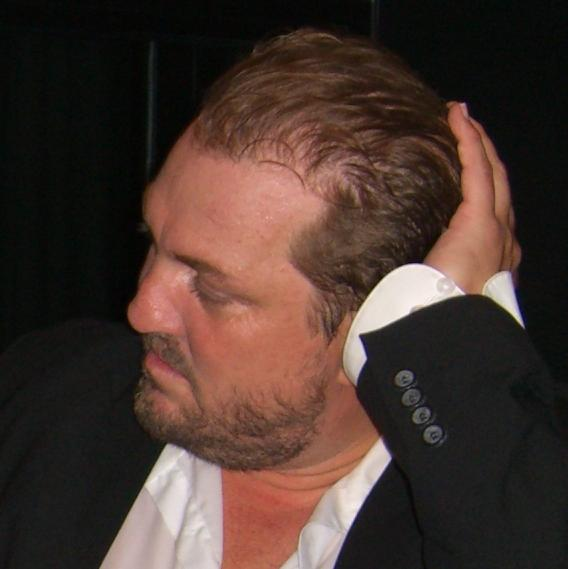
- Jonas Berggren in 2008

Background information
- Also known as: Joker
- Born: Jonas Petter Berggren; 21 March 1967 (age 59); Gothenburg, Sweden
- Genres: Pop
- Occupations: Musician; singer-songwriter; producer
- Instruments: Vocals; guitar; keyboards
- Years active: 1987–present
- Member of: Ace of Base
- Spouses: Birthe Haugland (m. 2000, divorced) Rosa Patriksson (m. 2024)

Jonas Petter Berggren (born 21 March 1967) is a Swedish musician, singer-songwriter, and record producer, also known as Joker. He started writing songs when he was seven and continues to write for the band Ace of Base, a group he formed with his two sisters Linn and Jenny. Berggren has written most of their hit songs including "All That She Wants", "The Sign", and "Beautiful Life". As well as singing, he also plays the guitar and keyboards.

He has also worked with DJ Bobo, Army of Lovers, E-Type, and Meja and has his own recording studio, The Barn.

== Personal life ==
Berggren was born in Gothenburg. His father, Göran was a doctor and his mother, Birgitta was a teacher. Jonas was named after his great-great grandfather, who was a corporal. He is the older brother to Linn and Jenny Berggren, who he formed Ace of Base with. He was born with a cleft palate, for which he was picked on at school. According to his mother, he had three operations by the time he was one and growing up "couldn't suck milk, and had to be fed". He became interested in music when he was 10, after his father started teaching him to play the guitar.

He studied economics and sociology at college. Before becoming a musician, he worked in a liquor store and an oil rig, and was called up for Sweden's mandatory military service. Berggren is six feet three inches tall. His hobbies include sports, politics, civics and geography.

Berggren met his first wife, Norwegian hairdresser Birthe Haugland, during a cruise in Norway in the summer of 1996, and they were married on 12 July 2000. Together they have four children. Berggren met his second and current wife, Rosa Patriksson in February 2023. He later proposed to her in Lysekil and they got married in 2024.
