= List of number-one albums from the 2000s (Denmark) =

The Danish Albums Chart is a list of albums ranked by physical and digital sales in Denmark. It is compiled by Nielsen Music Control in association with the Danish branch of the International Federation of the Phonographic Industry (IFPI), and the new number-one album is announced every Thursday at midnight on the official Danish music charts website.

”Tracklisten” official chart for singles started on Week 43 / 2007 dated November 2, 2007, when it replaced the "Hitlisten" Single Top-20 and Download Top 20.

However, the "Tracklisten" was updated back to week 1, 2007 according to statistics kept, so for this period of 10 months (January to October 2007), we have two #1 singles listings: The Official "Hitlisten" charts" and the estimated Tracklisten with different #1 listed.

== 2000 ==
Date	Artist	Album
1 January 2000	Cher	The Greatest Hits
8 January 2000	Cher	The Greatest Hits
15 January 2000	Björn Afzelius	Definitivt
22 January 2000	Björn Afzelius	Definitivt
29 January 2000	Björn Afzelius	Definitivt
5 February 2000	Flemming Bamse Jørgensen	Stand By Me
12 February 2000	Roy Orbison	The Danish Collection - The Very Best of Roy Orbison
19 February 2000	Roy Orbison	The Danish Collection - The Very Best of Roy Orbison
26 February 2000	Roy Orbison	The Danish Collection - The Very Best of Roy Orbison
4 March 2000	Aqua	Aquarius
11 March 2000	Aqua	Aquarius
18 March 2000	Aqua	Aquarius
25 March 2000	Aqua	Aquarius
1 April 2000	Aqua	Aquarius
8 April 2000	Aqua	Aquarius
15 April 2000	Macy Gray	On How Life Is
22 April 2000	D-A-D	Everything Glows
29 April 2000	Aqua	Aquarius
6 May 2000	Aqua	Aquarius
13 May 2000	James Last	The Very Best Of
20 May 2000	Brødrene Olsen	Wings of Love
27 May 2000	Brødrene Olsen	Wings of Love
3 June 2000	Brødrene Olsen	Wings of Love
10 June 2000	Brødrene Olsen	Wings of Love
17 June 2000	Brødrene Olsen	Wings of Love
24 June 2000	Brødrene Olsen	Wings of Love
1 July 2000	Brødrene Olsen	Wings of Love
8 July 2000	Brødrene Olsen	Wings of Love
15 July 2000	Brødrene Olsen	Wings of Love
22 July 2000	Brødrene Olsen	Wings of Love
29 July 2000	Brødrene Olsen	Wings of Love
5 August 2000	Brødrene Olsen	Wings of Love
12 August 2000	Brødrene Olsen	Wings of Love
19 August 2000	Brødrene Olsen	Wings of Love
26 August 2000	Brødrene Olsen	Wings of Love
2 September 2000	Ronan Keating	Ronan
9 September 2000	Craig David	Born to Do It
16 September 2000	Craig David	Born to Do It
23 September 2000	Madonna	Music
30 September 2000	Madonna	Music
7 October 2000	Madonna	Music
14 October 2000	Madonna	Music
21 October 2000	Shu-bi-dua	Shu-bi-dua 17
28 October 2000	Lis Sørensen	Rose
4 November 2000	U2	All That You Can't Leave Behind
11 November 2000	U2	All That You Can't Leave Behind
18 November 2000	Rollo & King	Midt i en løbetid
25 November 2000	The Beatles	1
2 December 2000	The Beatles	1
9 December 2000	The Beatles	1
16 December 2000	The Beatles	1
23 December 2000	The Beatles	1
30 December 2000	The Beatles	1

== 2001 ==
Artist	Album	Reached number 1	Weeks
Eminem	The Marshall Mathers LP	5 January 2001	4
TV-2	Amerika	9 February 2001	3
Diverse	Dansk Melodi Grandprix 2001	2 March 2001	1
Lars Lilholt Band	Gloria	9 March 2001	1
Erann DD	Still Believing	16 March 2001	1
Lars Lilholt Band	Gloria	23 March 2001	3
Sort Sol	Snakecharmer	13 April 2001	1
Elvis Presley	ELV1S	20 April 2001	1
Diverse	M:G:P 2001	27 April 2001	3
Diverse	Eurovision Song Contest - Copenhagen 2001	18 May 2001	2
Creed	Human Clay	1 June 2001	1
Safri Duo	Episode II	8 June 2001	9
Soundtrack	Bridget Jones's Diary	10 August 2001	4
Björk	Vespertine	7 September 2001	1
Soundtrack	Bridget Jones's Diary	14 September 2001	1
Bob Dylan	Love and Theft	21 September 2001	1
Macy Gray	The Id	28 September 2001	1
Cowgirls	Girls Night Out	5 October 2001	1
Bamse	Always On My Mind	12 October 2001	1
Leonard Cohen	Ten New Songs	19 October 2001	1
Bamse	Always On My Mind	26 October 2001	1
Thomas Helmig	Isityouisitme	2 November 2001	1
Michael Jackson	Invincible	9 November 2001	1
Christian	Du kan gøre hvad du vil	16 January 2001	1
Eye Q	Let It Spin	23 November 2001	2
Kim Larsen	Sange fra glemmebogen	7 December 2001	5

== 2002 ==
Artist	Album	Reached number 1	Weeks
Anstacia	Freak of Nature	11 January 2002	1
Kim Larsen	Sange fra glemmebogen	18 January 2002	1
Anstacia	Freak of Nature	25 January 2002	1
Saybia	The Second You Sleep	1 February 2002	4
D-A-D	Soft Dogs	1 March 2002	1
James Sampson	James	8 March 2002	1
På Slaget 12	Let's Dance	15 March 2002	3
Diverse	M:G:P 2002	5 April 2002	7
Moby	18	24 May 2002	1
Razz	Kickflipper	31 May 2002	1
C.V. Jørgensen	Fraklip fra det fjerne	7 June 2002	2
Razz	Kickflipper	14 June 2002	1
David Bowie	Heathen	21 June 2002	1
Razz	Kickflipper	28 June 2002	3
Red Hot Chili Peppers	By the Way	19 July 2002	3
Bruce Springsteen	The Rising	9 August 2002	1
Brødrene Olsen	Songs	16 August 2002	2
Poul Krebs	Striber af lys	30 August 2002	1
Coldplay	A Rush of Blood to the Head	6 September 2002	1
Brødrene Olsen	Songs	13 September 2002	1
Outlandish	Bread & Barrels Of Water	20 September 2002	2
Elvis Presley	ELV1S	4 October 2002	2
Sort Sol	Circle Hits the Flame – Best Off...	18 October 2002	1
Celine Dion	A New Day Has Come	25 October 2002	1
Norah Jones	Come Away With Me	1 November 2002	1
Hanne Boel	Beware Of The Dog	8 November 2002	1
U2	The Best of 1990–2000	15 November 2002	2
Jon	This Side Up	29 November 2002	4
Robbie Williams	Escapology	27 December 2002	3

== 2003 ==
Artist	Album	Reached number 1	Weeks
Soundtrack	Music from and Inspired by the Motion Picture 8 Mile	17 January 2003	2
Robbie Williams	Escapology	31 January 2003	1
Soundtrack	Music from and Inspired by the Motion Picture 8 Mile	7 February 2003	1
Nick Cave and The Bad Seeds	Nocturama	14 February 2003	1
Carpark North	Carpark North	21 February 2003	1
Julie	Home	28 February 2003	2
Kashmir	Zitilites	14 March 2003	1
Lars Lilholt	Nefertiti	21 March 2003	1
Norah Jones	Come Away With Me	28 March 2003	1
Celine Dion	One Heart	4 April 2003	2
Shu-bi-dua	200	18 April 2003	4
Diverse	M:G:P 2003	16 May 2003	4
Metallica	St. Anger	13 June 2003	3
På Slaget 12	Let's Dance 3	4 July 2003	3
Evanescence	Fallen	25 July 2003	1
Robbie Williams	Escapology	1 August 2003	2
Big Fat Snake	One Night Of Sin	15 August 2003	4
Tim Christensen	Honeyburst	12 September 2003	2
David Bowie	Reality	26 September 2003	1
Sting	Sacred Love	3 October 2003	1
Dido	Life for Rent	10 October 2003	1
Robbie Williams	Live at Knebworth	17 October 2003	2
Erann DD	That's The Way For Me	31 October 2003	1
R.E.M.	In Time: The Best of R.E.M. 1988–2003	7 November 2003	2
Kim Larsen and Kjukken	7-9-13	21 November 2003	7

== 2004 ==
Artist	Album	Reached number 1	Weeks
Gasolin'	The Black Box	9 January 2004	1
Kim Larsen and Kjukken	7-9-13	16 January 2004	1
Gasolin'	The Black Box	23 January 2004	1
Kim Larsen and Kjukken	7-9-13	30 January 2004	3
Norah Jones	Feels Like Home	20 February 2004	3
Swan Lee	Swan Lee	12 March 2004	2
George Michael	Patience	26 March 2004	2
Anastacia	Anastacia	9 April 2004	3
Thomas Helmig	El camino	30 April 2004	5
Runrig	30 Year Journey - The Best	4 June 2004	1
Vikingarna	Bästa kramgoa låtarna	11 June 2004	3
Diverse	På Danske Læber - Leonard Cohen Tribute	2 July 2004	1
Nephew	USA DSB	9 July 2004	4
Shakin' Stevens	Collectable	6 August 2004	2
Big Fat Snake	More Fire	20 August 2004	5
Saybia	These Are the Days	24 September 2004	1
Allan Olsen	Gæst	1 October 2004	1
Diverse	M:G:P 2004	8 October 2005	3
Drengene Fra Angora	Drengene Fra Angora	29 October 2004	1
Leonard Cohen	Dear Heather	28 October 2005	1
John Mogensen	Samlede værker	12 November 2004	1
Kim Larsen and Kjukken	Glemmebogen Jul & Nytår	19 November 2004	2
U2	How To Dismantle An Atomic Bomb	3 December 2004	1
Kim Larsen and Kjukken	Glemmebogen Jul & Nytår	10 December 2004	3

== 2005 ==
Artist	Album	Reached number 1	Weeks
Nik & Jay	2	7 January 2005	1
Katie Melua	Call Off The Search	14 January 2005	2
Nephew	USA DSB	28 January 2005	3
Bikstok Røgsystem	Over stok og sten	18 February 2005	1
Diverse	Dansk Melodi Grandprix 2005	25 February 2005	1
Sanne Salomonsen	The Album	4 March 2005	1
Lars Lilholt Band	De lyse nætters orkester	11 March 2005	2
Hush	A Lifetime	25 March 2005	1
Lars Lilholt Band	De lyse nætters orkester	1 April 2005	2
Jacob Andersen	Make It Better	15 April 2005	1
Simone	Vindens farver	22 April 2005	2
Bruce Springsteen	Devils & Dust	6 May 2005	1
Simone	Vindens farver	13 May 2005	3
D-A-D	Scare Yourself	3 June 2005	1
The Four Jacks	Samlede Udgivelser 1957-1963	10 June 2005	1
Coldplay	X&Y	17 June 2005	1
The Four Jacks	Samlede Udgivelser 1957-1963	24 June 2005	1
Coldplay	X&Y	1 July 2005	5
Tina Dico	In the Red	5 August 2005	1
U2	How To Dismantle An Atomic Bomb	12 August 2005	1
Tue West	Meldingen kommer	19 August 2005	1
James Blunt	Back To Bedlam	26 August 2005	3
The Rolling Stones	A Bigger Bang	16 September 2005	1
L.O.C.	Cassiopeia	23 September 2005	1
Diverse	M:G:P 2005	30 September 2005	3
Kashmir	No Balance Palace	21 October 2005	1
Depeche Mode	Playing The Angel	28 October 2005	1
Robbie Williams	Intensive Care	4 November 2005	2
TV-2	De første kærester på månen	18 November 2005	1
Madonna	Confessions On A Dance Floor	25 November 2005	1
TV-2	De første kærester på månen	2 December 2005	5

== 2006 ==
Artist	Album	Reached number 1	Weeks
Eminem	Curtain Call: The Hits	6 January 2006	1
Katie Melua	Piece by Piece	13 January 2006	3
TV-2	De første kærester på månen	3 February 2006	1
Big Fat Snake	Between The Devil And The Big Blue Sea	10 February 2006	4
Danser Med Drenge	Vores bedste	10 March 2006	8
Mark Knopfler and Emmylou Harris	All the Roadrunning	5 May 2006	1
Thomas Koppel	Improvisationer For Klaver	12 May 2006	1
Red Hot Chili Peppers	Stadium Arcadium	19 May 2006	3
Shakira	Oral Fixation, Vol. 2	9 June 2006	3
Crazy Frog	Crazy Frog Presents More Crazy Hits	30 June 2006	1
Shakira	Oral Fixation, Vol. 2	7 July 2006	2
Bruce Springsteen	We Shall Overcome: The Seeger Sessions	21 July 2006	1
Johnny Deluxe	Luxus	28 July 2006	2
Bruce Springsteen	We Shall Overcome: The Seeger Sessions	4 August 2006	2
Niarn	Antihelt	18 August 2006	1
Gavin DeGraw	Chariot	25 August 2006	1
Madonna	Confessions On A Dance Floor	1 September 2006	1
Bob Dylan	Modern Times	8 September 2006	1
Poul Krebs	Ku den næste dans blive min?	15 September 2006	1
Bob Dylan	Modern Times	22 September 2006	1
Diverse	M:G:P 2006	29 September 2006	2
Interkom Kom Ind	Nephew	13 October 2007	3
Robbie Williams	Rudebox	3 November 2007	1
Diverse	Danske Filmhits - De største stjerner	10 November 2007	1
Thomas Helmig	Helmig herfra	17 November 2007	1
Kim Larsen	Gammel hankat	24 November 2006	6

== 2007 ==
Artist	Album	Reached number 1	Weeks
Thomas Helmig	Helmig herfra	5 January 2007	4
Julie	Asasara	2 February 2007	1
Norah Jones	Not Too Late	9 February 2007	2
Diverse	Dansk Melodi Grandprix 2007	23 February 2007	1
Volbeat	Rock the Rebel/Metal the Devil	2 March 2007	1
Fede Finn & Funny Boyz	De fedeste	9 March 2007	7
Amy Winehouse	Back To Black	27 April 2007	1
Arctic Monkeys	Favourite Worst Nightmare	4 May 2007	1
Elton John	Rocket Man: The Definitive Hits	11 May 2007	1
Björk	Volta	18 May 2007	1
Runrig	Everything You See	25 May 2007	3
Allan Olsen	Multo Importanto	15 June 2007	1
Runrig	Everything You See	22 June 2007	1
Traveling Wilburys	The Traveling Wilburys Collection	29 June 2007	2
Infernal	From Paris to Berlin	13 July 2007	1
Bon Jovi	Lost Highway	20 July 2007	2
Traveling Wilburys	The Traveling Wilburys Collection	3 August 2007	1
Beth Hart	37 Days	10 August 2007	2
Paul Potts	One Chance	24 August 2007	3
Tina Dickow	Count to Ten	14 September 2007	1
Paul Potts	One Chance	21 September 2007	1
Diverse	M:G:P 2007	28 September 2007	2
Bruce Springsteen	Magic	12 October 2007	1
Diverse	M:G:P 2007	9 October 2007	2
Anne Linnet	Akvarium	2 November 2007	1
Kim Larsen	En lille pose støj	9 November 2007	3
TV-2	For dig ku jeg gøre alting	30 November 2007	1
Kim Larsen	En lille pose støj	7 December 2007	5

== 2008 ==
Artist	Album	Reached number 1	Weeks
Natasja	I Danmark er jeg født	11 January 2008	3
Spleen United	Neanderthal	1 February 2008	1
Kandis	Kandis 12	8 February 2008	2
Lars Lilholt Band	Smukkere med tiden	22 February 2008	3
Danser med Drenge	Sådan er det bare	14 March 2008	2
L.O.C.	Melankolia/XXXCouture	28 March 2008	2
R.E.M.	Accelerate	11 April 2008	1
L.O.C.	Melankolia/XXXCouture	18 April 2008	1
Amy Macdonald	This Is the Life	25 April 2008	2
Madonna	Hard Candy	9 May 2008	4
Martin	Show the World	6 June 2008	3
Coldplay	Viva la Vida or Death and All His Friends	27 June 2008	2
Creedence Clearwater Revival	Best of Cleerance Clearwater Revival	11 July 2008	3
Soundtrack	Mamma Mia! The Movie Soundtrack	1 August 2008	6
Volbeat	Guitar Gangsters & Cadillac Blood	12 September 2008	1
Metallica	Death Magnetic	19 September 2008	2
Diverse	M:G:P 2008: Det er bare noget vi leger	3 October 2008	3
Kim Larsen	Glemmebogen for børn	24 October 2008	1
AC/DC	Black Ice	31 October 2008	3
D-A-D	Monster Philiosophy	21 November 2008	1
Nik & Jay	De største	28 November 2008	3
Sys Bjerre	Gør det selv	19 December 2008	2

== 2009 ==
Artist	Album	Reached number 1	Weeks
Nik & Jay	De største	3 January 2009	2
Josh Groban	A Collection	17 January 2009	1
Duffy	Rockferry	24 January 2009	2
Bruce Springsteen	Working on a Dream	6 February 2009	1
Diverse	Dansk Melodi Grandprix 2009	13 February 2009	1
Bruce Springsteen	Working on a Dream	20 February 2009	2
Kandis	Kandis Live 2 - 20 års jub	5 March 2009	1
U2	No Line on the Horizon	12 March 2009	1
Sanne Salomonsen	Unico	19 March 2009	6
Depeche Mode	Sounds of the Universe	1 May 2009	1
Bob Dylan	Together Through Life	8 May 2009	1
Sanne Salomonsen	Unico	15 May 2009	1
Green Day	21st Century Breakdown	22 May 2009	1
Eminem	Relapse	29 May 2009	2
Nephew	Danmark/Denmark	12 June 2009	2
Aqua	Greatest Hits	26 June 2009	2
Michael Jackson	The Collection	10 July 2009	6
Aqua	Greatest Hits	21 August 2009	1
Mew	No More Stories Are Told	28 August 2009	2
Big Fat Snake	What Is Left Is Right	11 September 2009	2
Muse	The Resistance	25 September 2009	1
Madonna	Celebration	2 October 2009	1
Diverse	M:G:P 2009	9 October 2009	2
Rammstein	Liebe Ist Für Alle Da	23 October 2009	2
Rasmus Seebach	Rasmus Seebach	30 October 2009	2
Thomas Helmig	Tommy Boy	13 November 2009	1
Tyve Ti	Dalton	20 November 2009	2
Selvmord	Selvmord	27 November 2009	1
Tyve Ti	Dalton	4 December 2009	1
Rasmus Seebach	Rasmus Seebach	11 December 2009	9

== See also ==
- List of number-one albums from the 2010s (Denmark)
