= The Overmuch Box =

Box set by D-A-D
- Released: 16 November 2009
- Genre: Cowpunk, Hard rock

D-A-D chronology
Monster Philosophy (2008)	The Overmuch Box (2009)	Behind the Seen (2009)

The Overmuch Box celebrates the 25 years of the Danish rock band D-A-D and was released on 16 November 2009. It is a release of their complete studio works up to 2009, containing 10 remastered studio albums plus rarities. However, the set does not include the band's live material.

== Remastered albums ==
- Call of the Wild (1985)
- D.A.D. Draws a Circle (1987)
- No Fuel Left for the Pilgrims (1989)
- Riskin' It All (1991)
- Helpyourselfish (1995)
- Simpatico (1997)
- Everything Glows (2000)
- Soft Dogs (2002)
- Scare Yourself (2005)
- Monster Philosophy (2008)

== Rarities ==
- Standin' On The Never Never (1985) - remastered and for the first time to be released on a CD.
- Behind The Seen (2009) - bonus album: including 8 previously unreleased tracks, plus 10 rare b-sides and bonus tracks.
- A biography (in English) about the life and times of D.A.D, based on a number of recent interviews with the band, by author Michael Valeur. The 160 pages are illustrated by D.A.D. bass player Stig Pedersen.
