= Bonderøven =

Danish TV show

Bonderøven (can loosely be translated to "The Hill-billy") is a Danish TV show produced by DR and broadcast on DR1. The program was originally broadcast on the channel DR2 but in 2011 it was moved to the main channel DR1 since it had a great success.

Kastaniegården, Djursland is the location for the programs, where we follow Frank Erichsen pursuing his dream of becoming self-sufficient. Frank is living the dream of a simpler life with his wife Theresa and their children Alma and Johan. This means that everything is done the old-fashioned way with tools he can repair himself if they break, and with machines powered by a horse.

So far, 22 seasons have been made. There have been two seasons each year, except in the beginning. Normally one season starts in January, February, or March, and one season starts in August, September, or October. The later seasons have had 10 episodes, one per week.

== The farm ==
When Frank bought the farm, it was a discontinued farm, that he now has started again. At that time the farm was called Kejsergården (Emperor Farm), but Frank and Theresa thought this was too portentous and renamed it Kastaniegården (Chestnut Farm), since a big chestnut tree was growing in the small farmyard.

The farm consists of several buildings. When they took over the farm, Erichsen lived in the original farmhouse with timber framing and thatched roof, but it was in bad condition. The former pig house was converted to a farmhouse, and the family lived there. The original farmhouse was demolished and Erichsen has built a new one. The other buildings on the farm have also been renovated. One building now has a workshop in one end, while the rest of the building is still stable. Another stable is partly demolished and rebuilt. In a hay barrack there is room for horses.

Frank has built a large Victorian greenhouse at the end of the new farmhouse.

== Animals on the farm ==
Kastanjegården has been home for many animals, and some animals have been replaced in the course of time.

- Horses: Before Frank bought the farm, he bought two horses: Bellis and Mammut for working on the fields. Bellis never grew as big as Frank hoped, and Mammut was not useful as a draft animal. So they were sold, and Frank bought a new horse called Solveig, that was already trained to be a draft horse. Solveig has gotten two foals, the last of them still on the farm together with Solveig. The horses live in the hay barrack.
- Dog: Frank had a dog called Malik, a Siberian Husky. His dream was to go to Alaska and hunt in the great forests. Malik was also nicknamed "the guide dog", because he always sat at the steering wheel when he was alone in the cab in Frank's old Toyota Land Cruiser HJ45.
- Cows: The Jersey cow Maren was the first cow on Kastanjegården. It was yielding too much milk for the small farm and was replaced by one Jutland cow, which is more suitable for grazing. Frank has decided that he wants to milk his Jutland cow, even though it has been many years since anyone has attempted milking this breed.
- Goats: The goats were acquired to provide both milk and meat, but they were replaced by sheep when the cows arrived on the farm. The goat herd consisted of an old goat, Anton, and some females used as dairy goats. In addition, every year a lot of kids came, who were slaughtered when they were big enough. The only goat that stood out from the herd was Lillen. This was a small billy goat whose mother died when he was very small, as did his foster mother. So Frank's girlfriend, Theresa, has preserved it after it became the farm's pet goat. The goats lived in the barn next to the workshop when they were not outdoors.
- Geese: There are also geese on the farm. During the year, they are moved around on the green areas of the farm and function in that way as efficient lawnmowers. Most are slaughtered for Christmas. The remaining ones lay eggs to form next year's herd.
- Chickens: Of course there are also chickens on the farm laying eggs. If there are too many, such as rooster chicks, they are slaughtered. The chickens live in a half-timbered house behind the old farmhouse.
- Pigs: There have been pigs more than once on the farm, but Frank thinks they are too demanding for food, to fit in the farm. So they have never become a permanent part of the herd.
- Bees: Originally, Frank wanted to keep bees like they do in France, in hollowed-out tree trunks, but that project was replaced by two common hives that give a good yield of honey.
- Cats: The farm has several cats, which catch mice and rodents.

== About the show ==
Bonderøven was broadcast for the first time on 23 March 2008. Each episode is about 30 minutes long. It varies how many episodes each season has. The first season was released on DVD 30 June 2009.

Each season is shown with a year's delay. That means the episode shown at Christmas 2011 was recorded at Christmas 2010.

On average the team uses five days to record an episode.

Each episode is edited, so it contains some craftmanship, something about growing, and something about the animals on the farm.

== Crew ==
- Frank Ladegaard Erichsen (host)
- Peter Wath (camera and producer)
- Mogens Fink Elbæk (producer, editing, and music)
- Nanna Ernst (designer)
- Carsten Ortmann (speak) - seasons 1 and 2
- Rikke Lauridsen/Hedman (former producer)

== Awards ==
In 2010 the program won the award "Best public service format" at the Eurovision Forum in Switzerland. Erichsen and the rest of the team were unaware about the nomination, until they were told that they won.

In 2011 Bonderøven was nominated for the prize "Årets TV-program" (TV-program of the year) at the Billed Bladet awardshow TV-GULD. However, the prize went to Borgen. In 2012 the program was also nominated for the same prize, and this time Erichsen was nominated for "Årets mandlige TV-vært" (male TV host of the year). Vild med dans won the first mentioned prize, and Mikkel Beha Erichsen won the other one.

In 2014 the programme was nominated for the same prize, and it won. The award is given based on votes from readers of the magazine. Bonderøven was nominated again in 2015, but was beaten by Badehotellet from TV 2.

== Music ==
The theme song of the show is "Lørdag Formiddag: by Magtens Korridorer.

Other music used in the episodes:

Artist	Song
Allan Olsen	Aston Martin 66
America	"A Horse with No Name"
Anastacia	-
Aske Bentzon	"Badminton"
Baby Woodrose	-
Balstyrko	"Ravn"
Beastie Boys	"Intergalactic"
Beck	"Where It's At" "Gamma Ray"
Blind Faith	"Can't Find My Way Home"
The Blue Van	"Man Up"
Bo Kaspers Orkester	"Ett & Noll"
Bonnie Raitt	"Nick of Time"
Booker T. & the M.G.'s	"Green Onions"
Bryan Adams	"Run To You"
Børge Roger-Henrichsen	-
Carpark North	"Beasts"
Chris Rea	"Driving Home For Christmas"
Cirkus Arenas Husorkester	-
Coldplay	"Talk" "Trouble" "Yellow"
Colorblind	"Living Together"
The Cure	"Friday I'm in Love"
C.V. Jørgensen	"Amor og den sidste pil"
D-A-D	"Sleeping My Day Away"
Dire Straits	"Six blade knife"
David Kitt	-
Deep Purple	"Child in Time"
Doobie Brothers	-
Duffy	"Mercy"
The Eagles	"Hotel California"
Eric Clapton	"Circus"
Figurines	-
Fleetwood Mac	"Never Going Back Again" "You Make Loving Fun"
Green Day	"American Idiot"
Jack Johnson	"Belle" "Better Together" "Constellations" "Staple it Together "Talk of the Town" "You And Your Heart"
James Taylor	-
Jens Unmack	"Skovens dybe Stille"
JJ Cale	-
John Mayall	"Room To Move"
John Mayer	"Crossroads" "Love Is A Verb" "Something like Olivia" "Queen of California" "Who Says" "Paper Doll"
Johnny Madsen	"Sorte måne"
Kaiser Chiefs	"Ruby"
Kim Larsen	"Elefantens Vuggevise"
Kings of Leon	"Sex on Fire"
Kira & The Kindred Spirits	-
Lalo Schifrin	-
Lenny Kravitz	-
Leslie West Band	-
Lloyd Cole and the Commotions	-
Lucinda Williams	-
Marie Frank	"Symptom of My Time"
The Meters	-
Miike Snow	-
Mogwai	-
Natural Born Hippies	"Am I Not Sweet"
Nancy Sinatra	"These Boots Are Made for Walkin'"
Nina Forsberg	"Hallelujah Time"
Norman Greenbaum	"Spirit in the sky"
Queen	"Bohemian Rhapsody"
Patti Scialfa	-
Patty Griffin	-
Peter Sommer	"8-6-6-0"
The Police	-
The Presidents of the United States of America	"Peaches"
The Pretenders	"Don't Get Me Wrong"
Rammstein	"Du Hast"
Red Hot Chili Peppers	"Californication"
Rickie Lee Jones	"Chuck E.'s In Love"
Robert Plant	-
The Rolling Stones	"Wild Horses"
Roxette	"Wish I Could Fly"
The Sandmen	"House In The Country"
The Script	"Breakeven"
Sebastian	"Her er en sang" "Når lyset bryder frem" "Sommerfuglen"
Sorten Muld	"Bonden og Elverpigen"
Southern Gothic Tales	"Slip Me a Pill
Steely Dan	"Do It Again" "Jack of Speed"
Stevie Wonder	"Pastime Paradise"
Superheroes	"You just don't turn me on" (special acoustic version)
Sylvester Larsen	-
Tim Christensen	"India" "As I let You In" "Two Is A Crowd"
Tina Dickow	"Glow"
Thomas Helmig	"You can't feel" "Elcamino"
Tom Petty and the Heartbreakers	"Wildflowers" "Breakdown"
Tom Waits	"Christmas Card from a Hooker in Minneapolis"
Troelsen & Varano	-
Vampire Weekend	-
Van Morrison	"Stranded"
Volbeat	"Light A Way"
White Lies	"Farewell to the Fairground"
The XX	"Crystalised"
Yes	"Owner of a Lonely Heart"
Yppah	"Gumball Machine Weekend"
-	Mission Impossible theme

== Bibliography ==
- Bonderøven fra Norddjurs
