= D.A.D. Special =

Compilation album by D-A-D
- Released: 1 December 1989
- Recorded: 1985–1986
- Genre: Cowpunk; hard rock
- Label: Mega
- Producer: Frank Marstokk; Mark Dearnley

D-A-D chronology
No Fuel Left for the Pilgrims (1989)	D.A.D. Special (1989)	Osaka After Dark (1990)

D.A.D. Special is a compilation album by the Danish rock group D-A-D. The compilation was released on 1 December 1989 in Sweden, Norway, Denmark and Finland only.
It contains tracks from the group's two first albums, Call of the Wild and D.A.D. Draws a Circle, and also form their debut EP Standin' on the Never Never.

== Track listing ==
All tracks are written by D-A-D.

No.	Title	Original release	Length
1.	"Isn't That Wild"	D.A.D. Draws a Circle, 1987	2:52
2.	"Marlboro Man"	Call of the Wild, 1986	2:53
3.	"I Won't Cut My Hair"	D.A.D. Draws a Circle	5:52
4.	"Trucker"	Call of the Wild	5:09
5.	"Jonnie"	Call of the Wild	4:58
6.	"It's After Dark"	Call of the Wild	3:50
7.	"Call of the Wild"	Call of the Wild	3:42
8.	"Mighty Mighty High"	D.A.D. Draws a Circle	3:18
9.	"Counting the Cattle"	Call of the Wild	1:55
10.	"God's Favorite"	D.A.D. Draws a Circle	3:55
11.	"Black Crickets"	D.A.D. Draws a Circle	4:12
12.	"Sad Sad Christmas"	B-side to "It's After Dark", 1986	3:26
13.	"Never Never (Indian Love)"	Standin' on the Never Never, 1985	5:10
14.	"Up, Up Over the Mountain Top"	Standin' on the Never Never	2:19

== Personnel ==
Adapted from the original albums' liner notes.

D-A-D

- Jesper Binzer – vocals, guitar, banjo
- Stig Pedersen – vocals, bass
- Jacob Binzer – guitar, lap steel, electric piano, keyboards, backing vocals
- Peter L. Jensen – drums, percussion, backing vocals

Technical

- Frank Marstokk – producer (tracks 2, 4, 5, 7, 9, 12, 13, 14)
- Mark Dearnley – producer (tracks 1, 3, 8, 10, 11)
- Carsten Beck – cover design
- D-A-D – cover design
