= The Early Years (D-A-D album) =

Compilation album by D-A-D
- Released: 13 November 2000
- Genre: Cowpunk, Hard rock
- Label: Medley Records

D-A-D chronology
Everything Glows (2000)	The Early Years (2000)	Soft Dogs (2002)

Professional ratings
Review scores
Source	Rating
AllMusic	3/5 stars

The Early Years is the third compilation album by the Danish rock group D-A-D. The compilation was released on 13 November 2000.
It contains every track from the group's first two albums Call of the Wild and D.A.D. Draws a Circle, their first EP Standin' On the Never Never plus extra material consisting of remixes and radio edits among other things. It peaked at number 40 on the Danish charts on 19 January 2001.

== Track listing ==
=== CD 1 ===
Call Of The Wild

1. Land Of Their Choice
2. Call Of The Wild
3. Riding With Sue
4. Marlboro Man
5. Counting The Cattle
6. Jackie O
7. Trucker
8. Rock River
9. Jonnie
10. Son Of A Gun
11. It's After Dark

D.A.D. Draws A Circle

12. Isn't That Wild
13. A Horse With No Name
14. Mighty Highty High
15. I Won't Cut My Hair
16. Black Crickets
17. There's A Ship
18. God's Favorite
19. 10 Knots
20. Ride My Train
21. Rather Live Than Die

=== CD 2 ===
Standin' On The Never Never

1. Up, Up Over The Mountain Top
2. Marlboro Man
3. Never Never (Indian Love)

Extra material

4. Ride My Train (2000 Remix)
5. It's After Dark (video version)
6. Trucker (2000 remix single version/radio edit)
7. Trucker (2000 remix club version)
8. Trucker (1987 New York remix)
9. Trucker (1987 jab dub)
10. There's A Ship (The 1987 megamix)
11. Rin Tin Tin (demo)
12. It's A Sad Sad X-mas (single version)
13. The Danish Radio 1987/88 New year's jingle 1: "The Party"
14. The Danish Radio 1987/88 New year's jingle 2: "From Us To You"
15. The Danish Radio 1987/88 New year's jingle 3: "Fireworks"
16. Land Of Their Choice (live 1985)
17. Radio Voice interview: "The Whopper End"
