= 1987 in Nordic music =

The following is a list of notable events and releases that happened in Nordic music in 1987.

== Events ==
- 10 April – Dag Arnesen's commissioned work, "Strøtanker og røde roser", is premièred at the Vossajazz festival in Norway.
- 9 May – At the 32nd Eurovision Song Contest, Denmark is the best-performing of the Scandinavian countries, finishing in 5th place. Norway finishes 9th, Sweden 12th, Finland 15th and Iceland 16th.
- November – Agnetha Fältskog releases a new solo album, produced by Peter Cetera in California.

== Classical works ==
- Per Nørgård – Violin Concerto No. 1 "Helle Nacht"
- Kaija Saariaho – Nymphéa, for string quartet and electronics

== Hit singles ==
- A-ha – "The Living Daylights" (#1 Norway; #2 Ireland; #3 Denmark, Finland, Sweden)
- Hot Eyes (as Kirsten & Soren) – "Farvel og tak"
- Tapani Kansa – "Hopeinen Kuu"
- På Slaget 12 – "Hjem til Århus" (#13 Denmark)
- Kasper Winding & Lars Muhl – "Sjæl I Flammer2 (#1 Denmark)

== Film and television music ==
- Stefan Nilsson – Pelle the Conqueror
- Per Nørgård – Babette's Feast

== Eurovision Song Contest ==
- Denmark in the Eurovision Song Contest 1987
- Finland in the Eurovision Song Contest 1987
- Iceland in the Eurovision Song Contest 1987
- Norway in the Eurovision Song Contest 1987
- Sweden in the Eurovision Song Contest 1987

== Births ==
- 29 October – Tove Lo, Swedish singer-songwriter

== Deaths ==
- 25 January – Øivind Bergh, Norwegian violinist and orchestral leader (born 1909)
- 18 March – Kari Diesen, Norwegian actor and singer (born 1914)
- 28 April – Åke Uddén, Swedish violist, conductor and composer (born 1903)
- 13 May – Signe Amundsen, Norwegian operatic soprano (born 1899)
- 9 September – Gunnar de Frumerie, Swedish pianist and composer (born 1908)
- 12 November – Cornelis Vreeswijk, Dutch-Swedish singer-songwriter, actor, and poet (born 1937)
- 13 November – Aage Samuelsen, Norwegian evangelist, singer and composer (born 1915)
- 2 December – Trygve Henrik Hoff, Norwegian singer, composer, songwriter, and writer (born 1938)
