= Risk It All =

Risk It All may refer to:

- "Risk It All" (Ella Henderson, House Gospel Choir and Just Kiddin song), 2021
- "Risk It All" (Bruno Mars song), 2026
- "Risk It All", a 2023 song by Usher and H.E.R. from the soundtrack The Color Purple
- "Risk It All", a song by the Vamps from the 2014 album Meet the Vamps
- "Risk It All", a 2022 song by Yuna
- "Risk It All", an episode of The Suite Life of Zack & Cody

== See also ==
- "Risk It", a 2016 song by Jessica Mauboy from The Secret Daughter: Songs from the Original TV Series
- Riskin' It All, a 1991 studio album by D-A-D
