= Osaka After Dark =

Live album by D-A-D
- Released: 25 October 1990
- Recorded: 23 January 1990 (Osaka MID Theater)
- Genres: Cowpunk, Hard rock
- Label: Warner Bros.

D-A-D chronology
D.A.D. Special (1989)	Osaka After Dark (1990)	Riskin' It All (1991)

Osaka After Dark is the first live album by the Danish rock group D-A-D. The album was released on 23 January 1990 in Japan only.
The recordings was made during the group's tour of Japan, Singapore and Australia in April 1989.

== Track listing ==
1. "Girl Nation"
2. "ZCMI"
3. "Rim Of Hell"
4. "Sleeping My Day Away"
5. "Lords Of The Atlas"
6. "Wild Talk"
7. "Overmuch"
