= Troen & Ingen =

2010 studio album by Søren Huss

Studio album by Søren Huss
- Released: 18 October 2010
- Studio: A Kind of Eden (Køge); Medley Studiet (Vesterbro, Copenhagen)
- Genre: Pop, rock
- Label: Universal Music Denmark
- Producer: Søren Huss; Christoffer Møller

Søren Huss chronology
Troen & Ingen (2010)	Oppefra & Ned (2012)

Singles from Troen & Ingen
- 1. "Et hav af udstrakte hænder" Released: 23 August 2010; 2. "Du er" Released: 2010; 3. "Fra tanke til..." Released: 2011

Troen & Ingen is the debut studio album by Danish singer and songwriter Søren Huss. It was released on 18 October 2010 through Universal Music Denmark.

== Background ==
"Troen & Ingen" is Huss's first solo studio album after three album releases with the rock band Saybia, and comes three years after his girlfriend died in a right-turning accident. It was recorded at A Kind of Eden and Medley Studiet. Huss has explained about the album, "The record is in many ways a quantum leap for me. Partly I sing about the worst thing a person can experience and something very private. Partly I sing my own lyrics in Danish for the first time. But both are a great liberation for me." Prior to the release, the first single, "Et hav af utstrakte hænder" was released on 23 August 2010.

== Reception ==
Troen & Ingen received positive reviews. On 29 October 2010, the album debuted at number one on the Hitlisten, the Danish album chart. In March 2011, the album was certified platinum for 20,000 copies sold.

== Track listing ==
All tracks are written by Søren Huss.

Troen & Ingen track listing
No.	Title	Length
1.	"Som mejslet i massiv granit"	3:59
2.	"Velkommen hjem"	4:09
3.	"Du er"	3:35
4.	"Fra tanke til..."	3:43
5.	"... Hvorfor?"	3:49
6.	"Svigt"	4:22
7.	"Jeg finder vej"	3:57
8.	"Intet er, intet bli'r"	3:44
9.	"Et hav af udstrakte hænder"	4:18
10.	"Troen og ingen"	3:33
11.	"Tak for dansen"	4:54

== Charts ==
Chart (2011)	Peak position
Danish Albums (Hitlisten)	1
