= Simpatico =

Simpatico may refer to:

== Music ==
- Simpatico (D-A-D album), 1997
- Simpático (Gary McFarland and Gábor Szabó album), 1996
- Simpatico (Suzy Bogguss and Chet Atkins album), 1994
- Simpático (The Brian Lynch/Eddie Palmieri Project album), 2006
- Simpatico (The Charlatans album), 2006
- Simpatico (The Vandermark 5 album), 1998
- Simpatico (Velocity Girl album), 1994

== Other uses ==
- Simpatico (film), a 1999 feature film adapted from the 1993 play of same name
- Simpatico (play), a 1993 play by Sam Shepard

== See also ==
- Sympatico, the former name of Bell Canada's internet service
