= Dalton (band) =

Danish supergroup

- Origin: Denmark
- Years active: 1983–1993; 2005 (reunion); 2009–present
- Members: Lars Lilholt, Johnny Madsen; Allan Olsen

Dalton is a Danish supergroup made up of singers Lars Lilholt, Johnny Madsen and Allan Olsen. The band was formed in 1983. After performing together for nearly a decade, the band released their self-titled debut album in 1992. The group disbanded shortly after touring in support of the album.

The band reunited in 2005, and released their sophomore album Tyve Ti in 2009. They toured throughout 2010 in support of the album. On November 13, 2010, the band released a third album titled Dalton Var Her!. The album included two CD's, as well as a DVD with footage documenting their most recent tour.

== Discography ==
=== Albums ===
- 1992: Dalton
- 2009: Tyve Ti
- 2010: Dalton Var Her!
