= Saybia (EP) =

EP by Saybia
- Released: 27 June 2001
- Recorded: 2001
- Genre: Rock
- Label: EMI

Saybia chronology
Saybia (2001)	The Second You Sleep (2002)

Saybia is the debut EP by Danish rock band Saybia.

== Track listing ==
All lyrics are written by Søren Huss; all music is composed by Saybia

No.	Title	Length
1.	"Fool's Corner"
2.	"The Day After Tomorrow"
3.	"Come on Closer"
4.	"Dressed in Black"
5.	"The Miracle in July (Demo Oktober 2000)"
6.	"The Second You Sleep (Live in Aalborg November 2000)"

== Musicians ==
- Søren Huss – vocals, acoustic guitar
- Jeppe Langebek Knudsen – bass
- Palle Sørensen – drums
- Sebastian Sandstrøm – guitar
- Jess Jenson – keyboards

== In other media ==
The song "Fool's Corner" was used on the soundtrack of the 2001 Danish film En kort en lang.
