= Søren Huss =

Danish singer and musician

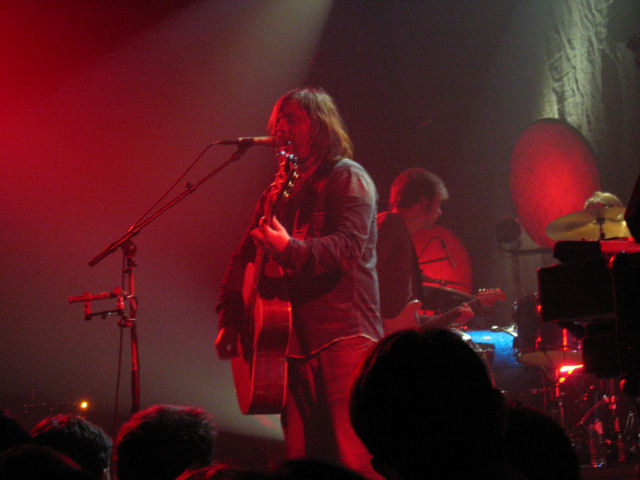
- Singing in a Saybia concert in 2005

Background information
- Born: 6 September 1975 (age 49); Nyborg, Denmark
- Occupation(s): Singer, songwriter, musician
- Instrument(s): Vocals, guitar, keyboards
- Years active: 1993–present
- Labels: Universal Music

Søren Huss (born 6 September 1975) is a Danish singer, songwriter and musician. Prior to a solo career, he is best known as the lead singer and lyricist of the rock band Saybia, which was formed in Nyborg in January 1993. After a hiatus of 7 years, Saybia announced in June 2015 their new album will come out in October.

On 18 October 2010 Huss released his first solo album Troen & ingen on Universal. The album was well received by the Danish reviewers, and was a commercial success reaching #1 on Hitlisten, the Danish Albums Chart and was awarded platinum.

On 15 October 2012 Huss released his second album Oppefra og ned which charted straight in #1 in the albums chart.

== Personal life ==
Huss was born in Nyborg. He has a daughter called Ronja by his former partner, school teacher Camilla Jørgensen, who died in a traffic accident in Valby on 17 December 2007.

== Awards ==
During the Danish Music Awards in 2011, Huss won "Best male artist" award in 2011 for his work on his 2010 album Troen & ingen

== Discography ==
(For discography of albums and singles with Saybia, refer to the Saybia discography section.)

=== Albums ===
Year	Album	Peak position	Certification
Year	Album	DEN	Certification
2010	Troen & Ingen	1	
2012	Oppefra & Ned	1	
2017	Midtlivsvisen	4	
2018	Bertolt Brechts Svendborgdigte	29	
2019	Sort og hvid til evig tid	8	
2024	Vi fik mere, end vi kom for	3	

=== Singles ===
Year	Title	Peak position	Album
Year	Title	DEN	Album
2010	"Et Hav Af Udstrakte Hænder"	22	Troen & Ingen

Featured in

Year	Title	Peak position	Album
Year	Title	DEN	Album
2013	"Ocean of You" (Nik & Jay feat. Søren Huss )	6	Nik & Jay EP; Copenhagen Pop Cartel
