= Good Clean Family Entertainment You Can Trust =

Compilation album by D-A-D
- Released: 9 November 1995
- Genre: Cowpunk, hard rock
- Label: Medley Records

D-A-D chronology
Farligt Venskab (1995)	Good Clean Family Entertainment You Can Trust (1995)	De Største Helte (1996)

Good Clean Family Entertainment You Can Trust is a compilation album by the Danish rock group D-A-D, containing material from 1985 to 1995. The compilation was released on 9 November 1995.

== Track listing ==
1. "Sleeping My Day Away"
2. "Bad Craziness"
3. "Jihad"
4. "Grow or Pay"
5. "Reconstrucdead"
6. "Laugh'n'A 1/2"
7. "Marlboro Man"
8. "Rim of Hell"
9. "Girl Nation"
10. "Point of View"
11. "Helpyourselfish"
12. "I Won't Cut My Hair (Live)"
13. "Riding with Sue (Live)"
14. "It's After Dark (Live)"
15. "Counting the Cattle"
