= Psychopatico =

Live album by D-A-D
- Released: 20 November 1998
- Genre: Cowpunk, Hard rock
- Label: Medley

D-A-D chronology
Simpatico (1997)	Psychopatico (1998)	Nattens Engel (1998)

Psychopatico is the second live album by the Danish rock group D-A-D, and the first to be published outside Japan. The album was released on 20 November 1998.
The recordings on the double album was made during the Mad Days Tour in the same year. At the Danish Grammy Awards 1999 the album was elected Danish Rock Album of the Year. Psychopatico contains a studio recording of the new track, "Jacketless in December" which was released as the first single of the album.

== Track listing ==
=== CD1 ===
1. "Simpatico"
2. "Empty Heads"
3. "Bad Craziness"
4. "Grow Or Pay"
5. "Riding With Sue"
6. "Hate To Say..."
7. "I Won't Cut My Hair"
8. "Cloudy Hours"

=== CD2 ===
1. "Reconstrucdead"
2. "Black Crickets"
3. "Home Alone 5"
4. "Sleeping My Day Away"
5. "Jihad"
6. "Written In Water"
7. "It's After Dark"
8. "Laugh 'n' A 1/2"
9. "Jacketless In December"

== Releases ==
Region	Date	Format	Label
Denmark	November 20, 1998	CD	Medley Records
Japan	1998	CD	Toshiba EMI LTD
Great Britain	May 20, 2013	CD	Southworld Recordings
Germany	June 14, 2013	CD	AFM Records
