= Monster Philosophy =

Studio album by D-A-D
- Released: 10 November 2008
- Recorded: 2008
- Genre: Rock, hard rock
- Length: 50:53
- Label: EMI
- Producer: Joshua

D-A-D chronology
Scare Yourself Alive (2006)	Monster Philosophy (2008)	The Overmuch Box (2009)

Professional ratings
Review scores
Source	Rating
Gaffa	2/6 stars

Monster Philosophy is the tenth album by Danish rock band D-A-D. It was released on 10 November 2008. The album was produced by Danish producer Jon "Joshua" Schumann, who has previously produced records for bands as Kashmir, Mew and Kent. The basic tracks for the album were recorded over a two-week period in at Shorefire Recording Studios in New Jersey. Overdubs and further post-production took place in Mannsion Studios and Sun Studios in Copenhagen.

== Origins of the title and cover ==
According to the booklet that comes with The Overmuch Box (2009), the original title of the album was supposed to be Black Disco. That's due to the songs "Monster Philosophy" and "Too Deep for Me", which have classic disco rhythms. But D-A-D "mated" the disco with their heavy rock resulting into Monster Philosophy. "Monster Philosophy" track was completed rather early, with changed title and lyrics, but D-A-D was excited about the song. In hindsight "Monster Philosophy" is the song that a little bit sticks out of the record: album has both hard-hitting songs, ballads, and also the ones that have mixed tempo.

If nothing else, the cover fits the title song, even if the both are not reflecting the whole album. The cover is a mix of Rodin's "The Thinker" and the D-A-D emblem, a scull of a cow. Søren A. (Søren Schæfer Andersen) didn't get any reply for his request to photograph Auguste Rodin's statue in Paris, and time was running out. Søren along with his photographer went down to Paris and took photos in Rodin museum's garden, without permission. They were soon surrounded by the guards. Søren handed them out a written request, and pretended he don't understand any French—and the guards didn't speak any English either. The deadlock created almost 10 minutes of chaos, then the guards kicked the pair out—but the photos had already been taken.

== Track list ==
The title track "Monster Philosophy" was released as the lead single for the album. Lead singer Jesper Binzer first announced on the band's online diary, that the album would contain 13 songs. On their 2007 and 2008 summer tours D-A-D played "Money Always Takes the Place of Life", "Beautiful Together" and "Too Deep for Me" (then titled Roxity). They also performed a song called "The Tyrants" that has been omitted from the album, but was released as a single b-side with the 2009 release of The Overmuch Box under the title "Tyrants".

1. "Revolution" 3:23
2. "Nightmares in the Daytime" 3:56
3. "Too Deep for Me" 4:10
4. "Beautiful Together" 3:18
5. "Monster Philosophy" 3:37
6. "Milk and Honey" 4:13
7. "You Won't Change" 3:29
8. "If You Had a Head" 2:46
9. "I Am the River" 4:09
10. "Chainsaw" 3:21
11. "Money Always Takes the Place of Life" 4:02
12. "Nightstalker" 6:05
13. "If I Succeed" 4:19
14. "House of Fun" 3:39 (bonus track on Japanese and German versions of the album)

== Charts ==
Chart (2008)	Peak position
Danish Albums (Hitlisten)	1
Swedish Albums (Sverigetopplistan)	46
