= Oppefra & Ned =

2010 studio album by Søren Huss

Studio album by Søren Huss
- Released: 15 October 2012
- Studio: A Kind of Eden (Køge); STC Studios (Copenhagen)
- Genre: Pop, rock
- Label: Universal Music Denmark
- Producer: Søren Huss; Hussband

Søren Huss chronology
| Troen & Ingen (2010) | Oppefra & Ned (2012) | MidtlivsVisen (2017) |

Singles from Oppefra & Ned
- 1. "Den dér isme" Released: 10 September 2012; 2. "De sorte tal" Released: 29 October 2012; 3. "Øjeblikket" Released: February 2013

Oppefra & Ned is the second studio album by Danish singer and songwriter Søren Huss. It was released on 15 October 2012 through Universal Music Denmark.

== Background and promotion ==
"Oppefra & Ned" follows Huss's solo debut Troen & Ingen (2010), which dealt with the grief of losing his girlfriend in a traffic accident. Unlike the previous album, there are no love songs on Oppefra & Ned, as he felt he needed a "musical kick in the ass". Huss stated that "Troen & Ingen was almost a long love story and characterized by the fact that I was in deep grief. It's different this time. I'm no longer in grief, I've moved on in my life and have strived to make a more up-tempo record that is about other things."

The album was primarily recorded at Saybia's studio A Kind of Eden in Køge, and was produced by Søren Huss together with Hussband, which consists of Christoffer Møller, Jeppe Kjellberg, Morten Jørgensen and Jesper Elnegaard.

"Den dér isme" was released as the album's first single on 10 September 2012. About the song, Søren Huss said: "I won't deny that this song is related to old-fashioned protest songs. But where the songs of the 70s often stood on one side, polished the halo, moralized and incited to fight, this one is written in impotence. [...] The song should simply be seen as a comment and an inevitable outburst of frustration at not being able to see a change or solution on the horizon." On 29 October 2012, "De sorte tal" was released as the second single from the album.

== Commercial performance ==
"Oppefra & Ned" debuted at number one on the Hitlisten, the Danish album chart, on 26 October 2012, with 1,962 copies sold in its first week. The album was certified gold in April 2013 for 10,000 copies sold.

== Track listing ==
All tracks are written by Søren Huss.

Oppefra & Ned track listing
| No. | Title | Length |
|---|---|---|
| 1. | "Det er ganske enkelt" | 3:57 |
| 2. | "De sorte tal" | 3:45 |
| 3. | "Den dér isme" | 3:43 |
| 4. | "Oppefra & Ned" | 3:48 |
| 5. | "Ambassade" | 5:05 |
| 6. | "Fru Mørke" | 3:29 |
| 7. | "Koma" | 5:05 |
| 8. | "Adgang forbudt" | 3:50 |
| 9. | "Øjeblikket" | 3:49 |
| 10. | "Den smukkeste sommerdag" | 3:57 |

== Charts ==
| Chart (2012) | Peak position |
|---|---|
| Danish Albums (Hitlisten) | 1 |
