= Eyes on the Highway =

Studio album by Saybia
- Released: 2007
- Recorded: 2006–2007
- Genre: Rock
- Label: EMI

Saybia chronology
These Are the Days (2004)	Eyes on the Highway (2007)	No Sound from the Outside (2015)

Eyes on the Highway is the third studio album of the Danish rock band Saybia. Released in 2007, it was a hit for them in Denmark where it reached #1. It was also a top 20 albums hit in Netherlands, Norway and Switzerland.

== Track list ==
1. "On Her Behalf"
2. "Eyes on the Highway"
3. "Angel"
4. "Godspeed Into the Future"
5. "The Odds"
6. "Romeo"
7. "Pretender"
8. "Gypsy"
9. "A Way Out"
10. "A Walk in the Park"
11. "At The End of Blue"
