= DIC·NII·LAN·DAFT·ERD·ARK =

Studio album by D-A-D
- Released: 14 November 2011
- Recorded: 2011
- Genre: Rock, Hard Rock
- Label: Mermaid Records
- Producer: Nick Foss

D-A-D chronology
Behind The Seen (2009)	DIC·NII·LAN·DAFT·ERD·ARK (2011)

Singles from D-A-D
- 1. "I Want What She's Got" Released: 30 September 2011; 2. "Last Time in Neverland" Released: 31 January 2012; 3. "We All Fall Down" Released: 28 May 2012

DIC·NII·LAN·DAFT·ERD·ARK is the eleventh studio album by Danish rock band D-A-D. It was released on 14 November 2011 on Mermaid Records.

The album was nominated for the Danish Rock release of the Year at the Danish Music Awards in 2012.

== Track list ==
1. "A New Age Moving In" (4:18)
2. "I Want What She's Got" (4:04)
3. "The End" (3:45)
4. "Fast on Wheels" (4:06)
5. "The Place of the Heart" (3:41)
6. "The Last Time in Neverland" (3:51)
7. "Breaking Them Heart by Heart" (4:26)
8. "We All Fall Down" (4:59)
9. "The Wild Thing in the Woods" (4:50)
10. "Can't Explain What It Means" (3:16)
11. "Drag Me to the Curb" (3:36)
12. "Your Lips Are Sealed" (5:33)

== Charts ==
Chart (2011)	Peak position
Danish Albums (Hitlisten)	2
Finnish Albums (Suomen virallinen lista)	48
German Albums (Offizielle Top 100)	97
Swedish Albums (Sverigetopplistan)	32
