= Scare Yourself Alive =

Live album by D-A-D
- Released: 1 May 2006
- Genre: Cowpunk, Hard rock
- Label: EMI-Medley

D-A-D chronology
Scare Yourself (2005)	Scare Yourself Alive (2006)	Monster Philosophy (2008)

Scare Yourself Alive is the third live album by the Danish rock group D-A-D. The album was released in May 2006 via EMI.

The album also contains a DVD with recordings of a concert at Roskilde Festival 2005 and a concert from K.B. Hallen in Copenhagen in 2005.

== Track listing ==
=== CD ===
1. "Lawrence Of Suburbia"
2. "A Good Day"
3. "Isn't That Wild"
4. "Scare Yourself"
5. "Something Good"
6. "Makin' Fun Of Money"
7. "Jihad"
8. "Ridin' With Sue"
9. "Everything Glows"
10. "Sleeping My Day Away"
11. "Bad Craziness"
12. "Unexplained"
13. "Camping In Scandinavia"
14. "Evil Twin"
15. "Overmuch"
16. "It's After Dark"

=== DVD ===
Roskilde Festival July 1, 2005

1. Lawrence Of Suburbia
2. Scare Yourself
3. The Roads Below Me
4. Soft Dogs
5. Hey Now
6. Jihad
7. Grow Or Pay
8. Something Good
9. Everything Glows
10. Unexplained
11. Camping In Scandinavia
12. Bad Craziness
13. Marlboro Man
14. Sleeping My Day Away
15. Laugh-N A Half
16. Its After Dark

K.B. Hallen November 4, 2005

17. "Isnt That Wild"
18. "Home Alone 5"
19. "Alright"
20. "Makin Tons Of Money"
21. "Jihad"
22. "Ridin With Sue"
23. "Hate 2 Say I Told U So"
24. "Unexplained"
25. "Camping In Scandinavia"
26. "Evil Twin"
27. "Overmuch"

+ "A Day At The Office"
