= Helpyourselfish =

Studio album by D-A-D
- Released: 1 March 1995
- Genre: Hard rock
- Label: Medley
- Producer: Paul Northfield

D-A-D chronology
Riskin' It All (1991)	Helpyourselfish (1995)	Farligt Venskab (1995)

Professional ratings
Review scores
Source	Rating
AllMusic	4/5 stars
Gaffa	(link)

Helpyourselfish is the 5th studio album from Danish rock band D-A-D. It was released on 1 March 1995 and is the follow-up album to the highly successful Riskin' It All. It features a break from most D-A-D-albums, with a heavier sound.

== Track listing ==
1. "Reconstrucdead" - 4:15
2. "Written in Water" - 4:24
3. "Helpyourselfish" - 4:40
4. "Soulbender" - 5:34
5. "Unowned" - 4:16
6. "Candid" - 3:20
7. "Blood In/Out" - 3:16
8. "Prayin' to a God" - 4:37
9. "Naked (But Still Stripping)" - 4:43
10. "Are We Alive Here???" - 4:50
11. "It'swhenit'swrongit'sright" - 2:43
12. "Flat" - 4:32
13. "Time Swallows Time" (Bonus-track on the Japanese edition)

To date the album has sold 102,000+ copies in Denmark.

== Charts ==
Chart (1995)	Peak position
Finnish Albums (The Official Finnish Charts)	14
Norwegian Albums (VG-lista)	21
