= Natural Born Hippies =

Male Danish pop rock group

- Origin: Randers, Denmark
- Genres: Pop rock, punk pop
- Years active: 1997-present
- Labels: Iceberg Music Group
- Members: Dan Haugesen; Bo Christensen; Tom Lindby; Sune Thorbjørnsen

Natural Born Hippies is a Danish pop rock group.

== History ==
In 1996, the band formed in Randers, Denmark when Dan Hougesen, Sune Thorbjornsen, Bo Christensen, and Tom Lindby met. The following year, they signed with Iceberg Records. Their cover of “Lola (If You Ever)” reached number 72 in Germany, and number 25 in Italy. In 1999 they released Popshit as their debut album (re-issued in 2000).

In 2001, they released their second album and a song titled after it, I Don’t Care. The song, “Best Looking Guy in Town” was released as a single and was used as part of the soundtrack of video game tie-in to the Pixar 2006 film, Cars. This song was also used as part of the 2007 racing game Juiced 2 Hot import Nights which it was deleted from the game Their album In Your Dreams was produced by Lutz Rahn and Mark Wills. Their cover of “Get It On” by T. Rex charted at 92 in Germany. In 2004, their fourth album Wake Up Calls was released.

In 2018, they released “Mandela Under the Sun” as a single, and the song was used as the theme song for Nelson Mandela Library Project in South Africa. They debuted the single during Go' morgen Danmark and it placed at number 2 on Danish Viral Spotify Charts.

== Discography ==
Albums

- Popshit (1999)
- I Don't Care (2001)
- In Your Dreams (2002)
- Wake Up Calls (2004)

Singles

- "Lola (if you ever...)" (1999)
- "Save Me" (1999)
- "Lovestream" (1999)
- "Spiderman" (1999)
- "I Don't Care" (2001)
- "Best Looking Guy in Town" (2001)
- "Get It On" (2002)
- "Mandela Under the Sun" (2018)
- "Mandela Under the Sun (The Danish Edition)" (2018)
