= Sleeping My Day Away =

Single by D-A-D

from the album No Fuel Left for the Pilgrims
- Released: 1989
- Recorded: 1989
- Genre: Hard rock, glam metal
- Length: 4:23
- Label: WEA
- Producer: Nick Foss

D-A-D singles chronology
"A Horse With No Name" (1987)	"Sleeping My Day Away" (1989)	"Girl Nation" (1989)

Music video
- "Sleeping My Day Away" on YouTube

"Sleeping My Day Away" is the most successful single from the Danish rock band D-A-D outside Denmark, with two weeks on the UK top 100. The single was released in 1989, with "Ill Will" as the b-side. Both songs appear on their No Fuel Left for the Pilgrims album.

The song was covered by German gothic rock band Mono Inc. for their album Pain, Love & Poetry. Danish pop group Me & My also did a cover of the song for their third album Flying High.

== Music video ==
The official music video for the song was directed by Andy Morahan, and takes place primarily in a bedroom. The music video received heavy airplay on MTV.

== Track listing ==
1. "Sleeping My Day Away"
2. "Ill Will"

== Charts ==
Chart (1989/90)	Peak position
Australia (ARIA Charts)	63
UK Singles (Official Charts Company)	87
US Album Rock Tracks (Billboard)	23
