= These Are the Days (Saybia album) =

These Are The Days

Studio album by Saybia
- Released: 2004
- Recorded: 2003–2004
- Genre: Rock
- Label: EMI

Saybia chronology
| The Second You Sleep (2002) | These Are The Days (2004) | Eyes On The Highway (2007) |

These Are The Days is the second studio album by Danish rock band Saybia, released on September 13, 2004.

== Track listing ==
All lyrics are written by Søren Huss; all music is composed by Saybia

| No. | Title | Length |
|---|---|---|
| 1. | "Brilliant Sky" | 3:46 |
| 2. | "Bend The Rules" | 3:11 |
| 3. | "I Surrender" | 3:39 |
| 4. | "Guardian Angel" | 4:11 |
| 5. | "We Almost Made It" | 3:52 |
| 6. | "Soul United" | 4:31 |
| 7. | "Flags" | 4:04 |
| 8. | "The Haunted House on the Hill" | 4:50 |
| 9. | "Stranded" | 5:24 |
| 10. | "It's Ok Love" | 4:44 |
| 11. | "Untitled" | 17:18 |

== Musicians ==
- Søren Huss – vocals, acoustic guitar
- Jeppe Langebek Knudsen – bass
- Palle Sørensen – drums
- Sebastian Sandstrøm – guitar
- Jess Jenson – keyboards
