= Lars Lilholt =

Danish musical artist (b. 1953)

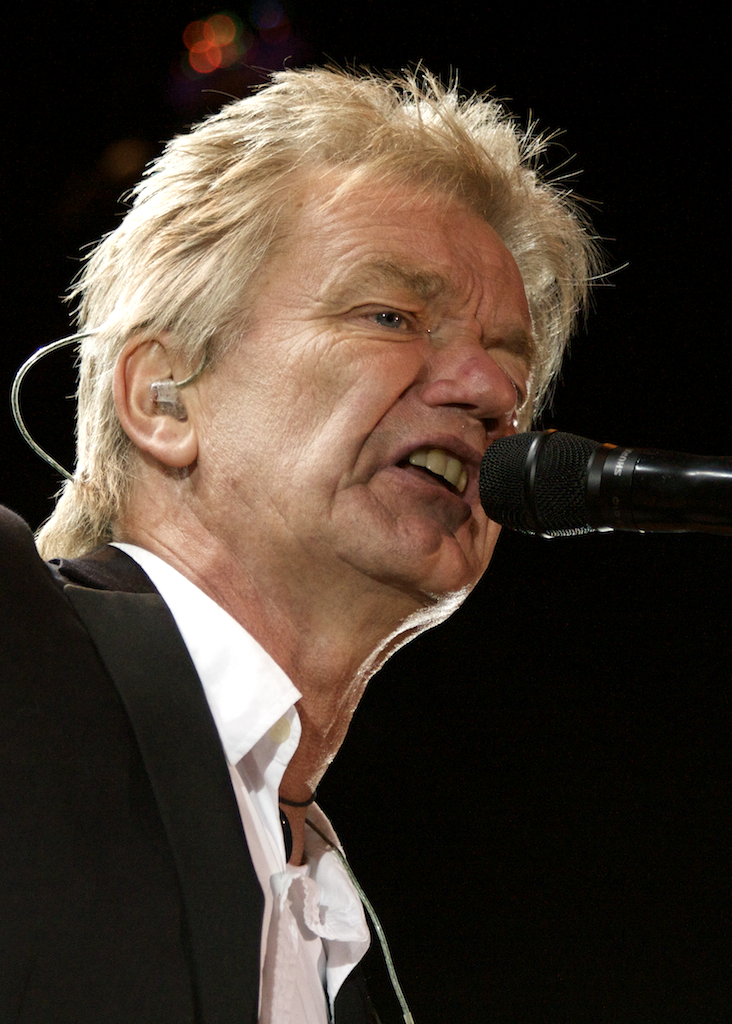
- Lars Lilholt, Nibe Festival 2009

Background information
- Born: 14 March 1953 (age 72); Denmark
- Genres: Rock, Folk Rock, Pop
- Occupations: Musician, songwriter
- Years active: 1970 – present
- Website: www.larslilholtband.dk

Lars Lilholt Band
- Origin: Denmark
- Genres: Folk
- Years active: 1983–present
- Members: Lars Lilholt; Gert Vincent; Klaus Thrane; Tom Bilde; Kristian Fogh; Eskild Dohn; M.C. Ride
- Past members: Kristian Lilholt; Tine Lilholt; Tommy Kejser; H.C. Röder; H.C. Andersen
- Website: web.archive.org/web/20070106194558/http://www.larslilholtband.dk/

Lars Lilholt (born in Herlev, Denmark on 14 March 1953) is a Danish singer, violinist, guitarist and composer.

== Career ==
=== Kræn Bysted's ===
In the early 1970s, he was part of Kræn Bysted's, a Danish acoustic folk, electric folk and rock group made up of Lars Lilholt, Jacob Ohrt and Lars Dam, all from Aalborg. The singer Inger Nyholm from Silkeborg joined in 1975 and drummer Jens Jørgen Pedersen in 1977. The group had various bass players contributing including Jakob Dalsgaard, Karsten Kongsøre, Johs Stærk and Ole Grønbæk.

=== Lars Lilholt Band ===
He performs with his band Lars Lilholt Band. In 1982, he released album Og fanden dukked' op og sagde ja, his first solo album. He formed Lars Lilholt Band the following year made up of Lars Lilholt, Tine Lilholt, Kristian Lilholt, Gert Vincent and Tommy Kejser. When Kejser became manager of the band, he was replaced by Tom Bilde (from Mek Pek Partyband)

The band has seen many changes and the present set-up is made up of Lars Lilholt (vocals, violin, guitar), Gert Vincent (electric guitar), Klaus Thrane (drums, percussion), Tom Bilde (bass), Kristian Fogh (keyboard) and Eskild Dohn (trumpet, saxophone).

Lilholt has written hundreds of songs, but by far the most famous is "Kald det kærlighed" (meaning Call it love).

=== Dalton ===
He was also part of a Danish supergroup named Dalton made up of Lilholt, Johnny Madsen and Allan Olsen. It was formed in 1983 but had to wait till 1992 for their first album Dalton. They reunited in 2005 to work on new materials and had a comeback in 2010 for a grand tour.

== Discography ==
=== Albums ===
==== Lars Lilholt ====
Year	Album	Peak positions	Notes
Year	Album	DEN	Notes
1982	Og fanden dukked' op og sagde ja!		
1984	Jens Langkniv		
1986	Portland		
1986	I en sommernat		
1989	Engang drog vi ud for at slå tiden ihjel		
1991	Med natten mod vest		
2003	Nefertiti	1	
2006	Storyteller #1	4	Live album, DVD + 3 CDs)
2008	Jokerne	13	
2013	Manifest	3	Compilation album DEN: Gold
2015	Amulet	1	
2018	Drømmefanger	2	
2020	Lad julen vare længe	2	

==== Lars Lilholt Band ====
Year	Album	Peak positions	Notes
Year	Album	DEN	Notes
1990	Kontakt		Live album
1993	Kald det kærlighed		
1994	Kong Pukkelrygs land		
1995	Et ekko af sommer		Live album
1996	Lars Lilholt Band		
1997	Masai		
1998	Gi' det blå tilbage		
2001	Gloria	1	
2004	De instrumentale	–	
2004	Den 7. dag	2	
2005	De lyse nætters orkester	1	live DVD + 2 CDs
2007	Pausemusikken – Mens vi venter	–	
2008	Smukkere med tiden	1	
2012	Stilheden bag stojen	2	
2021	Decameron	2	
2024	Kosmiske Kindkys	9	

=== Albums with other bands ===
In Spillemændene fra Himmerland

- 1975: Liegstouw

Kræn Bysted's

- 1975: Gammel dansk MC
- 1977: Kræn Bysteds
- 1978: Den anden Kræn
- 1980: Stavnsbundet

Dalton

- 1992: Dalton
- 2009: Tyve Ti
- 2010: Var Her

=== Singles ===
Year	Single	Peak positions	Album
Year	Single	DEN	Album
1995	"Jul i Ingenmandsland"		
1997	"Kejserens Hukommelse"		Masai
1997	"Café Måneskin"		Masai
2000	"En-To-Tre-Fireogtyve"		
2001	"Digteren"		Gloria
2002	"Når Glæden Stråler"		
2003	"Nefertiti"		Nefertiti
2004	"Klovnen er død"	16	
2004	"Gaia"		
2006	"Flyv endelig højere"	10	
2007	"De lyse Nætters Orkester"		
2008	"Victoria"		
