= Vindens farver =

Vindens Farver

Studio album by Simone
- Released: April 11, 2005
- Recorded: 2004–2005
- Genre: Pop
- Length: 42:27

Simone chronology
Vindens Farver	On a Night Like This

Vindens Farver is the debut album of Danish pop-singer Simone and contains her takes on Disney songs, mostly Danish, though a few English.

== Track listing ==
1. "Vindens Farver" (From Pocahontas) – 4:32
2. "Leve Som Dem" (From The Little Mermaid) – 3:29
3. "Almægtige Ånder" (Danish version of Great Spirits from Brother Bear) – 3:29
4. "Reflection" – 3:20 (From Mulan)
5. "Når Du Ser Et Stjerneskud" (From Pinocchio)
6. "Can You Feel the Love Tonight" (From The Lion King)
7. "You'll Be in My Heart" (From Tarzan)
8. "Det Er Ganske Vist" (From Beauty and the Beast)
9. "Shooting Star" (Original)
10. "Et Helt Nyt Liv" (From Aladdin)
11. "The Second Star to the Right" (From Peter Pan)

== Chart history ==
The album debuted on No. 1 on the Danish Albums Top 40 and stayed on the list for 34 weeks ending on No. 38.
