= Cirkus Arena =

Danish circus

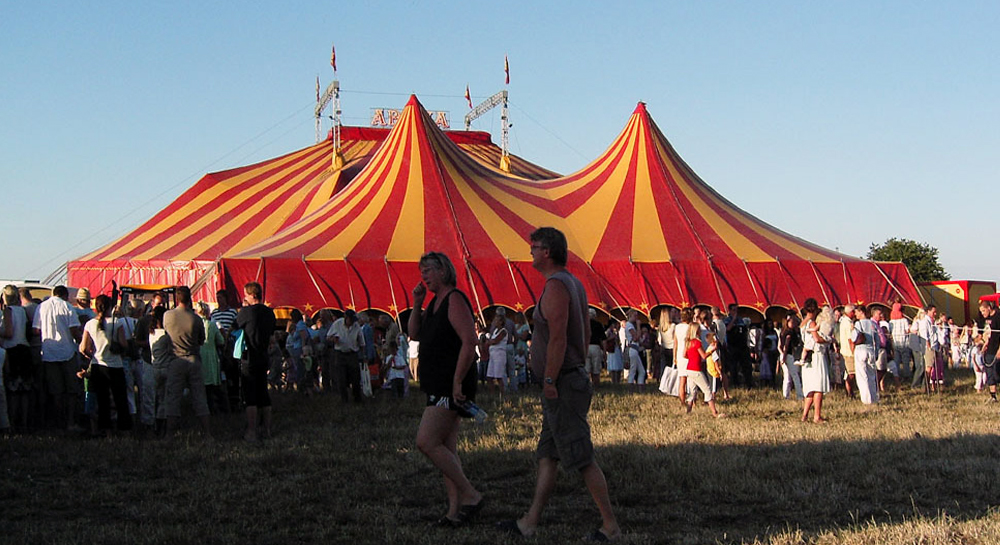
- Circus Arena in Denmark in July 2006

Origin
- Country: Denmark
- Founder(s): Arne Victor Olsen later known as Arne Berdino
- Year founded: 1955

Information
- Director: Benny Berdino-Olsen
- Traveling show?: Yes
- Circus tent?: 1.750 seats
- Winter quarters: Slagelse, Denmark
- Website: www.arena.dk

Cirkus Arena is a Danish circus that was founded in 1955. Today it is the largest circus in Scandinavia and within the nordic countries. Cirkus Arena's tent is 45 meters in diameter and can accommodate 1,750 spectators. They have several other tents that are rented out. The tour runs from March to September, where the circus visits more than 100 Danish town's and cities. Since 1976 Circus Arena has been led by Benny Berdino-Olsen as director.

The Circus Arena has winter quarter in Slagelse. The winter quarters is built as a Circus Land with access for visitors during the winter holidays, summer holidays and autumn holidays, which offers a wide range of activities, rides and small performances.

== History ==
Circus Arena was founded in 1955 by the significant market entertainer Victor Arne Olsen (later known as Arne Berdino). The circus started out as a family business under the name Provincial Revue which performed at local markets. The name Berdino was constructed by Victor Arne Olsen by a mixture of the name of a well-known escape artist Bernadi and a monkey named Dino. Two years later he renamed the venture to Circus Arena. In 1958 the preview show changed from being an attraction at markets on weekends to actual standalone circus performances and after 1959 Circus Arena was completely freed from the market craze. The Circus Arena started with a small so-called "hangar tent" with seats for around 100 guests. It was replaced after a few years with a slightly larger two-masted circus tent. In the first years the circus troupe consisted solely of the Berdino family who in addition to Arne Berdino consisted of the daughter Jytte and the son Benny as performers as well as Mrs. Lydia. The first circus troupe in Circus Arena also included the clown Larno (Georg Larsen) who was considered by the Berdinos to be part of the family and because of this the performance was marketed as "The cozy family circus". In the following years more artists joined in and the small business expanded from being Denmark's smallest circus into a neat medium-sized business with a four-masted circus tent. His son Benny Berdino took over Circus Arena in 1976 after his father's sudden death and over the following decades he expanded the business into the largest circus in Scandinavia and within the nordic countries with several traveling businesses. In 2008 Benny Berdino received the Knight Cross of the Order of the Dannebrog. In 2016 he also received the Danish Circus Award.

== Incidents ==
=== 2013 tent collapse ===
In June 2013 one of Cirkus Arena's tents collapsed during a private corporate performance for about 550 guests in Kalundborg. No one was seriously injured but nine were injured two of whom were sent to observation at the hospital with a concussion and hip fracture respectively. The tent collapsed under heavy winds, but a report from the Danish Working Environment Service in August of the same year concluded that the actual setting up of the tent was the cause of the collapse and not the weather and the circus was given an injunction by the authorities. In January 2014 the prosecutor in the case demanded that Cirkus Arena's manager Jackie Berdino-Olsen should be held responsible for the episode. On April 30, 2015 the court dismissed all charges against Jackie Berdino-Olsen in the case of the tent collapse at Kalundborg.

=== 2015 elephant stampede ===
In 2015, tourists caught Cirkus Arena's elephants rampaging in the Danish seaside town of Karrebaeksminde after becoming distressed by a crowd. A worker appeared to hit the elephants as they were bathing, causing the animal to attack a nearby vehicle. The incident caused Danish animal rights organizations to call for the immediate ban on travelling circus animals.

=== The 2019 circus elephant ban case ===
In February 2018 the former Minister for the Environment and Food Jakob Ellemann-Jensen introduced a bill banning "wild animals in the circuses in Denmark". The then government entered into an agreement with the Social Democrats and the Danish People's Party on March 23, 2018 to obtain the necessary majority in the Danish Parliament (Folketinget) for the proposal to banned wild animals in the circus. The ban included elephants, sea lions and zebras as well as all other wild animals already banned by Danish law. The conciliation parties arranged for a certain transitional arrangement for the four circus elephants in Denmark at the time (three in Circus Arena and one in Circus Trapez). However the law did not reach adoption before the 2019 Danish general election which meant that it was still allowed to show elephants, sea lions and zebras if the conditions of the decree on holding and displaying animals in the circus were fulfilled.

Already in 2018 Knuthenborg Safaripark had offered to receive the four circus elephants. In order to ensure that the elephants did not bring any diseases to the other animals in Knuthenborg Safaripark they were placed in quarantine since in the case of elephants there is a particular risk of tuberculosis. Circus Arena's three elephants Lara and Djungla at 31 years and Jenny at 29 years underwent a health check in December and in January 2019 Circus Trapez's 35-year-old elephant Ramboline also underwent a health check. To perform a health examination of an elephant it is necessary to semi-sedate it which involves a risk that something could go wrong and the animal dies. Therefore, efforts should be made to sedate the animals as few times as possible. In order to maintain the offer to receive the elephants in Knuthenborg Safari Park and to get the indispensable guarantee that the elephants were tuberculosis-free they could not be moved from their land and barn. The postponement of the bill against "wild animals in the circuses in Denmark" caused the circus elephants to stay in their barn for months without clarifying their future which caused them to be distracted and according to a veterinarian "close to being exposed to mental animal abuse".

A further complication to this case is the issue of financial compensation to the circuses for their elephants. Benny Berdino had calculated that the costs of Circus Arena including investment in the required housing conditions amounted to almost 40 million Danish krones. He believed that 20 million was a fair compensation for the elephants and the remaining investment in housing conditions made in accordance with the rules adopted by the Danish Parliament (Folketinget) in June 2009 based on a report from 2008 prepared by the Ministry of Justices working group on the holding of animals in the circuses. The rules and the later order on the holding of animals in the circuses made it legal to allow elephants to perform but made a number of demands. However the former government had only set aside 7 million Danish krones in the Finance Act for compensation or 1.75 million Danish krones for each elephant considering that was the maximum that the Danish state could pay without violating European Unions rules on state aid.

The web portal Cirkus in Denmark mentioned in their news report that when Cirkus Benneweis sold its three elephants in 1995 the best bid then was 250,000 Deutsche Marks for each elephant corresponding to approximately 950,000 Danish krones in 1995 (in 2018 that would correspond to approximately 1.5 million Danish krones).

In 2020, the elephants moved to their final home at Knuthenborg Safari Park.
