= Simone Egeriis =

Simone
- Born: 28 January 1992 (age 33); Slagelse, Denmark
- Genres: Pop, Dance, Schlager
- Website: simone.dk

Simone Egeriis (born 28 January 1992), better known as simply Simone, is a Danish pop singer. She was born and raised in Slagelse, Denmark. She is known in Denmark for winning the Danish TV talent show Scenen er din ('The Stage is Yours') in the category Junior Singing. She has since released three studio albums – her debut was called Vindens Farver or Colours of the Wind, the song from Disney's Pocahontas, with which she won Scenen er Din. She also plays the violin and the piano.

== Biography ==
=== Early years ===
Simone's mother and father are divorced and she lives with her mother and her older sister Stephanie in Slagelse, where her father also lives. She started singing at a very young age and went on to do children's musicals. At age nine she began in the children's gospel choir 'Himmelsus'.

=== Scenen er din ===
When she first went on 'The Stage is Yours' the judges totally loved her and she got top marks from them. She won the first season of the show in September in the category junior singing with the song Vindens Farver in the final.

=== Career ===
Simone's first studio album Vindens Farver was named after the winning song from Scenen er Din and is her most successful album. It included songs only from Walt Disney Pictures, both in Danish and English. Egeriis' second studio album was On a Night Like This, a holiday album which contained traditional Christmas songs both in Danish and English. In November 2006, she released the album Dreams Do Come True, being her first album with exclusively English language tracks.

=== Dansk Melodi Grand Prix ===
2010

Simone took part at the Dansk Melodi Grand Prix 2010, the national selection for the Eurovision Song Contest 2010, with the song "How Will I Know". She came in third place.

2013

Simone also took part in the Dansk Melodi Grand Prix 2013 with the song "Stay Awake" reaching the Superfinal (Final 3) stage. She came third again with Emmelie de Forest carrying the title with "Only Teardrops", who later went on to win Eurovision that year.

2016

Simone returned to Dansk Melodi Grand Prix 2016, with the song "Heart Shaped Hole". She came in third place for the third time, after reaching the Superfinal stage.

== Discography ==
=== Albums ===
Album details	Year	Chart peak (DEN)	Certification
*Vindens Farver: Released: 7 April 2005; Worldwide Sales: 100,000; Singles: Vindens Farver	2005	1	DEN: 3× Platinum
*On a Night Like This: Released: 11 November 2005; Worldwide Sales: 80,000	2005	2	DEN: 2× Platinum
Dreams Do Come True: Released: 3 November 2006; Worldwide Sales: 24,500; Singles: "That's When You Know" "As If" "Million Years" "Summer Vacation"	2006	9	DEN: Gold
Devoted to You: Released: 10 November 2008; Singles: "Hopelessly Devoted to You"	2008	5	

=== Singles ===
Year	Single	Chart peak (DEN)	Chart peak (NOR)	Certification	Album
2005	"Vindens Farver"	—	—		Vindens Farver
2006	"That's When You Know"	—	—		Dreams Do Come True
2006	"As If/Million Years"	—	—		Dreams Do Come True
2007	"Summer Vacation" (Factor 15 remix)	—	—		Dreams Do Come True
2008	"Hopelessly Devoted to You"	—	26		Devoted To You
2010	"How Will I Know"	17	—		
2013	"Stay Awake"	12	2		
2016	"Heart Shaped Hole"	—	—		
