= The Second You Sleep =

Studio album by Saybia
- Released: 21 January 2002
- Recorded: 2001–2002
- Studio: The Blue Room, Gävle, Sweden; Grapehouse Studio, Copenhagen Denmark; Medley Studio, Copenhagen, Denmark; CleanSound, Odense, Denmark
- Genre: Post-britpop
- Label: EMI, Medley
- Producer: Andreas Ahlenius, Saybia, Rune Westberg, Christian Backman (exec.)

Saybia chronology
Saybia (EP) (2001)	The Second You Sleep (2002)	These Are the Days (2004)

The Second You Sleep is the debut studio album by Danish rock band Saybia.

== Track listing ==
All lyrics are written by Søren Huss; all music is composed by Saybia

No.	Title	Length
1.	"7 Demons"	3:29
2.	"Fool's Corner"	4:34
3.	"The Second You Sleep"	4:39
4.	"Snake Tongued Beast"	4:14
5.	"Joy"	5:06
6.	"Still Falling"	3:33
7.	"The Day After Tomorrow"	4:13
8.	"In Spite Of"	4:39
9.	"Empty Stairs"	5:20
10.	"The Miracle in July"	6:41
11.	"The One for You"	5:41

== Musicians ==
- Søren Huss – vocals, acoustic guitar
- Jeppe Langebek Knudsen – bass
- Palle Sørensen – drums
- Sebastian Sandstrøm – guitar
- Jess Jenson – keyboards

== Certifications ==
Certifications for The Second You Sleep
Region	Certification	Certified units/sales
Denmark (IFPI Danmark)	7× Platinum	140,000^{‡}
^{‡} Sales+streaming figures based on certification alone.
