= Johnny Madsen =

Danish musician, songwriter and painter (1951–2024)

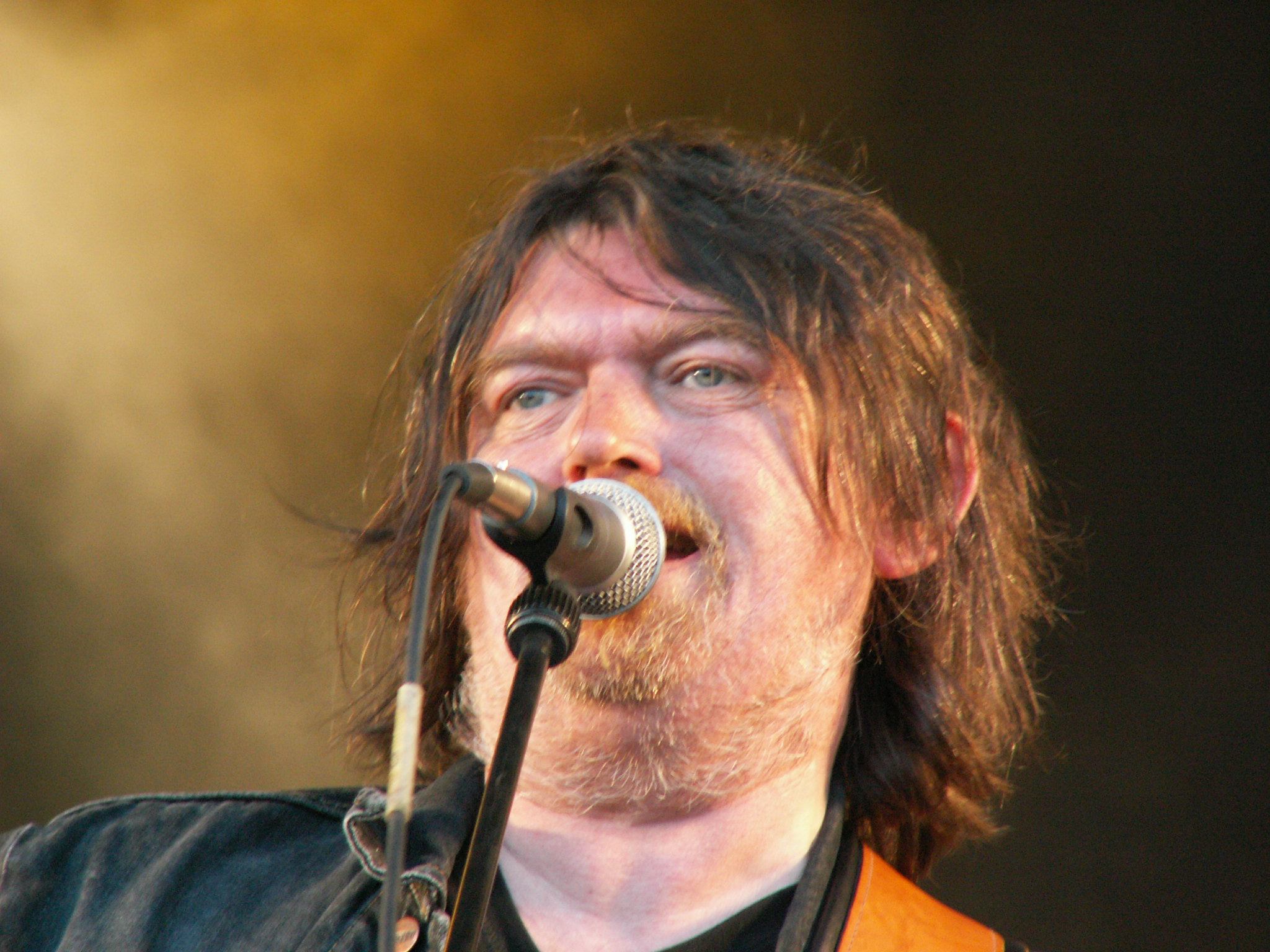
- Madsen in 2005

Background information
- Born: 31 March 1951; Thyborøn, Denmark
- Died: 4 November 2024 (aged 73)
- Genres: Rock; folk rock
- Occupations: Musician; songwriter
- Instruments: Guitar; banjo; harmonica
- Years active: 1975–2024
- Formerly of: Dalton
- Website: johnnymadsen.dk

Johnny Madsen (31 March 1951 – 4 November 2024) was a Danish musician, songwriter and painter. In the period 1983 to 1992, he was part of Dalton, a supergroup trio made of Madsen, Lars Lilholt and Allan Olsen. Johnny Madsen lived on the island of Fanø, where he had his own art gallery, "Madsens Malerier". He was also part of Hobo Ekspressen. Madsen died on 4 November 2024, at the age of 73.

== Painting ==
Madsen painted for many years, mostly inspired by expressionism and mentioned Vincent van Gogh and Jens Søndergaard as inspirations. Madsen exhibited in numerous galleries and at many events across Denmark and selected paintings are on permanent display at his art gallery on Fanø. In 2007, he published the book "Hvorom alting er", discussing the artistic process as he sees it, and showing a few of his own works. The book has only been printed in limited copies, with a few translated to English titled "By all means".

== Discography ==
=== Solo ===
Studio albums

- 1982: De tørre er de best... men våde er de flest
- 1986: Madsens septiktanker
- 1987: Chinatown, Yellow Moon og den sorte fugl
- 1988: Udenfor sæsonen
- 1989: Nattegn
- 1991: Bounty Blue
- 1994: Ses vi i Slesvig
- 1997: Room Service (1997)
- 1998: The Blues
- 1999: Checkpoint Charlie
- 2001: Den blinde lotterisælger
- 2003: Regnmanden
- 2007: Spidsen af kuglen
- 2011: Le New York
- 2015: Godt nyt

Live albums

- 1992: Halgal Halbal (double CD)

Compilation albums

- 1996: Madsens bedste – 40 af de fede (double CD)
- 2004: Madsen – på den anden side
- 2007: De Tørre & de bedste (double CD + DVD)

=== Dalton ===
Albums

- 1992: Dalton
- 2009: Tyve Ti
- 2010: Var Her (Live 2 CDs +DVD) (with Allan Olsen and Lars Lilholt)

== Sources ==
- Johnny Madsen
- Madsens Galleri
