= D-A-D (band) =

Danish rock band

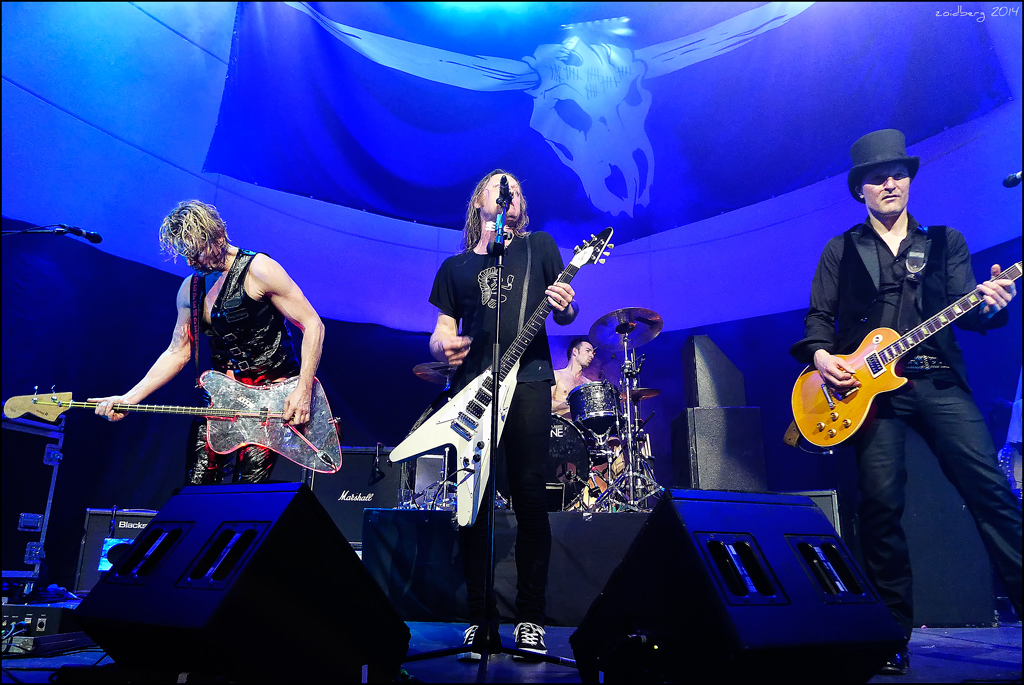
- D-A-D performing in 2014

Background information
- Also known as: Disneyland After Dark
- Origin: Copenhagen, Denmark
- Genres: Hard rock, glam metal
- Years active: 1982–present
- Labels: Mermaid; EMI; Warner Bros. (US) (1989–92)
- Members: Jesper Binzer; Jacob Binzer; Stig Pedersen; Laust Sonne
- Past members: Lene Glumer; Peter Lundholm Jensen
- Website: www.d-a-d.com

D-A-D (formerly stylized as D:A:D) is a Danish rock band. They were originally named Disneyland After Dark, but changed their name to avoid a lawsuit from The Walt Disney Company.

== History ==
In the early 1980s in Copenhagen, D-A-D started playing together under their original name Disneyland After Dark. Pedersen came up with the name based on the idea that when the lights are out in Disneyland, anything can happen. The first lineup of D-A-D consisted of Jesper, Stig, Peter and Stig's girlfriend, Lene Glumer. The band's debut concert was at the youth club Sundby Algaard. In December 1982, Lene Glumer left the band and the three of them kept playing together and on 3 March 1984, Jesper's younger brother, Jacob, joined the band at a concert at Musikcaféen in Copenhagen.

The band released their first album, Call of the Wild in 1986.

The group made their international breakthrough in 1989 with the record No Fuel Left for the Pilgrims on Warner Records, which was released on the band's fifth birthday. They achieved some airplay with the single "Sleeping My Day Away".

The current lineup is Jesper Binzer, Jacob Binzer, Stig Pedersen and Laust Sonne.

The largest concert the band played as the opening act for the Böhse Onkelz on their farewell festival on 17 June 2005, about 120,000 people on the Euro Speedway Lausitz.

== Band members ==
Jesper Binzer

- Birth: 4 September 1965
- Position: lead vocals, guitar, banjo, and backing vocals.

Binzer is from Frederiksberg like Laust Sonne. He was one of the founders of the band in 1982. He also plays drums for the band The Whiteouts and has also written a song for the Danish movie Bleeder.

Jacob Binzer

- Birth: 28 October 1966
- Position: Lead guitar, backing vocals, kazoo, piano, and keyboards.
- Nickname: Cobber

Jesper Binzer's younger brother. He is from Frederiksberg. Jacob has played in the band since 1984.

Stig Pedersen

- Birth: 18 May 1965
- Position: Bass guitar, lead vocals and backing vocals.

Stig is from Amager and used to play in a punk band called ADS and also plays in a band called Hellbetty. A notable aspect of Pedersen's bass playing is his use of almost exclusively two-stringed bass guitars; his basses often take extravagant shapes, such as an iPhone whose screen shows the audience.

Laust Sonne

- Birth: 11 December 1974
- Position: drums, backing vocals, vibraphone, keyboards, guitar, saxophone, xylophone, and bass guitar.

Sonne is from Frederiksberg. He has played in the band since 1999. He also plays in the bands Dear and Bugpowder.

Line-up history

Year	Line-up
1984–1999	Jesper Binzer – lead vocals, electric guitar; Jacob Binzer – electric guitar; Stig Pedersen – bass guitar, backing vocals; Peter Lundholm Jensen – drums
1999–present	Jesper Binzer – lead vocals, electric guitar; Jacob Binzer – electric guitar; Stig Pedersen – bass guitar, backing vocals; Laust Sonne – drums, backing vocals

== Discography ==
=== Albums ===
Studio albums

List of studio albums, with selected chart positions
Title	Details	Peak chart positions		
Title	Details	DEN	AUS	US
Call of the Wild	Released: 4 February 1986; Label: Mega; Formats: LP, CD	—	—	—
D.A.D. Draws a Circle	Released: 16 June 1987; Label: Mega; Formats: LP, CD	—	—	—
No Fuel Left for the Pilgrims	Released: 3 March 1989; Label: Medley, Warner Bros.; Formats: LP, CD, cassette	—	29	116
Riskin' It All	Released: 10 October 1991; Label: Medley, Warner Bros.; Formats: LP, CD, cassette	—	80	—
Helpyourselfish	Released: 1 March 1995; Label: Medley; Formats: CD	—	—	—
Simpatico	Released: 6 November 1997; Label: Medley; Formats: CD	—	—	—
Everything Glows	Released: 13 April 2000; Label: Medley; Formats: CD	24	—	—
Soft Dogs	Released: 20 February 2002; Label: Medley; Formats: CD	1	—	—
Scare Yourself	Released: 23 May 2005; Label: EMI; Formats: CD, LP	1	—	—
Monster Philosophy	Released: 10 November 2008; Label: EMI; Formats: CD, LP	1	—	—
DIC·NII·LAN·DAFT·ERD·ARK	Released: 11 November 2011; Label: Mermaid; Formats: CD, LP	2	—	—
A Prayer for the Loud	Released: 31 May 2019; Label: Mermaid; Formats: CD, LP	1	—	—
Speed of Darkness	Released: 4 October 2024; Label: AFM; Formats: CD, LP	3	—	—

Live albums

List of live albums, with selected chart positions
Title	Details	Peak chart positions
Title	Details	DEN
Osaka After Dark	Released: 23 January 1990; Label: Warner Bros.; Formats: CD	—
Psychopatico	Released: 20 November 1998; Label: Medley; Formats: CD	—
Scare Yourself Alive	Released: 1 May 2006; Label: EMI; Formats: CD, LP	4
Live from the Arena	Released: 18 April 2025; Label: Warner Music Denmark; Formats: 2×CD, 4×LP	1

Compilation albums

List of compilation albums, with selected chart positions
Title	Details	Peak chart positions
Title	Details	DEN
D.A.D. Special	Released: 1 December 1989; Label: Mega; Formats: CD, LP	—
Good Clean Family Entertainment You Can Trust	Released: 9 November 1995; Label: Medley; Formats: CD	—
The Early Years	Released: 13 November 2000; Label: Medley; Formats: CD	40
VA – Ungdomshuset	Released: 4 March 2005; Label: Ungdomshuset; Formats: CD	—
The Overmuch Box	Released: 16 November 2009; Label: EMI; Formats: CD	14
Behind the Seen	Released: 16 November 2009; Label: EMI; Formats: LP	—
Disn30land Af30r D30k	Released: January 2014; Label: Mermaid; Formats: CD, LP	2
Forty Love: Greatest Hits	Released: March 2024; Label: Warner; Formats: CD, LP	6

Extended plays

List of extended plays
Title	Details
Standin' On the Never Never	Released: 28 May 1985; Label: Mega; Formats: 12-inch

=== Singles ===
Title	Year	Peak chart positions		Album
Title	Year	DEN	AUS	Album
"Sleeping My Day Away"	1989	—	63	No Fuel Left for the Pilgrims
"Girl Nation"	1990	—	52	No Fuel Left for the Pilgrims
"Jihad"	1990	—	89	No Fuel Left for the Pilgrims
"Bad Craziness"	1991	—	86	Riskin' It All
"I Want What She's Got"	2011	36	—	DIC.NII.LAN.DAFT.ERD.ARK

== Tours ==
- Scare Yourself Alive Tour (2005–2006)
- D-A-D Tour 2007 (2007)
- D-A-D Tour 2008 (2008)
- Monster Philosophy Tour (2009)
- D-A-D Tour 2010 (2010)
- D-A-D Tour 2011 (2011)
- Fast On Wheels Tour (2012)
- D-A-D Tour 2013 (2013)
- D-A-D Tour 2015 (2015)
- D-A-D 35th Anniversary Greatest Hits Tour (2022)
- D-A-D 40th Anniversary World Tour (2025)

== See also ==
- List of glam metal bands and artists
