= Jutland cattle =

Breed of cattle

Jutland cattle are a rare Danish breed of cattle used in both dairy and beef production. Bred from the indigenous cattle of Jutland the breed could be light grey, dark grey or black pied with upward curving horns. The first herdbook published in 1881 had a small dairy type and a larger beef type. The dairy cows were small, averaging 120 cm high and weighing 350 kg, producing between 800 and 1000 kg of milk per lactation.

In the first half of the 20th century the breed was extensively crossed with Dutch black and white cattle to boost milk production. By 1949 Dutch cattle and crosses were accepted into the herdbook and the name was changed to Danish Black and White Cattle. In 1955 the last purebred young bull was exhibited. Since 1987 the Jutland breed has been reconstructed using unregistered stock from farms which had avoided crossing their cattle with Dutch cattle. The modern cows are typically 132 cm tall at the withers and weigh 550 kg, while bulls are typically 145 cm tall and weigh 1000 kg. In 2004 there were 49 breeders with a total of 121 cows and 11 bulls. Breeders receive financial support from the Danish government to keep the breed.
