= Riskin' It All =

Studio album by D-A-D
- Released: 10 October 1991
- Recorded: Spring 1991
- Studio: Medley Studio, Copenhagen; Sweet Silence Studios, Copenhagen; Easy Sound Studio, Copenhagen
- Genre: Hard rock
- Length: 36:45
- Label: Medley (Denmark); Warner Bros. (international)
- Producer: Nikolaj Foss; D.A.D.; Lars Overgaard

D-A-D chronology
No Fuel Left for the Pilgrims (1989)	Riskin' It All (1991)	Helpyourselfish (1995)

Professional ratings
Review scores
Source	Rating
AllMusic	2.5/5 stars

Riskin' It All is the fourth studio album by Danish rock band D-A-D, released on 10 October 1991 in Denmark by Medley Records and internationally in early 1992 by Warner Bros. The international edition includes a new rendition of the band's classic "I Won't Cut My Hair" as a bonus track.

Riskin' It All sold 450,000 copies worldwide, including 130,000 in Denmark. In the US, the album sold 60,000 copies. As a result, Warner Bros. decided not to extend their international contract with the band.

== Critical reception ==
Billboard's reviewer left moderately positive review on this album. As per him the "biggest" problem of Riskin' It All were "Berlitz School lyrics, which range from silly to maddeningly dopey".

== Awards ==
At the 1992 Danish Music Awards, the album won the Best Heavy Rock Album of the Year award, and the music video for "Bad Craziness" won the Best Danish Music Video of the Year award. Furthermore, producer Nikolaj Foss won the Best Danish Producer of the Year award for Riskin' It All.

At the 1991 GAFFA Awards, the album received awards for Album of the Year, Band of the Year and Music Video of the Year ("Bad Craziness").

== Track listing ==
All songs written by D-A-D

1. "Bad Craziness" – 3:16
2. "D*Law" – 3:48
3. "Day of Wrong Moves" – 3:58
4. "Rock 'n' Rock Radar" – 2:36
5. "I Won't Cut My Hair" – 5:24 bonus on German version
6. "Down That Dusty 3'rd World Road" – 4:23
7. "Makin' Fun of Money" – 4:08
8. "Grow or Pay" – 4:59
9. "Smart Boy Can't Tell Ya'" – 3:15
10. "Riskin' It All" – 2:37
11. "Laugh 'n' a ½" – 3:29

== Personnel ==
Adapted from the album's liner notes.

Disneyland After Dark

- Jesper Binzer – vocals, guitar
- Stig Pedersen – bass, vocals
- Jacob Binzer – guitar, kazoo, piano, vocals
- Peter L. Jensen – drums

Technical

- Nick Foss – producer
- D-A-D – producer, cover, inner sleeve
- Lars Overgaard – co-producer, engineer
- Anders Bonde – assistant engineer
- Thomas Breckling – assistant engineer
- Chris Lord-Alge – mixing, mastering
- Erwin Musper – mixing assistant
- Steve Marcusson – mastering
- Man Overboard – cover, inner sleeve
- Torleif Hoppe – cover, inner sleeve
- Per Kruse – cover photography

== Charts ==
Chart (1991–1992)	Peak position
Australian Albums (ARIA Charts)	80
Danish Albums (Hitlisten)	1
Finnish Albums (The Official Finnish Charts)	17
Norwegian Albums (VG-lista)	14
Swedish Albums (Sverigetopplistan)	17

== Certifications ==
Region	Certification	Certified units/sales
Denmark (IFPI Danmark)	Gold	10,000^{‡}
^{‡} Sales+streaming figures based on certification alone.
