= Everything Glows =

Studio album by D-A-D
- Released: 13 April 2000
- Genre: Rock, Hard Rock
- Label: Medley
- Producer: Nick Foss

D-A-D chronology
Nattens Engel (1998)	Everything Glows (2000)	The Early Years (2000)

Professional ratings
Review scores
Source	Rating
AllMusic	2.5/5 stars

Everything Glows was the seventh album released by Danish rock band D-A-D. The album was released on 13 April 2000, and was the first album with new drummer Laust Sonne. With the release of this album the band also changed the spelling of the band from D:A:D to the current D-A-D.

== Track listing ==
1. "Everything Glows" – 3:44
2. "Nineteenhundredandyesterday" – 4:59
3. "The Road Below Me" – 3:37
4. "Something Good" – 4:19
5. "Sunstar" – 4:24
6. "Evil Twin" – 3:07
7. "Candybar" – 4:29
8. "A Kiss Between the Legs" – 4:32
9. "I'm Not the Same" – 3:29
10. "Summer Me Soon" – 3:30
11. "As Common As" – 4:23
12. "Last Mango in Paris" (Japan only bonus track)
13. "I'm a Little Cloud" (Japan + UK only bonus track)

== Charts ==
Chart (2000)	Peak position
Danish Albums (Hitlisten)	5
Finnish Albums (The Official Finnish Charts)	19
Swedish Albums (Sverigetopplistan)	30
