= På Slaget 12 =

Danish band

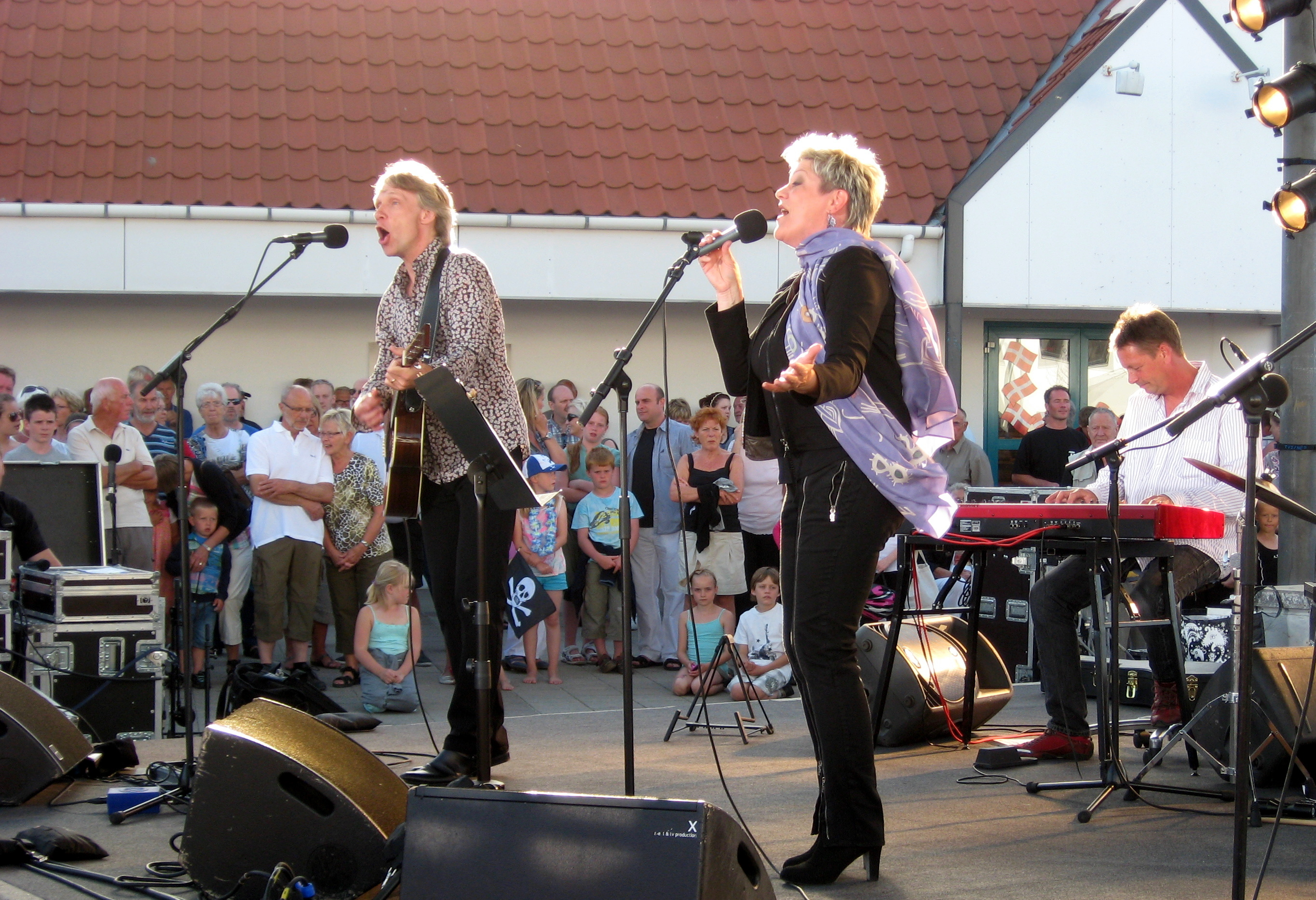
- Concert in Blokhus, 2011

Background information
- Years active: 1986-
- Members: Ann-Mette Elten; Niels Kirkegaard; Ebbe Ravn; Hans Fagt; Joachim Ussing
- Website: paaslaget12.dk

På Slaget 12 (also known as PS12) is a Danish pop and rock band which mainly consists of singer Ann-Mette Elten and guitarist Niels Kirkegård. På Slaget 12 was formed as a band in 1984 under the name Kvartalsband af Elten, Kirkegård, keyboardspiller Søren Møller, bassist Mogens Lodahl, og trommeslager Mats Madsen (English: Quarter band by Elten, Kirkegård, keyboardist Søren Møller, bassist Mogens Lodahl, and drummer Mats Madsen). The band published their debut album in 1986 in which the song Hjem til Århus became a major hit.

The debut album published in 1986 sold 61.000 copies and it was followed up by a number of other successful albums in the 1980s. The album Ro mit hjerte from 1997 became a flop that only sold 1800 copies. In February 2002 På Slaget 12 got a commercial comeback with the album Let's Danceconsisting of hits from the 1950s and 1960s. The album became a major success that sold 115.000 copies. In November 2002 Let's Dance 2 was published followed by Let's Dance 3 in June 2003. The group had published 3 albums in a year and a half. In 2004 the fourth and last Let's Dance-albums was published and the series sold a total of 350.000 copies. The success with Let's Dance carried with it many concerts and performances and the band has since 2002 given c. 80 concert per year.

== Discography ==
=== Studio albums ===
- På Slaget 12 (1986)
- Tror du virk'lig livet bli'r genudsendt? (1987)
- Kærlighed ved sidste blik (1989)
- Sandheden, baby (1991)
- Sidst i september (1992)
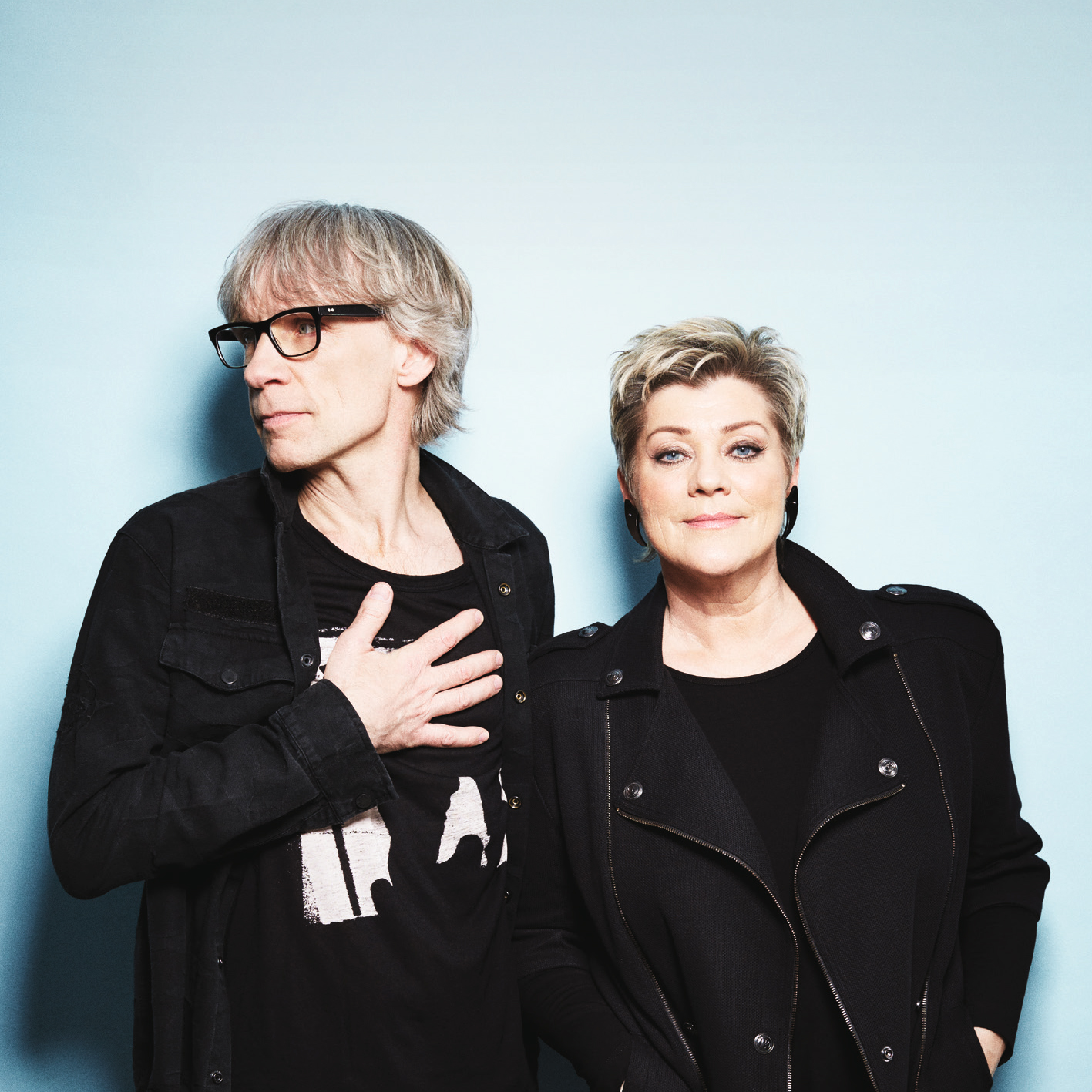
- Til tiden (1995)
- Ro mit hjerte (1997)
- Let's Dance (2002)
- Let's Dance 2 (2002)
- Let's Dance 3 (2003)
- På Slaget 12 spiller På Slaget 12 (2004)
- Let's Dance 4 (2006)
- Hjerterne fri (2015)

=== Collections ===
- Hjem til Århus - 18 Hits (1993)
- De Allerbedste (1996)
- Let's Dance Complete (2008)
- Hjem til Århus og alle de andre - de 35 største danske sange (2011)
