= Scare Yourself =

Studio album by D-A-D
- Released: 23 May 2005
- Genre: Rock, hard rock
- Length: 38:53
- Label: EMI
- Producer: D-A-D

D-A-D chronology
Soft Dogs (2002)	Scare Yourself (2005)	Scare Yourself Alive (2006)

Professional ratings
Review scores
Source	Rating
Gaffa	3/6 stars

Scare Yourself is the ninth album by Danish rock band D-A-D. The album was released on 23 May 2005.

== Track listing ==
1. "Lawrence of Suburbia" - 4:31
2. "A Good Day (To Give It Up)" - 3:09
3. "Scare Yourself" - 3:36
4. "No Hero" - 3:08
5. "Hey Now" - 3:44
6. "Camping in Scandinavia" - 3:52
7. "Unexplained" - 3:26
8. "Little Addict" - 3:39
9. "Dirty Fairytale" - 2:45
10. "Allright" - 4:05
11. "Last Chance to Change" - 3:31
12. "You Filled My Head" (Bonus Track)*
- Only found as a bonus track in regions outside Scandinavia.

== Charts ==
Chart (2005)	Peak position
Danish Albums (Hitlisten)	1
Finnish Albums (Suomen virallinen lista)	21
Swedish Albums (Sverigetopplistan)	42

== Certifications ==
Certifications for Scare Yourself
Region	Certification	Certified units/sales
Denmark (IFPI Danmark)	Platinum	40,000^{^}
^{^} Shipments figures based on certification alone.
