= Standin' on the Never Never =

EP by D-A-D
- Released: 28 May 1985
- Recorded: 15–19 April 1985
- Studio: Studio 39, Copenhagen
- Genre: Cowpunk
- Length: 10:18
- Label: Mega
- Producer: Frank Marstokk

D-A-D chronology
Standin' on the Never Never (1985)	Call of the Wild (1986)

Standin' on the Never Never was the first release by Danish rock band D-A-D, then known as Disneyland After Dark. The EP was released on 28 May 1985 on Mega Records.
Mega was satisfied with the result and continued the collaboration, which resulted in Call of the Wild, the first full-length album by D-A-D.

== Track listing ==
All tracks are written by Disneyland After Dark

Side one
No.	Title	Length
1.	"Up, Up Over the Mountain Top"	2:19
2.	"Marlboro Man"	2:49

Side two
No.	Title	Length
1.	"Never Never (Indian Love)"	5:10

== Personnel ==
Adapted from the EP's liner notes.

Disneyland After Dark

- Jesper Binzer – vocals, guitar, backing vocals
- Stig Pedersen – vocals, bass, backing vocals
- Jacob Binzer – guitar, keyboards, backing vocals
- Peter Lundholm – drums

Technical

- Frank Marstokk – producer
- Jørgen Bo – engineer
- Jönsson Design – cover art
- Robin Skjoldborg – photography
