= Soft Dogs =

Studio album by D-A-D
- Released: 20 February 2002
- Genre: Rock, hard rock
- Label: EMI
- Producer: Nick Foss

D-A-D chronology
| The Early Years (2000) | Soft Dogs (2002) | Scare Yourself (2005) |

Professional ratings
Review scores
| Source | Rating |
|---|---|
| Gaffa | 6/6 stars |

Soft Dogs is an album by Danish rock group D-A-D. The album was released on 20 February 2002. The album gained many favorable reviews, including six out of six stars by Danish music magazine Gaffa.

== Track listing ==
1. Soft Dogs - 4:30
2. What's the Matter? - 4:57
3. The Truth About You - 4:12
4. Golden Way - 4:37
5. So What? - 4:40
6. Between You and Me - 3:22
7. Out There - 3:30
8. It Changes Everything - 3:31
9. Un Frappe Sur la Tête - 2:59
10. Blue All Over - 4:17
11. Hey Little Airplane - 3:19
12. Human Kind - 4:02

To date the album has sold 65,000+ copies in Denmark.

== Charts ==
| Chart (2002) | Peak position |
|---|---|
| Danish Albums (Hitlisten) | 1 |
| Swedish Albums (Sverigetopplistan) | 54 |
