= D.A.D. Draws a Circle =

Studio album by D-A-D
- Released: 16 June 1987
- Recorded: November–December 1986
- Studio: Mega Studios, Copenhagen
- Genre: Cowpunk, hard rock
- Length: 37:26
- Label: Mega
- Producer: Mark Dearnley

D-A-D chronology
Call of the Wild (1986)	D.A.D. Draws a Circle (1987)	No Fuel Left for the Pilgrims (1989)

Singles from D.A.D. Draws a Circle
- 1. "Isn't That Wild" Released: 1987; 2. "A Horse with No Name" Released: 1987

Professional ratings
Review scores
Source	Rating
AllMusic	2.5/5 stars

D.A.D. Draws a Circle is the second studio album by Danish rock band D-A-D, at the time known as Disneyland After Dark. It was released on 16 June 1987 by Mega Records. The album received fairly positive reviews and sold 30,000 copies in Denmark.

The album was produced by Englishman Mark Dearnley, who had engineered for acts like AC/DC, Motörhead, the Beat and Haircut One Hundred. The album title has a dual meaning: it refers to making an album and, also, signals that the band had come full circle while covering different musical styles such as hard rock, punk, country, and gospel.

The album contains D-A-D's first and only cover version, "A Horse with No Name" by America, at the request of producer Mark Dearnley.

== Track listing ==
All tracks are written by Disneyland After Dark, except where noted

No.	Title	Writer(s)	Length
1.	"Isn't That Wild"		2:52
2.	"A Horse with No Name"	Dewey Bunnell	3:33
3.	"Mighty, Mighty High"		3:18
4.	"I Won't Cut My Hair"		5:52
5.	"Black Crickets"		4:12
6.	"There's a Ship"		3:13
7.	"God's Favourite"		3:55
8.	"10 Knots"		4:16
9.	"Ride My Train"		2:06
10.	"I'd Rather Live Than Die"		4:09
Total length:			37:26

CD reissue bonus tracks
No.	Title	Length
11.	"Up, Up Over the Mountain Top" (from Standin' on the Never Never EP)	2:19
12.	"Sad, Sad X-Mas" (B-side to "It's After Dark")	3:26
Total length:		43:11

== Personnel ==
Adapted from the album's liner notes, except where noted.

Disneyland After Dark

- Jesper Binzer – vocals, guitar
- Stig Pedersen – vocals, bass
- Jacob Binzer – guitar, lap steel, electric piano
- Peter L. Jensen – drums, backing vocals

Technical

- Mark Dearnley – producer, engineer, mixing
- First Floor – cover art
- Robin Skjoldborg – photography
