= No Fuel Left for the Pilgrims =

Studio album by D-A-D
- Released: 3 March 1989 (Denmark); 8 September 1989 (international)
- Recorded: Autumn 1988
- Studio: Medley Studio, Copenhagen
- Genre: Hard rock; glam metal
- Length: 40:55
- Label: Medley (Denmark); Warner Bros. (international)
- Producer: D-A-D; Nick Foss; Lars Overgaard

D-A-D chronology
| D.A.D. Draws a Circle (1987) | No Fuel Left for the Pilgrims (1989) | Riskin' It All (1991) |

Singles from No Fuel Left For The Pilgrims
- 1. "Sleeping My Day Away" Released: 1989; 2. "Girl Nation" Released: 1989; 3. "Jihad" Released: 1990 (Australia)

Alternative cover
- 1989 Danish release

Professional ratings
Review scores
| Source | Rating |
|---|---|
| AllMusic | 4.5/5 stars |

No Fuel Left for the Pilgrims is the third (and first international) studio album by Danish rock band D-A-D. The album was released on 3 March 1989 in Denmark by Medley Records and worldwide on 8 September 1989 by Warner Bros. The band was still called Disneyland After Dark on the original Danish release but changed their name to D-A-D for the international release to avoid a lawsuit from The Walt Disney Company. For the international version tracks 1, 3, 4 & 7 were remixed by Chris Lord-Alge at Image Recording in Los Angeles.

It was the band's most popular release, largely due to the inclusion of the minor hits "Rim of Hell" and "Sleeping My Day Away". The album reached #116 on the US Billboard 200 chart, while the album's first single "Sleeping My Day Away" reached #23 on Billboard's Album Rock Tracks chart and #87 on the UK Singles Chart. The album has sold 600,000 copies worldwide, including 275,000 in Denmark and 100,000 in the US.

Tracks from this album were recorded live for the Osaka After Dark EP, released the following year.

In 2019, the album was featured on Rolling Stone magazine's list of the 50 Greatest Hair Metal Albums of All Time.

== Track listing ==
All tracks are written by D-A-D.

| No. | Title | Length |
|---|---|---|
| 1. | "Sleeping My Day Away" | 4:21 |
| 2. | "Jihad" | 2:56 |
| 3. | "Point of View" | 3:58 |
| 4. | "Rim of Hell" | 4:33 |
| 5. | "ZCMI" | 2:45 |
| 6. | "True Believer" | 2:21 |
| 7. | "Girl Nation" | 3:40 |
| 8. | "Lords of the Atlas" | 3:18 |
| 9. | "Overmuch" | 3:47 |
| 10. | "Siamese Twin" | 2:41 |
| 11. | "Wild Talk" | 4:03 |
| 12. | "Ill Will" | 2:03 |

== Personnel ==
Adapted from the album's liner notes.

D-A-D

- Jesper Binzer – vocals, rhythm guitar
- Stig Pedersen – bass, backing vocals
- Jacob Binzer – lead guitar, backing vocals
- Peter L. Jensen – drums

Technical

- D-A-D – producer, mixing, arrangements
- Nick Foss – producer, mixing
- Lars Overgaard – co-producer, engineer, mixing
- Poul Bruun – mixing
- Chris Lord-Alge – remixing (tracks 1, 3, 4 & 7 on international edition)
- Jeremy Allom – engineer
- Rene Cambony – engineer
- Axel Strandberg – engineer
- Oli Poulsen – engineer
- John Kronholm – engineer
- Thomas Brekling – engineer
- Man Overboard – cover design
- Lars Colberg – cover photography
- Ulf Bjerre – cover photography

== Charts ==
| Chart (1989–1990) | Peak position |
|---|---|
| Australian Albums (ARIA) | 29 |
| New Zealand Albums (RMNZ) | 35 |
| Swedish Albums (Sverigetopplistan) | 25 |
| US Billboard 200 | 116 |

| Chart (2011) | Peak position |
|---|---|
| Finnish Albums (Suomen virallinen lista) | 38 |

== Certifications ==
| Region | Certification | Certified units/sales |
|---|---|---|
| Denmark (IFPI Danmark) | 2× Platinum | 40,000^{‡} |
^{‡} Sales+streaming figures based on certification alone.
