= Allan Olsen =

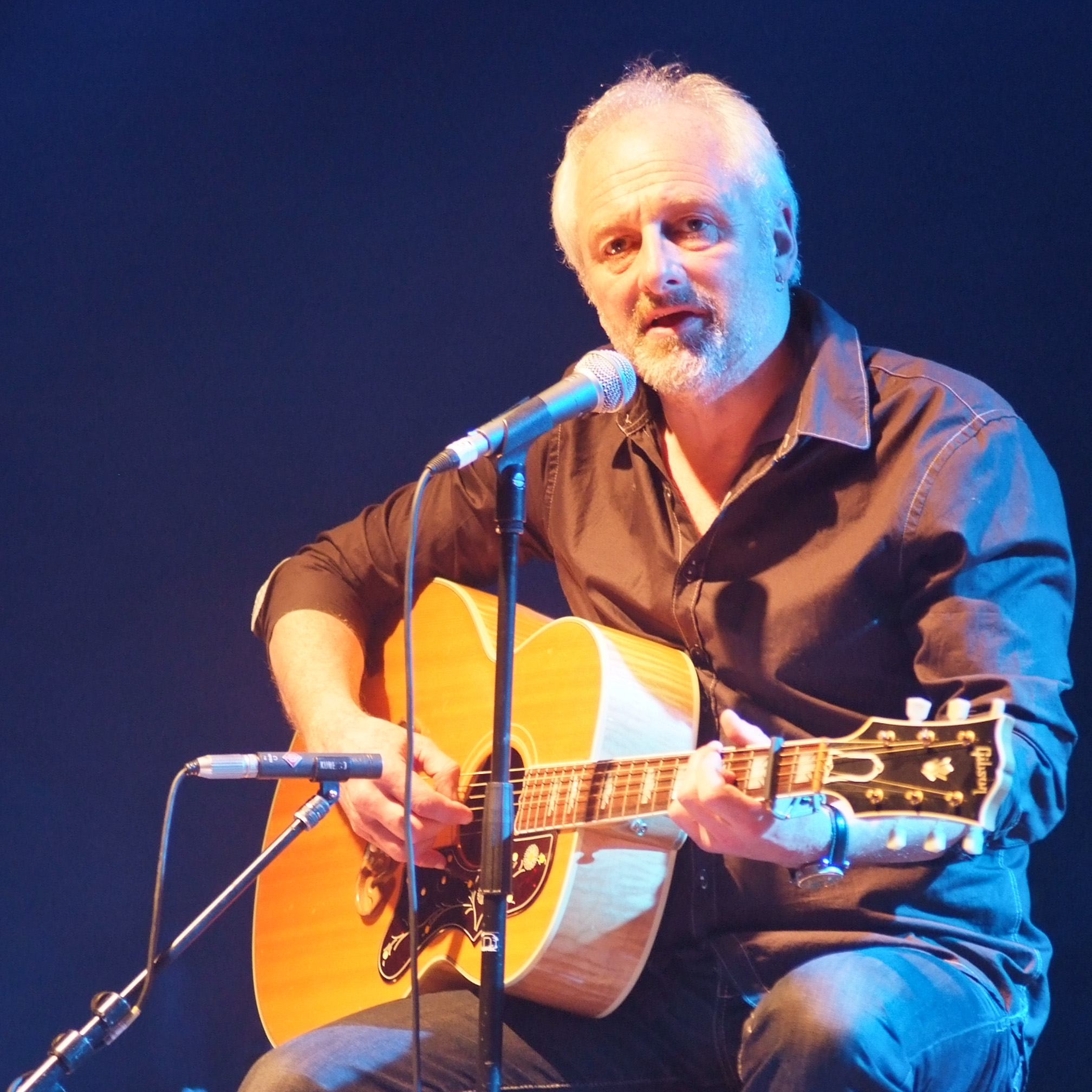
- Olsen live at the Danish Music Awards Folk 2008 in Tønder

Background information
- Born: 18 March 1956 (age 70); Grønholt, Vendsyssel
- Genres: Rock
- Occupations: musician, songwriter
- Instruments: Vocals, guitar
- Years active: 1976–present
- Member of: Dalton
- Website: allanolsen.dk

Allan Olsen (born 18 March 1956) is a Danish folkrock musician and singer-songwriter. His famous live performances combine his songs with satirical anecdotes. The music is delivered either acoustically or with a rock band.

From 1983 to 1992 he was part of Dalton, a supergroup trio made of Olsen, Lars Lilholt and Johnny Madsen.

== Career ==
Allan Olsen was born in Grønholt, Vendsyssel, and grew up enjoying the musical styles of The Who, The Rolling Stones and The Kinks a.m.. Olsen picked up a guitar himself in the 1970s, and hit the road – initially as a low key performer, often playing in the outskirts of Denmark and with a style inspired by Bob Dylan, Bert Jansch and Randy Newman.

In 1989, the then 33-year-old performer signed his first record contract, with an obligation to record a minimum of three albums within the next five years. The debut album "Norlan" hits the style of British and American rock, combined with a lyrical talent for storytelling that sparsely used dialect (north Jutlandic). The album is a success. The following two albums and intense touring consolidate his name and a large loyal following, especially in West Denmark.

In the autumn of 1993 Allan Olsen spends time in Ireland in search of musicians to play with him on his next album. "Jern" (i.e. "Iron") is released in the spring of 1996 and receives ovations from the musical press and the album is rewarded with a Danish Grammy (later Danish Music Award). The album flavours Olsens folkrock style with Irish instruments as does 1998's "Sange for Rygere" (i.e. "Songs for Smokers").

Later albums have seen Olsen increasingly experimenting with musical styles and lyrical escapades – but also maintaining artistic focus and critical integrity and still beholding his original inspiration in Dylanesque storytelling – Jansch' poetic nerve and Newmans' wit and eccentricism. His album in 2007's Multo Importanto is a focused affair that has been praised by old as well as newer fans. In 2013 he released the album Jøwt, an album sung in dialect.

== In band Dalton ==
He was also part of a Danish supergroup named Dalton made up of Olsen in addition to Lars Lilholt and Johnny Madsen. It was formed in 1983 but had to wait till 1992 for their first album. They reunited in 2005 to work on new materials and had a comeback in 2010 for a grand tour.

== Discography ==
=== Albums ===
Solo

Year	Album	Peak position	Certification
Year	Album	DK	Certification
1989	Norlan		
1990	Gajo		
1992	Pindsvin i Pigsko		
1996	Jern		
1998	Sange For Rygere		
2000	Onomatopoeitikon		
2004	Gæst	1	
2007	Multo Importante	1	
2013	Jøwt	1	Gold
2017	Hudsult	2	

Live albums

Year	Album	Peak position	Certification
Year	Album	DK	Certification
2002	Solo	7	
2008	Allan Olsen & Band – Vol. 1	9	
2009	Solo – Vol. 2	12	
2013	D'Damer & Allan Olsen	16	

In Dalton

- 1992: Dalton
- 2009: Tyve Ti
- 2010: Var Her (Live 2 CDs +DVD) (with Johnny Madsen and Lars Lilholt)

== DVDs ==
- 2008: Allan Olsen & Band – Vol. 1 (also album CD)
- 2009: Solo live – Vol. 2, (also album CD)
