= Saybia =

Danish rock band

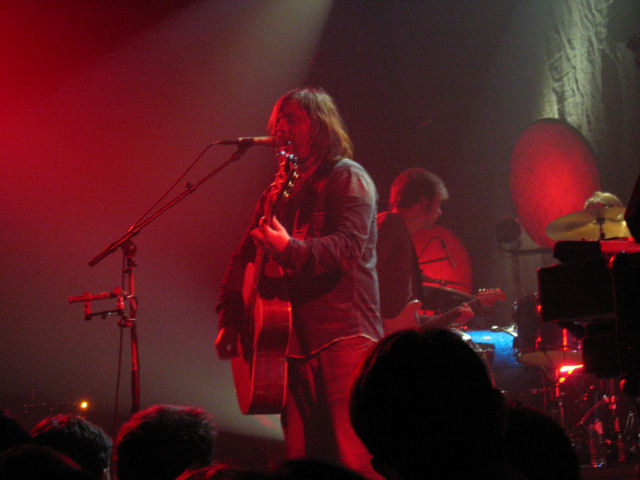

Background information
- Origin: Nyborg, Denmark
- Genres: Rock
- Years active: 1993–2008, 2010–present
- Label: EMI
- Members: Søren Huss; Jeppe Langebek Knudsen; Palle Sørensen; Kasper Rasmussen; Jess Jensen
- Past members: Sebastian Sandstrøm; Thomas Dahl

Saybia is a Danish rock band formed in Nyborg in 1993.

== History ==
From 1998 to 2000 they privately recorded three EPs (which they sold at their concerts) before signing to EMI in the spring of 2001. In the summer EMI released the 6 track EP "Saybia". In September 2001 the band went to Sweden to record their debut album The Second You Sleep. This album was recorded in "The Blue Room" in Gävle (Sweden), and was produced by Saybia and Swedish producer Andreas Ahlenius. The album was mixed at Medley Studios, Copenhagen DK. After the release on 21 January 2002, the band went on the road, touring Scandinavia and most of Northern Europe until Sep 2003. In 2003 Saybia released a Live-EP recorded 16 February at the venue "013" in Tilburg, NL. In autumn 2003, the band bought a house south of Copenhagen, and turned it into a rehearsal/recording studio. Saybia spent the winter recording demos for the next record These are the days. In January 2004 the band booked studio-time in "Sandkvie Studio", Visby on the Swedish island, Gotland, again together with producer Andreas Ahlenius. The album was mixed by Tchad Blake at "Real World Studios" GB. These Are the Days was released September 2004. In August 2007 Saybia released their 3rd studio album Eyes on the Highway, which was recorded in the band's own studio "A Kind of Eden Studio", this time with producer Rune Nissen Petersen. The album was mixed by Producer Ryan Hewitt at "The Pass", Hollywood. A new album, No Sound From the Outside was released in 2015.

== Band members ==
- Søren Huss (born 6 September 1975) – vocals, acoustic guitar
- Jeppe Langebek Knudsen (born 17 August 1976) – bass
- Palle Sørensen (born 8 September 1974) – drums
- Kasper Rasmussen – guitar
- Jess Jensen (born 8 March 1977) – keyboards

=== Former members ===
- Sebastian Sandstrøm — guitar (1998—?)
- Thomas Dahl — guitar (1993—1998)

== Discography ==
=== Albums ===
Year	Album	Peak position				Certification
Year	Album	DEN	NED	NOR	SWI	Certification
2002	The Second You Sleep	1	38	1	65	
2004	These Are the Days	1	8	3	13	
2007	Eyes on the Highway	1	6	17	15	
2015	No Sound from the Outside	7	9	-	81	

=== EPs ===
Year	Album	Peak position	Certification
Year	Album	DEN	Certification
1996	Saybia	–	
1997	Saybia '97	–	
1998	Dawn of a New Life	–	
1999	Chapter 2	–	
2000	Chapter 3	–	
2001	Saybia	17	
2003	Live	–	

=== Singles ===
Charting singles

Year	Single	Peak position	Certification	Album
Year	Single	DEN	Certification	Album
2004	"I Surrender"	15		These Are the Days
2007	"Angel"	30		Eyes on the Highway

Other songs

- 2002: "The Day After Tomorrow"
- 2002: "The Second You Sleep"
- 2002: "In Spite Of"
- 2004: "Brilliant Sky"
- 2004: "Bend the Rules"
- 2005: "Guardian Angel"

== In other media ==
- Veronica Mars – "Brilliant Sky" was featured in episode 1x11, "Silence of the Lamb".

== Awards ==
In 2004 Saybia won an EBBA Award. Every year the European Border Breakers Awards (EBBA) recognize the success of ten emerging artists or groups who reached audiences outside their own countries with their first internationally released album in the past year.
