= Call of the Wild (D-A-D album) =

Studio album by D-A-D
- Released: 4 February 1986
- Recorded: Autumn 1985
- Studios: Studio 39, Copenhagen; Elsound, Copenhagen; Custom Sound Lab, Copenhagen
- Genres: Hard rock, cowpunk
- Length: 35:23
- Label: Mega
- Producer: Frank Marstokk

D-A-D chronology
Standin' on the Never Never (1985)	Call of the Wild (1986)	D.A.D. Draws a Circle (1987)

Professional ratings
Review scores
Source	Rating
AllMusic	2.5/5 stars

Call of the Wild is the first studio album by Danish rock band D-A-D, at the time known as Disneyland After Dark. The album was released on 4 February 1986 by Mega Records.
The album has been received with mixed reviews. The genre of the album is more country than the hard rock of their later albums. The two tracks "Marlboro Man" and "It's After Dark" are sometimes still played at their concerts, and can also be found on some of their live albums. The album was produced by Norwegian-born Frank Marstokk, a musician and producer who was A&R at Mega Records.

== Track listing ==
All tracks are written by Disneyland After Dark.

No.	Title	Length
1.	"Land of Their Choice"	1:10
2.	"Call of the Wild"	3:42
3.	"Riding With Sue"	3:01
4.	"Marlboro Man"	2:53
5.	"Counting the Cattle"	1:55
6.	"Jackie O'"	2:50
7.	"Trucker"	5:09
8.	"Rock River"	2:42
9.	"Jonnie"	4:58
10.	"Son of a Gun"	3:13
11.	"It's After Dark"	3:50
Total length:		35:23

CD bonus track
No.	Title	Length
12.	"Never Never" (from Standin' on the Never Never EP)	5:10
Total length:		40:33

== Personnel ==
Adapted from the album's liner notes.

Disneyland After Dark

- Jesper Binzer – vocals, guitar, banjo
- Stig Pedersen – vocals, bass
- Jacob Binzer – guitar, keyboards
- Peter Lundholm – drums, percussion

Additional musicians

- The Texas Horns – horns on "Jonnie"
- The Rock River Gals – backing vocals on "Rock River"

Technical

- Frank Marstokk – producer, arrangements
- Jørgen Bo – engineer
- Mogens Bjergby – engineer
- Nis Bøgvad – engineer
- Disneyland After Dark – arrangements, cover concept, inner sleeve
- Ida Balslev Olesen – cover design
- Jan Harritshøj – photography (front cover)
- Robin Skjoldborg – photography (back cover, inner sleeve)
- Torleif Hoppe – photography (inner sleeve)
- Finn Olufsen – photography (inner sleeve)
