= Simpatico (D-A-D album) =

Studio album by D-A-D
- Released: 6 November 1997
- Genre: Rock, hard rock
- Length: 45:54
- Label: Medley
- Producer: Nick Foss & D:A:D

D-A-D chronology
De Største Helte (1996)	Simpatico (1997)	Psychopatico (1998)

Professional ratings
Review scores
Source	Rating
Allmusic	link
Gaffa	4/6 stars

Simpatico is an album by Danish rock band D-A-D. The album was released on 6 November 1997 to mixed reviews. It is the last studio album with drummer Peter Lundholm Jensen.

== Track listing ==
1. "Empty Heads" – 4:20
2. "Simpatico" – 3:12
3. "Home Alone 4" – 3:45
4. "Cloudy Hours" – 3:59
5. "Hate to Say I Told You So" – 3:19
6. "No One Answers" – 3:03
7. "Mad Days" – 4:11
8. "Don't Tell Me Anything" – 3:45
9. "You Do What I've Just Done" – 4:19
10. "Life Right Now" – 4:08
11. "Now or Forever" – 3:41
12. "A Hand Without Strength" – 4:12
13. "Favours" (Japan only bonus track)

To date the album has sold 118,000+ copies in Denmark.

== Charts ==
Chart (1997)	Peak position
Finnish Albums (The Official Finnish Charts)	26

Chart performance for Simpatico
Chart (2021)	Peak position
Swedish Vinyl Albums (Sverigetopplistan)	8
