= Edel-Mega Records =

Danish record company

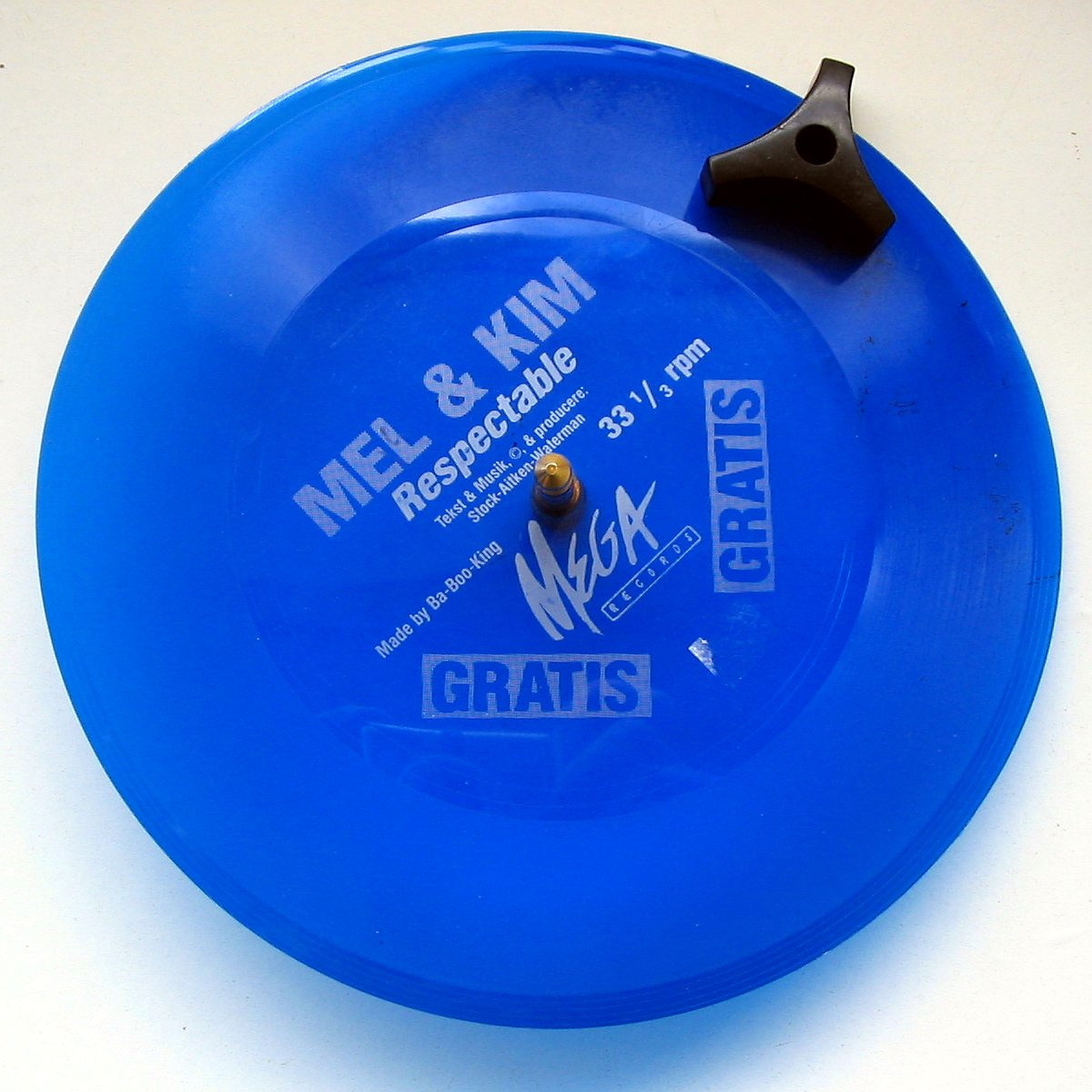
A single released by MEGA Records

Mega Records was a Danish record label established in 1983. It was renamed Edel-Mega Records when it was acquired by Edel Music in 2001. The catalogue of Mega Records is now managed by Playground Music Scandinavia, which was spun off from Edel in 2010.

Their most internationally successful artist is the Swedish pop group Ace of Base, who have sold over 30 million records worldwide to date. Nicki French also released a single under their label.

The name Mega Records, Denmark, which still appears on American releases of Ace of Base's albums, now refers to an in-name-only unit of Playground Music Scandinavia that licenses this part of its catalog to Sony Music, the owner of Arista Records and a successor to Bertelsmann Music Group.

== See also ==
- List of record labels
