= Ace of Base discography =

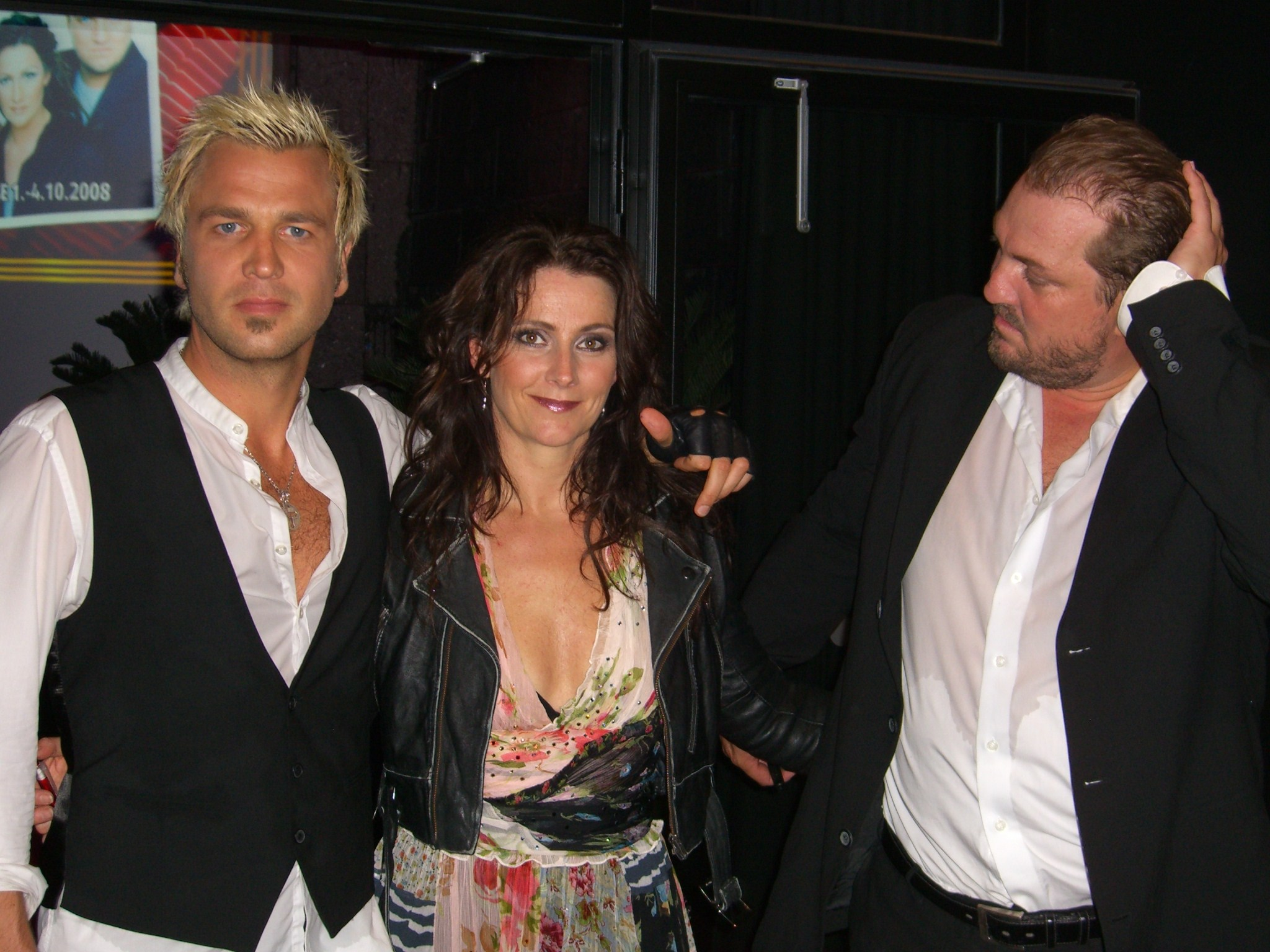
- Ace of Base in 2008
- Studio albums: 5
- Compilation albums: 9
- Box sets: 5
- EPs: 4
- Singles: 25
- Music videos: 24

Ace of Base is the third best-selling group from Sweden after ABBA and Roxette with over 30 million records sold worldwide. To date, they have released 5 studio albums and 25 singles.

== Albums ==
=== Studio albums ===
Title	Album details	Peak chart positions										Certifications
Title	Album details	SWE	AUS	AUT	CAN	DEN	FIN	GER	SWI	UK	US	Certifications
Happy Nation	Released: 2 November 1992; Label: Mega Records / PolyGram; Formats: LP, CS, CD	3	9	3	—	1	2	1	2	1	—	AUS: Platinum; AUT: Platinum; FIN: Gold; GER: 3× Platinum; SWI: Platinum; UK: 2× Platinum
The Bridge	Released: 30 October 1995; Label: Mega Records / PolyGram / Arista; Formats: LP, CS, CD	1	46	10	9	5	2	8	4	66	29	SWE: Gold; CAN: 2× Platinum; FIN: Platinum; GER: Gold; SWI: Platinum; US: Platinum
Flowers (worldwide) / Cruel Summer (North America)	Released: 15 June 1998; Label: Mega Records / PolyGram / Arista; Formats: LP, CS, CD	5	—	15	23	6	2	3	1	15	101	CAN: Gold; SWI: Gold; UK: Silver
Da Capo	Released: 30 September 2002; Label: Edel-Mega Records / Universal Music; Formats: CS, CD	25	—	61	—	21	—	48	23	—	—	
The Golden Ratio	Released: 24 September 2010; Label: Universal; Formats: CD, digital download	—	—	—	—	—	—	20	100	—	—	
"—" denotes items that did not chart or were not released in that territory.

=== Reissued albums ===
Title	Album details	Peak chart positions		Certifications
Title	Album details	CAN	US	Certifications
The Sign	Released: 23 November 1993; Label: Arista; Formats: LP, CS, CD	1	1	RIAA: 9× Platinum; MC: Diamond

=== Compilation albums ===
Title	Album details	Peak chart positions								
Title	Album details	SWE	AUT	DEN	FIN	FRA	GER	NOR	SWI	UK
Singles of the 90s	Released: 15 November 1999; Label: Edel-Mega	36	32	16	29	25	21	35	14	62
Greatest Hits	Released: 18 April 2000 (North America); Label: Arista	—	—	—	—	—	—	—	—	—
The Collection/All That She Wants	Released: 21 October 2002 (Europe); Label: Universal Music	—	—	—	—	—	—	—	—	—
Platinum & Gold Collection	Released: 6 May 2003 (North America); Label: Arista	—	—	16	—	—	—	—	—	—
The Hits	Released: 2004 (South Africa); Label: Gallo	—	—	—	—	—	—	—	—	—
Platinum & Gold	Released: 10 March 2010 (Scandinavia); Label: Warner	—	—	26	—	—	—	6	—	—
Hidden Gems	Released: 6 March 2015; Label: Playground	—	—	—	—	—	—	—	—	—
Gold	Released: 11 October 2019; Label: Crimson Productions	—	—	—	—	—	—	—	—	59
Hidden Gems Vol. 2	Released: 28 August 2020; Label: Playground Music	—	—	—	—	—	—	—	—	—
"—" denotes items that did not chart or were not released in that territory.

=== Box sets ===
Title	Album details
Ace of Base – Exclusive Fan Edition	Released: 30 June 2003; Label: Polydor; Format: CD/DVD
The Ultimate Collection	Released: 19 July 2005; Label: Universal Music; Format: CD
Greatest Hits	Released: 14 November 2008; Label: Mega/Playground; Format: CD/DVD
All That She Wants: The Classic Collection	Released: 3 July 2020; Label: Demon Records; Format: LP, CD/DVD
Beautiful Life: The Singles	Released: 28 April 2023; Label: Demon Records; Format: CD, digital download

== Extended plays ==
Title	Extended play details	Peak chart positions
Title	Extended play details	GER
Cruel Summer (Rico Bernasconi vs Ace of Base)	Released: 5 September 2009; Label: Warner; Formats: LP, CD, digital download	69
All That She Wants (Remixed)	Released: 7 July 2014; Label: Playground; Formats: Digital download	—
"—" denotes items that did not chart or were not released in that territory.

== Singles ==
Year	Title	Peak chart positions										Certifications	Album
Year	Title	SWE	AUS	AUT	CAN	DEN	FIN	GER	SWI	UK	US	Certifications	Album
1992	"Wheel of Fortune"	39	—	6	—	2	15	4	5	20	—	GER: Gold	Happy Nation/The Sign
1992	"All That She Wants"	3	1	1	1	1	4	1	1	1	2	AUS: 2× Platinum; AUT: Gold; GER: 3× Gold; UK: Platinum; US: Platinum	Happy Nation/The Sign
1993	"Happy Nation"	4	80	6	—	1	1	7	23	40	—	GER: Gold	Happy Nation/The Sign
1993	"Waiting for Magic"	19	—	—	—	2	5	—	—	—	—		Happy Nation/The Sign
1993	"The Sign"	2	1	3	1	1	1	1	4	2	1	AUS: Platinum; AUT: Gold; GER: Platinum; UK: Platinum; US: Platinum	Happy Nation/The Sign
1994	"Don't Turn Around"	11	19	8	1	4	3	6	14	5	4	GER: Gold; US: Gold	Happy Nation/The Sign
1994	"Living in Danger"	28	103	19	7	—	—	23	26	18	20		Happy Nation/The Sign
1995	"Lucky Love"	1	30	14	6	2	1	13	19	20	30		The Bridge
1995	"Beautiful Life"	22	11	24	3	10	3	20	33	15	15	AUS: Gold	The Bridge
1996	"Never Gonna Say I'm Sorry"	24	79	38	70	—	17	44	—	—	—		The Bridge
1998	"Life Is a Flower"	5	—	15	—	3	3	20	18	5	—	SWE: Gold; UK: Silver	Flowers/Cruel Summer
1998	"Cruel Summer"	33	59	28	6	—	11	28	21	8	10	US: Gold	Flowers/Cruel Summer
1998	"Whenever You're Near Me"	—	—	—	51	—	—	—	—	—	76		Flowers/Cruel Summer
1998	"Travel to Romantis"	—	—	—	—	—	—	61	—	—	—		Flowers/Cruel Summer
1998	"Always Have, Always Will"	—	61	29	—	—	—	47	—	12	—		Flowers/Cruel Summer
1999	"Everytime It Rains"	—	—	—	—	—	—	—	—	22	—		Flowers/Cruel Summer
1999	"Cecilia"	—	—	—	—	—	—	—	—	—	—		Flowers/Cruel Summer
1999	"C'est la Vie (Always 21)"	38	—	—	—	—	11	64	100	—	—		Singles of the 90s
2000	"Hallo Hallo"	—	—	—	—	—	12	99	—	—	—		Singles of the 90s
2002	"Beautiful Morning"	14	—	47	—	18	20	38	32	—	—		Da Capo
2002	"Unspeakable"	45	—	—	—	—	14	97	—	—	—		Da Capo
2002	"The Juvenile"	—	—	—	—	—	—	78	—	—	—		Da Capo
2009	"Wheel of Fortune 2009"	—	—	—	—	—	—	—	—	—	—		Greatest Hits
2010	"All for You"	—	—	—	—	—	—	38	—	—	—		The Golden Ratio
2015	"Would You Believe"	—	—	—	—	—	—	—	—	—	—		Hidden Gems
"—" denotes items that did not chart or were not released in that territory.

== Home video ==
Title	Video/DVD details	Peak chart positions	Certifications
Title	Video/DVD details	US Video	Certifications
The Sign – The Home Video	Released: 24 May 1994; Label: Arista; Formats: VHS, LaserDisc	3	CAN: Gold; US: Gold
Happy Nation	Released: 20 October 1994; Label: Polydor; Formats: VHS	—	
Da Capo – The DVD	Released: 11 November 2002; Label: Polydor; Formats: DVD	—	
The Universal Masters DVD Collection: Classic Ace of Base	Released: 2 August 2005; Label: Polydor/Universal Music; Formats: DVD	—	
Greatest Hits	Released: 18 November 2008; Label: Polydor/Universal Music; Formats: DVD/CD	—	
"—" denotes items that did not chart or were not released in that territory.

== Music videos ==
This is a list of official music videos for Ace of Base singles and when they were released.

Year	Single	Director
1992	"Wheel of Fortune"	Viking Nielson
1992	"All That She Wants"	Matt Broadley
1992	"Happy Nation"	Matt Broadley
1993	"The Sign"	Mathias Julin
1993	"Don't Turn Around"	Matt Broadley
1994	"Living in Danger"	Matt Broadley
1995	"Lucky Love"	Matt Broadley
1995	"Beautiful Life" (Bubbles version)	Richard Heslop
1995	"Beautiful Life"	Richard Heslop
1995	"Never Gonna Say I'm Sorry" (Morph version)	Richard Heslop
1995	"Never Gonna Say I'm Sorry"	Richard Heslop
1996	"Lucky Love" (US version)	Rocky Schenk
1998	"Life Is a Flower"	Andy Neumann
1998	"Cruel Summer"	Nigel Dick
1998	"Cruel Summer" (US version)	Nigel Dick
1998	"Cruel Summer" (French version featuring Alliage)	Peder Pedersen
1998	"Always Have Always Will"	Ace of Base
1998	"Travel to Romantis"	Andy Neumann
1999	"C'est la Vie (Always 21)"	Patric Ullaeus
2002	"Beautiful Morning"	Daniel Borjesson
2003	"Unspeakable"	Daniel Borjesson
2008	"Wheel of Fortune 2009"	Ace of Base
2010	"All for You"	Patric Ullaeus
2015	"Would You Believe"	Tracee Adam
