= Greatest Hits (2008 Ace of Base album) =

2008 greatest hits album by Ace of Base

Box set by Ace of Base
- Released: 14 November 2008
- Recorded: 1991–2008
- Genre: Pop
- Length: 54:45
- Labels: Mega/Playground Music (original); Crimson Productions (Gold)

Ace of Base chronology
The Ultimate Collection (2005)	Greatest Hits (2008)	Platinum & Gold (2010)
Hidden Gems (2015)	Gold (2019)	All That She Wants: The Classic Collection (2020)

Gold cover
- Ace of Base – Gold (repackaged release)

Greatest Hits is a greatest hits album by Swedish group Ace of Base. It is their second compilation with this title, the first being Arista's 2000 US release Greatest Hits (2000). It was released by Mega Records and Playground Music on 14 November 2008. The compilation was released in multiple formats, including a single disc edition and a 2-CD+DVD compilation which includes 16 of their hits, 13 previously released remixes, and 17 music videos. The set also includes four newly recorded remakes of hit songs. Beside previously unreleased songs included on the 2015 compilation album Hidden Gems, this is the last Ace of Base album to date with new material to feature vocalist Jenny Berggren.

In 2019, the collection was repackaged with Hidden Gems instead of the DVD and released as Ace of Base – Gold in the United Kingdom. The re-release charted at number 59 for one week in the UK and thus was Ace of Base's return to the charts since their 2010 album The Golden Ratio worldwide and since the 1999 compilation Singles of the 90s in the UK.

== Background ==
The project was initially conceived as Ace of Base's fifth studio album, to consist of seven new songs and seven re-recordings of hit songs. The remakes were created to give the songs a more modern feel. According to Ulf Ekberg, the compilation was a contract obligation and halted plans for the band's then-upcoming album. Though Linn's image appears on the cover of the compilation, she is not featured on any of the new material.

The set includes re-recorded versions of the songs "Wheel of Fortune" and "Don't Turn Around", while the version released internationally on iTunes includes a remake of "Lucky Love", and the Japanese edition includes a new version of "The Sign". An expanded version of the remixes portion called "Classic Remixes Extended" was later released to iTunes, consisting of 44 previously released remixes.

== Track listings ==
Greatest Hits
No.	Title	Writer(s)	Producer(s)	Length
1.	"The Sign" (from Happy Nation/The Sign)	Jonas "Joker" Berggren	Denniz Pop; Joker; Douglas Carr	3:08
2.	"All That She Wants" (from Happy Nation/The Sign)	Joker; Ulf Ekberg	Pop; Joker; Ekberg	3:30
3.	"Wheel of Fortune" (from Happy Nation/The Sign)	Joker; Ekberg	Joker; Ekberg; TOEC	3:40
4.	"Lucky Love" (from The Bridge)	Joker; Billy Steinberg	Pop; Max Martin; Joker	2:52
5.	"Beautiful Life" (from The Bridge)	Joker; John Ballard	Pop; Martin; Joker	3:39
6.	"Happy Nation" (radio edit; from Happy Nation/The Sign)	Joker; Ekberg	Joker; Ekberg	3:32
7.	"Life Is a Flower" (from Flowers)	Joker	Joker; Per Adebratt; Tommy Ekman	3:47
8.	"Don't Turn Around" (from Happy Nation/The Sign)	Albert Hammond; Diane Warren	Per Adebratt; Tommy Ekman	3:51
9.	"Hallo Hallo" (from Singles of the 90s)	Joker	The Trinity Boys	2:51
10.	"Always Have, Always Will" (from Flowers/Cruel Summer)	Joker; Mike Chapman	Ole Evenrude	3:46
11.	"Cruel Summer" (Big Bonus Mix; from Flowers)	Sara Dallin; Siobhan Fahey; Keren Woodward; Anthony Swain; Steve Jolley	Stephen Hague; Joker; Ekberg; Johnny Jam & Delgado	4:07
12.	"Unspeakable" (from Da Capo)	Joker; Adam Anders; Nicklas von der Burg; Magnus Lindsten	von der Burg; Harry Sommerdahl; Joker	3:15
13.	"C'est la Vie (Always 21)" (from Singles of the 90s/Greatest Hits)	Joker	J. Ekgren; S. Pettersen; S. Rösnes	3:27
14.	"Living in Danger" (from Happy Nation/The Sign)	Joker; Ekberg	Adebratt; Ekman	3:10
15.	"Beautiful Morning" (from Da Capo)	Joker; Jenny Berggren; Linn Berggren	Pontus Söderqvist; Axel Breitung^{[a]}; Kay Nickold^{[b]}	3:00
16.	"Da Capo" (from Da Capo)	Joker	Thorsten Brötzmann; Jeo; von der Burg^{[c]}; Sommerdahl^{[c]}; Håkan Christoffersson^{[d]}; Joker^{[d]}	3:10
Total length:				54:45

Greatest Hits – iTunes edition
No.	Title	Writer(s)	Producer(s)	Length
1.	"Lucky Love 2009" (new recording)	Joker; Steinberg	Karl-Johan Råsmark	3:00
2.	"The Sign" (from Happy Nation/The Sign)	Joker	Pop; Joker; Carr	3:08
3.	"All That She Wants" (from Happy Nation/The Sign)	Joker; Ekberg	Pop; Joker; Ekberg	3:30
4.	"Wheel of Fortune" (from Happy Nation/The Sign)	Joker; Ekberg	Joker; Ekberg; TOEC	3:40
5.	"Lucky Love" (from The Bridge)	Joker; Steinberg	Pop; Martin; Joker	2:52
6.	"Beautiful Life" (from The Bridge)	Joker; Ballard	Pop; Martin; Joker	3:39
7.	"Happy Nation" (radio edit; from Happy Nation/The Sign)	Joker; Ekberg	Joker; Ekberg	3:32
8.	"Life Is a Flower" (from Flowers)	Joker	Joker; Per Adebratt; Tommy Ekman	3:47
9.	"Don't Turn Around" (from Happy Nation/The Sign)	Hammond; Warren	Adebratt; Ekman	3:51
10.	"Hallo Hallo" (from Singles of the 90s)	Joker	The Trinity Boys	2:51
11.	"Always Have, Always Will" (from Flowers/Cruel Summer)	Joker; Chapman	Ole Evenrude	3:46
12.	"Cruel Summer" (Big Bonus Mix; from Flowers)	Dallin; Fahey; Woodward; Swain; Jolley	Hague; Joker; Ekberg; Jam & Delgado	4:07
13.	"Unspeakable" (from Da Capo)	Joker; Anders; N. von der Burg; Lindsten	N. von der Burg; Sommerdahl; Joker	3:15
14.	"C'est la Vie (Always 21)" (from Singles of the 90s/Greatest Hits)	Joker	J. Ekgren; S. Pettersen; S. Rösnes	3:27
15.	"Living in Danger" (from Happy Nation/The Sign)	Joker; Ekberg	Adebratt; Ekman	3:10
16.	"Beautiful Morning" (from Da Capo)	Joker; Jenny Berggren; L. Berggren	Söderqvist; Breitung^{[a]}; Nickold^{[b]}	3:00
17.	"Da Capo" (from Da Capo)	Joker	Brötzmann; Jeo; N. von der Burg^{[c]}; Sommerdahl^{[c]}; Christoffersson^{[d]}; Joker^{[d]}	3:10
18.	"Whenever You're Near Me" (from Cruel Summer)	Chapman	Evenrude	3:32
19.	"Everytime It Rains" (from Cruel Summer)	Steinberg; Rick Nowels; Maria Vidal	Cutfather & Joe	3:55
20.	"Love in December" (from Singles of the 90s)	Joker; Ekberg; Jenny Berggren; L. Berggren	Soul Poets	4:00
Total length:				69:12

Greatest Hits – Japan edition
No.	Title	Writer(s)	Producer(s)	Length
1.	"The Sign" (from Happy Nation/The Sign)	Joker	Pop; Joker; Carr	3:09
2.	"All That She Wants" (from Happy Nation/The Sign)	Joker; Ekberg	Pop; Joker; Ekberg	3:30
3.	"Wheel of Fortune" (from Happy Nation/The Sign)	Joker; Ekberg	Joker; Ekberg; TOEC	3:40
4.	"Lucky Love" (from The Bridge)	Joker; Steinberg	Pop; Martin; Joker	2:52
5.	"Beautiful Life" (from The Bridge)	Joker; Ballard	Pop; Martin; Joker	3:39
6.	"Happy Nation" (radio edit; from Happy Nation/The Sign)	Joker; Ekberg	Joker; Ekberg	3:32
7.	"Life Is a Flower" (from Flowers)	Joker	Joker; Adebratt; Ekman	3:47
8.	"Don't Turn Around" (from Happy Nation/The Sign)	Hammond; Warren	Adebratt; Ekman	3:51
9.	"Hallo Hallo" (from Singles of the 90s)	Joker	The Trinity Boys	2:51
10.	"Always Have, Always Will" (from Flowers/Cruel Summer)	Joker; Chapman	Ole Evenrude	3:46
11.	"Cruel Summer" (from Flowers/Cruel Summer)	Dallin; Fahey; Woodward; Swain; Jolley	Cutfather & Joe	4:07
12.	"Unspeakable" (from Da Capo)	Joker; Anders; N. von der Burg; Lindsten	N. von der Burg; Sommerdahl; Joker	3:15
13.	"C'est la Vie (Always 21)" (from Singles of the 90s/Greatest Hits)	Joker	Ekgren; Pettersen; Rösnes	3:27
14.	"Living in Danger" (from Happy Nation/The Sign)	Joker; Ekberg	Adebratt; Ekman	3:10
15.	"Beautiful Morning" (from Da Capo)	Joker; Jenny Berggren; Linn Berggren	Pontus Söderqvist; Axel Breitung^{[a]}; Kay Nickold^{[b]}	3:00
16.	"Everytime It Rains" (from Cruel Summer)	Steinberg; Rick Nowels; Maria Vidal	Cutfather & Joe	3:55
17.	"The Sign" (Freedom Bunch Mix; new recording)	Joker	Freedom Bunch	3:19
Total length:				58:49

Classic Remixes
No.	Title	Writer(s)	Producer(s)	Length
1.	"Wheel of Fortune 2009" (new recording)	Joker; Ekberg	Karl-Johan Råsmark	3:46
2.	"Don't Turn Around 2009" (new recording)	Hammond; Warren	Råsmark	3:06
3.	"The Sign" (The Remix)	Joker	Joker; Ekberg; TOEC	5:42
4.	"Cruel Summer" (Soul Poets House Bust)	Dallin; Fahey; Woodward; Swain; Jolley	Cutfather & Joe; Soul Poets^{[a]}	3:46
5.	"Never Gonna Say I'm Sorry" (Sweetbox Funky Mix)	Joker	Pop; Martin; Joker; Sweetbox^{[a]}	6:47
6.	"Life Is a Flower" (Soul Poets Night Club Mix)	Joker	Joker; Adebratt; Ekman; Soul Poets^{[a]}	5:14
7.	"All That She Wants" (Madness Version)	Joker	Pop; Joker; Ekberg	3:30
8.	"Lucky Love" (Raggasol Version)	Joker; Steinberg	Pop; Martin; Joker	2:53
9.	"Travel to Romantis" (Love to Infinity Master Mix)	Joker	Joker; Jam & Delgado; Love to Infinity^{[a]}	7:22
10.	"C'est la Vie (Always 21)" (Remix)	Joker	J. Ekgren; S. Pettersen; S. Rösnes; Discomatic^{[a]}	3:58
11.	"Happy Nation" (Moody Gold Mix)	Joker; Ekberg	Joker; Ekberg	4:02
12.	"Hallo Hallo" (Dub)	Joker	Jonas von der Burg	6:04
13.	"Living in Danger" (D-House Mix - Short Version)	Joker	Adebratt; Ekman; David Morales^{[a]}	3:27
14.	"Beautiful LIfe" (Lenny B's House of Joy Club Mix)	Joker; Ballard	Pop; Martin; Joker; Lenny B^{[a]}	6:57
15.	"Megamix" (Long Version)		Glenn Olsson^{[a]}; Mathias Enberg^{[a]}	7:20
Total length:				73:54

Classic Remixes – Bonus track edition (iTunes)
No.	Title	Writer(s)	Producer(s)	Length
1.	"Wheel of Fortune 2009" (new recording)	Joker; Ekberg	Karl-Johan Råsmark	3:46
2.	"Don't Turn Around 2009" (new recording)	Hammond; Warren	Råsmark	3:06
3.	"The Sign" (The Remix)	Joker	Joker; Ekberg; TOEC	5:42
4.	"Cruel Summer" (Soul Poets House Bust)	Dallin; Fahey; Woodward; Swain; Jolley	Cutfather & Joe; Soul Poets^{[a]}	3:46
5.	"Never Gonna Say I'm Sorry" (Sweetbox Funky Mix)	Joker	Pop; Martin; Joker; Sweetbox^{[a]}	6:47
6.	"Life Is a Flower" (Soul Poets Night Club Mix)	Joker	Joker; Adebratt; Ekman; Soul Poets^{[a]}	5:14
7.	"All That She Wants" (Madness Version)	Joker	Pop; Joker; Ekberg	3:30
8.	"Lucky Love" (Raggasol Version)	Joker; Steinberg	Pop; Martin; Joker	2:53
9.	"Travel to Romantis" (Love to Infinity Master Mix)	Joker	Joker; Jam & Delgado; Love to Infinity^{[a]}	7:22
10.	"C'est la Vie (Always 21)" (Remix)	Joker	J. Ekgren; S. Pettersen; S. Rösnes; Discomatic^{[a]}	3:58
11.	"Happy Nation" (Moody Gold Mix)	Joker; Ekberg	Joker; Ekberg	4:02
12.	"Hallo Hallo" (Dub)	Joker	Jonas von der Burg	6:04
13.	"Living in Danger" (D-House Mix - Short Version)	Joker	Adebratt; Ekman; David Morales^{[a]}	3:27
14.	"Beautiful LIfe" (Lenny B's House of Joy Club Mix)	Joker; Ballard	Pop; Martin; Joker; Lenny B^{[a]}	6:57
15.	"Megamix" (Long Version)		Glenn Olsson^{[a]}; Mathias Enberg^{[a]}	7:20
16.	"Don't Turn Around" (7" Aswad Mix)	Hammond; Warren	Adebratt; Ekman; Aswad^{[a]}	4:23
17.	"Wheel of Fortune" (Clubmix)	Joker; Ekberg	Joker; Ekberg; TOEC	4:39
Total length:				82:56

Notes

- ^{^[a]} signifies a remixer
- ^{^[b]} signifies an assistant producer
- ^{^[c]} signifies a vocal producer
- ^{^[d]} signifies a co-producer

Classic Remixes Extended (iTunes)

1. "The Sign" (Ultimix) – 6:48
2. "The Sign" (Dub Version) – 5:08
3. "All That She Wants" (12" Version) – 6:46
4. "Lucky Love" (Frankie Knuckles Classic Club Mix) – 7:23
5. "Lucky Love" (Amadin Remix) – 5:43
6. "Lucky Love" (Armand's British Nites Remix) – 11:22
7. "Lucky Love" (Vission Lorimer Funkdified Mix) – 6:04
8. "Lucky Love" (Lenny B's Club Mix) – 7:09
9. "Happy Nation" (Gold Zone Club Mix) – 5:41
10. "Everytime It Rains" (Soul Poets Club Mix) – 4:22
11. "Life Is a Flower" (Absolom Short Edit) – 5:19
12. "Life Is a Flower" (Milk Long Edit) – 5:14
13. "Life Is a Flower" (Sweetbox Mix 1) – 6:16
14. "Wheel of Fortune" (12" Mix) – 5:27
15. "Hallo Hallo" (Hitvision Radio Edit) – 3:06
16. "Hallo Hallo" (Dub) – 4:46
17. "Beautiful Life" (Junior's Circuit Bump Mix) – 8:20
18. "Beautiful Life" (Vission Lorimer Club Mix) – 7:01
19. "Beautiful Life" (Uno Clio Mix) – 8:23
20. "Never Gonna Say I'm Sorry" (Lenny B's Club Mix) – 8:25
21. "Never Gonna Say I'm Sorry" (Lenny B's Organ-ic House Mix) – 7:15
22. "Don't Turn Around" (Turned Out Eurodub) – 7:26
23. "Don't Turn Around" (Groove Mix Extended) – 5:19
24. "Cruel Summer" (Cutfather & Joe Mix) – 3:34^{1}
25. "Cruel Summer" (Hartmann & Langhoff Short Mix) – 3:21
26. "Cruel Summer" (KLM Club Mix) – 10:29
27. "Cruel Summer" (Hani Num Club Mix) – 8:13
28. "Cruel Summer" (Blazin' Rhythm Remix) – 3:21
29. "Whenever You're Near Me" (Strobe's Radio Remix) – 3:23
30. "Whenever You're Near Me" (Lollipop Mix) – 3:27
31. "Whenever You're Near Me" (Nikolas & Sibley Dance Mix) – 8:55
32. "Living in Danger" (Old School Mix) – 4:49
33. "Living in Danger" (Principle Mix) – 8:53
34. "Living in Danger" (Buddha Mix) – 3:38
35. "Beautiful Morning" (Spanish Fly Radio Edit) – 2:57
36. "Beautiful Morning" (Groove Radio Edit) – 2:47
37. "Unspeakable" (Junk&Function/M12 Club Mix) – 3:05
38. "Unspeakable" (Fairlite Radio Mix) – 3:18
39. "Unspeakable" (Filur Radio Mix) – 3:28
40. "Travel to Romantis" (Josef Larossi Mix) – 5:35
41. "Travel to Romantis" (Love to Infinity Mix) – 7:22
42. "Travel to Romantis" (Wolf Mix) – 4:03
43. "Never Gonna Say I'm Sorry" (Long Version) – 6:34
44. "Never Gonna Say I'm Sorry" (Rock Version) – 4:02

^{1}"Cruel Summer" (Cutfather & Joe Mix) is the album version of the song.

Hidden Gems – Gold
No.	Title	Writer(s)	Producer(s)	Length
1.	"Would You Believe" (previously unreleased; era: Da Capo)	Joker	Ekman; Joker	2:50
2.	"Go Go Go" (previously unreleased; era: Da Capo)	Joker	Söderqvist; Joker	3:29
3.	"Into the Night of Blue" (B-side from the single "Cruel Summer")	Joker; Carr; Warren	Joker; Hague	4:13
4.	"Don’t Stop" (B-side from the single "The Juvenile")	Joker; Arild Haugland; Birthe Berggren	Sommerdahl; Joker; Jonas von der Burg	2:49
5.	"Make My Day" (previously unreleased; era: Da Capo)	Joker	Ekman; Joker	2:55
6.	"Mercy Mercy" (B-side from the single "Always Have, Always Will")	Ekberg; Ballard	Charles Fisher; Ekberg	3:37
7.	"No Good Lover" (B-side from the single "Life Is a Flower")	Joker	John Amatiello; Joker	3:35
8.	"Summer Days" (from the Japanese Da Capo release)	Joker	Jonas von der Burg; Joker	3:46
9.	"Giving It Up" (2014 remake; previously unreleased; era: The Sign/Happy Nation)	Joker; Ekberg	Joker; Ekberg	2:46
10.	"Come to Me" (previously unreleased; era: Da Capo)	Joker; Haugland; Birthe Berggren	Håkan Kristoffersson; Joker	3:54
11.	"Prime Time" (previously unreleased; era: Da Capo)	Joker	Ekman; Joker	3:14
12.	"Look Around Me" (previously unreleased; era: The Bridge)	Ekberg; Ballard	Ballard; Ekberg; Björn Stenström	3:16
13.	"Pole Position" (previously unreleased; era: The Sign/Happy Nation)	Joker; Ekberg; Linn Berggren; Jenny Berggren	Joker; Ekberg	3:23
14.	"Sunset in Southern California" (remade as "Southern California" on The Golden Ratio; era: Da Capo)	Joker	Ekman; Joker	3:12
15.	"Moment of Magic" (previously unreleased; era: Da Capo)	Joker; Ekberg; Linn Berggren; Jenny Berggren	Joker; Ekberg	2:29
Total length:				49:28

== DVD ==
1. "All That She Wants"
2. "Wheel of Fortune"
3. "Happy Nation"
4. "The Sign"
5. "Don't Turn Around"
6. "Living in Danger"
7. "Lucky Love"
8. "Beautiful Life"
9. "Never Gonna Say I'm Sorry"
10. "Life Is a Flower"
11. "Cruel Summer" (Big Bonus Mix)
12. "Travel to Romantis"
13. "Always Have, Always Will"
14. "C'est la Vie (Always 21)"
15. "Beautiful Morning"
16. "Lucky Love" (acoustic)^{1}
17. "Unspeakable"

Notes

- DVD is in NTSC format only.

^{1}This is not the US version of the video. Instead, it is an alternate edit of the original European video featuring the acoustic version of the song.

== Charts ==
Chart (2019)	Peak position
UK Albums (Official Charts)	59
