= The Ultimate Collection (Ace of Base album) =

Box set by Ace of Base
- Released: 19 July 2005
- Recorded: 1992–2002
- Genre: Pop
- Label: Universal
- Producer: Various

Ace of Base chronology
Platinum & Gold Collection (2003)	The Ultimate Collection (2005)	Greatest Hits (2008)

Professional ratings
Review scores
Source	Rating
Allmusic	3.5/5 stars

The Ultimate Collection is an Ace of Base compilation album released by Universal Music Netherlands in May 2005. Each CD includes some of their biggest hits, plus a third bonus CD with only remixes, mostly of songs from their debut album.

== Track listing ==
Disc: 1

1. All That She Wants
2. Wheel of Fortune
3. Happy Nation
4. The Sign
5. Waiting for Magic
6. Don't Turn Around
7. Living in Danger
8. Lucky Love
9. Beautiful Life
10. Never Gonna Say I'm Sorry
11. My Déjà Vu
12. Perfect World
13. Life Is a Flower
14. Cruel Summer

Disc: 2

1. Donnie
2. Travel to Romantis
3. Always Have, Always Will
4. Everytime It Rains
5. Cecilia
6. Tokyo Girl
7. C'est la Vie
8. Hallo Hallo
9. Love in December
10. Beautiful Morning
11. Unspeakable
12. The Juvenile
13. Da Capo
14. What's the Name of the Game

Disc: 3

1. Wheel of Fortune (Original Club Mix)
2. My Mind (Mindless Mix)
3. All That She Wants (Banghra Version)
4. Happy Nation (Remix)
5. The Sign (Dub Version)
6. Don't Turn Around (Stretch Version)
7. Lucky Love (Armand's 'British Nites' Remix)
8. Cruel Summer (Big Bonus Mix)
9. Megamix: Wheel of Fortune/All That She Wants/Don't Turn Around/The Sign
