= Platinum & Gold =

Greatest hits album by Ace of Base
- Released: 10 March 2010
- Recorded: 1992–2008
- Genre: Pop
- Label: Warner Music Sweden

Ace of Base chronology
Greatest Hits (2008)	Platinum & Gold (2010)	The Golden Ratio (2010)

Platinum & Gold is a 2010 compilation album by the Swedish group Ace of Base, released in Sweden, Denmark, and Norway.

== Track listing ==
Disc 1:

1. All That She Wants
2. The Sign
3. Beautiful Life
4. Life Is a Flower
5. Lucky Love
6. Always Have, Always Will
7. Wheel of Fortune
8. Don't Turn Around
9. C'est la Vie (Always 21)
10. Beautiful Morning
11. Happy Nation
12. Ordinary Day
13. Living in Danger
14. Cruel Summer
15. Unspeakable
16. Hallo Hallo

Disc 2:

1. Wheel of Fortune (2009 New Version)
2. The Sign (Remix)
3. Never Gonna Say I'm Sorry (Sweetbox Funky Mix)
4. Cruel Summer (Soul Poets house Bust)
5. Life Is a Flower (Soul Poets Night Club Mix)
6. All That She Wants (Madness Version)
7. Lucky Love (Raggasol Version)
8. Beautiful Life (Lenny B's house of Joy Club Mix)
9. Happy Nation (Moody Gold Mix)
10. C'est la Vie (Always 21) (Remix)
11. Living in Danger (D-house Mix)
12. Travel to Romantis (Love to Infinity Master Mix)
13. Hallo Hallo (Dub)
14. Megamix (Long Version)

== Charts ==
Chart	Peak position
Danish Albums Chart	26
Norwegian Albums Chart	6
