= All That She Wants (TV series) =

- Promotional poster
- Genre: Documentary
- Directed by: Jens von Reis
- Starring: Ulf Ekberg; Jenny Berggren; Malin Berggren; Jonas Berggren
- Music by: Erik Althoff; Isak Söderberg
- Opening theme: "Beautiful Life"
- Ending theme: "All That She Wants (Bali Bandits Remix)"
- Country of origin: Sweden
- Original languages: English; Swedish
- No. of seasons: 1
- No. of episodes: 3

Production
- Executive producers: Martin Akander; Johan Wennberg
- Running time: 42 minutes
- Production company: Nexiko

Original release
- Network: SBS On Demand
- Release: 3 April 2024
- Network: Viaplay
- Release: 1 May 2024

All That She Wants (aka All That She Wants: The Unbelievable Story of Ace of Base) is a limited-run documentary television series produced by Viaplay, directed by Jens von Reis. The series explores the meteoritic rise of Swedish pop group Ace of Base; the highs and the lows, and where they are today. Former lead singer, Linn Berggren, breaks her silence in the form of a letter after over two decades in seclusion away from the public eye. Interviewees include American record producer Clive Davis and Haitian rapper and musician Wyclef Jean. The series premiered in Australia on SBS On Demand 3 April 2024. It became available on 1 May 2024 through other broadcasters in other territories and on Viaplay.

== Background and development ==
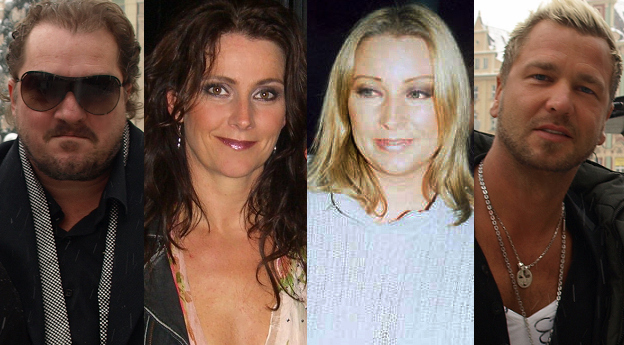
The founding members of Ace of Base: (from left to right) Jonas "Joker" Berggren, Jenny Berggren, Malin "Linn" Berggren, and Ulf "Buddha" Ekberg

The Swedish quartet, Ace of Base, made up of siblings Jonas, Jenny, and Linn Berggren, along with their friend Ulf Ekberg, took the world by storm in late 1992 with their record-breaking debut album Happy Nation. With success came immense pressure to continue delivering hits and sales similar to that of their groundbreaking debut. By 1996, the stress brought the Gothenburg natives close to the breaking point. They would release three follow-up albums before taking a long hiatus in the early 2000s. The stress would eventually became too much for bandmember Linn Berggren to handle. She officially left the band in 2005, but not before taking a backseat as lead singer starting with the group's third album Flowers (1998) leading to much speculation about the star's personal life. In 2007, Ace of Base reunited as a trio to perform their first full-length concert since 1996 in Yekaterinburg, Russia. They embarked on a world tour entitled Ace of Base - Redefined!, which continued throughout 2008 and 2009. The set list included several new versions of their greatest hits. By 2010, Jenny Berggren set her sights on a solo career with Jonas and Ulf deciding to recruit two new female vocalists and continue as Ace of Base. This led to a rift between Jenny and her former bandmates. Beginning in 2011, Jonas Berggren, through the group's official Facebook account, and the website ReverbNation, began releasing previously unreleased material on a semi-regular basis; this was referred to as "Ace Thursdays". This would inspire an album made up of remastered unreleased material and b-sides, Hidden Gems (2015). In 2020, the band began to celebrate the band's 30th anniversary with a series of anniversary releases. A documentary went into production in 2022. Jenny Berggren continues to perform as Jenny of Ace of Base around the world performing the group's greatest hits. She released her memoir, Vinna hela Världen in 2009. Jonas Berggren continues to write music, while Ulf Ekberg has moved into the world of technology. Much of the never-before-seen footage featured in the documentary comes from the Ekberg's personal archives.

Linn Berggren's letter

For my sister to read. To Ulf: You wanted light. God bless you. Jenny, my co-pilot and master of struggling, has got the best voice ever. Listen to her chorus in "Memories Forever". It is so wonderful. And to my hardworking brother Jonas: he also has the best voice ever. Listen to the beginning of "Happy Nation". He has always been the sweetest, most protecting and caring big brother me and Jenny could have had. He has always struggled and fought for our sake from the very beginning. He has worked in the best interest of everyone involved in Ace of Base. They both make me so proud. To my beautiful, kind family of singing philosophers: keep singing, life goes on. Jonas, keep making melodies that change our hurting world into a better place. We were all our joy. Nobody in Ace of Base have forced me to sing. To all of you out there who have loved the music: thank you. Joy and strength. Linn.

— Linn Berggren's letter read by her sister Jenny in the documentary

== Episodes ==
No.	Title	Original release date
1	"Episode 1"	3 April 2024
The band's humble origins and early days are detailed. A revelation about Ulf's past threatens to destroy the band.
2	"Episode 2"	3 April 2024
The pressures of fame begin to take a toll on the group.
3	"Episode 3"	3 April 2024
The band's world is turned upside down after a crazed knife-wielding fan breaks into the Berggren family's home and threatens Jenny and her parents' lives. Linn Berggren breaks her silence.

== International broadcast ==
The series premiered in Australia on SBS On Demand 3 April 2024. In Greece it premiered on Vodafone Greece 30 April 2024. In Sweden, the series began airing on TV3 on 1 May 2024, as well as on Viaplay the same day. The documentary premiered in Poland on Canal+ Premium. The series became available in the United States on Viaplay, 5 December 2024.

Country	Broadcasters
Australia	SBS On Demand
Denmark	Viaplay & DR TV
Finland	Viaplay
Germany	Viaplay
Greece	Vodafone Greece
Iceland	Viaplay
Indonesia	Mola
Israel	Hot
Lithuania	LRT TV
Netherlands	Viaplay
Norway	Viaplay
Poland	Canal+ Premium
Portugal	TVCine
Sweden	TV3 & Viaplay
United Kingdom	Amazon Prime Video
United States	Amazon Prime Video & Viaplay
