= Come (Jenny Berggren song) =

Single by Jenny Berggren

from the album Så Mycket Bättre (Säsong 6)
- Released: 18 October 2015
- Length: 3:39
- Label: Ipono/Universal Sweden
- Songwriter(s): Jenny Berggren * Niklas Strömstedt

Jenny Berggren singles chronology
"Let Your Heart Be Mine" (2011)	"Come" (2015)	"Push Play" (2015)

"Come" is a single by Swedish singer-songwriter and former lead singer of the group Ace of Base, Jenny Berggren. It is an English cover of the Swedish song "Om" by Niklas Strömstedt and was performed for the first time at the sixth season of the Swedish TV show Så mycket bättre and later released on the compilation album Så Mycket Bättre (Säsong 6).

== Charts ==
Chart (2015)	Peak position
Sweden (Sverigetopplistan)	47
