= Would You Believe (song) =

Single by Ace of Base

from the album Hidden Gems
- Released: 27 February 2015
- Recorded: 2005
- Genre: Pop
- Length: 2:50
- Label: Playground Music
- Songwriter(s): Jonas Berggren
- Producer(s): Jonas Berggren, Tommy Ekman

Ace of Base singles chronology
"All for You" (2010)	"Would You Believe" (2015)

Music video
- "Would You Believe" on YouTube

"Would You Believe" is the first single taken from Swedish pop group Ace of Base's compilation album Hidden Gems.

== Background and release ==
The song was initially recorded for inclusion on the band's fourth studio album Da Capo, with Jenny singing the choruses and Linn and Jenny sharing leads on verses. In 2005, a second version, dubbed the "summer version", was re-recorded in Stockholm and reproduced with new co-production by Tommy Ekman. The track was supposed to be a "restart for making a new album," according to Jonas, but this never came to fruition. This version features Linn on choruses and Jenny on verses, and is one of the final songs recorded by Linn during her tenure with Ace of Base. Both versions were shared on Facebook on 24 March 2011. An additional third version with vocals provided by Jonas's d'Cats project was shared on Facebook on 3 March 2011.

The version featured on Hidden Gems is a slightly remixed form of the summer version, with subtle differences in production and structure. This version of "Would You Believe" was first available worldwide as a digital preorder bonus to Hidden Gems alongside the previously released 1998 b-side "Into The Night of Blue". "Would You Believe" was officially released as a single in Germany on 27 February 2015.

== Music video ==
A lyric video for the song was released on 13 February 2015. The music video for the song was released on Ace of Base's official YouTube channel on 12 January 2016. The video was edited by Trace Adam and appeared online nearly a year prior to its official release in a slightly different form. The music video features segments from the 1995 and 1996 videos of "Lucky Love" strategically edited to make it appear as if the band members were singing to "Would You Believe." The version of the song that appears in the video is a slightly edited, shorter version that was not made commercially available.

== Artwork ==
The cover art for the digital German single features a photo taken at a photoshoot during the filming for the "C'est la Vie (Always 21)" video. The photo is similar in composition to the one used on the cover of the 2000 Greatest Hits release and the single artwork for "Hallo Hallo."

== Track listing ==
Digital download

1. "Would You Believe" – 2:50

== Credits and personnel ==
Credits for "Would You Believe" are taken from the liner notes of Hidden Gems.

- Tommy Ekman – production
- Jonas Berggren – songwriting, co-production
- Björn Engelmann – re-mastering

== Release history ==
Country	Date	Format	Label
Germany	27 February 2015	Digital download	Playground Music
