= Here I Am (Jenny Berggren song) =

Single by Jenny Berggren

from the album My Story
- Released: 12 May 2010
- Genre: Pop
- Length: 3:14
- Label: Ipono/Universal Sweden
- Songwriter(s): Jenny Berggren, Simon Petrén, Jenny Jaurén, Staffan Birgersson, Terese Fredenwall

Jenny Berggren singles chronology
"Here I Am" (2010)	"Gotta Go" (2010)

Music video
- "Here I Am" on YouTube

"Here I Am" is the first single by Swedish singer-songwriter and former lead singer of the group Ace of Base, Jenny Berggren. It was released as the first official single from her first solo album, My Story, in May 2010. Beside the main version of the song, there are also two remixes by Stockholm Sound. The "Sthlm Sound Facility Remix" was featured as a second track on the single CD and the "Sthlm Sound Radio Remix" was featured on My Story.

== Music video ==
The music video for the song is a simplistic video of Jenny in different outfits over white and black backgrounds.

== Track listings ==
=== Original release ===
CD single

1. "Here I Am (Main Version)"
2. "Here I Am (Sthlm Sound Facility Remix)"

== Charts ==
Chart	Peak position
Sweden (Sverigetopplistan)	14
