= All for You (Ace of Base song) =

Single by Ace of Base

from the album The Golden Ratio
- Released: 10 September 2010
- Recorded: 2010
- Genre: Pop
- Length: 3:36
- Label: Universal
- Songwriter(s): Jonas "Joker" Berggren, Jonas Saeed, Ulf "Buddha" Ekberg
- Producer(s): The Sign, Jonas Saeed

Ace of Base singles chronology
"Wheel of Fortune 2009" (2008)	"All for You" (2010)	"Would You Believe" (2015)

Music video
- "All for You" on YouTube

"All for You" is the sole single from the Ace of Base album The Golden Ratio. The single was serviced to radio stations in Germany in mid-August 2010 and was released as a physical single on 10 September 2010.

"All for You" entered and peaked the German charts at number 38.

== Music video ==
The music video was directed by Patric Ullaeus, who had previously directed the music video for the band's 1999 single, "C'est la Vie (Always 21)". Featuring a simplistic black-and-white concept, the video shows the members getting ready for a concert and participating in a photoshoot. The video was released on 27 August 2010.

== Track listing ==
CD single

1. "All for You" (Radio Version) – 3:36
2. "All for You" (Club Version) – 4:03

Digital download

1. "All for You" (Radio Version) – 3:36
2. "All for You" (Club Version) – 4:03
3. "All for You" (The Sign Dub Remix) – 4:41
4. "All for You" (Madhouse Monkeys Remix) – 5:56
5. "All for You" (Dance Extended Version) – 4:46
6. "All for You" (Michael Mind Project Remix) – 5:34

== Charts ==
Chart	Peak position
Germany (GfK)	38
Slovakia (Rádio Top 100)	45
Russia Airplay (Tophit)	122
