= My Story (Jenny Berggren album) =

Studio album by Jenny Berggren
- Released: 13 October 2010
- Recorded: 2009–2010
- Genre: Pop
- Length: 48:14
- Label: Universal

Singles from My Story
- 1. "Here I Am" Released: 12 May 2010; 2. "Gotta Go" Released: 15 September 2010

My Story is the debut solo studio album by Swedish singer-songwriter Jenny Berggren. It was released on 13 October 2010 through Universal Music Group.

== Background ==
Berggren, known for her work with the pop music group Ace of Base, released what later proved to be a demo version of "Free Me" for download on her official website on New Year's Day 2010, as a teaser for upcoming solo material. She revealed the track listing for her solo album on her website on 30 September 2010.

In May 2010, the first official single, "Here I Am", was released throughout Europe. "Here I Am" entered and peaked at number 14 on the Swedish charts. "Gotta Go" was released as the album's second single in September 2010, preceding the album's release in October 2010. The album was released worldwide through various music outlets, including iTunes. The album includes a new, remixed version of "Free Me", as well as a studio version of "Give Me the Faith", a song Berggren had begun singing at live appearances a decade earlier.

== Track listing ==
No.	Title	Writer(s)	Producer(s)	Length
1.	"Intro"	King David, Simon Petrén, Jonah Nilsson	Petrén, Nilsson	1:13
2.	"Free Me"	Jenny Berggren, Petrén, Terese Fredenwall	Petrén, Nilsson	2:32
3.	"Living in a Circus"	Petrén, Fredenwall, David Råsmark	Petrén, Fredenwall, Råsmark	2:59
4.	"Spend This Night"	Petrén, Berggren, Fredenwall	Petrén, Nilsson	2:35
5.	"Dying to Stay Alive"	Berggren, Petrén, Nilsson, Staffan Birgersson, Fredenwall	Petrén, Nilsson, Frendenwall	3:36
6.	"Numb"	Berggren	Petrén, Nilsson	4:14
7.	"Gotta Go"	Berggren, Petrén, Nilsson, Birgersson, Fredenwall, Jaurén	Petrén, Birgersson	4:03
8.	"Here I Am" (Main Version)	Berggren, Petrén, Birgersson, Fredenwall, Jenny Jaurén	Petrén, Birgersson, Nilsson, Fredenwall	3:13
9.	"Give Me the Faith"	Petrén, Berggren	Petrén, Jakob Petrén, Nilsson	4:55
10.	"Beat of My Heart"	Berggren, Martin Hedström, Petrén	Petrén, Nilsson	3:25
11.	"Air of Love"	Jakob Petrén, Berggren, Fredenwall	Petrén, Jakob Petrén	3:22
12.	"Natural Superstar"	Berggren, Petrén, Fredenwall	Petrén, Nilsson, Fredenwall	4:05
13.	"Here I Am" (Sthlm Sound Facility Radio Remix)	Berggren, Petrén, Birgersson, Fredenwall, Jaurén		4:07
14.	"Going Home"	Berggren, Jakob Petrén, Sam Mizell	Petrén, Birgersson	3:55

== Charts ==
Chart (2010)	Peak position
Swedish Albums (Sverigetopplistan)	48

== Release history ==
Region	Date3 2019	Format
Sweden	13 October 2010	Standard edition
