= Hidden Gems (Ace of Base album) =

Compilation album by Ace of Base
- Released: 6 March 2015
- Recorded: 1991–2006
- Genre: Pop
- Length: 49:28
- Label: Playground
- Producers: John Amatiello; John Ballard; Jonas Berggren; Ulf Ekberg; Charles Fisher; Stephen Hague; Håkan Kristoffersson; Pontus Söderqvist; Harry Sommerdahl; Jonas von der Burg

Ace of Base chronology
The Golden Ratio (2010)	Hidden Gems (2015)	Gold (2019)

Singles from Hidden Gems
- 1. "Would You Believe" Released: 27 February 2015

Hidden Gems is a 2015 compilation album by Swedish pop group Ace of Base. It was released worldwide by Playground Music on 6 March 2015.

== Background ==
The album consists of previously unreleased material and b-sides recorded by the original lineup between 1991 through 2006. The majority of the songs were previously released through the band's Facebook page during Ace Thursdays, though some of the tracks on the compilation feature updated production. Five of the included songs were previously released years prior as b-sides and bonus tracks.

"No Good Lover," included on this compilation, was originally meant to be a single from Flowers, but later did not make the cut for the album. A previously unreleased version of "Hey Darling," a track which first appeared on Da Capo, is included on Hidden Gems as an iTunes bonus track. "Sunset in Southern California" was re-worked and later released on The Golden Ratio in 2010 as "Southern California." A demo version of "Giving It Up" is featured as a bonus track on the 2015 remastered release of Happy Nation U.S. Version.

== Release ==
The album was released on CD and vinyl worldwide through the band's official website and through digital retailers on 6 March 2015. Two songs from the album, "Would You Believe" and "Into the Night of Blue," were made available through digital retailers prior to the album's release. The iTunes edition contains two additional songs as bonus tracks. Jonas Berggren stated on the band's official Facebook page that a second edition with different songs has been considered.

In 2019, the collection Greatest Hits from 2008 was repackaged with Hidden Gems instead of the music video DVD and was released as Ace Of Base – Gold.

== Hidden Gems, Vol. 2 ==
A follow-up to Hidden Gems, Hidden Gems, Vol. 2 was released as part of the All That She Wants: The Classic Collection (2020) box set. It was later released to digital platforms on 28 August 2020.

== Track listing ==
=== Hidden Gems, Vol. 1 ===
All songs were previously unreleased, unless otherwise specified.

No.	Title	Writer(s)	Producer(s)	Length
1.	"Would You Believe" (era: Da Capo)	Jonas Berggren	Tommy Ekman; Jonas Berggren	2:50
2.	"Go Go Go" (era: Da Capo)	Jonas Berggren	Pontus Söderqvist; Jonas Berggren	3:29
3.	"Into the Night of Blue" (B-side of "Cruel Summer")	Jonas Berggren; Douglas Carr; Diane Warren	Jonas Berggren; Stephen Hague	4:13
4.	"Don’t Stop" (B-side of "The Juvenile")	Jonas Berggren; Arild Haugland; Birthe Berggren	Harry Sommerdahl; Jonas Berggren; Jonas von der Burg	2:49
5.	"Make My Day" (era: Da Capo)	Jonas Berggren	Ekman; Jonas Berggren	2:55
6.	"Mercy Mercy" (B-side of "Always Have, Always Will")	Ulf Ekberg; John Ballard	Charles Fisher; Ekberg	3:37
7.	"No Good Lover" (B-side of "Life Is a Flower")	Jonas Berggren	John Amatiello; Jonas Berggren	3:35
8.	"Summer Days" (Da Capo Japanese bonus track)	Jonas Berggren	von der Burg; Jonas Berggren	3:46
9.	"Giving It Up" (2014 remake) (era: Happy Nation)	Jonas Berggren; Ekberg	Jonas Berggren; Ekberg	2:46
10.	"Come to Me" (Ace version (era: Da Capo)	Jonas Berggren; Haugland; B. Berggren	Håkan Kristoffersson; Jonas Berggren	3:54
11.	"Prime Time" (era: Da Capo)	Jonas Berggren	Ekman; Jonas Berggren	3:14
12.	"Look Around Me" (era: The Bridge)	Ekberg; Ballard	Ballard; Ekberg; Björn Stenström	3:16
13.	"Pole Position" (era: Happy Nation)	Jonas Berggren; Ekberg; Malin Berggren; Jenny Berggren	Jonas Berggren; Ekberg	3:23
14.	"Sunset in Southern California" (era: Da Capo; remade as "Southern California" on The Golden Ratio)	Jonas Berggren	Ekman; Jonas Berggren	3:12
15.	"Moment of Magic" (era: Da Capo)	Jonas Berggren; Ekberg; M. Berggren; Jenny Berggren	Jonas Berggren; Ekberg	2:29
Total length:				49:28

iTunes bonus tracks
No.	Title	Writer(s)	Producer(s)	Length
16.	"Hey Darling" (bells version) (previously unreleased; original version from Da Capo)	Jonas Berggren	Ole Evenrud	3:06
17.	"Cuba, Cuba Libre" (era: Da Capo)	Jonas Berggren	Evenrud	3:36
Total length:				56:10

All That She Wants: The Classic Collection CD bonus tracks
No.	Title	Writer(s)	Producer(s)	Length
16.	"Mr. Ace" (era: Happy Nation)	Jonas Berggren; Ekberg; M. Berggren; Jenny Berggren	Jonas Berggren; Ekberg	3:21
17.	"Moogoperator" (era: Happy Nation)	Jonas Berggren; Ekberg	Jonas Berggren; Ekberg	3:32
18.	"Kings and Queens" (Cruel Summer 2015 bonus track)	Ekberg; Ballard	Ballard; Ekberg; Stenström	3:23
19.	"Love for Sale" (B-side of "Always Have, Always Will")	Jonas Berggren	Jonas Berggren	3:35
20.	"L'amour" (from the compilation Let Love Be Love: X-mas 1998; era: Flowers)	Jonas Berggren; Steinberg	Jonas Berggren; Candy Hill	4:01
21.	"Would You Believe" (Alternative Version)	Jonas Berggren		3:05
22.	"Cuba Cuba Libre"	Jonas Berggren	Evenrud	3:36
23.	"Giving It Up" (Ace version)	Jonas Berggren; Ekberg		3:27

=== Hidden Gems, Vol. 2 ===
All songs were previously unreleased.

No.	Title	Writer(s)	Producer(s)	Length
1.	"Girl in the Line" (era: Da Capo)	Jonas Berggren	Jonas Berggren; Pontus Söderqvist	3:16
2.	"Love in the Ghetto" (era: Da Capo)	Jonas Berggren	Tommy Ekman; Jonas Berggren	2:53
3.	"Stranger to Love" (era: The Bridge/Flowers)	Ulf Ekberg; John Ballard	Ballard; Ekberg; Stenström	3:12
4.	"Memories Forever" (era: Flowers)	Jonas Berggren; Ekberg; Jenny Berggren; Malin Berggren	Jonas Berggren; Ekberg	3:46
5.	"At the Borderline (Moogoperator 2)" (era: Da Capo)	Jonas Berggren; Ekberg	Jonas Berggren; Ekberg	3:50
6.	"Kyrie Eleison" (era: Flowers)	Jonas Berggren	Jonas Berggren; Ekberg	2:13
7.	"Immanuel" (era: Flowers)	Jenny Berggren	Martin Hedström	2:47
8.	"Angel of Love" (era: The Bridge)	Ekberg; Ballard; Stenström	Ballard; Ekberg; Stenström	3:12
9.	"Stay with Me" (era: Flowers)	Jenny Berggren	Denniz Pop; Max Martin	3:23
10.	"For a Thousand Days" (era: The Bridge)	Jonas Berggren; Ekberg	Jonas Berggren; Ekberg	3:34
11.	"All Temptations" (era: Da Capo)	Jonas Berggren	Jonas Berggren; Håkan Kristoffersson	3:30
12.	"She Was Thinking of You" (era: Flowers)	Billy Steinberg; Rick Nowels; China Forbes	Jonas Berggren; Kristoffersson	3:16
13.	"The Challenge" (era: Flowers)	Jonas Berggren	Jonas Berggren; Douglas Carr; John Amatiello	2:48
14.	"Bad Dad" (era: Happy Nation)	Jonas Berggren; Ekberg	Jonas Berggren; Ekberg	3:57
15.	"The Wizard" (era: Happy Nation)	Jonas Berggren	Jonas Berggren; Tech Noir	3:13
16.	"Close to You" (era: Happy Nation)	Jonas Berggren; Ekberg	Jonas Berggren; Ekberg	3:54
17.	"Funk Funk" (era: Happy Nation)	Jonas Berggren; Ekberg	Jonas Berggren; Ekberg	3:32
18.	"Reality In Black and White" (era: Tech Noir)	Jonas Berggren; Tech Noir	Jonas Berggren; Tech Noir	3:11
19.	"Wish You Were Mine" (era: Redefined)	Jonas Berggren; Jenny Berggren; Ekberg; Jakob Petrén	Jonas Berggren; Simon Petrén	3:08
20.	"Couldn't Care Less" (era: Redefined)	Jonas Berggren; Jenny Berggren; Ekberg; J. Petrén	Jonas Berggren; J. Petrén; S. Petrén	3:52
21.	"Stranger to Love (Original Version)" (era: The Bridge/Flowers)	Ekberg; Ballard		3:27
22.	"Giving It Up" (1999 version)	Berggren; Ekberg		3:05
23.	"Moment of Magic" (Alternative Version)	Jonas Berggren; Ekberg; M. Berggren; Jenny Berggren		3:40

== Release history ==
Country	Date	Format	Label	Ref.
Worldwide	6 March 2015	Digital download · CD · LP	Playground	
Austria	3 July 2015	CD	Edel	
Germany	3 July 2015	CD	Edel	
Switzerland	3 July 2015	CD	Edel	
