= The Golden Ratio (album) =

Studio album by Ace of Base
- Released: 24 September 2010
- Recorded: January 2009 – June 2010
- Genres: Pop; Europop; dance; electronic
- Length: 46:53
- Label: Universal

Ace of Base chronology
Platinum & Gold (2010)	The Golden Ratio (2010)	Hidden Gems (2015)

Singles from The Golden Ratio
- 1. "All for You" Released: 10 September 2010

Professional ratings
Review scores
Source	Rating
Allmusic	3.5/5 stars

The Golden Ratio is the fifth studio album by Swedish pop group Ace of Base. It was released on 24 September 2010 through Universal Music Group. Recorded from early 2009 through mid-2010, it is the only album to feature two new vocalists: Clara Hagman and Julia Williamson. Production on this album initially began with former band member and lead vocalist Jenny Berggren, but the resulting sessions were shelved.

The Golden Ratio marks the band's first album of completely new material since 2002's Da Capo. The album entered the German album charts at number 20 and at number 100 in Switzerland.

== Background ==
According to the band, the album was the result of three years of work in the studio. Their main challenge was to find what the Ace of Base sound would be in the second decade of the twenty-first century. After a year of experimenting, they realized they wanted to embrace and preserve the original Ace of Base sound and make it contemporary at the same time." Following the release of the album, an acoustic version was considered but ultimately never recorded.

== Singles ==
The sole single released from the album was "All for You". The song was serviced to European radio stations in mid-July 2010, and was released as a single in digital and physical formats on September 10, 2010. The music video for the song was released on August 27, 2010.

=== Promotional ===
"Mr. Replay" was released as the first promotional single from the album prior to its release and was the first Ace of Base release to feature Clara and Julia. The song appeared on a promotional DJ disc which was released in early July 2010. "Mr. Replay" was described as an "amalgamation of every song Ace of Base has ever recorded" and features guest vocals on verses by Lex Marshall. The song received mixed reviews from critics, who felt it was too similar to their previous material. The song appears in a slightly different format on the album in comparison with the promotional release.

The title track from The Golden Ratio was planned as a future single in Sweden; however, it was only released promotionally and was the final release from the album.

== Reception ==
The Golden Ratio received mostly positive reviews from critics. Rock&Review gave the album a positive review, stating, "Sonically, The Golden Ratio is everything you expect in an Ace of Base album and it's quite hard to tell that Jonas Berggren's sisters are absent as the new vocalists do a great job of filling in where Malin and Jenny left off."

ScandiPop also gave the album very high praise, saying "It's a jaw droppingly good album. They've gone back to everything that made them so brilliant when they first started out in the early nineties."

== Track listing ==
No.	Title	Writer(s)	Producer(s)	Length
1.	"All for You"	Jonas Berggren, Ulf Ekberg, Jonas Saeed	The Sign^{[A]}, Saeed	3:38
2.	"Blah, Blah, Blah on the Radio"	Berggren, Ekberg	The Sign, original co-production Henry Bergström	3:48
3.	"The Golden Ratio"	Berggren, Ekberg, Saeed	The Sign, Saeed	3:47
4.	"Southern California"	Berggren, Ekberg	The Sign, Kasper Lindgren	3:15
5.	"Told My Ma"	Berggren, Ekberg	The Sign, Henry Bergström, Ari Le Tennen	3:50
6.	"Black Sea"	Berggren, Ekberg	The Sign	3:42
7.	"One Day"	Berggren, Ekberg	The Sign, Harry Sommerdahl, original co-production Henry Bergström	3:02
8.	"Juliet"	Henry Bergström, Peter Bergström	Henry Bergström, The Sign, Harry Sommerdahl, Peter Bergström	3:14
9.	"Precious"	Berggren, Ekberg	The Sign, original co-production Henry Bergström	3:52
10.	"Vision in Blue"	Berggren, Ekberg	The Sign, original co-production Henry Bergström	3:56
11.	"Mr. Replay" (featuring Lex Marshall)	Berggren, Ekberg, Ari Lehtonen, D. Massy	The Sign, Ari Le Tennen, Magnus Vänttinen	4:17
12.	"Who Am I"	Berggren, Ekberg	The Sign, One Life Publishing	3:05
13.	"Doreen"	Berggren, Ekberg	The Sign, Ari Le Tennen	3:37

iTunes bonus track
No.	Title	Writer(s)	Length
14.	"All for You" (The Disco Boys Remix)	Berggren, Ekberg	6:02

US iTunes bonus track
No.	Title	Writer(s)	Length
14.	"All for You" (club version)	Berggren, Ekberg	4:03
15.	"All for You" (The Sign Dub Remix)	Berggren, Ekberg	4:42

- ^{^[A]} "The Sign" on this record refers to Jonas Berggren and Ulf Ekberg as a production team.

== Charts ==
Chart	Peak position
German Albums Chart	20
Swiss Albums Chart	100
South Korean Album chart	23
Billboard European Top 100	86
