= Singles of the 90s =

Greatest hits album by Ace of Base
- Released: 15 November 1999
- Recorded: 1992–1999
- Genre: Pop
- Length: 59:42
- Labels: Polydor, Edel-Mega Records
- Producer: Denniz Pop

Ace of Base chronology
Cruel Summer (1998)	Singles of the 90s (1999)	Greatest Hits (2000)

Singles from Singles of the 90s
- 1. "C'est la Vie (Always 21)" Released: 25 October 1999; 2. "Hallo Hallo" Released: 24 January 2000

Professional ratings
Review scores
Source	Rating
Allmusic	4/5 stars
The Encyclopedia of Popular Music	4/5 stars
NME	8/10 stars

Singles of the 90s is a compilation album by Swedish pop music group, Ace of Base.

== Background ==
Singles of the 90s was released on November 15, 1999, in Europe, Asia, and Africa. The band had begun work on their fourth studio album (Da Capo), when they were approached by their label to put out a greatest hits release. Jonas Berggren, the band's main composer, initially refused the offer, claiming the idea for a singles package was premature. In the end, the band relented and offered three songs titled "Hallo Hallo", "C'est La Vie," and "Love in December", which was co-written by all four band members.

An American counterpart, Greatest Hits, was released the following year on April 18, 2000, and included only "C'est La Vie" of the three new tracks. This release included a track error at the beginning of "The Sign" and sold poorly. Singles of the 90s was released in the US via iTunes in 2007 despite the Greatest Hits release.

== Track listing ==
No.	Title	Writer(s)	Producer(s)	Length
1.	"C'est la Vie (Always 21)" (Previously unreleased)	Jonas Berggren	J. Ekgren, S. Pettersen, S. Rösnes	3:27
2.	"The Sign" (from Happy Nation/The Sign)	Jonas Berggren	Denniz Pop, Jonas Berggren, D. Carr	3:08
3.	"Beautiful Life" (from The Bridge)	Jonas Berggren, John Ballard	Denniz Pop, M. Martin, Jonas Berggren	3:39
4.	"Hallo Hallo" (Previously unreleased)	Jonas Berggren	The Trinity Boys	2:51
5.	"Always Have, Always Will" (from Flowers)	Jonas Berggren, Mike Chapman	Ole Evenrude	3:46
6.	"Love in December" (Previously unreleased)	Jonas Berggren, Ulf Ekberg, Jenny Berggren, Linn Berggren	Soulpoets	4:00
7.	"All That She Wants" (from Happy Nation/The Sign)	Jonas Berggren, Ulf Ekberg	Denniz Pop, Jonas Berggren, Ulf Ekberg	3:30
8.	"Living in Danger" (from The Sign)	Jonas Berggren, Ulf Ekberg	Per Adebratt, Tommy Ekman	3:10
9.	"Everytime It Rains" (from Cruel Summer)	Rick Nowels, Billy Steinberg, Maria Vidal	Cutfather & Joe	3:55
10.	"Don't Turn Around" (from Happy Nation/The Sign)	Albert Hammond, Diane Warren	Per Adebratt, Tommy Ekman	3:51
11.	"Cruel Summer (Big Bonus Mix)" (from Flowers/Cruel Summer)	Sara Dallin, Siobhan Fahey, Keren Woodward, Anthony Swain, Steve Jolley	Stephen Hague, Jonas Berggren, Ulf Ekberg, Johnny Jam & Delgado	4:07
12.	"Happy Nation (Radio Edit)" (from Happy Nation/The Sign)	Jonas Berggren, Ulf Ekberg	Jonas Berggren; Ulf Ekberg	3:32
13.	"Lucky Love" (from The Bridge)	Jonas Berggren, Billy Steinberg	Denniz Pop, Max Martin, Jonas Berggren	2:52
14.	"Never Gonna Say I'm Sorry (Long Version)" (from The Bridge)	Jonas Berggren	Denniz Pop, Max Martin, Jonas Berggren	6:33
15.	"Life Is a Flower" (from Flowers)	Jonas Berggren	P. Adebratt, T. Ekman, Jonas Berggren	3:47
16.	"Wheel of Fortune (7″ Mix)" (from Happy Nation/The Sign)	Jonas Berggren, Ulf Ekberg	Jonas Berggren, Ulf Ekberg, TOEC	3:40

Japanese edition
No.	Title	Length
17.	"Megamix (Long Version)"	7:20

== Charts ==
Chart	Peak position
Austrian Albums Chart	32
Danish Albums Chart	33
Finnish Albums Chart	29
French Albums Chart	25
German Albums Chart	21
Hungarian Albums Chart	39
Japanese Albums Chart	23
Norwegian Albums Chart	35
Spanish Albums Chart	24
Swiss Albums Chart	14
Swedish Albums Chart	36
UK Albums Chart	62

== Certifications ==
Region	Certification	Certified units/sales
Denmark (IFPI Danmark)	Platinum	50,000^{^}
Japan (RIAJ)	Platinum	200,000^{^}
^{^} Shipments figures based on certification alone.
