= Greatest Hits (2000 Ace of Base album) =

Compilation album by Ace of Base

Greatest hits album by Ace of Base
- Released: 18 April 2000
- Recorded: 1992–1999
- Genre: Pop
- Length: 47:56
- Label: Arista

Ace of Base chronology
Singles of the 90s (1999)	Greatest Hits (2000)	Da Capo (2002)

Professional ratings
Review scores
Source	Rating
AllMusic	4/5 stars
The Encyclopedia of Popular Music	4/5 stars
Entertainment Weekly	B
The Rolling Stone Album Guide	3.5/5 stars

Greatest Hits is a compilation album by the Swedish group Ace of Base.

== Background ==
Greatest Hits was the North American counterpart to the international album, Singles of the 90s. Greatest Hits was released by Arista Records on 18 April 2000, fulfilling their contractual obligations with the group and ending their relationship.

It contained a track error on "The Sign" (which cut one second from the beginning of the song) and only one new track, "C'est La Vie (Always 21)", which was also featured on Singles of the 90s along with two other new tracks. "Life Is a Flower", which was previously withheld from the Cruel Summer album in favor of "Whenever You're Near Me" for being "too European in nature" was made available to American audiences for the first time on this compilation. The release includes a new remix of "Everytime It Rains" by Metro, however there is no indication on the packaging that the song is a remix, and the running time listed matches the running time of the original radio edit (3:55), rather than the remix's actual running time of 4:17.

The remix was released to US radio outlets in March 2000 as the only form of promotion for the album. The song failed to gain airplay and with no additional promotion, the album failed to enter the Billboard U.S. album charts, selling fewer than 5,000 copies in its first week of release. It was the first Ace of Base album to fail to chart.

== Track listing ==
1. "All That She Wants" – 3:30
2. "The Sign" – 3:08
3. "Everytime It Rains" (Metro Radio Mix) – 4:17
4. "Beautiful Life" – 3:40
5. "Cruel Summer" – 3:33
6. "Don't Turn Around" – 3:48
7. "Lucky Love" (acoustic version) – 2:52
8. "Always Have Always Will" – 3:44
9. "Life Is a Flower" – 3:44
10. "C'est la Vie (Always 21)" – 3:26
11. "Lucky Love" (Frankie Knuckles Mix) – 3:41
12. "Beautiful Life" (Junior Vasquez Mix) – 8:25
