= Hallo Hallo (Ace of Base song) =

2000 single by Ace of Base

Single by Ace of Base

from the album Singles of the 90s
- Released: 24 January 2000
- Genre: Pop
- Length: 2:52
- Label: Mega
- Songwriter: Jonas Berggren

Ace of Base singles chronology
"C'est la Vie (Always 21)" (1999)	"Hallo Hallo" (2000)	"Beautiful Morning" (2002)

"Hallo Hallo" is the third single from Ace of Base's greatest hits record Singles of the 90s. The song was released in 2000 in Germany, Spain, and Scandinavia. The song was also featured on their greatest hits: Greatest Hits (2008 Ace of Base album), and 2019’s Ace of Base Gold compilation album.

The song appeared in the American Adam Sandler film You Don't Mess with the Zohan.

== Background ==
The song was originally recorded with lead vocals by Jonas for Cruel Summer / Flowers. According to Jonas, "it wasn't ready in time." The song was re-recorded with Jenny and Linn on lead vocals for Singles of the 90s. The Hitvision Remix of Hallo Hallo was meant to be a single from Greatest Hits with yet again re-recorded vocals, this time with Jenny almost completely taking over lead vocal duties. A sample of the song appeared on the band's American web page, retitled Hello Hello, yet the inclusion and single release was canceled when Arista head Clive Davis insisted that "Everytime It Rains" be remixed and released instead.

== Tracklistings ==
Scandinavia

CD Single

1. Hallo Hallo (Radio Version)
2. Hallo Hallo (Hitvision Radio Edit)

CD Maxi/German Maxi

1. Hallo Hallo (Radio Version)
2. Hallo Hallo (Hitvision Radio Edit)
3. Hallo Hallo (Original Version)
4. Hallo Hallo (Dub)

Spain

CD Maxi

1. Hallo Hallo (Xtm Full Remix)
2. Hallo Hallo (Xtm Dub Remix)
3. Hallo Hallo (Xtm Radio Remix)
4. Hallo Hallo (Hitvision Radio Edit)

== Official Versions/Remixes ==
- Album Version
- Radio Version
- Hitvision Radio Edit
- XTM Radio Remix
- XTM Full Remix
- XTM Dub Remix
- Dub

== Release history ==
Region	Date	Label
Sweden	24 January 2000	Mega
Germany	10 April 2000	Polydor
Spain	15 May 2000	Polydor

== Charts ==
Chart	Peak position
Finnish Singles Chart	12
German Singles Chart	99
Romanian Singles Chart	3
Romanian Airplay Chart	17
Spanish Los 40 Principales Chart	21
