= Ace of Base =

Swedish pop group

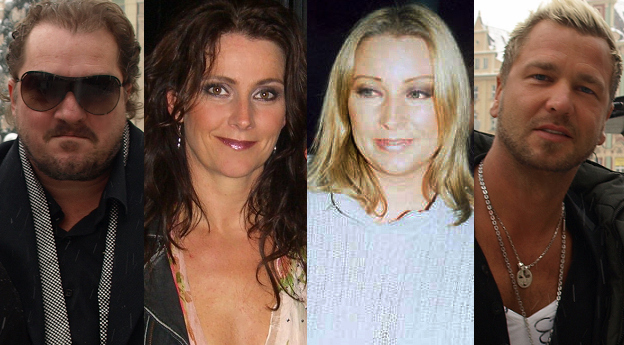
- The founding members of Ace of Base (L–R) Jonas "Joker" Berggren, Jenny Berggren, Malin "Linn" Berggren, and Ulf "Buddha" Ekberg

Background information
- Origin: Gothenburg, Sweden
- Genres: Pop; dance-pop; Euro-pop
- Works: Discography; songs
- Years active: 1990–present
- Labels: Mega; Barclay; Metronome; Arista; BMG; Polydor; Universal; Playground
- Members: Jonas Berggren; Ulf Ekberg
- Past members: Linn Berggren; Jenny Berggren; Clara Hagman; Julia Williamson
- Website: aceofbase.com

Ace of Base are a Swedish pop music group formed in Gothenburg in 1990. Originally consisting of siblings Jonas, Linn, and Jenny Berggren along with Ulf Ekberg, they achieved worldwide success following the release of their debut album Happy Nation in 1992. Later reissued as The Sign it was certified nine-times platinum in the United States. Not only was it the best-selling album of 1994 but also one of the most successful debut albums of all time, being the first to produce three No. 1 singles on the Billboard Mainstream Top 40 chart: "All That She Wants", "The Sign", and "Don't Turn Around".

The group continued to score hit singles throughout the 1990s with "Beautiful Life", "Lucky Love", "Cruel Summer", and "Life Is a Flower". They have sold 30 million copies of their first four studio albums, making them the third most successful Swedish group of all time, behind ABBA and Roxette.

Despite being largely inactive since 2012, the group has never officially disbanded. In the last decade they have released several demo tracks, first via their Facebook page and later in 2015 on the compilation album Hidden Gems. A follow-up titled Hidden Gems, Vol. 2 was included in the 2020 box set All That She Wants: The Classic Collection. Jenny Berggren continues to perform the group's hits in solo concerts around the world.

== History ==
=== 1987–1992: Formation ===
In 1987 after several years as part of a new wave and punk cover band called G Konrad (named after Hungarian author György Konrád), Jonas Berggren formed a band with two friends, Johnny Lindén and Niklas Tränk, for a school project; his sisters Linn and Jenny later joined as vocalists. The new band went through several names: Kalinin Prospect, after an avenue in Moscow; CAD (Computer-Aided Disco); and Tech-Noir, which is French for black technology, inspired by a nightclub in the film The Terminator. They toured the clubs of Sweden with original material, techno tracks inspired by 1980s Italo disco and house music.

Johnny left the group in 1989, and Niklas made his departure known by failing to turn up at a gig at Bältespännarparken in Gothenburg on 4 August 1990, instead attending a Rolling Stones concert across town. Jonas asked his friend Ulf Ekberg to stand in for Niklas. Inspired by a Jamaican reggae band who resided in a studio next door to theirs, they experimented with a fusion of reggae and pop – dubbed "China reggae" by their Jamaican friends – which became the band's trademark sound.

After responding to an ad in the paper Göteborgs-Posten, the new quartet began working in the studio with record producer John Ballard. They decided to adopt a new name to make a fresh start, as well as to avoid confusion with another band called Tech Noir who were attracting bad reviews. Linn said, "No one could pronounce the name of the group and nobody could remember it." They settled on Ace of Base in early 1991 after Ulf was inspired by the Motörhead song "Ace of Spades". In a 2018 interview Ulf explained: "I was hungover, watching MTV, and I saw Motörhead's video for their song 'Ace of Spades'. I liked the name and I thought I'd play around with those words. [...] Then I thought of our studio and how it's our base".

The group continued performing in the clubs of Gothenburg but struggled to gain recognition, partly due to the local preference for heavy metal music over techno. They sent out demo cassettes to numerous record companies, but all received refusals. In May 1991 Jonas and Ulf travelled to various record companies in Stockholm, including Polar Music, which requested that they record more songs first, and SweMix, which expressed interest but did not have the capacity to work with them until autumn.

In July Klas Lunding at Telegram Records arranged for the group to record a new version of "Wheel of Fortune" in their newly renovated Decibel Studio but did not offer them a recording contract. Jonas recounts:

When it had just been finished, Martin Dodd (Head of A&R at independent Danish label Mega Records) called and shouted, "Do not sign anything, do not sign anything!" They wanted everything from us, while Telegram only wanted the reggae songs and no up-tempos. We had already recorded a single with Telegram but hadn't signed anything. Klas is not the fastest in the world, so to speak – and that was perhaps lucky for us. So Mega bought the master tape from Klas for 34,000 SEK.

"Wheel of Fortune" was serviced to radio and nightclubs in Sweden in early 1992, reaching Gothenburg's local Jockeytoppen chart in March, which led to an invitation to perform on the music television channel ZTV. However, the record failed to gain traction in Sweden, prompting Mega to shift focus to Denmark. After servicing the single to media three times, it was finally released commercially at the end of June 1992, entering the Danish singles chart at No. 6 before rising to No. 2.

=== 1992–1994: International success with Happy Nation and The Sign ===
Following the success of "Wheel of Fortune" in Denmark, the group continued to work on new music. After hearing Kayo's "Another Mother" in a record store – a top-20 hit in Sweden in 1990 – Jonas and Ulf decided that it was the exact sound they wanted to create.

In early 1992, they sent producer Denniz PoP a demo tape that included a song titled "Mr. Ace". Initially, he was not particularly impressed, but the tape became stuck in the cassette player of his car. As a result, he had to listen to it repeatedly and gradually realized the song's potential. Although he had lost the band's contact details, when they called him a few months later, he invited them to his SweMix studio to re-record the song in July 1992. The song was eventually titled "All That She Wants" and, upon its release at the end of August, it quickly ascended to No. 1 on the Danish chart, while the previous single remained at No. 2. Eager to release an LP for the Christmas market, Mega Records pressured the band for an album, which was recorded and mixed in just a few weeks.

The album, Happy Nation, was released on 2 November 1992, in Denmark, and its success generated interest throughout Europe. A pan-European license was signed with Metronome/PolyGram (now Universal Music), but the American division declined to pursue the band. Within a few months, "All That She Wants" reached No. 3 in Sweden and spent eight weeks at No. 1 in Germany. In various European countries, "Happy Nation" and "Waiting for Magic" were released as additional singles following the album's release.

In May 1993, "All That She Wants" solidified its European success by topping the charts for three weeks in the United Kingdom. However, despite Mega Records's efforts to secure a distribution deal in the United States, the response was always the same: "This band will never work in the States." Eventually, Clive Davis, founder of Arista Records, heard the song playing on the radio whilst on vacation on his yacht, and rushed to sign a licence with Mega for the Americas. In October and November 1993, "All That She Wants" reached No. 2 on the Billboard Hot 100, as well as in Australia.

The group had already started work on a second album, with the working title of The Sign, named after one of the new tracks they had written. However, concerned about the sales of import copies of Happy Nation, Davis decided to modify the track list of the original LP by adding three new tracks and re-titling it The Sign. Released in the US on 23 November 1993, the album remained in the top three of the Billboard Top 200 for 26 consecutive weeks and was nominated for Best Pop Album at the 1995 Grammy Awards. The updated album was released in Europe as Happy Nation (US Version). Collectively, the various versions of the album reached the No. 1 position in at least 14 countries and sold over 21 million copies worldwide, making it one of the best-selling debut albums of all time. It was also one of the best-selling albums of 1994.

The second U.S. single was the album's title track, "The Sign", released on 14 December. It proved to be even more successful than the first single, spending six weeks at No. 1 and becoming the best-selling single of 1994. The song also achieved significant international success, peaking at No. 2 in both the UK and Sweden, and reaching No. 1 in Germany; in Australia, it topped the charts for four weeks. At the request of Clive Davis, the group's next single was "Don't Turn Around". This song had previously been released by Tina Turner as the B-side of her single "Typical Male" (1986) and had reached No. 1 in the UK for Aswad in 1988. The cover version achieved top 5 placements in the US, UK, Sweden, Denmark, and Finland. Promotion for the album concluded with the final single release, "Living in Danger", which also became a top 40 hit internationally and was performed in front of the Brandenburg Gate at the first-ever MTV Europe Music Awards in Berlin in November 1994.

The band became embroiled in controversy when, on 27 March 1993, the Swedish newspaper Expressen reported that Ulf had been a member of a skinhead gang during his teenage years, prior to his association with Ace of Base. Linn commented in 1993, "Ulf gave all that up long ago, and my family had nothing to do with any of that in the first place." In 2013, the story resurfaced in a report by Vice, which referenced an unauthorized CD released in 1998 titled Uffe Was a Nazi!, containing songs with racist content purportedly recorded by Ulf's former band, "Commit Suiside". Ulf was described as "a drug and alcohol-abusing teenager, when he was a member of a neo-Nazi skinhead gang". In response, Ekberg denied that Commit Suiside wrote or performed the racist songs released on Uffe was a Nazi!, and described the band as "a New Wave music band creating and performing electronic music on synthesizers without any political touch or agenda." In an interview with E!, Ulf stated, "I have always been deeply regretful of that period in my life, as I strive to bring happiness to people, and during that period, I did not live up to that standard. [...] I'm truly deeply sorry for any hurt and disappointment this has caused for our fans, and I really hope that we clearly have stated that Ace of Base never shared any of these opinions and strongly oppose all extremist opinions on both the right and left wing."

In April 1994, an obsessed German fan broke into the Berggren family home, brandishing a knife. After managing to restrain her, the band decided they needed bodyguards. Recalling the attack in a 2016 interview, Jenny said:

"She woke me up with a knife to my throat. She broke into my parents' house when I was staying there after two years away. I woke up and she was standing over me with the knife. I was terrified. That was the darker side of fame. I remember just after I was attacked I found out that we were Number 1 in the United States. All I could think was that I almost got killed. Everyone was like, 'wow, let's have a huge party'. I didn't want a party. I was broken."

=== 1995–1997: The Bridge ===
Following the substantial success of their debut album, the group was offered the opportunity to perform at Madison Square Garden in New York and asked to represent brands such as Pepsi and Reebok in promotional campaigns. However, after two years of traveling the world to promote their first album, the band was too exhausted to accept any of these offers. Simultaneously, their various record companies worldwide were demanding a second album promptly. To expedite the process, instead of Jonas and Ulf writing most of the album, each member was encouraged to submit their own tracks for consideration.

Ultimately, 17 tracks were selected for the second album, titled The Bridge. This album marked a significant shift in sound; alongside the reggae and dance styles that had propelled the group to fame, it featured more experimental tracks and several ballads. The lead single, "Lucky Love," was a mainstream pop record that premiered in August 1995 at the World Championships in Athletics in Gothenburg. It debuted at No. 1 in Sweden upon its release in October, becoming their first chart-topper in their homeland. Additionally, it was a top 20 hit across Europe, peaking at No. 1 in Finland, No. 2 in Denmark, No. 13 in Germany, and No. 20 in the United Kingdom.

Arista Records instead opted for the more up-tempo track "Beautiful Life" as the first single in the US, where it peaked at No. 15 on the Billboard Hot 100, becoming the first American and UK hit for its co-producer Max Martin. It was released as the second single from the album in most countries, also reaching No. 15 in the UK and charting in at least 17 countries. An alternative acoustic mix of "Lucky Love" was chosen as the second U.S. single, peaking at No. 30. "Never Gonna Say I'm Sorry" was released as the third single from the album and achieved moderate success in Europe, but failed to chart on the Hot 100 in the US. The Bridge was certified platinum in 14 countries, although it did not match the sales of the group's debut album. In February 1996, the band performed at the Viña del Mar International Song Festival in Chile, headlining alongside 2 Unlimited.

After touring Asia and Australasia in April 1996, the group temporarily withdrew from the limelight, scrapping plans to release either "My Déjà Vu" or "Edge of Heaven" as singles. They re-emerged only in 1997 for an April performance at the World Music Awards and a July concert celebrating the 20th birthday of Princess Victoria of Sweden.

=== 1998–2000: Flowers / Cruel Summer, Singles of the 90s, and Greatest Hits ===
Having felt rushed to record a second album, the group were given as much time as they need to produce their third, with much of it being recorded in Jonas's own studio, The Barn. Declaring it their best album yet, the group titled it Flowers because they believed that the songs, wildly different in style, including Motown and gospel influences, resembled a varied bouquet of flowers.

In live performances in support of the album, Linn relinquished lead vocal duties to sister Jenny, and on many promotional photos, Linn's face was blurred. Fans were reassured that Linn was happy with her new backing role in the group, and many reasons were given for her decision, including her having damaged her voice, her aerophobia deterring her from international travel, dealing with depression, and her dislike of fame. Her vocal contributions to the album itself were also diminished, though she still appeared on the majority of the tracks.

Linn has relinquished the role of front vocalist and delegated her singing duties to sister Jenny. Linn has had recurrent problems with her voice since album II, The Bridge, and would not be able to withstand the rigors of touring. As it represents a significant change, the band has decided to concentrate all visual attention on Jenny for the time being.

— Ace of Base website, 1998

The album's lead single, "Life Is a Flower", was released in mainland Europe in April 1998, and became the most-played track on European radio of the year. It reached the top 5 in Sweden, Denmark, Finland, Hungary and in the UK, where it was certified silver. The album followed in June, hitting the top 20 in at least a dozen countries. The group's British label London Records had requested the band record the 1983 hit "Cruel Summer" by Bananarama and it was selected as the second European single. Deciding that "Life Is a Flower" was "too European in nature", Clive Davis pushed "Cruel Summer" as the lead single for the United States, and it brought Ace of Base back into the U.S. Top 10 for the first time in four years, being certified gold. The album was also renamed Cruel Summer and featured a different track list from the European release. For this version of the album, Davis persuaded a reluctant Linn to record the Billy Steinberg-penned ballad "Everytime It Rains". "Life Is a Flower" was re-recorded as "Whenever You're Near Me" and chosen as the second single from Cruel Summer, peaking at No. 76. "Travel to Romantis" and "Always Have, Always Will" were further singles in Europe whilst "Everytime It Rains" was issued as a single in the UK along with a repackaged edition of Flowers.

The group returned to the studio in 1999, writing several tracks together as a quartet for the first time and recording enough demo tracks for consideration for a fourth studio album. Ulf later revealed that they had hoped to release a track called "Pole Position" as the lead single, with a music video featuring the Formula One champion driver Jacques Villeneuve. Several of the tracks recorded for the scrapped studio album were eventually released in demo form by Jonas via Facebook in 2011.

In November 1999, Mega Records released the best-of album Singles of the 90s, a compilation of 13 singles and 3 new songs. A new single taken from it, "C'est La Vie (Always 21)", was a modest chart hit in Sweden, Finland, Germany and Switzerland, and topped the charts in Spain. "Hallo Hallo" followed as the second single in parts of Europe, but only found minor success. Arista Records fulfilled the group's four-album contract in the Americas by releasing Greatest Hits in March 2000. A new dance mix of "Everytime It Rains", previously included on Cruel Summer, was released as a radio single to promote the album. Both the single and album failed to chart in the USA.

=== 2002–2003: Da Capo ===
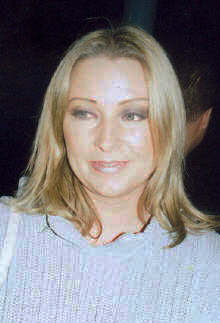
Linn after a performance in 2002

After a lengthy absence from the pop scene, a new single titled "Beautiful Morning" was released to radio in Europe in July 2002. Polydor Records announced that it was their fastest-added track to radio playlists for the year, eventually reaching No. 38 in Germany and No. 14 in Sweden upon its commercial release in September.

After several delays, Ace of Base finally released their fourth studio album, Da Capo, on September 30, 2002, in Europe, and in Japan through Toshiba EMI with a different cover and three bonus tracks. The album received only a soft release in the United Kingdom and was not released in the Americas. The title comes from the musical term da capo, which translates as "back to the beginning", as the sound of the album was meant to be a return to the group's early blend of reggae and europop. Although the album charted across much of Europe, it was not as successful as previous releases. Only Jenny and Ulf went on a promotional tour of Sweden, Denmark, Norway, Finland, Germany, Poland and Austria. Jonas chose to forego promotional activities because "it was better to be two then" and led to "less questions" about Linn's lack of participation. Linn attended only one performance in Germany, which was her last public appearance.

"The Juvenile" was chosen as the album's second single in Germany and was featured in a Christmas campaign by TV channel RTL Television. The song is a rewritten version of a track originally submitted for the James Bond film GoldenEye in 1995. However, Clive Davis advised the band that it was not the best move for them at the time, leading to its withdrawal from consideration. In Scandinavia, Edel-Mega released "Unspeakable" as the second single; however, its poor chart performance resulted in the premature end of the album's promotion.

=== 2003–2009: Hiatus and reunion ===
The group remained out of the spotlight throughout 2003 and 2004. During this time, Jenny performed solo live performances in several Christian shows with her husband, Jakob Petrén, and released an album as a vocalist with the Swedish group Arose.

In 2005, several songs featuring vocals by both Jenny and Linn were recorded with producer Tommy Ekman, including "Would You Believe" and "Make My Day". Jonas and Ulf later explained that the group did not have the energy to finish the project, though the tracks that were recorded eventually surfaced. At the end of 2005, the group reunited, without Linn, for several live performances at the Night of the Proms in Belgium, alongside other artists such as Donna Summer.

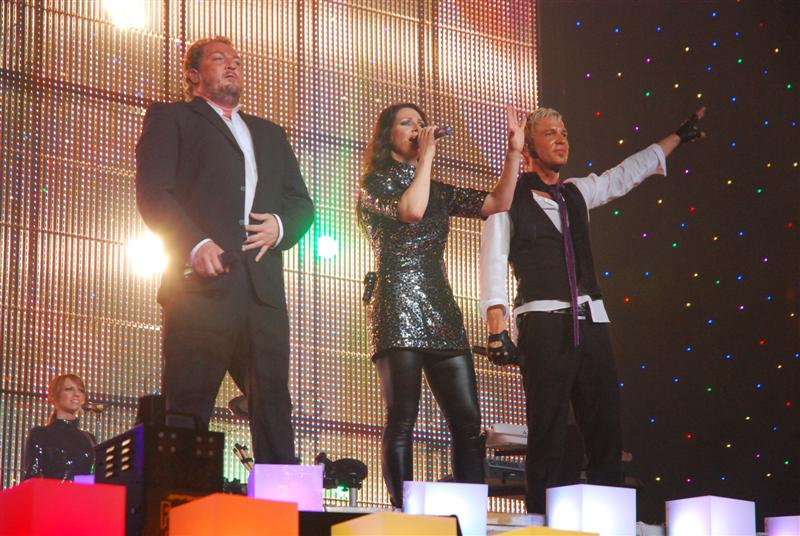
Jonas, Jenny and Ulf during a concert in Saint Petersburg, 2007.

Ace of Base reunited as a trio to perform their first full-length concert since 1996 in Yekaterinburg, Russia, on 15 November 2007. They embarked on a world tour called Ace of Base - Redefined!, which continued throughout 2008 and 2009. The set list included several new versions of their greatest hits. Jenny confirmed Linn's permanent departure from the group, saying "She hasn't been part of Ace of Base for several years" in Se & Hør magazine. Ulf later explained in an interview "She left the band and we promised her to never even ask to come back. She's done with entertainment industry. It's understandable. It's brutal from the inside, it was not for her. She has no craving to be famous, she loved her fans, but the fame factor was not for her." While touring, the group performed a brand new song called "Sparks From A Fire".

The group collaborated with Jenny's husband, Jakob, to record material for a new studio album, which was intended to include seven new songs and seven remakes of old hits. However, this album did not see a release and a new compilation, Greatest Hits, was released on 12 November 2008, instead. Five re-recorded songs were released from the album in various forms: "Lucky Love 2009", "Don't Turn Around 2009", "The Sign (Freedom Bunch Mix)" and "Wheel of Fortune 2009", which was released worldwide on 24 October 2008, as a digital single. A fifth reworking, "Happy Nation 2009", was released separately as a remix kit. A remake of "All That She Wants" was also recorded and featured guest vocals by Britney Spears that stemmed from her own 2007 cover of the song. This remake was never officially released, but leaked online in June 2016. Three of the new tracks recorded in this period ("Sparks From A Fire", "The Mask" and "Wish You Were Mine") were posted on YouTube in 2017.

=== 2009–2012: New members, The Golden Ratio, and Ace Thursdays ===
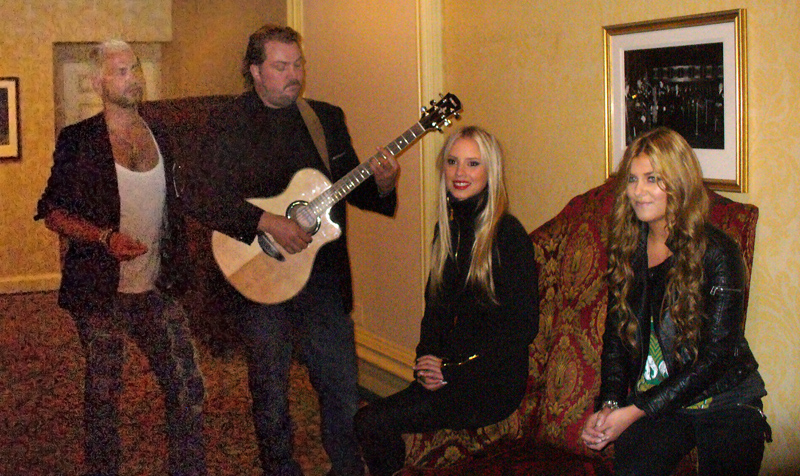
Ace of Base performing during a fan meeting in Toronto, Canada (2010).

In August 2009, in an interview with Digital Spy, Ulf mentioned adding another singer to the group alongside Jenny, explaining: "We're just deciding now whether to add a fourth member to the group again or to bring it out under a new name. At the moment, we think it would be stronger with two female singers, so it's a little technical problem to solve." During this time, Ulf and Jonas began recording songs with singer Julia Williamson, whom they met through Martin Dodd, who had originally signed the group to Mega Records. Meanwhile, a new remix of "Cruel Summer" by Rico Bernasconi charted at No. 69 in Germany.

Jenny published her autobiography Vinna hela Världen in Sweden in September and announced that she was recording a solo album, which materialized in October 2010 as My Story. In November 2009, Jenny confirmed via Twitter that she would not be involved with the upcoming album, but later clarified that she had not left, saying that "other constellations will have other names". In a 2010 interview with Aftonbladet, Jenny claimed "They didn't want to be with me", and that she was not allowed to participate in songwriting. Jonas and Ulf then said in an interview with Scandipop that Jenny wasn't happy with plans to introduce a new member, and while she never formally quit the group, they felt that they had no choice but to proceed without her.

Two new singers were revealed in February 2010: Clara Hagman from Gävle (Clara Fredrika Hagman, also known as Clara Mae, b. July 9, 1991), a contestant from Idol 2009, whom Ulf met whilst appearing as a guest judge on the show; and Julia Williamson from Kristianstad (Julia Ibolya Williamson, b. August 25, 1983).

The new quartet maintained the original band name, but it was stylized as "Ace.of.Base" on the artwork of single and album releases. In July 2010, a track called "Mr. Replay" appeared on a Polish promo compilation for DJs, becoming the first release from the new line-up. The first official single from the line-up, "All for You", was premiered on radio station Antenne AC on July 22, and was released on CD and download on September 10, debuting at No. 38 in Germany. The album The Golden Ratio followed on September 24, entering the German album charts at No. 20. In Sweden, the album failed to chart, backed only by a radio release of the album's title track "The Golden Ratio" in October, followed by a performance of "Southern California" on Bingolotto in April 2011. An acoustic version of the album was being considered, but did never materialize. No further singles were released in support of the album.

In March 2011, Jonas began releasing previously unreleased material to fans via the band's official Facebook page and the website ReverbNation on a semi-regular basis, in events they referred to as "Ace Thursdays". Writing sessions for new material took place throughout the same year, but following the group's tour of Canada and Brazil in 2011, new music was put on hold.

=== 2012–present: Departures, Hidden Gems and 30th anniversary ===
Ace Thursdays continued throughout 2012, but were discontinued in May 2013. In November 2012, Jenny was quoted as saying, "The rest of the band are doing other things. ... We're just wishing each other luck at this stage. I have a dream that we'll get back together, so I don't want to bang anyone on the head". Jenny began touring as "Jenny from Ace of Base" alongside popular Eurodance acts from the decade.

In January 2014, Julia announced that she had left the group in 2012. She later confirmed that Clara had also left, saying "I never really left the group, one day I just didn't hear anything from them and it's the same with Clara. Like it went up in smoke; really strange". Clara has since released several solo singles, and has collaborated with various EDM producers such as KREAM and R3hab.

A remix EP was released in July 2014, featuring new remixes of "All That She Wants". In December 2014 and January 2015, remastered versions of their first four studio albums, in both European and American editions, were released digitally. This was followed in March by Hidden Gems, a compilation album consisting entirely of demos and b-sides. "Would You Believe", one of the last tracks recorded by the original quartet in 2005, was released as a promotional single. The band filmed a multi-part documentary titled "The Story" at Google Headquarters that was posted on YouTube in March 2015. It also aired on Swedish television.

In a 2015 interview with ABC News, Ulf remarked on the possibility of a future reunion, stating, "With the right elements in the next few years, I don't think it's impossible"; however, in July 2016, Jenny remarked: "We won't re-form. [...] We're finished working together but we're not finished being family together. We have a lot of fun plans in the future but no musical plans". In 2018, Jonas said a potential reunion had been discussed, but noted "We always got the same question "where is Malin?". I am still writing music, maybe one song each fortnight or something. It's a lot of fun, like therapy. And maybe if we do a reunion... I have songs for it!"

In 2019, Demon Music Group began releasing new compilations of the band's material in the United Kingdom. The first of these releases was Ace of Base – Gold, which charted at No. 59 in the UK, marking the group's first return to the UK charts in 20 years. To mark the group's 30th anniversary, a 12-disc box set called All That She Wants: The Classic Collection was released in July 2020. The set includes expanded versions of the group's original four studio albums and Hidden Gems, Hidden Gems, Vol. 2 (a new follow-up to the original Hidden Gems), an EP containing previously unreleased remixes of "Edge Of Heaven", and a DVD containing all of the group's music videos. Included among the 195 tracks are previously unreleased demos from the original line-up's final recording sessions in 2008 and live recordings of the group's first gig at Bältespännarparken in 1990. There is also a 4 LP coloured vinyl version of the box set, which only includes the four studio albums. Hidden Gems, Vol. 2 was released digitally in August 2020.

In 2020, Playground Records began releasing standalone digital singles which feature new remixes of the group's tracks. In November 2021, a remix EP was released for the album track "Dancer in a Daydream" which first appeared on Happy Nation in 1992. The EP features remixes by producer Trace Adam and was released alongside a new video with previously unseen footage.

On 28 April 2023, the group released a 26-compact disc singles box set, Beautiful Life: The Singles. A three-part documentary series, All That She Wants, produced by Viaplay, was announced on 21 November 2023. The series premiered in April 2024.

The group was inducted into the Swedish Music Hall of Fame in September 2024.

The first-ever double vinyl release of the group's sophomore album, The Bridge, was announced on 30 October 2025, to commentate the album's 30th anniversary. It was released on 30 January 2026.

== Legacy ==
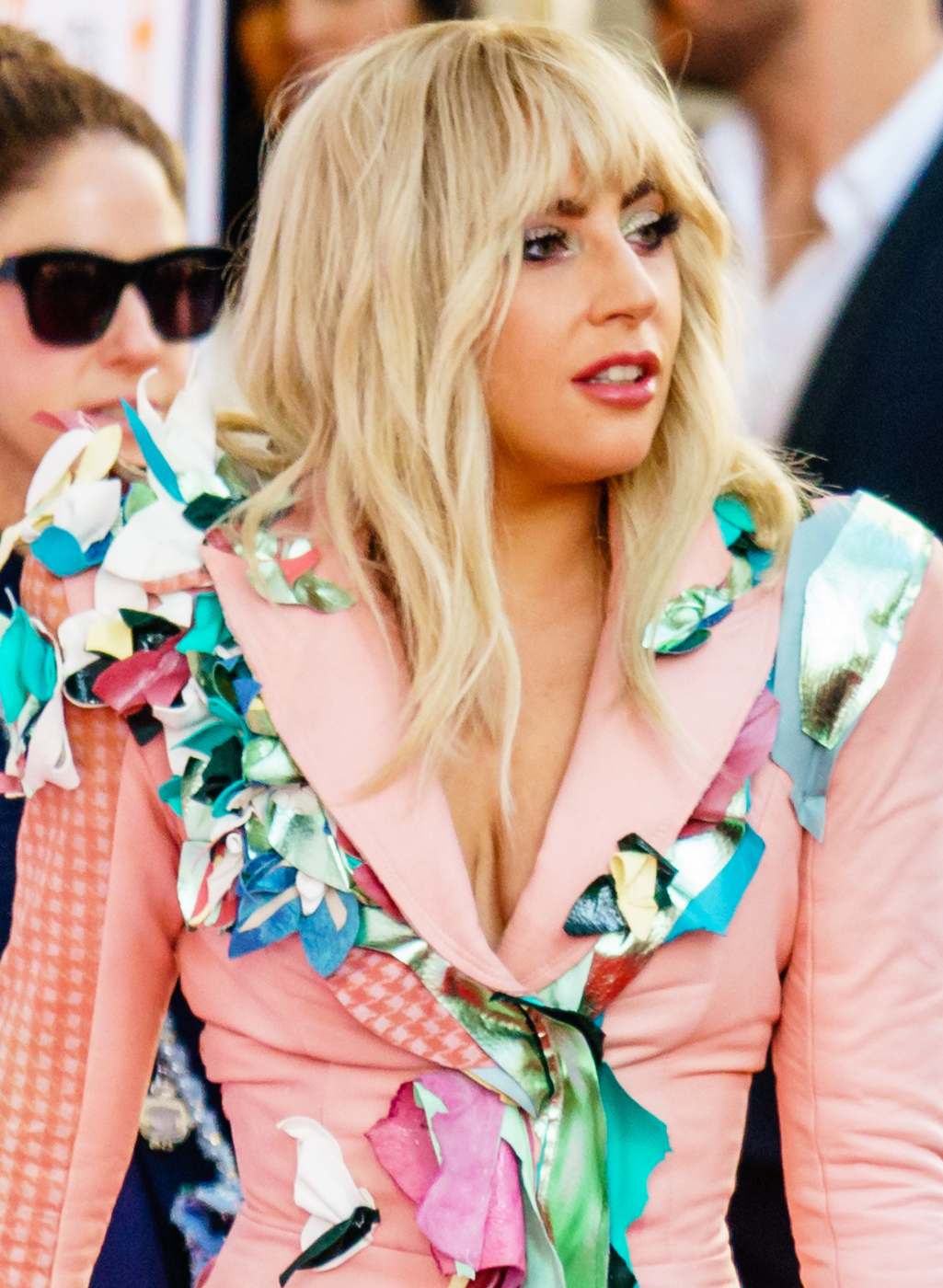
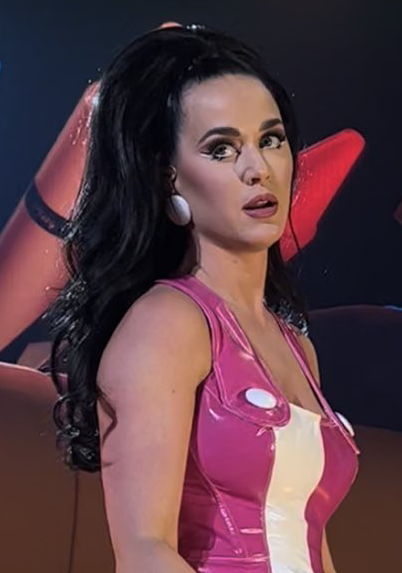
Musicians including Lady Gaga (left) and Katy Perry (right) have cited Ace of Base as influences.

Several musicians and singers have been influenced by Ace of Base. Lady Gaga has said her album The Fame Monster was influenced by the "super pop melodies of the 90s" by acts such as Ace of Base. The song "Alejandro" in particular has been heavily compared to Ace of Base's version of "Don't Turn Around"; Paul Lester from BBC commented that "[Alejandro] moves at an Ace of Base pace", and Sal Cinquemani from Slant Magazine described the song as a homage to them; The song "Eh, Eh (Nothing Else I Can Say)" from The Fame has also been linked to the band; Alexis Petridis from The Guardian noted that the song "is the first song in a long time that warrants comparison to the œuvre of Ace of Base".

Katy Perry said she wanted her third studio album, Teenage Dream, to sound like "The Sign". In 2010, Perry said of the album: "It's what I said I wanted earlier....We nailed it: It's roller-skating! It's '90s! It's Ace of Base! It's Cyndi Lauper! It's like all these colors and more". Robyn said she was inspired by Ace of Base for her song "Dancehall Queen", which was produced by Diplo and Klas Åhlund for her fifth studio album Body Talk Pt. 1, saying: "We were just having fun with that kind of genre music. And the idea of making this song came out of that discussion. It was fun".

Some of Clean Bandit's tracks have been compared to the band, notably their 2016 UK No. 1 single "Rockabye". Band members have named them as an influence in interviews. Tegan and Sara's song "Closer" was inspired by the band's music. Robert Alfons of Canadian synthpop group Trust said he was influenced by the synthesizers used by Ace of Base. Yeasayer and Twin Shadow have both also cited Ace of Base as an influence.

In 1995, a cover of "The Sign" was featured in the American sitcom Full House in the final season episode "We Got the Beat". In the episode, Jodie Sweetin in character as Stephanie Tanner performs the song with her fictional band Girl Talk. Indie rock band The Mountain Goats included a cover of "The Sign" by Ace of Base on their 1995 EP Songs For Peter Hughes. The group has continued to play versions of it at live shows. Beck had plans to cover an Ace of Base album as part of his Beck's Record Club project in 2009, but this never came to fruition. "The Sign" was covered by fictional a cappella group the Barden Bellas in the 2012 film Pitch Perfect and appears on the soundtrack for the movie. The 2019 single "Liar" by Cuban pop singer Camila Cabello interpolates the melody of "All That She Wants".

== Band members ==
Current members

- Jonas Berggren – keyboards, guitars, vocals, programming, production (1990–present)
- Ulf Ekberg – keyboards, vocals, programming, production (1990–present)

Former members

- Linn Berggren – vocals, keyboards (1990–2007)
- Jenny Berggren – vocals (1990–2009)
- Clara Hagman – vocals (2009–12)
- Julia Williamson – vocals (2009–12)

Despite her status as a former member, Jenny Berggren has stated in numerous interviews that she has never left the band and has further stated that all four original members are still members of the Ace of Base brand by agreement and legal documents.

== Awards and nominations ==
Award	Year	Nominee(s)	Category	Result	Ref.
American Music Awards	1995	Ace of Base	Favorite Pop/Rock Band/Duo/Group	Won	
American Music Awards	1995	Ace of Base	Favorite Pop/Rock New Artist	Won	
American Music Awards	1995	"The Sign"	Favorite Pop/Rock Single	Nominated	
BMI London Awards	2007	"The Sign"	3 Million Award	Won	
Grammis	1994	Ace of Base	TV Audience Award	Won	
Grammis	1994	Ace of Base	Pop Group	Won	

- 1992 Music Television Award – Best Pop Act
- 1992 Music Television Award – Best New Act
- 1993 Popcorn Music Awards – Best Album: Happy Nation
- 1993 Popcorn Music Awards – Best Song & Video: All That She Wants
- 1993 Bronze BRAVO Otto (Germany) – Best Rock/Pop Group
- 1993 Swedish Dance Music Awards – Best Breakthrough Artist
- 1994 MTV Europe Music Awards – Best Cover (Nominee)
- 1994 Billboard Music Award – Number One Single
- 1994 Billboard Music Award – Top New Artist
- 1994 Billboard Music Award – Artist of the Year
- 1994 Peleg Music Award of Excellence – Best New Artist
- 1994 World Music Award – World's Best-Selling Scandinavian Recording Artists of the Year
- 1994 Echo (Germany) – Group of the Year
- 1994 Swedish Dance Music Awards – Best Swedish Dance Artist
- 1994 Swedish Dance Music Awards – Best Swedish Dance Album (nominee)
- 1994 OKEJ Magazine Award
- 1994 Visionary Award
- 1995 Grammy Awards – Best Pop Album for The Sign (nominee)
- 1995 Grammy Awards – Best New Artist (nominee)
- 1995 Grammy Awards – Best Vocal Performance By a Group or Duo for The Sign (nominee)
- 1995 World Music Award – World's Best-Selling Scandinavian Recording Artists of the Year
- 1995 Juno Awards – International Album of the Year for The Sign (nominee)
- 1995 Swedish Dance Music Awards – Best Swedish Dance Artist (nominee)
- 1996 European Award For Dance Music
- 1996 World Music Award – World's Best-Selling Scandinavian Recording Artists of the Year
- 1997 World Music Award – World's Best-Selling Scandinavian Recording Artists of the Year
- 1998 Midem Fono Award – Most Played Song of the Year – Life Is a Flower
- 1999 RSH Gold for Cruel Summer
- 2011 Scandipop Award – Best group album
- 2016 BMI Award for over 4 million performances of The Sign on US TV and radio
- 2021 BMI Award for over 5 million performances of The Sign on US TV and radio
- 2024 Swedish Music Hall of Fame – inducted
- 2025 BMI Award for over 6 million performances of The Sign on US TV and radio

== Discography ==
Studio albums

- Happy Nation / The Sign (1992/1993)
- The Bridge (1995)
- Flowers / Cruel Summer (1998)
- Da Capo (2002)
- The Golden Ratio (2010)

== See also ==
- Swedish pop music
