= Jenny Berggren =

Swedish singer (born 1972)

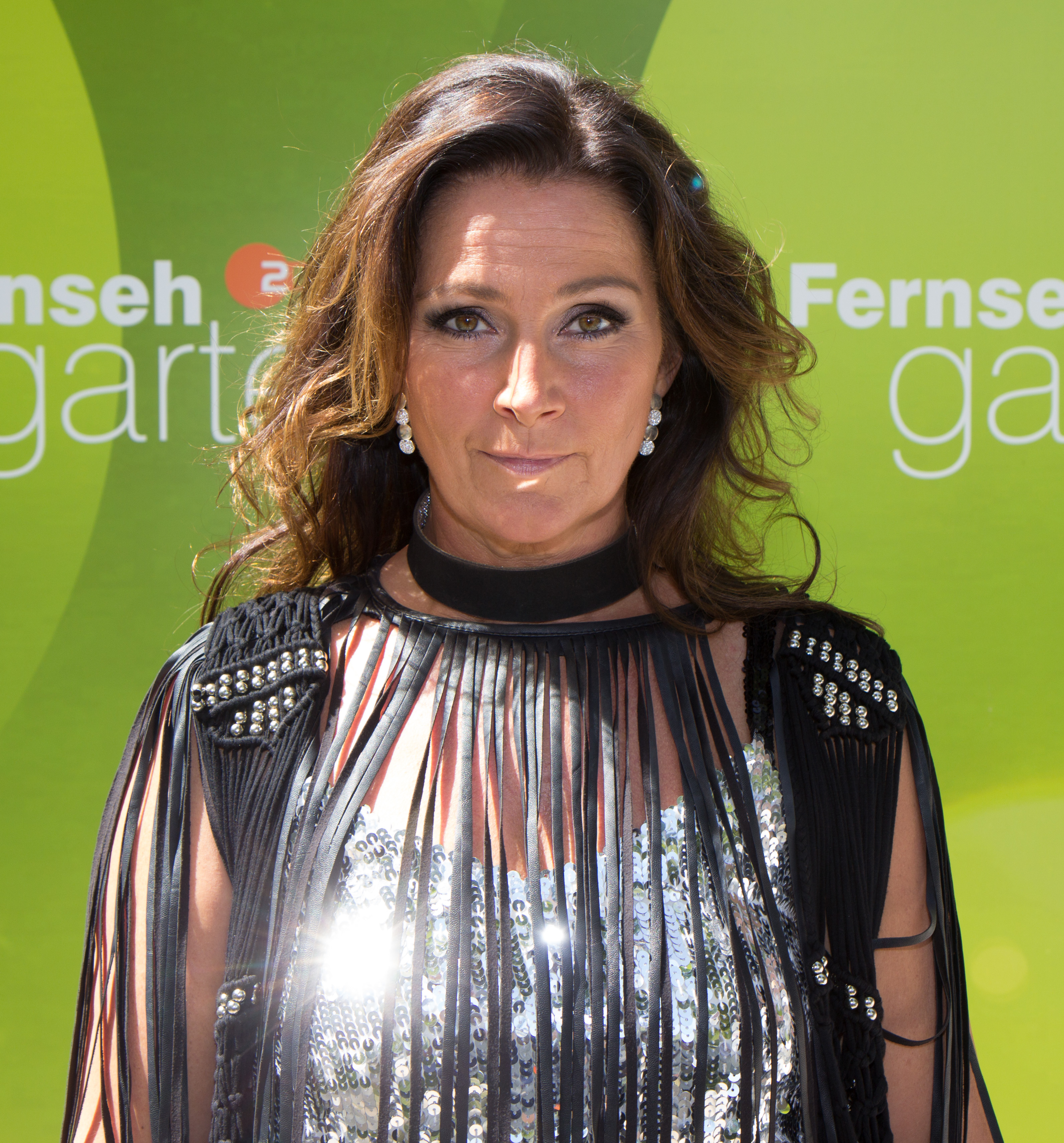
- Berggren in 2018

Background information
- Born: Jenny Cecilia Berggren; 19 May 1972 (age 54); Gothenburg, Sweden
- Occupation: Singer-songwriter
- Instrument: Vocals
- Years active: 1987–present
- Labels: Ipono; Universal Sweden
- Spouse: Jakob Petrén (m. 2004)

Jenny Cecilia Petrén (née Berggren; born 19 May 1972), professionally known as Jenny Berggren and Jenny from Ace of Base is a Swedish mezzo-soprano singer and former lead singer in the Swedish pop band Ace of Base. Since 1995, she has also been writing songs and performing solo. In 2010, she released her debut album My Story.

== Life and career ==
=== Early life ===
Berggren was born in Gothenburg, the youngest of three children born to Göran Berggren, an X-ray technician, and Birgitta Berggren. She was raised in a Christian family in the Gothenburg suburbs.

All three children took music lessons, and Berggren, along with her older sister Malin, practiced violin. Educated to become a teacher, Berggren studied classical music and sang for her church choir with her sister.

=== Ace of Base ===
During the late 1980s, the Berggren siblings, along with close friend, Ulf Ekberg, formed the techno band Tech Noir. The group eventually became Ace of Base. Berggren also attended university, with the intention of becoming a teacher. However, she still pursued a musical career, performing background vocals for symphonic rock band Masque while simultaneously preparing vocals to Ace of Base material, which had yet to be released. Berggren put her plans to become a teacher on hold when Ace of Base was signed to Danish label Mega Records, with the band's debut album eventually selling more than 30 million copies worldwide.

Berggren's original role in the band was equal with her sister, Linn Berggren, although the first singles chosen by the record company had Linn singing most of the lead vocals. In the early years, she and Linn only had a minor role in the production or writing of any of the band's songs. Berggren later composed several songs for the band's The Bridge album, including "Ravine", a song about an attack that occurred the night of 27 April 1994. On that evening, Berggren and her mother were attacked in their home by a woman who had followed Berggren home. Berggren's mother was stabbed in the hands, and the woman, a 21-year-old German named Manuela Behrendt, was banned from returning to Sweden. Jenny also composed "Wave Wet Sand" and "Experience Pearls". She then continued to compose songs for the band's albums, and her compositions have been included on each successive album. Later, with sister Linn's sudden withdrawal from the spotlight and beginning with the single "Life Is a Flower" in 1998, Berggren was forced into a more prominent vocal role.

=== Reunion with Ace of Base and breakup ===
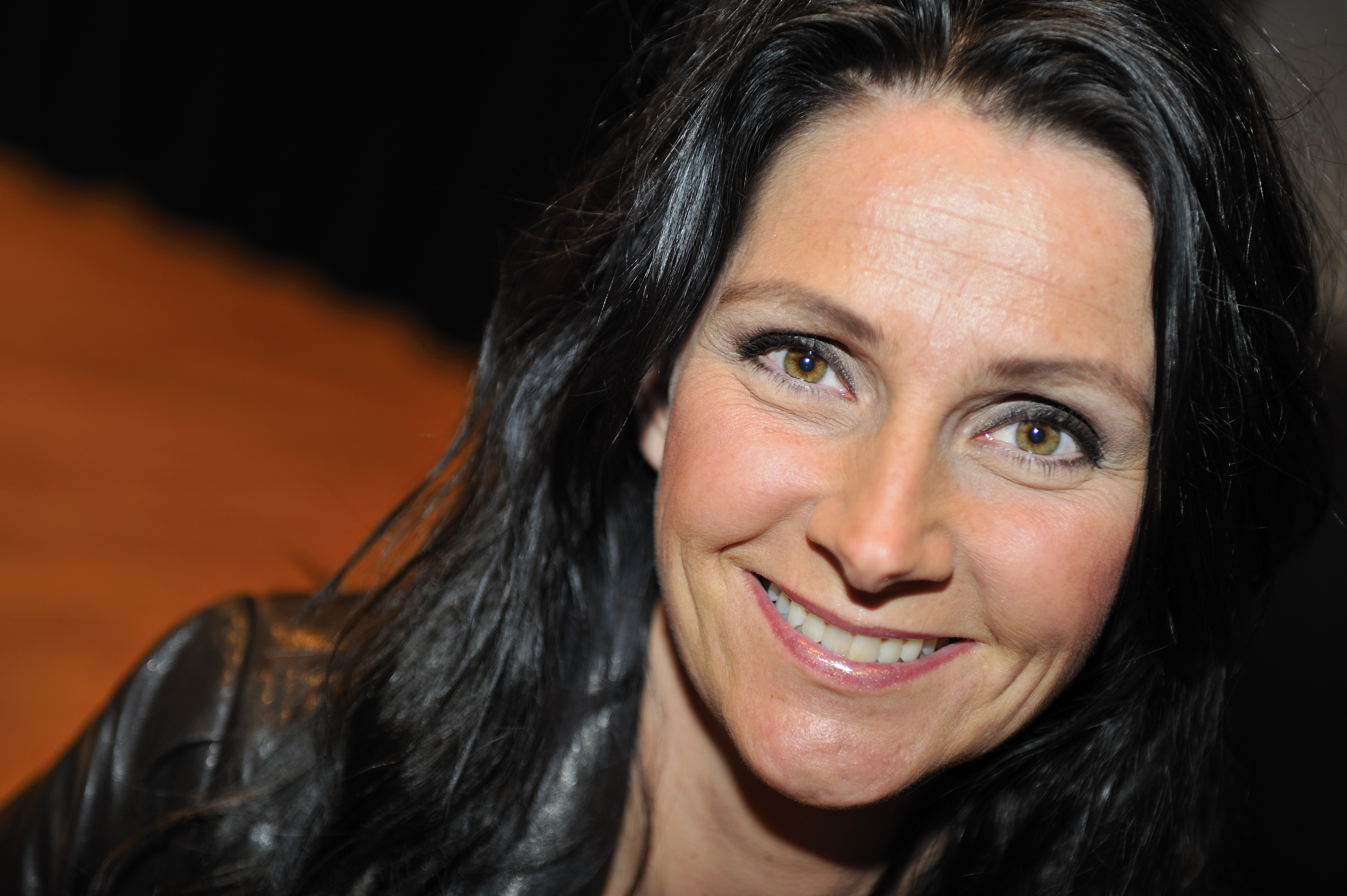
Berggren in 2008

The band remained out of the spotlight throughout 2003 and 2004, although Berggren kept busy by performing solo live performances in several Christian shows with her husband, and released an album as a vocalist with the Swedish group Arose.

Berggren, Jonas, and Ulf performed a series of concerts in 2007–2009 in Europe and Asia. While touring they recorded new songs designated for a fifth studio album. The trio did not get a record contract with the songs that were produced and Berggren continued working on her own solo material. In 2009 Berggren announced via Twitter that she was working on new songs for a solo album.

During this time, Ulf and Jonas recruited two other female vocalists, Clara Hagman and Julia Williamson. When this came to the fans' attention, Jonas and Berggren independently stated that this new group would not be called Ace of Base, but would use another name. This alternative line-up later presented a slightly changed name: "Ace.of.Base", but this was mainly a graphical adjustment used on the cover of their releases only. In an interview for Swedish TV Ulf stated: "We're still called Ace of Base. The dots are more for styling and the logo." Berggren has stated several times that she has never left the band and on the contrary declared that all four original members are still band members and own the brand Ace of Base, by agreement with her brother Jonas and by legal documents.

This was later confirmed by Jonas in an interview stating: "She (Jenny) never officially said "I quit". But to the record company, she was a leaving member. And they cancelled her contract. But she never said "oh, I don’t want to be in the band"... they wanted a new girl, a new lead vocalist." Regarding the name dispute, Ulf stated that he had "no problems using the name even though all the original members are not included." Berggren discussed this topic further in a newspaper interview on 18 October 2010. She said that she wasn't allowed by Jonas and Ulf to participate in the songwriting for the band's album. "From now on, I want paper on things. I agreed to work under certain conditions, and they just vanished... They didn't want me in". When asked, "Do you want to go back to Ace of Base again?" she responded, "Not right now. It would take some apologies."

In 2016, Berggren stated: "We won't re-form [...] We're finished working together, but we're not finished being family together. We have a lot of fun plans in the future but no musical plans."

=== Solo career and autobiography ===
In late 2009, Berggren published her autobiography Vinna hela världen. The first edition of the book sold out in Sweden (which only 4% of the books in Sweden do), and a second edition had to be pressed. An English version was to be called To Win the World and was planned to be available in 2011, but a release has yet to surface.

On New Year's Day 2010, Berggren released her solo song, "Free Me", as a free download to her fans via her new website. In May 2010, she released her first solo single, "Here I Am", which is available on iTunes. The single reached number 14 on the Swedish singles charts. On 15 September 2010 she released her second single, "Gotta Go". Her debut album, My Story, was released on 13 October 2010.

Berggren was revealed on 3 February to be a wildcard for the Danish national final for the Eurovision Song Contest 2011 with her entry "Let Your Heart Be Mine". At the national final on 26 February 2011, she performed "Let Your Heart Be Mine". After the first round of voting, she failed to place in the top four and did not advance further in the competition.

In 2015 Berggren participated in the TV4 show Så mycket bättre.

== Personal life ==
Berggren continues to volunteer her time to various humanitarian charities and has staged several Christian concerts as well as regularly singing in churches.

On 18 September 2004, Berggren married her long-time boyfriend Jakob Petrén, a Swedish pianist. They have two children together, a son and a daughter. Berggren and her family reside in Gothenburg.

== Discography ==
=== Albums ===
Year	Title	Peak position
Year	Title	SWE
2010	My Story: Released: 13 October 2010; Label: Ipono Productions, Universal; Formats: CD, digital download	48

=== Singles ===
Year	Title	Peak position	Album
Year	Title	SWE	Album
2010	"Here I Am"	14	My Story
2010	"Gotta Go"	–	My Story
2011	"Let Your Heart Be Mine"	–	Non-album singles
2015	"Come"	47	Non-album singles
2015	"Push Play"	–	Non-album singles
2022	"Open & Alive"	–	Non-album singles
2024	"Keep Quiet"	–	Non-album singles
2024	"Lion’s Den"	–	Non-album singles

== Vocals ==
Berggren has contributed vocals for all original Ace of Base songs except:

- "All That She Wants" (Malin Berggren, Jonas Berggren, and Ulf Ekberg)
- "Happy Nation" (Malin Berggren, Jonas Berggren, and Ulf Ekberg)
- "Dimension of Depth" (instrumental)
- "Dancer in a Daydream" (Malin Berggren only)
- "Strange Ways" (Euro version, Malin Berggren only)
- "Everytime It Rains" (Malin Berggren only)

== Writing ==
Berggren has contributed music and lyrics to the following Ace of Base songs:

- "Hear Me Calling" (with Jonas Berggren, Malin Berggren and Ulf Ekberg)
- "Ravine"
- "Wave Wet Sand"
- "Experience Pearls"
- "He Decides"
- "Love in December" (with Jonas Berggren, Malin Berggren and Ulf Ekberg)
- "Beautiful Morning" (with Malin Berggren and Jonas Berggren)
- "Change With the Light" (with Malin Berggren, Jonas Berggren and Ulf Ekberg)
- "What's the Name of the Game" (with Malin Berggren, Jonas Berggren, Ekberg, Harry Sommerdahl and Jonas von der Burg)
- "Pole Position" (with Jonas Berggren, Malin Berggren and Ulf Ekberg)
- "Moment of Magic" (with Jonas Berggren, Malin Berggren and Ulf Ekberg)
- "Memories Forever" (with Jonas Berggren, Malin Berggren and Ulf Ekberg)
- "Immanuel"
- "Stay With Me"
- "Wish You Were Mine" (with Jonas Berggren, Ulf Ekberg and Jakob Petrén)
- "Couldn't Care Less" (with Jonas Berggren, Ulf Ekberg and Jakob Petrén)

Solo songs:

- "Air of Love"
- "Beat of My Heart"
- "Dying to Stay Alive"
- "Free Me"
- "Give Me the Faith"
- "Going Home"
- "Gotta Go"
- "Here I Am"
- "Natural Superstar"
- "Numb"
- "Spend This Night"
