= Wheel of Fortune (Ace of Base song) =

1992 single by Ace of Base

- Artwork for original release

Single by Ace of Base

from the album Happy Nation
- B-side: "My Mind"
- Released: 29 June 1992
- Recorded: 1991
- Studio: Studio Decibel
- Genre: Reggae fusion; dance-pop
- Length: 3:54
- Label: Mega (1993); Playground Music (2009)
- Songwriters: Jonas Berggren; Ulf Ekberg
- Producers: Jonas Berggren; Ulf Ekberg; T.O.E.C.

Ace of Base singles chronology
"Wheel of Fortune" (1992)	"All That She Wants" (1992)
Unspeakable (2002)	Wheel of Fortune 2009 (2009)	All for You (2010)

Music video
- "Ace of Base - Wheel of Fortune (Official Music Video)" on YouTube

"Wheel of Fortune" is a song by Swedish pop group Ace of Base, released as their first single from the debut album, Happy Nation (1992). The song was first serviced to Danish radio in early 1992, through Mega Records, but failed to pick up much support. When re-promoted for a third time and released in stores on 29 June 1992, it entered the official Danish singles chart at number six, before later peaking at number two. It wasn't released elsewhere in Europe until 1993, following the success of their second single, "All That She Wants".

"Wheel of Fortune" is a reggae flavoured dance-pop song written by bandmembers Jonas Berggren and Ulf Ekberg. It was recorded in Studio Decibel in Stockholm, Sweden for a budget of SEK 30,000, and did not enter the charts when it was released for the first time. It was the third re-release of the single that entered the charts after radio stations and clubs started to play it. The song peaked at number-one in Norway, and was a top-10 hit in Austria, Belgium, Denmark, Germany, Greece, Israel, the Netherlands, Spain and Switzerland. Its music video was directed by Viking Nielson.

== Critical reception ==
AllMusic editor Jose F. Promis complimented the song as "stellar". In a retrospective review, Nikola Nedeljkovic Gøttsche from Danish Dagbladet Information remarked its "immediate melodic pop appeal and the combination of dancefloor pop and the fashionable warm reggae". Upon the release, Swedish Göteborgsposten described it as a "dance-song with some "Bad Boys" (Inner Circle) and Dr. Alban rhythms, but with more pop direction." The reviewer complimented Linn Berggren's voice, adding that it "makes me think of Angel for a while". Andrew Balkin from Kingston Informer noted that "the Aces go downbeat" on "Wheel of Fortune" and "Happy Nation", stating that both songs "have a soul/dance feel about them and wouldn't be out of place on the dance floor, or setting the mood in a smoky club." Liverpool Echo wrote that it is "cannily close" to "All That She Wants", with "its reggae-ish beat and just as catchy."

In his weekly UK chart commentary, James Masterton described it as "poppy dub-reggae", while Pan-European magazine Music & Media described it as "oriental-tinged". Alan Jones from Music Week gave the single four out of five, writing that the group "return with another subdued reggae singalong that also suggests Opus's "Live is Life" hit. Fewer of the commercially-pleasing devices that exemplified "All That She Wants" mean it will be a smaller hit though another Top 10 placing seems likely." Eric Torres from Pitchfork felt the band were "essentially nailing their formula on the first go: enthusiastic synth melodies, weaving percussive rhythms, and the Berggren sisters’ swooping voices. Yet it also contains a melancholic undercurrent that pulls at the corners of their best songs. That bittersweetness is their irresistible, maudlin draw, one that would become key to Ace of Base’s massive appeal." James Hamilton from the Record Mirror Dance Update deemed it "another Boney M-ish inane non sequiturs filled Swedish pop lurcher". Chuck Campbell from Scripps Howard News Service named it a "reggae-paced" number.

== Chart performance ==
The single entered the Danish charts at number six on the chart dated 10 July 1992. It would go on to peak at number two in October, with the follow-up single "All That She Wants" overtaking it at number one. In the United Kingdom, "Wheel of Fortune" was released as the second single and it reached number 20 in its second week at the UK Singles Chart, on 29 August 1993. On the Music Week Dance Singles chart, it reached number 13 same week. It was a number-one hit in Norway for four weeks, and a number-two hit in Denmark and the Netherlands. In the Netherlands, it was held off reaching the number-one position by "(I Can't Help) Falling In Love With You" by UB40. Additionally, the song entered the top 10 also in Austria (6), Belgium (5), Germany (4), Greece (3), Spain (6), and Switzerland (5), while it was a top-20 hit in Finland (15), Iceland (11) and Ireland (18). On the Eurochart Hot 100, "Wheel of Fortune" reached the top 5, peaking at number five. Outside Europe, it became a successful top-3 hit in Israel, peaking at number two on 7 April 1993. It earned a gold record in Germany, with a sale of 250,000 singles and spending a total of 26 weeks within the German Singles Chart.

Prior to the official release of the song, a live version of the song entered the charts at number two in Brazilian radio station Emboabas FM on 3 December 2007. The song entered the Radio Aachen chart in Germany at number 26 on 15 December 2007. It also entered the Euro WebCharts at number five in the last week of 2007 and eventually reached number one.

== Music video ==
=== 1992 version ===
The original version's music video for "Wheel of Fortune" was directed by Viking Nielson and features all four original members. In a 2018 interview, Ulf Ekberg told that they had $1000 to shoot the video.

It begins with Linn singing. A woman is sitting in a chair on the middle of what appears to be a wheel of fortune. Then several other characters appear along the video. Like a boxing blonde, a little girl playing with an hourglass, a bride in a wedding dress, an angel playing with a golden ball and an older couple. Sometimes the woman in the chair also appears with a man or with the older couple. All of the video's characters are standing on a rotating platform, and the video's margin tilts from side to side. In between, we see the four members of Ace of Base performing standing together in a circle with their backs against each other. Linn sometimes sings in the chair on the wheel. Other times she appears with Jenny. Joker and Buddha are seen playing on different instruments, such as keyboard, drum, and trumpet. Occasionally, a clock turns in the background. The video was later made available on Ace of Base's official YouTube channel in 2010, and had generated more than 37 million views as of August 2023.

=== 2009 version ===
The 2009 re-recording was the first and only single released by the band as a trio. For this version, the label decided not to shoot a video for the song. However, a promo video was published on 21 October 2008 on the band's official website. Similar to their 1998 single "Always Have Always Will", the video completely consists of live footage from their Redefined tour and video footage from a photoshoot. The edit used in the video is a combination of the radio and album versions, lasting at 3:15 minutes.

== Track listings ==
=== Original release ===
- 7-inch single
1. "Wheel of Fortune" – 3:42
2. "Wheel of Fortune" (Club Mix) – 4:39
- CD single, The Nordics
1. "Wheel of Fortune"
- CD maxi, UK
1. "Wheel of Fortune" (7" Mix) – 3:42
2. "Wheel of Fortune" (12" Mix) – 5:27
3. "Wheel of Fortune" (Club Mix) – 4:39
4. "My Mind" (Dance Mix) – 4:19

=== 2009 version ===
- Digital single
1. "Wheel of Fortune 2009" (Radio Edit)
2. "Wheel of Fortune 2009" (Club Mix)
- CD single - Promo
1. "Wheel of Fortune 2009" (Radio Edit)
2. "Wheel of Fortune 2009" (Club Mix)
3. "Wheel of Fortune 2009" (Album Version)
4. "Wheel of Fortune" (1993 12" Mix)
5. "Wheel of Fortune" (1993 Club Mix)

== Personnel ==
- Vocals by Linn Berggren
- Written by Jonas Berggren and Ulf Ekberg
- Produced by Jonas Berggren and Ulf Ekberg, T.O.E.C.
- Recorded at Studios Decibel

== Charts ==
=== Weekly charts ===
Weekly chart performance for "Wheel of Fortune"
Chart (1992–1993)	Peak position
Austria (Ö3 Austria Top 40)	6
Belgium (Ultratop 50 Flanders)	5
Denmark (IFPI)	2
Europe (Eurochart Hot 100)	10
Europe (European Dance Radio)	24
Finland (Suomen virallinen lista)	15
France (SNEP)	21
Germany (GfK)	4
Greece (Pop + Rock)	3
Iceland (Íslenski Listinn Topp 40)	11
Ireland (IRMA)	18
Israel (Israeli Singles Chart)	2
Netherlands (Dutch Top 40)	2
Netherlands (Single Top 100)	3
Norway (VG-lista)	1
Spain (AFYVE)	6
Sweden (Sverigetopplistan)	39
Switzerland (Schweizer Hitparade)	5
UK Singles (OCC)	20
UK Dance (Music Week)	13
UK Airplay Chart (Media Monitor)	35

=== Year-end charts ===
Year-end chart performance for "Wheel of Fortune"
Chart (1993)	Position
Austria (Ö3 Austria Top 40)	27
Belgium (Ultratop 50 Flanders)	28
Europe (Eurochart Hot 100)	44
Germany (Media Control)	13
Netherlands (Dutch Top 40)	28
Netherlands (Single Top 100)	23
Switzerland (Schweizer Hitparade)	31

== Certifications ==
Certifications for "Wheel of Fortune"
Region	Certification	Certified units/sales
Germany (BVMI)	Gold	250,000^{^}
^{^} Shipments figures based on certification alone.

== Release history ==
Release history and formats for "Wheel of Fortune"
Region	Date	Label
Denmark	29 June 1992	Mega
Sweden	1 February 1993	Mega
United Kingdom	16 August 1993	London
