= C'est la Vie (Always 21) =

1999 single by Ace of Base

Single by Ace of Base

from the album Singles of the 90's
- Released: 25 October 1999
- Genre: Europop; Synth-pop
- Length: 3:24
- Label: Mega
- Songwriter: Jonas Berggren
- Producers: Jimmy James; S. Pettersen; Sig Rossby

Ace of Base singles chronology
"Cecilia" (1999)	"C'est la Vie (Always 21)" (1999)	"Hallo Hallo" (2000)

Music video
- "C'est la Vie (Always 21)" on YouTube

"C'est la Vie (Always 21)" is the first new single released from Ace of Base's first greatest hits album, Singles of the 90s. It was produced by Jimmy James Ekgren, Sonny Peterson and Sigurd Rosnes of JPR Productions. It was released in Europe on 25 October 1999. A planned UK release with additional remixes for 6 December was cancelled, but the remixes were finally released commercially in 2020 as part of the boxset All That She Wants: The Classic Collection. A music video was produced to promote the single. The video was directed by Patric Ullaeus and charted #1 in Spain.

== Critical reception ==
AllMusic editor Bryan Buss described the song as "young-at-heart" in his review of the band's Greatest Hits album. Swedish newspaper Expressen wrote that it "sounds as if Ace Of Base has gone into childhood again". They added that "the group's charm comes out best" on a song like "C'est la Vie (Always 21)".

== Track listing ==
Scandinavia/Germany maxi single

1. Radio Version - 3:26
2. Megamix (Short Version) - 3:24
3. Cecilia (Ole Evenrude Version) - 4:35
4. Megamix (Long Version) - 7:19
5. Discomatic Remix - 3:56

UK maxi single (unreleased)

1. Radio Edit - 3:29
2. Megamix (Long Version) - 7:19
3. All That She Wants (12" Version) - 6:46

== Official versions/remixes ==
- Album Version
- Discomatic Remix (also simply titled "Remix" on some releases)
- Shaft Radio Edit
- Shaft Club Mix
- Skeewiff's Full Bitter
- Sleaze Sisters Anthem
- Tuff Twins Mix

== Release history ==
Region	Date	Label
Germany	25 October 1999	Polydor
Sweden	8 November 1999	Mega
Spain	10 January 2000	Polydor

== Charts ==
=== Weekly charts ===
Weekly chart performance for "C'est la Vie (Always 21)"
Chart (1999–2000)	Peak position
Finland (Suomen virallinen lista)	11
Germany (GfK)	64
Spain (PROMUSICAE)	1
Sweden (Sverigetopplistan)	38
Switzerland (Schweizer Hitparade)	100

=== Year-end charts ===
Year-end chart performance for "C'est la Vie (Always 21)"
Chart (2000)	Rank
Europe Border Breakers (Music & Media)	78
