= Never Gonna Say I'm Sorry =

1996 single by Ace of Base

- Single cover

Single by Ace of Base

from the album The Bridge
- Released: 11 March 1996
- Recorded: Cheiron Studios
- Genre: Pop-reggae
- Length: 3:16
- Label: Mega; Arista
- Songwriter: Jonas Berggren
- Producers: Denniz PoP; Max Martin; Jonas Berggren

Ace of Base singles chronology
"Beautiful Life" (1995)	"Never Gonna Say I'm Sorry" (1996)	"Life Is a Flower" (1998)

Music video
- "Never Gonna Say I'm Sorry" on YouTube

"Never Gonna Say I'm Sorry" is a song by Swedish band Ace of Base, released as a single on 11 March 1996, by Mega and Arista Records. It was the third single taken from the band's second album, The Bridge (1995). It is written by Jonas Berggren and produced by him with Swedish producers Denniz PoP and Max Martin. "Never Gonna Say I'm Sorry" saw limited success compared to previous singles from the album, only reaching the top 40 in a few European countries and failing to enter the Billboard Hot 100 in the United States. It did not receive a commercial single release in the United Kingdom. The accompanying music video was directed by Richard Heslop.

== Background ==
The song was written by band member Jonas Berggren, who was hoping to reproduce the flavour of their 1993 hit "All That She Wants". He specifically mentions the similarities between the two songs in the liner notes of the booklet for The Bridge album. He said, "We decided early on to do an "All That She Wants" arrangement and drums because it's always fun to have something old on a new record."

== Critical reception ==
J.D. Considine from The Baltimore Sun felt the song "tops its 'All That She Wants'-style arrangement with a vocal so tinged with regret that it's hard not to wince at the irony in lines like I will make you happy, make you laugh." Steve Baltin from Cash Box wrote that songs like "Never Gonna Say I'm Sorry" "work because the band downplays the dance sound, displaying some nice understated pop hooks." Larry Flick from Billboard magazine described it as a "wise single selection" from the act's current album, The Bridge. He added that it "takes this Swedish foursome right back where they began—chirping atop a glossy reggae/pop melody that instantly triggers memories of the breakthrough hit 'All That She Wants'. It worked once, and chances are good that it will work again. Even the act's harshest critics will have to admit that the hook is instantly memorable."

Dave Sholin from the Gavin Report concluded with that "by providing the planet with all that it wants in the realm of pop music, this Swedish foursome has yet to disappoint its ever-growing legion of fans. Thanks to the creative power of Jonas Berggren, the Ace of Base sound remains distinctive without getting stale. Early spins paint a positive future for single number three from The Bridge." Robbie Daw from Idolator described it as a "bouncy" tune. Brian A. Gnatt from The Michigan Daily stated that the song "carries through with the good ol' familiar style". Pan-European magazine Music & Media named it a "mid-tempo dance tune with a dominant, deep beat and the bouncy melodies which have become Ace of Base's musical trademark. Short and snappy, this single can be played at any time of the day." Bob Waliszewski of publication Plugged In found in his review, that on the song, "the singer refuses to compromise who she is". Chuck Campbell from Scripps Howard News Service wrote that "Never Gonna Say I'm Sorry" "is an unapologetic and propulsive reworking of the band's 'All That She Wants'. It stands to be another smash."

== Chart performance ==
"Never Gonna Say I'm Sorry" didn't reach the same level of success as "Lucky Love" and "Beautiful Life", but was a notable hit. In Europe, it was a number-one hit in Estonia and became a top-10 hit in Hungary, where it peaked at number six. Additionally, the single was a top-20 hit in Denmark and Finland, a top-30 hit in the band's native Sweden and a top-40 hit in Iceland. It peaked at number 78 on the Eurochart Hot 100. Outside Europe, "Never Gonna Say I'm Sorry" became a top-20 hit in West Asia, peaking at number 11 in Israel on 14 May 1996. In North America, it reached number seven on the RPM Dance chart and number 53 on the Canadian Hot 100 in Canada, number six on the Billboard Bubbling Under Hot 100 Singles chart and number 18 on the Billboard Maxi-Singles Sales chart in the United States. In Oceania, the song peaked at number 79 on the ARIA singles chart in Australia.

== Music video ==
The music video for "Never Gonna Say I'm Sorry" was directed by British director Richard Heslop and released in 1996. The video includes computer-generated imagery and mirror effects designed to make the video feel like a funhouse, much like the video for ABBA's "SOS". In the USA the video was never released as Arista Records was dissatisfied with the video and opted not to release one to accompany the single release.

In Europe, the single was accompanied by a short promotion tour by the band and two alternate videos. In the US, the only promotion consisted of tiny misspelled stickers on the CD packaging, although the record company did send out promotional copies of the Sweetbox Radio Mix to radio stations. With the band members away in Europe and with no other form of promotion, the single failed to enter the official US charts, peaking at #106. It was the first Ace of Base single to fail to chart inside of the Top 40 in the US.

Though the US version of the "Lucky Love" video was filmed later, "Never Gonna Say I'm Sorry" was chronologically the last video that was released with major participation from Malin.

== Track listings ==
- Australian CD single
1. "Never Gonna Say I'm Sorry" (Short Version) – 3:16
2. "Never Gonna Say I'm Sorry" (Long Version) – 6:34
3. "Never Gonna Say I'm Sorry" (Rock Version) – 4:02
4. "Never Gonna Say I'm Sorry" (Sweetbox Funky Mix) – 6:46
- United States Maxi single
1. "Never Gonna Say I'm Sorry" – 3:16
2. "Never Gonna Say I'm Sorry" (Sweetbox Extended Mix) – 6:46
3. "Never Gonna Say I'm Sorry" (Lenny B's Club Mix) – 8:24
4. "Never Gonna Say I'm Sorry" (Lenny B's Organ-ic House Mix) – 7:14

== Personnel ==
- Vocals by Linn Berggren and Jenny Berggren
- StabGuitar by Chuck Anthony
- Music by Jonas Berggren
- Lyrics by Jonas Berggren
- Produced by Denniz Pop, Max Martin and Jonas Berggren
- Recorded and produced at Cheiron Studios

== Charts ==
Chart (1996)	Peak position
Australia (ARIA)	79
Austria (Ö3 Austria Top 40)	38
Canada Top Singles (RPM)	53
Canada Dance/Urban (RPM)	7
Denmark (Tracklisten)	12
Estonia (Eesti Top 20)	1
Europe (Eurochart Hot 100)	78
Europe (European Hit Radio)	22
Finland (Suomen virallinen lista)	17
France (SNEP)	41
Germany (GfK)	44
Hungary (Mahasz)	6
Iceland (Íslenski Listinn Topp 40)	40
Israel (Israeli Singles Chart)	11
Netherlands (Dutch Top 40 Tipparade)	16
Netherlands (Dutch Single Tip)	12
Sweden (Sverigetopplistan)	24
US Bubbling Under Hot 100 Singles (Billboard)	6
US Maxi-Singles Sales (Billboard)	18

== Release history ==
Region	Date	Format(s)	Label(s)	Ref(s).
Europe	11 March 1996	—N/a	Mega	
United States	9 July 1996	Rhythmic contemporary; contemporary hit radio	Arista	
United States	22 July 1996	12-inch vinyl; CD; cassette	Arista	
Japan	24 July 1996	CD	Arista; BMG	
