= Beautiful Life (Ace of Base song) =

1995 single by Ace of Base

- Artwork for US release; international release uses different typeface for the song title and includes the band's name

Single by Ace of Base

from the album The Bridge
- Released: 20 October 1995
- Genre: Eurodance; disco; gospel; techno
- Length: 3:38
- Label: Mega
- Songwriters: Jonas Berggren; John Ballard
- Producers: Jonas Berggren; Denniz Pop; Max Martin

Ace of Base singles chronology
| "Lucky Love" (1995) | "Beautiful Life" (1995) | "Never Gonna Say I'm Sorry" (1996) |

Music video
- "Beautiful Life" on YouTube

Audio sample
- file; help

"Beautiful Life" is a song by Swedish band Ace of Base, released on 20 October 1995, by Mega Records, from their second album, The Bridge (1995). In North America, it was the first single released from the album; in Europe, it followed "Lucky Love" as the second single. Co-written by band member Jonas Berggren and produced by him with Denniz Pop and Max Martin, the single reached number 15 on both the US Billboard Hot 100 and the UK Singles Chart in December 1995. It also reached number one on the Canadian RPM Dance/Urban chart and Billboard's Hot Dance Club Play chart. The accompanying music video was directed by Richard Heslop. In 2017, BuzzFeed ranked "Beautiful Life" number 51 in their list of "The 101 Greatest Dance Songs of the '90s".

== Background and release ==
"I was at the Canary Islands in Spain, and the last evening I just heard the song 'Beautiful Life' in my head. I have the ability to hear three different melodies in my head at the same time — it's very helpful while composing songs. Melody, bass and a flute on a chorus for example. It was melancholic to leave the islands and it was a wonderful evening, with the mood and sunset. It was a beautiful life!"

— Jonas Berggren talking to Idolator about how the song was made.

The song was written on January 1, 1994, by band member Jonas Berggren while he was in the Canary Islands. At the time, "The Sign" had reached number one on the US Billboard Hot 100 chart, which inspired him to write the song. On a late flight home he heard some chords, and started humming, and there the song was made. He had to record it swiftly so he wouldn't forget it. Berggren incorporated gospel elements into the song and the roof-raising gospel singing toward the end was made by a four-piece female group that Denniz Pop had. They tracked those vocals many times over for maximum soulful impact.

In an 2018 interview, Ulf Ekberg said that Michael Jackson, after asking to meet the band when they performed "Beautiful Life" at World Music Awards in Monaco, told them that he thought that it was the best song that he had heard in many years.

== Critical reception ==
J.D. Considine from The Baltimore Sun described "Beautiful Life" as "techno-tinged", adding that it "tempers its impetuous pulse and seemingly happy message with a memorably sad melody." Larry Flick from Billboard magazine deemed it a "jaunty, incredibly catchy li'l ditty that indulges in Euro-NRG dance rhythms while continuing to mine the ABBA-esque pop melodies". He stated that "even the act's detractors will find it impossible to resist the sugar-coated confection, with shoulder-shaking percussion and sing-along chorus." Steve Baltin from Cash Box called it "ridiculous", noting that "for this track, the quartet has jumped into this decade with a rocking dance beat that embodies the group's European heritage." The Daily Vault's Michael R. Smith declared it as a "high-octane techno gem". Dave Sholin from the Gavin Report commented, "Those asking the musical question—can Ace Of Base repeat? The answer is Yes! Yes! Yes!" Pan-European magazine Music & Media said the song has a "hyper-kinetic rhythm topped off by a killer hook that's part of your system before you realise it." A reviewer from Music Week rated it three out of five, noting the band's "switch from light reggae to pure Europop" and describing it as "uplifting but unremarkable."

Neil Strauss from The New York Times felt it is "pure treacly pleasure, with bubbling keyboards and a fast, chirpy rhythm that will inspire most listeners to forget that the 70's ever ended and accept the chorus – "It's a beautiful life"—for one night of disco-era hedonism." Bob Waliszewski of Plugged In (publication) viewed it as "a joyful admonition to hang tough when times get hard." J.D. Considine for Spin magazine noted in a writeup about The Bridge that "the real genius of Ace of Base lies not with perky singing... but with the ability to make melancholy sound so damned appealing." The evaluation continues to narrow in scope as he continues to say "even the cheerfully titled 'Beautiful life' dampens its club-savvy stomp with a heartbreaking minor key chorus." A reviewer from People Magazine opined that it "offers a blast of jumpy techno". Chuck Campbell from Scripps Howard News Service said it is "contagious" and "a high-energy dance song that rings with unbridled optimism (and eschews the reggae cadence of the group's previous American hits)." He added that "the Berggren sisters sing in ABBA-esque exclamation points on the song."

== Chart performance ==
"Beautiful Life" was very successful worldwide, reaching number-one both on the RPM Dance/Urban chart in Canada and the Billboard Hot Dance Club Play chart in the United States. In Europe, it made it to the top 10 in Denmark, Finland, France, Hungary and Lithuania, as well as on the Eurochart Hot 100 and MTV's European Top 20, where it hit number nine and eight. Additionally, the single was a top 20 hit in Belgium, Germany, Ireland, Latvia, Scotland and the United Kingdom. In the latter, it peaked at number 15 in its second week at the UK Singles Chart, on January 28, 1996. Outside Europe, "Beautiful Life" also reached number three on the RPM Top Singles chart in Canada, number five in Israel, number 11 in Australia, number 15 on the Billboard Hot 100 and number ten on the Cash Box Top 100 in the US. In Latin America, it also became a number-one hit in Mexico and a top-five hit in El Salvador. The song earned a gold record in Australia, with a sale of 35,000 singles.

== Music video ==
The music video for "Beautiful Life" was directed by British director Richard Heslop, who would go on to direct the band's later video for "Never Gonna Say I'm Sorry". The video was shot on YFO Studios in Gothenburg, Sweden in October 1995. The music video included computer-generated bubbles which whisked the band from place to place. According to music channel VH1 in the United States, the band's record label, Arista Records, insisted the bubbles be removed from the video, leading to a somewhat strange-looking US video, with the band members looking at (and reacting to) bubbles that were no longer there. In Europe, both versions of the video were released. In addition to the two alternate videos, remix videos were also created, and VH1 released a Pop-Up Video version of the video in 1998. "Beautiful Life" was made available on Ace of Base's official YouTube channel in January 2015, and had generated more than 171 million views as of late 2025.

== Track listings ==
- United Kingdom CD 1 and Australian CD
1. "Beautiful Life" (single version)
2. "Beautiful Life" (12" extended version)
3. "Beautiful Life" (Junior's Circuit Bump mix)
- United Kingdom CD 2
1. "Beautiful Life" (single version)
2. "Beautiful Life" (Vission Lorimer club mix)
3. "Beautiful Life" (Lenny B.'s House of Joy club mix)
4. "Beautiful Life" (Uno Clio mix)
- US maxi single
1. "Beautiful Life" (single version)
2. "Beautiful Life" (12" extended version)
3. "Beautiful Life" (Junior's Circuit Bump mix)
4. "Beautiful Life" (Vission Lorimer club mix)
5. "Beautiful Life" (Lenny B's House Of Joy club mix)
6. "Beautiful Life" (Uno Clio mix)

== Personnel ==
- Vocals by Linn Berggren, Jenny Berggren
- Backing Vocals and cue choir by Jeanette Söderholm
- Music by Jonas Berggren
- Lyrics by Jonas Berggren and John Ballard
- Produced by Denniz Pop, Max Martin and Jonas Berggren
- Recorded and produced at Cheiron Studios

== Charts ==
=== Weekly charts ===
| Chart (1995–1996) | Peak position |
|---|---|
| Australia (ARIA) | 11 |
| Austria (Ö3 Austria Top 40) | 24 |
| Belgium (Ultratop 50 Flanders) | 15 |
| Belgium (Ultratop 50 Wallonia) | 13 |
| Canada Top Singles (RPM) | 3 |
| Canada Adult Contemporary (RPM) | 6 |
| Canada Dance/Urban (RPM) | 1 |
| Denmark (IFPI) | 8 |
| El Salvador (UPI) | 4 |
| Europe (Eurochart Hot 100) | 9 |
| Europe (European Hit Radio) | 5 |
| Finland (Suomen virallinen lista) | 3 |
| France (SNEP) | 10 |
| Germany (GfK) | 20 |
| Hungary (Mahasz) | 6 |
| Iceland (Íslenski Listinn Topp 40) | 26 |
| Ireland (IRMA) | 12 |
| Israel (Israeli Singles Chart) | 5 |
| Latvia (Latvijas Top 50) | 12 |
| Lithuania (M-1) | 2 |
| Mexico (Notitas Musicales) | 1 |
| Netherlands (Dutch Top 40) | 34 |
| Netherlands (Single Top 100) | 27 |
| New Zealand (Recorded Music NZ) | 44 |
| Quebec (ADISQ) | 8 |
| Scottish Singles Sales (Official Charts) | 12 |
| Sweden (Sverigetopplistan) | 22 |
| Switzerland (Schweizer Hitparade) | 33 |
| UK Singles (Official Charts) | 15 |
| UK Airplay (Music Week) | 17 |
| UK Club Chart (Music Week) | 34 |
| US Billboard Hot 100 | 15 |
| US Dance Club Play (Billboard) | 1 |
| US Maxi-Singles Sales (Billboard) | 2 |
| US Top 40/Mainstream (Billboard) | 10 |
| US Top 40/Rhythm-Crossover (Billboard) | 18 |
| US Cash Box Top 100 | 10 |

| Chart (2026) | Peak position |
|---|---|
| Poland (Polish Airplay Top 100) | 83 |

=== Year-end charts ===
| Chart (1996) | Position |
|---|---|
| Australia (ARIA) | 65 |
| Belgium (Ultratop 50 Flanders) | 85 |
| Belgium (Ultratop 50 Wallonia) | 78 |
| Canada Top Singles (RPM) | 59 |
| Canada Adult Contemporary (RPM) | 63 |
| Canada Dance/Urban (RPM) | 12 |
| Europe (Eurochart Hot 100) | 67 |
| Latvia (Latvijas Top 50) | 80 |
| US Billboard Hot 100 | 94 |
| US Dance Club Play (Billboard) | 41 |
| US Maxi-Singles Sales (Billboard) | 26 |
| US Top 40/Mainstream (Billboard) | 66 |
| US Top 40/Rhythm-Crossover (Billboard) | 79 |

== Certifications ==
| Region | Certification | Certified units/sales |
|---|---|---|
| Australia (ARIA) | Gold | 35,000^{^} |
^{^} Shipments figures based on certification alone.

== Release history ==
| Region | Date | Label |
|---|---|---|
| United States | 16–17 October 1995 | Arista |
| Europe | 20 November 1995 | Mega, PolyGram |
| Japan | 8 December 1995 | Arista |
| United Kingdom | 15 January 1996 | London |

== Cover versions ==
It was covered in Yugoslavia by Dee Monk under the name "Samo želim da znam".

Indie band Jukebox The Ghost recorded a cover of the song for Engine Room Recordings' compilation album Guilt by Association Vol. 2, which was released in November 2008.

In 2015, the American dance-pop trio Punch !nc recorded a reimagined version of the song, titled "Heaven (Beautiful Life)." This version has reached number six on Billboard's Dance Club Songs chart.

Russian metal cover project Even Blurry Videos released their version of the song on YouTube in November 2019.

== Appearances in other media ==
- This song was included on the Night at the Roxbury (1998) soundtrack and was featured in the advertising campaign for the movie.
- The song was featured by the Filipino dance group "The Streetboys" (members like Vhong Navarro, Jhong Hilario and others) performed in the variety show in the Philippines, Eat Bulaga! in 1996.
- The song was used in TV advertisements for Lincraft, a fabric craft store franchise in Australia.
- The song was the first to be played the night that the Florida Marlins won Game 7 of the 1997 World Series.
- The song was also heard in the Adam Sandler films, I Now Pronounce You Chuck and Larry from 2007 and You Don't Mess With The Zohan from 2008.
- The Colombian latin pop singer Sara Tunes produced a new version of the song with a more electronic sound which has a rhythm similar to house music or dubstep, originally included on her second studio album, titled "XOXO".
- In the episode "The Eye of the Kong" of the web series Game Grumps, a MIDI version of the song is played as part of a montage.
- The song appeared on the episode from the TV show Hindsight, "Auld Lang Syne".
- The song featured on the soundtrack for Russian TV series Olga on TNT.
- The song is featured in the episode from the Netflix original series Everything Sucks!, "I Just Wanna Be Anybody".
- Wrestlers LJ Cleary, Nathan Martin and Darren Kearney, better known as More Then Hype, use this as an entrance theme when they come to the ring.
- The song was featured in the first episode of Impeachment: American Crime Story, in a scene where Monica Lewinsky (Beanie Feldstein) is exercising at a gym in early 1998.
