= The Bridge (Ace of Base album) =

Studio album by Ace of Base
- Released: 30 October 1995
- Genres: Dance; Euro-house; acoustic pop
- Length: 59:30
- Labels: Mega; Arista
- Producers: Per Adebratt; Bag; John Ballard; Jonas "Joker" Berggren; Linn Berggren; Douglas Carr; Ulf "Buddha" Ekberg; Tommy Ekman; Max Martin; Denniz Pop; Radiant; Björn O. "StoneStream" Stenström; Zal

Ace of Base chronology
The Sign (1993)	The Bridge (1995)	Flowers (1998)

Singles from The Bridge
- 1. "Lucky Love" Released: 2 October 1995; 2. "Beautiful Life" Released: 24 October 1995; 3. "Never Gonna Say I'm Sorry" Released: 11 March 1996

The Bridge is the second studio album by Swedish pop group Ace of Base. It was released in Europe on 30 October 1995 through Mega Records. It is the only Ace of Base album to feature sizable writing, production, vocal, and harmony contributions by all four band members.

The album was preceded by the singles "Beautiful Life" and "Lucky Love", which had varied levels of success. Both songs reached the top of the US Billboard Hot Dance Club Play chart and "Beautiful Life" peaked at number 15 on the US Billboard Hot 100, "Lucky Love" reaching number 30. Following the release of the album, "Never Gonna Say I'm Sorry" was released as the third and final single from the album but failed to become a hit due to a lack of promotion.

The first-ever double vinyl release of the group's sophomore album The Bridge was announced on 30 October 2025, to commentate the album's 30th anniversary. The release includes its original European track listing, a poster, postcards, and a unique interview with the band. The first 1,000 copies were issued on red vinyl. It was released on 30 January 2026.

== Background and composition ==
"I wanted some old friends who are producers on a very low level... I wanted to give them a chance to be on this record. But things didn’t turn out at all the way I wanted to and there was no time to redo it. It taught me a lot about how you’re supposed to act when you are in the position of commanding the ones you’re working with; that you have to command as well."

— Linn Berggren talks about working on the album.

On 1 January 1994, The Sign album and single hit number 1 on the Billboard Hot 100. Inspired by the band's success, Jonas penned the first song of what would become The Bridge while returning from vacation in the Canary Islands. The song was "Beautiful Life". Jonas hoped to incorporate gospel elements into the song, which was composed retaining the band's original club-friendly beat.

Because the band was still promoting their previous album, work on The Bridge was infrequent during much of 1994. In April 1994, an obsessed German fan broke into the Berggren family home and threatened both Jenny and her parents at knifepoint. Jenny would later use this experience as a source of inspiration in writing and composing the track "Ravine" for The Bridge.

For the album, Jonas and Ulf each separately composed a half-dozen songs. Instead of working together, as they had done on their previous album, Jonas and Ulf produced separately with different producers. Jonas' songs were recorded mainly at Cheiron Studios in Stockholm, while Ulf's tracks were created at Tuff Studios in Gothenburg. Ulf continued to work with John Ballard and StoneStream (Björn Stenstrom). In Stockholm, Jonas worked with producer Max Martin and vocalist Jeanette Söderholm. He also worked with Denniz Pop who had previously collaborated with the band on the hits "All That She Wants" and The Sign".

"I think production-wise it's far better than the first one. The sound is very crisp and poppy still, you can tell that they have grown up. It's more mature and complete. On the first album we had a lot of techno dance and the reggae pop tunes which were the big hits. On this album there are many directions because all four members of the band are writing. It's a nice combination of those four individual songwriters and I would say all four of them have come up with hits. (...) They are still pretty much the same four people from a little town in Sweden. They still like to be in their own city and hang around with their old friends and do whatever they did before, which I think is very nice."

— International product manager Mikkel Bagger talking to Music & Media about the album.

For the first time, Jenny and Linn also composed and produced songs. Their tracks were recorded mainly at Tuff Studios. Jenny mainly wrote and composed her pieces and relinquished production duties. Linn, on the other hand, took an active role in both writing and production and received production credits on the album. Linn worked with producers Zal and Radiant as well as previous collaborators Tommy Ekman and Per Adebratt. Although Linn would continue to receive writing credits on the band's later release, Da Capo, The Bridge is the only Ace of Base album which features production from her. "Lapponia", a track produced by Linn which was submitted and rejected for inclusion on The Bridge, would later be re-submitted for the band's following album, where it was yet again rejected.

By the turn of the year, the band had recorded enough demos to present to their three major record companies. Ulf and Jenny appeared on VH1's Lift Ticket to Ride and mentioned the band's new recordings.

Despite having writing and production credits on three tracks on The Bridge, Linn expressed dissatisfaction with the album. Douglas Carr of StoneStream believed the album should have been more successful, stating "The album had some really potential hits on it [and] the singles should have been bigger than it was". Claes Cornelius of Mega Records thought the album was "a better record" and "more varied" than their first album but also noted that The Bridge had less commercial appeal.

== Singles ==
"Lucky Love" was released as the first single from the album in Europe on 2 October 1995. The song was a success, reaching the top twenty in thirteen countries and the number one spot in Sweden and Finland. The accompanying music video was directed by Rocky Schenck.

"Beautiful Life" was released as the album's first single in North America on 24 October 1995. It was released as the second single from the album in Europe on 20 November. The colorful music video for the song was directed by Richard Heslop. The video included computer-generated bubbles which whisked the band from place to place. Arista Records insisted that the bubbles be removed for the North American release. Both versions of the video were released in Europe. To support the release, the band appeared in Canada and Mexico and performed in several Latin America countries. "Beautiful Life" was a success in the United States, peaking at number 15 on the Billboard Hot 100 and becoming their second single in a row to reach the number one spot on the US Billboard Hot Dance Club Play chart. The song went on to peak at number 3 in Canada and at number 15 in the United Kingdom.

An acoustic version of "Lucky Love" was released as the album's second single in North America on 6 February 1996, which was also the only version to appear on editions of the album released in the Americas. This version was accompanied by a new music video shot in January in the Hampton Court House. This release was not as successful as their previous efforts and only reached number 30 on the Billboard Hot 100, becoming their first release to miss the top twenty. It did, however, manage to become the band's third and final number one hit in a row on the US Billboard Hot Dance Club Play chart. In Canada, the song peaked at number 6.

"Never Gonna Say I'm Sorry" was released worldwide as the third and final single from the album. It was released in Europe on 11 March 1996 and in the United States on 30 July. The music video for the song was directed by Richard Heslop, who had previously directed the band's video for "Beautiful Life". Similar in composition to "Beautiful Life", the video includes computer-generated imagery and mirror effects designed to make the video feel like a funhouse. Arista Records was dissatisfied with the piece and decided not to release a video to accompany the single release in North America. The song received little promotion and failed to chart on the Billboard Hot 100.

Though no further singles from the album were released, promotional releases of "My Déjà Vu" appeared in France and Scandinavia in late 1996. In 1998, Polydor released a limited-release single-track promotional disc of "Angel Eyes". This was the very last Bridge release, and was packaged with the Southeast Asia version of Flowers.

== Promotion ==
Ace of Base appeared at several concerts around the world during 1996, including their second-largest performance ever at Viña del Mar, Chile, where the band performed in front of 20,000 fans. They also appeared in South-East Asia, where by some fan accounts, they performed poorly. At one point, lead singer Linn flew home. The band appeared the following year in April at the World Music Awards, where they accepted the award for Best Selling Scandinavian Artists of 1996. There, Jenny performed a solo, lip-synced rendition of "Ravine".

== Critical reception ==
Professional ratings
Review scores
Source	Rating
AllMusic	3/5 stars
The Baltimore Sun	(positive)
Cash Box	(positive)
The Encyclopedia of Popular Music	3/5 stars
Entertainment Weekly	B
Los Angeles Times	2/4 stars
Music & Media	(positive)
Q	3/5 stars
The Rolling Stone Album Guide	2.5/5 stars
Spin	(7/10)

Upon its release, The Bridge received generally mixed reviews from music critics. Many critics noted the departure in sound from their first album, with Q calling it "altogether bigger, deeper, darker, more accomplished effort than its rather half-baked predecessor" and Spin noting that the songs on The Bridge were "far more sophisticated than their pop pedigree would suggest." Music & Media stated that "there's no denying Ace of Base knows how to write unassuming, catchy pop for the masses. Jim Farber of Entertainment Weekly believed the album had "more textured production" than The Sign.

In contrast, Stephen Thomas Erlewine of AllMusic wrote that the album "sounds like the same record on the surface", but also noted that the album featured "an improved sense of songwriting" and "tightly constructed pop songs that are better written than they appear". Despite giving The Sign a higher rating in his review of the album, he noted that The Bridge had songs that were "overall better than the ones on The Sign." Jean Rosenbluth of the Los Angeles Times was more critical in her review, noting that the "inscrutable liner notes are more entertaining" than the album itself.

== Commercial performance ==
The Bridge is certified platinum in the United States, where the album peaked at 29 and spent 29 weeks on the chart. 5 million copies of the album were sold worldwide.

== Track listing ==
European (excluding UK) and Australasian edition
No.	Title	Lyrics	Music	Producer(s)	Length
1.	"Beautiful Life"	Jonas "Joker" Berggren; John Ballard	Joker	Denniz Pop; Max Martin; Joker	3:40
2.	"Never Gonna Say I'm Sorry"	Joker	Joker	Denniz Pop; Martin; Joker	3:16
3.	"Lucky Love"	Joker; Billy Steinberg	Joker	Denniz Pop; Martin; Joker	2:51
4.	"Edge of Heaven"	Ulf "Buddha" Ekberg; Ballard; StoneStream	Buddha; Ballard; StoneStream	Buddha; Ballard; StoneStream	3:49
5.	"Strange Ways"	Linn Berggren	L. Berggren	L. Berggren; Radiant	4:16
6.	"Ravine"	Jenny Berggren	Jenny Berggren	Tommy Ekman; Per Adebratt	4:40
7.	"Perfect World"	Buddha; Ballard; StoneStream	Buddha; Ballard; StoneStream	Buddha; Ballard; StoneStream	3:57
8.	"Angel Eyes"	Joker; Steinberg	Joker	Adebratt; Ekman; Joker	3:13
9.	"Whispers in Blindness"	L. Berggren	L. Berggren	Zal; Linn	4:11
10.	"My Déjà Vu"	Joker	Joker	Adebratt; Douglas Carr; Ekman; Joker	3:22
11.	"You and I"	Joker; Steinberg	Joker	Joker	4:05
12.	"Wave Wet Sand"	Jenny Berggren	Jenny Berggren	Joker	3:18
13.	"Que Sera"	Buddha; Ballard; StoneStream	Buddha; Ballard; StoneStream	Buddha; Ballard; StoneStream	3:47
14.	"Just 'n' Image"	L. Berggren	L. Berggren	Ekman; Adebratt; Linn	3:07
15.	"Lucky Love" (acoustic version)	Joker; Steinberg	Joker	Denniz Pop; Martin; Joker	2:52
16.	"Experience Pearls"	Jenny Berggren	Jenny Berggren	Carr; Bag	3:57
17.	"Blooming 18"	Joker; Steinberg	Joker	Denniz Pop; Martin; Joker	3:38

2015 remastered version
No.	Title	Length
18.	"Love for Sale"	3:05

=== Notes ===
- The original version of "Lucky Love" was excluded from North American and Latin American (excluding Brazilian) editions.
- "You and I" was excluded from North American, Latin American and UK editions.
- The acoustic version of "Lucky Love" was excluded from Japanese and UK editions.
- The Vission Lorimer club mix of "Beautiful Life" and the Armand Van Helden house mix of "Lucky Love" were included on the Japanese edition.

== Release history ==
Region	Date	Label
Europe	30 October 1995	Mega / PolyGram
United States	14 November 1995	Arista
United Kingdom	20 November 1995	London Records 90

== Charts ==
=== Weekly charts ===
Chart (1995–1996)	Peak position
Argentine Albums (CAPIF)	7
Australian Albums (ARIA)	46
Austrian Albums (Ö3 Austria)	10
Belgian Albums (Ultratop Flanders)	34
Belgian Albums (Ultratop Wallonia)	4
Canada Top Albums/CDs (RPM)	9
Dutch Albums (Album Top 100)	17
Finnish Albums (Suomen virallinen lista)	2
French Albums (SNEP)	3
German Albums (Offizielle Top 100)	8
Hungarian Albums (MAHASZ)	6
Japanese Albums (Oricon)	16
New Zealand Albums (RMNZ)	28
Norwegian Albums (VG-lista)	20
Swedish Albums (Sverigetopplistan)	1
Swiss Albums (Schweizer Hitparade)	4
UK Albums (Official Charts)	66
US Billboard 200	29

=== Year-end charts ===
Chart (1995)	Position
French Albums (SNEP)	23

Chart (1996)	Position
French Albums (SNEP)	39
German Albums (Offizielle Top 100)	40
Swiss Albums (Schweizer Hitparade)	24
US Billboard 200	86

== Certifications and sales ==
Region	Certification	Certified units/sales
Canada (Music Canada)	2× Platinum	200,000^{^}
Denmark (IFPI Danmark)	Platinum	50,000^{^}
Finland (Musiikkituottajat)	Platinum	59,097
France (SNEP)	Platinum	300,000^{*}
Germany (BVMI)	Gold	250,000^{^}
Japan (RIAJ)	2× Platinum	500,000
New Zealand (RMNZ)	Platinum	15,000^{^}
Poland (ZPAV)	Gold	50,000^{*}
Russia	—	5,000
Spain (Promusicae)	Gold	50,000^{^}
Sweden (GLF)	Platinum	100,000^{^}
Switzerland (IFPI Switzerland)	Platinum	50,000^{^}
United States (RIAA)	Platinum	1,000,000^{^}
Summaries
Worldwide	—	5,000,000
^{*} Sales figures based on certification alone.^{^} Shipments figures based on certification alone.
