= Words and Pictures =

Words and Pictures can refer to:

- Words & Pictures, a British art magazine in the 1990s
- Words and Pictures (album), a 1997 album by Bob Snider
- Words and Pictures (film), a 2013 American film
- Words and Pictures (TV programme), a British children's television series that ran from 1970 to 2001 on BBC
- Words and Pictures, a 2011 album by Nu:Tone
- Words + Pictures, an American film and television production company founded by Connor Schell
