= Daniel Landin =

British cinematographer

- Born: 1962 (age 63–64)
- Occupation: Cinematographer
- Years active: 1985–present
- Notable work: Under the Skin, The Uninvited
- Awards: Best Cinematography US Dramatic, Sundance Film Festival 2017, Cinematography Prize, Dublin International Film Festival 2014, Gold 'Clio' for Cinematography (2003), D&AD Cinematography Pencil ( 3 x: 2003,2007, 2009), Cinematography Gold Creative Circle (2001, 2006), AICP Honouree in the USA (2005)

Daniel Landin is a British cinematographer known for his work on feature films, commercials, and music videos.

A member of the British Society of Cinematographers, he has collaborated with directors such as Jonathan Glazer and worked on films including Under the Skin (2013).

His cinematography has been recognized for its distinctive visual style and atmospheric composition.

== Career ==
Landin started working with super 8 and VHS video in 1978, collaborating with the industrial music group Throbbing Gristle, documenting live performances and art events.

In 1979, he formed the experimental militant classicist group 'Last Few Days' with Simon Joyce and Keir Fraser, a highly conceptual collective whose primary aim was live performance in unconventional venues (chapels, cinemas, burger bars, silos, tunnels, etc.). Recording was a secondary priority and was mainly live, apart from the 'Polavision' soundtrack produced by Cabaret Voltaire at their Western Works in Sheffield 1982.

As the performances became more ambitious, visual imagery became intrinsic to the events. Working on super 8 and 16mm, Landin created films that were projected during performances. Confrontational events were staged in which synchronized films were simultaneously projected onto multiple screens to accompany challenging and provocative live music. This work continued and led to performing with William S. Burroughs and Brion Gysin at The Final Academy (Brixton Ritzy, 1982).

Further collaborations led to 'The Occupied Europe Tour,' a collaboration between Last Few Days and Yugoslavia's Laibach in 1983 (11 countries in Eastern and Western Europe). This experience of working extensively in the Socialist Bloc and the study of Hungarian Language subsequently led to a commission co-writing The Rough Guide to Eastern Europe (Routledge and Keegan Paul, 1985), which was the first guide for the independent traveler in what was then a relatively unknown and misunderstood region.

Returning to the UK in 1985, Landin studied Fine Art Film and Video at St Martins School of Art, while working as a camera assistant and film extra (including a 3-month stretch in Stanley Kubrick's Full Metal Jacket). After graduating, Landin directed several short films, including A Broken Spine, Ring of Fire (with Kate Cragg), Thou Pluckest Me Out Screaming, and The Child and the Saw (with Richard Heslop), which won 1st Prize 'Golden Dancer' at the Huesca International Film Festival in 1987. His films were exhibited at numerous festivals, including the Berlin Film Festival (Panorama) in 1986, 1989, and 1990, as well as the Edinburgh and London film festivals.

In 1986, Landin directed the film Procar in collaboration with Richard Heslop and Herbert Verhey for live performances in Amsterdam with the Car Ensemble of the Netherlands. The film later appeared at the Berlin International Film Festival in 1987, featuring a remastered audio recording of the Car Ensemble as a soundtrack.

That same year, Landin directed the short film for Laibach's Država, a filmed performance of Laibach and Michael Clark at Sadler's Wells, London, based on Clark's No Fire Escape in Hell.

In 1994, he co-directed Laibach, A Film from Slovenia with Peter Vezjak, featuring Chris Bohn. The documentary explored Laibach's complex polemic and included insights from radical philosopher Slavoj Žižek.

Landin began working as a cinematographer in 1991, initially shooting short films and music videos for artists including The Verve, Oasis, Blur, Pulp, Massive Attack, Björk, Franz Ferdinand, The Rolling Stones, PJ Harvey, David Bowie, Madonna, and Cher. He has also shot numerous television and cinema commercials for brands such as Stella Artois, Giorgio Armani, Sony, BMW, Guinness, Nintendo, Levi's, Wrangler, PlayStation, and Nike.

Following a commission as Director of Photography for Alexander McQueen on his only directing venture (Alarm Call - Björk, 1996), Landin worked in a highly collaborative role with McQueen as a lighting designer, contributing to McQueen's conceptual fashion shows in London, Paris, and New York until 2009.

Using cinema in live events has remained a key interest. In 2012, Landin collaborated with Danny Boyle on the "Isles of Wonder" segment of the London 2012 Olympic Opening Ceremony, shooting staged components for projection and simultaneous broadcast.

== Filmography ==
=== Film ===
Year	Title	Director	Notes
2006	Sixty Six	Paul Weiland	
2009	The Uninvited	Guard Brothers	
2009	44 Inch Chest	Malcolm Venville	
2013	Under the Skin	Jonathan Glazer	
2017	The Yellow Birds	Alexandre Moors	
2019	Ray & Liz	Richard Billingham	
2022	Creature	Asif Kapadia	
2023	Atomen	Kate Cragg	Also producer

Documentary film

Year	Title	Director
2025	Broken English	Iain Forsyth; Jane Pollard

=== Short film ===
Year	Title	Director
1998	The Loved	Nichola Bruce
2001	Baby	W.I.Z.
2002	Shell	Kate Cragg
2005	Starry Night	Ben Miller
2011	The Organ Grinder's Monkey	Dinos Chapman
2013	Kismet Diner	Mark Nunneley
2016	We're the Superhumans	Dougal Wilson
2017	Aura Mugler	Warren Du Preez; Nick Thornton Jones

=== Television ===
Year	Title	Director	Notes
2012	2012 Summer Olympics opening ceremony	Danny Boyle	Segments "Chariots" and "Thanks Tim"
2015	Tom Cruise: Show Me the Movies	Tim Postins	Documentary film

=== Music video ===
Year	Title	Director	Artist
1986	"Država"	Himself	Laibach
1987	"Life is Life"	Himself	Laibach
1987	"Geburt Einer Nation"	Himself	Laibach
1993	Devotional	Anton Corbijn	Depeche Mode
1993	Paul Is Live	Aubrey Powell	Paul McCartney
1995	"Loose"	W.I.Z.	Therapy?
1996	"The 13th"	Sophie Muller	The Cure
1996	"Marblehead Johnson"	Dom and Nic	The Bluetones
1996	"Possibly Maybe"	Stéphane Sednaoui	Björk
1996	"Milk"	Stéphane Sednaoui	Garbage
1997	"She Makes My Nose Bleed"	John Hillcoat	Mansun
1997	"Taxloss"	Roman Coppola	Mansun
1997	"Spin Spin Sugar"	Toby Tremlett	Sneaker Pimps
1997	"Bitter Sweet Symphony"	Walter Stern	The Verve
1997	"I'm Afraid of Americans"	Dom and Nic	David Bowie
1997	Live in the Tragic Kingdom	Sophie Muller	No Doubt
1997	"No Surprises"	Grant Gee	Radiohead
1998	"Teardrop"	Walter Stern	Massive Attack
1998	"Ava Adore"	Dom and Nic	The Smashing Pumpkins
1998	"The Flipside"	Hammer & Tongs	Moloko
1998	"Hunter"	Paul White	Björk
1998	"Alarm Call"	Alexander McQueen	Björk
1998	"Believe"	Nigel Dick	Cher
1999	"When I Grow Up"	Sophie Muller	Garbage
1999	"She's the One"	Dom and Nic	Robbie Williams
1999	"It's Only Us"	Simon Hilton	Robbie Williams
2001	"Hidden Place"	Inez and Vinoodh	Björk
2002	"The Test"	Dom and Nic	The Chemical Brothers
2003	"Butterfly Caught"	Daniel Lévi	Massive Attack
2004	"Caught in a Moment"	Howard Greenhalgh	Sugababes
2005	"Refugees"	AlexandLiane	The Tears
2005	"Walk Away"	Scott Lyon	Franz Ferdinand
2006	"Music Is Power"	John Hillcoat	Richard Ashcroft
2006	"Valerie"	Scott Lyon	The Zutons
2006	"Me Plus One"	Scott Lyon	Kasabian
2008	"4 Minutes"	Jonas & François	Madonna
2009	"Falling Down"	W.I.Z.	Oasis
2010	"Follow Me Down"	Warren Du Preez; Nick Thornton Jones	Unkle
2013	"Young and Beautiful"	Sophie Muller; Chris Sweeney	Lana Del Rey
2013	"Supersoaker"	W.I.Z.	Kings of Leon
2013	"Eat, Sleep, Rave, Repeat"	Mark Waites	Fatboy Slim
2014	"Only Love Can Hurt Like This"	Paul Gore	Paloma Faith
2014	"Trouble with My Baby"	Paul Gore	Paloma Faith
2015	"Like a River"	W.I.Z.	Will Young

== Awards and nominations ==
Year	Title	Award	Category	Status
2010	"Follow Me Down"	Camerimage	Best Cinematography in a Music Video	Nominated
2013	Under the Skin	Audi Dublin International Film Festival	Best Cinematography	Won
2013	Under the Skin	American Society of Cinematographers	Spotlight Award	Nominated
2013	Under the Skin	Central Ohio Film Critics Association	Best Cinematography	Nominated
2013	Under the Skin	Chlotrudis Awards	Best Cinematography	Nominated
2013	Under the Skin	Denver Film Critics Society	Best Cinematography	Nominated
2013	Under the Skin	Fright Meter Awards	Best Cinematography	Nominated
2013	Under the Skin	Indiewire Critics' Poll	Best Cinematography	Nominated
2013	Under the Skin	International Cinephile Society Awards	Best Cinematography	Nominated
2013	Under the Skin	International Online Cinema Awards	Best Cinematography	Nominated
2013	Under the Skin	Online Film Critics Society Awards	Best Cinematography	Nominated
2013	Under the Skin	San Francisco Film Critics Circle	Best Cinematography	Nominated
2013	Under the Skin	Utah Film Critics Association Awards	Best Cinematography	Nominated
2013	Under the Skin	Washington D.C. Area Film Critics Association	Best Cinematography	Nominated
2017	The Yellow Birds	Sundance Film Festival	U.S. Dramatic Special Jury Award for Cinematography	Won
2019	Ray & Liz	Buenos Aires International Film Festival	Best Cinematography	Won
2026	Confessions II – The Film	MTV Video Music Awards	Best Cinematography	Won
2026	Confessions II – The Film	UK Music Video Awards	Best Cinematography in a Video	Nominated
