= Iain Forsyth and Jane Pollard =

British artists and filmmakers

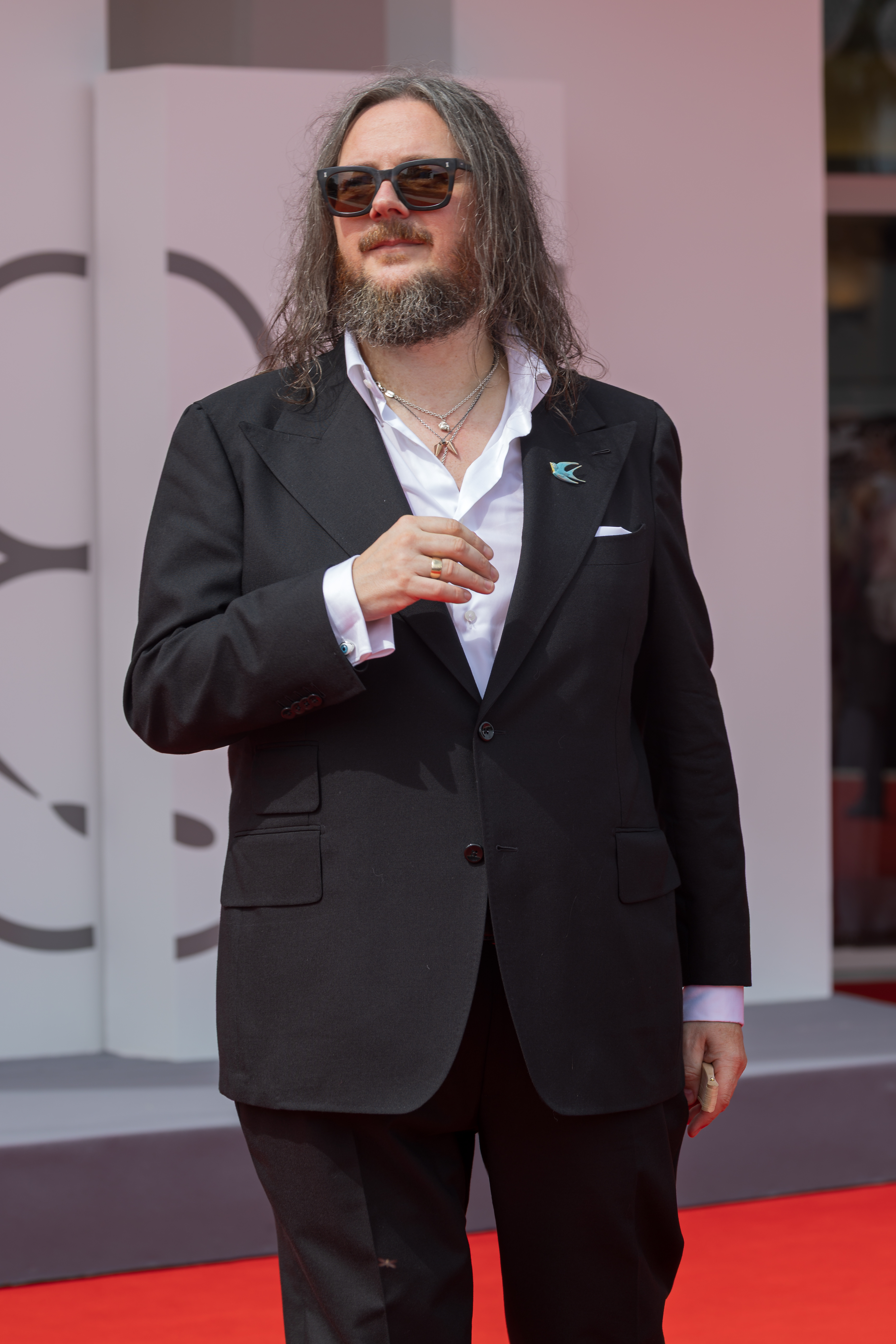
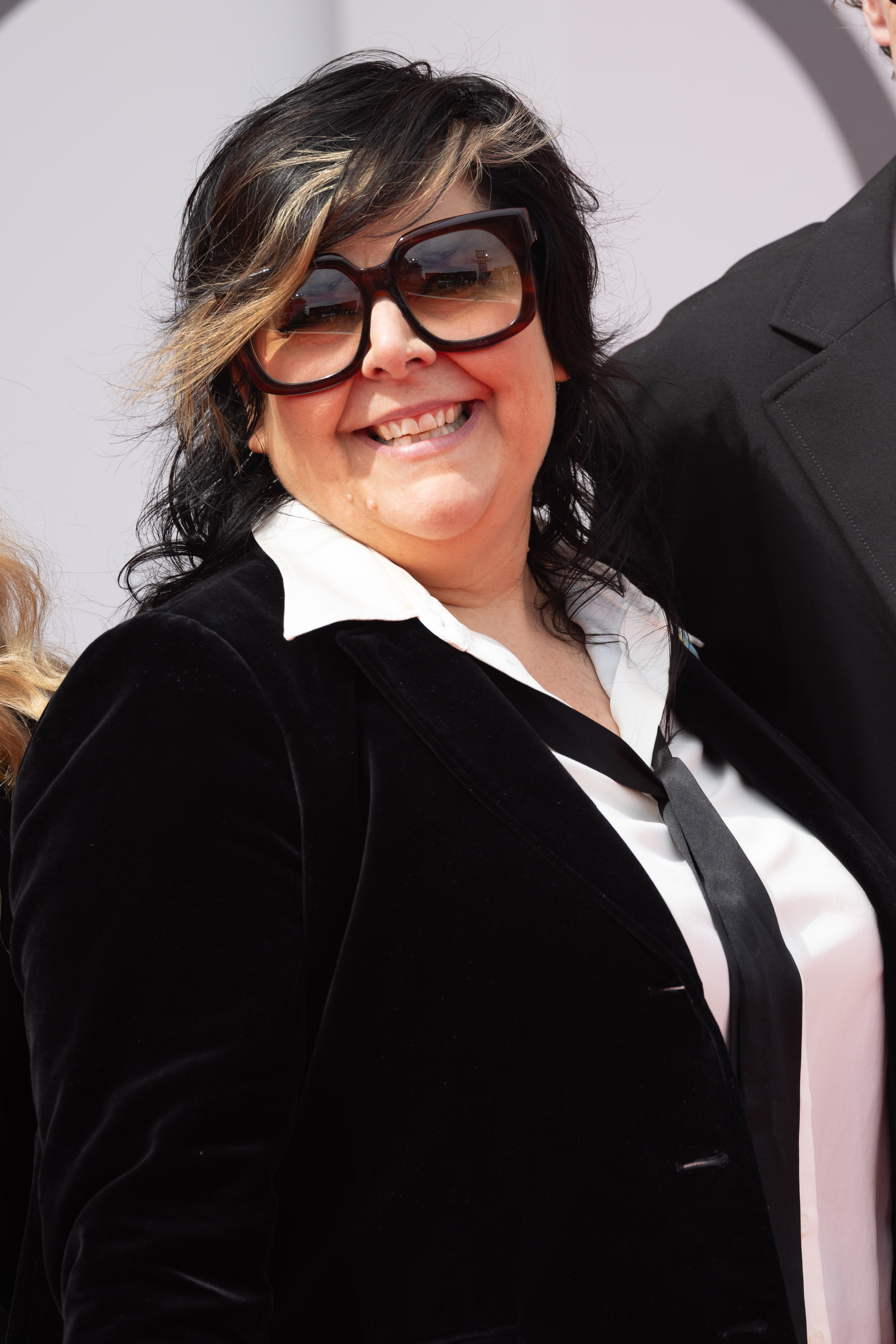
- Forsyth and Pollard in 2025
- Born: 13 February 1973 (age 53); 4 November 1972 (age 53); Bolton, Lancashire, England; Durham, County Durham, England
- Education: Goldsmiths College
- Known for: Video art
- Notable work: File under Sacred Music, Silent Sound, Radio Mania, 20,000 Days on Earth
- Movement: Contemporary Art
- Awards: Winner of Douglas Hickox Award (Best Debut Director) at British Independent Film Awards (2014), Shortlisted for Jarman Award (2014), winner of Golden Athena at Athens International Film Festival, winner of Sundance Directing Award (2014), Great North Run Moving Image Commission (2008), New Contemporaries (1997)
- Website: www.iainandjane.com

Iain Forsyth and Jane Pollard are British artists and filmmakers. They met and began working collaboratively while studying Fine Art and Art Theory at Goldsmiths College, graduating together in 1995. They returned to Goldsmiths in 2002, receiving an MA degree in Fine Art in 2004.

== Work as artists and filmmakers ==
Initially focused on live performance events, but since 2003 their work has been predominantly film and video based.

They have restaged David Bowie's farewell performance as Ziggy Stardust, a 1973 video work by Vito Acconci (working with rap artist Plan B) and a 1968 work by Bruce Nauman. In 2003, the artists recreated the 1978 Cramps performance at the Napa Mental Institute at the ICA in a work entitled File under Sacred Music. The work caused some controversy by including an audience of patients undergoing psychiatric care. The musicians were assembled by Forsyth and Pollard for the project and included Alfonso Pinto from The Parkinsons as Lux Interior, Holly Golightly as Poison Ivy, former Headcoat Bruce Brand as Bryan Gregory and John Gibbs as longtime Cramps drummer Nick Knox.

Silent Sound, featuring an original score by J. Spaceman, was presented at the 2006 Liverpool Biennial. The piece was originally presented as a live performance that took place in the Small Concert Hall at St. George's Hall, Liverpool. It was based, in part, on the public séance act performed by Victorian entertainers The Davenport Brothers. During the performance the artists were seated on-stage inside a soundproof booth based on the Davenport's "Spirit Cabinet". Together they recited a single phrase into a microphone, which was fed into a machine they had created that claimed to embed the phrase as a subliminal message into the music, which was performed live by a small orchestra. The Davenport Brothers had performed their act on the same stage in 1865. The performance was introduced by Ciarán O'Keeffe, a British parapsychologist who became famous after appearing as the resident skeptic on the paranormal television series Most Haunted. An installation of "Silent Sound" was then presented by A Foundation at Greenland Street, Liverpool. An ambisonic recording of the live performance was incorporated into a large-scale immersive installation, created in consultation with acousticians from Arup. The installation was recreated inside a shipping container in 2008 for Art Basel Miami Beach where it was described by The New York Times as "one of the fair's biggest word-of-mouth hits". In 2010 Silent Sound was re-presented as part of the AV Festival at Middlesbrough Town Hall.

Begun while at college, their first project together was publishing "Words & Pictures" - an art magazine in a box. Published three times per year from May 1994 until November 1997 each issue collected together objects made by 20 different artists into an A5 sized cardboard box, produced in a signed and numbered limited edition of 100 copies. A printed booklet was included that contained information on the contributors as well as a specially commissioned preface and introductory text. The first issue was launched at the Institute of Contemporary Arts in London, with a preface by Scottish singer/songwriter Momus and an introduction by artist and writer Liam Gillick. Artists contributing to the project included Martin Creed, Jeremy Deller, Matthew Higgs, Bob and Roberta Smith, Georgina Starr and David Shrigley. Writers for the project included Tracey Emin, Angus Fairhurst, Jake Chapman, Billy Childish and Joshua Compston. Forsyth and Pollard ended the project after 10 issues, citing the influence of the British indie band Felt who released ten albums in ten years and then disbanded.

In 2008 they directed the promo videos for the Nick Cave & The Bad Seeds singles Dig, Lazarus, Dig!!!, "More News From Nowhere" and "Midnight Man". They have also worked with Nick Cave & The Bad Seeds on a series of films relating to each of the 14 studio albums produced by the band. Collectively titled "Do you love me like I love you" each film will feature on a DVD accompanying the album it relates to as part of the remastered Collector's Editions released by Mute Records throughout 2009. Continuing their association with Nick Cave, the duo produced and sound-directed the audiobook for his novel The Death of Bunny Munro, working with the acoustics department at Arup to produce a spatialized binaural mix which creates a 3D effect when played on headphones. It was published by Canongate Books in September 2009.

Occasionally directing music videos for other artists, they have also worked with The Veils, Fanfarlo, Tindersticks, Scott Walker and Gil Scott-Heron.

In 2009 they were commissioned by the British Film Institute to produce a new work for the BFI Gallery (the contemporary art space at BFI Southbank) called "Radio Mania: An Abandoned Work" a multi-screen 3D video installation featuring Kevin Eldon, Caroline Catz, Terrence Hardiman and Fenella Fielding with Martians played by Ben Crompton, Iain Lee and Ben Moor. The project was curated by Elisabetta Fabrizi, who invited the artists to access the BFI National Archive of film and television, the largest of its kind in the world, to create a new commission.

Their first major survey show was presented by the South London Gallery in February–March 2011. In January 2012 they were nominated for the Samsung Art+ Prize.

Iain Forsyth and Jane Pollard are currently represented by Kate MacGarry (London). They have previously worked with Lawrence Eng Gallery (Vancouver) and Galleria Paolo Bonzano (Rome). They are represented as filmmakers by Josh Varney at 42.

Their first feature film was announced by Film4. The hybrid drama-documentary titled 20,000 Days on Earth focuses on the musician and writer Nick Cave, and is backed by Film4, BFI and Corniche Pictures. The film is produced by Pulse Films and JW Films and cinematography is by Erik Wilson (Submarine, Tyrannosaur, The Imposter, The Double). An interview in The Guardian with the directors revealed that the film will also star Kylie Minogue and Ray Winstone. Forsyth & Pollard won the Directing Award at the Sundance Film Festival in January 2014, where the film premiered. The Editing Award was also presented to Jonathan Amos for 20,000 Days on Earth. The European premiere was in February 2014 at Berlinale in Berlin. A theatrical release took place in September 2014 by Picturehouse in the UK, Drafthouse in the US and Madman in Australia.

In 2014 they were shortlisted for the Jarman Award and were awarded a Channel 4 Random Acts Commission. Forsyth and Pollard were presented with the Douglas Hickox Award for best debut director at the 2014 Moët British Independent Film Awards. They have also been BAFTA nominated for Best Documentary and shortlisted for the London Film Critic's Circle Award.

A performance film, The Extraordinary Miss Flower, was released by the BFI in May 2025 starring Emiliana Torrini and Caroline Catz.

Their hybrid documentary Broken English premiered out of competition at the 82nd Venice International Film Festival in 2025. The film stars Tilda Swinton and George MacKay. It's an exploration of the life and career of English singer and actress Marianne Faithfull. The film includes Faithfull's last ever singing performance, together with Nick Cave and Warren Ellis. It had its US premiere at the 2026 Sundance Film Festival and its domestic premiere at the 2025 BFI London Film Festival. The film was released in the United Kingdom on 20 March 2026, by Vue Lumière.

== Work as curators ==
Forsyth and Pollard curated their first exhibition in 1996, in a temporary exhibition space at 85 Charlotte Street, London. The building had previously been the Karsten Schubert gallery. It featured artists from the vibrant mid-90s art scene in London, including Tim Noble and Sue Webster, Tracey Emin, Sam Taylor-Johnson and Stewart Home. Their most large-scale curatorial project was The Horror Show! at Somerset House in October 2022 - February 2023. Featuring over 200 artworks and cultural artefacts. The Guardian said: ″I am starting to think all exhibitions of contemporary art should be curated by artists. Pollard and Forsyth don’t get snagged by the laboured rationalities that often crush shows. You need to think like an artist in order to be able to connect so many gothic strands, strike a pose that’s funny and serious at the same time, and leave us unsure whether we should laugh or scream or cry.″ In 2026 they were appointed curators-in-residence at The Fitzrovia Chapel.

== Filmography ==
=== Feature films ===
Year	Film	Credited as				Production Companies	Notes
Year	Film	Director	Producer	Writer	Other	Production Companies	Notes
2025	Broken English	Yes	Beth Earl	Yes, with Ian Martin and Will Maclean	Premiered at the 82nd Venice International Film Festival	Rustic Canyon Pictures and Phantoscopic	Featuring Marianne Faithfull with Tilda Swinton and George MacKay
2024	The Extraordinary Miss Flower	Yes	Zoe Flower	Stuart Evers	Released in the UK by BFI	Distiller, Anti-Worlds, Phantoscopic	Featuring Emilana Torrini
2014	20,000 Days on Earth	Yes	James Wilson, Dan Bowen	Yes, with Nick Cave	Produced by Pulse Films and JW Films	Film4 BFI Corniche Pictures	Featuring Nick Cave

=== Short films ===
Year	Film	Credited as			Notes
Year	Film	Director	Producer	Editor	Notes
2015	Who Is Gil Scott-Heron?	Yes		Commissioned by Richard Russell. Premier UK Screening at FACT Cinema Liverpool in collaboration with Fore-Word Press	
2014	EDIT	Yes	Katie Nicoll	Jonathan Amos	Collaboration with Joe McAlinden. Premiered at Edinburgh International Film Festival
2013	Jumpers (What must I do to be saved)	Yes	Cally Spooner	Rachael Spann	Commissioned by Live at LICA. Music by Warren Ellis
2010	I'm New Here	Yes	Natalie Johns	Dominic Leung	Music promo clip for Gil Scott-Heron
2009-11	Do you love me like I love you	Yes	Yes	Yes	Documentary in 14 parts commissioned by Nick Cave & The Bad Seeds and Mute Records
2010	First Kiss	Yes	Yes	Yes	Music by Joe McAlinden
2008	Run For Me	Yes	Yes	Yes	Winner of the Great North Run Moving Image Commission 2008
2007	Dig, Lazarus, Dig!!!	Yes	Ruby Wright	Yes	Music promo clip for Nick Cave & The Bad Seeds
2005	Walking After Acconci (Redirected Approaches)	Yes	Yes	Robin Mahoney	Featuring Ben Drew (aka Plan B)
2005	Anyone else isn't you	Yes	Yes	Yes	Included in the Tate Gallery Collection
2003	File under Sacred Music	Yes	Vivienne Gaskin	Robin Mahoney	Commissioned by Arts Council England and the BBC

== Collections ==
Public collections include:

- Tate Gallery
- Arts Council Collection
- Zabludowicz Collection
- Government Art Collection
- Musée d’art moderne Grand-Duc Jean Luxembourg (Mudam)
- Museum De Hallen, Haarlem
- BFI National Archive

== Exhibitions ==
Solo Exhibitions

- 2013 Bish Bosch: Ambisymphonic (with Scott Walker), Sydney Opera House
- 2013 Jumpers (What must I do to be saved), Live at LICA, Lancaster
- 2011 Audience/Performer, Lighthouse, Brighton
- 2011 New Work, Kate MacGarry, London
- 2011 Romeo Echo Delta, FACT Liverpool and BBC Radio Merseyside
- 2011 Soon, Nuit Blanche, Toronto
- 2011 PUBLICSFEAR, South London Gallery, London
- 2010 Silent Sound, AV Festival, Middlesbrough
- 2009 Radio Mania: An Abandoned Work, BFI Gallery, London (curated by Elisabetta Fabrizi)
- 2009 Iain Forsyth & Jane Pollard, Void Gallery, Derry
- 2009 Performer. Audience. Fuck Off., Site Gallery, Sheffield (performed by Iain Lee)
- 2008 Run For Me, Great North Run Moving Image Commission, Baltic Centre for Contemporary Art, Gateshead
- 2008 Walking Over Acconci (Misdirected Reproaches), Kate MacGarry, London
- 2008 "Run For Me" Artprojx at Prince Charles Cinema, London (introduced by Andrew Graham-Dixon)
- 2008 "Iain Forsyth & Jane Pollard", Lawrence Eng, Vancouver
- 2007 Silent Sound, Art Basel Miami Beach/ Art Positions
- 2007 Grain - an exploration of contemporary landscape using sound, Grain Power Station, Isle of Grain, Kent
- 2007 The 24 seven, Milton Keynes Gallery Project
- 2007 Precious Little, Moving Image Centre Toi Rerehiko, Auckland, New Zealand, touring to The Physics Room, Christchurch
- 2007 The Weasel: Pop Music and Contemporary Art, South London Gallery
- 2007 Kiss My Nauman, Jarvis Cocker’s Meltdown, Southbank Centre, London
- 2006 Silent Sound, A Foundation/Greenland Street, Liverpool
- 2006 In Brief, Jerwood Space, London
- 2005 Anyone else isn't you, George Rodger Gallery, Maidstone
- 2005 Walking After Acconci (Redirected Approaches), Kate MacGarry, London
- 2005 Anyone else isn't you, The Hospital, Covent Garden, London
- 2004 Everybody else is wrong, Pavilion, Montreal, Canada
- 2003 File under Sacred Music, Institute of Contemporary Arts, London
- 1998 A Rock 'N' Roll Suicide, Institute of Contemporary Arts, London
- 1998 The kids are alright, Institute of Contemporary Arts, London
- 1997 The Smiths is dead, Institute of Contemporary Arts, London
- 1997 Doing it for the Kids, Bluecoat Arts Centre, Liverpool
- 1996 The World Won't Listen, 30 Underwood Street, London
