= Car Ensemble of the Netherlands =

Dutch car and instrument orchestra

Car Ensemble of the Netherlands; Rotterdam, Netherlands, 1984

Car Ensemble of the Netherlands; Düsseldorf, Germany, 1985

The Car Ensemble of the Netherlands ("Nederlands Auto Ensemble") was a Dutch orchestra with a line-up of both cars and instruments and gave a number of performances in the Netherlands and Germany from 1984 until 1987.

== History ==
The Car Ensemble was founded in Rotterdam in 1984 by the Dutch artist and designer Herbert Verhey and had its premiere that year in the Tom Tom Club in that city.

The scores were built up of blocks with improvisation instructions to which the conductor had the opportunity to allow each segment a longer or shorter duration. The Car Ensemble made use of engine sounds, car horns, the sound of doors and car radios, mixed with vocals, saxophone and percussion. Those who operated the cars in the orchestra mostly had previously been involved with the Concert For Thirty Cars ("Concert voor 30 Autos") by Herbert Verhey, performed on 23 October 1983 at a remote helicopter platform near Rotterdam.

On invitation of the Goethe Institut, the Car Ensemble performed on 5 September 1985 in Düsseldorf, Germany. The cars for that occasion were operated by the local artists Marcel Hardung, Adolf Lechtenberg, Julia Lohmann, Gisela Kleinlein and Klaus Richter. The musicians were from the Netherlands: Marjo Kroese (vocals), Bob Stoute (percussion) and Alan Purves (percussion). A recording of this concert was issued in 1986 on flexi disc by Time Based Arts in Amsterdam.

For performances of the Car Ensemble in Amsterdam on 13 and 14 June 1986, in the framework of the Romantic Aesthetics Festival, a drive-in cinema was set up whereby the Car Ensemble made use of a local radio station to broadcast additional sounds, conversations and instructions to the audience in their cars. The British cinematographers Richard Heslop and Daniel Landin for that occasion were invited to direct a film, Procar in cooperation with Herbert Verhey and to be used for back-drop projection. The remastered audio recording of the event later on became the soundtrack of the film. In 1987, Procar (16 mm, black and white, 19 mins.) was screened at the Berlin International Film Festival.

The last performance of the Car Ensemble was on 16 August 1987, at the invitation of the Boulevard of Broken Dreams, a theatre festival held that year in 's-Hertogenbosch. The Car Ensemble for that occasion worked together with the Dutch artist Willem de Ridder, whereby the latter in a radio broadcast directed citizens with their cars to a parking lot in the city to take part in the orchestra.

Although dissolved by Verhey in the fall of 1987, he gave one final performance with the Car Ensemble ("Nederlands Auto Ensemble") in June 1990 in Hilversum (the Netherlands) on request of Han Reiziger for his TV program on classical and contemporary music, Reiziger in Muziek. Han Reiziger—who in 1983 had also broadcast the Concert For Thirty Cars—then operated one of the cars of the orchestra.
