= Broken English (2025 film) =

2025 documentary film

- Theatrical release poster
- Directed by: Iain Forsyth; Jane Pollard
- Written by: Iain Forsyth; Ian Martin; Jane Pollard
- Produced by: Beth Earl
- Starring: Marianne Faithfull; Tilda Swinton; George MacKay
- Cinematography: Daniel Landin
- Edited by: Luke Clayton Thompson
- Music by: Rob Ellis; Adrian Utley
- Production companies: Rustic Canyon Pictures; Phantoscopic
- Distributed by: Vue Lumière
- Release dates: 30 August 2025 (Venice); 20 March 2026 (United Kingdom)
- Running time: 99 minutes
- Country: United Kingdom
- Language: English

Broken English is a 2025 British documentary film written and directed by Iain Forsyth and Jane Pollard. It's an exploration of the life and career of English singer and actress Marianne Faithfull, who died 30th January 2025.

The film premiered out of competition at the 82nd Venice International Film Festival on 30 August 2025. It was theatrically released in the United Kingdom by Vue Lumière on 20 March 2026.

== Production ==
Forsyth and Pollard approached Faithfull and started working on the project in 2021. The film includes Faithfull's last ever singing performance, together with Nick Cave and Warren Ellis. Actors Tilda Swinton and George MacKay play two fictional characters, while interviewees include John Dunbar, Edith Bowman, Sophie Fiennes and Barry Reynolds.

The film was produced by Rustic Canyon Pictures and Phantoscopic. Several scenes, including those featuring Marianne Faithfull, were filmed at Elstree Studios in Borehamwood.

== Release ==
The film premiered out of competition at the 82nd edition of the Venice Film Festival. It was later screened at the 2025 Toronto International Film Festival. It had its domestic premiere at the 2025 BFI London Film Festival. The film was released in the United Kingdom on 20 March 2026, by Vue Lumière.

== Reception ==
On the review aggregator website Rotten Tomatoes, 88% of 26 critics' reviews are positive.

Leslie Felperin of The Hollywood Reporter described the film as "a fittingly weird and wacky portrait of a woman whose career was full of swerves and swoops", with "the scripted sections" that "don't always mesh effectively with the more spontaneous, doc-style interludes, but they serve to clarify the timelines and relationships and add editorial gloss". Deadline's film critic Damon Wise called the film a "witty, provocative, and playfully post-modern docu-bio" and a "moving tribute".

Xan Brooks of The Guardian was less positive, calling the film "flawed but ardent", and noting "Forsyth and Pollard’s main conceit feels jerry-rigged and overdramatised to the point where it risks obscuring our view of the woman herself".
