= Dee Monk =

Eurodance group

Dee Monk was a Eurodance group from Belgrade that became popular in the 1990s in Serbia and Montenegro. The group then received even broader recognition, especially in: Slovenia, Croatia, Bosnia, Macedonia and the rest of the Balkans.

Dee Monk has recorded only one album titled Samo želim da znam ("I just want to know"). Their most famous hit was "Samo želim da znam" which was released in 1994. Members of this group were Saša Novaković and Alma Micic (Vucinic) who is now an established jazz vocalist living in NYC.

Dee Monk paused for some years, and in 2010 returned to the eurodance scene with new songs. In 2010 they released the song "Sad Znam" with Ivana Krunic. Also, in 2010 they worked with the ex "Luna" member Zejna Murkić and recorded the song "Tonight". He also recorded a song with rapper Shwarz titled "Uzmi sve što ti dam". Dee Monk is one of the most famous Ex-YU groups.
