= Lucky Love =

1995 single by Ace of Base

- Standard European artwork (Scandinavian CD single pictured)

Single by Ace of Base

from the album The Bridge
- Released: 2 October 1995
- Genre: Pop; reggae fusion
- Length: 2:52
- Label: Mega
- Songwriters: Jonas Berggren; Billy Steinberg
- Producers: Denniz PoP; Max Martin; Jonas Berggren

Ace of Base singles chronology
"Living in Danger" (1994)	"Lucky Love" (1995)	"Beautiful Life" (1995)

Music video
- "Lucky Love" on YouTube "Lucky Love" (acoustic version) on YouTube

"Lucky Love" is a song recorded by Swedish group Ace of Base, released in October 1995 by Mega Records. It is written by Jonas Berggren and Billy Steinberg, and produced by Berggren with Denniz PoP and Max Martin. The song is taken from the group's second album, The Bridge (1995), becoming their fifth worldwide single, and the first single from the album to be released in Europe; the acoustic version of the song was the second single in the United States and Canada. "Lucky Love" also became the group's first number-one hit in Sweden and also peaked at number one in Finland. The single entered the top 10 in Belgium, Canada, Denmark, France, Hungary, Israel, Spain, and Zimbabwe. The song's lyrics describe the feeling of being a teenager in love and never forgetting that feeling.

The song was performed for the first time on 4 August 1995 during the 1995 World Championships in Athletics opening ceremony in Gothenburg. It received its radio premiere on 25 September, ahead of its commercial release on 2 October. Two different music videos were released for the single; one of them was directed by Rocky Schenck.

== Chart performance ==
"Lucky Love" was very successful on the charts on several continents, becoming one of the group's biggest hits to date. In Europe, the single reached number-one in Finland, Latvia and Sweden, and became a top-10 hit also in Belgium, Denmark (#2), France, Hungary (#4) and Spain, as well as on the Eurochart Hot 100, where the single peaked at number six. In Sweden, it was the first single by Ace of Base to reach the top position on Sverigetopplistan.

Additionally, "Lucky Love" was a top-20 hit in Austria, Germany, Italy, the Netherlands, Norway, Switzerland and the UK. In the latter, it peaked at number 20 in its first week at the UK Singles Chart on November 5, 1995. It stayed at that position for two weeks. Outside Europe, the single charted in West Asia, where it became a top-five hit in Israel, both peaking and debuting as number five on October 24. It spent two weeks at that position on the Israeli top 30. In North America, "Lucky Love" reached number-one on the US Billboard Dance Club Songs chart on March 23, 1996. It also peaked at number six in Canada, number 29 on the US Cash Box Top 100 and number 30 on the US Billboard Hot 100. In Africa, it peaked at number nine in Zimbabwe, while in Oceania, it reached numbers 12 and 30 in New Zealand and Australia, respectively.

== Critical reception ==
AllMusic editor Bryan Buss praised 'Lucky Love' as a "pretty" song. Larry Flick from Billboard magazine constated that "this is the single that the act's diehard fans have been screaming for", adding that it is "far more substantial and satisfying" than 'Beautiful Life', and "rides a brainseeping chorus that you will be singing to yourself whether you want to or not." Steve Baltin from Cash Box wrote that songs like 'Lucky Love' "work because the band downplays the dance sound, displaying some nice understated pop hooks." James Masterton for Dotmusic opined that it "doesn't mark much of a progression from their earlier work, which is either a sign of stagnancy or a pretty shrewd move, depending on your point of view." Dave Sholin from the Gavin Report commented, "Proving their particular style of music comes in all shapes and colors, Jenny, Linn, Buddha, and Joker roll into '96 with a song that people like B96-Chicago MD Erik Bradley were testifying about long before the end of last year. 'Lucky Love' was released as their first single in the U.K., where it became an instant smash—a fact that should come as no big surprise to anyone who's heard the song. More than a few programmers predict Number One, and you'll get no argument here."

Ross Jones from The Guardian complimented it as "quite a pretty tune". Robbie Daw from Idolator described it as "bouncy". Jean Rosenbluth from Los Angeles Times deemed it "eminently hummable". Brian A. Gnatt from The Michigan Daily named it "the best track" from the album, "with its incredibly warm feel and catchy chorus." He added that it "tackles new ground for the band and captures it easily." Pan-European magazine Music & Media noted that "all the hits from the Happy Nation CD are a hard act to follow, but the Swedish quartet succeeds here hands down. Are they maybe on a special frequency allowing them to download top melodies?" Chuck Campbell from Scripps Howard News Service called it "merely competent." Gavin Reeve from Smash Hits wrote, "It's yet another dose of hypnotism from those pesky Paul McKennas of pop. You'll be singing along after half a second, you'll rush out and buy it and proceed to play it 800 squillion times."

== Music video ==
Two different music videos were produced for the song. One for the European market and another for the US market. In Europe, it was A-listed on German music television channel VIVA in November 1995. The following month, "Lucky Love" received heavy rotation on MTV Europe. The European version was later published on Ace of Base's official YouTube channel in 2015 and had generated more than ten million views as of 2025.

=== European version ===
The first, released in Europe, directed by American photographer and music video director Rocky Schenck and featuring the original version of the song, focuses on a middle-aged woman reuniting with the boyfriend she had as a teenager. The band is seen around the actors in the video and also through footage shot by the band themselves using a handheld video camera. The video was shot in Gothenburg, Sweden in August 1995. An alternate edit of this version featuring the acoustic version of the song was featured on the 2008 Greatest Hits DVD.

=== US version (acoustic version) ===
The second video, released in North America and featuring the acoustic version of the song, focuses on several young couples interacting in various scenarios with shots of the band cut in. A shot of the video for "Beautiful Life" can be seen on a television screen in this version. This version was filmed on 29 and 30 January 1996 at Hampton Court House.

== Track listings ==
- CD single, Australia
1. "Lucky Love" – 2:52
2. "Lucky Love" (acoustic version) – 2:52
3. "Lucky Love" (extended original version) – 4:49
- CD single, US
1. "Lucky Love" (acoustic version) – 2:52
2. "Lucky Love" (Frankie Knuckles Edit) – 3:41
- CD maxi, UK
1. "Lucky Love" – 2:52
2. "Lucky Love" (acoustic version) – 2:52
3. "Lucky Love" (Raggasol Version) – 2:53
4. "Lucky Love" (Amadin Mix) – 5:39
5. "Lucky Love" (Armand's British Nites Mix) – 11:21
- CD maxi, US
1. "Lucky Love" (Frankie Knuckles Classic Club Mix) – 7:22
2. "Lucky Love" (Vission Lorimer Funkdified Mix) – 6:02
3. "Lucky Love" (Amadin Mix) – 5:39
4. "Lucky Love" (Lenny B's Club Mix) – 7:08
5. "Lucky Love" (Armand's British Nites Mix) – 11:21
6. "Lucky Love" (acoustic version) – 2:52

== Personnel ==
- Vocals by Linn Berggren, Jenny Berggren
- Backing Vocals by Jeanette Söderholm
- Guitar by Chuck Anthony and Jonas Berggren
- Fretless Bass by Per Ahlström
- Music by Jonas Berggren
- Lyrics by Jonas Berggren and Billy Steinberg
- Produced by Denniz Pop, Max Martin and Jonas Berggren
- Recorded and produced at Cheiron Studios

== Charts ==
=== Weekly charts ===
Chart (1995–1996)	Peak position
Australia (ARIA)	30
Austria (Ö3 Austria Top 40)	14
Belgium (Ultratop 50 Flanders)	24
Belgium (Ultratop 50 Wallonia)	9
Canada Top Singles (RPM)	6
Canada Adult Contemporary (RPM)	17
Canada Dance/Urban (RPM)	2
Denmark (IFPI)	2
Europe (Eurochart Hot 100)	6
Europe (European Hit Radio)	2
Europe (Border Breakers)	1
Finland (Suomen virallinen lista)	1
France (SNEP)	9
Germany (GfK)	13
Hungary (Mahasz)	4
Iceland (Íslenski Listinn Topp 40)	23
Israel (Israeli Singles Chart)	5
Italy (Musica e dischi)	19
Italy Airplay (Music & Media)	1
Latvia (Latvijas Top 50)	1
Netherlands (Dutch Top 40)	15
Netherlands (Single Top 100)	16
New Zealand (Recorded Music NZ)	12
Norway (VG-lista)	12
Quebec (ADISQ)	4
Scottish Singles Sales (Official Charts)	20
Spain (AFYVE)	6
Sweden (Sverigetopplistan)	1
Switzerland (Schweizer Hitparade)	19
UK Singles (Official Charts)	20
UK Club Chart (Music Week)	10
US Billboard Hot 100	30
US Adult Pop Airplay (Billboard)	33
US Dance Club Songs (Billboard)	1
US Hot Dance Singles Sales (Billboard)	4
US Pop Airplay (Billboard)	19
US Rhythmic Airplay (Billboard)	25
US Cash Box Top 100	29
Zimbabwe (ZIMA)	9

=== Year-end charts ===
Chart (1995)	Position
Belgium (Ultratop 50 Wallonia)	75
Europe (Eurochart Hot 100)	37
France (SNEP)	48
Israel (Israeli Singles Chart)	22
Latvia (Latvijas Top 50)	34
Netherlands (Dutch Top 40)	132
Sweden (Topplistan)	28

Chart (1996)	Position
Canada Top Singles (RPM)	66
Canada Dance/Urban (RPM)	48
Latvia (Latvijas Top 50)	177
US Top 40/Mainstream (Billboard)	75
US Top 40/Rhythm-Crossover (Billboard)	94

== Release history ==
Region	Date	Label(s)	Ref.
Europe	2 October 1995	Mega	
United Kingdom	30 October 1995	London	
Australia	6 November 1995	Mega; Metronome; Barclay; Polydor	
Australia	4 December 1995 (remixes)	Mega; Metronome; Barclay; Polydor	
United States	6 February 1996	Arista	
Japan	23 March 1996	Arista; BMG	
