= Words & Pictures =

Art magazine published between 1994 and 1997

Words & Pictures was an object-based art magazine published between 1994 and 1997, each issue in a signed and numbered limited edition. It was published by British artists Iain Forsyth and Jane Pollard. Complete sets exist in several public collections, including the Tate Gallery in London, the National Art Library at the Victoria and Albert Museum, Yale Center for British Art in the USA. More than 200 artists and writers contributed to the project, including several Turner Prize winners.

== History ==
Forsyth and Pollard launched the magazine with a low-key pilot issue, while they were students at Goldsmiths College. They were influenced by the DIY ethic of punk and fanzines being produced in the British independent music scene. The first issue was launched at the Institute of Contemporary Arts in London in November 1994. It included contributions from 35 artists, who each hand-made their contribution in a limited edition of 100 copies, which are each signed and numbered by the artist. The 'object-magazine' was contained inside an A5 sized cardboard box. Also inside each box was a printed booklet produced by Forsyth and Pollard that contained information about each contributor and a specially commissioned preface and introductory text. Issues 2-9 included contributions from 20 artists, with issue 10 returning to the format of issue 1 and including 35 artists. The magazine was published three times per year until November 1997 when the final issue was again launched at the ICA in London.

Every issue of the magazine was accompanied by a launch party, some of which included live music and performances from some of the contributors. Launch venues included the Artist Book Fair at the Royal Festival Hall, The Cabinet Gallery in Brixton, The Serpentine Gallery Bookshop, the Barbican Centre and the Eagle Gallery in Farringdon.

Although named only Words & Pictures for the pilot issue, from issue 1 onwards the title was expanded to include a phrase created by Momus in his preface text for the issue, giving the project the full title it would be known by for the remaining ten issues: Words & Pictures - Ultra-Paranoid (Extra-Spatial) Portable Art!

== Contributors ==
Issue 10 November 1997

- Epilogue by Momus
- Conclusion by Liam Gillick

Russell Bamber, Roger Bates, David Campany, JJ Charlesworth, Martin Creed, Jeremy Deller, Ben Dray, Nick Dunn and Philip Jones, Iain Forsyth and Jane Pollard, Sarah Hardy, Matthew Higgs, MH Holmes, Daniel Howard-Birt, Andrew Hunt, Mark Jessett, Tony Kemplen, Magnus Lawrie, Peter Lewis, Richard Makin, Adam J Maynard with the Institute of Open Studies, Dermot O'Brien, Kevin O'Neill, Jane Ormerod, Simon Periton, Hadrian Pigott, Giorgio Sadotti, David Shrigley, Lesley Smailes, Bob and Roberta Smith, Polly Staple, Georgina Starr, Andre Stitt, John Timberlake, Gavin Turk, Jessica Voorsanger

Issue 9 July 1997

- Foreword by Neil Crawford
- Introduction by Neil Crawford

Tim Bailey, Russell Bamber, Roger Bates, David Campany, Imogen Clarke, Alistair Dickson, Iain Forsyth and Jane Pollard, Anne Hardy, Louise Hayward, Daniel Howard-Birt, Elisa Hudson, Andrew Hunt, Anne-Marie Lequesne, Wayne Lloyd, Matthew Maxwell, Adam J Maynard, Anna Mossman, Jane Parrish, Tim Smare, Fiona Wright

Issue 8 March 1997

- Preface by Angus Fairhurst
- Introduction by Simon Ford

David Adkins, Becky Beasley, Nicholas, Andrea Draper, Iain Forsyth and Jane Pollard, Christopher Helson, Raymond Henshaw and Paul Gratten, Andrew Hunt, Karen Hurd, Samira Kafala, Alan Kane, Tony Kemplen, Daniel Kidner, Adam J Maynard, Kevin O' Neill, Deb Rindl, Giorgio Sadotti, Melanie Verhille, Michael Wilson, Carol Ann Wingrave

Issue 7 November 1996

- Preface by Billy Childish
- Introduction by Simon Cutts

Ingrid Alexandra, Iris Athanasoula, Robert Bird D Breckon, Patricia Collins, Paul Deller, Iain Forsyth and Jane Pollard, Gill and Grant, Simon Goodwin, Jun Hasegawa, Andrew Herman, Daniel Howard-Birt, Mark Jessett, Richard Makin, Adam J Maynard, Paul Mcdevitt, Stacey Righton, Polly Staple, Virgil Tracy, Emma Underhill

Issue 6 July 1996

- Preface by Simon Bill
- Introduction by Andrew Wilson

Johnny Ape, Marc Atkins, Badstock Beard Partnership, Martin Creed, Jeremy Deller, Nick Dunn and Philip Jones, Iain Forsyth and Jane Pollard, Toby Hardwick, Sarah Hardy, J Hayward, Lee Jay Keeper, Tony Kemplen, Colin Lowe / Roddy Thomson, Adam J Maynard, Adam McEwen, Jane Ormerod, Brendan Quick, David Shrigley, Bridget Smith, David Tonge

Issue 5 March 1996

- Preface by Max Wigram
- Introduction by Jake Chapman

Peter Abrahams, Roger Bates, Jo Braddock, Ken Cockburn, Pamela Dunsdon, Andrew Ekins, Iain Forsyth and Jane Pollard, Lucas Golding, Toby Hardwick, Matthew Higgs, Gabriel Kuri, Adam J Maynard, John Mitchell, Clement Page, Carrie Reichardt, Stephen Roden, Bob and Roberta Smith, Clare Thompson, Jessica Voorsanger, Stef Zelynskyj

Issue 4 November 1995

- Preface by Tracey Emin
- Introduction by Martin Maloney

Lee Beech, Ben Dray, Annabel Elgar, Iain Forsyth and Jane Pollard, Simon Goodwin, M H Holmes, Neil Jenkins, Tony Kemplen, Magnus Lawrie, Dominic Mason, David McConnachie, Marion Michell, Jane Ormerod, Deb Rindl, Andre Stitt, Joanne Tatham, Virgil Tracy, Michael Turner, Wells and Shaw, Felix Zakar

Issue 3 July 1995

- Preface by Joshua Compston
- Introduction by Stewart Home

Chris Bingham, Stephen Carter, Andrew Ekins, Sarah Felton, Field Study, Leo Fitzmaurice, Iain Forsyth and Jane Pollard, Julie A Freeman, Antonia Hirsch, Emily J Jolley, Richard Makin, Vlado Martek, Adam J Maynard, John Mitchell, Vikki Oppenheim, Joseph Ortenzi, Clement Page, Vernon Thornton, Simon Warren

Issue 2 March 1995

- Preface by Jeremy Millar
- Introduction by Dr. Sarat Maharaj

V Allen, James Archer, Patricia Collins, Susan C Cutts, Stefan Dowsing, Iain Forsyth and Jane Pollard, Bettina Furnee, Asako Kameyama, Tony Kemplen, John Lambert, Richard Makin, Adam J Maynard, James Newton, Martin O'Neill, Stuart Penny, Dominique Rey, J P Thurlow, Oliver Varney, Rupert White, Felix Zakar

Issue 1 November 1994

- Preface by Momus
- Introduction by Liam Gillick

Martha Aitchison, James Archer, Stuart Bastick, Guy Bigland, A D Bradbury, Rodger Brown, Matt Carless, JJ Charlesworth, Patricia Collins, Simon Collins, Tristan Dellaway, Royston du Maurier Lebek, Field Study, Iain Forsyth, Nigel Grimmer, Antonia Hirsch, Matthew Holker, A C Hutchinson, Tony Kemplen, Chris Kenny, Christine Kummer, Geraldine Marks, Adam J Maynard, Maedhbhina McCombe, John Mitchell, Louise Ockenden, Andrew Payne, Ita Plattner, Jane Pollard, Marija Mojca Pungercar, Rachel Ramirez, Damon Summersgill, Geoff Swann, J P Thurlow, Simon Warren

== The end ==
The final issue (issue 10) was published in November 1997. Forsyth and Pollard cite the influence of British indie band Felt whose frontman Lawrence claimed that it was his intention to release ten albums and ten singles in ten years and then disband. The final issue included an epilogue by Momus, who had written the preface to the first issue, and a conclusion by Liam Gillick, who had written the first introduction.

The closing party was held at the ICA, where the first issue had been launched. The event took place on the same night that Sensation opened at the Royal Academy. Three former contributors were invited to perform; Tracey Emin was unable to attend due to prior commitments so made a video of herself reading C.V. the text she had contributed to issue 4. This film is now part of the collection of the Tate Gallery. Billy Childish performed a series of his poetry and songs, including his text for Words & Pictures and Momus concluded the party with a live set, including a reading of his text.

Since 1997 Forsyth and Pollard have concentrated on their own career as collaborative artists and have had no further involvement with publishing or curating.
