= The Apparition Phase =

Horror novel by Will Maclean

First edition (publ. Heinemann)

The Apparition Phase is a ghost story novel by Will Maclean (co-creator of the Broken Veil audio series with Joel Morris) that was published in hardback on October 29, 2020 and paperback on October 14, 2021.

== Background ==
The author included a piecemeal short story scattered throughout one thousand signed copies of the book.

== Plot ==
In the early 1970s, Tim and Abi, a pair of precocious twins obsessed with macabre subjects, fake a ghost photograph in order to scare a schoolmate, Janice Tupp. The prank succeeds beyond their expectations, and Janice faints in class at school, cutting her head. Terrified that they'll get into trouble, Tim and Abi invite Janice to their home and show her how the picture was faked. Janice, however, insists they have, in fact, taken a real photo of a ghost, "Or will have done, soon." The second half of the book follows the adolescent Tim, a few years later, as he joins a group of other teenagers in a psychic experiment at an old house in Suffolk.

== Reception ==
The Guardian called it "the perfect novel for our phantom present."

The Sublime Horror called it "a pitch-perfect evocation of the haunted 1970s."

The Caffeinated Reader gave it a 4.5 out 5 Cup review.

== Awards ==
The novel was shortlisted for the 2021 McKitterick Prize. It won the Dracula Society's Children of the Night Award.
