= Richard Heslop (director) =

British director of music videos and films

Richard Heslop (born 1961) is a British director of music videos and films. He has produced videos for artists including Queen, The Cure, and New Order, as well as programmes on Channel 4 and the BBC. He has also been credited as a cinematographer and camera operator.

== Biography ==
In 1986 he made the film Procar (16 mm, black and white, 19 mins.) in collaboration with Daniel Landin and Herbert Verhey with his Car Ensemble of the Netherlands (Nederlands Auto Ensemble) for live performances in Amsterdam during the Romantic Aesthetics Festival. For this project, a two-day drive-in cinema was built in the centre of the city. The film was shown later that year at the Berlin Film Festival and released as part of a compilation of British short films 1984-1987 called Fat of the Land which also included an early Tilda Swinton short The Sluggard by Joy Perino and work by Cerith Wyn Evens.

In the 80s he started to create photo-montages that were exhibited in The London Gallery. He also continued his career as director of music videos, including clips for New Order, Happy Mondays ("Wrote for Luck" "24 Hour Party People" and "Hallelujah"), Pop Will Eat Itself and The Mighty Lemon Drops. During the same period, he started Trigger Happy Films which would produce many videos including Unbelievable by EMF.

In 1991 for Channel 4, Heslop wrote and directed Floating, a 39 min film about a Docklands bus driver who, on the verge of a nervous breakdown, destroys his house to build an ark in his living room. This film was awarded Best Short Film in the Semaine de la Critique at the Cannes Film Festival in 1992.

In 1996 Heslop was commissioned by the rock group Queen to direct a film for the track "I Was Born to Love You" on the Made in Heaven compilation which was co-produced by the British Film Institute and Janine Marmot at Hot Property Films.

In 1997 Heslop directed commercials for Oil Factory Films which included the rebranding campaign of Fox's Biscuits for St Lukes in 1997. He also did promos for HSBC, Kodak and X-AM jeans.

Starting in 2000, Heslop directed shows for the BBC and Channel 4, including the TV series The Residents an 8 x 30min black comedy and began shooting a 35mm feature film State of the Party, a contemporary drama set in and about the dance culture scene, adapted from the book Disco Biscuits by Sarah Champion and Irvine Welsh. This project did not complete.

In 2010, after making a music video for Dan Le Sac vs Scroobius Pip called "Get Better" Heslop set up I Like Films, Me Ltd with producers Ciska Faulkner and Philip Shotton to produce the feature film Frank which he both wrote and directed. The film was shot in the north of England and was completed in March 2012. It premiered at the Cambridge Film Festival and was nominated for BIFA's Raindance Award in 2012.

In March 2014 Heslop showed his live multiple projections for 23 Skidoo as part of the BFI's This Is Now: Film and Video After Punk. It covered underground film from 1979 to 1985. It ended with 23 Skidoo playing live at the BFI Southbank as a tribute to Heslop's '7 Songs' experimental music Video.

In December 2014 Heslop directed Pour It On, an 8-minute short film piece, serving also as a music video for New Build. The film featured a performance of Second Skin by London performance artist Rachel Gomme. The film premiered in the New York Times Style magazine in a review of the album "Pour It On" by Ilana Kaplan.

Richard Heslop's experimental 'The Raft of the Medusa' was completed for BBC Radio 4 and aired 12 April 2015. Medusa is a tribute to the late Derek Jarman.

== See also ==
- Scratch Video
